= List of years in Australian literature =

This page gives a chronological list of years in Australian literature (descending order), with notable publications and events listed with their respective years. The time covered in individual years covers the period of European settlement of the country.

See Table of years in literature for an overview of all "year in literature" pages.

== 18th century ==
=== 1770s ===
- 1770 in literature:
- 1771 in literature:
- 1772 in literature:
- 1773 in literature:
- 1774 in literature:
- 1775 in literature:
- 1776 in literature:
- 1777 in literature:
- 1778 in literature:
- 1779 in literature:

=== 1780s ===
- 1780 in literature:
- 1781 in literature:
- 1782 in literature:
- 1783 in literature:
- 1784 in literature:
- 1785 in literature:
- 1786 in literature:
- 1787 in literature:
- 1788 in literature: Journal of a First Fleet Surgeon – George Bouchier Worgan
- 1789 in literature: "Visit of Hope to Sydney Cove Near Botany Bay" – Erasmus Darwin; The Voyage of Governor Phillip to Botany Bay – Arthur Phillip; A Narrative of the Expedition to Botany-Bay – Watkin Tench

=== 1790s ===
- 1790 in literature: Journal of a Voyage to New South Wales – John White
- 1791 in literature:
- 1792 in literature:
- 1793 in literature: A Complete Account of the Settlement at Port Jackson, in New South Wales'' – Watkin Tench
- 1794 in literature: Letters from an Exile at Botany Bay – Thomas Watling
- 1795 in literature:
- 1796 in literature:
- 1797 in literature:
- 1798 in literature:
- 1799 in literature:

== 19th century ==
=== 1800s ===
- 1800 in literature: "Botany Bay Eclogues" – Robert Southey
- 1801 in literature: Adventures on a Journey to New Holland – Therese Huber
- 1802 in literature:
- 1803 in literature: The Sydney Gazette and New South Wales Advertiser, the first Australian newspaper begins publication
- 1804 in literature:
- 1805 in literature:
- 1806 in literature:
- 1807 in literature:
- 1808 in literature:
- 1809 in literature:

=== 1810s ===
- 1810 in literature: "Ode (for His Majesty's Birth Day)" – Michael Massey Robinson
- 1811 in literature:
- 1812 in literature:
- 1813 in literature:
- 1814 in literature: A Voyage to Terra Australis – Matthew Flinders
- 1815 in literature:
- 1816 in literature:
- 1817 in literature:
- 1818 in literature:
- 1819 in literature: First Fruits of Australian Poetry – Barron Field; Memoirs of James Hardy Vaux – James Hardy Vaux

=== 1820s ===
- 1820 in literature: Journals of Two Expeditions into the Interior of New South Wales: Undertaken by Order of the British Government in the Years 1817–18 – John Oxley
- 1821 in literature: The Australian Magazine, the first Australian literary periodical begins publication
- 1822 in literature: The Life and Times of John Nicol, Mariner – John Nicol
- 1823 in literature: Australasia – William Wentworth; "D'Entrecasteaux' Channel, Van Dieman's Land" – John Dunmore Lang
- 1824 in literature:
- 1825 in literature:
- 1826 in literature: Aurora Australis – John Dunmore Lang
- 1827 in literature: The Van Diemen's Land warriors, or, The heroes of Cornwall – Pindar Juvenal
- 1828 in literature:
- 1829 in literature: The Bushrangers – David Burn; The Hermit in Van Diemen's Land – Henry Savery

=== 1830s ===
- 1830 in literature: Quintus Servinton – Henry Savery
- 1831 in literature:
- 1832 in literature: "A Convict's Tour of Hell" – Francis McNamara
- 1833 in literature:
- 1834 in literature:
- 1835 in literature:
- 1836 in literature:
- 1837 in literature: "Woman" – Charles Harpur
- 1838 in literature: The Guardian: a Tale (by an Australian) – Anna Maria Bunn; "The Aboriginal Mother" – Eliza Hamilton Dunlop; A Month in the Bush of Australia – Thomas Walker
- 1839 in literature:

=== 1840s ===
- 1840 in literature: Raymond – John Lang
- 1841 in literature: "My Native Land" – Henry Parkes
- 1842 in literature: "A War Song for the Nineteenth Century" – Charles Harpur; Stolen Moments – Henry Parkes; Tales of the Colonies – Charles Rowcroft
- 1843 in literature: "The Aboriginal Father" – Eliza Hamilton Dunlop; "The Dream by the Fountain" – Charles Harpur; "To Charles Harpur" – Henry Parkes
- 1844 in literature: "To Mary" – Charles Harpur
- 1845 in literature: "The Creek of the Four Graves" by Charles Harpur; "A Flight of Wild Ducks" by Charles Harpur; "Songs of the Squatters (No. 2)" – Robert Lowe
- 1846 in literature: The Bushranger of Van Diemen's Land – Charles Rowcroft
- 1847 in literature: "The Genius and the Ghost" – William Forster; Australian Sketches – Thomas McCombie
- 1848 in literature: Lucy Marline, or, The Bush-rangers: A Tale of New South Wales – Louis A. Baker
- 1849 in literature: "Our Coming Countrymen" – Henry Parkes

=== 1850s ===
- 1850 in Australian literature: "Rhymes to a Lady with a Copy of Love Poems" – Charles Harpur
- 1851 in Australian literature: "A Mid-Summer Noon in the Australian Forest" – Charles Harpur; Moyarra - G. W. Rusden
- 1852 in Australian literature: Life and Adventures of William Buckley – John Morgan
- 1853 in Australian literature: The Bushrangers, a Play in Five Acts, and Other Poems – Charles Harpur
- 1854 in Australian literature: "A Basket of Summer Fruit" – Charles Harpur; Lyra Australis, or, Attempts to Sing in a Strange Land – Caroline Leakey
- 1855 in Australian literature: The Eureka Stockade – Raffaello Carboni
- 1856 in Australian literature: "A Storm in the Mountains" – Charles Harpur; It Is Never Too Late to Mend — Charles Reade
- 1857 in Australian literature: Gertrude, the Emigrant: A Tale of Colonial Life – Louisa Atkinson; The Two Convicts – Friedrich Gerstaecker; "A Coast View" — Charles Harpur
- 1858 in Australian literature: The Kangaroo Hunters, or, Adventures in the Bush – Anne Bowman; "Aboriginal Death Song" – Charles Harpur; Peter 'Possum's Portfolio – Richard Rowe
- 1859 in Australian literature: The Recollections of Geoffry Hamlyn – Henry Kingsley; Botany Bay, or, True Stories of the Early Days of Australia – John Lang

=== 1860s ===
- 1860 in Australian literature: South Australian Lyrics – C. J. Carleton; Tasmanian Rhymings – John Anthony Moore; Margaret Falconer – Eliza Winstanley
- 1861 in Australian literature: "The Song of the Cattle Hunters" – Henry Kendall
- 1862 in Australian literature: Poems and Songs – Henry Kendall
- 1863 in Australian literature: "An Australian Girl's Farewell" – Emma Frances Anderson
- 1864 in Australian literature: The Australasian newspaper publishes its first issue; Raven Rockstrow or, The Pedlar's Dream: A Romance of Melbourne – Henry Newton Goodrich; "The Last of His Tribe" – Henry Kendall; Mr Hogarth's Will – Catherine Helen Spence
- 1865 in Australian literature: Force and Fraud : A Tale of the Bush – Ellen Davitt; "Cooee" – Mary Fortune; "Daniel Henry Deniehy" – Henry Kendall
- 1866 in Australian literature: Hymns on the Holy Communion – Ada Cambridge
- 1867 in Australian literature: Sea Spray and Smoke Drift – Adam Lindsay Gordon; "Bell-Birds" – Henry Kendall
- 1868 in Australian literature: Death of Charles Harpur; "A Death in the Bush" – Henry Kendall
- 1869 in Australian literature: Leaves from Australian Forests – Henry Kendall

=== 1870s ===
- 1870 in Australian literature: Death of Adam Lindsay Gordon; For the Term of His Natural Life – Marcus Clarke until 1872; Bush Ballads and Galloping Rhymes – Adam Lindsay Gordon; "The Sick Stockrider" – Adam Lindsay Gordon
- 1871 in Australian literature: The Bushranger's Autobiography – Mary Fortune; Convict Once – J. Brunton Stephens
- 1872 in Australian literature: "Sydney Harbour" – Henry Kendall
- 1873 in Australian literature: "The Aurora Australis" – Mary Hannay Foott; By and By: an historical romance of the future – Edward Maitland; The Black Gin and Other Poems – J. Brunton Stephens; Lady Anna – Anthony Trollope
- 1874 in Australian literature: "Song of the Shingle Splitters" – Henry Kendall
- 1875 in Australian literature: The Manor House and Other Poems – Ada Cambridge; "Mooni" – Henry Kendall
- 1876 in Australian literature: "Bill the Bullock Driver" – Henry Kendall
- 1877 in Australian literature: Babes in the Bush – Rolf Boldrewood; "The Dominion" – J. Brunton Stephens
- 1878 in Australian literature: "Advance Australia Fair" – Peter Dodds McCormick; "The Dukite Snake" – John Boyle O'Reilly
- 1879 in Australian literature: Death of Ellen Davitt; "To My Sister" – Adam Lindsay Gordon; The Jerilderie Letter – Ned Kelly

=== 1880s ===
- 1880 in Australian literature: The Bulletin magazine publishes its first issue; Songs from the Mountains – Henry Kendall
- 1881 in Australian literature: Death of Marcus Clarke; "Where the Pelican Builds" – Mary Hannay Foott; The Austral Months – Henry Kendall
- 1882 in Australian literature: Death of Henry Kendall; Robbery Under Arms – Rolf Boldrewood
- 1883 in Australian literature: Poems – Charles Harpur
- 1884 in Australian literature: Plain Living – Rolf Boldrewood; "Drought and Doctrine" – J. Brunton Stephens
- 1885 in Australian literature: Where the Pelican Builds and Other Poems – Mary Hannay Foott
- 1886 in Australian literature: The Mystery of the Hansom Cab – Fergus Hume; "The Buried Chief" – Henry Parkes; "Bannerman of Dandenong" – Alice Werner
- 1887 in Australian literature: How He Died and Other Poems – John Farrell;The Bond of Wedlock – Rosa Praed; The Sphinx of Eaglehawk: A Tale of Old Bendigo – Rolf Boldrewood
- 1888 in Australian literature: The History of Australian Exploration from 1788 to 1888 – Ernest Favenc; "Andy's Gone with Cattle" – Henry Lawson; "Faces in the Street" – Henry Lawson; A Century of Australian Song – Douglas Sladen (edited)
- 1889 in Australian literature: "The Teams" – Henry Lawson; "Clancy of the Overflow" – Banjo Paterson

=== 1890s ===
- 1890 in Australian literature: "The Song of Old Joe Swallow" – Henry Lawson; "The Man from Snowy River" – Banjo Paterson
- 1891 in Australian literature: "Where the Dead Men Lie" – Barcroft Boake; Coo-ee: Tales of Australian Life by Australian Ladies – Harriet Anne Patchett Martin
- 1892 in Australian literature: Death of Barcroft Boake; The Bulletin Debate, (to 1893); "The Old Bush Road" – Jennings Carmichael; "The Drover's Wife" – Henry Lawson; "The Man from Ironbark" – Banjo Paterson
- 1893 in Australian literature: "The Geebung Polo Club" – Banjo Paterson
- 1894 in Australian literature: In Strange Company – Guy Boothby; Seven Little Australians – Ethel Turner
- 1895 in Australian literature: A Bid for Fortune; Or, Doctor Nikola's Vendetta – Guy Boothby; The Man from Snowy River and Other Verses – Banjo Paterson; "Waltzing Matilda" – Banjo Paterson
- 1896 in Australian literature: Death of Henry Parkes; "The Chosen Vessel" – Barbara Baynton; Doctor Nikola – Guy Boothby; Rhymes from the Mines and Other Lines – Edward Dyson; In the Days When the World was Wide and Other Verses – Henry Lawson; While the Billy Boils – Henry Lawson; "Mulga Bill's Bicycle" – Banjo Paterson
- 1897 in Australian literature: Kirkham's Find – Mary Gaunt; "The Great Australian Adjective" – W. T. Goodge
- 1898 in Australian literature: At Dawn and Dusk – Victor Daley; Girls Together – Louise Mack; Fair Girls and Gray Horses: With Other Verses – Will H. Ogilvie; "How M'Dougal Topped the Score" — Thos. E. Spencer
- 1899 in Australian literature: Hits! Skits! and Jingles! – W. T. Goodge; On Our Selection – Steele Rudd

== 20th century ==
=== 1900s ===
- 1900 in Australian literature: Death of Charles De Boos; "Ode for Commonwealth Day" – George Essex Evans; Verses, Popular and Humorous – Henry Lawson; "Australia" – Bernard O'Dowd; An Outback Marriage – A. B. Paterson
- 1901 in Australian literature: My Brilliant Career – Miles Franklin; Joe Wilson and His Mates – Henry Lawson
- 1902 in Australian literature: Death of Breaker Morant; Tommy Cornstalk – J. H. M. Abbott; Bush Studies – Barbara Baynton; An Australian Girl in London – Louise Mack
- 1903 in Australian literature: Thirty Years in Australia – Ada Cambridge; Such Is Life – Joseph Furphy
- 1904 in Australian literature: Sisters: A Novel – Ada Cambridge; "The Last Review" – Henry Lawson
- 1905 in Australian literature: Death of Victor Daley; Rigby's Romance – Joseph Furphy; When I Was King and Other Verses – Henry Lawson
- 1906 in Australian literature: Betty the Scribe – Lilian Turner; "Taking the Old Piano" – Louisa Lawson; The Secret Key and Other Verses – George Essex Evans; An Anthology of Australian Verse – Bertram Stevens
- 1907 in Australian literature: Human Toll – Barbara Baynton; "In the Street" – John Shaw Neilson
- 1908 in Australian literature: "The Austra-laise" – C. J. Dennis; "My Country" – Dorothea Mackellar
- 1909 in Australian literature: Death of George Essex Evans, W. T. Goodge; "Heart of Spring!" – John Shaw Neilson; Some Everyday Folk and Dawn – Miles Franklin

=== 1910s ===
- 1910 in Australian literature: Death of Mary Fortune; The Getting of Wisdom – Henry Handel Richardson
- 1911 in Australian literature: Wine and Roses – Victor Daley; Jonah – Louis Stone
- 1912 in Australian literature: Death of Joseph Furphy; The Poems of Adam Lindsay Gordon – Adam Lindsay Gordon
- 1913 in Australian literature: Poems: 1913 – Christopher Brennan; "The Robe of Grass" – John Le Gay Brereton; Backblock Ballads and Other Verses – C. J. Dennis; A Curate in Bohemia – Norman Lindsay
- 1914 in Australian literature: Green Days and Cherries: the early verses of Shaw Neilson – John Shaw Neilson
- 1915 in Australian literature: Death of Rolf Boldrewood; The Songs of a Sentimental Bloke – C. J. Dennis
- 1916 in Australian literature: The Moods of Ginger Mick – C. J. Dennis; Samaritan Mary – Sumner Locke
- 1917 in Australian literature: Death of Sumner Locke; Songs of Love and Life – Zora Cross; Songs of a Campaign – Leon Gellert; "Old Botany Bay" – Mary Gilmore; Australia Felix – Henry Handel Richardson
- 1918 in Australian literature: Sally: The Tale of a Currency Lass – J. H. M. Abbott; Tales of Snugglepot and Cuddlepie: Their Wonderful Adventures – May Gibbs; The Magic Pudding – Norman Lindsay; The Oxford Book of Australasian Verse — Walter Murdoch
- 1919 in Australian literature: Death of J. F. Archibald; The Burning Marl – John Le Gay Brereton; Out of the Silence – Erle Cox; The Escapades of Ann – Edward Dyson; Heart of Spring – John Shaw Neilson; The Shrieking Pit – Arthur J Rees

=== 1920s ===
- 1920 in Australian literature: Death of Louisa Lawson; "The Farmer Remembers the Somme" – Vance Palmer
- 1921 in Australian literature: A Book for Kids – C. J. Dennis; "Said Hanrahan" – John O'Brien
- 1922 in Australian literature: Death of Henry Lawson; "Schoolgirls Hastening" – John Shaw Neilson; "Nuremberg" – Kenneth Slessor
- 1923 in Australian literature: Kangaroo – D. H. Lawrence
- 1924 in Australian literature: The Boy in the Bush – D. H. Lawrence and M. L. Skinner
- 1925 in Australian literature: The Way Home – Henry Handel Richardson
- 1926 in Australian literature: The Butcher Shop – Jean Devanny; "The Gentle Water Bird" – John Shaw Neilson
- 1927 in Australian literature: "Happiness" – Katharine Susannah Prichard; "Country Towns" – Kenneth Slessor
- 1928 in Australian literature: ALS Gold Medal is awarded for the first time; The Montfords – Martin Boyd; Up the Country – Miles Franklin; Coonardoo – Katharine Susannah Prichard; "Choker's Lane" – Kenneth Slessor
- 1929 in Australian literature: Death of Barbara Baynton; A Man's Life – Arthur H. Adams; Ultima Thule – Henry Handel Richardson

=== 1930s ===
- 1930 in Australian literature: Here's Luck – Lennie Lower; The Passage – Vance Palmer
- 1931 in Australian literature: Death of Edward Dyson; Man-Shy – Frank Dalby Davison; Back to Bool Bool – Miles Franklin; "Five Visions of Captain Cook" – Kenneth Slessor
- 1932 in Australian literature: Death of Christopher Brennan, Fergus Hume; Flesh in Armour – Leonard Mann
- 1933 in Australian literature: Death of John Le Gay Brereton; Bring the Monkey – Miles Franklin; Pageant – G. B. Lancaster; Blinky Bill – Dorothy Wall
- 1934 in Australian literature: Prelude to Christopher – Eleanor Dark; Mary Poppins – P. L. Travers
- 1935 in Australian literature: Death of Mabel Forrest, Louise Mack, Frederick Manning; Earth's Quality – Winifred Birkett; The Lemon Farm – Martin Boyd; The Singing Garden – C. J. Dennis
- 1936 in Australian literature: Death of Arthur Henry Adams; Return to Coolami – Eleanor Dark; All That Swagger – Miles Franklin
- 1937 in Australian literature: The Picnic – Martin Boyd; The Young Desire It – Seaforth Mackenzie; Under Capricorn – Helen Simpson
- 1938 in Australian literature: Death of C. J. Dennis; Moonlight Acre – R. D. FitzGerald; Capricornia – Xavier Herbert; House of All Nations – Christina Stead
- 1939 in Australian literature: Southerly magazine publishes its first issue; Battlefields – Mary Gilmore; "Five Bells" – Kenneth Slessor; Happy Valley – Patrick White

=== 1940s ===
- 1940 in Australian literature: Meanjin magazine publishes its first issue; "No Foe Shall Gather Our Harvest" – Mary Gilmore; The Man Who Loved Children – Christina Stead
- 1941 in Australian literature: Death of Banjo Paterson; The Battlers – Kylie Tennant
- 1942 in Australian literature: Death of John Shaw Neilson; "Nationality" – Mary Gilmore; The Pea-Pickers – Eve Langley
- 1943 in Australian literature: Death of Louis Esson; Ride on Stranger – Kylie Tennant
- 1944 in Australian literature: Death of Capel Boake; Ern Malley poems first published; "Beach Burial" – Kenneth Slessor; For Love Alone – Christina Stead; "Bullocky" – Judith Wright
- 1945 in Australian literature: The Cousin from Fiji – Norman Lindsay; "The Tomb of Lt. John Learmonth, AIF" – J. S. Manifold; "South of My Days" – Judith Wright
- 1946 in Australian literature: Death of Henry Handel Richardson; Lucinda Brayford – Martin Boyd; My Career Goes Bung – Miles Franklin; "Woman to Child" – Judith Wright
- 1947 in Australian literature: Death of Lennie Lower; Grace Leven Prize for Poetry is awarded for the first time; Tomorrow and Tomorrow – M. Barnard Eldershaw
- 1948 in Australian literature: The Harp in the South – Ruth Park; Golden Miles – Katharine Susannah Prichard; The Aunt's Story – Patrick White
- 1949 in Australian literature: Death of Roderic Quinn; Poor Man's Orange – Ruth Park; Woman to Man – Judith Wright

=== 1950s ===
- 1950 in Australian literature: Farewell to Cricket – Don Bradman; Power Without Glory – Frank Hardy; A Town Like Alice – Nevil Shute
- 1951 in Australian literature: Death of Daisy Bates; Come In Spinner – Dymphna Cusack & Florence James; The Great South Land: An Epic Poem – Rex Ingamells
- 1952 in Australian literature: The Cardboard Crown – Martin Boyd; The Sundowners – Jon Cleary
- 1953 in Australian literature: The Big Chariot – Charmian Clift and George Johnston; Southern Steel – Dymphna Cusack
- 1954 in Australian literature: Death of Miles Franklin; White Topee – Eve Langley; "At Cooloolah" – Judith Wright
- 1955 in Australian literature: Death of Rex Ingamells; The Wandering Islands – A. D. Hope; Summer of the Seventeenth Doll – Ray Lawler; I Can Jump Puddles – Alan Marshall; The Shiralee – D'Arcy Niland; The Tree of Man – Patrick White
- 1956 in Australian literature: The Brown Land was Green – Mavis Thorpe Clark; Beyond the Black Stump – Nevil Shute
- 1957 in Australian literature: Tiger in the Bush – Nan Chauncy; On the Beach – Nevil Shute; Voss – Patrick White
- 1958 in Australian literature: First Miles Franklin Literary Award presented; Devil's Hill – Nan Chauncy; To the Islands – Randolph Stow; "Five Days Old" – Francis Webb
- 1959 in Australian literature: Death of Vance Palmer; Kings in Grass Castles – Mary Durack; The Big Fellow – Vance Palmer; The Devil's Advocate – Morris West

=== 1960s ===
- 1960 in Australian literature: Death of Nevil Shute; First Adelaide Writers' Week held; A Descant for Gossips – Thea Astley; The Irishman – Elizabeth O'Conner; The One Day of the Year – Alan Seymour
- 1961 in Australian literature: Death of Jeannie Gunn; Masters in Israel - Vincent Buckley; Wake in Fright – Kenneth Cook; Sun on the Stubble – Colin Thiele; Riders in the Chariot – Patrick White
- 1962 in Australian literature: Death of Mary Gilmore; The Well Dressed Explorer – Thea Astley; The History of Australia – Manning Clark (to 1987); Twenty-Three : Stories — John Morrison; The Cupboard Under the Stairs – George Turner
- 1963 in Australian literature: Death of Will H. Ogilvie; Careful, He Might Hear You – Sumner Locke Elliott; Storm Boy – Colin Thiele; The Shoes of the Fisherman – Morris West
- 1964 in Australian literature: Death of Zora Cross; The Lucky Country – Donald Horne; My Brother Jack – George Johnston; We Are Going – Oodgeroo Noonuccal
- 1965 in Australian literature: The Slow Natives – Thea Astley; The Merry-Go-Round in the Sea – Randolph Stow; The Ambassador – Morris West
- 1966 in Australian literature: Death of Eric Lambert; The Tyranny of Distance – Geoffrey Blainey; Trap – Peter Mathers; "No More Boomerang" – Oodgeroo Noonuccal; The Solid Mandala – Patrick White
- 1967 in Australian literature: Death of D'Arcy Niland, David Unaipon; Bring Larks and Heroes – Tom Keneally; Picnic at Hanging Rock – Joan Lindsay
- 1968 in Australian literature: Death of Dorothea Mackellar, Bernard Cronin; Three Cheers for the Paraclete – Tom Keneally; "Because" – James McAuley
- 1969 in Australian literature: Death of Charmian Clift, Norman Lindsay, Katharine Susannah Prichard; Clean Straw for Nothing – George Johnston

=== 1970s ===
- 1970 in Australian literature: Death of Nan Chauncy, George Johnston; The Female Eunuch – Germaine Greer; A Horse of Air – Dal Stivens; The Vivisector – Patrick White
- 1971 in Australian literature: Death of Kenneth Slessor; Josh – Ivan Southall wins the Carnegie Medal (UK); The Unknown Industrial Prisoner – David Ireland; A Cartload of Clay – George Johnston; Don's Party – David Williamson
- 1972 in Australian literature: Death of Martin Boyd; The Acolyte – Thea Astley; The Chant of Jimmie Blacksmith – Tom Keneally
- 1973 in Australian literature: Patrick White is awarded the Nobel Prize in Literature; The Nargun and the Stars – Patricia Wrightson
- 1974 in Australian literature: Death of Eve Langley; The Age Book of the Year Awards awarded for the first time; Peter's Pence – Jon Cleary; The Mango Tree – Ronald McKie; Neighbours in a Thicket: Poems – David Malouf
- 1975 in Australian literature: Poor Fellow My Country – Xavier Herbert; Gossip from the Forest – Thomas Keneally
- 1976 in Australian literature: Death of James McAuley; The Glass Canoe – David Ireland; "The Buladelah-Taree Holiday Song Cycle" – Les Murray;
- 1977 in Australian literature: Monkey Grip – Helen Garner; The Thorn Birds – Colleen McCullough; Swords and Crowns and Rings – Ruth Park; The Club – David Williamson
- 1978 in Australian literature: Tirra Lirra By the River – Jessica Anderson; Christopher Koch – The Year of Living Dangerously; An Imaginary Life – David Malouf
- 1979 in Australian literature: Death of David Campbell, Ion Idriess; A Woman of the Future – David Ireland; The Visitants – Randolph Stow

=== 1980s ===
- 1980 in Australian literature: The Impersonators – Jessica Anderson; The Dying Trade – Peter Corris; Tracks – Robyn Davidson; The Transit of Venus – Shirley Hazzard; Unreliable Memoirs – Clive James; The Boys Who Stole the Funeral – Les Murray
- 1981 in Australian literature: Death of Dymphna Cusack; Bliss – Peter Carey; A Fortunate Life – Albert Facey
- 1982 in Australian literature: Just Relations – Rodney Hall; Schindler's Ark – Tom Keneally wins the Man Booker Prize; The Plains – Gerald Murnane
- 1983 in Australian literature: Death of Christina Stead, Alan Moorehead; Possum Magic – Mem Fox
- 1984 in Australian literature: Death of Xavier Herbert; Archimedes and the Seagle — David Ireland; Milk and Honey – Elizabeth Jolley; Shallows – Tim Winton
- 1985 in Australian literature: Lilian's Story – Kate Grenville; The Doubleman – Christopher Koch
- 1986 in Australian literature: Death of Olga Masters; The Well – Elizabeth Jolley; The Fatal Shore – Robert Hughes
- 1987 in Australian literature: Dancing on Coral – Glenda Adams; The Songlines – Bruce Chatwin; Louisa – Brian Matthews; My Place – Sally Morgan; The Sea and Summer – George Turner; Emerald City – David Williamson
- 1988 in Australian literature: Death of Kylie Tennant; Oscar and Lucinda – Peter Carey wins the Man Booker Prize
- 1989 in Australian literature: The Power of One – Bryce Courtenay; Oceana Fine – Tom Flood; Maestro – Peter Goldsworthy; I for Isobel – Amy Witting

=== 1990s ===
- 1990 in Australian literature: Death of Patrick White; Cabin Fever – Elizabeth Jolley; The Great World – David Malouf
- 1991 in Australian literature: Death of Manning Clark; Our Sunshine – Robert Drewe; Patrick White : A Life – David Marr; Cloudstreet – Tim Winton
- 1992 in Australian literature: Praise – Andrew McGahan; Looking for Alibrandi – Melina Marchetta; The Ancestor Game – Alex Miller
- 1993 in Australian literature: Death of Nancy Keesing; The Grisly Wife – Rodney Hall; Grand Days – Frank Moorhouse; Christina Stead: A Biography – Hazel Rowley
- 1994 in Australian literature: Death of Frank Hardy; The Hand That Signed the Paper – Helen Demidenko; Permutation City – Greg Egan; The Monkey's Mask – Dorothy Porter
- 1995 in Australian literature: Death of Gwen Harwood; The First Stone – Helen Garner; Highways to a War – Christopher Koch
- 1996 in Australian literature: Death of P. L. Travers; The Drowner – Robert Drewe; The Glade within the Grove – David Foster; Remembering Babylon – David Malouf wins the International Dublin Literary Award; Subhuman Redneck Poems – Les Murray
- 1997 in Australian literature: Death of Dal Stivens, George Turner; The Endeavour Journal of Sir Joseph Banks, 1768–71 – Joseph Banks; Jack Maggs – Peter Carey
- 1998 in Australian literature: Death of Geoffrey Dutton, Elizabeth Riddell; Eucalyptus – Murray Bail; Romulus, My Father – Raymond Gaita; Mr. Darwin's Shooter – Roger McDonald; Fredy Neptune – Les Murray
- 1999 in Australian literature: Death of Morris West; Drylands – Thea Astley; The Idea of Perfection – Kate Grenville; Benang – Kim Scott

== 21st century ==
=== 2000s ===
- 2000 in Australian literature: Death of A. D. Hope, Judith Wright; The Day We Had Hitler Home – Rodney Hall; Dark Palace – Frank Moorhouse
- 2001 in Australian literature: Death of Amy Witting; Quarterly Essay publishes its first issue; True History of the Kelly Gang – Peter Carey wins the Man Booker Prize; Gould's Book of Fish – Richard Flanagan; Stravinsky's Lunch – Drusilla Modjeska; Dirt Music – Tim Winton
- 2002 in Australian literature: Death of Dorothy Hewett; Moral Hazard – Kate Jennings; Journey to the Stone Country – Alex Miller
- 2003 in Australian literature: Death of Joan Phipson; Mangroves – Laurie Duggan; The Great Fire – Shirley Hazzard wins the National Book Award (USA)
- 2004 in Australian literature: Death of Thea Astley; Totem – Luke Davies; Sixty Lights – Gail Jones; The White Earth – Andrew McGahan
- 2005 in Australian literature: Death of Donald Horne; Shanghai Dancing – Brian Castro; The Secret River – Kate Grenville; A Commonwealth of Thieves: The Improbable Birth of Australia – Tom Keneally; The Ballad of Desmond Kale – Roger McDonald
- 2006 in Australian literature: Death of Colin Thiele; The Garden Book – Brian Castro; The Arrival – Shaun Tan; Carpentaria – Alexis Wright
- 2007 in Australian literature: Death of Elizabeth Jolley; The Time We Have Taken – Steven Carroll; The Zookeeper's War – Steven Conte; The Lost Dog – Michelle de Kretser; The Broken Shore – Peter Temple wins the Crime Writers' Association Duncan Lawrie Dagger award (UK)
- 2008 in Australian literature: Death of Dorothy Porter, Ivan Southall, Eleanor Spence; The Spare Room – Helen Garner; The Slap – Christos Tsiolkas; Breath – Tim Winton; Sonya Hartnett receives the Astrid Lindgren Memorial Award
- 2009 in Australian literature: Parrot and Olivier in America – Peter Carey; Ransom – David Malouf; Truth – Peter Temple; The Bath Fugues – Brian Castro

=== 2010s ===
- 2010 in Australian literature: Death of Jessica Anderson, Ruth Park, Peter Porter, David Rowbotham, Patricia Wrightson; That Deadman Dance – Kim Scott; Bereft – Chris Womersley; Glenda Guest receives the Commonwealth Writers Prize best first book
- 2011 in Australian literature: Death of Sara Douglass, T. A. G. Hungerford, Hazel Rowley; All That I Am – Anna Funder; Sarah Thornhill – Kate Grenville; Foal's Bread – Gillian Mears
- 2012 in Australian literature: Death of Bryce Courtenay, Rosemary Dobson, Max Fatchen, Robert Hughes; The Chemistry of Tears – Peter Carey; Questions of Travel – Michelle de Kretser; The Rosie Project – Graeme Simsion; The Hanging Garden – Patrick White
- 2013 in Australian literature: Death of Keith Dunstan, Christopher Koch; The Childhood of Jesus – J. M. Coetzee; The Narrow Road to the Deep North – Richard Flanagan; Burial Rites – Hannah Kent; Eyrie – Tim Winton; All The Birds, Singing – Evie Wyld
- 2014 in Australian literature: Death of Liam Davison, Morris Lurie; Amnesia – Peter Carey; In Certain Circles – Elizabeth Harrower; The Eye of the Sheep – Sofie Laguna; The Golden Age – Joan London; Clariel – Garth Nix; The Narrow Road to the Deep North by Richard Flanagan wins the 2014 Man Booker Prize
- 2015 in Australian literature: Death of Veronica Brady, Colleen McCullough; Black Rock White City – A. S. Patrić; The Natural Way of Things – Charlotte Wood; Life or Death — Michael Robotham wins the Crime Writers' Association Gold Dagger award (UK)
- 2016 in Australian literature: Death of Leonie Kramer, Gillian Mears; The Museum of Modern Love — Heather Rose; Extinctions – Josephine Wilson; The Dry — Jane Harper wins the Crime Writers' Association Gold Dagger award (UK)
- 2017 in Australian literature: Death of Peter Luck; The Life to Come – Michelle de Kretser
- 2018 in Australian literature: Death of Peter Temple, Peter Corris; Boy Swallows Universe — Trent Dalton; Too Much Lip – Melissa Lucashenko
- 2019 in Australian literature: Death of Andrew McGahan, Les Murray, Clive James; The Yield – Tara June Winch

=== 2020s ===
- 2020 in Australian literature: Death of Bruce Dawe, Elizabeth Harrower; The Labyrinth – Amanda Lohrey; Song of the Crocodile – Nardi Simpson; Good Girl, Bad Girl — Michael Robotham wins the Crime Writers' Association Gold Dagger award (UK)
- 2021 in Australian literature: Death of Kate Jennings, Tim Thorne; Bodies of Light – Jennifer Down
- 2022 in Australian literature: Death of Jordie Albiston, Frank Moorhouse, David Ireland, Robert Adamson; Cold Enough for Snow – Jessica Au; Chai Time at Cinnamon Gardens – Shankari Chandran
- 2023 in Australian literature: Death of Andrew Burke, Gabrielle Carey, Ron Pretty, John Tranter; Edenglassie – Melissa Lucashenko; Stone Yard Devotional – Charlotte Wood; Praiseworthy – Alexis Wright
- 2024 in Australian literature: Death of Barbara Blackman, Marion Halligan, Jack Hibberd, Ray Lawler, John Marsden, Brenda Walker; Theory & Practice – Michelle de Kretser; Ghost Cities – Siang Lu; Highway 13 – Fiona McFarlane
- 2025 in Australian literature: Death of Kerry Greenwood, Robert Gray, Chris Wallace-Crabbe; The Immigrants – Moreno Giovannoni; Fierceland – Omar Musa; The Rot – Evelyn Araluen
- 2026 in Australian literature: Death of Lionel Fogarty, David Malouf, Hilary McPhee, Terry Denton
