= 1919 in Australian literature =

This article presents a list of the historical events and publications of Australian literature during 1919.

== Books ==
- Randolph Bedford — Aladdin and the Boss Cockie
- Erle Cox — Out of the Silence
- Edward Dyson — The Escapades of Ann
- Mary Gaunt — A Wind from the Wilderness
- Jack McLaren — The Skipper of the Roaring Meg
- Harrison Owen — The Mount Marunga Mystery
- Arthur J. Rees — The Shrieking Pit
- Steele Rudd — We Kaytons
- Ethel Turner — Brigid and the Cub

== Poetry ==
- E. J. Brady — House of the Winds
- John Le Gay Brereton — The Burning Marl
- C. J. Dennis — Jim of the Hills
- Edward Dyson — Hello, Soldier!: Khaki Verse
- Will Dyson — "Death is but Death"
- John Shaw Neilson — Heart of Spring
- John O'Brien — "Said Hanrahan"
- Vance Palmer — "The Dandenongs"
- A. B. Paterson — "Boots"

== Short stories ==
- Basil Garstang — "Robson"
- Dowell O'Reilly — "Twilight"

== Births ==
A list, ordered by date of birth (and, if the date is either unspecified or repeated, ordered alphabetically by surname) of births in 1919 of Australian literary figures, authors of written works or literature-related individuals follows, including year of death.

- 6 January — Geoffrey C. Bingham, theological and short story writer (died 2009)
- 9 May — Nene Gare, novelist (died 1994)
- 28 May — Olga Masters, novelist (died 1986)
- 18 June — Gina Ballantyne, poet (died 1973)
- 27 November — Hugh V. Clarke, soldier, public servant and military historian (died 1996)
- 17 December — Charlotte Jay, suspense novelist (died 1996)

== Deaths ==
A list, ordered by date of death (and, if the date is either unspecified or repeated, ordered alphabetically by surname) of deaths in 1919 of Australian literary figures, authors of written works or literature-related individuals follows, including year of birth.

- 17 January — E. S. Emerson, poet (born 1870)
- 3 March — Oliver Hogue, soldier, journalist and poet who wrote as Trooper Bluegum (died in London) (born 1880)
- 12 March — Ruby Lindsay, artist and writer (born 1885)
- 25 July — Nat Gould, journalist and novelist (born 1857)
- 10 September — J. F. Archibald, editor (born 1856)

== See also ==
- 1919 in Australia
- 1919 in literature
- 1919 in poetry
- List of years in Australian literature
- List of years in literature
