= 1905 in Australian literature =

This article presents a list of the historical events and publications of Australian literature during 1905.

== Books ==
- Rolf Boldrewood – The Last Chance: A Tale of the Golden West
- Guy Boothby — A Brighton Tragedy
- Tom Collins – Rigby's Romance
- G. B. Lancaster – The Spur to Smite
- Rosa Praed — The Maid of the River

== Children's and young adult ==
- Mary Grant Bruce – A Little Bush Maid
- Jeannie Gunn — The Little Black Princess
- Violet Teague and Geraldine Rede — Night Fall in the Ti-Tree
- Ethel Turner – A White Roof-Tree

== Short stories ==
- Guy Boothby – A Crime of the Under Seas, and Other Stories
- Joseph Furphy – "The Jeweller's Shop"

== Poetry ==
- Arthur A. D. Bayldon – The Western Track and Other Verses
- Victor J. Daley
  - "The Call of the City"
  - "St. Francis II"
- Henry Lawson – When I Was King and Other Verses
- Louisa Lawson – The Lonely Crossing and Other Poems
- Dorothy Frances McCrae – "The Treasure"
- Hugh McCrae – "Australian Spring"
- A.B. Paterson
  - "Lay of the Motor Car"
  - Old Bush Songs: Composed and Sung in the Bushranging, Digging and Overlanding Days (ed.)
  - "Saltbush Bill, J.P."
- Ethel Turner – "A Boat on the Sea"

== Biography ==
- Mrs Aeneas Gunn – The Little Black Princess: A True Tale of Life in the Never-Never Land

== Births ==
A list, ordered by date of birth (and, if the date is either unspecified or repeated, ordered alphabetically by surname) of births in 1905 of Australian literary figures, authors of written works or literature-related individuals follows, including year of death.

- 1 April – Paul Hasluck, poet and journalist (died 1993)
- 10 April – Norma L. Davis, poet (died 1945)
- 3 June —Mena Calthorpe, writer (died 1996)
- 7 July – Martin Haley, poet and translator (died 1980)
- 28 August – Len Fox, journalist, historian, social activist and painter (died 2004)
- 17 November – Brian Fitzpatrick, author, historian and journalist (died 1965)
- 28 December – Leslie Rees, journalist and writer for children (died 2000)

== Deaths ==
A list, ordered by date of death (and, if the date is either unspecified or repeated, ordered alphabetically by surname) of deaths in 1905 of Australian literary figures, authors of written works or literature-related individuals follows, including year of birth.

- 26 February – Guy Boothby, novelist (born 1867)
- 29 December – Victor J. Daley, poet (born 1858 in Northern Ireland)

== See also ==
- 1905 in Australia
- 1905 in literature
- 1905 in poetry
- List of years in Australian literature
- List of years in literature
