= 1853 in Australian literature =

This article presents a list of the historical events and publications of Australian literature during 1853.

== Events ==
- The Illustrated Sydney News newspaper published its first edition on 8 October 1853. It ceased publication in February 1894.

== Books ==
- John Lang
  - The Forger's Wife, or, Emily Orford
  - The Wetherbys, Father and Son, or, Sundry Chapters of Indian Experience

== Short stories ==
- John Lang – "The Ghost upon the Rail"

== Poetry ==
- Charles Harpur – The Bushrangers, a Play in Five Acts, and Other Poems

== Drama ==
- Francis Belfield – The Mysteries of Sydney

== Births ==
- 28 September – Bertha McNamara (in Poland), writer and political activist (died 1931)

== See also ==
- 1853 in poetry
- 1853 in literature
- List of years in literature
- List of years in Australian literature
