= 1926 in Australian literature =

This article presents a list of the historical events and publications of Australian literature during 1926.

== Books ==
- Mary Grant Bruce – The Tower Rooms
- Carlton Dawe – The Forbidden Shrine
- Jean Devanny
  - The Butcher Shop
  - Lenore Divine
- Mabel Forrest – Gaming Gods
- Mary Gaunt – The Forbidden Town
- Jack McLaren
  - The Hidden Lagoon
  - Isle of Escape : A Story of the South Seas
- Katharine Susannah Prichard
  - The Wild Oats of Han
  - Working Bullocks
- E. V. Timms – The Valley of Adventure

== Short stories ==
- Xavier Herbert – "The Maniac and the Full Moon"
- Vance Palmer – "The Birthday"
- Katharine Susannah Prichard – "The Curse"
- Steele Rudd – The Rudd Family

== Children's and Young Adult fiction ==
- Mary Grant Bruce – Robin
- W. M. Fleming – Bunyip Told Me
- Ethel Turner – Funny
- Lilian Turner – The Happy Heriots

== Poetry ==
- Jack Lindsay – The Passionate Neatherd : a lyric sequence
- Dorothea Mackellar – Fancy Dress and Other Verse
- Furnley Maurice – "Beauty of the World"
- Myra Morris – "The Pallid Cuckoo"
- John Shaw Neilson
  - "The Birds Go By"
  - "The Flight of the Weary"
  - "The Gentle Water Bird"
- Kenneth Slessor – Earth-Visitors : Poems

== Births ==
A list, ordered by date of birth (and, if the date is either unspecified or repeated, ordered alphabetically by surname) of births in 1926 of Australian literary figures, authors of written works or literature-related individuals follows, including year of death.

- 7 January – Graham Stone, bibliographer (died 2013)
- 23 February – Ann Moyal, historian of science (died 2019)
- 30 July – Patricia Clarke, historian, journalist and writer (died 2026)
- 31 July – Ian Moffitt, novelist (died 2000)
- 26 August – Portia Robinson, historian (died 2023)

== Deaths ==
A list, ordered by date of death (and, if the date is either unspecified or repeated, ordered alphabetically by surname) of deaths in 1926 of Australian literary figures, authors of written works or literature-related individuals follows, including year of birth.

- 6 June – Henry Tate, poet (born 1873)
- 19 July – Ada Cambridge, novelist and poet (born 1844)

== See also ==
- 1926 in Australia
- 1926 in literature
- 1926 in poetry
- List of years in Australian literature
- List of years in literature
