= 1854 in Australian literature =

This article presents a list of the historical events and publications of Australian literature during 1854.

== Events ==
- The Age newspaper published its first issue in Melbourne on 17 October 1854.

== Books ==
- Catherine Helen Spence – Clara Morison: A Tale of South Australia During the Gold Fever
- Samuel Sidney – Gallops and Gossips in the Bush of Australia

== Short stories ==
- Ellen Clacy – Lights and Shadows of Australian Life

== Children's ==
- William Howitt – A Boy's Adventure in the Wilds of Australia, or, Herbert's Note-Book

== Poetry ==
- George French Angas – "To the River Murray"
- Charles Harpur – "A Basket of Summer Fruit"
- Caroline Leakey – Lyra Australis, or, Attempts to Sing in a Strange Land

== Non-fiction ==
- John Capper – Australia : As a Field for Capital, Skill, and Labour : With Useful Information for Emigrants of all Classes

== Births ==
A list, ordered by date of birth (and, if the date is either unspecified or repeated, ordered alphabetically by surname) of births in 1854 of Australian literary figures, authors of written works or literature-related individuals follows, including year of death.

26 February – Mungo William MacCallum, literary critic (died 1942)

Unknown date

- Edmund Fisher, editor, theatre critic and poet (died 1924)

== Deaths ==
21 July – Fidelia Hill, poet (born 1794 in England)

== See also ==
- 1854 in poetry
- 1854 in literature
- List of years in literature
- List of years in Australian literature
