= 1859 in Australian literature =

This article presents a list of the historical events and publications of Australian literature during 1859.

== Books ==
- Maud Jeanne Franc – Marian, or The Light of Someone's Home : A Tale of Australian Bush Life
- Oliné Keese – The Broad Arrow
- Henry Kingsley – The Recollections of Geoffry Hamlyn

== Short stories ==
- John Lang
  - Botany Bay, or, True Stories of the Early Days of Australia
  - "The Master and His Man"

== Poetry ==
- Henry Kendall – "The Far Future"
- W. H. H. Yarrington – "Cook, Meditating on Australia's Future"

== Births ==
A list, ordered by date of birth (and, if the date is either unspecified or repeated, ordered alphabetically by surname) of births in 1859 of Australian literary figures, authors of written works or literature-related individuals follows, including year of death.

- 19 June – Ethel Pedley, author of Dot and the Kangaroo (born in England) (died 1898)
- 8 July – Fergus Hume, novelist (died 1932)
- 16 October – Daisy Bates, poet (died 1951)

== See also ==
- 1859 in poetry
- 1859 in literature
- List of years in literature
- List of years in Australian literature
