= 1865 in Australian literature =

This article presents a list of the historical events and publications of Australian literature during 1865.

== Books ==
- Ada Cambridge – The Two Surplices
- Ellen Davitt – Force and Fraud : A Tale of the Bush
- Benjamin Farjeon – Shadows on the Snow : A Christmas Story
- Maud Jeanne Franc – Emily's Choice : An Australian Tale

== Short stories ==
- J. R. Houlding – "Mr McFaddle's Pic-nic Party"

== Poetry ==
- Mary Fortune – "Cooee"
- Henry Kendall
  - "Daniel Henry Deniehy"
  - "The Glen of the White Man's Grave" (a.k.a. "The Glen of Arrawatta")

== Births ==
A list, ordered by date of birth (and, if the date is either unspecified or repeated, ordered alphabetically by surname) of births in 1865 of Australian literary figures, authors of written works or literature-related individuals follows, including year of death.

- 9 January – Peter Airey, politician, poet and writer (died 1950)
- 11 February – Ida Lee, historian and poet (died 1943)
- 4 March – Edward Dyson, poet and writer (died 1931)
- 20 March – Arthur Bayldon, poet (died 1958)
- 2 May – William Gay, poet (died 1897)
- 8 August – Marion Knowles, novelist, poet and journalist (died 1949)
- 16 August – Mary Gilmore, poet (died 1962)
- 28 August – Alfred Stephens, writer and critic (died 1933)
- 21 September – Francis Kenna, politician, poet and writer (died 1932)
- 25 September – Agnes Littlejohn, poet and short story writer (died 1944)

== Deaths ==
A list, ordered by date of death (and, if the date is either unspecified or repeated, ordered alphabetically by surname) of deaths in 1865 of Australian literary figures, authors of written works or literature-related individuals follows, including year of birth.

- 22 October – Daniel Henry Deniehy, politician and writer (born 1828)

== See also ==
- 1865 in Australia
- 1865 in literature
- 1865 in poetry
- List of years in Australian literature
- List of years in literature
