= 1858 in Australian literature =

This article presents a list of the historical events and publications of Australian literature during 1858.

== Books ==
- Anne Bowman – The Kangaroo Hunters, or, Adventures in the Bush
- John Lang – Will He Marry Her? A Novel
- Richard Rowe – Peter 'Possum's Portfolio

== Poetry ==
- Charles Harpur – "Aboriginal Death Song"

== Births ==
A list, ordered by date of birth (and, if the date is either unspecified or repeated, ordered alphabetically by surname) of births in 1858 of Australian literary figures, authors of written works or literature-related individuals follows, including year of death.

- 5 September – Victor J. Daley, poet (born in Northern Ireland) (died 1905)
- 29 November – Thomas Welsby, businessman, politician and historian (died 1941)

== See also ==
- 1858 in poetry
- 1858 in literature
- List of years in literature
- List of years in Australian literature
