= Jessie Street National Women's Library =

Library in Sydney, New South Wales, Australia

Coordinates: 33.8778°S 151.1984°E

- Location: Ultimo Community Centre, 523-525 Harris Street, Ultimo NSW 2007, Australia
- Type: Library
- Established: 1989

Collection
- Items collected: books, journals, oral histories, sound and music recordings, archives, photographs, pamphlets and posters
- Size: 10,000 books 132 archive collections

Access and use
- Access requirements: Open to the public for research and the lending collection is available to financial members.

Other information
- Website: Jessie Street National Women's Library

The Jessie Street National Women's Library is a specialist library that collects, preserves, and promotes the awareness of the literary and cultural heritage of Australian women.

== History ==
In response to the difficulty of locating material about the experiences and issues relating to women in Australia, Shirley Jones and Lenore Coltheart developed the concept of a women's library. The objectives of the Library are "to heighten awareness of women's issues; to preserve documents on women's lives and activities; to support the field of women's history and to highlight women's contribution to this country's development." A committee was established and the Jessie Street Women's Library Association held an inaugural Annual General Meeting in August 1989.

In March 1990, the organisation was incorporated and granted status as a registered charity.

The Library's patrons include Jessie Street's son Sir Laurence Street, the Hon Elizabeth Evatt AC, and poets, Judith Wright and Oodgeroo Noonuccal.

The Library is currently staffed by volunteers and located in the Ultimo Community Centre, a venue provided by the City of Sydney Council.

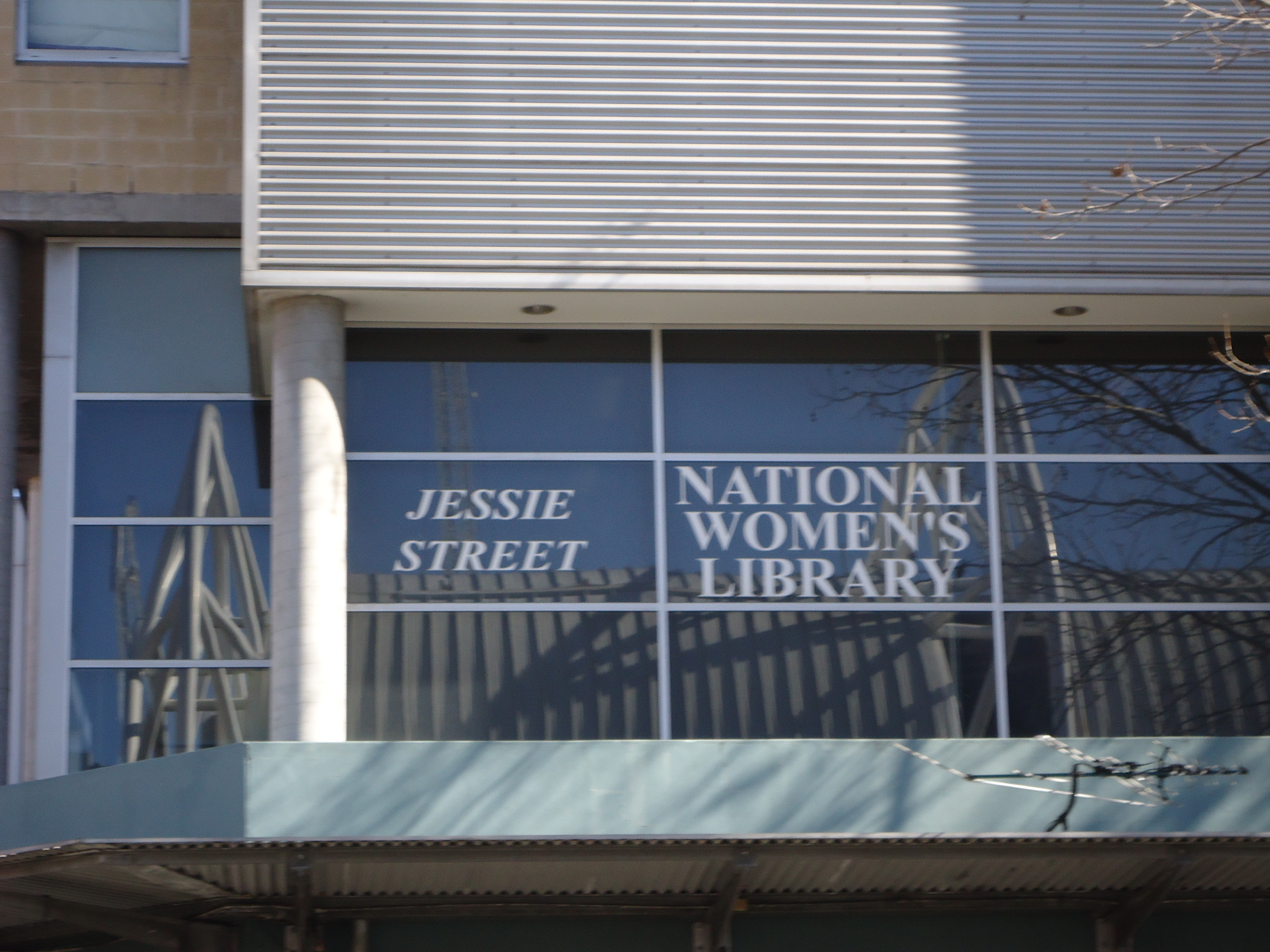
Exterior view of Jessie Street National Women's Library

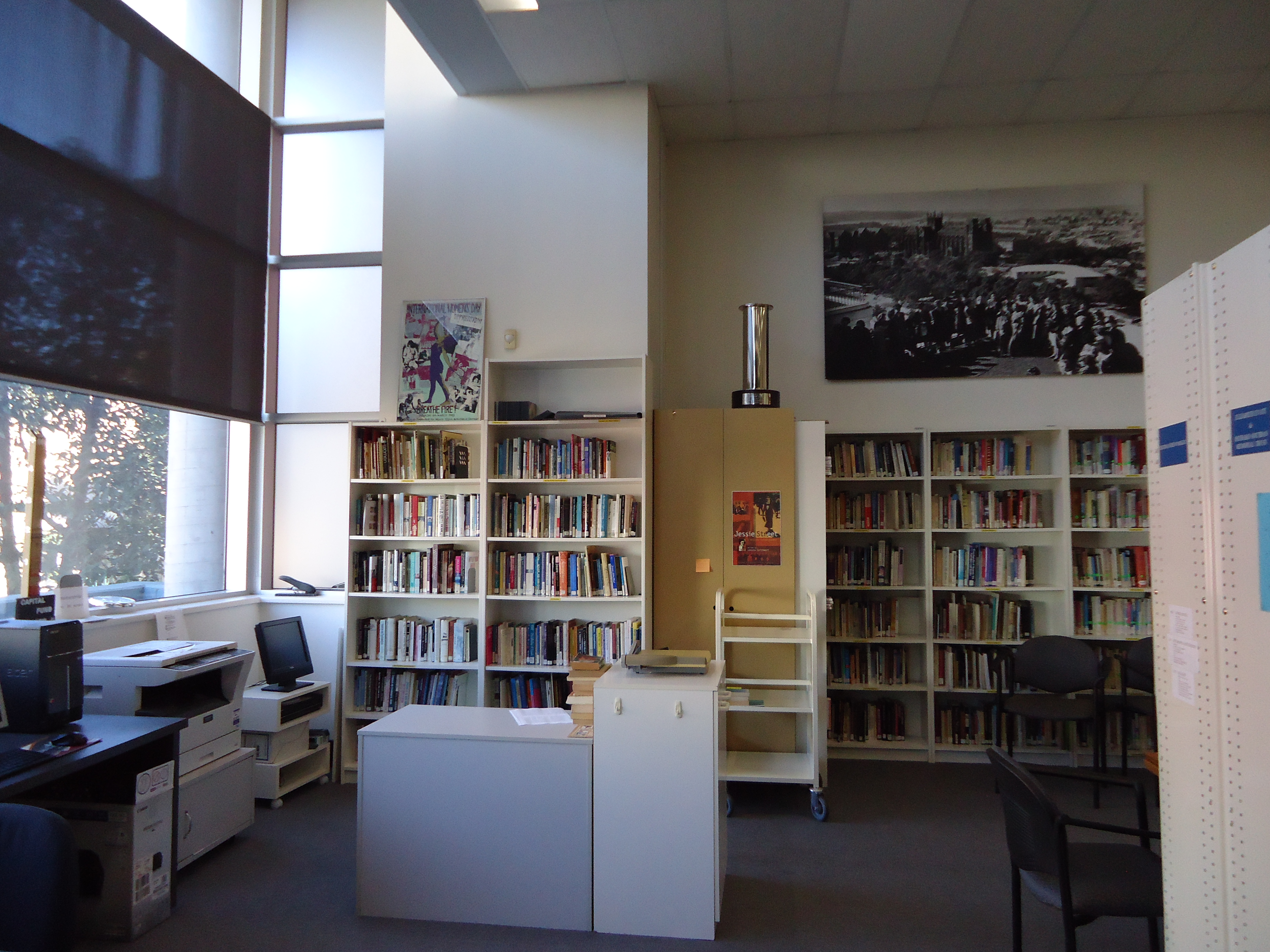
Interior view of Jessie Street National Women's Library

=== In memory of Jessie Street ===
Jessie Street (1889 – 1970) fought hard for many years as an advocate for women's rights in Australia. She was a key figure in Australian political life for over 50 years, well known for campaigning for human rights and women's issues. In 1945 at the founding of the United Nations she was the only female Australian delegate. In 1967 she initiated a successful amendment to the Australian constitution to remove discriminatory references to Aborigines.

== Collections ==
The collections include archives of the papers of Australian women's organisations, the personal papers and letters, diaries and journals of Australian women and also audio recordings of interviews. Many of the books and personal archives in the collection have been donated, including 500 books donated from the estate of feminist Eva Maria and a collection of 110 books by or about Virginia Woolf. One source reports that it is Australia's largest collection of feminist posters.

In 1993 the former Canberra Women's Archive was donated to the collection.

The library contains an archival collection of documents relating to the Louisa Lawson House, a mental healthcare centre for women that operated from 1982 to 1994.

== See also ==
- Lespar Library of Women's Liberation
- The Women's Library
