= The Austra-laise =

Poem by C. J. Dennis

- by C. J. Dennis
- Original title: "A Real Australian Austra--laise"
- Written: 1908
- First published in: The Bulletin
- Country: Australia
- Language: English
- Publication date: 12 November 1908

Full text
- The Australaise at Wikisource

"The Austra-laise" is a poem by Australian writer C.J. Dennis that was first published in The Bulletin magazine on 12 November 1908 as an entry in a National Song Competition which drew 74 entries. The entry was entitled "A Real Australian Austra--laise", and won its author a special prize.

The poem is also known by the titles "The Austrabloodyaise" and " A Real Australian Austra-laise". It can be sung to the tune of "Onward Christian Soldiers".

Originally published as a set of four verses in 1908, with blanks instead of dashes and under the byline "A. J. Dennis", the poem was expanded later to its now-familiar 7 stanzas.

It was later included in the author's poetry collections Backblock Ballads and Other Verses (1913) and Backblock Ballads and Later Verses (1918). It was subsequently reprinted in various newspaper and magazines, as well as in the poetry anthologies: Complete Book of Australian Folklore edited by Bill Scott (1976); An Illustrated Treasury of Australian Verse edited by Beatrice Davis (1984); and The Penguin Book of Australian Humorous Verse edited by Bill Scott (1984).

Dennis was rather staggered by the success of the poem, writing to William Moore, the art critic, "Without any guff it really surprised me to see the Australaise so popular. It was written originally as a joke on the editor of the Red Page [of The Bulletin] and was not intended for publication. Since then, comments upon it have turned up from all sorts of unlikely places - the centre of Africa, Fiji, and now London."

Footnote to 1915 edition: "Where a dash (——) replaces a missing word, the adjective "blessed" may be interpolated. In cases demanding great emphasis, the use of the word "blooming" is permissible. However, any other word may be used that suggests itself as suitable." Earlier editions also included this footnote: "(With some acknowledgements to W. T. Goodge.)". All mention of Goodge had disappeared by 1918.

Dennis's acknowledgement to W.T. Goodge refers to that author's poem "The Great Australian Adjective" published in The Bulletin on 11 December 1897. Goodge's poem begins:

The sunburnt ---- stockman stood
And, in a dismal ---- mood,
Apostrophized his ---- cuddy;
"The ---- nag's no ---- good,
He couldn't earn his ---- food -
A regular ---- brumby,
----!"

== See also ==
- 1908 in poetry
- 1908 in Australian literature
- Australian literature
