= 1857 in Australian literature =

This article presents a list of the historical events and publications of Australian literature during 1857.

== Books ==
- Louisa Atkinson – Gertrude, the Emigrant: A Tale of Colonial Life
- Friedrich Gerstaecker — The Two Convicts

== Poetry ==
- Ralph Brookes – "Lines to Moreton Bay"
- Charles Harpur – "A Coast View" (a.k.a. "Coast Scenery")

== Births ==
A list, ordered by date of birth (and, if the date is either unspecified or repeated, ordered alphabetically by surname) of births in 1857 of Australian literary figures, authors of written works or literature-related individuals follows, including year of death.

- 4 June — Barbara Baynton, poet and novelist (died 1929)
- 13 June — Hubert Church, poet (died 1932)
- 22 September — James Hebblethwaite, poet (died 1921)
- 21 December — Nat Gould, journalist and novelist (died 1919)

Unknown date

- Walter D. White, poet (died 1941)

== See also ==
- 1857 in poetry
- 1857 in literature
- List of years in literature
- List of years in Australian literature
