= The Lonely Crossing and Other Poems =

1905 poetry collection by Louisa Lawson

- Author: Louisa Lawson
- Language: English
- Genre: Poetry collection
- Publisher: Dawn
- Publication date: 1905
- Publication place: Australia
- Media type: Print
- Pages: 96pp

The Lonely Crossing and Other Poems (1905) is a collection of poems by Australian poet Louisa Lawson. It was the only collection of her work published during her lifetime.

The collection includes 52 poems by the author that are reprinted from various sources, although most appeared first in The Dawn, an early Australian feminist magazine that Lawson also edited.

== Contents ==
- "The Lonely Crossing"
- "Coming Home"
- "Back Again"
- "The Hour is Come"
- "A Friend in Need"
- "Twilight"
- "The Reformers"
- "The Hill of Death"
- "The Digger's Daughter"
- "To a Libertine"
- "The Song of Bacchus"
- "A Pound a Mile"
- "Light in Darkness"
- "Lines Written During a Night Spent in a Bush Inn"
- "Another for the Queen"
- "A Plea for Australia"
- "Australia"
- "The Winter Wind"
- "An Australian Song"
- "The Squatter's Wife"
- "God Give Me Gold"
- "A Life's Dream"
- "Lines"
- "The Message of the Flowers"
- "So Many a Deed of Wrong for Right is Meant"
- "Renunciation"
- "A Dream"
- "Woman's Love"
- "Divided"
- "The Petunia"
- "A Reverie"
- "Buried Love"
- "Lines"
- "A Dream"
- "The City Bird"
- "In Memoriam"
- "A Grave"
- "To My Sister"
- "I Wonder?"
- "In Memory of R.E.H."
- "In Memoriam"
- "My Nettie"
- "In Memoriam"
- "A Child's Question"
- "A Mother's Answer"
- "All's Well"
- "To a Bird" (1892)
- "To a Bird" (1888)
- "A Reverie"
- "Lines"
- "Give Me Only Peace"
- "Sunset"

== Critical reception ==
On its original publication, a review in The Freeman's Journal noted, "The literary level reached in these fugitive products of a life which has been too strenuous for dalliance with the Muses may not reach the highest level of poesy; but they have the true sweet note of the simple lyric and are faithful to nature whether of the observative or contemplative order. More than that, they are an earnest that the authoress might worthily vest herself, if she would, in the singing robes of Australia."

In a minor review, The Maitland Weekly Mercury noted, "Her life has been one of hard work, and of many struggles against adverse circumstances, but these experiences have probably only the better fitted her to write many sweet and helpful sonnets for the encouragement of her countrywomen."

== See also ==
- The full text of the collection is available from the University of Sydney
- 1905 in Australian literature
- 1905 in poetry
