= Jim of the Hills =

1919 poetry collection by C. J. Dennis

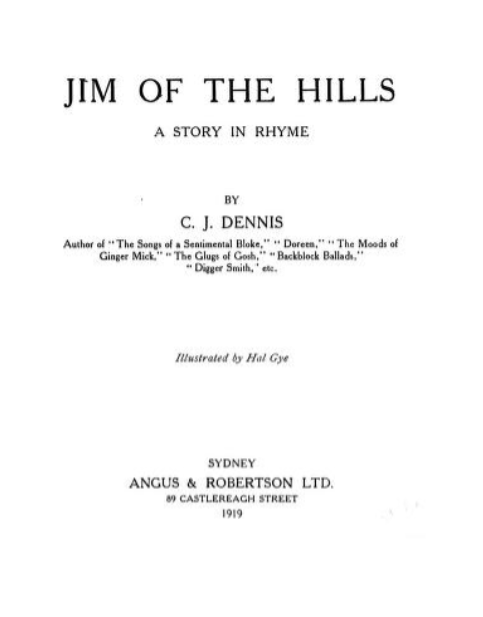
- Title page for Jim of the Hills (1919)
- Author: C. J. Dennis
- Language: English
- Genre: Poetry collection
- Publisher: Angus and Robertson
- Publication date: 1919
- Publication place: Australia
- Media type: Print
- Pages: 93 pp

Jim of the Hills is a collection of poems by Australian poet and journalist C. J. Dennis, published by Angus and Robertson, in 1919. The collection includes two illustrated plates by Hal Gye.

The collection tells the story of Jim, a timber-getter in the Victorian Alps, who is pursued by "the widow", who attempts to entice him into marriage.

All of the twelve poems in the collection were published here for the first time.

== Contents ==
- "Swingin' Douglas"
- "A Lonely Man"
- "A Morning Song"
- "A Freak of Spring"
- "The Vision"
- "Old Bob Blair"
- "The Wooer"
- "Red Robin"
- "Murray's Ride"
- "The Reaper in the Bush"
- "Flames"
- "Grey Thrush"

== Critical reception ==
A reviewer in the Sunday Times (Sydney) wasn't convinced about the collection: "It is a slight thing, but honest There is in it little or none of the sugary flapdoodle that made The Sentimental Bloke unpleasant to cultivated palates. The tale is short and simple." He went on to compare Dennis's work with that of Henry Lawson: "Mr. Lawson is a poet; that is the point at which he differs from Mr. Dennis, who is more often, a journalist writing fluent verses."

In The Bulletin the book's reviewer was also unimpressed: "Dennis will add nothing to his laurels by Jim of the Hills, but he will hold the circle of readers that he has won."

== Publication history ==
After the initial publication of the collection by Angus and Robertson in 1919, it was reissued as by the same publisher in 1983.

== Note ==
A second edition of the collection was printed in 1920, which brought the number of copies in print to 10,000.

== See also ==
- 1919 in Australian literature
- "Chapter 10: Diggers and Timber Getters, 1918-1919" in An Unsentimental Bloke: The Life and Work of C. J. Dennis by Philip Butterss
