= John Reay Watson =

Australian journalist and writer

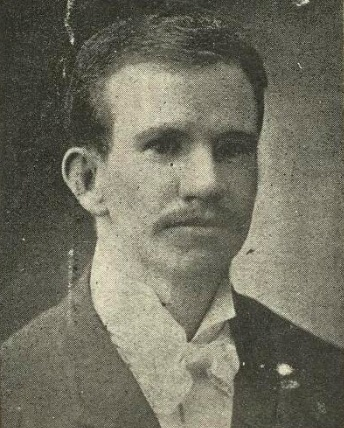
John Reay Watson in 1899.

John Reay Watson (23 May 1872 — 12 June 1944) was an Australian journalist and writer. He was the brother of politician Duncan Watson.

Watson was born in Tinonee, New South Wales. He worked as a bank clerk in Queensland, and then for The Sydney Morning Herald, Melbourne Argus, and The Age. He married Rose Coyle in 1905. He was sent to London as a special correspondent for The Age in 1911, where he reported on politics, theatre, and music, before returning to Australia in 1925. He continued to manage The Age's literary supplement after his return to Australia.

Watson published short stories in The Bulletin for a number of years, as well as two novels in Australia. He later co-authored a pair of mystery novels in England with Arthur J. Rees.

He died in Melbourne in 1944.

== Works ==
- In a man's Mind (1896)
- An Earthly Fulfilment (1899)
- The Hampstead Mystery (1916) (with Arthur J. Rees)
- The Mystery of the Downs (1918) (with Arthur J. Rees)
