= The Women's Library, Sydney =

Community-based library and a hub of lesbian and feminist activity

The Women's Library
- 33°53′43″S 151°10′51″E
- Location: 8-10 Brown Street, Newtown NSW, Australia
- Type: Library
- Established: 1992

Access and use
- Access requirements: Open to members

Other information
- Website: The Women's Library

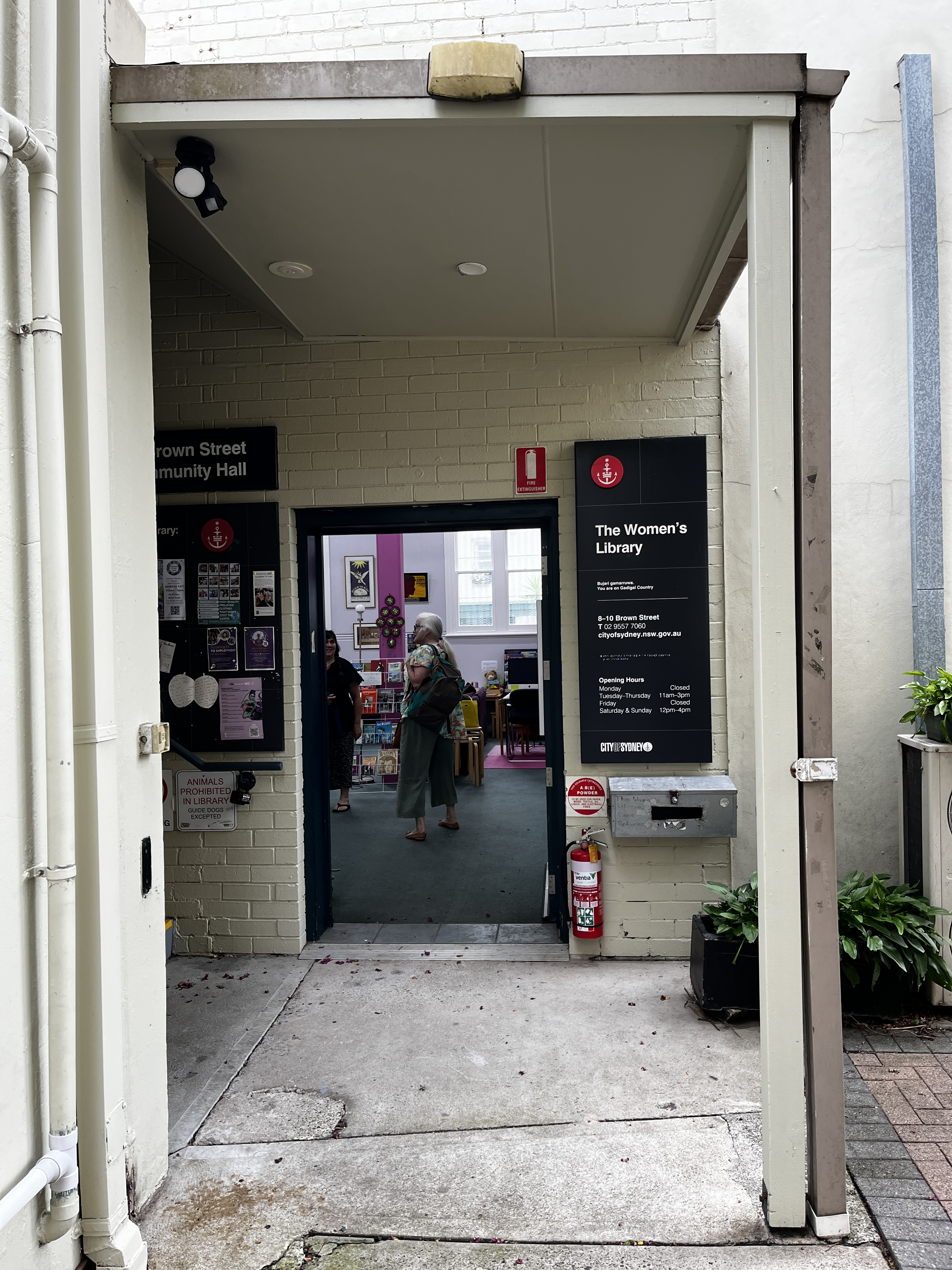
The entrance to The Women's Library, behind Newtown Library

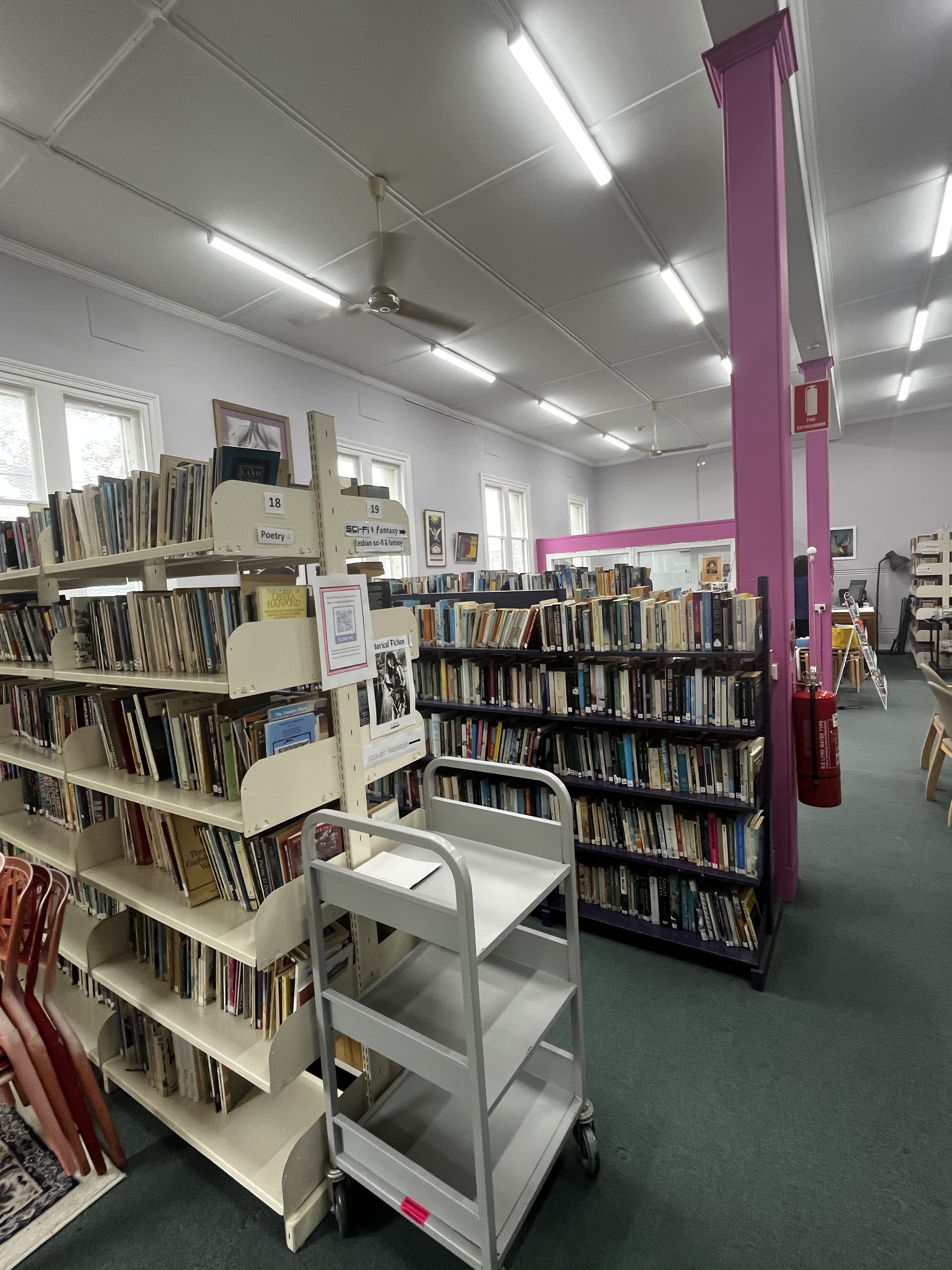
An internal view of the library space

The Women's Library ("TWL") in Newtown, Sydney, Australia, is a community-based library and a hub of lesbian and feminist activity. It stocks books "by women, for women" and aims to make feminist and lesbian literature more accessible.

== Activities ==
The Women's Library has been built on the efforts of volunteers and the donations of thousands of women since its establishment. It continues to be fully managed and staffed by volunteers and the collection of donated books and periodicals numbers approximately 20,000 items. It is an example of an urban commons.

A diverse range of lesbian and feminist groups have called The Women's Library their home over the years, using the space as a meeting place outside of opening hours. Other groups have held their Annual General Meetings at this venue.

The Women's Library has also been used as an art exhibition space and hosts many cultural activities and events including book launches, women's choirs, film nights, drumming circles and art therapy classes

The Women's Library is a separate entity from the Jessie Street National Women's Library which is also located in Sydney and has a greater archival and research focus.

== History ==
Work on setting up The Women's Library commenced in 1991 when a group of women decided there was a need for a library focused on lesbian and feminist literature along the lines of the Women's Library in England. A long list of prominent Australian women supported its establishment including Eva Cox, Ann Deveson, Justice Elizabeth Evatt, Dorothy Hewitt, Caroline Jones, Clover Moore, Meredith Bergman, Sandra Nori, Dale Spender, Faith Bandler and Bobbie Sykes.

With the coordination of Vicki Harding, it was formally established as an incorporated association in 1992 to comprise a lending library, a reference library, an information exchange and community centre. Under its constitution it is stated that it should "be a safe and supportive space where women, including lesbians, can relax, read, study and exchange information".

In 1993 it was nominated for Best New Parade Entry in the annual Gay & Lesbian Mardi Gras Parade. In 1993 The Women's Library also became a registered charity, enabling it to receive tax deductible donations. It opened its doors in its first home in the Alexandria Town Hall in 1994. It moved to its current home in Brown Street, Newtown in January 1998 and continues to occupy these premises, courtesy of an accommodation grant provided through the City of Sydney Council.

In 2016 The Women's Library received an Edna Ryan Award for making a feminist difference through its contributions to the Arts. The award was accepted by Vicki Harding who had returned as Public Officer. It celebrated 20 years in Newtown in May 2018.

== See also ==
- Jessie Street National Women's Library
- Lespar Library of Women's Liberation
