= Lespar Library of Women's Liberation =

Feminist library in Perth, Western Australia

- Location: Geoffrey Bolton Library, Murdoch University, Murdoch Western Australia
- Established: 1979

Collection
- Size: 3000

Other information
- Parent organisation: GALAWA
- Website: collectionswa.net.au/node/116416

The Lespar Library of Women's Liberation is a Western Australian feminist library.

The library was opened in 1979 in a building owned by Karin Hoffmann at Darlington, Western Australia.

There are some 3000 titles in its collection. It is housed within the Gay and Lesbian Archives of Western Australia (GALAWA), located in the Geoffrey Bolton Library at Murdoch University.

Holdings include international as well as Australian feminist magazines, including the Union of Australian Women's Our Women (1953–1971), Everything: Anarchist Feminist Magazine (1979–1985), As If (1973) and Lip, A Feminist Arts Journal (1976–1984).

The library's catalogue has not been digitised, but three editions have been published in book form, the most recent in 1986.

== See also ==
- Jessie Street National Women's Library
- The Women's Library
