= Gertrude, the Emigrant: A Tale of Colonial Life =

Novel by Australian writer Louisa Atkinson

- Author: Louisa Atkinson
- Language: English
- Genre: Fiction
- Publisher: J. R. Clarke
- Publication date: 1857
- Publication place: Australia
- Media type: Print
- Preceded by: -
- Followed by: The Isle of Vines : A Fairy Tale for Old and Young

Gertrude, the Emigrant: A Tale of Colonial Life (1857) is a novel by Australian writer Louisa Atkinson.

The novel was "the first Australian novel written by a native-born woman and the first to be illustrated by its author".

== Synopsis ==
The novel is set on a station in the south-east of New South Wales and follows the story of a young emigrant woman, Gertrude, who is the orphaned daughter of a German father and an English mother. Gertrude travels to the station to work as a housekeeper and gradually becomes a part of the social structure of this new country.

== Critical reception ==
Bill Holloway, writing for the Australian Women Writers Challenge website noted: "What makes it most interesting, not just for being 'first', is the detailed descriptions of the country, of country life, and of country people. Atkinson is a talented writer. We like and understand her principal characters – Gertrude, Mrs Doherty, Mr Tudor, Charles – but there are a large number of secondary characters, individual, well described, and likeable.

"There are Aboriginal people living on the edges of Mrs Doherty’s property and it is notable that they are described sympathetically, and where appropriate, individually."

Grace Moore, writing for the "Victorian Review" found the novel "remarkable for its attentiveness to the landscape and climate."

== Publication history ==
After its original publication in 1857 in the Australia by publishers J. R. Clarke the novel was not re-published until:

- Mulini Press, Australia, 1998

== See also ==
- 1857 in Australian literature
