= Force and Fraud: A Tale of the Bush =

Novel by Australian writer Ellen Davitt

- Author: Ellen Davitt
- Language: English
- Genre: Fiction
- Publication date: 1865
- Publication place: Australia
- Media type: Print
- Followed by: Uncle Vincent: Or, Love and Hatred

Force and Fraud: A Tale of the Bush (1865) is a crime novel by Australian writer Ellen Davitt.

It was originally published as a serial in The Australian Journal in 12 instalments between 2 September and 18 November 1865. It has been identified, by author and literary researcher Lucy Sussex, as Australia's first mystery novel.

== Synopsis ==
McAlphin, a Scottish immigrant squatter, is found murdered. Chief suspect is Herbert Lindsey, fiancé of McAlpin's daughter Flora. Also involved is McAlphin's overseer Pierce Silverton who lies to Flora in order to get her to marry him.

== Critical reception ==
Catherine Pratt in The Canberra Times praised the book: "This murder mystery novel recounts 'a tale of the bush' in which a young artist is accused of murdering his fiancee's father. Herbert is exonerated, largely through the tenacious efforts of Flora, his fiancee. The murderer, however, remains undiscovered and the narrative tension undiluted as Davitt teases the reader with scattered clues, unpredictable characters and possible resolutions."

== Publication history ==
After its original publication in 1898 in The Australian Journal the novel was published as follows:

- Mulini Press, 1993
- Clan Destine Press, 2015
- Grattan Street Press, 2017

== See also ==
- 1865 in Australian literature
- Davitt Award
