= Louisa Lawson House =

Sydney mental health centre

Louisa Lawson House (LLH) was a mental health centre for women in Leichhardt, New South Wales that operated from 1982 to 1994. Named after Australian feminist Louisa Lawson, it operated as an alternative to mainstream psychiatry, featuring yoga, meditation, conflict resolution training, and anxiety management training. In 1986, the centre opened a minor tranquiliser clinic to help women with withdrawal symptoms from addictive tranquilisers which were in circulation at the time. One division called the "halfway house", launched in September 1985, was a program to provide housing to women with emotional problems, and it was launched with funding from the local department of youth and community services.

== History ==
Louisa Lawson House was formed by members of the women's liberation movement (WLM), which began in Sydney in 1969. The Sydney branch of WLM prioritised women's health, childcare policy reform and equal pay for equal work. LLH began initially as a branch of the Leichhardt Women's Community Health Centre (LWCHC) which was founded in 1974 to provide women's health services.In 1979, a group of women from LWCHC collaborated with a Sydney anti-psychiatry group Positive Alternatives to Psychiatry to form LLH.

At the time, there was internal disagreement about whether to accept or apply for state funding among activists in Sydney women's refuge groups. In December 1981 the NSW Housing Commission granted LWCHC a building to use for what would be the Louisa Lawson House, although the organisation lacked resources and staff necessary to operate it until a large anonymous donation.

Beginning in 1985, LLH gradually secured increasing state funds to facilitate operation such as for the "halfway house". In the process, the organisation became more bureaucratic and less politically engaged, stopping feminist activism which was not relevant to securing funding. LLH shifted from a feminist refuge to a women's counselling service, marked by a change in name to Louisa Lawson Centre with the name officially changed in 1989.
