= The Great Australian Adjective =

W. T. Goodge poem

- by W. T. Goodge
- First published in: The Bulletin
- Country: Australia
- Language: English
- Publication date: 11 December 1897
- Preceded by: "The Oozelum Bird"
- Followed by: "The Australian (New South Wales Variety)"

Full text
- The Great Australian Adjective at Wikisource

The Great Australian Adjective is a humorous poem by English writer and poet W. T. Goodge. It was first published in The Bulletin magazine on 11 December 1897, the Christmas issue of that publication, and later in the poet's only collection Hits! Skits! and Jingles!. The poem was originally published with the title "-----!", a subtitle of "The Great Australian Adjective" and was signed as by "The Colonel", a regular pseudonym of Goodge's.

== Analysis ==
The poem is written with a number of words "blanked out", allowing the reader to substitute whatever they choose. For example:

The sunburnt ---- stockman stood
And, in a dismal ---- mood,
Apostrophized his ---- cuddy;
"The ---- nag's no ---- good,
He couldn't earn his ---- food -
A regular ---- brumby,
----!"

Bill Hornadge, in The Australian Slanguage, his survey of Australian English and its usage, states that "The word BLOODY has for so long been called the Great Australian Adjective", and explains that "The Bulletin is generally given the credit for naming 'bloody' as The Great Australian Adjective (in 1894) explaining that it called it this: '...because it is more used and used more exclusively by Australians than by any other allegedly civilised nation.'"

In 1927, in a piece in The Sydney Morning Herald, A. G. Stephens lamented the over-use of the word "bloody" in everyday speech, though he himself doesn't use the word in his essay. "We are not referring to the literary use of one particular word. An American author so well known as Fenimore Cooper, for example, uses it frequently in some of his nautical romances, in order to depict the character of a rough seaman at the beginning of the last century. That does not excuse its vulgar use nowadays, and the literary jesting with the word by such Australian writers as Goodge and Dennis, however excusable, is not the most creditable feature of their writings."

== Cultural references ==
C. J. Dennis acknowledged this poem when he came to publish his own work, "The Austra-laise", which uses the same stylistic trick of leaving the reader to supply missing words of their choice.

== Further publications ==
- Complete Book of Australian Folklore edited by Bill Scott (1976)
- Australian Verse from 1805 : A Continuum edited by Geoffrey Dutton (1976)
- The Penguin Book of Australian Humorous Verse edited by Bill Scott (1984)
- Old Ballads from the Bush edited by Bill Scott (1987)
- Australian Bush Poems (1991)
- An Australian Treasury of Popular Verse edited by Jim Haynes (2002)
- Our Country : Classic Australian Poetry : From the Colonial Ballads to Paterson & Lawson edited by Michael Cook (2004)
- An Anthology of Australian Poetry to 1920 edited by John Kinsella (2007)
- The Penguin Anthology of Australian Poetry edited by John Kinsella (2009)

== See also ==
- 1897 in poetry
- 1897 in literature
- 1897 in Australian literature
- Australian literature
