= The Recollections of Geoffry Hamlyn =

Novel by British writer Henry Kingsley

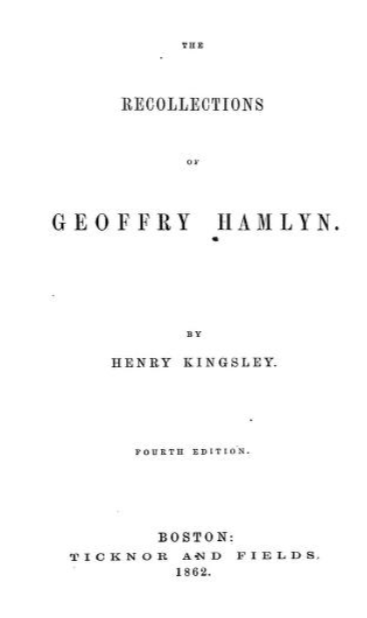
- Title page for The Recollections of Geoffry Hamlyn (1862)
- Author: Henry Kingsley
- Language: English
- Genre: Fiction
- Publisher: Macmillan
- Publication date: 1859
- Publication place: United Kingdom
- Media type: Print

The Recollections of Geoffry Hamlyn (1859) is a novel by British writer Henry Kingsley.

In its first edition the novel was published in three volumes comprising 275, 324 and 275 pages respectively.

== Synopsis ==
The novel is a chronicle of three families — the Buckleys, the Thorntons and the Brentwoods — and covers the period from the 1780s to 1858. The first part of the novel is mainly set in Devon, England, where a marriage proposal is rejected. The proposer decides to leave England and emigrates to Australia with Geoffry Hamlyn, while the other party elopes and falls on bad times. In the second part the Buckley and Thornton families also migrate to Australia where they settle in the Monaro district in New South Wales as pastoralists. The third part of the novel focuses on the next generation of the families in Australia, with some remaining in Australia and some returning to England.

The whole novel is told as if being read aloud by Geoffry Hamyln to Major and Agnes Buckley and Captain Brentwood in 1857.

== Critical reception ==
In The Sydney Morning Herald a reviewer noted: "A writer who has spent the best years of his life in Australia might surely have learned to look upon her destiny in a higher aspect than as a field for the development of sordid money-making propensities. The rise of young empires and the gradual progress of their social institutions, would furnish ample materials of interest to a writer so well acquainted with the colonies, quite as acceptable to English readers, if we mistake not, as encounters with aborigines and bushrangers, or details of personal aggrandisement. The author describes himself as a 'prentice hand,' but looks forward to meeting his readers again. If he should in his next work lay the scenes in these colonies, we hope he may take a broader view of their capabilities and destinies."

A writer in The Oxford Companion to Australian Literature called the novel "An emigrant success story which presented Australia largely as a pastoral Eden. The Recollections of Geoffry Hamlyn influenced the direction of Australian fiction by providing a romance model for later successful writers such as 'Rolf Boldrewood'."

== Publication history ==
After its original publication in 1859 in the United Kingdom by Macmillan the novel was published, in two editions, as follows:

=== First edition ===
- Ticknor and Fields, USA, 1859 — one volume, 525pp
- Dodd and Mead, USA, 188?
- Oxford University Press, UK, 1924

=== Second edition ===
An introduction to the Australian Academy Editions publication in 1997 noted: "Kingsley's revisions to the first edition did 'not amount to a thorough or extensive re-thinking of the novel' but were 'confined to adding footnotes and other light, often deft, touches to the wording here and there.'"

- Macmillan, UK, 1860 — one volume, 433pp
- Chapman and Hall, UK, 1872
- Ward, Locke and Bowden, UK, 1893, reprinted 1894
- E. W. Cole, Australia, 1894, reprinted 1895
- Wardlow, Canada, 1894
- Collins, UK, 1899
- Angus and Robertson, Australis, 1993

As well as many other editions.

== Geoffry Hamlyn Tells ==
The book was serialised for radio in 1939 as Geoffry Hamlyn Tells. This was produced by George Edwards. It replaced Crazy People.

According to Wireless Weekly "Geoffry Hamlyn takes little part in the story, being a detached observer and rather a philosopher of life in general. The story commences in the little English village of Brumston. and deals with a group of people hi widely different walks of life. The lives of these people cross each other, and eventually they find themselves in the colony of New South Wales. Once again their lives cross, and in the colorful background of the early days of the colony tense arid dramatic situations take place."

== See also ==
- 1859 in Australian literature
