= The Gentle Water Bird =

1926 poem by Australian poet John Shaw Neilson

- by John Shaw Neilson
- Written: 1926
- First published in: The Sydney Morning Herald
- Country: Australia
- Language: English
- Publication date: 10 April 1926

Full text
- The Gentle Water Bird at Wikisource

"The Gentle Water Bird" (1926) is a poem by Australian poet John Shaw Neilson.

It was originally published in The Sydney Morning Herald on 10 April 1926, as by "Shaw Neilson", and was subsequently reprinted in the author's single-author collections and a number of Australian poetry anthologies.

The poem details how the poet sees God in his study of a crane landing on water.

== Critical reception ==
In his biography of Shaw Neilson for The Advocate Bernard O'Brien wrote: "His family was Scottish and Presbyterian, and his mother had a touch of melancholy which made his early religious training very severe. As a boy he was not allowed even to go out walking on Sunday. But an interesting poem, "The Gentle Water Bird," tells how he arrived at a truer idea of religion and of God. Watching the cranes in the reeds, it suddenly struck him that the God Who created these lovely creatures, and provided them with such a peaceful, contented existence, must Himself be attractive, loving and kind. The poem salutes the bird as a messenger from heaven, and his whole life was nourished by that conviction."

== Publication history ==
After the poem's initial publication in The Sydney Morning Herald it was reprinted as follows:

- New Poems by John Shaw Neilson, Bookfellow (1927)
- Collected Poems of John Shaw Neilson by John Shaw Neilson, Lothian (1934)
- Cross-Country : A Book of Australian Verse edited by John Barnes and Brian MacFarlane, Heinemann (1984)
- Anthology of Australian Religious Poetry edited by Les Murray, Collins Dove (1986)
- John Shaw Neilson : Poetry, Autobiography and Correspondence edited by Cliff Hanna, UQP (1991)
- Hell and After : Four Early English-Language Poets of Australia edited by Les Murray, Carcanet (2005)
- Collected Verse of John Shaw Neilson edited by Margaret Roberts, UWA Publishing (2012)

== See also ==
- 1926 in Australian literature
- 1926 in poetry
