= A Curate in Bohemia =

- Based on: A Curate in Bohemia by Norman Lindsay
- Written by: Michael Boddy
- Directed by: Alan Burke
- Country of origin: Australia
- Original language: English

Production
- Running time: 60 minutes

Original release
- Release: 1972

A Curate in Bohemia is a 1972 Australian TV play based on the 1913 novel by Norman Lindsay of the same name. It was one of a series of adaptations of Lindsay works on the ABC in 1972.

== Plot ==
A man considering entering the priesthood falls in with some artists.

== Production ==
Series producer Alan Burke said "A Curate in Bohemia, written when Lindsay was a very young man, is like a Marx Brothers knockabout farce. And we played it like that.

== Cast ==
- Bryan Davies
- Reg Livermore
- Ray Gurney
