= Gina Ballantyne =

Australian poet (1919–1973)

- Born: 18 June 1919 Adelaide, South Australia
- Died: 25 July 1973 (aged 54) Central Coast, New South Wales, Australia
- Occupation: poet
- Notable works: "Vision"
- Notable awards: C. J. Dennis Memorial Competition, 1942

Gina Ballantyne (18 June 1919 – 25 July 1973) was an Australian poet, who also wrote as Allinga. She was the first woman to edit an edition of the annual Jindyworobak Anthology.

== Early life and education ==
Born on 18 June 1919 in Adelaide, Gina Ballantyne moved with her family to Sydney in 1922. At 10, she was awarded a midget certificate as a Sunbeamer by The Sun. She was educated at Hillview School, Manly where she was dux and won the scripture prize in 1932. She then completed her secondary education at Balgowlah Grammar School.

== Career ==
Ballantyne won a prize for her essay on the 1933 Natural History Exhibition and included a four-line poem about the platypus, with an illustration. From 1934 her poems and other writing appeared in the children's pages edited by South West Wind in The Sydney Morning Herald.

Her poem, "Vision", won the 1942 C. J. Dennis Memorial Competition from 70 entries.

In 1945 Ballantyne edited the annual Jindyworobak Anthology, the first woman to do so. The poetry reviewer for The West Australian claimed it "is in many respects the best of the series. The verse is more varied, and, while less pretentious, reaches an even and satisfying level of expression" and concluded that she is " one of the most promising of the new school" and "has made a good selection". The Catholic Weekly, however, commented that she had included poems by some young women "too slight and immature to warrant publication".

Her poems were published in the Jindyworobak Anthology of 1943, 1944, 1945, 1947, 1948.

== Publications ==
- Phantom, F. W. Preece Ltd, 1942
- Vagrant, Jindyworobak Publications, 1943
- Jindyworobak Anthology, 1945, editor, Jindyworobak Publications in conjunction with Georgian House, 1945
