= Hits! Skits! and Jingles! =

Poetry collection by Australian poet W. T. Goodge

- Second edition (1904)
- Editor: W. T. Goodge
- Language: English
- Publisher: Bulletin
- Publication date: 1899
- Publication place: Australia
- Media type: Print (Hardback)
- Pages: 172 pp.

Hits! Skits! and Jingles! (1899) is the only collection of poems by English-Australian poet W. T. Goodge published in his lifetime. It was published in hardback by the Bulletin in Sydney N.S.W. in 1899

The collection includes 167 poems by the author. A note in the first edition states: "Many of these rhymes appeared in The Bulletin, The Sunday Times, and The Orange Leader."

== Contents ==
- "The Oozlum Bird"
- "Why?"
- "The Baby"
- "Drifting Down the Darling"
- "Socialism and Anarchy"
- "The Only Bank Not To Be Robbed"
- "How We Drove the Trotter"
- "What Boots It?"
- "The Fool Who Means No Harm"
- "A Love Song"
- "The Modern Woman"
- "To the Impressionist School"
- "Town and Country"
- "Actress and Artist"
- "The Lay of the Lovelorn Larrikin"
- "Who Wrote the Shakespere Plays?"
- "On His Own"
- "Ode to Maoriland"
- ""Shouting"
- "The Frog in the Well"
- "A Back-Block Settlement"
- "A Quatrain"
- "Tobacco"
- "Two Fools"
- "The Rocking-Chair"
- "They Went to Law"
- "The Daffodil Dance"
- "Kerosene"
- "The Old Dutch Clock"
- "The Australian"
- "How We Look at It"
- "Who Stole the Ponies?"
- "Station Life"
- "Come to Orange"
- "Two Men and a Maid"
- "King Whiskey"
- "How He Died"
- "Character and Reputation"
- "The Shearer's Life"
- "The Way of It"
- "The Melodious Bullocky"
- "The Jubilee Girl"
- "Praying for Rain"
- "The Burglar's Song"
- "Life"
- "Civilization"
- "The Phases of the Ego"
- "A Bad Break"
- "Jamberoora Flat"
- "Ode to the Fryingpan"
- "The Bogan Scrub"
- "Christmas Bells"
- "Mealy Mary Ann"
- "Alas"
- "The Simple Chinese Plan"
- "The Postman"
- "The Small Boy's Whistle"
- "The Looming Invasion"
- "When the Comps. are Callin'!"
- "The Moral of Trilby"
- "The Smithfield Tandem Bike"
- "Fast"
- "Clay and China"
- "The Man and the Paper"
- "Alas and Alackaday"
- "What Do You Want?"
- "Our Dog Jim"
- "The Maloni Evolution"
- "Two Hypocrites"
- "What is Luck?"
- "A Genuine Bush Song"
- "The Pendulum"
- "Oozleum"
- "The Mickity-Mulga Football Match"
- "The Olden Golden Days"
- "Romance and Reality"
- "The Cruellest Cut"
- "Scorching"
- "When Matilda Hangs the Washing on the Line"
- "Abu Ben Mahomet"
- "A Great Performance"
- "The Fate of Tate"
- "Dan the Bullocky"
- "Spring, Sweet Spring!"
- "Explains It"
- "The Quarter-Back"
- "The New Chum and the 'Possum"
- "Lip Tip Cat"
- "Three Roses"
- "Water on the Brain"
- ""'98""
- "Dead Sea Fruit"
- "Quay!"
- "Bandy Pat of Blue Gum Flat"
- "Australia's Wisdom"
- "The Pharisee and Sadducee"
- "Federation"
- "Queen Wilhelmina and the Bicycle"
- "Katzenjammer"
- "The Month of May"
- "Love and the Cycles"
- "Rural Politics"
- "The Godly Johnsons"
- "The Mosquito and the Politician"
- "Bundabah"
- "The Great Australian Adjective"
- "A Sad Case"
- "The Politician"
- "The New Anatomy"
- "Whew!"
- "Why Indeed?"
- "A Dismal Tale"
- "On Paper!"
- "The Average M.P."
- "The Breath of Smelson"
- "Same Old Style"
- "The Indian Hawker"
- "The Girl For Us"
- "The Long-Bow"
- "The Post Office Pen"
- "Slippery Bill"
- "On the Old Barcoo"
- "The Loafer's Lay"
- "Room at the Top"
- "Old Man Canobolas"
- "Human Nature"
- "The Out-of-Works"
- "Home Rule"
- "The Woman Who Didn't"
- "The Difference"
- "Australian Literature"
- "What It's Coming To"
- "The Mining Mart"
- "The Rural Politicians"
- "The Truthful Man"
- "The Australian Slanguage" Note: With the title "The Great Australian Slanguage"
- "Maud"
- "The Use of Diplomacy"
- "The Bush Missionary"
- "The Shearer's Cook"
- "The Tugs of Simpsonville"
- "Mulligan's Shanty"
- "McCulloch's Chump"
- "Daley's Dorg Wattle"
- "Chinaman Lee's Receipt"
- "Mulga Flat"
- "A Matter of Knack"
- "The M'Camley Mixture"
- "A Snake Yarn"
- "Pullyerleg!"
- "Football"
- "The Guile of Dad McGinnis"
- "All Same"
- "The Spielers and the Girl"
- "The Four O'Clock Baby"
- "The Man Who Always Runs to Catch the Tram"
- "How to Become Immortal"
- "A Bunch of Roses"
- "Advice"
- ""Mulga and Wattle""
- "Only a Moderate Mania"
- "The Way of It"
- "The Little Brown Egotist"
- "The Missing Mean Man"
- "Insomnia"
- "A Tight Place"
- "Finally"

== Critical reception ==
A reviewer in The Truth from Sydney noted: "The little volume of verse, it would be absurd to call it poetry, which he has just published, is destined to be widely popular, for in its pages are contained many quaint conceits and merry quips, such as a people love to read—not for instruction, not for education, but for amusement, for mental recreation. Thus their publication will earn for his name and his writings an even greater share of popularity than he enjoys at present. Whether they will bring him any enduring fame is quite another question, one highly problematical. While he lives and writes, giving us new matter over which to chuckle and laugh, his book will be read and enjoyed."

In The Sydney Morning Herald a writer admired the title and called it "a book in which Mr. W. T. Goodge has gathered together some of the clever and amusing verses in which he has from time to time good-naturedly laughed at sundry men and things. He has a happy knack of seizing the humorous side of everything, and of making his readers laugh with him. He is a complete master of the tools necessary for his work, and rhymes away steadily and merrily as if it was as natural for a man to talk in verse as in prose."

== Publication history ==
After the initial publication of this collection in 1899, it was reprinted in 1904 by the same publisher and then in 1972 by Pollard.

== See also ==
- 1899 in poetry
- 1899 in Australian literature
