= Fidelia Hill =

British poet

Fidelia S. T. Hill
- Born: Fidelia Savage Thornton Munkhouse; 14 August 1794; Pontefract, Yorkshire, England
- Died: 21 July 1854 (aged 59); Launceston, Tasmania, Australia
- Occupation: Poet
- Writing career
- Notable works: Poems and Recollections of the Past (1840)

Fidelia S. T. Hill (14 August 1794 – 21 July 1854) was a British-born Australian poet who is credited as the first woman to have a poetry collection published in Australia.

== Life ==
Hill was born Fidelia Savage Thornton Munkhouse on 14 August 1794 in Pontefract, Yorkshire to Reverend Dr Richard and Fidelia (née Savage) Munkhouse. Following her marriage to Robert Keate Hill of the East India Company in London in 1830, she travelled with her husband to Jamaica where he held a "lucrative position". He was subsequently given the position of harbourmaster in South Australia but the role was filled before he returned to England. He next voyaged per Rapid, the ship that brought William Light, the Surveyor-General of South Australia, to Adelaide. Hill followed on the Buffalo, arriving in December 1836.

1840 saw Hill in Sydney where, having secured subscriptions for more than 200 copies, she published Poems and Recollections of the Past.

After her first husband's death in 1841, Hill married a widower, Henry Howe in Hobart on 7 June 1842. He was a businessman there, but the couple subsequently moved to Launceston where he established himself as an auctioneer.

Hill died in Launceston on 21 July 1854.

== Writing ==
In 1840 more than 200 copies of her Poems and Recollections of the Past were published under subscription in Sydney by T. Trood. The book is recognised as the first poetry collection by a woman to be published in Australia.

Not all the poems in her book were written in Australia. Before leaving England, Hill had written poems which had been well received. One, named "My Brother", came into being while Buffalo was at Rio de Janeiro. Others were written following her arrival in South Australia. In one, she claimed to have been the first white woman in Adelaide.
