= Portia Robinson =

Australian historian (1926–2023)

Portia Robinson AM (née Ferguson; 26 August 1926 – 3 February 2023) was an Australian historian. She was an associate professor at Macquarie University, retiring in 1998. Robinson was appointed a Member of the Order of Australia in 1993 "[f]or service to education, particularly in the field of Australian colonial history".

== Works ==
- Robinson, Portia (1985). The Hatch and Brood of Time: A Study of the First Generation of Native-Born White Australians, 1788–1828. Melbourne: Oxford University Press. ISBN 0-19-554569-9. OCLC 12707557.
- Robinson, Portia (1993). The Women of Botany Bay: A Reinterpretation of the Role of Women in the Origins of Australian Society. Penguin Books. ISBN 0-14-014698-9. OCLC 29359023.
