= Eliza Hamilton Dunlop =

Irish–Australian poet and songwriter (1796 –1880)

- Born: Eliza Hamilton; 1796; County Armagh, Ireland
- Died: 20 June 1880 (aged 83–84); Wollombi, New South Wales
- Resting place: Church of England cemetery in Wollombi
- Occupations: Poet, songwriter
- Spouses: James Sylvius Law (m. 1812); David Dunlop (m. 1823; died 1863)

Eliza Hamilton Dunlop (1796 – 20 June 1880) was an Irish–Australian poet and songwriter, known for composing the poem "The Aboriginal Mother" among others. She was born in County Armagh, Ireland, and was raised by her grandmother and a guardian, after her father travelled to India and her mother died. Later, she travelled to India to visit her father and discovered that she had two Indian half-sisters. Her writing career began in Ireland while she was still a child. After moving to Australia, her works were published in newspapers there, some set to music by Isaac Nathan after he arrived in Australia in 1841.

== Early and personal life ==
Dunlop was born Eliza Hamilton in County Armagh, Ireland, in 1796, and grew up there. Her father was Solomon Hamilton, a lawyer, who raised her Anglican. Her mother died shortly after her birth. Later, her father travelled with her two oldest siblings to Bengal, to become a judge in the Supreme Court of India. Therefore she had to be raised by her grandmother and later by a guardian. Her father sent her money from India; however, she had a difficult time retrieving it.

Her first husband was James Sylvius Law, an astronomer; they married in 1812, when she was 16 years old. The couple had two children, Mary Sophia Georgina born in 1816, and a son. The family moved to Coleraine. In 1820, she went to Kolkata, India, to see her father. She found out there that he had in fact died while she was travelling. She also learned that she had two Indian half-sisters. She was able to receive some financial security by inheriting her father's money as well as from a settlement of George, one of her brothers. Afterwards, she returned to Britain.

She married again in 1823, this time to David Dunlop, a bookseller who was from County Antrim, at the Portpatrick village in Wigtownshire, Dumfries and Galloway, Scotland. Both of them had interest in politics, though in spite of Eliza's enthusiasm for David to pursue a political career, he never managed. They had several children, including a girl who died when she was 8 years old. The couple later moved to Sydney, along with the four children they had by this time, arriving at Port Jackson on 25 February 1838. David was a magistrate briefly in Penrith, New South Wales, appointed by the governor, George Gipps. In 1839, he became a police magistrate in the Wollombi village, as well as an Aborigines protector, where he constructed a stone house. He kept these positions until 1847.

== Writing career ==
She began writing poems as a child; while she was still living in Ireland, and some of her works were published in local magazines, newspapers, journals, and books, such as the Dublin Penny Journal. During her brief visit to India, some of her works were published in a journal there as well.

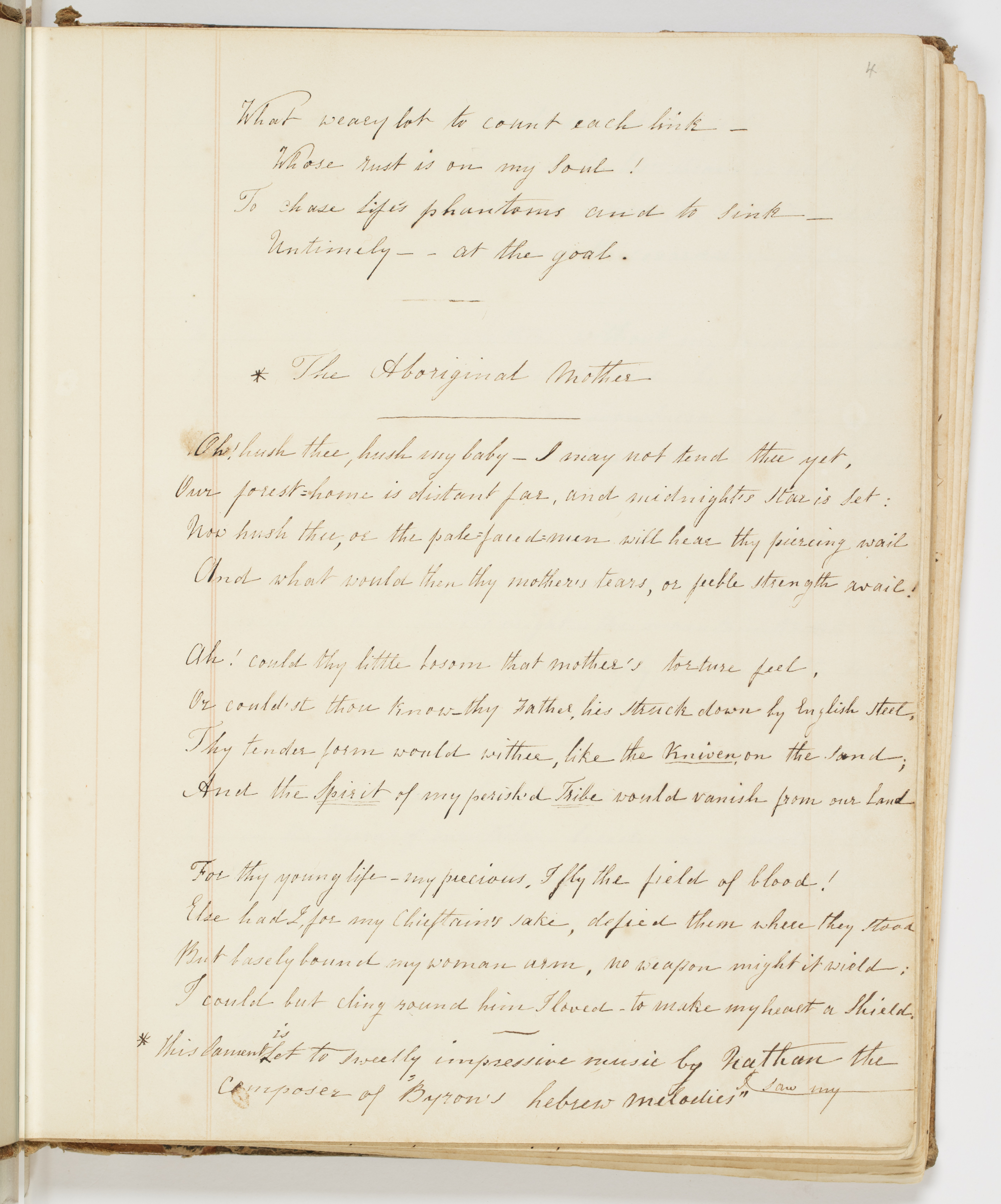
The Aboriginal Mother (Manuscript) From: 'The Vase, comprising songs for music and poems by Eliza Hamilton Dunlop' 1814-1866

After moving to Australia, Dunlop continued writing poems, as well as song lyrics which were given a tune by Isaac Nathan, after he arrived in Sydney in April 1841. Many of her works were published in a variety of newspapers there, including the Maitland Mercury, the Sydney Gazette, and The Australian.

In particular, she wrote the poem "The Aboriginal Mother" in 1838, which she composed due to her opposition to the Myall Creek massacre. It was the fourth poem she had written since she arrived in Australia. The massacre had killed 29 Aboriginal Australians, and occurred just a few months after Dunlop's arrival in Australia. The poem was first published in The Australian on 13 November 1838. The Sydney Herald criticized the poem greatly, causing Dunlop to write a letter to the Herald's editor disapproving of the criticism. Dunlop also collated a selection of poetry in manuscript, entitled: “The Vase”, which includes “The Aboriginal Mother”, held in the Mitchell Library, State Library of NSW.

Dunlop wrote "Nung Ngnun," another poem which became widely published. She was also the writer of "The eagle chief," a romantic poem which was first published on 21 April 1842 in the Sydney Gazette. It is believed that the idea of the poem was inspired by Biraban. In addition, she wrote The Cousins of Aledo, a play based on 'Blanch,' a poem by Mary Russell Mitford; the play is currently in the Mitchell Library. Some of the lyrics Dunlop constructed appeared in Australian Melodies, a series by Isaac Nathan.

Nathan published many songs to Dunlop's lyrics in England, stating "I shall not set a line of my music to any words of the Sydney writers whilst I may calculate on receiving productions from your powerful pen". In addition to her writing, Dunlop helped conserve words aboriginal to Australia, with the help of her daughter, Rachel, and several other members of the family. Following her husband’s appointment as a police magistrate at Wollombi in the Hunter Valley, she engaged the Indigenous Darkinyung, Awabakal and Wonnarua people, learning the languages of the region. Her transcriptions of word lists, songs and poems have survived in manuscript, held in the Mitchell Library, State Library of NSW.

== Later life and death ==
On 24 March 1863, David died at Wollombi, New South Wales. Eliza, however, lived another 17 years, dying on 20 June 1880, at age 84, also in Wollombi. During these 17 years, she wrote less poetry than previously. She is buried at Wollombi's Church of England cemetery. In 1981, long after her death, a collection containing Dunlop's poems was made.

== Works ==
Title	Creator(s)	Year	Publications
The Aboriginal Mother	Eliza Hamilton Dunlop	1838	The Australian (1838), Sydney Monitor and Commercial Advertiser (1841), Australasian Chronicle (1841), The Aboriginal Mother and Other Poems (1981), The Penguin Book of Australian Ballads (1993), The Oxford Book of Australian Women's Verse (1995), Australian Verse: An Oxford Anthology (1998), An Anthology of Australian Poetry to 1920 (2007), The Puncher & Wattmann Anthology of Australian Poetry (2009), Macquarie PEN Anthology of Australian Literature (2009), The Penguin Anthology of Australian Poetry (2009)
The Eagle Chief	Eliza Hamilton Dunlop (writer), Isaac Nathan (composer)	1842	
Mable MacMahon, An Australian Melody	Eliza Hamilton Dunlop (translator), Isaac Nathan (composer)	1842	
The Aboriginal Father	Eliza Hamilton Dunlop (writer), Isaac Nathan (composer)	1843	The Aboriginal Mother and Other Poems (1981), The Turning Wave: Poems and Songs of Irish Australia (2001), An Anthology of Australian Poetry to 1920 (2007), The Penguin Anthology of Australian Poetry (2009)
