= A Coast View =

1857 poem by Australian poet Charles Harpur

- by Charles Harpur
- First published in: The Empire
- Country: Australia
- Language: English
- Publication date: 28 March 1857

Full text
- "A Coast View" at Wikisource

"A Coast View" (1857) is a poem by Australian poet Charles Harpur, also known by the title "Coast Scenery".

It was originally published in The Empire on 28 March 1857 under the title "Coast Scenery", and was subsequently reprinted in the author's single-author collections and a number of Australian poetry anthologies.

In this poem Harpur views a coastal scene with rapture and awe, but also a certain touch of fear and trepidation.

== Critical reception ==
In her essay titled "Imitation and Originality in Australian Colonial Poetry: The Case of Charles Harpur" Leonie Kramer notes: "In poems such as 'A Coast View' or 'The Bush Fire' ... Harpur's originality consists in his thoughtful choice of poetic form ('The Bush Fire', like 'The Creek of the Four Graves' develops an action, but reaches beyond it) and in the way he organizes his poetic language so that it can range from a relatively unadorned narrative style to the heightened diction which always accompanies, though not always with equal force or conviction, his approach to the subject of transcendence or to the wonders and terrors of nature."

== Publication history ==
After the poem's initial publication in The Empire newspaper in 1857 it was reprinted as follows:

- An Anthology of Australian Verse edited by Bertram Stevens, Angus and Robertson, 1907
- The Golden Treasury of Australian Verse edited by Bertram Stevens, Angus and Robertson, 1909
- A Treasury of Colonial Poetry, Currawong, 1982
- The Poetical Works of Charles Harpur edited by Elizabeth Perkins, Angus and Robertson, 1984
- Australian Poetry Since 1788 edited by Geoffrey Lehmann and Robert Gray, University of NSW Press, 2011

== Note ==
- This poem appears in a number of versions from 1857 onwards. For further details, see The Poems of Charles Harpur in Manuscript in the Mitchell Library and in Publication in the Nineteenth Century: An Analytical Finding List by Elizabeth Holt and Elizabeth Perkins (Canberra: Australian Scholarly Editions Centre, 2002).

== See also ==
- 1857 in Australian literature
- 1857 in poetry
