= The Aboriginal Mother =

Poem by Eliza Hamilton Dunlop

- by Eliza Hamilton Dunlop
- Written: 1838
- First published in: The Australian
- Country: Australia
- Language: English
- Subject: Myall Creek massacre
- Rhyme scheme: abcb
- Publication date: 13 December 1838
- Lines: 72

"The Aboriginal Mother" is a poem written by Eliza Hamilton Dunlop, which expresses her lament over the Myall Creek massacre, a mass murder of at least twenty-eight Aboriginal Australians. It was published initially in The Australian on 13 December 1838, several days after seven men were found guilty of the incident but a few days before they were hanged to death. The poem is told in first-person as a mother, whose older child and husband died in the massacre, tries to quiet her baby. It was published in a variety of newspapers and books and after being set to music by Isaac Nathan, it was performed at a concert. The poem was mostly praised by newspapers, but was criticized considerably by the Sydney Herald.

== Background and publication ==
Eliza Hamilton Dunlop moved to New South Wales, Australia in 1838, arriving on 25 February. The Myall Creek Massacre occurred on 10 June 1838, a few months after her arrival. During the incident, at least 28 Aboriginal Australians were murdered by 11 people; several Aboriginal children were decapitated and a three-year-old boy was killed. On 5 December, seven men were found guilty for the crime after a trial; the other four men who were involved with the incident were accused of the massacre but found innocent. On 18 December, the seven men found guilty of the incident were sentenced to death, executed by hanging.

Dunlop's poem was first published in The Australian on 13 December 1838, about a week after the seven men were found guilty, but several days before they were hanged. Afterwards, it appeared in a number of other publications, including The Australasian Chronicle (16 October 1841), The Sydney Monitor and Commercial Advertiser (27 October 1841), The Aboriginal Mother and Other Poems (1981), The Penguin Book of Australian Ballads (1993), The Oxford Book of Australian Women's Verse (1995), Australian Verse: An Oxford Anthology (1998), An Anthology of Australian Poetry to 1920 (2007), The Puncher & Wattmann Anthology of Australian Poetry (2009), Macquarie PEN Anthology of Australian Literature (2009), and The Penguin Anthology of Australian Poetry (2009). Dunlop also collated a selection of poetry in manuscript, entitled: “The Vase”, which includes “The Aboriginal Mother”, held in the Mitchell Library, State Library of NSW. In 1891, a poem "Aboriginal Mother’s Lament" was published in The Daily Examiner. Although the title of the poem was slightly different and the author claimed to be J. C. Laycock, the text of the two poems were almost exactly the same, only having a few minor differences. In addition to these publications, a series of poems by Dunlop called "Songs of an Exile," which contained "The Aboriginal Mother" as its fourth poem, appeared in The Australian in 1838, and 1840.

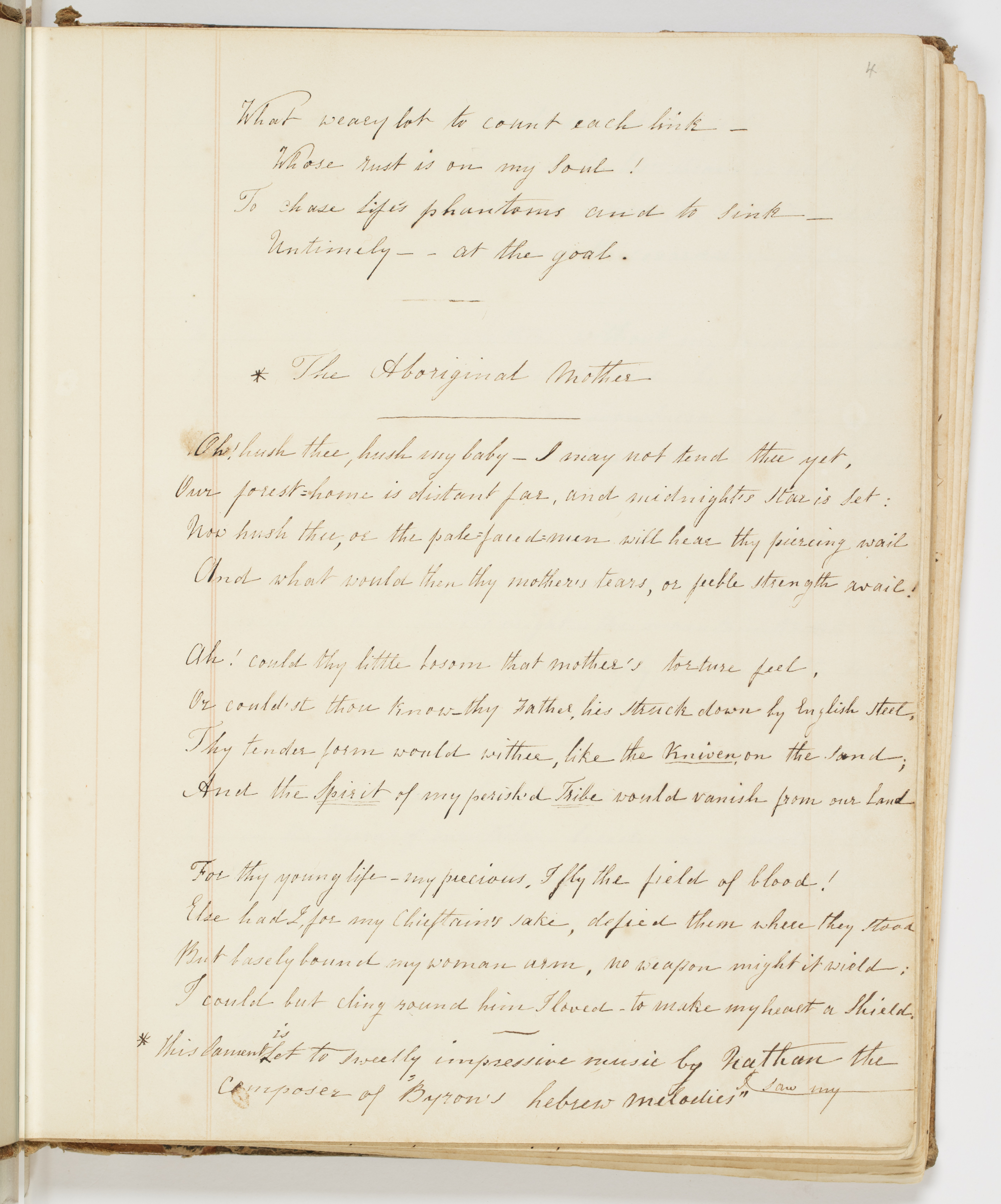
The Aboriginal Mother (Manuscript) From: 'The Vase, comprising songs for music and poems by Eliza Hamilton Dunlop' 1814-1866

== The poem ==
"The Aboriginal Mother" was written to express Dunlop's sorrow over the massacre and expresses sympathy for the Aboriginals of Australia. It is written from the view of a mother who managed to survive the massacre, but whose husband and older child were killed in it. Throughout the poem, she expresses her grief over how she was not able to prevent her husband's death and is trying to quiet down her younger child, a baby. Dunlop's poem took an "immediate, visceral, political, and poetic" approach, addressing the problem of Aboriginals suffering. This style was not what other people and newspapers thought of the massacre. A violent passage in the Sydney Herald told people that if Aboriginal Australians, referred to as the "filthy, brutal cannibals of New Holland" and "ferocious savages", attempt to destroy property or kill someone, "do to them as you would do to any white robbers or murderers — SHOOT THEM DEAD". A passage in The Sydney Monitor and Commercial Advertiser showed a conversation between a "country gentleman" and a "town gentleman", which took place directly after the hanging of the seven murderers. It ended with the country gentleman saying "we are poisoning the Blacks; which is much safer; and serve them right too!"

Dunlop also had another copy of the poem which she kept to herself. This version is "even more revealing", showing the discovery of the dead bodies of the children killed during the event as well as more details about the trials in court. In addition, it shows how a woman and a baby were able to escape and how two other children tried to escape but failed.

The poem is nine stanzas long, with each stanza having eight lines, making a total of 72 lines. The poem follows an ABCB rhyme scheme throughout. The first stanza is composed of the following:

Oh! hush thee — hush my baby,
I may not tend thee yet.
Our forest home is distant far,
And midnight’s star is set.
Now, hush thee — or the pale-faced men
Will hear thy piercing wail,
And what would then thy mother’s tears
Or feeble strength avail!

== Reception ==
The poem has been recounted by scholars as relating to the poems "Indian Woman's Death Song," written by Felicia Hemans in 1828, "The Cherokee Mother," written by Lydia Sigourney in 1831, and other works of the time period described as "crying mother" poems. After the poem was published again in 1841, it was criticized significantly by the Sydney Herald. This caused Dunlop to write a letter to the Sydney Herald's editor, arguing on behalf of the poem and explaining why her views were correct.

After the poem was performed as a song by Rosetta Nathan, it received more press coverage. It was complimented by The Australasian Chronicle, praising the way it was performed. An article in The Australian complimented the way it was sung and the "peculiar degree of pathos", but also mentioned that the performance may have been affected by an absence of confidence. The performance was also covered by the Sydney Gazette, which wrote a substantial article about it with significant praise, saying that "We were in spite of ourselves affected even to tears, and most of our neighbours from a similar state, were prevented observing our weakness." The reviewer of the Sydney Gazette article believed that the song would be popular and frequently performed in concerts, but was also concerned about what people outside of Australia would think of the song and thought that the song contained "misplaced emotions".

Elizabeth Webby later described the poem as "a radical treatment of Aboriginal subjectivity", stating that it was written so that readers would react intensely towards the poem after reading it.

== Song ==
"The Aboriginal Mother" was set to music by Isaac Nathan, an English composer. Although Nathan ended up putting a number of lyrics written by Dunlop to music, "The Aboriginal Mother" was the first. The song was first performed publicly by Rosetta Nathan, Isaac's daughter, in October 1841, during a performance titled "Nathan's Grand Concert." The music was published in Sydney in 1842. The lyrics in the song are different than the original poem in many ways, particularly in the last stanza.
