= Louisa Lawson =

Australian writer and suffragist (1848–1920)

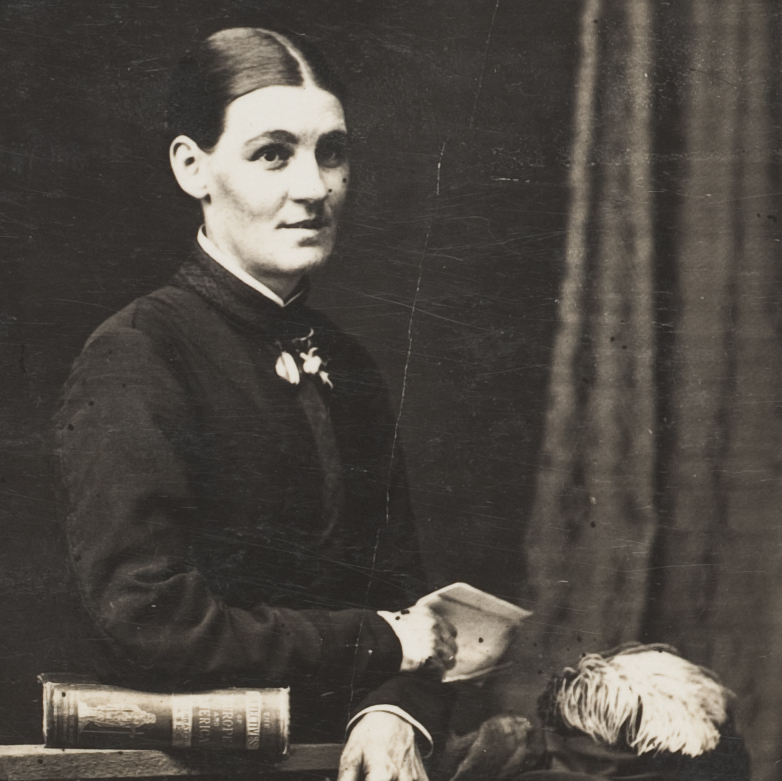
- Portrait of Louisa Lawson
- Born: Louisa Albury; 16 February 1848; Gulgong, New South Wales, Australia
- Died: 12 August 1920 (aged 72); Gladesville, New South Wales, Australia
- Resting place: Rookwood Cemetery
- Education: Mudgee National School
- Spouse: Peter Lawson né Niels Larsen
- Children: Henry Lawson and 4 others

Louisa Lawson (née Albury; 17 February 1848 – 12 August 1920) was an Australian poet, writer, publisher, suffragist, and feminist. Her eldest son was the poet and author Henry Lawson.

== Early life ==
Louisa Albury was born on 17 February 1848 at Guntawang Station near Gulgong, New South Wales, the daughter of Henry Albury and Harriet Winn. She was the second of 12 children in a struggling family, and like many girls at that time left school at 13. On 7 July 1866 aged 18 she married Niels Larsen (Peter Lawson), a Norwegian sailor, at the Methodist parsonage at Mudgee, New South Wales. He was often away gold mining or working with his father-in-law, leaving her on her own to raise four children. Their children were Henry (b. 1867), Charles (b. 1869), Peter (b. 1873), and twins Gertrude and Annette (b. 1877). Annette died at eight months. Louisa grieved over the loss of Annette for many years and left the care of her other children to the oldest child, Henry. This led to ill feelings on Henry's part towards his mother and the two often fought. In 1882 she, her children, and their Border Collie named Bryn moved to Sydney, where she managed boarding houses.

== Publisher ==
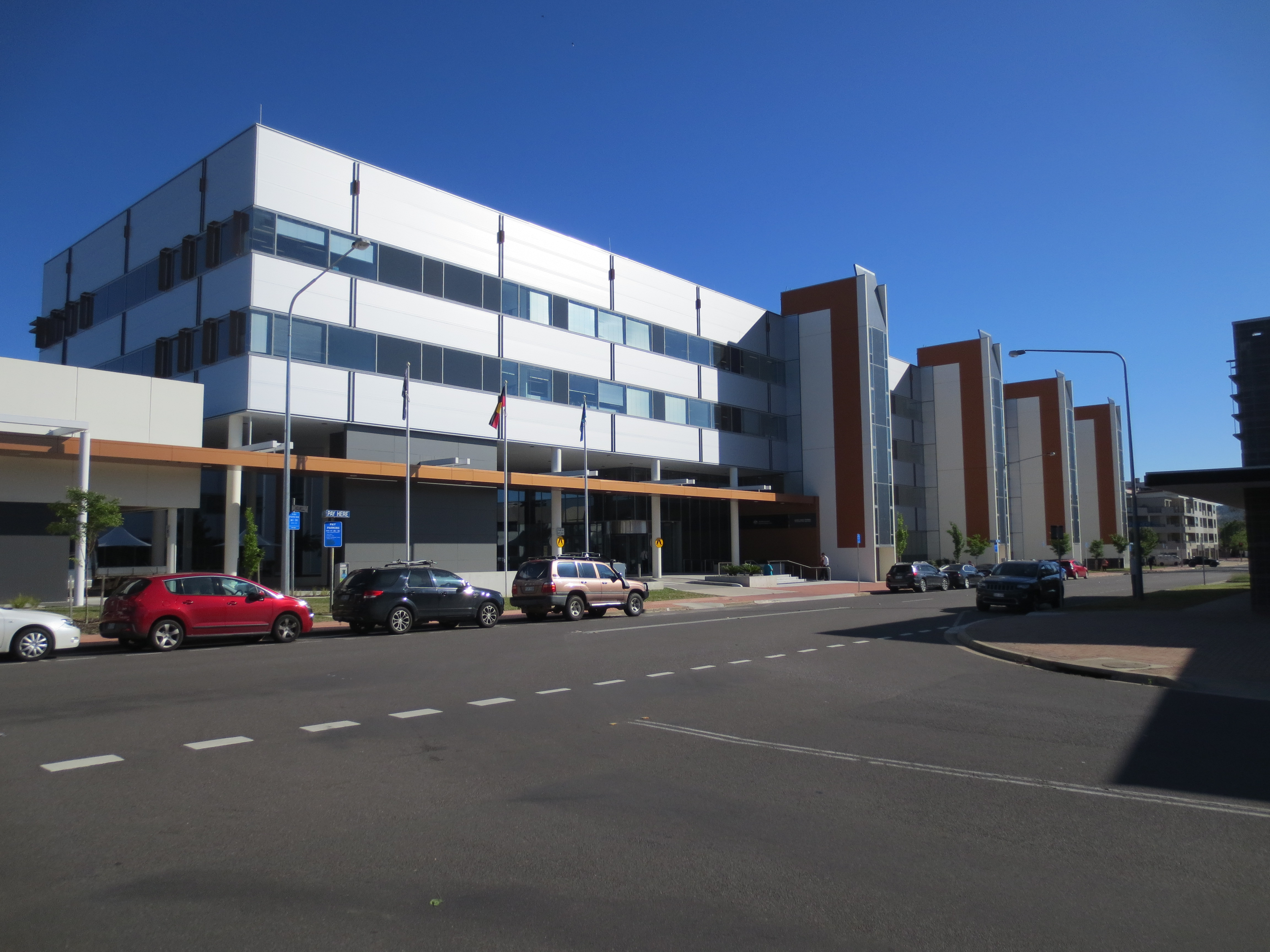
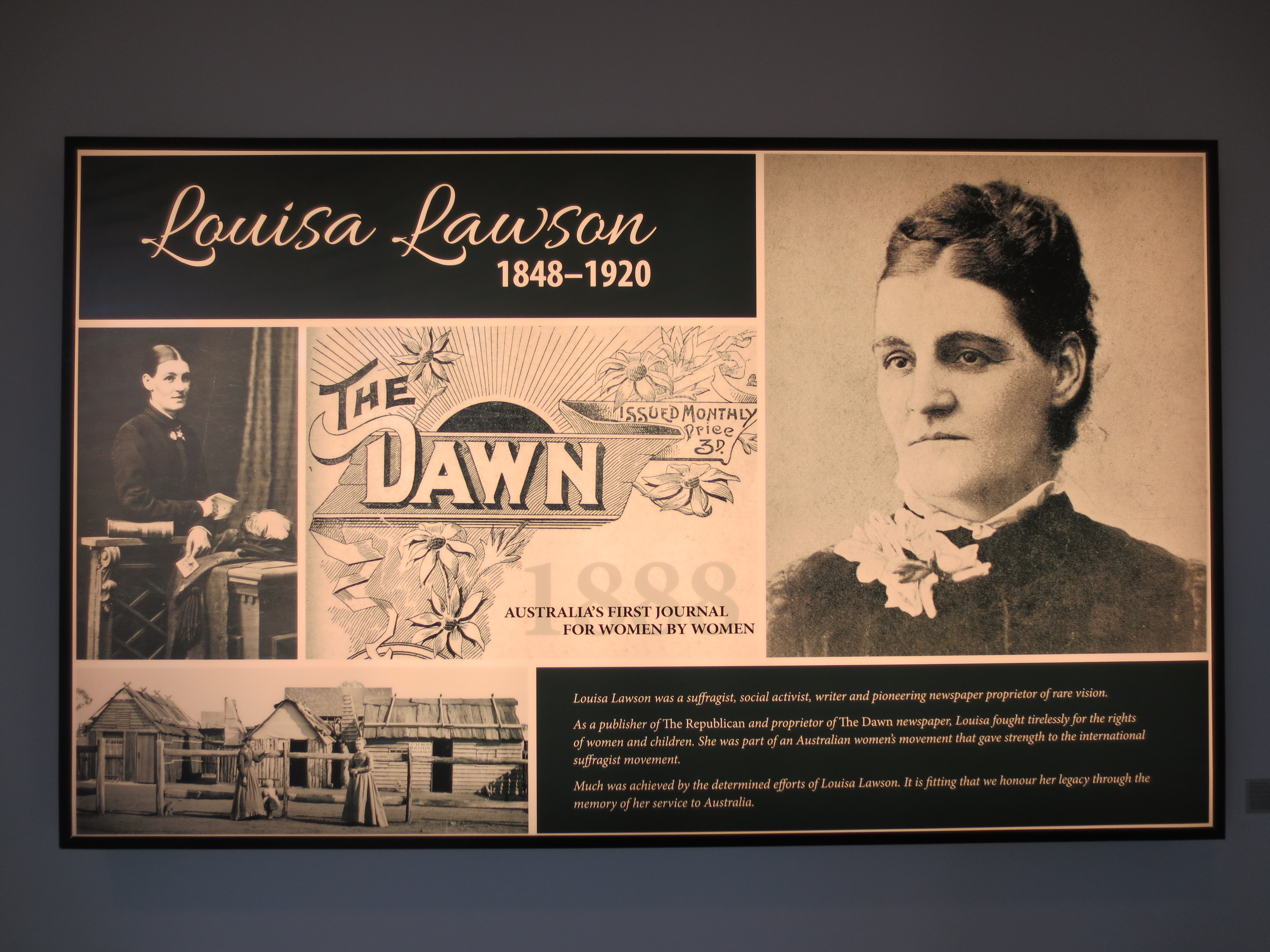
Louisa Lawson Building in Greenway, Canberra and memorial plaque inside.

Lawson used the money saved while running her boarding houses to purchase shares in the radical pro-federation newspaper The Republican in 1887. She and son Henry edited The Republican in 1887–88, which was printed on an old press in Louisa's cottage. The Republican called for an Australian republic uniting under 'the flag of a Federated Australia, the Great Republic of the Southern Seas'. The Republican was replaced by The Nationalist, but it lasted two issues.

With her earnings and her experience from working on The Republican, Lawson was able, in May 1888, to edit and publish The Dawn, Australia's first journal produced solely by women, which was distributed throughout Australia and overseas. The Dawn had a strong feminist perspective and frequently addressed issues such as women's right to vote and assume public office, women's education, and economic and legal rights, domestic violence, and temperance. It is considered an important precursor to the women in print movement, when second-wave feminists established alternative communication networks by creating publications that were written, edited, printed, distributed, and read by women.

The Dawn was published monthly from its debut to 1905 and at its height employed 10 female staff. Lawson's son Henry also contributed poems and stories for the paper, and in 1894 The Dawn press printed Henry's first book, Short Stories in Prose and Verse.

Around 1904, Louisa published her own volume, Dert and Do, a simple story of 18,000 words. In 1905, she collected and published her own verses, The Lonely Crossing and other Poems. Louisa likely had a strong influence on her son's literary work in its earliest days.

== Suffragist ==
In 1889, Lawson founded The Dawn Club, which became the hub of the suffrage movement in Sydney. In 1891 the Womanhood Suffrage League of New South Wales formed to campaign for women's suffrage, and Lawson allowed the League to use The Dawn office to print pamphlets and literature free of charge. When women were finally given the vote, in 1902 with the passing of the New South Wales Womanhood Suffrage Bill, Lawson was introduced to the members of Parliament as "The Mother of Suffrage in New South Wales".

== Later life ==
Lawson retired in 1905 but continued to write for Sydney magazines and published The Lonely Crossing and Other Poems, a collection of 53 poems. She died on Thursday 12 August 1920, aged 72, after a long and painful illness in Gladesville Mental Hospital. On Saturday 14 August 1920, she was buried with her parents in the Church of England section of Rookwood Cemetery.

== Memorials ==
In 1941, The Sydney Morning Herald reported a memorial seat was to be erected in The Domain, Sydney as a tribute to Louisa Lawson.

In 1975 Australia Post released a stamp in honour of Louisa. The stamp was designed by Des and Jackie O'Brien, and was one in a series of six stamps released on 6 August 1975 to commemorate the International Year of Women. It was printed at the Melbourne Note Printing Branch, using the photogravure process in three colours.

The Louisa Lawson House, a mental healthcare centre for women which operated from 1982 to 1994, was named in her honour.

Lawson was posthumously inducted onto the Victorian Honour Roll of Women in 2001.

A park in Marrickville, New South Wales is named in her honour. The Louisa Lawson Reserve also contains a large colourful mosaic depicting the front cover of The Dawn, and a plaque that reads "Louisa Lawson (1848–1920) Social Reformer, Writer, Feminist and Mother of Henry Lawson. These stones are all that remain from the walls of her home in Renwick Street, Marrickville."

Louisa Lawson Crescent, in the Canberra suburb of Gilmore, is named in her honour.

Louisa Lawson Building, in the Canberra suburb of Greenway, is named in her honour. This building is currently occupied by Services Australia.

A statue of Louisa Lawson was unveiled outside the Library in Market St, Mudgee on 8 March 2023.

In July 2025, a blue plaque was unveiled in her honour by New South Wales government, sited on the Old Eurunderee Post Office on Henry Lawson Drive outside Mudgee.

== Selected single poems ==
- "To a Bird" (1888)
- "A Dream" (1891)
- "A Birthday Wish" (1892)
- "To a Bird" (1892)
- "To My Sister" (1893)
- "Lines Written During a Night Spent in a Bush Inn" (1901)
- "The Digger's Daughter" (1903)
- "The Hour is Come" (1903)
- "Back Again" (1904)
- "In Memoriam" (1905)
- "A Child's Question" (1905)
- "A Mother's Answer" (1905)
