= W. T. Goodge =

English writer and journalist (1862–1909)

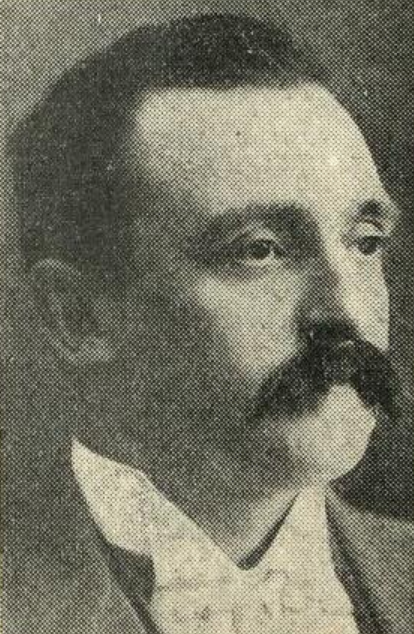
- Born: William Thomas Goodge; 28 September 1862; Middlesex, England
- Died: 28 November 1909 (aged 47); North Sydney, New South Wales, Australia
- Occupations: novelist, short story writer, poet, and journalist

William Thomas Goodge (28 September 1862 – 28 November 1909) was an English writer and journalist, who arrived in Australia in 1882, after jumping ship in Sydney. He worked in various jobs in New South Wales, including as a coal-miner, until he was engaged to write for The Tribune in North Sydney, a small weekly associated with the Daily Telegraph. From there he was chosen by Harry Newman (Member of Parliament and newspaper proprietor) to edit The Leader newspaper in Orange, New South Wales. Goodge remained in Orange, becoming part-owner of The Leader at some point, until in the early 1900s he returned to Sydney and began writing for that city's newspapers, especially The Sunday Times.

Goodge was first married on 21 January 1892. His wife died 3 January 1895 of typhoid, leaving behind two children. Sometime later he remarried and had another child. Goodge died on 28 November 1909 in North Sydney.

During his writing career, Goodge wrote mainly light-verse poems and short stories. Although he did have one novel, The Fortunes of Fenchurch, serialised in the pages of The Sunday Times, the book was never published separately. His best known works were "The Great Australian Adjective", and "The Oozlum Bird".

Norman Lindsay, who illustrated the reprint volume of Goodge's only poetry collection, considered the poet better than C. J. Dennis. "Goodge, with his Hits! Skits! and Jingles!, is a much better light-verse writer than Dennis, and his book should be reprinted."

== Novels ==
- The Fortunes of Fenchurch, 1906

== Collections ==
- Hits! Skits! and Jingles!, 1899

=== Selected list of poems ===
Title	Year	First published	Reprinted/collected in
"The Great Australian Adjective"	1897	The Bulletin, 11 December 1897	Hits! Skits! and Jingles!, Bulletin, 1899, p. 115

Others

- "The Oozlum Bird" (1897)
- "Daley's Dorg Wattle" (1898)
- "Mulligan's Shanty" (1898)
- "How We Drove the Trotter" (1899)
