= Ellen Davitt =

English-born Australian writer

- Born: 1812; Kingston upon Hull, Yorkshire
- Died: 6 January 1879 (aged 66–67); Fitzroy, Victoria
- Writing career
- Language: English
- Notable works: Force and Fraud : A Tale of the Bush

Ellen Davitt (1812-1879) was an English-born Australian writer.

== Biography ==
Marie Antoinette Hélène Léontine (Ellen) Heseltine was born in Kingston upon Hull, Yorkshire in 1812.

She married Arthur Davitt, an educationalist, in Jersey in 1845. The couple arrived in Australia on 31 July 1854 with the aim of opening a new Model School. However, internal disagreements and a financial recession resulted in the discharge of the Davitts in 1859. The husband contracted tuberculosis and died in 1860. Davitt continued to teach and also began writing after his death. Davitt was a sister-in-law of English writer Anthony Trollope, but appears to have had little contact with him.

Although some of her early work has been lost she is now credited with having written the first Australian murder mystery with her novel Force and Fraud : A Tale of the Bush in 1865. Davitt began teaching again in 1874 but she died in extreme poverty in Fitzroy, in 1879.

== Legacy ==
Australia's crime writing award for women, the Davitt Award, is named in her honour.

== Selected works ==
- Force and Fraud : A Tale of the Bush (1865)
- Uncle Vincent : Or, Love and Hatred (1866)
