= Arthur J. Rees =

Australian writer

Arthur John Rees (1872–29 November 1942), was an Australian-born journalist and mystery writer.

Born in St Kilda, Melbourne, he married Mary Mane Gilbert in Ballarat in 1901. He was for a short time on the staff of the Melbourne Age before moving to New Zealand, where he joined the staff of the New Zealand Herald. In April 1910 he was appointed editor of the NZ Truth, but returned to Australia in August 1910. He then moved to England, where he worked for The Times.

His first novel, The Merry Marauders, was set in New Zealand. This was followed by The Hampstead Mystery, in collaboration with Australian mystery writer John Reay Watson. By the time of his fifth novel, he had relocated permanently to England, where he lived in Worthing, Sussex. He was a friend of writer Thomas Hardy and one of the founders of PEN International. He focused on writing detective fiction, with a strong element of local folklore. His proficiency as a writer of crime-mystery stories is attested by Dorothy Sayers in the introduction to Great Short Stories of Detection, Mystery and Horror, 1928. Two of his stories were included in an American world-anthology of detective stories. Some of his works were translated into French and German.

He returned to Australia briefly in 1935 for health reasons, where he criticised Australia's censorship regime. While in Australia his wife divorced him for desertion. He resumed journalistic work for the Melbourne Herald, with a series of articles on "authors I have known"; he continued to contribute articles to the Melbourne Herald from London until his death in 1942.

== Bibliography ==
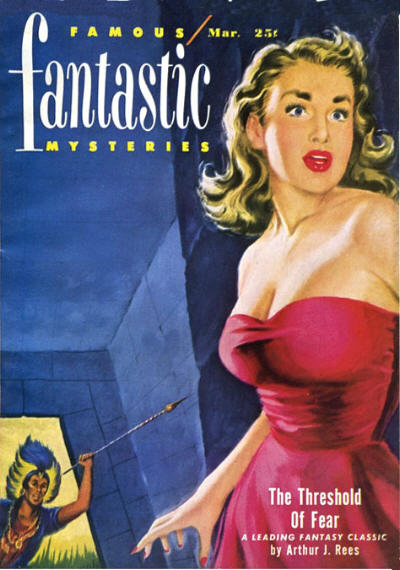
Rees's 1925 novel The Threshold of Fear was reprinted in the March 1951 issue of Famous Fantastic Mysteries

Inspector Crewe novels

- The Hampstead Mystery (1916) [with John Reay Watson]
- The Mystery of the Downs (1918) [with John Reay Watson]

Grant Colwyn novels

- The Shrieking Pit (1919)
- The Hand in the Dark (1920)

Colwin Grey novels

- The Threshold of Fear (1925)
- Simon of Hangletree (1926)
- Greymarsh (1927)
- The Investigations of Colwin Grey (1932)

Chief Inspector Luckraft novels

- The Island of Destiny (1923)
- Simon of Hangletree (1926)
- The Pavilion by the Lake (1930)
- The Tragedy of Twelvetrees (1931)
- The River Mystery (1932)
- Aldringham's Last Chance (1933)
- The Single Clue (1940)

Others

- The Merry Marauders (1913)
- The Moon Rock (1922)
- The Cup of Silence (1924)
- Love Me Anise (1928)
- Old Sussex and Her Diarists (1929)
- The Brink (1931)
- Peak House (1933)
- The Flying Argosy (1934)
