= John Lang (writer) =

Australian lawyer and novelist (1816–1864)

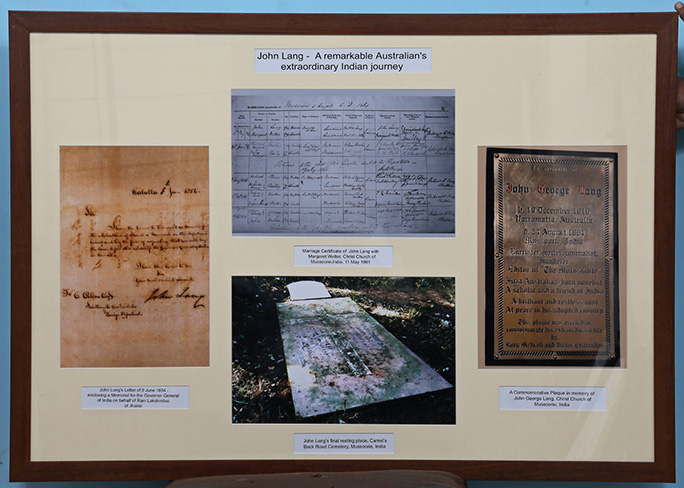
A photo collage dedicated to the memory of John Lang, given by Indian Prime Minister Narendra Modi to Australian Prime Minister Tony Abbott in 2014

John Lang (19 December 1816 – 20 August 1864) was an Australian lawyer and was Australia's first native born novelist, who studied law in England and returned to Australia in 1837 as barrister, and permanently migrated to India in 1842 where he established successful newspapers and also had a successful career as the writer and barrister with high-profile clients such as the Lakshmibai - the Rani of Jhansi. He died in India and is buried in India at Mussoorie's Camel's Back Cemetery.

== Early life and education ==
Lang was born at Parramatta, Sydney, Australia, second and posthumous son of Walter Lang, merchant adventurer, and his wife Elizabeth, née Harris.

Lang was educated at Sydney College under William Timothy Cape. He went to Cambridge in March 1837 returned to Australia after qualifying as a barrister.

== Career ==
=== In India ===
==== As barrister ====
A few months later he permanently migrated to India in 1842 and worked as a barrister. He took on high-profile clients such as the Rani of Jhansi in her battles against the British East India Company.

==== As journalist and writer ====
John lang was known to have written various books like - Wanderings in India, and Other Sketches of Life in Hindostan. which is a collection of his popular journalistic sketches first serialized in Charles Dickens' Household Words and later compiled as a book.

He was also Editor-Founder of "The Mofussilite", a newspaper, which often took a critical line against the East India Company.

== Death ==
Lang died in the hill station of Mussoorie, India, and is buried in Camel's Back Cemetery, which enjoys a wide vista of the Lower Western Himalaya, which Lang loved greatly. His grave had been lost for almost a century until it was sought out and discovered by the writer Ruskin Bond.
