= Kate Baker =

Australian teacher and literary guardian of Australian author Joseph Furphy's works

Kate Baker OBE
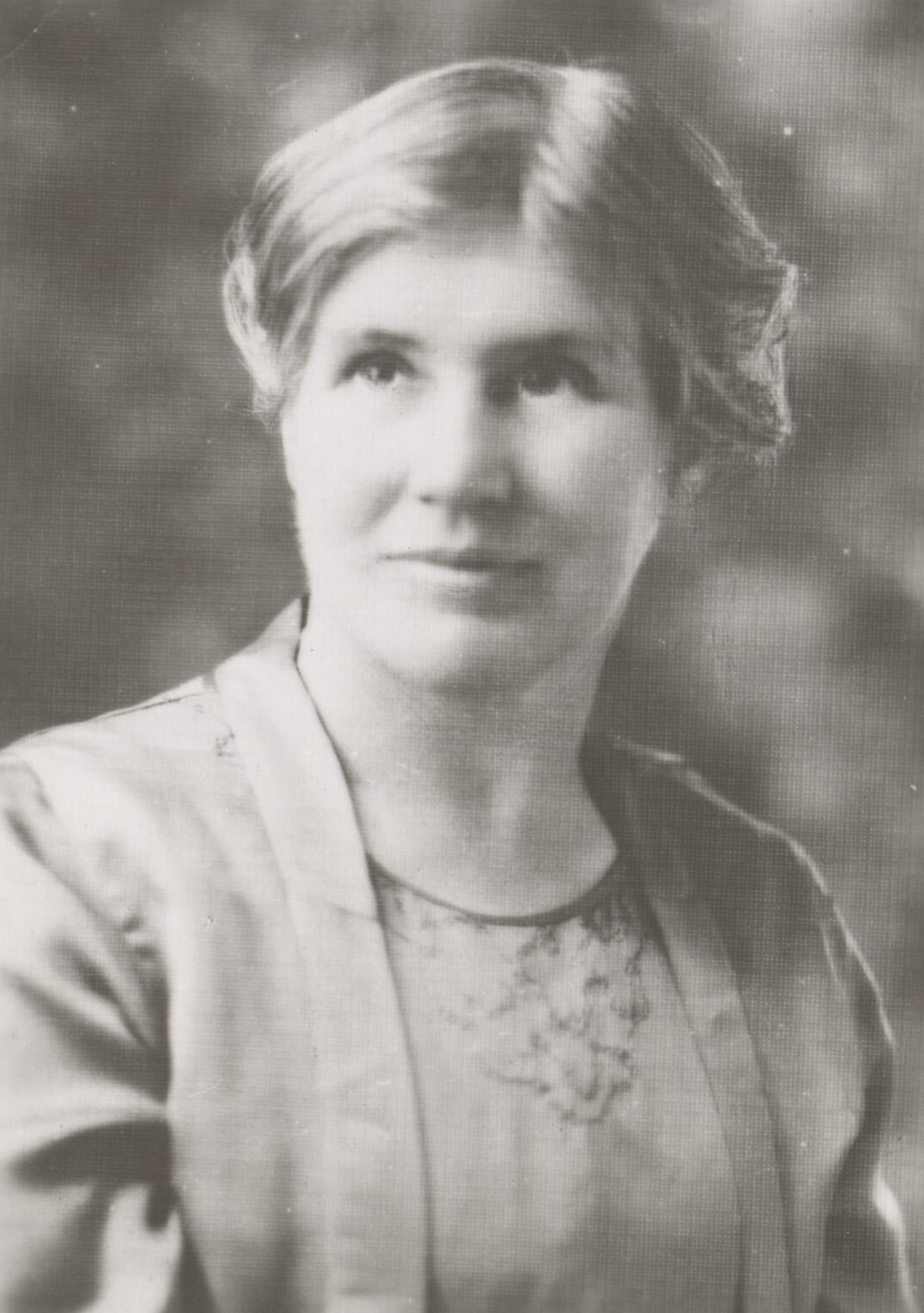
- Born: Catherine Baker; 23 April 1861; Cappoquin, County Waterford, Ireland
- Died: 7 September 1953 (aged 92); Camberwell, Victoria, Australia
- Resting place: Springvale Botanical Cemetery
- Occupation: Teacher
- Known for: Championing the work of writer Joseph Furphy; Services to Australian literature

Catherine Baker OBE (23 April 1861 – 7 September 1953) was an Irish-born Australian teacher best known for championing the work of her friend Joseph Furphy, whose novel Such Is Life had received an indifferent reception upon its initial publication in 1909 but was later embraced by critics and the public. Miles Franklin incorporated Baker's recollections into the essay "Who Was Joseph Furphy?", which won the S. H. Prior Memorial Prize in 1939. Baker was appointed an OBE in 1937 for her efforts in promoting Furphy's work and to broader Australian literature. She was an influential part of the Australian literary scene, supporting, writing to and encouraging writers such as Ada Cambridge, Victor Kennedy, Edith Coleman, the poet Marie E. J. Pitt, journalist Alice Henry and the poet John Shaw Neilson. She was made a life member of the Henry Lawson Society, and honoured with a bronze plaque by the society in 1936. Shortly before her death in 1953 she was made vice-president of the Australian Council for Civil Liberties.

== Early life and career ==
Baker was born on 23 April 1861 in Cappoquin, Ireland, to Catherine Baker (née Sheffield) and Francis Wilson Baker, a heraldic painter. Her father died when Baker was only 3 months old, and the family subsequently moved to Williamstown, Victoria, in 1870 to live with Catherine's sister, who was the wife of the then mayor, Edward Crane. Baker attended Williamstown North State school, and in 1881 she became a teacher at Hyde Street State school in Footscray. Later, in 1886 she taught at a school at Wanalta Creek near Rushworth.

== Meeting and correspondence with Joseph Furphy ==
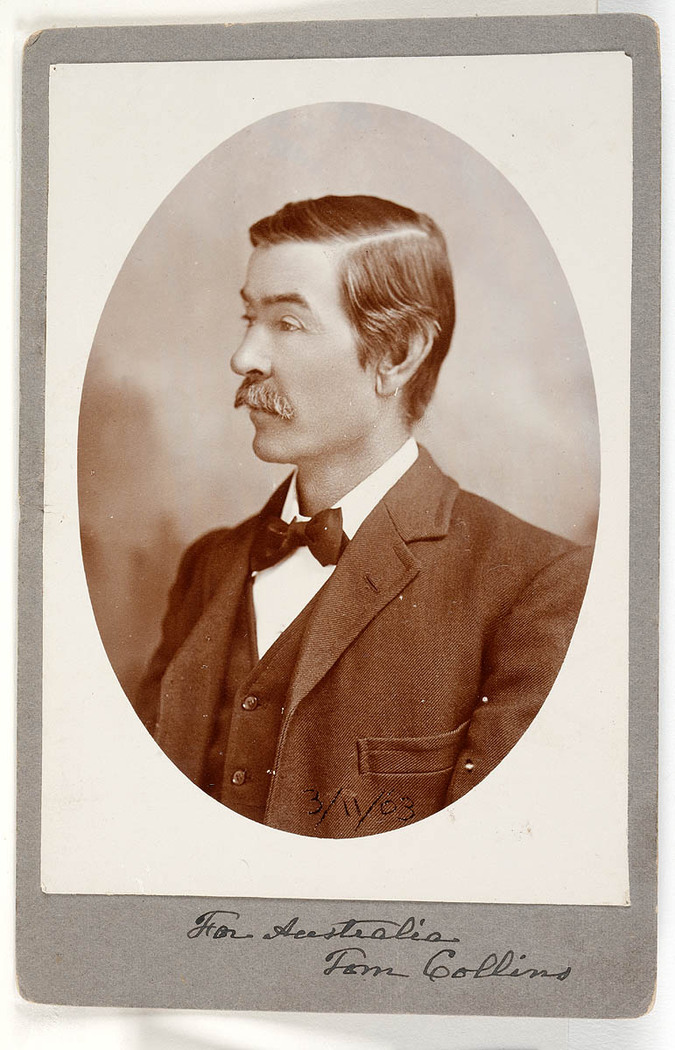
Joseph Furphy wrote under the pen-name "Tom Collins"

Whilst teaching at Wanalta school she boarded at the home of the parents of pupil Isaac Furphy, before the next year moving to board with the parents of Joseph Furphy in Burramboot East. Before leaving her lodgings to move to Melbourne, Baker was delayed for three days due to weather. Joseph Furphy, who had been working outdoors, returned home for several days, and the two met. The encounter made a lasting impression on Baker, who later recalled to reporter J. K. Ewers that Furphy "had much the same style in speaking as in writing, discursive, breaking into side issues, but ever returning to the main topic", and that "at the time of meeting him I compared him in my mind to the gentle scholar in Longfellow's Tales of a Wayside Inn. Later, knowing him more perfectly, I likened him to Leonardo da Vinci...".

After moving back to Melbourne to teach at her old school in North Williamstown Baker began a correspondence with him, encouraging him to write a book about his life. Furphy valued Baker's input and encouragement; biographer John Barnes described Baker as "providing the intellectual companionship [Furphy] had never known with his wife", from whom he was estranged. Baker became friends with Joseph's sister Annie, and through this relationship Baker invited Joseph to visit her, which he did around 1887. Despite the presence of Annie, the relationship between Baker and Furphy caused suspicions within his family, and Joseph's brother John effectively prevented Furphy from visiting Baker the following year.

Furphy and Baker's remained in frequent correspondence, and at some point he resumed annual visits to Melbourne to see them until the end of 1903 when he moved across the country to Swanbourne, near in Perth. Baker had been teaching at her old school in North Williamstown from 1887 to 1898, after which she continued as an infants teacher.

== Publication of Such Is Life ==
In 1889, after much encouragement by Baker and his friend and fellow blacksmith, William Cathels, Furphy submitted his work Such Is Life to The Bulletin under the pseudonym Tom Collins. The hand-written manuscript submitted was 1,200 pages (which would have been about 550 printed pages) and, despite a positive review, literary editor A. G. Stephens determined it could not be published due to its length. An abridged version was published in 1903 to disappointing sales, but a section that had been excised enjoyed greater success serialised in the Barrier Truth between 1905 and 1907 under the title Rigby's Romance.

== Furphy's standard bearer ==
After Furphy died in 1912, Baker had a nervous breakdown and retired from the then Victorian Department of Education. In 1913 she collected and published The Poems of Joseph Furphy via the Lothian Book Publishing Company, financing the publication from her own funds. In 1914, after part the original edition of Such Is Life was found at The Bulletin under some lumber, she purchased the remaining 825 unbound copies of the novel for £60 and began arranging to have it republished by The Specialty Press as a second edition with a preface by Vance Palmer.

Between 1915 and 1918, Baker recommenced teaching at a number of country schools and would occasionally tutor students, despite an accelerated loss of hearing. In 1917, the second edition, re-edited by noted writer Vance Palmer, was released. Like the first edition, the second met with lackluster sales, possibly due to bookseller Angus & Robertson's declined of distribution rights. A review in The Socialist by William John Miles appearing some five years after the edition's release was pointed about the lack of publicity around the work. Palmer responded to Miles's criticisms in an open letter, which he concluded by noting that "probably Joseph Furphy's work would have been left for some antiquarian in the Mitchell Library to unearth if it had not been for the enlightened energy of Miss Kate Baker" and that "not all writers are lucky enough to have such a devoted friend to act as their literary trustee."

By 1921 Baker had located and purchased Rigby's Romance in the files of the Barrier Truth and entered it into the C. J. De Garis Publishing House's Australian Novel Competition, who awarded it an Honourable Mention, and decided to publish it. The edition came with an introduction from A. G. Stevens, who had originally positively reviewed but declined to publish Such Is Life until the section that formed Rigby’s Romance was excised. In his introduction, he described Baker as "Furphy's standard-bearer". Miles Franklin later requoted the phrase, adding the word "gallant".

In November 1929, J. K. Ewers wrote a series of articles about Australian authors entitled "Pioneers of the Pen", his piece on Furphy reached Baker and she struck up a correspondence with him. With Ewers she found a powerful ally, and in his autobiography Long Enough for a Joke he admits he became "willingly the slave of Kate Baker in the service of Joseph Furphy" In 1931 Baker campaigned to establish a plaque on the site of the house where Furphy grew up, which was by then the Yarra Glen primary school. Her campaign was successful and in 1934 the plaque was unveiled at a ceremony accompanied by Furphy's sister Annie Stewart and a number of dignitaries, including the Speaker of the Victorian Legislative Assembly, William Hugh Everard. Baker also donated a blackwood cabinet containing Furphy's works and various tributes and messages.

The 1937 publication of an abridged version of Such Is Life was met with outrage in Australia. Miles Franklin wrote that "the cover is a nice blue, the dust jacket in mourning hue ― appropriately, I feel."

In March 1937 an abridged version of Such as Life was published in London by Jonathan Cape, and almost immediately met with a storm of criticism in Australia. Vance Palmer had agreed to edit the novel, however—though his name was prominent on the cover of the work-it was in fact edited largely by his wife Nettie Palmer assisted by their daughter Aileen. The most vociferous critic was P. R. "Inky" Stephenson, who wrote that "this edition howls to heaven to be withdrawn. It must be flung into the discard, and Vance Palmer with it, unless he publicly admits the enormity of his blunder". Miles Franklin was no less cutting, writing in The Bulletin that "the cover is a nice blue, the dust jacket in mourning hue ― appropriately, I feel". Amongst her criticisms was the removal of the ironic use of parentheticals whenever a swear-word was mentioned, which was a comic technique used by Furphy that poked fun at the censors of the time; the removal of references easily understood by Australians but which might not have been clear to an English audience; and what seemed a lack of understanding of Australian humour of the time, heavily used in Furphy's work. She wrote that "if such 'editing' of this nobly indigenous work was the only way to gain English attention for it, then our very feeble stature as colonial writers is painfully exposed."

This placed Baker in an awkward position. She had approved, as literary executor, the abridged version. Baker had known that it would be difficult to have the work published as she had already attempted to have Such Is Life published by Australian publisher Angus & Robertson, but this had failed. She found interest from English publisher Jonathan Cape however, and after discussions she agreed to allow Vance Palmer to abridge the novel. In a telegram to Cape, she wrote that she was confident it would allow the work to "stand out as an Australian classic [Kate Baker's emphasis]', and that '[Palmer's] cutting will neither emasculate the work nor devitalize it". She found, however, that the abridgement was not what she had expected. Despite her friendship with the Palmers, she wrote to The Bulletin on 9 June 1937 that she had told the publishers that "I am pleased with the book's format ― its paper, the printing, the binding; the editor has certainly kept the continuity of the story, and has written a plain, unvarnished tale that will no doubt be pleasing to the British public; but it is not Joseph Furphy's Such Is Life." She further wrote that "I hope the book will sell well in England. I fear Australian connoisseurs will resent it fiercely."

== Further contributions to Australian literature ==
Portrait relief in bronze of Kate Baker OBE which was presented to her on 14 December 1936

Baker was highly regarded by many notable figures in Australian literature, and regularly wrote to Australian authors. She counted as her long time friend Robert Samuel Ross, lamenting his death after an unbroken friendship of 30 years in a letter to the Labor Call. Her autograph book, now held in the manuscripts section of the State Library of Victoria, includes signatures from many notable authors of the day, including Bernard O'Dowd, Marie Pitt, Frank Dalby Davison, Edward Harrington, Mary Gilmore, and Bertha Lawson (the widow of Henry Lawson). She wrote extensively to many Australian authors – in 1931, for instance, she wrote to Arthur Upfield expressing her appreciation for his novel The Beach of Atonement. A collection of her letters is currently held at the National Library of Australia and includes letters to J. S. Neilson, Guy Innes, Vance and Nettie Palmer, Miles Franklin and J. K. Ewers. J. S. Neilson met Baker in 1929 and credited Baker as introducing him to many Melbourne writers. In their coronation biographies for OBE recipients, The West Australian credited her with being "largely responsible for the publication of [his] poems".

When Baker was young she had frequented the Williamstown Mechanic's Institute, which served as the local library. She often shared this space with Ada Cross, better known as Ada Cambridge. Baker later agitated for a memorial to Cambridge, and in 1946 a plaque, erected in the foyer of Williamstown Town Hall by the Lindsay Gordon Lover's Society, was unveiled by president of the Bread and Cheese Club, J. K. Moir. When Baker wrote a series of biographical notes, which she later donated to the National Library of Australia, she included a history of Cambridge's life. This included an observation that Cambridge's maid was unwilling to leave in order to be married, which literary critic Roy Duncan has obliquely noted seemed "completely unmindful that there may have been other reasons for this than loyalty to a mistress [which revealed] something of [Baker's] own personality".

Baker was a member of the Henry Lawson Society. In 1932 she gave a lecture on the works of poet Hubert Church. She was held in high esteem by the members and in September 1939 she was presented with life membership for her services to the Society and Australian literature. The Society later commissioned a bronze plaque of Baker by sculptor Wallace Anderson, which was presented to her by Bernard O'Dowd and placed on exhibition in the shop-front of Robertson and Mullens' in Elizabeth Street, Melbourne. Such was her influence in the literature world at that time that James Booth and the Australian Literary Society lobbied for her to be honoured by the King and in 1937 she was appointed an OBE for her contributions to Australian literature.

== Miles Franklin collaboration ==
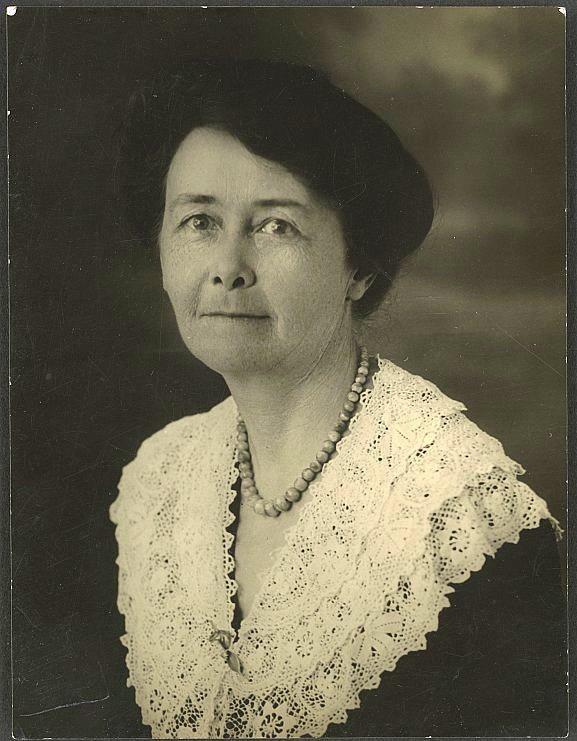
Miles Franklin had a tense collaboration with Kate Baker over a biography of Joseph Furphy

Miles Franklin had been corresponding with Baker since the mid-1930s, badgering her to write a biography of Furphy. Baker eventually agreed to work on the biography with Franklin and in late 1938 she travelled to Sydney to live with Franklin for the duration of their collaboration. The two women worked together for five months and in June 1939 submitted the manuscript "Who Was Joseph Furphy" to The Bulletin. The two evidently found working together challenging. Baker wrote to Victor Kennedy that she felt she had suffered "a touch of purgatory, whose cleansing fires burn out every touch of self-conceit and vanity". Franklin also found Baker to be trying, not least because by this point Baker was growing increasingly deaf – on 13 February 1939 she wrote in her diary "Hot day. The fatigue of trying to get K.B. [Kate Baker] to hear is killing. She has no idea of literary procedure or construction and one can't yell a notion into her deafness." Franklin, who had a more prosaic view of Furphy than Baker – who refused to see his imperfections – wrote to J. K. Moir that Baker had the "illusion that she created Furphy", and that she "lives and breathes and thinks only of Furphy... he is her monomania".

After the work had been submitted to The Bulletin it won the S. H. Prior Memorial Prize in August of the same year. When Baker moved back to Melbourne, she wrote of having felt she had been "stabbed" and insufficiently acknowledged by Franklin. In spite of this, Baker believed it was more important that it furthered Furphy's cause and so swallowed her pride. When Franklin was given a Commonwealth Literary Fund (CLF) grant, Baker continued to check primary manuscripts to allow Franklin to write the 1944 biography Joseph Furphy: the Legend of a Man and His Book, the same year as an unabridged version of This is Life was released. Franklin acknowledged Baker's contribution as she ensured that the biography was credited as being authored "in association with Kate Baker". Franklin, for her part, showed she had a lot of affection for Baker in spite of their past differences, later writing that Baker was "a triumph, 91 next month, and still going about by herself and tripping down steps in a half light without holding the side rail – looks so nice too".

== Later life ==
In later life Baker remained active in the Australian literary scene. In 1942 she presented to the Australian National Library an unpublished manuscript of biographical essays entitled Silhouettes on notable figures of Australian literature. These included the novelist Ada Cambridge, Victor Kennedy, Edith Coleman, the poet Marie E. J. Pitt, Joseph Furphy, journalist Alice Henry and the poet John Shaw Neilson. Her heavy involvement in the Australian literary world is perhaps best shown through a letter she sent to Victor Kennedy in 1945, where she referred to a variety of societies she had contributed to, including the "ALS, Lawson [Henry Lawson Society], Gordon [Lindsay Gordon Society], APLS, and the PEN and the Bread and Cheese", with the suggestion they form a remembrance monument to "writers who have passed on". Her efforts eventually led to the formation, in 1947, of the Australian Literature Commemorative Association. In 1951 she presented a collection of writings and photographs of Furphy to the La Trobe Library.

Baker died on 7 October 1953 at Camberwell private hospital, aged 92. Her funeral service took place at St Peter's Church in East Melbourne and she was cremated at Springvale Botanical Cemetery with Methodist rites. Shortly after her death, J. K. Ewers paid tribute to Baker in an article in The West Australian, echoing A. G. Stephens' assertion that Baker "bore Joseph Furphy's standard" and quoting Furphy's compliment that Baker was "a woman who has probably never lost a friend, except by death". Baker had been a founding member of the Australian Council for Civil Liberties, and was appointed vice-president a fortnight before her death.

== See also ==
- Australian literature
- Culture of Australia
