= Furphy (surname) =

Furphy is a surname. Notable people with the surname include:

- Dan Furphy (born 20th century), American politician in Wyoming
- Holly Furphy (born 2002), Australian soccer player
- John Furphy (1842–1920), Australian blacksmith who manufactured the Furphy Farm Water Cart
- Johnny Furphy (born 2004), Australian basketball player
- Joseph Furphy (1843–1912), Australian author and poet
- Keith Furphy (born 1958), English soccer player in the US
- Ken Furphy (1931–2015), English football player and manager
- Willie Furphy (born 1986), English footballer in Scotland

== See also ==
- Furphy, an erroneous or improbable story based on rumour
