= Australian Church =

Australian religious organisation (1885 – 1957)

The Australian Church
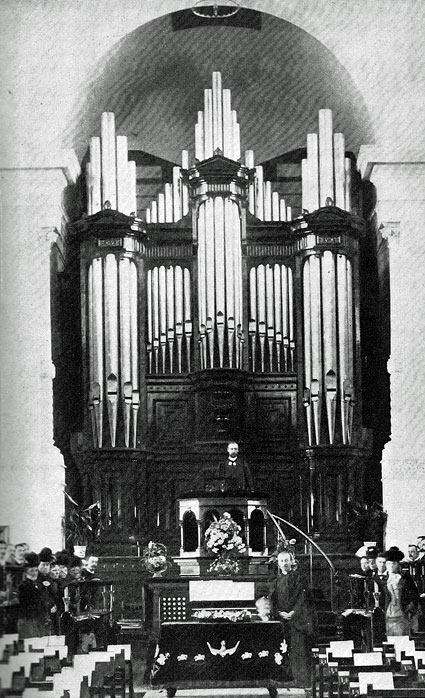
- Charles Strong, founder of the Australian Church, preaching from the pulpit c. 1898
- Classification: Christianity
- Region: Australia
- Founder: Charles Strong
- Origin: 1885
- Separated from: Presbyterian Church of Victoria
- Defunct: 1957

The Australian Church was an independent Christian church active in Australia between 1885 and 1957. It was founded by Charles Strong, a Scottish-born Presbyterian minister, after he resigned from the Presbyterian Church of Victoria while facing heresy charges. The church was politically and theologically liberal, advocating for pacifism, women's rights, and social reform. At its peak, the church's membership included many influential members of Melbourne's intellectual, political and business elite, including the future prime minister Alfred Deakin and the feminist Vida Goldstein.

The church's founder, Charles Strong, was educated at the University of Glasgow and was influenced by the teachings of the liberal theologian John Caird. Strong moved to Australia to take up the position of minister at Scots Church, Melbourne, in 1875, but soon attracted suspicion from more conservative members of the Victorian clergy for his liberal views. He faced commissions of inquiry after writing a controversial essay on the doctrine of atonement and inviting Supreme Court Chief Justice George Higinbotham to deliver a lecture on the relationship between religion and science. Strong resigned from his position while his case was being heard before the Presbyterian Assembly in 1883. He founded the Australian Church soon after and constructed an opulent church building on Flinders Street for his approximately 1000-member congregation.

The church's theology was characterised by a rejection of sectarianism and rigid theological doctrine. Strong aspired to create a single national church, free of traditional dogmas, that would contribute to the development of an Australian "national sentiment". The church and its members founded a number of affiliated organisations to operate social welfare initiatives and to advocate for political causes, including pacifism, prison reform, and labour rights.

By the 1890s the church began to experience financial strain—in part due to the substantial mortgage it had taken out to construct its Flinders Street premises—which worsened during the First World War after many members left the church due to Strong's strident pacifism and increasingly radical preaching. In 1922, the church sold its premises on Flinders Street and moved to a smaller building. It continued to operate after Strong's death in 1942, but held its final service in 1955 and was formally wound up in 1957.

== Background ==
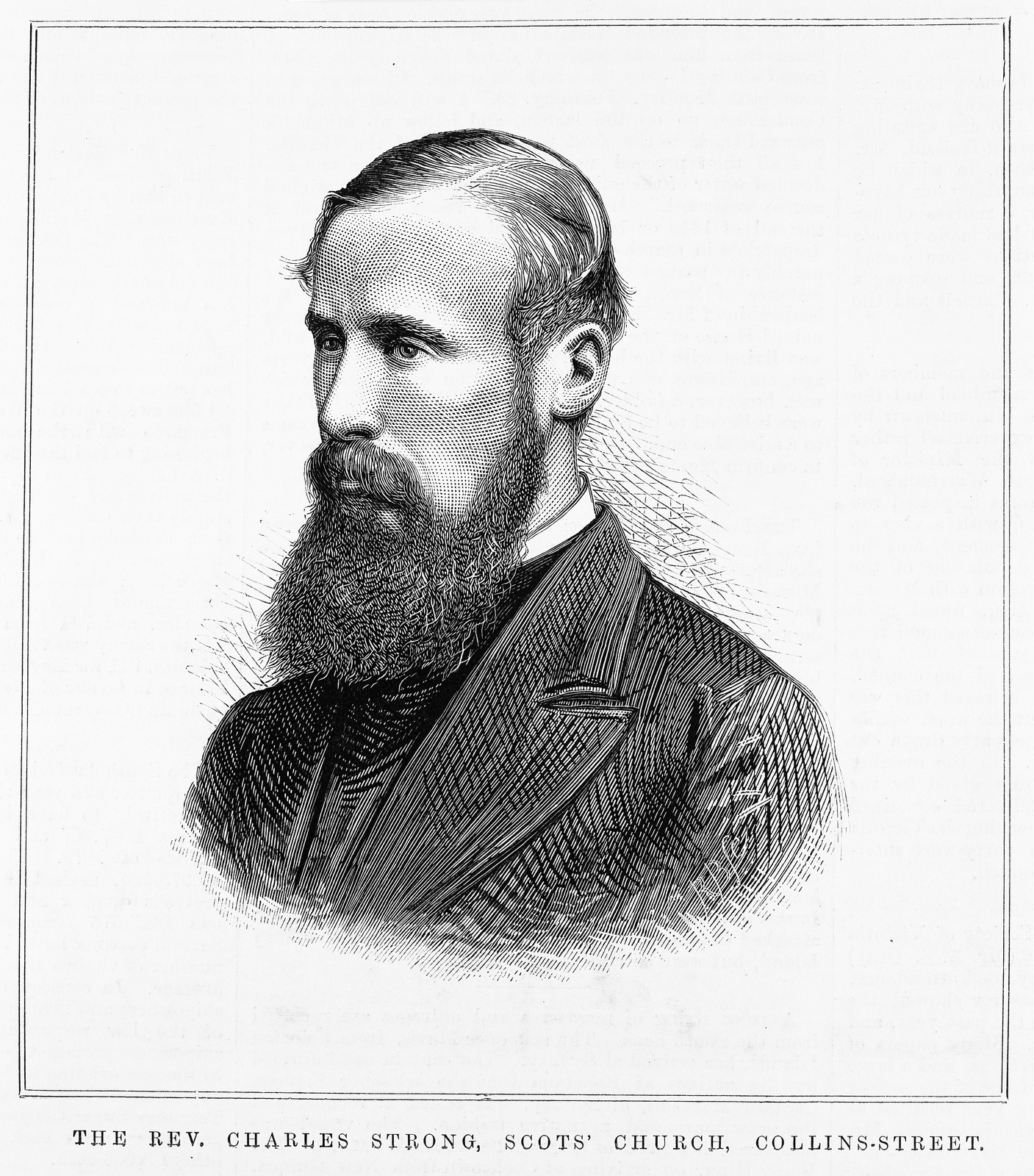
Engraving of Charles Strong c. 1881

Charles Strong, the founder of the Australian Church, was born in Scotland in 1844. He studied divinity at the University of Glasgow, where he became attracted to liberal theological currents. He was particularly influenced by the theologian John Caird, a leading figure in the philosophical movement of British idealism. Strong was ordained in the Church of Scotland in 1868 and ministered in the coal mining town of Dalmellington, the town of Greenock, and the Glasgow suburb of Anderston, before being selected as the new minister of Scots' Church, Melbourne, in 1875. He arrived in Australia in August of that year.

Between 1875 and 1877, while Strong was known for his progressive views, he did not provoke substantial opposition from more conservative members of the Melbourne Presbyterian clergy. Strong was particularly successful in attracting the educated and disaffected back to religion, and was popular among Melbourne's working class. He served a term as moderator of the Melbourne Presbytery and was a member of the councils of Scotch College and Ormond College.

Following the publication of an anonymous 1877 pamphlet attacking unnamed figures within the Presbyterian church for apostasy, however, Strong's views began to attract greater suspicion. In 1880 he published an essay on atonement in the Victorian Review in which he took a historical approach to the doctrine of atonement, arguing that Christians should treat different theories of the atonement as "figures of speech... which are not to be pressed into exact logical definitions". The essay proved controversial and led to calls for Strong to be charged with heresy. His fellow Presbyterians were also concerned by his changes to the church's worship practices and by his calls to amend the Westminster Confession of Faith. In March 1881 a committee was appointed by the Presbytery to investigate Strong's article. In August he offered to resign from the church, but agreed to instead take six months of leave at the urging of congregants and church officials.

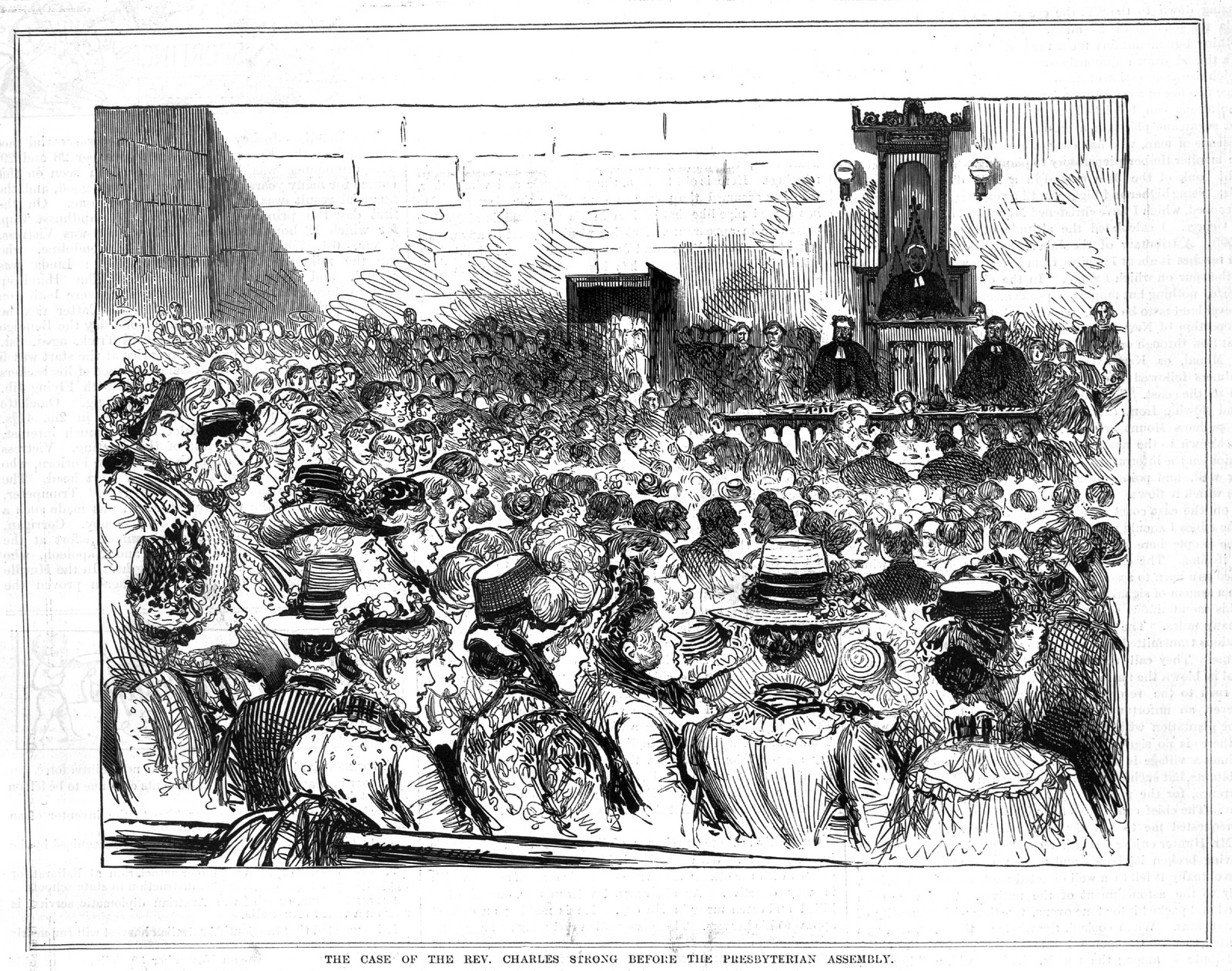
1883 print illustration of the trial of Charles Strong before the Presbyterian Assembly

After his return, Strong stirred up renewed controversy by arguing that libraries and museums should be opened on Sundays. This was viewed as an important cause by many social liberals, who believed that it would allow the working classes to educate themselves, but was opposed by those who believed it would undermine the observance of the Sabbath. In 1883, he sparked further backlash by inviting the Chief Justice of the Supreme Court of Victoria, George Higinbotham, to deliver a lecture on the relationship between science and religion. Higinbotham argued that while religion and science were compatible, religions must relinquish their "arbitrary dogmas" in order to keep up with modern science. The speech angered members of the church and led the Presbytery to appoint another committee of inquiry. Strong was threatened with heresy charges and offered his resignation from the Presbyterian church in August 1883. On 14 November, as his case was being heard before the Presbyterian Assembly, more than 2000 people farewelled Strong at the Melbourne Town Hall ahead of his planned departure from the country. The next day, as Strong began his journey back to Scotland, the assembly revoked his status as a minister of the Presbyterian Church of Victoria.

== History ==
=== Foundation ===
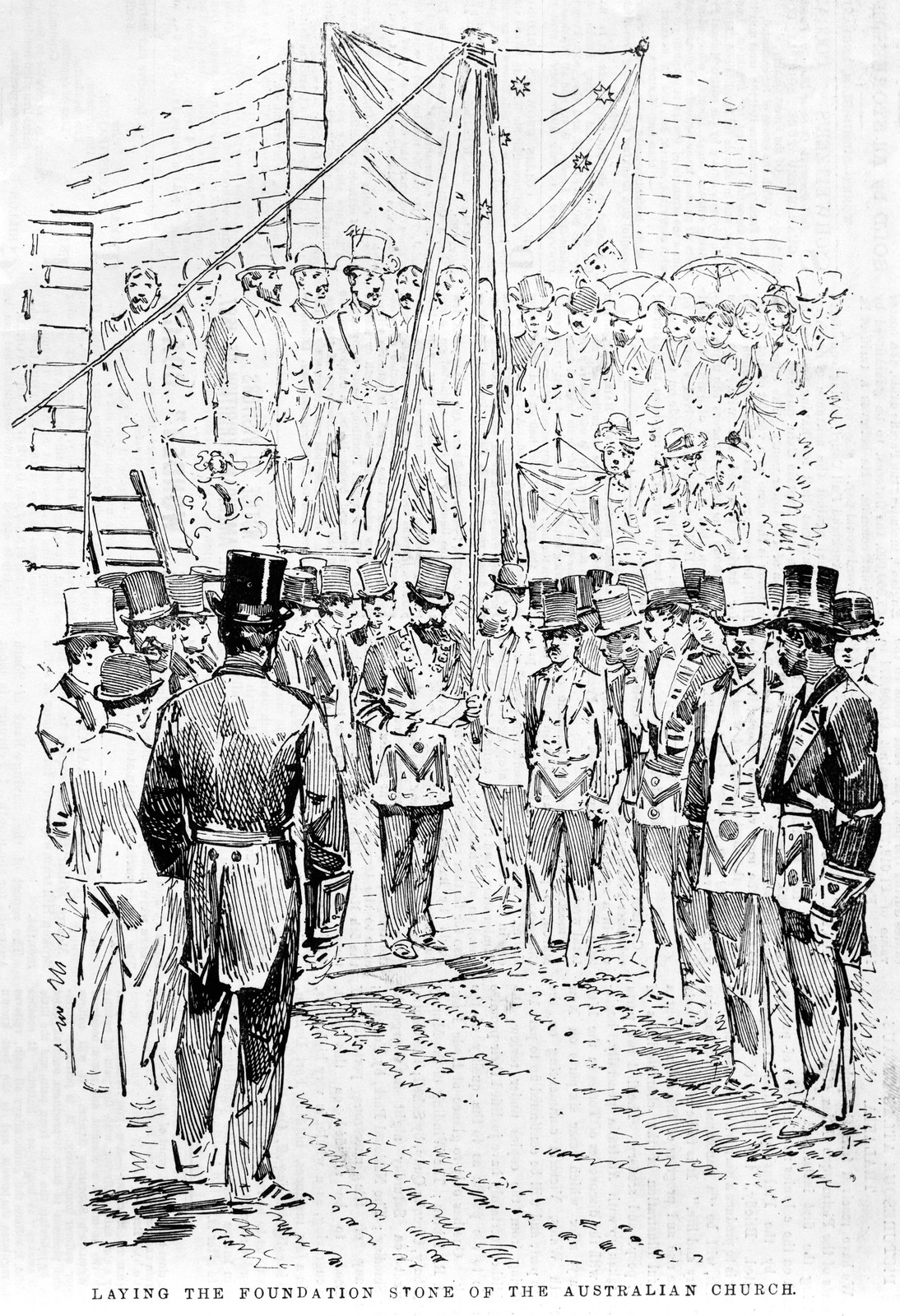
1887 print of the ceremony at which the church's foundation stone was laid

While Strong was offered ministry positions at various other Presbyterian churches during his time in Scotland, he had become disillusioned with the church. In October 1884 he returned to Melbourne and began to minister to an independent congregation of around 800 people at the Temperance Hall on Russell Street. During Strong's time overseas, a bill in the Victorian Parliament had unsuccessfully attempted to re-establish the independence of Scots Church from the Presbyterian Church of Victoria; after the bill's failure, a number of Strong's former congregants began to instead attend his services at the Temperance Hall. In November 1885 the Australian Church was officially founded; Strong was aided by an assistant minister, Francis Anderson, who led the church's evening services at the Melbourne Athenaeum. In materials distributed to the public, the church described itself as a "comprehensive Church, whose bond of union is the spiritual and the practical rather than creeds or ecclesiastical forms".

Strong received financial support from George Higinbotham and from the future prime minister Alfred Deakin to construct a church building. On 19 March 1887, the ceremony for the laying of the Australian Church's foundation stone was held with 2500 people in attendance. The new church, which could seat 1500 people, cost £21,000 to build and featured what was the largest organ in Australasia at the time.

=== Expansion ===
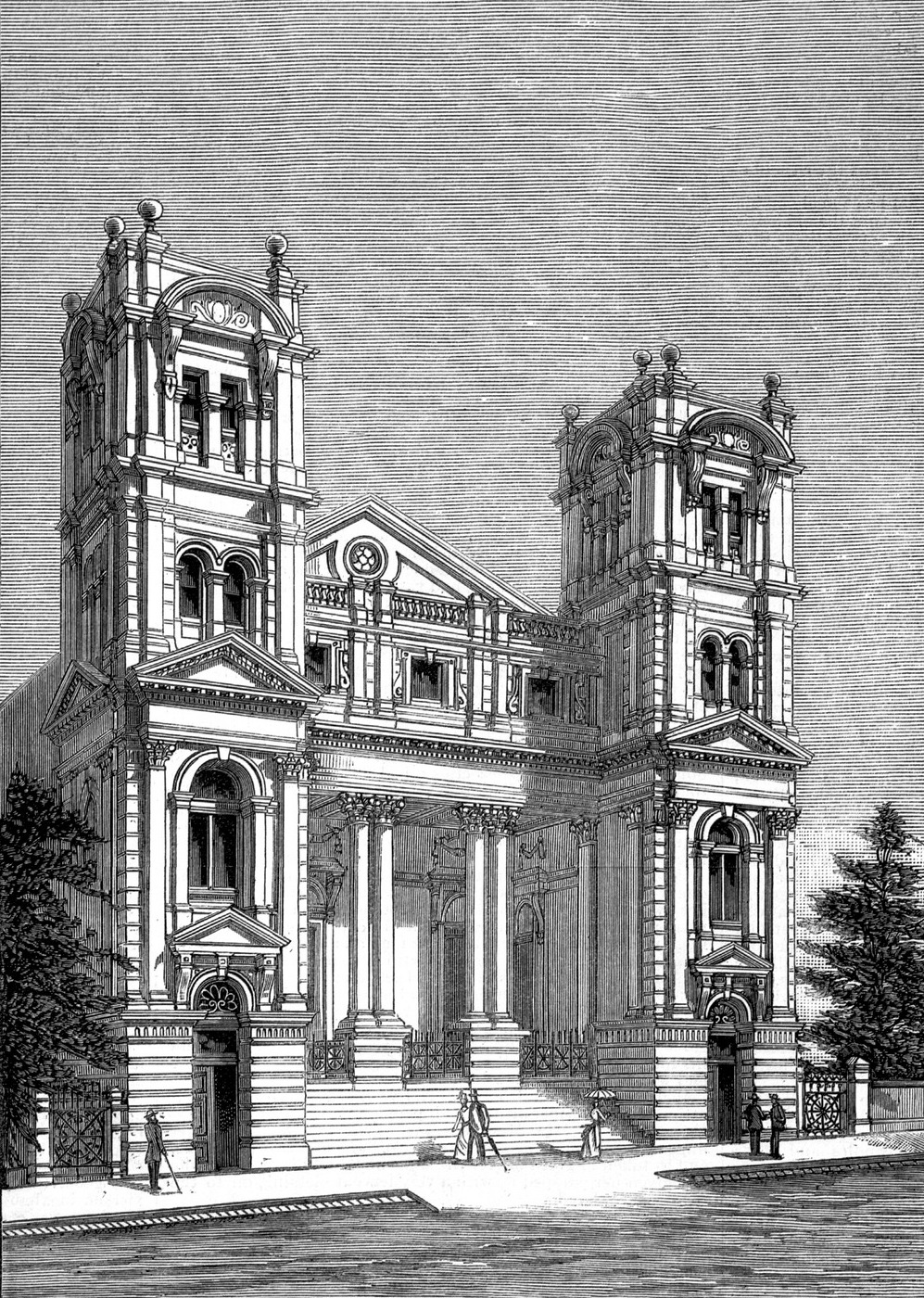
1887 print of the Australian Church building on Flinders Street, Melbourne

After founding the church, Strong promoted the establishment of affiliated congregations to advance his aim of growing the Australian Church into a national denomination. One of the more successful Australian Church affiliates was established by another former Presbyterian minister, Donald Fraser, in Newcastle in 1899. Fraser ministered to three congregations and reported over 1000 attendees in 1899, but resigned in 1904, leaving the Newcastle congregations to wither away. A handful of other efforts to found Australian Church affiliates outside of Melbourne were made, including in Lucknow and Hyde Park, but with little success. By 1905, Strong's Melbourne church was the only Australian Church congregation remaining.

=== Decline and dissolution ===
During the 1890s, Melbourne experienced an economic depression. Strong became increasingly radical in his politics and preached socialism in his sermons, advocating for land reform and economic redistribution. Strong's biographer Colin R. Badger writes that his increasing political radicalism, as opposed to his earlier religious liberalism, drove away many of the church's wealthy members and supporters. In 1894 the church had a deficit of £260 and struggled to afford repayments on the substantial loan it had taken out to pay for the construction of the church building.

In the early 1900s the church began to experience more serious financial strain. Many of the church's middle-class congregants had begun to move to the suburbs, while others were driven away during the First World War by Strong's strident pacifism and anti-conscription activism. Two members of the church's committee resigned in 1916 after Strong refused to permit the singing of the national anthem at Sunday services, arguing that its "jingo and warlike attitude" was inappropriate for the setting. While the church received a temporary reprieve after a wealthy congregant left a bequest of £5000 in her will in 1913, by 1918 the financial situation of the church had once again become perilous. The church sold the building on Flinders Street in 1922 and moved to a smaller building on Russell Street with a significantly diminished congregation. After Strong's death in 1942, the church continued to operate for a time, with the former Methodist Mervyn Plumb serving as the church's minister between 1943 and 1950. The church held its final service and sold its building on Russell Street in 1955, before formally ceasing to operate in 1957. Its assets were used to found a research organisation, the Charles Strong (Australian Church) Memorial Trust.

== Activism and affiliated organisations ==
=== Social welfare ===
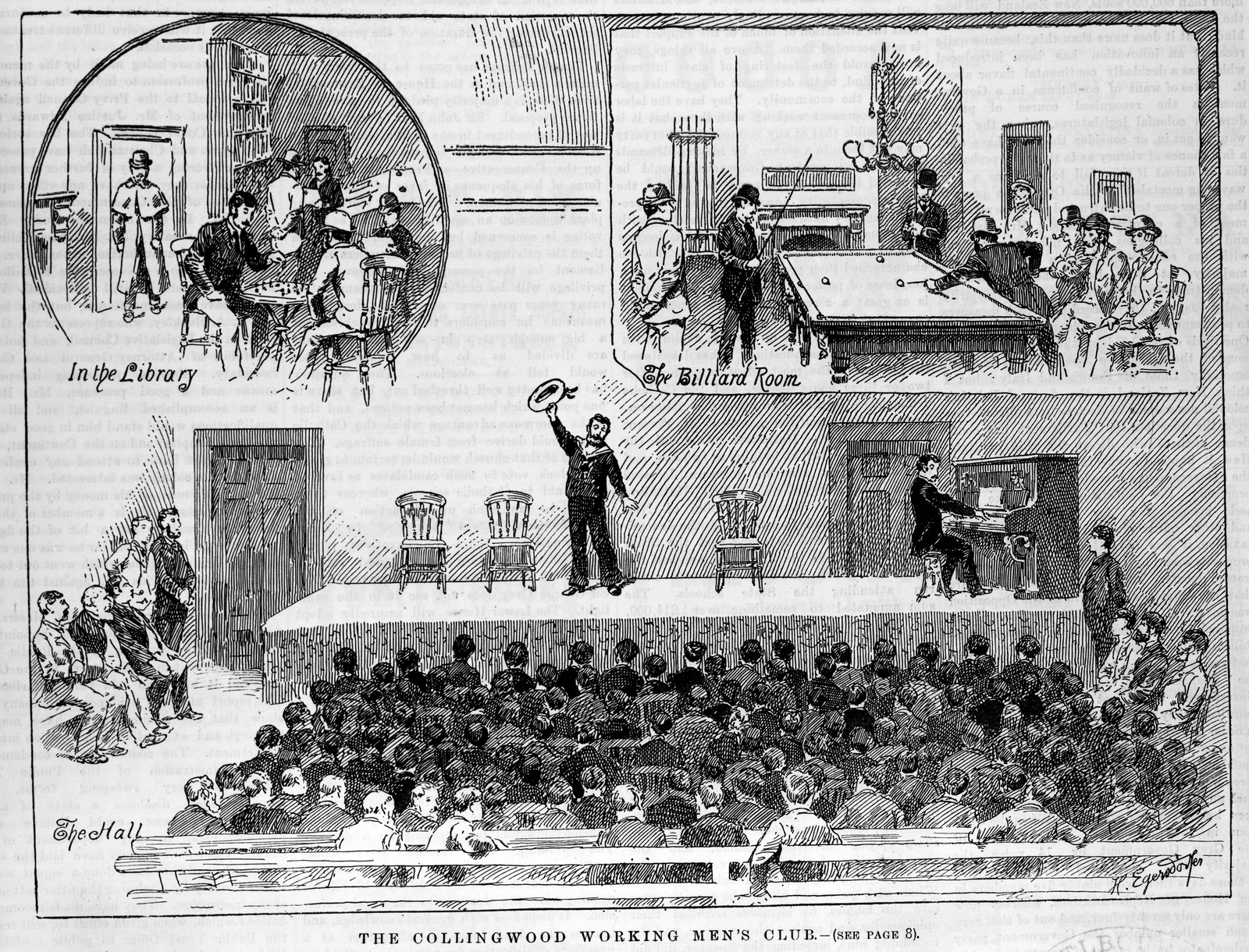
1891 print of the Collingwood Working Men's Club, featuring its hall, library, and billiards room

In 1885, soon after the church's establishment, the Social Improvement Society was founded to coordinate the church's charitable activities. The society welcomed members of any religious affiliation, despite its connection to the Australian Church. The society issued educational literature and held lectures and sermons, many of which advocated for the uplift of women's status as a means for broader improvements to social welfare.

In 1886 the Social Improvement Society established Melbourne's first crèche in Collingwood to provide for the childcare needs of working women with young children. These efforts eventually grew into the Melbourne Crèche Society, which opened four additional centres across Melbourne. In 1891 the society founded a Working Men's Club in Collingwood with support from Deakin and Higinbotham to allow working-class men to educate and improve themselves. The club hosted lectures, a debating club, and other educational programs. Strong and his wife Janet were also involved in the establishment of organisations that provided medical assistance to the poor, including the Convalescent Aid Society, the Melbourne District Nursing Society, and the Maternity Aid Society.

In 1895, the Australian Church formed the Australasian Criminology Society, with the goal of engaging in the "study and promotion of the best methods for the treatment of criminals and the prevention of crime". The society advocated for the abolition of capital punishment, the introduction of rehabilitation programs modelled on New York's Elmira Reformatory, and the establishment of children's courts. Strong also formed a Melbourne branch of the Howard League for Penal Reform in 1922.

=== Labour rights ===
The Australian Church was involved in campaigns against "sweating" (sweatshop labor). In 1895, Australian Church members, including Strong and Samuel Mauger, formed the National Anti-Sweating League. Unlike much of the era's labour rights activism, the anti-sweating campaigns were dominated by middle-class Christian liberalism rather than trade unionism. The National Anti-Sweating League organised public meetings and worked to reform labour rights legislation. It also issued publications praising businesses that had agreed to offer living wages, while shaming those who continued to operate sweatshops. Its advocacy contributed to the establishment of a new board to set minimum wages in Victoria along with other labour reforms in the 1896 Factory and Shops Act. These efforts in Victoria would help to inspire Britain's Trade Boards Act (1909), which introduced the country's first boards to set minimum wages.

=== Pacifism ===
Strong was known for being a particularly committed pacifist, and was described by the pacifist and Australian Church member Eleanor May Moore as "the father of the peace movement" in the state of Victoria. In 1900 Strong was involved in the founding of the Peace and Humanity Society. He eventually became the president of the Melbourne Peace Society, a role that he would hold until his death. He was one of the first figures in Melbourne to oppose the Boer War, founding a group that the historian Malcolm Saunders has described as "the first group in Australia formed specifically to oppose a particular war". He was also a strong opponent of conscription during the First World War, campaigning alongside other clergymen during the 1917 Australian conscription referendum.

Members of the Australian Church also formed a pacifist women's association, the Sisterhood of International Peace, in 1915. The group became the Australian branch of the Women's International League for Peace and Freedom in 1920. The historian Kate Laing argues that the group's close ties to the Australian Church gave its activism a strain of Christian internationalism and maternalism, as opposed to the radicalism of groups like the Women's Peace Army. The group published a journal, Peacewards, and held study groups and lectures for its members. Fearing legal action under the War Precautions Act 1914, the group did not take an official position in the 1916 Australian conscription referendum, but actively campaigned against the subsequent referendum in 1917.

== Membership ==
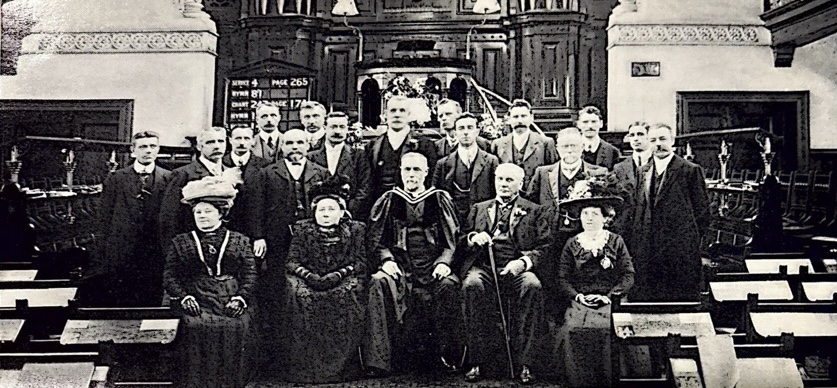
Charles Strong and the committee of the Australian Church, pictured c. 1909

The Australian Church's membership was dominated by educated, middle-class professionals, many of whom were influential members of Australian society. The historian Marion Maddox notes that one third of the members of the church's inaugural 21-member committee have entries in the Australian Dictionary of Biography, including a member of parliament, two mayors, and the Victorian chief health officer. The church's members were generally politically left-leaning, but ranged in philosophy from liberalism to socialism. Maddox notes that despite the church's sometimes radical beliefs, its tactics were often influenced by its educated and middle-class membership, who typically held a preference for fundraising and education campaigns that would encourage the working class to "adopt more middle-class modes of life", rather than engaging in militant activism.

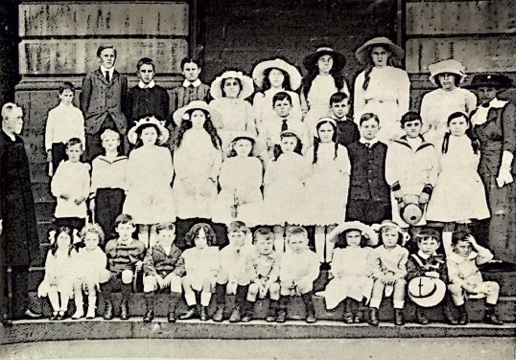
Sunday school of the Australian Church, pictured c. 1910

One of the church's notable members was Alfred Deakin, Australia's second prime minister. He grew close to Strong and the Australian Church during the 1890s, a period generally regarded as the nadir of his political career. While the circumstances under which Deakin met Strong are not known, the historian Judith Brett speculates that Deakin likely heard Strong preaching soon after his arrival in Australia, and that they may have known each other through their shared interest in spiritualism in the late 1870s. In 1891 Deakin began to attend Australian Church events, and in 1896 he formally became a member of the church. Deakin held a lifelong scepticism towards the orthodoxy and sectarianism of established religions, leading him first towards spiritualism and theosophy, and then towards the Australian Church. After the Federation of Australia, when Deakin became Australia's first attorney-general and then its second prime minister, his friendship with Strong and his involvement in the Australian Church ceased.

The church also attracted many other members of Melbourne's elite, including the feminist and suffragist Vida Goldstein, the politician and judge H. B. Higgins, the journalist Alice Henry, the entrepreneur Alfred Felton, the pacifist Eleanor May Moore, the politician Samuel Mauger, the journalist and activist Henry Hyde Champion, and the businessman Herbert Brookes.

== Theology and beliefs ==
One of the church's distinguishing features was its rejection of rigid doctrine or creed. Badger describes the church as "Protestant in the broad sense of that term" and notes that it was characterised by its scepticism towards sectarianism and theological doctrine. Strong's views were heavily influenced by the British idealism of his teacher John Caird, including the movement's suspicion of orthodoxy and dogmatism, and its rejection of dualist ideas like the strict separation of the material from the supernatural or of the religious from the secular world.

The church hoped that its lack of theological or doctrinal disputes would enable it to fulfil its goals of social reform and of growing into a national denomination. Strong believed that in order to properly establish an Australian "national sentiment", there was a need for an Australian-born national religion. At its 1886 annual meeting, the church's committee declared its aspiration of creating "a really national church—wide enough to embrace all shades of religious thought, and loving enough to seek not its own triumph or glory, but the triumph and glory of all truth, progress and righteousness and the best interests of man". In 1890, Strong said that he dreamt of "the various denominations melting into one, and the Australian Church being swallowed up in a Church of Australia."

The church's beliefs were characterised by a commitment to social reform and a belief that religion was intimately tied to economic and political life. Strong explained in an 1890 address that he believed that socialism stemmed from the same roots as religion, saying, "Both recognise selfishness, neglect of the social principle, and the subordination of human beings' welfare to the accumulation of property in the hands of the individual, as the root of much evil." Like many of the other social liberal movements of its era, however, the Australian Church was sceptical of "almsgiving" or handouts of welfare to the poor. Instead the church advocated for better working conditions, such as through its anti-sweatshop campaigns, and attempted to "improve" the poor through education campaigns and by promoting frugality and temperance.

The Australian Church was notably committed to the uplift of women. The historian Diane Kirkby has described the Australian Church as a "particularly rich environment for feminists" and as "the place where Australian feminism developed whatever particular character it had." The church allowed women, including the social reformer Catherine Helen Spence and the journalist Alice Henry, to speak publicly and to serve in prominent roles. Laing has argued that Melbourne's status as a hub for feminist and pacifist activism in the early 20th century owed in part to the influence of the Australian Church on its middle class.
