= Water cart =

Water cart may refer to:

- a type of rail tender
- Furphy, a water cart invented by John Furphy used by the Australian army during the first World War
