= School of the Air =

Type of correspondence schools in Australia

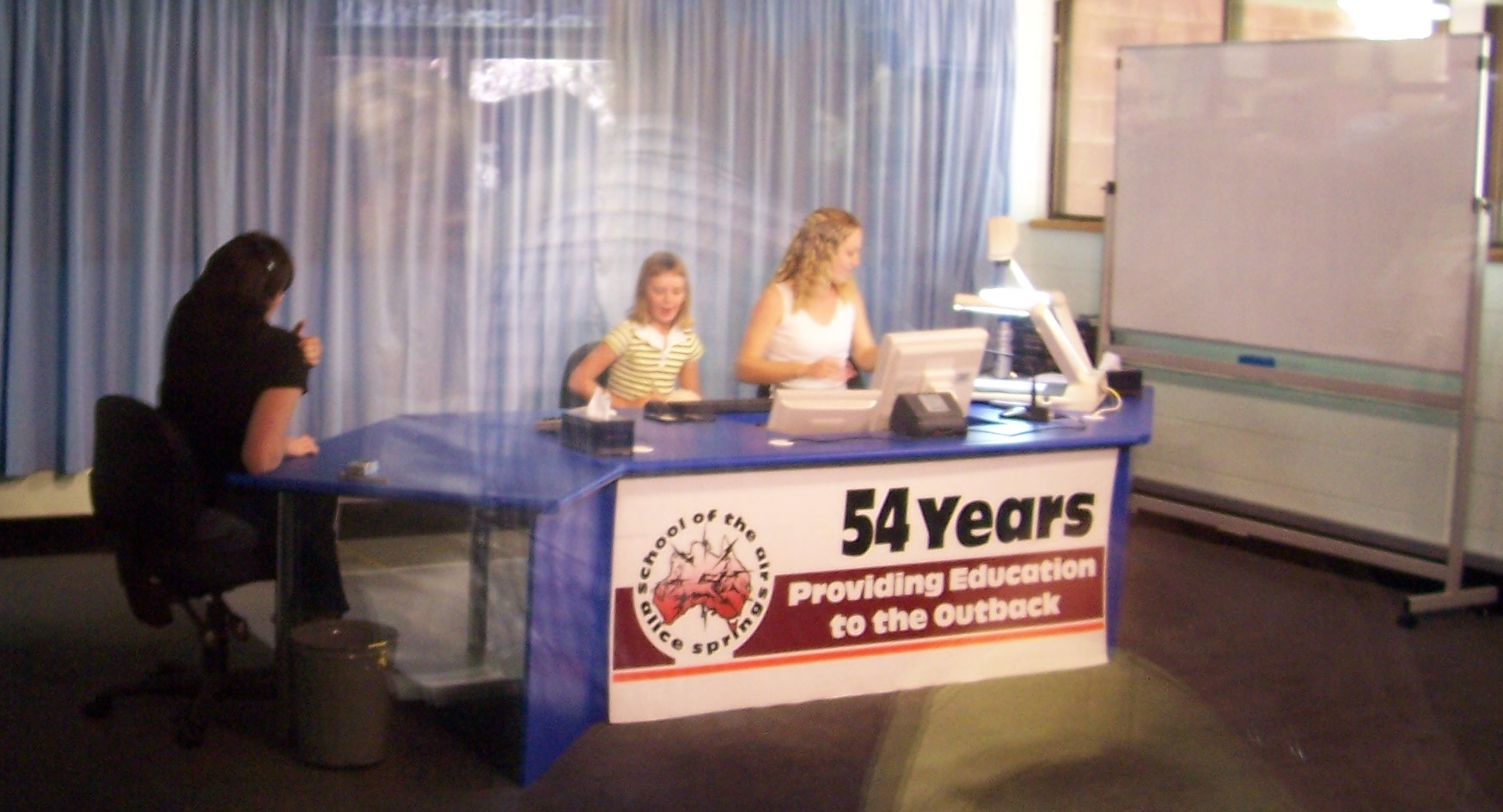
School of the Air in Alice Springs in 2005

School of the Air is a type of correspondence school catering for the primary and early secondary education of children in remote and outback Australia that historically conducted some or all classes by radio, and later by telephone and internet technology. In these areas, the school-age population is too small for a conventional school to be viable.

== History ==
Circa 1929, Alfred Traeger invented the pedal radio which allowed people in remote areas to communicate over long distances, reducing their social isolation. One important use of the technology was to receive medical advice or summon a doctor by contacting the Royal Flying Doctor Service. Educator Adelaide Miethke realised the same technology could be used for by teachers to deliver lessons to students in remote locations, leading to the establishment of Australia's School of the Air.

The first School of the Air lessons were officially delivered from the Royal Flying Doctor Service base in Alice Springs on 8 June 1951.

The service celebrated its 50th jubilee on 9 May 2001, ahead of the real jubilee on 8 June.

School classes were conducted via shortwave radio from 1951 until 2009, after which most schools switched to wireless internet technologies to deliver lessons that include live one-way video feeds and clear two-way audio.

The service celebrated its 70th year on 8 June 2021.

== Method ==
There are School of the Air programmes in all states except Tasmania.

Each student has direct contact with a teacher in an inland town such as Broken Hill, Alice Springs or Meekatharra. Each student typically spends one hour per day receiving group or individual lessons from the teacher, and the rest of the day working through the assigned materials with a parent, older sibling or a hired home-stay tutor.

Originally the students received their course materials and returned their written work and projects to their hub centre using either the Royal Flying Doctor Service or post office services. However the extension of Internet services into the outback now enables more rapid review of each child's homework.

As the children are in isolated situations, the School of the Air is frequently their first chance of socialisation with children outside their immediate family. This is supplemented by 3 or 4 annual gatherings where the children travel to the school to spend one week with their teacher and classmates.

Studies have shown that such education is on par with, if not better than, standards set by the traditional methods of schooling.

Each state of Australia that uses this means of education has well-documented checks and overviews of the service.

== Honours ==
In 2009 as part of the Q150 celebrations, the School of the Air was announced as one of the Q150 Icons of Queensland for its role as an iconic "innovation and invention".

== Schools of the Air ==
Schools of the Air operate from:

=== New South Wales ===
- Broken Hill
- Tibooburra

=== Northern Territory ===
- Alice Springs
- Katherine

=== Queensland ===
- Cairns
- Charleville
- Charters Towers
- Longreach
- Mount Isa
- Brisbane

=== South Australia ===
- Port Augusta – now part of Open Access College

=== Victoria ===
- Thornbury

=== Western Australia ===
- Carnarvon
- Kalgoorlie
- Kimberley region, located in Derby
- Meekatharra
- Port Hedland

== See also ==
- Alice Springs School of the Air
- School of Isolated and Distance Education
- Educational School Sound System was a common installation in South Australia.
- Our Rural Magazine, an example of an earlier pre-radio forms of distant education communication in Western Australia
- Queensland School for Travelling Show Children did schooling for children whose families were constantly travelling, but shut in 2012.
