= John K. Ewers =

21st century Australian novelist and short story writer

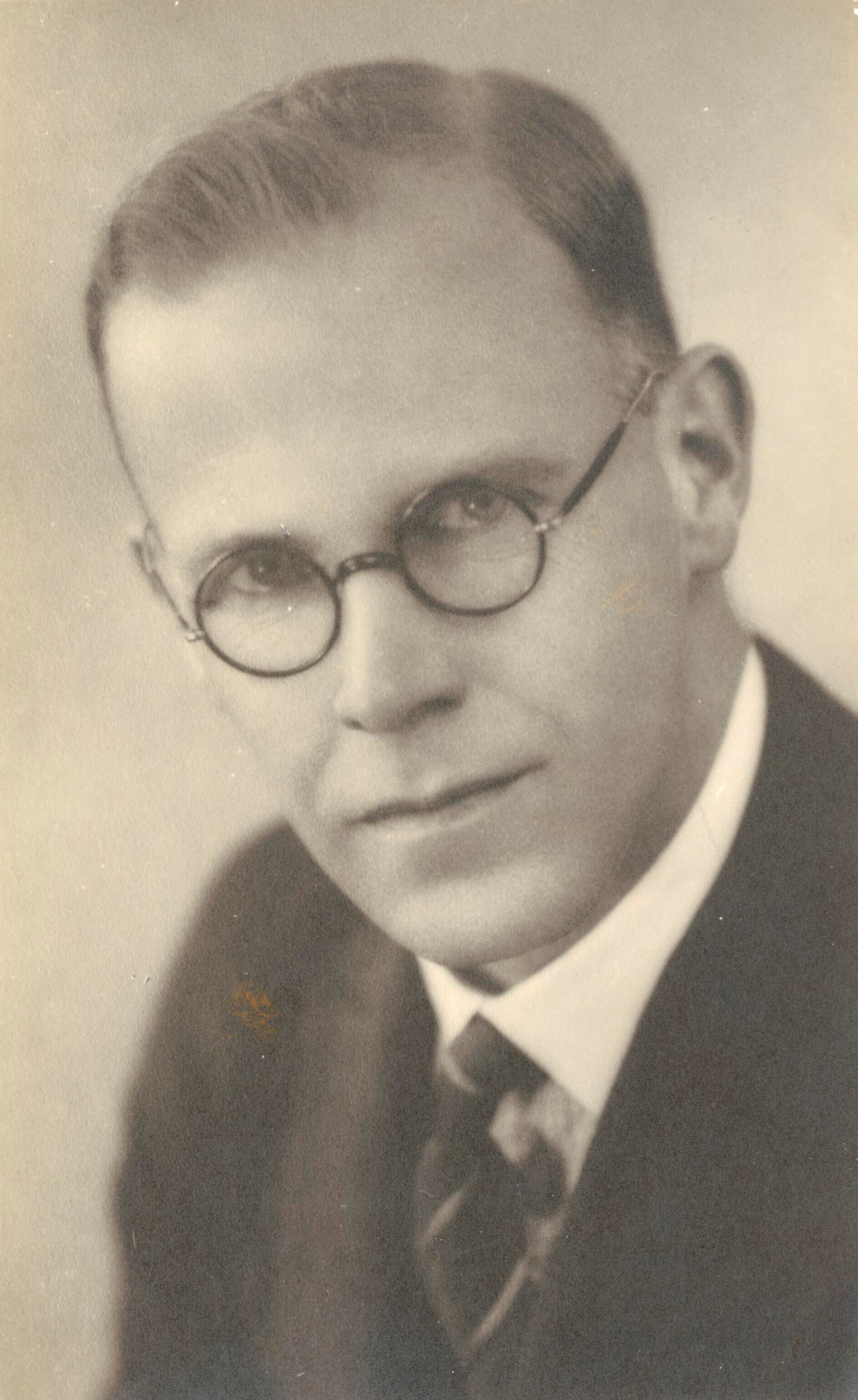
- J.K. Ewers in Sydney c. 1936
- Born: 13 June 1904
- Died: 9 March 1978 (aged 73)
- Spouse: Jean Grant McIntyre
- Writing career
- Genre: Fiction

John Keith Ewers (13 June 1904 – 9 March 1978) was a novelist, poet, schoolteacher and short story writer from Western Australia.

== Biography ==
Ewers was the second son of Ernest Ewers, orchardist, and his wife Annie Eliza, née Gray. When he was 6 years old, his mother died. Ewers was educated at James Street Intermediate and Perth Modern schools, and at Claremont Teachers College.

He began writing while he was a young teacher. The Australian Journal published his first short story in 1924 under the nom-de-plume, J. K. Waterjugs, a play on the meaning of ewer. He wrote early on in his career in Our Rural Magazine and Walkabout.

Ewers was involved in the Western Australian branch of the Fellowship of Australian Writers and was its president. He campaigned to preserve "Tom Collins" House (the home of Joseph Furphy, author of Such is Life), in the Perth suburb of Swanbourne.

He also co-authored, with Deirdre Ellis Weston, the grammar textbooks that were used widely throughout Western Australian schools during the 1950s to 1970s.

In June 1936, Ewers married school teacher and University of Western Australia scientist Jean Grant McIntyre. They had one child, Trisha Kotai-Ewers born in 1939.

== Works ==
- Money street : a novel (London, 1933)
- The story of the pipe-line: being an account of the construction of the Coolgardie water scheme with some chapters on the early history of Western Australia (Perth, 1935)
- Fire on the Wind (London, 1935, Hodder & Stoughton)
- Tell the people!: an explanation of the little-known writings of Joseph Furphy (Tom Collins) in the light of their value for Australia to-day (Sydney, 1943)
- Tales from the Dead Heart (Sydney, 1944)
- Men Against the Earth (Melbourne, 1946)
- Perth Boys' School, 1847-1947: the story of the first hundred years of a great school, with a background of the history of education in Western Australia (Perth, 1947)
- For Heroes to Live In (Melbourne, 1948)
- Harvest and Other Stories (Sydney, 1949)
- With the Sun on My Back (Angus & Robertson, Sydney, 1953)
- Who Rides on the River? (Sydney, 1956)
- Bruce Rock (1959)
- The Western Gateway: a History of Fremantle (City of Fremantle and UWA Press, Nedlands. 1971 2nd rev. ed.; 1st ed. 1948)
- I came naked : a selection of verse 1970-1975 (Black Rock, Vic. 1976.)
- Long enough for a joke: an autobiography (Fremantle Arts Centre Press, 1983)

With Deirdre Ellis Weston:

- Weston, Deirdre Ellis; Ewers, John Keith (1950–1959). English for High Schools. Perth, Western Australia: Carrolls. OCLC 219859645.
- Ewers, John Keith; Weston, Deirdre Ellis (1971). Passport to Understanding. Melbourne, Australia: Thomas Nelson. ISBN 0170049035. OCLC 27499632.
- Ewers, John Keith; Weston, Deirdre Ellis (1973). Passport to Adventure. Passport Series. Melbourne, Australia: Thomas Nelson. ISBN 0170049019. OCLC 220402061.
