= Eleanor May Moore =

Australian pacifist (1875–1949)

- Born: 10 March 1875; Lancefield, Victoria, Australia
- Died: 1 October 1949 (aged 74); Toorak, Victoria, Australia
- Education: Presbyterian Ladies' College, Melbourne
- Organization: Women's International League for Peace and Freedom (previously Sisterhood of International Peace)
- Title: international secretary
- Movement: Pacifism; Feminism

Eleanor May Moore (10 March 1875 – 1 October 1949) was an Australian pacifist. Moore was also a feminist. She was involved in the peace movement as a member of the Sisterhood of International Peace (SIP), which later became part of the Women's International League for Peace and Freedom (WILPF).

== Biography ==
=== Early life ===
Moore was born in Lancefield, Victoria. She attended the Presbyterian Ladies' College, Melbourne, where she edited the school paper and trained as a stenographer.

=== Career ===
Moore's family were members of the Australian Church, founded by pacifist and preacher, Charles Strong. After Strong formed the Sisterhood of International Peace (SIP) in 1915, Moore joined, becoming the international secretary. She represented the SIP in May 1919 at the International Women's Congress in Zurich. Later, when the SIP became the Women's International League for Peace and Freedom (WILPF), Moore continued working as the secretary and was involved in the group until her death. Moore represented WILPF at the Pan-Pacific Union Women's conferences at Honolulu in 1928 and 1930.

Moore was against using war to solve conflicts; she said: "I know that, however long the fight continues, in the end it must be settled by negotiation." Moore chose not to marry and cared for her parents who lived to be 91 and 96. She worked on a book, The Quest for Peace, finishing it in 1949.

=== Death and legacy ===
Moore died in Toorak, Victoria on 1 October 1949.

She was posthumously inducted onto the Victorian Honour Roll of Women in 2008.
