= Rigby's Romance =

Book by Joseph Furphy

- First book edition (1921)
- Author: Joseph Furphy
- Language: English
- Genre: Poetry collection
- Publisher: C. J. De Garis
- Publication date: 1905
- Publication place: Australia
- Media type: Print
- Pages: 276pp
- Preceded by: The Poems of Joseph Furphy
- Followed by: The Buln Buln and the Brolga

Rigby's Romance (1905) is a novel by Australian author Joseph Furphy, written under his pseudonym "Tom Collins". The book was originally serialised in The Barrier Truth from 27 October 1905 to 20 July 1906. It was not released in book form until 1921 when the C. J. DeGaris Publishing House published its full-length edition.

The novel is an expanded and revised version of the fifth chapter of the original Such Is Life manuscript.

== Plot summary ==
Tom Collins is travelling to Yooringa from Echuca to fulfill a contract on a cattle run. He also hopes to meet up with his old friend Jefferson Rigby. On the way he encounters Kate Vanderdecken, Rigby's former sweetheart, who has travelled to Australia searching for him.

== Critical reception ==
A reviewer in The Daily Standard (Brisbane) found the book slow going but worth it in the end: "The book has some quaint features, and its quaintness of language and style is rather discouraging at first but it grows on one, and presently the reader finds himself engrossed in picturesque chatter that is at times distinctly clever. Those who expect thrills will be disappointed. The romance of Rigby is a poor sort of affairs as romances go - not nearly so attractive as several other romances related in the book; yet on it "Tom Collins" - this was Furphy's pen-name - has hung a most entertaining and often thought provoking account of an evening's yarning by a collection of typical Australian out-back characters. There is an abundance of Australianism in this dialogue, and some subtle radical philosophy too."

== See also ==
- 1905 in Australian literature
