= Charles Strong =

Scottish-born Australian minister

The Reverend Charles Strong
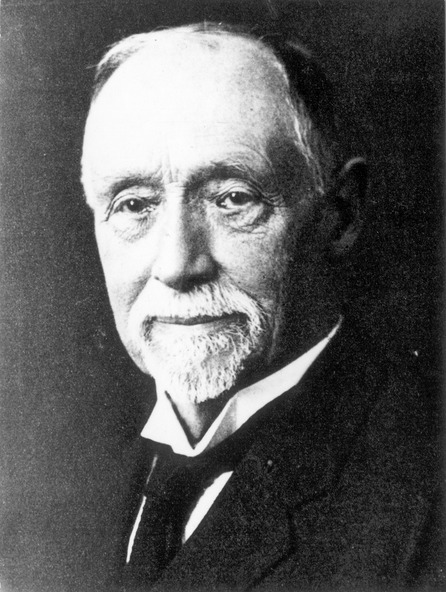
- Strong c. 1910

Personal life
- Born: 26 September 1844 Dailly, Ayrshire, Scotland
- Died: 12 February 1942 (aged 97) Lorne, Victoria, Australia
- Spouse: Janet Fullarton (m. 1872; died 1919)
- Education: University of Glasgow

Religious life
- Religion: Christianity
- Denomination: Presbyterianism
- Church: Church of Scotland (to 1883); Australian Church (from 1885)
- Ordination: 1868

Charles Strong (26 September 1844 – 12 February 1942) was a Scottish-born Australian preacher and the founder of the Australian Church. Strong was educated at the University of Glasgow, where he adopted a liberal and broad church theology under the influence of his mentor John Caird. After being ordained in the Church of Scotland and holding a series of Scottish ministries, he was selected as the new minister of Scots' Church, Melbourne, in 1875. Upon moving to Australia he was initially a popular and successful minister, but eventually began to attract criticism due to his liberal views. Facing a heresy trial, he resigned from the Presbyterian Church in 1883.

In 1885 Strong founded the Australian Church. The church quickly attracted a large following, particularly among Melbourne's economic, political, and intellectual elite. Strong was active in advocating for a range of charitable and political causes, including labour rights, prison reform, and pacifism. However, his increasingly radical preaching and the financial difficulties of his church eventually caused the Australian Church to decline, and in 1922 it sold its premises and moved to a smaller building nearby. Strong died in 1942 at the age of 97. The Australian Church continued for a time after his death, but eventually ceased to operate in 1957.

== Early life ==
Strong was born on 26 September 1844 in Dailly, Scotland, to the Reverend David Strong and Margaret Paterson (née Roxburgh). Strong was educated at the Ayr Academy and Glasgow Academy, and studied Arts and Divinity at the University of Glasgow between 1859 and 1864. He was strongly influenced by the theologian John Caird, a leading figure in the philosophical movement known as British idealism, and came to hold a liberal and broad church theology.

After graduating from university, Strong became a private tutor to the son of Allen Thomson and travelled across continental Europe. He began ministering in the coal mining town of Dalmellington in 1868. In October of that year he was ordained in the Church of Scotland and began to minister in Greenock. On 16 March 1871 he was inducted to the church in Anderston, a suburb of Glasgow, where Caird was among his congregants. In 1872 Strong married Janet Julia Fullarton, who he had met while ministering in Greenock.

== Australia ==
=== Presbyterian Church ===
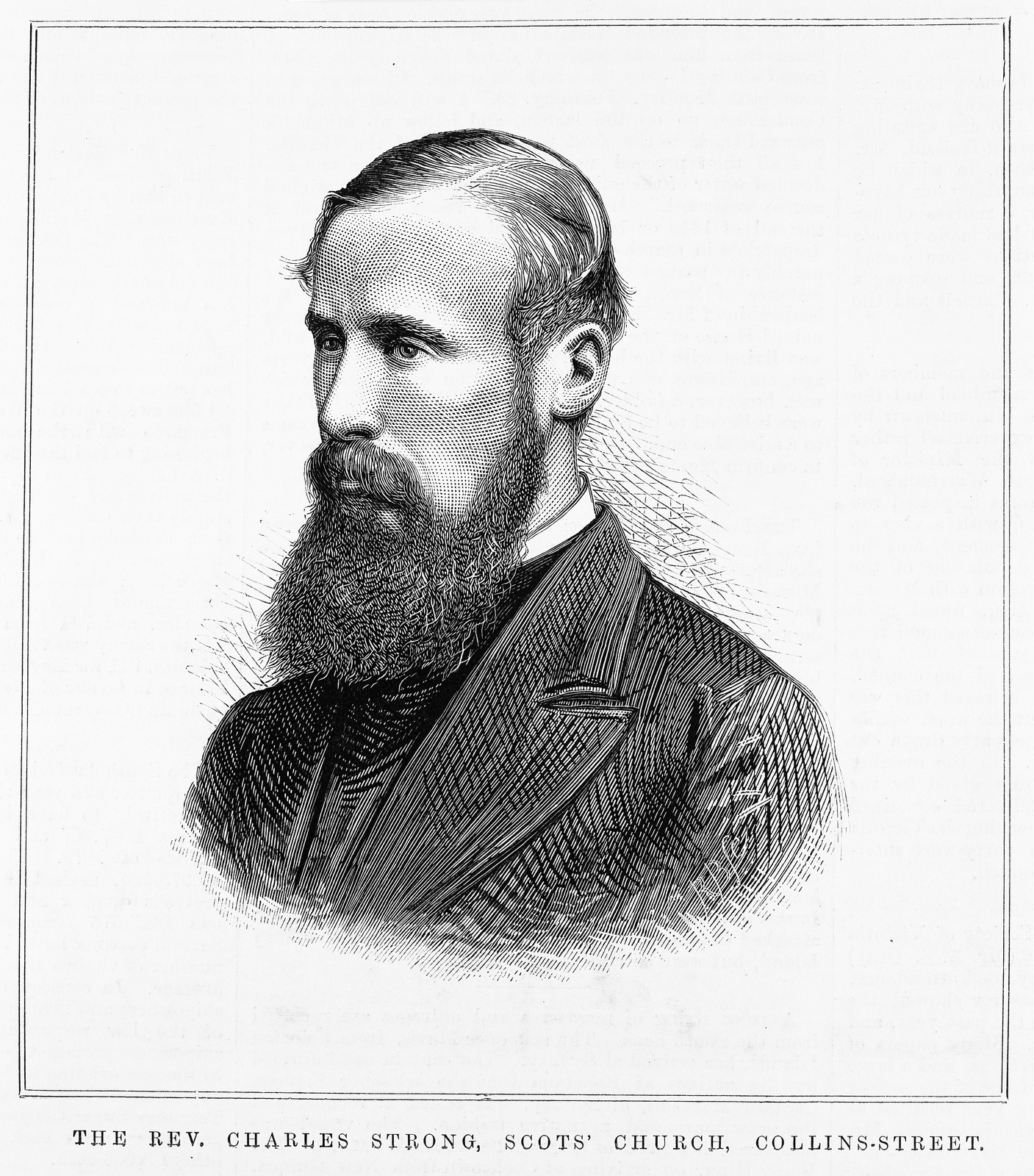
Engraving of Strong c. 1881

In May 1875 Strong was chosen as the new minister of Scots' Church, Melbourne; he arrived in Australia with his family in August of that year. Strong quickly found success as a minister, becoming popular among Melbourne's working class and successfully drawing many educated and disaffected congregants back towards religion. He served a term as moderator of the Melbourne Presbytery and was a member of the councils of Scotch College and Ormond College.

Strong's liberal views on theological matters, however, eventually led to suspicion from some in the Presbyterian Church. In 1880 Strong published a controversial essay titled "The Atonement" in the Victorian Review, which led the Presbytery to appoint a committee to investigate the article. His changes to the church's worship practices and his calls to reform the Westminster Confession of Faith also concerned his fellow clergy. In August he offered to resign from the church, but agreed to instead take six months of leave at the request of his congregants and church officials.

After Strong returned to Melbourne, he provoked renewed backlash by advocating for the opening of libraries and museums on Sundays. This was a popular cause among social liberals, who hoped to promote self-education among the working class, but was opposed by those who feared that it would undermine the sanctity of the Sabbath. In 1883, he invited the Chief Justice of the Supreme Court of Victoria, George Higinbotham, to deliver a lecture on the relationship between science and religion. Higinbotham's speech angered members of the church by suggesting that religions should become more flexible in their beliefs to keep up with modern science, and led the Presbytery to appoint another committee of inquiry to investigate Strong. Strong offered his resignation from the church in September 1883 under threat of heresy charges. On 15 November, as Strong embarked on his return to Scotland, the assembly revoked his status as a minister of the Presbyterian Church of Victoria.

=== Australian Church ===
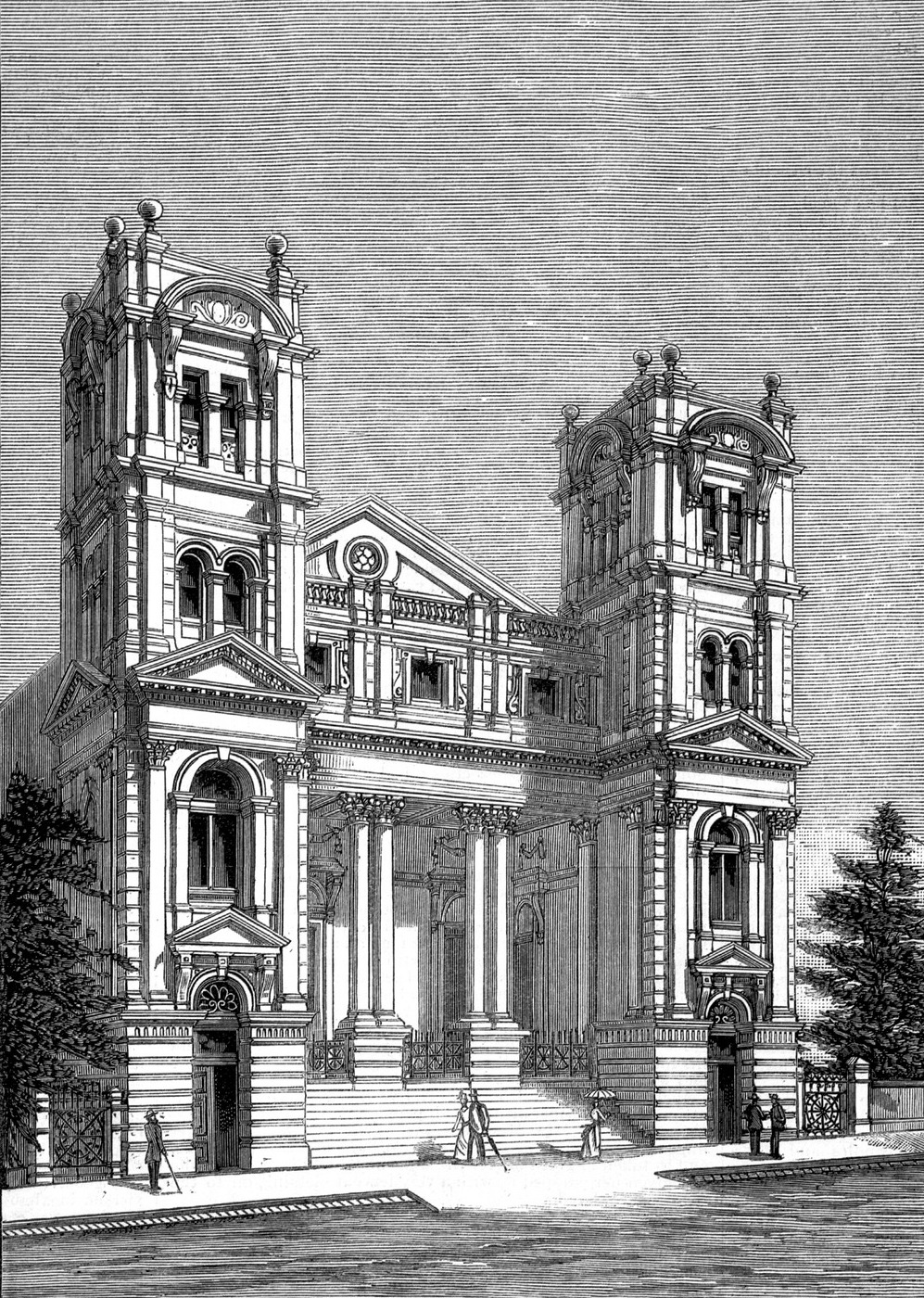
1887 print of the Australian Church building on Flinders Street, Melbourne

During Strong's time in Scotland, he was offered ministry positions at various other Presbyterian churches. But he had lost his faith in the denomination, and resolved to found an independent church. In October 1884 he returned to Melbourne and began to minister to an independent congregation of around 800 people at the Temperance Hall on Russell Street. In November of that year he became the first minister of the newly founded Australian Church. The church built a lavish new building on Flinders Street, which cost £21,000 to construct and could seat 1500 congregants. It also featured what was the largest organ in Australasia at the time.

Strong held aspirations of growing the Australian Church into a national denomination, and actively supported the establishment of affiliated congregations outside of Melbourne. Strong believed that in order to properly establish an Australian "national sentiment", there was a need for an Australian-born national religion. In 1890, Strong said that he dreamt of "the various denominations melting into one, and the Australian Church being swallowed up in a Church of Australia." In materials distributed to the public, the church described itself as a "comprehensive Church, whose bond of union is the spiritual and the practical rather than creeds or ecclesiastical forms". Strong's preaching expressed a commitment to social reform and a belief that religion was intimately tied to economic and political life, as well as a particularly strong commitment to the improvement of the status of women.

Strong was also involved in the church's charitable efforts. In 1885 the church established the Social Improvement Society to coordinate its social works. The society established Melbourne's first crèche in Collingwood to provide for the childcare needs of working women with young children, and eventually opened four additional centres across Melbourne. Strong also established a Working Men's Club in Collingwood to allow working-class men to educate and improve themselves, offering lectures and other educational programs. He was involved in the founding of a number of organisations that provided medical assistance to the poor, including the Convalescent Aid Society, the Melbourne District Nursing Society, and the Maternity Aid Society. He also helped to establish the Australasian Criminology Society, which advocated for the abolition of capital punishment, the introduction of rehabilitation programs modelled on New York's Elmira Reformatory, and the establishment of children's courts. Alongside other Australian Church figures, Strong was one of the founding members of the National Anti-Sweating League, which advocated against sweatshop labour.

Strong was also a particularly devoted pacifist. Strong was involved in the founding of the Peace and Humanity Society and eventually became president of the Melbourne Peace Society, a position that he would hold until his death. He was one of the earliest opponents of the Boer War in Melbourne and founded a group that the historian Malcolm Saunders has described as "the first group in Australia formed specifically to oppose a particular war". He was also a strong opponent of conscription during the First World War, campaigning alongside other clergymen during the 1917 Australian conscription referendum.

Strong's pacifism and the increasing political radicalism of his preaching contributed to the decline of the Australian Church. By the mid-1890s Strong had already begun to call for economic redistribution and land reform in his sermons. During the First World War two members of the church's committee resigned after Strong refused to permit the singing of the national anthem at Sunday services. The church was also long beset by financial issues, which were exacerbated by Melbourne's 1890s depression and by the substantial loan that it had taken out for the construction of its Flinders Street premises. After receiving a few temporary reprieves, the church eventually sold its building on Flinders Street in 1922 and moved to a smaller building on Russell Street with a significantly diminished congregation.

== Later life ==
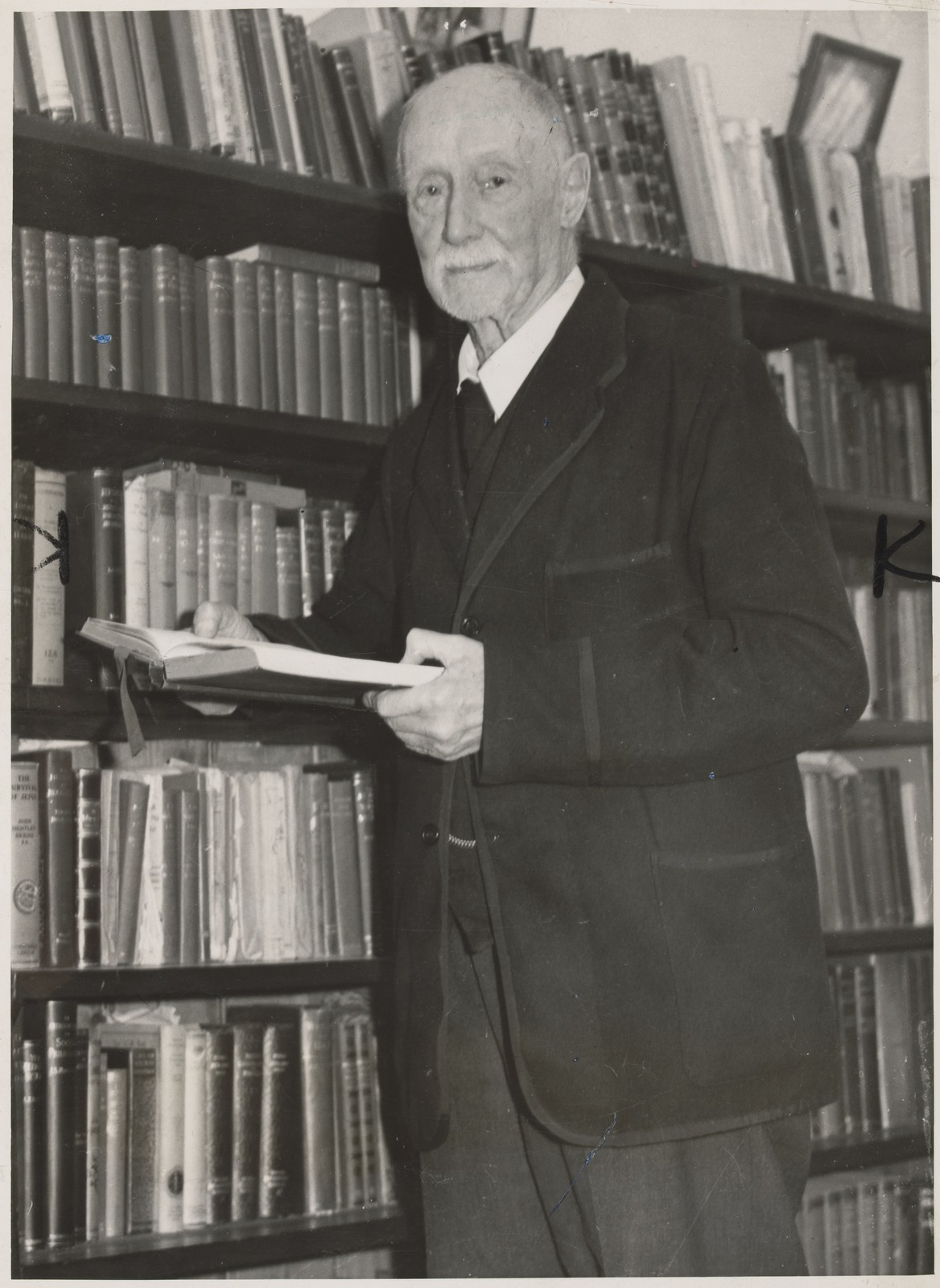
Strong in 1939, aged 95

In his later years, Strong campaigned for Indigenous welfare, prison reform, and for the better treatment of disabled children. In 1923 Strong and other members of the church worked with the Victorian government to establish a boarding school in Travancore for children with disabilities. He also became a particularly vocal advocate for the abolition of the death penalty, and in 1922 formed a Melbourne branch of the Howard League for Penal Reform.

Strong's wife Janet died in 1919. On 12 February 1942, he died while holidaying in Lorne after suffering a fall. The Australian Church continued to operate until 1955, when it held its final service. The organisation was formally wound up in 1957 and its assets used to found a research organisation, the Charles Strong (Australian Church) Memorial Trust.
