= Joseph Furphy =

Australian author and poet (1843–1912)

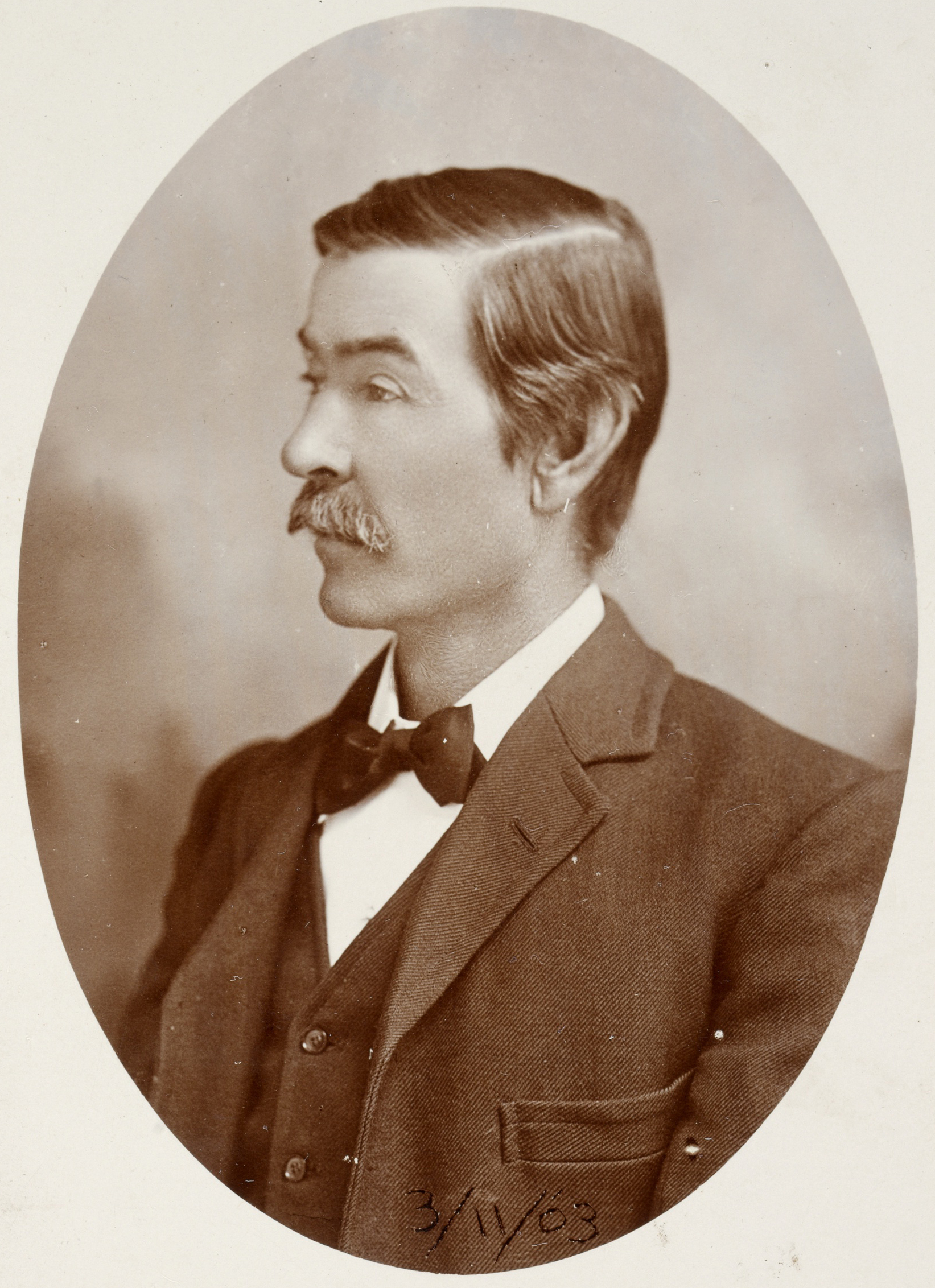
- Born: 26 September 1843; Yering, Victoria, Australia
- Died: 13 September 1912 (aged 68); Claremont, Western Australia
- Occupations: Author, poet
- Writing career
- Pen name: Tom Collins
- Genre: Australian literature

Joseph Furphy (Irish: Seosamh Ó Foirbhithe; 26 September 1843 – 13 September 1912) was an Australian author and poet. He mostly wrote under the pseudonym Tom Collins and is best known for his novel Such Is Life (1903), regarded as an Australian classic.

== Personal life ==
Furphy was born at Yering Station in Yering, Victoria. His father, Samuel Furphy, was originally a tenant farmer from Tandragee, County Armagh, Ireland, who emigrated to Australia in c. 1840-1841. In about 1850 the family moved to Kangaroo Ground, Victoria.

In 1904, Furphy and his wife moved to Western Australia to join his sons. He built a house at Swanbourne. Furphy died in Claremont on 13 September 1912 and is buried in Karrakatta Cemetery.

== Literary career ==
"I have just finished writing a full-sized novel; title, Such is Life; the scene, Riverina and northern Vic; temper, democratic; bias, offensively Australian."

— Furphy's famous self-introduction to J. F. Archibald, published in The Bulletin, April 1897

While living at Shepparton, he was encouraged in his writing by Kate Baker, a schoolteacher who boarded with his mother. He sent a story 'The Mythical Sundowner' to The Bulletin under the name 'Warrigal Jack' and it was accepted for publication. Later works were published under the pseudonym 'Tom Collins' which may have come from the slang term meaning "a fellow about town whom many sought to kill for touching them on 'sore points'".

His most famous work is Such Is Life, a fictional account of the life of rural dwellers, including bullock drivers, squatters and itinerant travellers, in southern New South Wales and Victoria, during the 1880s. In 1897 the manuscript was sent to The Bulletin where A. G. Stephens recognised its worth. He suggested cuts including the replacement of two entire chapters. Stephens persuaded the proprietors of The Bulletin to publish the revised Such Is Life because it was a great Australian work although not commercially viable. It was published in 1903 under his pseudonym 'Tom Collins' and only sold about a third of the print run. Through the efforts of Kate Baker who bought the residual copies from The Bulletin, later editions were brought out after Furphy's death.

Having removed the original chapters 2 and 5 from Such is Life, Furphy considered joining these portions together as the basis for another novel but instead decided to focus on chapter 5 separately. He expanded and remodelled the chapter to form Rigby's Romance, which was serialised in The Barrier Truth from 27 October 1905 to 20 July 1906. It would be released in book form in 1921. After moving to Western Australia in 1905, Furphy commenced work on revising the original second chapter, which he titled The Lyre Bird and the Native Companion before retitling it The Buln-Buln and the Brolga. Never published in his lifetime, the manuscript was provided by Furphy's son Samuel and ultimately published in book form in 1946. Both of these subsequent novels feature the same protagonist, Tom Collins, and function as adjuncts to the first novel.

== Legacy ==
Such is Life has been described as Australia's Moby Dick because, like Melville's book, it was neglected for thirty or forty years before being discovered as a classic. The novel contains possibly the first written incidence of the Australian and New Zealand idiom "ropeable". Chapter One contains the following phrase: "On't ole Martin be ropeable when he sees that fence!" The historian Stuart MacIntyre has said the book challenged the assumption that "nothing of significance ever happened" in Australia or that Australians lacked "creative originality".

A full biography of Furphy was written through a collaboration of Australian author Miles Franklin and Furphy's friend Kate Baker, titled Joseph Furphy: The Legend of a Man and His Book, in 1944.

To honour Furphy, in 1992 his and his brother's descendants established the Furphy Literary award. On the 100th anniversary of Such is Life they also funded a statue in Furphy's home town. The home which Furphy built in Swanbourne is now the headquarters of the West Australian branch of the Fellowship of Australian Writers.

Furphy's popularity may have influenced the usage of the Australian slang word "furphy", meaning a "tall story". However, scholars consider it more likely that the word originated with water carts, produced in large numbers by J. Furphy & Sons, a company owned by Furphy's brother John.

== Works ==
A Christmas Hymn 1915 by Arthur Chanter (1866–1950)
1915 musical setting of lines by Joseph Furphy by Arthur Chanter

- Such Is Life (1903)
- Furphy, Joseph (1916). Baker, Kate (ed.). The Poems of Joseph Furphy (PDF). Melbourne & Sydney: Lothian Book Publishing Co. Pty. Ltd. – via University of Sydney Library.
- Rigby's Romance (1921)
- The Buln Buln and the Brolga (1946)
- Various articles in periodicals (Joseph Furphy: An Annotated Checklist of Items in Periodicals)
- Christmas Hymn to music composed by Australian composer Arthur Chanter
