= Our Rural Magazine =

Western Australian journal (1926–1946)

- Frequency: Monthly
- Publisher: Department of Education, Western Australia
- Founded: 1926
- Final issue: 1946
- Country: Australia
- Based in: Perth

Our Rural Magazine was a monthly magazine produced between 1926 and 1946 by the WA Correspondence School of the Education Department of Western Australia for school children who were located in isolated circumstances. In the inter-war period, many isolated rural localities did not have primary schools, and the students were required to have their education by correspondence.

The magazine was based in Perth. It was operated by the Education Department, with writers such as James Pollard and John K. Ewers. Heads of various institutions wrote on topics related to their position; in the September 1933 edition the Government Botanist C.A.Gardner wrote an article, and the curator of the museum Ludwig Glauert conducted a correspondence column.

Senior community leaders made encouraging messages to the isolated students, such as this one from Field Marshal Sir William Birdwood:

I earnestly advise you to take full advantage of the educational correspondence classes that are open to you and by which my two grand-daughters have started their education. Be guided by the help and valuable instruction to be derived from 'Our Rural Magazine' and do not forget that the country districts, handicapped as their people may be in many respects, have been responsible for many of the most able leaders in the public life of Australia.

== See also ==
- School of the Air
