= Alice Springs School of the Air =

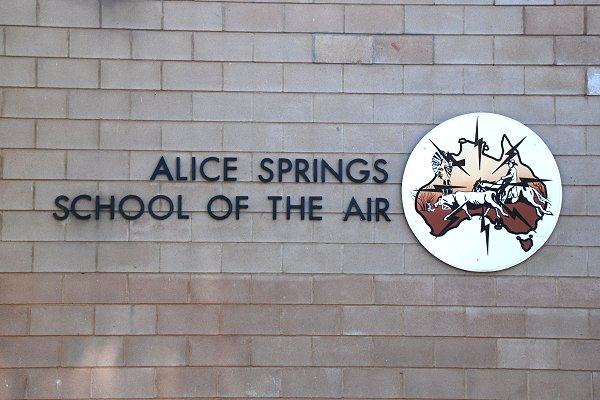
Signage Alice Springs School of the Air

The Alice Springs School of the Air is a distance education organization based in Alice Springs which provides teaching, education materials and personal communication for remote children in the Northern Territory outback of Australia.

== Historical background ==
Alice Springs is in the centre of Australia. It is one of several remote centers throughout 'outback' Australia. The area consists of small and isolated communities and cattle stations, for which normal services don’t exist and education services and medical assistance in emergencies has always been a problem. In the first part of the 20th century a Uniting Church pastor, The Rev John Flynn, set up his "mantle of Safety" consisting of airplanes, hospitals and radios to address the lack of medical help. This extensive network of radios became the platform on which the School of the Air was initially built.

Education for people in remote areas from the 1920s was carried out by correspondence, in particular, through the South Australian Correspondence School. There was and still is a historical connection between the Northern Territory and South Australia because South Australia administered the NT from the 1870s until 1911.

The idea for the School of the Air came from a South Australian School Inspector called Adelaide Miethkel who travelled to Alice Springs in 1944 as a member of the Council of the Flying Doctor Service. On a trip to remote cattle stations during this time with local teacher Les Dodd she recognized the difficulties outback families were facing with correspondence lessons, and that children were lacking in social contact. It occurred to her at the time that radio could provide a community aspect to the education of children in the bush. She later heard about a nurse who gave a health presentation to outback women over the FDS radio. It occurred to Miethke that if a nurse could give a presentation over the radio to outback women then a teacher could give lessons over the radio to the children of the outback and that this might assist in breaking down their social isolation.

In 1950 she approached John Flynn seeking permission to run a trial over the RFDS radio of a "School of the Air". This trial was successful and the first School of the Air was officially opened on 8 June 1951.

== Early years ==
Originally there were only three half-hour lessons per week. There was no two-way transmission and therefore no opportunity for students to interact with the teacher. The first teacher was Mr Kissell of the Alice Springs Higher Primary School who was the leader of the broadcast team. Teachers took turns to present specially scripted and rehearsed scripts to outback children with the help of the radio staff at the Flying Doctor base.

Initially, lessons were broadcast only but soon a question and answer time was added at the end of each broadcast. The initial broadcasts were from the Hartley Street School with the signal carried from the school to the FDS building by telephone line and from there via the aerials of the FDS to the children in the bush.

== Development ==
In 1953 Molly Ferguson was appointed as the leader of the broadcasting team.

The School of the Air moved to a specially built broadcast studio at the new Anzac Hill High School in 1954. This new facility had an observation area for visitors. Ferguson became the sole teacher of the School of the Air during that year. In 1955 she organized the first "get together" of Students of the School of the Air at the Alice Springs Higher Primary School. The 30 children ranged in age from 5 to 15 years of age. Molly was awarded the MBE for her work with the School of the Air in that year and retired to get married.

Margaret Stiller was the new School of the Air Teacher in 1956. During this year 2 extra radio sessions were added to help the secondary students and the school library began with books posted out to students. Stiller took students with 4 other adults to Adelaide for 3 weeks in 1958 for the first excursion for ASSOA students. Nancy Barrett was employed after Stiller retired due to ill health in 1960. It was her idea to visit all the students at their stations and was away for a week at a time. These trips became known as "patrols". She used her own car initially but the visits were deemed so successful that the Government provided vehicles from its pool and expenses for future patrols. David Ashton, who was appointed in 1967, continued and extended the patrols to 1–2 weeks 4 times per year.

In 1968 the School of the Air was moved to a demountable at the Flying Doctor base in Stuart Terrace and a second teacher, Mrs Judy Hodder, was employed to take the younger children and provide relief for the teacher on patrol. At this time students were still using materials from the South Australian Correspondence School with work being received from there and returned there for marking.

Alice Springs School of the Air became completely autonomous from the South Australian Correspondence School in 1974 and became the Correspondence school for Central Australia. All families with enrolled children were given transceivers at this time and the school had its own radio frequencies. Correspondence work was sent out to the students and marked and returned to students from Alice Springs. By this time there were enough students to have a teacher for each class. Patrols were made by teachers to each of their students once a year. David Ashton, who was the Principal of the school from 1974, organized the first supervisor’s conference that year which was attended by 25 supervisors. Val Whalen, a teacher and librarian at the school, designed the school logo in 1975.

Patrols went aerial in 1976 when teachers used planes for patrols for the first time. By 1991 a quarter of all patrols were by air. The school moved to its current location at Head Street, Alice Springs in 1977 although teachers still had to travel to the, now, Royal Flying Doctor Service (RFDS) to actually broadcast the lessons. The official opening of the premises occurred the following year and radio broadcasts were then made from a specially built studio. By 1978 there were 13 teachers at the school and 3 administration staff. The school was issued with its first dedicated patrol vehicle, a 4WD Toyota Landcruiser, in 1979. The following year a mobile library service was instigated but discontinued shortly afterwards as it was not deemed viable.

The first "in School" week where students came together in Alice Springs for a week, was held in 1985. This was organized by Mrs Eileen Kennedy for her year three class. It was so successful that it has become an annual event for all classes. 1991 was the 40th anniversary of the school. Artist Christopher Brocklebank became an artist in residence for the year.

1992 was a busy year with a trial of satellite television via Imparja, the local Television Station, and Toshiba laptops trialled for the senior classes. A trial program was held for Indigenous children. A major radio upgrade was commenced and under the principal, Mr Ed Boyd, Communications technology became a major focus for the future. New technology in the form of Quick-mail, new phones and facsimile were installed in 1993 and four computers were made available for students in years 6 and 7. The march of technology continued with Mr Tony Richards employed in 1999 to set up internet access, email and web services (MOASS) to School of the Air families and email became an important communications tool especially for older students.

In 2000 the Alice Springs School of the Air intranet went online. Christopher Brocklebank was again artist in residence for the 50th birthday celebrations in 2001. The 50th Birthday Mural was officially publicized. In 2002 the first rollout began of Interactive Distance Learning (IDL) using satellite and broadband technologies. Between 2003 and 2005 the IDL Studio was built and radio lessons phased out as IDL classes via broadband and satellite internet were phased in. By 2006 the school was completely converted to satellite technology to conduct classes and in 2008 the former radio studio was transformed into a second IDL studio.

== Visitor Centre ==
A new extension to the Head Street Premises was completed in 1995 which provided a new visitor centre, a larger teacher preparation area and more storage space. The new Visitor Centre was officially opened in 1996. The Visitor Centre provides information and raises funds for the School of the Air.

== Notable events ==
Prince Charles and Lady Diana visited the school and spoke to the children over the radio in 1983.

1988 was Australia’s bicentennial year and the Bicentennial Quilt was made to commemorate the event. Margaret Thatcher visited the school that year.

In the year 2000, there was a visit to ASSOA from Queen Elizabeth II.
