= Arthur Chanter =

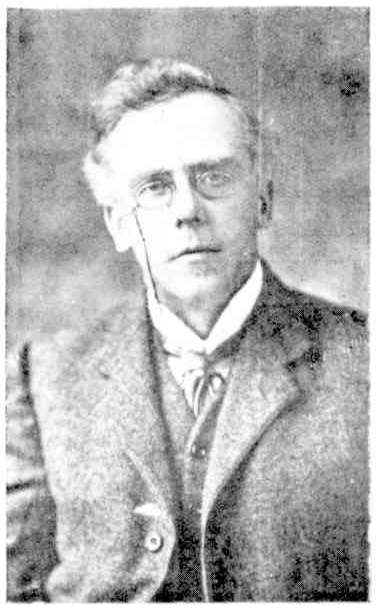
- Arthur Chanter 1910

Background information
- Born: January 1, 1866; Melbourne, Victoria, Australia
- Died: November 29, 1950 (aged 84)
- Occupations: Composer, conductor, teacher
- Years active: 1889–1950

Arthur Maybee Chanter (1866-1950) was an Australian composer, conductor, music teacher, choir master and musician. An accomplished pianist and watercolorist, Chanter was among the earliest music graduates of the University of Melbourne, where he was instructed by George Marshall-Hall. In 1910 Chanter was the adjudicator of a musical Eistedfodd and band competition of an association of native-born Australians in Western Australia. He married Josephine in 1902 but divorced her in 1914, taking another wife Sara Kate Campbell in 1915. He lived mostly in Brighton, Victoria and Elsternwick, but was well travelled. He advocated recording as a means to reach the working clubs and masses and was damning of the teaching methods in public schools. He retired to Euroa and died 28 November 1950, and is buried in Cheltenham pioneer cemetery.

== Works ==
A Christmas Hymn 1915 setting of Joseph Furphy

- 1898 The Vintner's Daughter or The Vintner of Wurgburg, an opera in four acts
- 1900 Chaucer Songs
- 1901 Saltwater Jack
- 1910 Valse triste : pianoforte solo
- 1911 A Daughter of Italy, an opera
- 1912 Snow clouds : song for soprano with lyrics by Catherine Cue-Campbell
- 1913 Australians all : national song and anthem / words by William Carrington
- 1914 Australia my beloved land
- 1915 Christmas hymn
- 1930 Sorrento : one act comic opera
- 1930 Sun of my soul : hymn anthem
- There's a woman like a dewdrop : serenade from Browning's
- The buccaneer for bass voice
- O worship the Lord for choir
- The bountiful harvest
- Take, Oh Take those lips away (from Measure for Measure by Shakespeare)
