= Victor Kennedy =

Australian writer and journalist

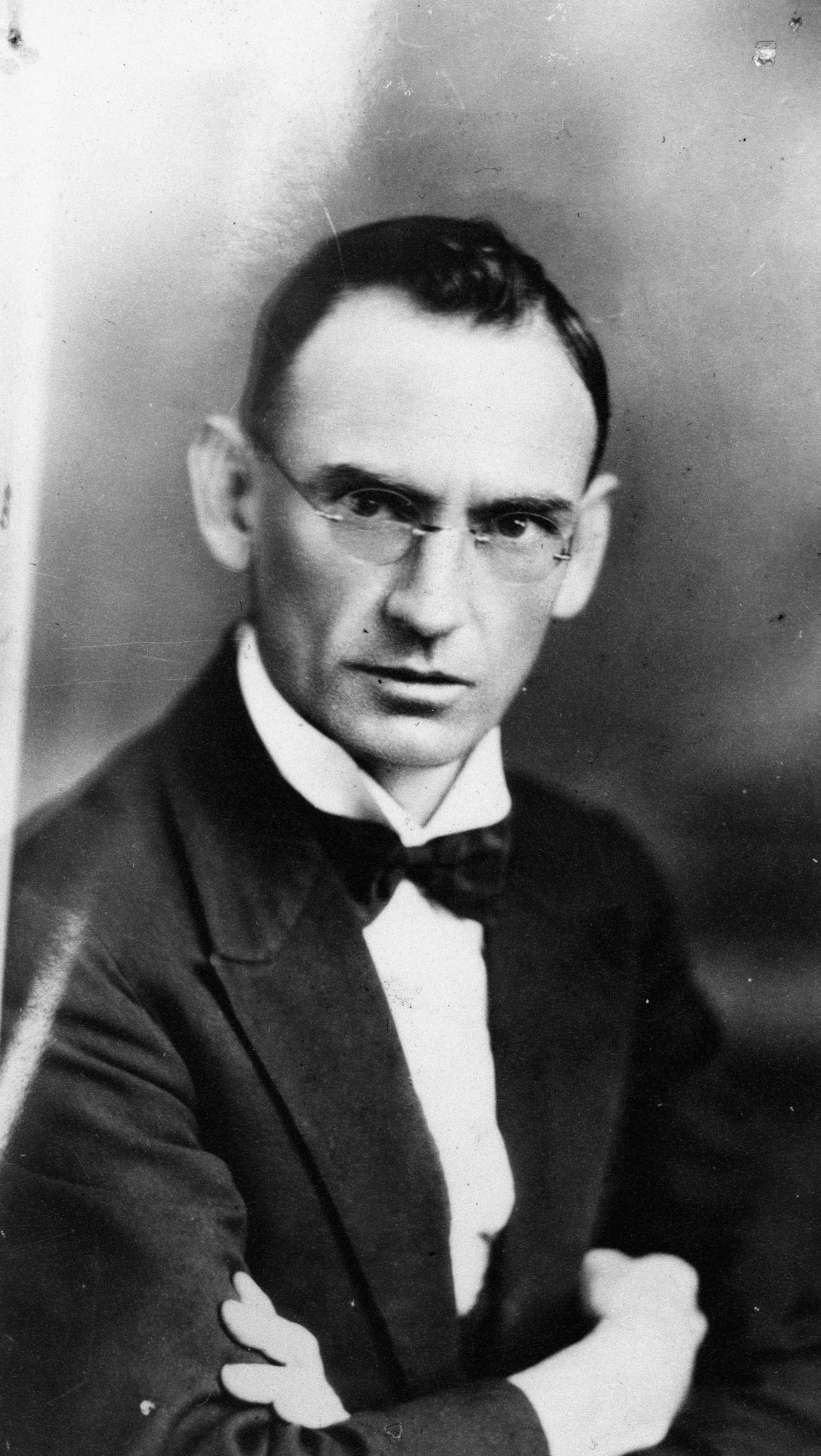
- Born: Martin Victor Kennedy; 11 August 1895; Eaglehawk, Victoria
- Died: 14 January 1952 (aged 56); South Melbourne, Australia
- Occupations: Writer and journalist
- Known for: President of the Australian Literature Society

Martin Victor Kennedy (1895–1952), known widely as Victor Kennedy, was an author, journalist and significant figure in Australian literature. Born in Eaglehawk near Bendigo on 11 August 1895 to Martin William and Mary Jane Kennedy (née Turner). Kennedy was a journalist for the Shepparton Advertiser, after which he wrote for the Geraldton Guardian before becoming editor at the Geraldton Express. He later moved to Queensland from 1926 to 1942 where he founded the literary periodical Northern Affairs. A member of the Bread and Cheese Club, he was also president of the Australian Literature Society and Associate General Editor of the Jindyworobak Club. He started a biography of Bernard O'Dowd, unfinished at his death but completed by writer Nettie Palmer.

== See also ==
- Australian literature
