= Victorian Review (Australia) =

The Victorian Review originally subtitled A journal of the Volunteer Force was a weekly magazine produced in Melbourne, Australia, and ran for a few months from December 1860, aimed directly at civil servants and the colonies' defence personnel, but much of its reporting was on arts and artists. The title was revived in 1879 for a monthly magazine. A companion weekly, The Federal Australian ran from 1881; both failed in 1886, largely due to mismanagement.

== History ==
The Victorian Review began as a weekly magazine for the voluntary militia and public servants, largely modelled on the Army and Navy Gazette. Although a Melbourne-based publication, it included much of direct interest to the South Australian militia. It shared offices with Melbourne Punch, and editor of both papers was James Smith (1820–1910). Rather than being operated by steam, the press was powered by water pressure from the Yan Yean reservoir. The first issue appeared in late December 1860, and the last issue for which a published notice is evident was that of March 1861, though newsagents' advertisements continued to mention the title into 1862.

The title was revived as a monthly magazine in November 1879 by H. Mortimer Franklyn, an American huckster of dubious editorial and journalistic ability but considerable panache. He persuaded Herbert J. Henty (1834–1902), brother and attorney of wealthy Henry Henty (1833–1912) into bankrolling the enterprise. Contributors to the first number included Franklyn, Dr. Hearn, Murray Smith, David Blair, W. Jardine Smith, Marcus Clarke, James Hingston and James Smith (editor of the earlier "Review"). It also published serialized fiction by R. E. Francillon and others. The magazine published essays emanating from the Melbourne Shakespeare Society.

Herbert J. Henty and H. Mortimer Franklyn lost a great deal of money (mostly Henry Henty's) in the enterprise.

With its demise, The Adelaide University Shakespeare Society, which had also used the Review to publish many of its research papers, began its own occasional publication University Shakespeare Journal.
