= Alice Henry =

Australian suffragist, journalist and trade unionist

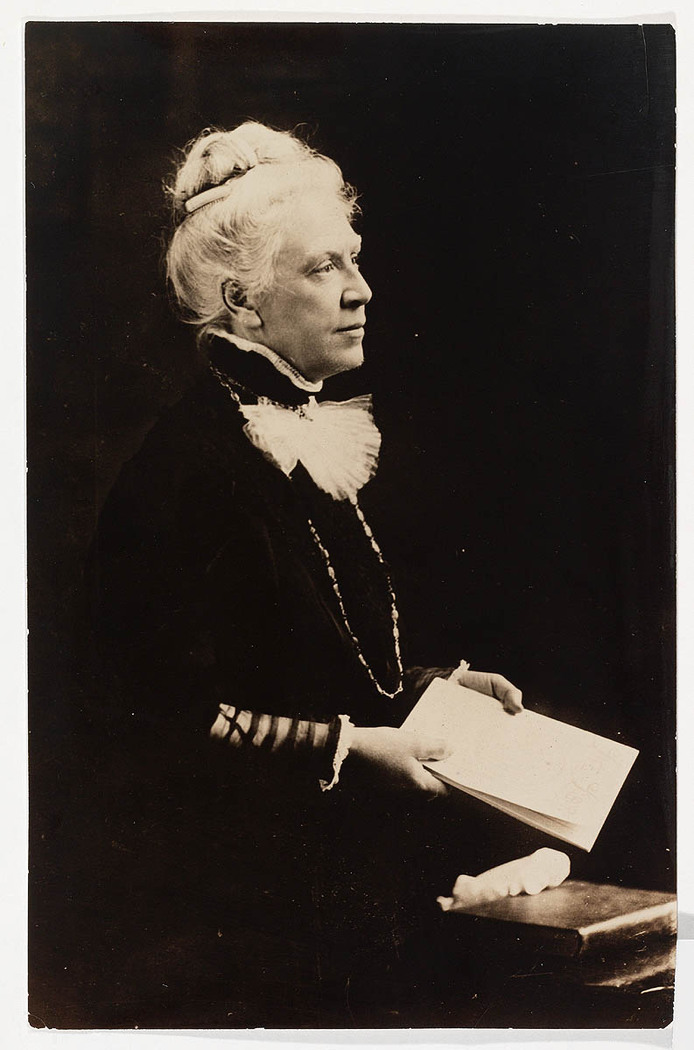
- Born: 21 March 1857; Melbourne, Colony of Victoria
- Died: 14 February 1943 (aged 85); Malvern, Victoria, Australia
- Other names: A.L.F.; Wyuna; Pomona
- Occupations: Journalist, social activist, suffragist

Alice Henry (21 March 1857 – 14 February 1943) was an Australian suffragist, journalist and trade unionist who also became prominent in the American trade union movement as a member of the Women's Trade Union League.

Henry Street in the Canberra suburb of Cook is named in her honour.

== Early life ==
Henry was born on 21 March 1857 in Richmond, Melbourne. She was the daughter of Charles Ferguson Henry, an accountant and his wife Margaret (née Walker), a garment worker. She had one brother, Alfred, who was born in 1859. Both of her parents were Scottish and moved to Australia in 1853. She attended several schools in Melbourne, eventually matriculating with credit from Richard Hale Budd's Educational Institute for Ladies in 1874.

== Career ==
After completing high school, Henry taught briefly and eventually became a featured reporter for The Melbourne Argus and the Australian. Her journalism mainly focused on progressive causes such as labour reform, disabled children and proportional representation. She also became involved with Australian politics in the 1890s, and began to lecture on topics such as women's rights, suffrage and labour. She became closely associated with the progressive movement in Melbourne. Henry moved to the United States from Australia in 1906 and became office secretary of the Women's Trade Union League in Chicago. While working for the Women's Trade Union League she became prominent in the fight for women's suffrage, union organisation and labour rights. She served a variety of jobs within the union including field organiser and director of the education department.

Henry remained involved in writing during her time in America. She edited the women's section of the Chicago Union Labor Advocate and was the founding editor of the Women's Trade Union League's Life and Labor periodical until 1915. Henry also wrote two books, The Trade Union Woman (1915) and Women and the Labor Movement (1923). Both of these books focus on the particular struggles and inequalities working-class women faced during this time period.

== Suffrage and the Women's Trade Union League ==
The Women's Trade Union League (WTUL) was established in 1903 and consisted of reformers seeking to combine trade unionism and feminism to create a new force towards the obstacles women faced when organising women into unions. In Henry's 1915 essay "A Separate Piece" published in The Trade Union Woman she discussed some of the problems associated with organising. One of the issues she addressed was the tension between middle-class reformers of the WTUL and the working-class women. A possible solution that she advocated was the establishment of separate women's locals.

Henry's background with Fabian socialism, as well as her knowledge of Australian labour legislation and woman suffrage attracted the attention of Margaret Dreier Robins, a prominent reformer of the time. Henry was invited by Robins to work for the National Women's Trade Union League of America in Chicago as a lecturer and field-worker. As a field worker Henry organised new branches, and as a journalist she became a key figure and voice in the campaign for 'woman suffrage, union organisation, vocational education, and labour legislation.'

Between 1907 and 1925 Henry served as an editor, publicist and lecturer for the WTUL. Henry played an active role in mobilising both the middle class as well as trade union support for the League's legislative, educational and organizational goals. As an activist she participated in many clubs such as the Melbourne Shakespeare Society, was secretary of the Women Writer's Club, lectured and frequently at women's organisations (like the Prahran and Kew Progressive League). Alice also served as an advisory member on committees set up by the National Council of Women and the Victorian Women's Federation. She was not a leader or organiser of the women's movement; she worked as a prominent publicist within it. Life and Labor was the journal of the National Women Trade Union League. It was published in Chicago and effectively promoted women's suffrage.

On 19 May 1911 a suffrage meeting was held at The Pfister Hotel club room, there Henry urged that the best ways to obtain result was to carry out a campaign along intensive lines. There she advocated for street meetings to create interest in the suffrage cause. Henry said,

"Many persons will stop to listen at a street meeting who would not come to a suffrage meeting...The talks should be short about five minutes for those who are attracted will only pause for a few moments and a long speech would be lost on them. Any ready speaker would do." Henry had the ability to captivate American audiences when she spoke due to her conviction and energy she exuded. Henry saw current legislation and policy as not helping. "I do not feel that the vote is any sort of advance for women. If you give suffrage to men and not women you are putting women on a relatively lower plane. Society will go backward if women don't get to vote."

Through her own personal experience in Australia she said that women's suffrage there had resulted in a more positive shift in attitudes toward women in the industry. She cited that wages and factory conditions have improved and that in general industries had become more humanised. Henry did admit that the women had not been the only factor in these changes but that the increased power in women had a materially role in aiding these changes.

== Later life and legacy ==
Henry retired to Santa Barbara, California in 1928 after completing a lecture and investigation tour in Britain. After suffering financially during the Great Depression, Henry returned to Australia in 1933. She continued her work later in life, and compiled a bibliography of Australian woman writers in 1937. Henry died on 14 February 1943 in a hospital in Melbourne.

Throughout her life Henry was passionate about feminism and the equal rights of women. Her passion for the emancipation and equality of women is her main legacy, as she devoted much of her life and writing towards that cause. Her two books The Trade Union Woman and Women and the Labor Movement offer insight into the lives of working-class women involved in progressive movements in the early twentieth century.
