= John Furphy =

Australian blacksmith (1842–1920)

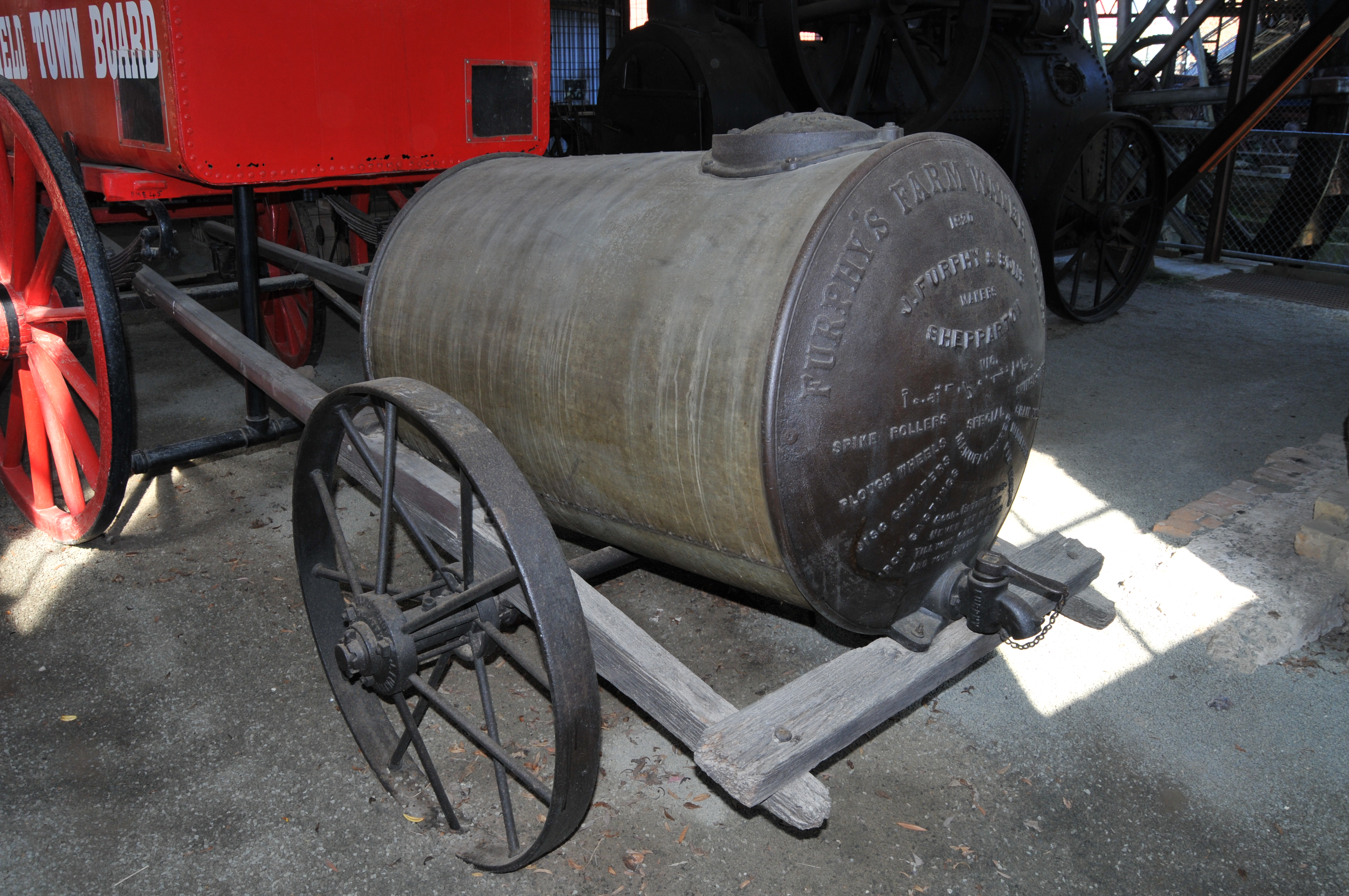
One of Furphy's farm water carts

John Furphy (17 June 1842 – 23 September 1920) was an Australian blacksmith credited with inventing the "furphy", a water cart that was used by the Australian army during the first World War.

== Early life ==
Furphy was born on 17 June 1842 in Moonee Ponds, Colony of New South Wales, the eldest son of farmer Samuel Furphy and dressmaker Judith (née Hare), both of whom were Irish immigrants. Initially home-schooled, Furphy later attended public schools in Kangaroo Ground and Kyneton. His younger brother was the author Joseph Furphy, best known for the Australian novel Such is Life.

== Career ==
Furphy first found employment at the Kyneton-based farm machinery manufacturer Hutcheson & Walker, before becoming an independent blacksmith in 1864. Moving to nearby Shepparton in 1873, he established the first blacksmith's shop in the township, gradually expanding into iron works. By 1888, Furphy had the most extensive foundry in northern Victoria. His patented grain stripper, which preceded the combine harvester, was awarded the first prize at the 1884 Grand National Show. His agricultural machinery, including a grain stripper, a furrow plough and iron swingletrees, were likewise acclaimed at the International Exhibition from 1888 to 1889.

Furphy's most recognised agricultural product was the "Furphy Farm Water Cart", a water cart with a 818 litres (180 imp gal; 216 US gal) cylindrical tank made of iron, placed in a wooden frame on cast-iron wheels and horizontally mounted to be harnessed by a horse. Annual production of the water carts averaged 300 per year and peaked during World War I when used in large numbers by the Australian Army.

The term "furphy" also became slang for gossip, likely connected to the Furphy water carts although its exact origin is unclear.

== Personal life and death ==
Furphy was a devout Christian who offered lay-preaching to Methodist congregations at Tullygaroopna, Shepparton and the surrounding district. To the list of foundry products inscribed on the cast-iron back plates of his water carts, Furphy added a temperance message in shorthand. He married Sarah Ann (née Vaughan) on 25 May 1866. They had nine children. His brother Joseph Furphy became known as one of Australia's pioneer novelists. Furphy spent his final years in Melbourne, where he had relocated to in 1909. He died on 23 September 1920. The Furphy Foundry is still operated by his descendants.
