= Furphy =

Australian colloquialism for usually false rumour or gossip

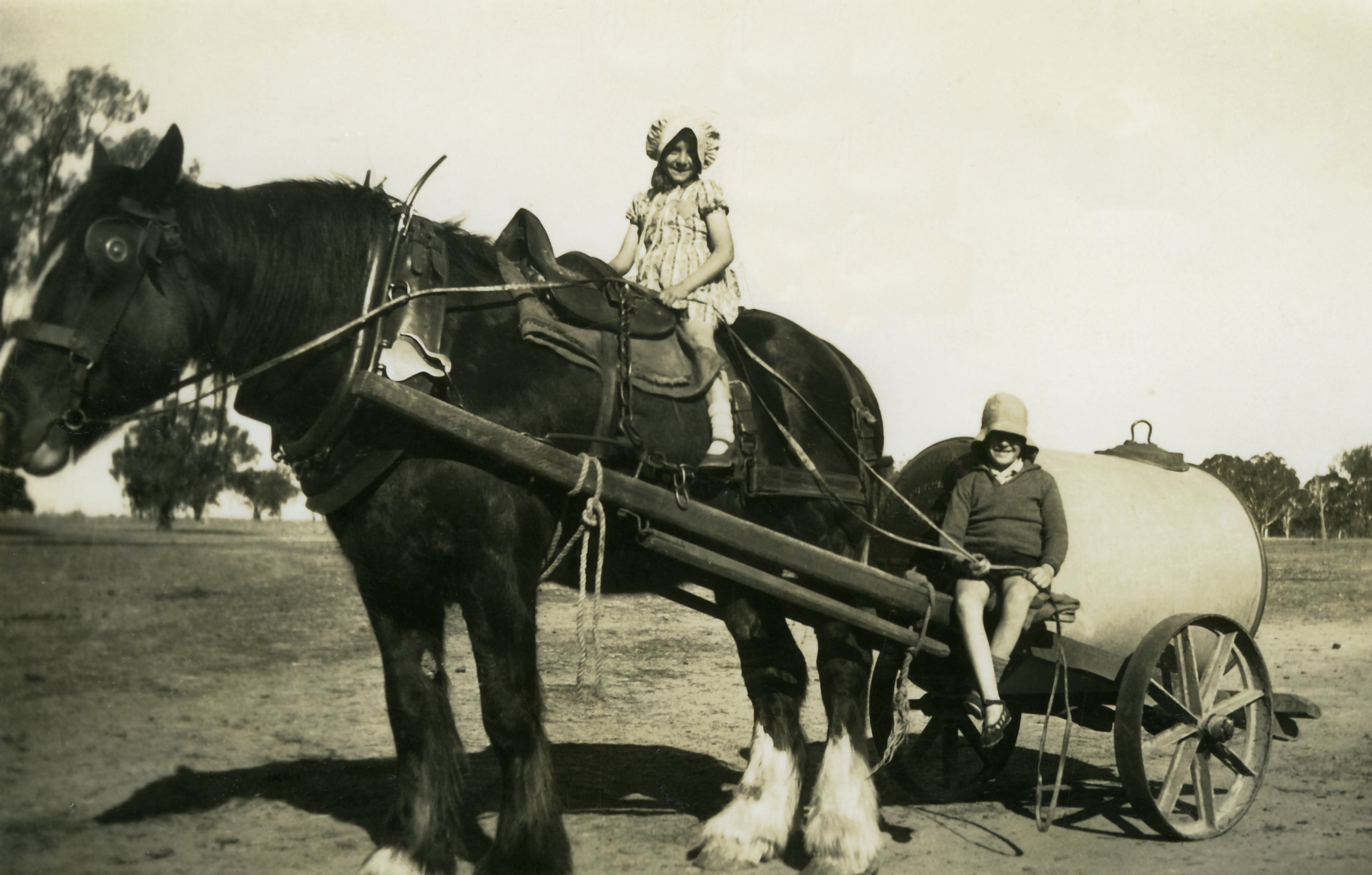
Furphy hitched to an Australian Draught horse

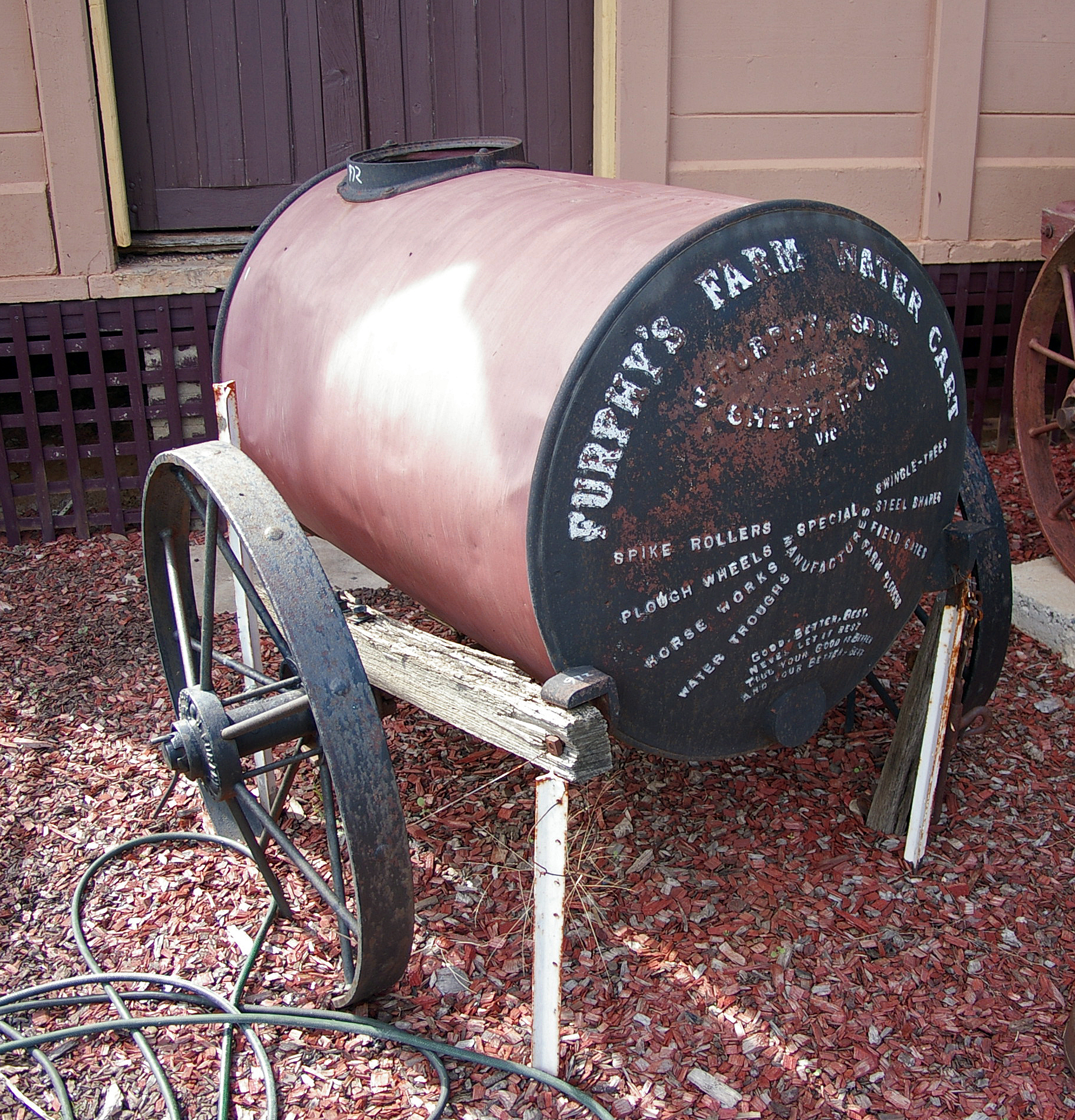
A Furphy farm water cart

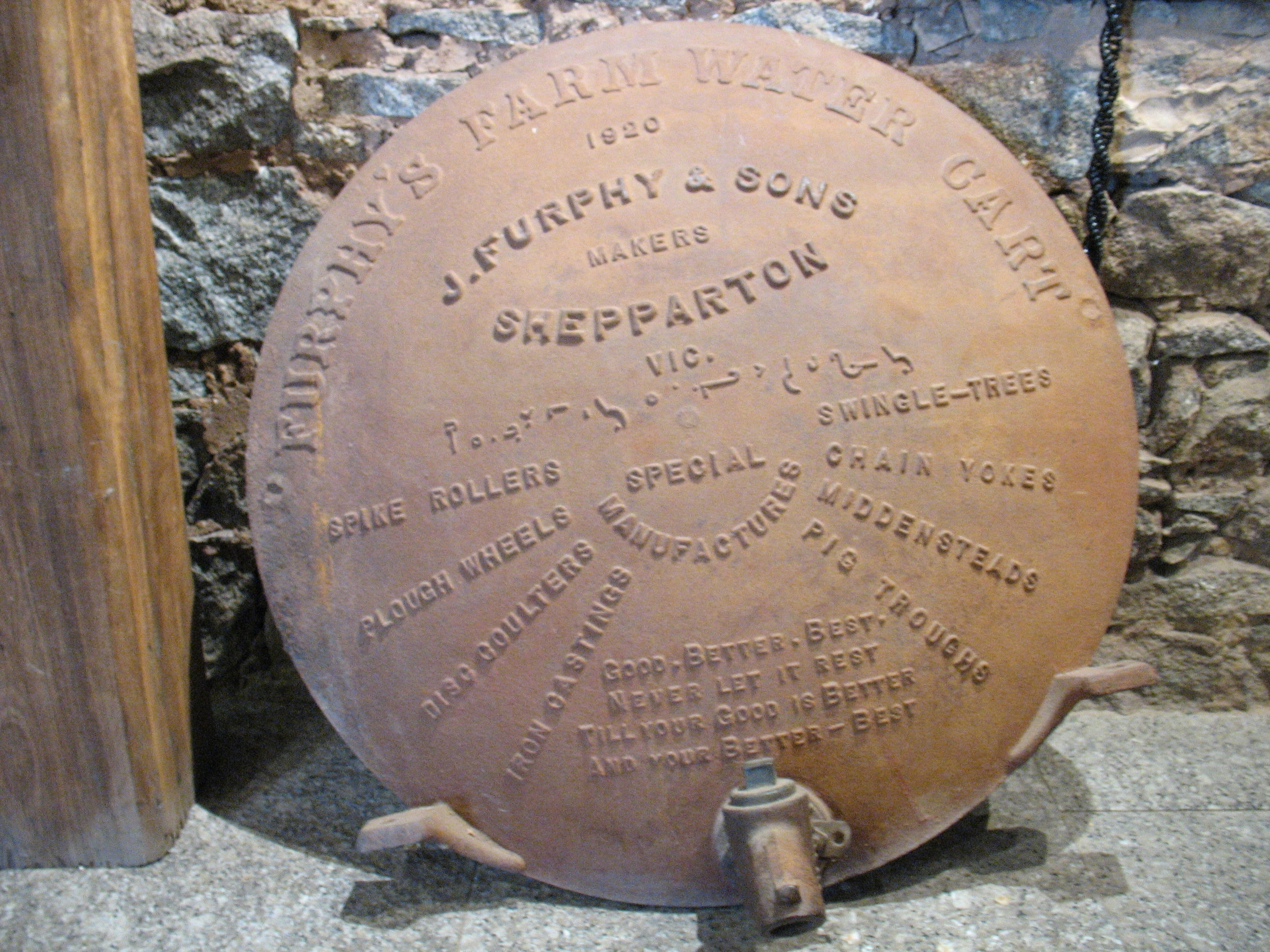
Back plate of a Furphy farm water cart

The word "furphy" is Australian slang for an erroneous or improbable story that is claimed to be factual. Furphies are supposedly heard from reputable sources, sometimes second-hand or third-hand, and widely believed until discounted.

== Origins ==
In recent years, the word has been said to derive from water carts designed and made by a company established by John Furphy of J. Furphy & Sons of Shepparton, Victoria. The steel and cast iron tanks were first made in the 1880s and were used on farms and by stock agents. Many Furphy water carts were used to take water to Australian Army personnel during World War I in Australia, Europe and the Middle East.

Because these water carts were placed where people gathered and talked, the story goes, suspiciously just like an American office watercooler, a "furphy" became the name for the sort of chatter that circulated by the Furphy tank (see the similar meaning and derivation of the term scuttlebutt).

However, this story is itself most likely a furphy.

In his book Memories of a Signaller, Harold Hinckfuss wrote of the "furphies" or rumours of pending movements of troops, while awaiting transfer to the French lines from Egypt. His account claims that the association of "furphy" with the latrines is not due to any association of toilets with drinking water beside a cart, but because a "furphy" was a term for a fart: "Every day in the tent someone would come up with a 'furphy' that he had heard whilst down at the latrines. That is why the different stories were called furphies ('furphy' was the term used for a fart)."

H. G. Hartnett, used and credited as a source by official historian C. E. W. Bean in his 12 volume Official History of Australia in the War of 1914–1918 (e.g. mentioned by name in vol. IV, p. 836), is more precise and detailed about the origin of the term, which

- contradicts the much later "watercart" story,
- corresponds with Australian culture rather than American, and
- corresponds with Hinckfuss's recollection of its alternate meaning:

It is doubtful if there ever was a more fruitful field for rumours than the army. No one knew where they emanated from. Scanty scraps of information, often reported to have been told initially in the strictest confidence, were distorted, magnified, losing nothing in the constant retelling; instead, they often branched out into new avenues as they were passed on.

Although generally treated with scant respect, these tales—"Latrine Wireless News" and "Furphies"—quite often did contain an element of truth. Those repeating them apologetically indicated that what they told was "according to rumour".

The term "Furphy" is said to have originated in the Broadmeadows Camp, Melbourne, in 1914. The garbage and refuse of the camp was collected in carts, somewhat resembling present day municipal council garbage trucks, each of which had the maker's name, "FURPHY", painted in large letters on both sides of the vehicle. Rumours in the camp were passed on direct from a "Furphy" and, in due course, "Furphy" was adopted as the "official" title for all rumours right throughout the AIF.^{(emphasis added)}

As he then continues: "It was, therefore, not surprising that the 'Latrine Wireless' in the Old Belgian Cavalry Barracks spread the news around that the 2nd Battalion was going right back for another long spell. At the time most of us did not take it seriously. Nevertheless, the battalion did march out of Ypres next morning, 11 November [1917]".

Hartnett wrote in a bowdlerised fashion suitable for polite company of the 1920s, so his otherwise-tautological separate specification of "refuse" was actually the then-common euphemism for night soil, further connecting the Furphy carts to (the odour of) the latrines.

== See also ==
- Scuttlebutt
