= Such Is Life (novel) =

Novel by Joseph Furphy

Such Is Life: Being Certain Extracts From The Diary of Tom Collins
- Title page for Such Is Life: Being Certain Extracts From The Diary of Tom Collins (1937 edition)
- Author: Joseph Furphy
- Language: English
- Genre: Novel
- Publication date: 1 August 1903
- Publication place: Australia

Such Is Life: Being Certain Extracts From The Diary of Tom Collins is a novel by Australian author Joseph Furphy, written in 1897 and published in 1903. It is a fictional account of rural dwellers, including bullock drivers, squatters and swagmen, in southern New South Wales and northern Victoria, during the 1880s.

The title of Such is Life was derived from bushranger and outlaw Ned Kelly's supposed last words before being executed. In his self-introduction to J. F. Archibald, founder and editor of The Bulletin, Furphy famously described the novel as follows: "Temper, democratic; bias, offensively Australian."

== Synopsis ==
The book gives the impression of being a series of loosely interwoven stories of the various people encountered by the narrator as he travels about the countryside. The people he meets round campfires pass on news and gossip and tell stories, so that sometimes the reader can infer information by putting these second hand stories together with the action of the narrative. At times the prose may be difficult for some modern readers to understand because of the use of Australian vernacular and the attempt to convey the accents of Scottish and Chinese personalities.

The novel's title is said to be derived from bushranger and outlaw Ned Kelly's possibly apocryphal last words, supposed to have been said on the scaffold as he was about to be hanged. The book is full of mordant irony from start to finish, not least from the contrast between the narration and the action—the narrator at times employing extremely high blown language (and displaying Furphy's almost freakish degree of book-learning) in humorous contrast to the extremely low characters and mundane events he is describing. Furphy employs both pathos and bathos and the narration teases the reader with its tangents, like a shaggy dog story. (The pseudonym 'Tom Collins' is slang for a tall story.) There are hidden substories, and the narrator sometimes gets hold of the wrong end of the stick in untangling them, but the reader can nut them out. Subjects which occur in the book but are not spoken of directly include: foul language; nakedness and undergarments; passing as the opposite sex; homosexuality among bullock drivers; effeminacy; mutilation; and murder. At the same time the great joy of the novel is its realism: Furphy is able to capture the flavour of interaction between the bush characters he meets, their way of talking, the physical landscape, the feel of a nomad's life. The 19th century US novelist he is most similar in approach to is Mark Twain. With its use of a digressive, unreliable narrator, Furphy's method in Such Is Life can be compared with that of his Brazilian contemporary Machado de Assis.

== Legacy ==
Such is Life has been described as Australia’s Moby-Dick because, like Herman Melville's book, it was neglected for thirty or forty years before being discovered as a classic.
