= 1867 in Australian literature =

This article presents a list of the historical events and publications of Australian literature during 1867.

== Books ==
- Charles de Boos – Fifty Years Ago : An Australian Tale
- Maud Jeanne Franc – Golden Gifts : An Australian Tale
- Catherine Helen Spence – The Author's Daughter (aka Hugh Lindsay's Guest)

== Short stories ==
- Mary Fortune
  - "The Illumined Grave"
  - "The White Maniac : A Doctor's Tale"
- Henry Kingsley – "The Two Cadets"

== Poetry ==
- Adam Lindsay Gordon
  - Ashtaroth : A Dramatic Lyric
  - Sea Spray and Smoke Drift
- Charles Harpur – "Obituary Lines"
- Henry Kendall
  - "Bell-Birds"
  - "September in Australia"
  - "The Warrigal"
- Clarinda Parkes – Poems

== Births ==
A list, ordered by date of birth (and, if the date is either unspecified or repeated, ordered alphabetically by surname) of births in 1867 of Australian literary figures, authors of written works or literature-related individuals follows, including year of death.

- 24 February – Jennings Carmichael, poet (died 1904)
- 2 March — Louis Lavater, composer and author (died 1953)
- 17 June – Henry Lawson, poet and short story writer (died 1922)
- 21 August – Lilian Turner, novelist (died 1956)
- 13 October – Guy Boothby, novelist (died 1905)
- 26 November – Roderic Quinn, poet and short story writer (died 1949)

== Deaths ==
A list, ordered by date of death (and, if the date is either unspecified or repeated, ordered alphabetically by surname) of deaths in 1867 of Australian literary figures, authors of written works or literature-related individuals follows, including year of birth.

Unknown date

- Charlotte Barton, author of Australia's earliest known children's book (born 1797)

== See also ==
- 1867 in Australia
- 1867 in literature
- 1867 in poetry
- List of years in Australian literature
- List of years in literature
