= A Storm in the Mountains =

Poem by Australian writer Charles Harpur

- by Charles Harpur
- Written: 1856
- First published in: The Empire
- Country: Australia
- Language: English

Full text
- A Storm in the Mountains at Wikisource

"A Storm in the Mountains" (1856) is a poem by Australian poet Charles Harpur.

The poem was originally published in The Empire on 15 July 1856 and subsequently reprinted in the author's major collections as well as other poetry anthologies. It is also known under the title "A Storm on the Mountains".

== Critical reception ==
While reviewing Harpur's Poems in 1883 a writer in the Adelaide Observer observed that while "Charles Harpur had not the dash and verve of Gordon, the rich vein of humour of Brunton Stephens, or such accurate and vivid descriptive powers as Kendall but still there is much ... that touches the heart and the imagination." They went on: "we seem to see the scenes, to hear the sounds, to watch the movements he describes."

Michael Ackland, writing about the sublimity of the poem, noted that its "concern with the interplay of natural, mental and supernatural elements is raised in purely physical terms through the employment of surrogate figures to express man's imminent peril. Nature provides the raw materials of elemental force and victim, but it is cognitive intelligence which discerns in events the sublime of terror, and their relevance to our social and spiritual preoccupations." He concluded "Charles Harpur turned depiction of the Australian countryside into an occasion for humane and religious meditation. In his works, landscape becomes instinct with spiritual purpose, and ordinary, honest folk the heroes of elemental encounters projected on an epic scale."

== Publication history ==
After the poem's initial publication in The Empire it was reprinted as follows:

- Poems by Charles Harpur, George Robertson, 1883
- Australian Ballads and Rhymes : Poems Inspired by Life and Scenery in Australia and New Zealand edited by Douglas Sladen, 1888
- A Century of Australian Song edited by Douglas Sladen (1888)
- Australia’s Writers edited by Graeme Kinross-Smith, Nelson Books, 1980
- A Treasury of Colonial Poetry, Currawong, 1982
- The Poetical Works of Charles Harpur edited by Elizabeth Perkins
- My Country : Australian Poetry and Short Stories, Two Hundred Years edited by Leonie Kramer, Lansdowne, 1985
- A Storm in the Mountains, and, Lost in the Bush by Charles Harpur, Mulini Press, 2006
- An Anthology of Australian Poetry to 1920 edited by John Kinsella, University of Western Australia Library, 2007

== Notes ==
- Harpur gave some explanation for his poem in a manuscript note:

"This is only partially an after-thought — or only an after-thought in the ripeness of its expression, it being founded on the circumstance, that the author, young as he was, and from the very coming on of the storm, became possessed with the feeling that it was for him eventually to make a poem of it, and was thereby led to observe its startling and dangerous manifestations throughout, with a singularly daring attention. And in this way, the conception, which is here elaborated, was crudely stirring within him, I say, even then." (Mitchell Library MS A93)

== See also ==
- 1856 in Australian literature
- 1856 in poetry
