= 1870 in Australian literature =

This article presents a list of the historical events and publications of Australian literature during 1870.

== Books ==
- James Lester Burke — The Adventures of Martin Cash
- Marcus Clarke — For the Term of His Natural Life
- J. R. Houlding — Rural and City Life, or, The Fortunes of the Stubble Family

== Short stories ==
- Marcus Clarke — "Squatters of the Past and Present : 'Arcades Ambo'"
- B. L. Farjeon — "In Australian Wilds"
- Mary Fortune
  - "The Hart Murder"
  - "My Lodger"
  - "The Spider and the Fly"

== Poetry ==
- Mary Hannay Foott — "Ave Caesar! Te Morituri Salutant!"
- Adam Lindsay Gordon
  - Bush Ballads and Galloping Rhymes
  - "The Sick Stockrider"
  - "Thora's Song"
- Henry Kendall
  - "Bush Lyrics : No. II : Camped by the Creek"
  - "The Late A. L. Gordon : In Memoriam"
- Francis MacNamara — "The Ballad of Martin Cash"

== Essays ==
- Henry Kendall — "The Holy Grail"

== Births ==
A list, ordered by date of birth (and, if the date is either unspecified or repeated, ordered alphabetically by surname) of births in 1870 of Australian literary figures, authors of written works or literature-related individuals follows, including year of death.

- 3 January — Henry Handel Richardson, novelist (died 1946)
- 24 January — Ethel Turner, novelist (died 1958)
- 3 February — Beatrice Grimshaw, novelist and travel writer (died 1953)
- 5 June — Jeannie Gunn, novelist (died 1961)
- 18 September — Jane Fletcher, poet, nature writer and children's writer (died 1956)
- 10 October — Louise Mack, poet and WWI war correspondent (died 1935)
- 1 November — Christopher Brennan, poet (died 1932)
- 25 December – S. Elliott Napier, poet (died 1940)

Unknown date

- E. S. Emerson, poet (died 1919)
- Arthur Wright, novelist (died 1932)

== Deaths ==
A list, ordered by date of death (and, if the date is either unspecified or repeated, ordered alphabetically by surname) of deaths in 1870 of Australian literary figures, authors of written works or literature-related individuals follows, including year of birth.

- 24 June — Adam Lindsay Gordon, poet (born 1833)

== See also ==
- 1870 in Australia
- 1870 in literature
- 1870 in poetry
- List of years in Australian literature
- List of years in literature
