= 1856 in Australian literature =

This article presents a list of the historical events and publications of Australian literature during 1856.

== Books ==
- Charles Reade – It Is Never Too Late to Mend

== Poetry ==
- Charles Harpur
  - "Song"
  - "A Storm in the Mountains"
- Henry Parkes — "Fatherland"

== Births ==
A list, ordered by date of birth (and, if the date is either unspecified or repeated, ordered alphabetically by surname) of births in 1856 of Australian literary figures, authors of written works or literature-related individuals follows, including year of death.

- 14 January — J. F. Archibald, journalist and publisher (died 1919)
- 5 February — Douglas Sladen, poet and author (died 1947)
- 21 February — James Chisholm, essayist and short story writer (died 1927)
- 1 May — K. Langloh Parker, author (died 1940)

== See also ==
- 1856 in poetry
- 1856 in literature
- List of years in literature
- List of years in Australian literature
