= The Muse of Australia =

1862 poem by Australian poet Henry Kendall

- by Henry Kendall
- First published in: The Sydney Morning Herald
- Country: Australia
- Language: English
- Publication date: 28 August 1862
- Lines: 16

Full text
- The Poems of Henry Kendall/The Muse of Australia at Wikisource

"The Muse of Australia" (1862) is a poem by Australian poet Henry Kendall.

It was originally published in The Sydney Morning Herald on 28 August 1862 and was subsequently reprinted in the author's single-author collections and a number of Australian poetry anthologies.

== Synopsis ==
In this poem Kendall outlines his desire to be a poet of Australia, and, in order to achieve that, he must seek the muse of the country. This muse has "a glorious face" and holds "the Harp of Australia". In her analysis of Kendall in Preoccupations in Australian Poetry Judith Wright comments that this "muse" is the same figure that "Charles Harpur had met in 'The Dream by the Fountain'; though Kendall laments that the Muse has not descended for him".

== Critical reception ==
In his chapter titled "Kendall's Sublime Melancholy", in Henry Kendall : The Muse of Australia edited by Russell McDougall, Peter Otto notes that "For a poem that seems at first to do little more than repeat such stock Romantic motifs in a colonial setting, what is surprising about 'The Muse of Australia' is just how persistently it emphasises irreconcilable division."

== Publication history ==
After the poem's initial publication in The Sydney Morning Herald in 1862 it was reprinted as follows:

- Poems of Henry Kendall by Henry Kendall, George Robertson, 1886
- A Century of Australian Song edited by Douglas Sladen, Walter Scott Publishers, 1888
- Selected Poems of Henry Kendall edited by T. Inglis Moore, Angus and Robertson, 1957
- The Poetical Works of Henry Kendall edited by Thomas Thornton Reed, 1966
- A Treasury of Colonial Poetry, Currawong, 1982
- Cross-Country : A Book of Australian Verse edited by John Barnes and Brian MacFarlane, Heinemann, 1984
- Henry Kendall: Poetry, Prose and Selected Correspondence edited by Michael Ackland, University of Queensland Press, 1993
- An Australian Treasury of Popular Verse edited by Jim Haynes, ABC Books, 2002

== See also ==
- "The Dream by the Fountain" by Charles Harpur (1843)
- 1862 in Australian literature
- 1862 in poetry
