= A Century of Australian Song =

1888 poetry anthology edited by Douglas Sladen

- Author: Douglas Sladen
- Language: English
- Genre: Poetry anthology
- Publisher: Walter Scott Publishers
- Publication date: 1888
- Publication place: United Kingdom
- Media type: Print
- Pages: 583 pp.

A Century of Australian Song is an anthology of Australian poetry edited by Douglas Sladen, published by Walter Scott Publishers in the United Kingdom in 1888.

The collection contains 145 poems by 66 identified authors (and several by "unknown"), from a variety of sources.

This book is self described as "This volume is an enlarged edition of Australian Ballads and Rhymes (verso of title page.)" That volume, also edited by Douglas Sladen was released in 1888.

The word "Australian" in the book's title should be read as "the colonies of the Australian continent and New Zealand" as writers from all these parts are represented here. Australia was created as a Federation in 1901 and New Zealand as a Dominion in 1907.

== Contents ==
- "Quis Separabit", Douglas Sladen
- "The Sheep Shearers", Francis Adams
- "Spring Morning", Francis Adams
- "The Kangaroo Hunt", Francis Adams
- "Trucanini's Dirge", Alpha Crucis
- "Evening: A Fragment", Emma Frances Anderson
- "An Australian Girl's Farewell", Emma Frances Anderson
- "A Voice from the Bush", Mowbray Morris
- "Fairyland", Mrs James Glenny Wilson
- "A Spring Afternoon, N.Z.", Austral (Mrs James Glenny Wilson)
- "From the Clyde to Braidwood", Australie
- "The Explorer's Message", Australie
- "Melbourne 1843-1904", Patrick Moloney
- "Prologue, Spoken by George Barrington", Henry Carter
- "Forsaken Homes and Graves", Henry Hamilton Blackham
- "When I Am Dead", John Bright
- "Tomboy Madge", Jennings Carmichael
- "The Australian Girl", Ethel Castilla
- "Bess", Alfred Chandler
- "Catching the Coach", Alfred Chandler
- "A Bush Idyl", Alfred Chandler
- "Album Verses (In a Lady's Album)", Marcus Clarke
- "Gippsland Spring Song", N. S. Clerk
- "The Jubilee of Melbourne", J.F. Daniell
- "A Fulfilled Prophecy", Erasmus Darwin
- "Christmas Guests", Mrs Thomas Charles Cloud
- "The Upper Darling", Dugald Ferguson
- "On Visiting the Spot Where Captain Cook, and Sir Joseph Banks, First Landed in Botany Bay", Barron Field
- "The Shepherd's New Year Day", William Anderson Forbes
- Excerpt from "Midas", William Forster
- "The Wind in the She-Oak Tree", Frances Tyrell Gill
- "Beneath the Wattle Boughs", Frances Tyrell Gill
- "Love's Loyalty", Frances Tyrell Gill
- "While the Billy Boils", Keighley John Goodchild
- Excerpt from "Angel-Beckoned", Henry Newton Goodrich
- "The Sick Stockrider", Adam Lindsay Gordon
- "An Exile's Farewell", Adam Lindsay Gordon
- "The Cloud", Charles Harpur
- "The Creek of the Four Graves", Charles Harpur
- "A Storm in the Mountains", Charles Harpur
- "An Aboriginal Mother's Lament", Charles Harpur
- "The Hut on the Flat", Thomas William Heney
- "The Flower Everlasting", Thomas William Heney
- "My Queen of Dreams", Philip J. Holdsworth
- "Station Hunting on the Warrego : An Episode of Australian Frontier Life", Philip J. Holdsworth
- Excerpt from "The South Sea Sisters : A Lyric Masque", R. H. Horne
- "From the Cantata", John Howell
- "The Muse of Australia", Henry Kendall
- "The Mountains", Henry Kendall
- "The Rain Comes Sobbing to the Door", Henry Kendall
- "Prefatory Sonnets : I", Henry Kendall
- "Prefatory Sonnets : II", Henry Kendall
- "Sitting by the Fire", Henry Kendall
- "The Warrigal", Henry Kendall
- "Bell-Birds", Henry Kendall
- "At Euroma", Henry Kendall
- "September in Australia", Henry Kendall
- "Mooni", Henry Kendall
- "Cooranbean", Henry Kendall
- "Leichhardt", Henry Kendall
- "D'Entrecasteaux' Channel, Van Dieman's Land", John Dunmore Lang
- "English Wild Flowers", Caroline W. Leakey
- "The Story of Abel Tasman", Frances Sescadorowna Lewin
- "Dead Leaves", Edward Booth Loughran
- "The Abandoned Shaft", Edward Booth Loughran
- Excerpt from "The Story of Balladeadro", George Gordon McCrae
- "The Australian Emigrant's Song", George MacHenry
- "The Old World and the New", Mrs Patchett Martin
- "The Cynic of the Woods", Arthur Patchett Martin
- "A Romance in the Rough", Arthur Patchett Martin
- "A Bush Study, A La Watteau", Arthur Patchett Martin
- "The Prospector", O
- "The Storm", Arthur Patchett Martin
- "My Cousin from Pall Mall", Arthur Patchett Martin
- Excerpt from "John Cumberland", James L. Michael
- "How We Ran in the Black Warrgal Horse", E.G. Millard
- "Australia", Agnes Neale
- "The Blue Lake - Mount Gambier", Agnes Neale
- "The Dukite Snake", John Boyle O'Reilly
- "Solitude", A Wanderer
- "Seventy", A Wanderer
- "The Mountain Grave", A Wanderer
- "On the Mountains", A Wanderer
- "Dead in the Queensland Bush", Ernest Favenc
- "On the River", Robert Richardson
- "Musk Gully, Dromana", John Steele Robertson
- "In Memoriam : Henry Kendall", John Howlett-Ross
- "The Birth of Australia", Percy Russell
- "The Proclamation Tree", James Sadler
- "The Bell-Birds", William Sharp
- "The Stock-Driver's Ride", William Sharp
- "In the Ranges", William Sharp
- "An Orange Grove (Victoria)", William Sharp
- "Black Swans on the Murray Lagoons", William Sharp
- "Breaking Billows at Sorrento (Victoria)", William Sharp
- Australian Transcripts, William Sharp, poetry sequence
  - "Mid-Noon in January", William Sharp
  - "Shea-Oak Trees on a Stormy Day (S. E. Victoria)", William Sharp
  - "In the Fern (Gippsland)", William Sharp
  - "Sunset Amid the Buffalo Mountains (N.E. Victoria)", William Sharp
  - "The Flying Mouse - New South Wales (Moonlight)", William Sharp
  - "The Wood-Swallows (Sunrise)", William Sharp
  - "The Bell-Bird", William Sharp
  - "The Rock-Lily (New South Wales)", William Sharp
  - "The Flame Tree (New South Wales)", William Sharp
- "Morning in the Bush (December)", William Sharp
- "Justice (Uncivilised and Civilised)", William Sharp
- "Shea-Oaks (Near the Sea)", William Sharp
- "Solaced", Charles Allan Sherard
- "Lost in the Mallee", Charles Allan Sherard
- "Satan's Ganymede", Charles Allan Sherard
- "The Squire's Brother", Douglas Sladen
- "The Orange Tree", Douglas Sladen
- "The Two Birthdays", Douglas Sladen
- "'Advance Australia'", Douglas Sladen
- "The Blue Mountains of New South Wales : An Invitation", Douglas Sladen
- "The First Zigzag", Douglas Sladen
- "The Wentworth Falls", Douglas Sladen
- "Govett's Leap", Douglas Sladen
- "Windsor (N. S. W.) in Winter", Douglas Sladen
- "Under the Wattle", Douglas Sladen
- "The Bushman", A.C. Smith
- "Drought", Walter Smith
- "The Midnight Axe", J. Brunton Stephens
- "To a Black Gin", J. Brunton Stephens
- "My Other Chinee Cook", J. Brunton Stephens
- "Drought and Doctrine", J. Brunton Stephens
- "Lost Chance", J. Brunton Stephens
- "Quart Pot Creek", J. Brunton Stephens
- Excerpt from "The Dream of Dampier", Gerald Henry Supple
- "To a Water Wagtail", James Thomas
- "Adam Lindsay Gordon", Margaret Thomas
- "Wilt Thou Wait For Me?", Margaret Thomas
- "Death in the Bush", Margaret Thomas
- "A Little Tin Plate", Garnet Walch
- "Wool is Up", Garnet Walch
- "Wool is Down", Garnet Walch
- "A Drug in the Market", Garnet Walch
- Excerpt from "Australasia", William Charles Wentworth
- "A Wandering Heart", W. R. Wills
- "Waiting for the Mail", Frederick Sydney Wilson
- "Envoi", Thomas L. Work
- "The Stockman's Last Bed", unknown
- "The Bushman's Lullaby", Rolf Boldrewood
- "Careless Jim", unknown

== Publication history ==
The anthology was re-issued as follows:

- 1891, W. Scott, UK
- 1902, Simpkin, Marshall, and Co., UK

== Critical reception ==
A reviewer in the South Australian Register in 1888 opined "Mr. Sladen himself is a better critic than poet, and the remarks appearing in his introduction upon the excellencies and defects of the most distinguished of the writers from whom he quotes generally show sound judgment and strict impartiality." They concluded by calling the book "one of the pleasantest fruits of this centenary season."

Elizabeth Perkins in The Oxford Companion to Australian Literature stated that the anthology was "unimaginative and conventional" in its selection of poems, although it did acknowledge that the volume's publication "aroused interest in England in Australian poetry".

The Oxford Literary History of Australia states: "Colonial and London critics were concerned that Sladen, then based in England, intended to offer a definitive canon of Australian and New Zealand poetry to an international readership. The intention of A Century of Australian Song, however, was promotional rather than canonical in that it was 'a selection of poems inspired by life and scenery in Australia'."

Vivian Smith writing about Australian colonial poetry in The Cambridge History of Australian Literature commented "Sladen saw Australia as the country of the future and he wanted to showcase the poetry of the Australian colonies for readers in the Old Country". Smith concluded that this "is a remarkable collection for its time, and it has never been fully appreciated."

== See also ==
- 1888 in Australian literature
