= Australasia (poem) =

1823 poem by William Wentworth

- by William Wentworth
- Written: 1823
- First published in: G. and W. B. Whittaker
- Country: United Kingdom
- Language: English
- Published in English: 1823

Full text
- Australasia (Wentworth poem) at Wikisource

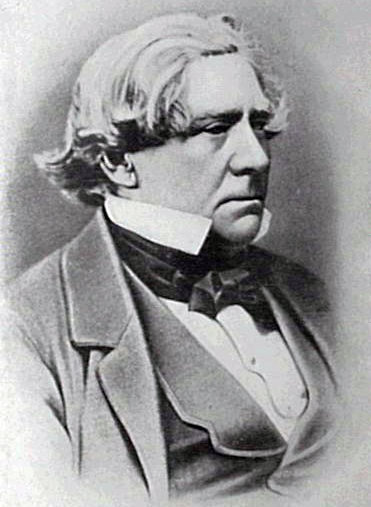
William Charles Wentworth

"Australasia" is a poem by Australian author William Charles Wentworth. It was the first book of verse composed by a native-born Australian poet.

Subtitled "A Poem Written for the Chancellor's Medal at the Cambridge Commencement, July, 1823", it was first published in London, U.K. in 1823 by G. and W. B. Whittaker in a 27-page pamphlet. It was reprinted in full in The Sydney Gazette and New South Wales Advertiser on 25 March 1824. Subsequent reprints were generally excerpts.

== Synopsis ==
According to The Cambridge History of Australian Literature, the poem is an "extended ode [that] celebrates the development of a new Britannia in another world and is marked by a rugged individuality of touch."

Wentworth dedicated his composition to the former Governor of New South Wales Lachlan Macquarie, vowing to redress perceived injustices to his name.

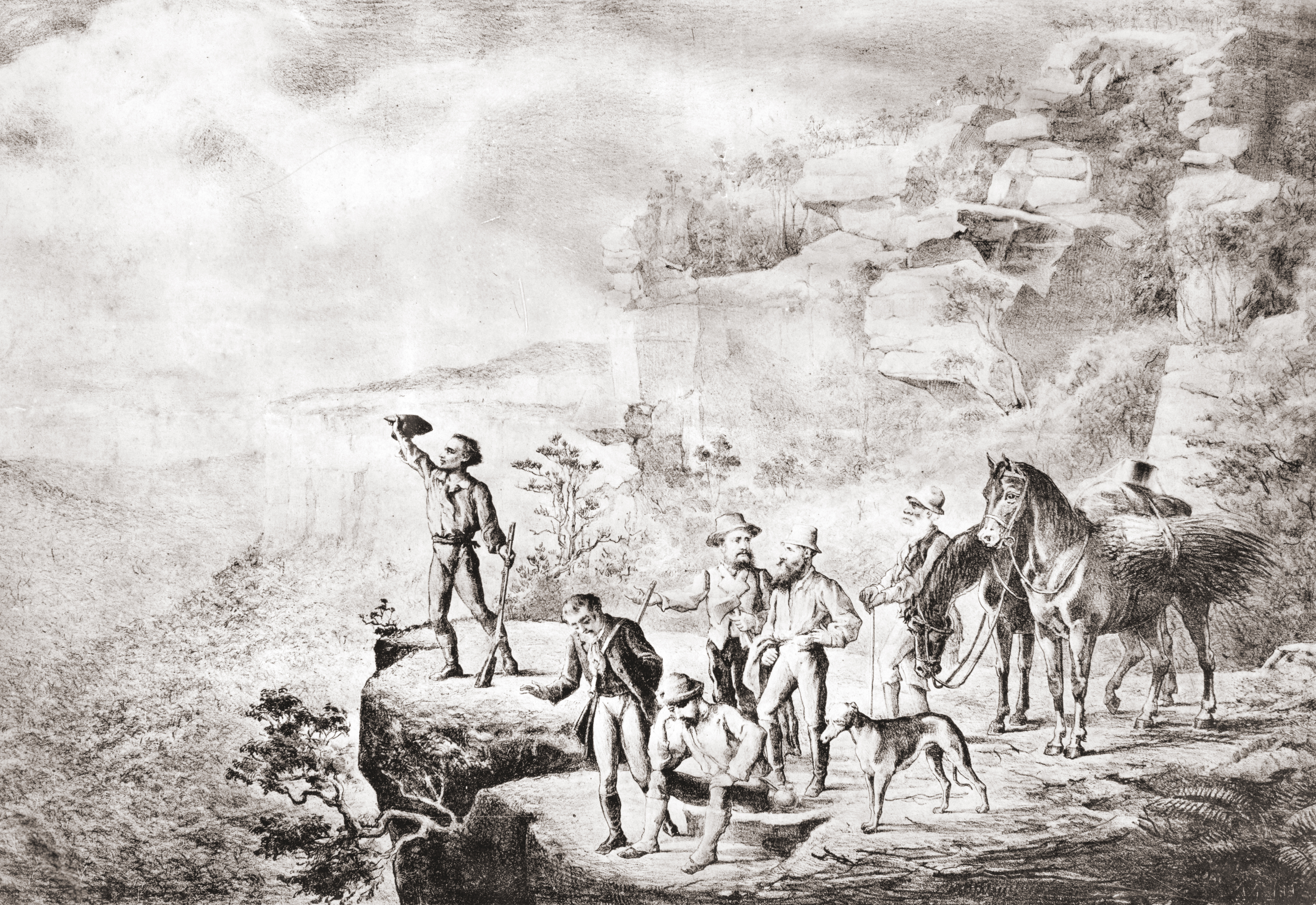
A representation of the Blue Mountains crossing by Wentworth, Gregory Blaxland and William Lawson

The poem is wide-ranging. The author makes reference to the scenery he witnessed on the 1813 expedition across the Blue Mountains, which opened the interior for settlement:

The boundless champaign burst upon our sight,
Till nearer seen the beauteous landscape grew,
Op'ning like Canaan on rapt Israel's view.

He also romanticises the lifestyle of Aboriginal Australians:

Ye primal tribes, lords of this old domain,
Swift-footed hunters of the pathless plain,
Unshackled wanderers, enthusiasts free,
Pure native sons of liberty,
Who hold all things in common, earth, sea, air,
Or only occupy the nightly lair.

Of his emerging nation, Wentworth writes:

And, O Britannia!... may this—thy last-born infant—then arise,
To glad thy heart, and greet thy parent eyes;
And Australasia float, with flag unfurl'd,
A new Britannia in another world!

== Critical reception ==
Wentworth submitted his poem for the University of Cambridge Chancellor's Medal in 1823, that year's subject being "Australasia". His composition came in second place out of 25. It was subsequently published in London and Sydney.

In his volume A History of Australian Literature, H. M. Green stated that it is a poem "that commands respect: it gives a charming picture of the environs of Sydney which Wentworth knew well, and of the mountains which he had crossed. It is rhetoric, but rhetoric worthy of respect because of its subject".

The Oxford Literary History of Australia states: "The poem attempts to project a distinctly Australian viewpoint and, with its prophecy of future greatness, is one of the first outbursts in Australian literature of nationalistic pride."

The Cambridge History of Australian Literature calls the poem "one of the most authoritative of the early poems with its robust epic vision and its patriotic assertion of the progress of British civilisation."

== Publication history ==
After the poem's initial publication in London in 1823 it was reprinted in full as follows:

- The Sydney Gazette and New South Wales Advertiser, 25 March 1824
- The Australian Town and Country Journal, 25 May 1872
- Whittaker & Co., UK, 1873
- University of Sydney, Australia, 1982

Excerpts from the poem were reprinted in:

- A Century of Australian Song edited by Douglas Sladen, Walter Scott Publishers, 1888
- An Anthology of Australian Verse edited by Bertram Stevens, Angus and Robertson, 1907
- The Oxford Book of Australasian Verse edited by Walter Murdoch, Oxford University Press, 1918
- Poets of Australia : An Anthology of Australian Verse edited by George Mackaness, Angus & Robertson, 1946
- An Anthology of Australian Verse edited by George Mackaness, Angus & Robertson, 1952
- From the Ballads to Brennan edited by T. Inglis Moore, Angus & Robertson, 1964
- Australian Verse from 1805 : A Continuum edited by Geoffrey Dutton, Rigby, 1976
- A Treasury of Colonial Poetry, Currawong, 1982
- Our Country : Classic Australian Poetry : From Colonial Ballads to Paterson & Lawson edited by Michael Cook, Little Hills Press, 2002
- Harbour City Poems : Sydney in Verse, 1788-2008 edited by Martin Langford, Puncher and Wattmann, 2009

== Notes ==
- Dedication: To Major General Macquarie, late Governor and Commander-in-Chief of the Colony of New South Wales and Its Dependencies [followed by a letter commencing 'My dear Sir...' (pp. 9-13)
- Epigraph: 'En unquam patrios longo post tempore fines, / Pauperis et tuguri congestum cespite culmen / Post aliquot mea regna videns mirabor aristas?'

== See also ==
- 1823 in literature
