= The Sick Stockrider (poem) =

1870 poem by Adam Lindsay Gordon

- by Adam Lindsay Gordon
- Written: 1869
- First published in: Colonial Monthly
- Country: Australia
- Language: English
- Publication date: January 1870

Full text
- The Sick Stockrider at Wikisource

The Sick Stockrider is a poem by Australian poet Adam Lindsay Gordon. It was first published in Colonial Monthly magazine in January 1870, although the magazine was dated December 1869. It was later in the poet's second and last poetry collection Bush Ballads and Galloping Rhymes (1870).

== Analysis ==
"The Evening Journal" (Adelaide) called the poem "...the best piece Mr. Gordon ever wrote..." after its publication in Bush Ballads and Galloping Rhymes.

The Oxford History of Australian Literature stated that "The ballad of the dying stockman, with its creed of mateship, its laconic acceptance in true bush style of whatever life and death may offer, led Marcus Clarke to assert that in Gordon's work lay the beginnings of a national school of Australian poetry."

In his commentary on the poem in 60 Classic Australian Poems editor Geoff Page noted that "there is no sense yet of the washed-out, hyper-heated, intensely Australian landscape created by the impressionist painters Streeton and Roberts in the 1890s". He also states that it's as if the poem "created the template which later and perhaps more sophisticated balladists like 'Banjo' Paterson and Henry Lawson could utilise."

== Further publications ==
- A Century of Australian Song edited by Douglas Sladen, Walter Scott Publishers, 1888
- An Anthology of Australian Verse edited by Bertram Stevens, Angus and Robertson, 1907
- The Sick Stockrider and Other Poems by Adam Lindsay Gordon (1945)
- From the Ballads to Brennan edited by T. Inglis Moore, Angus & Robertson, 1964
- Bards in the Wilderness : Australian Colonial Poetry to 1920 edited by Adrian Michell and Brian Elliott (1970)
- The Penguin Book of Australian Verse edited by Harry Heseltine, Penguin Books, 1972
- Cross-Country : A Book of Australian Verse edited by John Barnes and Brian MacFarlane, Heinemann (1984)
- My Country : Australian Poetry and Short Stories, Two Hundred Years edited by Leonie Kramer, Lansdowne, 1985
- A Treasury of Bush Verse edited by G. A. Wilkes, Angus and Robertson, 1991
- 100 Australian Poems You Need to Know edited by Jamie Grant, Hardie Grant, 2008
- 60 Classic Australian Poems edited by Geoff Page, University of NSW Press, 2009
- Australian Poetry Since 1788 edited by Geoffrey Lehmann and Robert Gray, University of NSW Press, 2011

== See also ==
- 1870 in poetry
- 1870 in literature
- 1870 in Australian literature
