= 1862 in Australian literature =

This article presents a list of the historical events and publications of Australian literature during 1862.

== Books ==
- Edward Bulwer-Lytton – A Strange Story

== Poetry ==
- Charles Harpur
  - "The Hunter's Indian Dove"
  - "Life and Death"
  - A Poet's Home
- Henry Kendall
  - "After the Hunt"
  - "Caroline Chisholm"
  - "The Muse of Australia"
  - Poems and Songs

== Births ==
A list, ordered by date of birth (and, if the date is either unspecified or repeated, ordered alphabetically by surname) of births in 1862 of Australian literary figures, authors of written works or literature-related individuals follows, including year of death.

- 27 September — Francis William Adams, novelist (died 1893)
- 28 September – W. T. Goodge, poet and writer (died 1909)
- 29 October – John Bernard O'Hara, poet and schoolmaster (died 1927)
- 3 November – Thomas William Heney, poet, novelist and journalist (died 1928)

Unknown date

- Aeneas J. Gunn, pastoralist and writer (died 1903)

== Deaths ==
A list, ordered by date of death (and, if the date is either unspecified or repeated, ordered alphabetically by surname) of deaths in 1862 of Australian literary figures, authors of written works or literature-related individuals follows, including year of birth.

- 13 March – Roderick Flanagan, historian, poet and journalist (born 1828 in Ireland; died in London after 20 years in Australia)

== See also ==
- 1862 in Australia
- 1862 in literature
- 1862 in poetry
- List of years in Australian literature
- List of years in literature
