= September in Australia =

1867 poem by Australian poet Henry Kendall

- by Henry Kendall
- First published in: The Sydney Morning Herald
- Country: Australia
- Language: English
- Publication date: 19 September 1867
- Lines: 64

Full text
- The Poems of Henry Kendall/September in Australia at Wikisource

"September in Australia" (1867) is a poem by Australian poet Henry Kendall.

It was originally published in The Sydney Morning Herald newspaper on 19 September 1867, and was subsequently reprinted in the author's single-author collections and a number of Australian poetry anthologies.

== Critical reception ==
Critic Carmel Gaffney called this poem "the most successful of Kendall's poems that include plaintiveness for past loves and memories, and that combine positive and negative aspects of the landscape in such a manner that a single mood dominates." She went on to note that, by combining these aspects and by "celebrating the differences of 'shadow and shine' as splendid manifestations of the season, Kendall manages to transcend his sorrows."

== Publication history ==
After the poem's initial publication in The Sydney Morning Herald newspaper in 1867 it was reprinted as follows:

- The Leader, 28 September 1867
- The Australasian, 28 September 1867
- Leaves from Australian Forests by Henry Kendall, George Robertson, 1869
- Poems of Henry Kendall by Henry Kendall, George Robertson, 1886
- A Century of Australian Song edited by Douglas Sladen, Walter Scott Publishers, 1888
- An Anthology of Australian Verse edited by Bertram Stevens, Angus and Robertson, 1907
- The Golden Treasury of Australian Verse edited by Bertram Stevens, Angus and Robertson, 1909
- The Oxford Book of Australasian Verse edited by Walter Murdoch, Oxford University Press, 1918
- Selections from Australian Poets edited by Bertram Stephens and George Mackaness, Cornstalk Publishing, 1925
- Australian Bush Songs and Ballads edited by Will Lawson, Frank Johnson, 1944
- Rose Lorraine and Other Poems by Henry Kendall, W. H. Honey, 1945
- Poets of Australia : An Anthology of Australian Verse edited by George Mackaness, Angus & Robertson, 1946
- An Anthology of Australian Verse edited by George Mackaness, Angus & Robertson, 1952
- Selected Poems of Henry Kendall edited by T. Inglis Moore, Angus and Robertson, 1957
- From the Ballads to Brennan edited by T. Inglis Moore, Angus & Robertson, 1964
- The Poetical Works of Henry Kendall edited by Thomas Thornton Reed (1966)
- Silence Into Song : An Anthology of Australian Verse edited by Clifford O'Brien, Rigby, 1968
- A Treasury of Colonial Poetry, Currawong, 1982
- Cross-Country : A Book of Australian Verse edited by John Barnes and Brian MacFarlane, Heinemann, 1984
- Henry Kendall: Poetry, Prose and Selected Correspondence edited by Michael Ackland, University of Queensland Press, 1993

== See also ==
- 1867 in Australian literature
- 1867 in poetry
