= Jack Donahue =

Australian bushranger

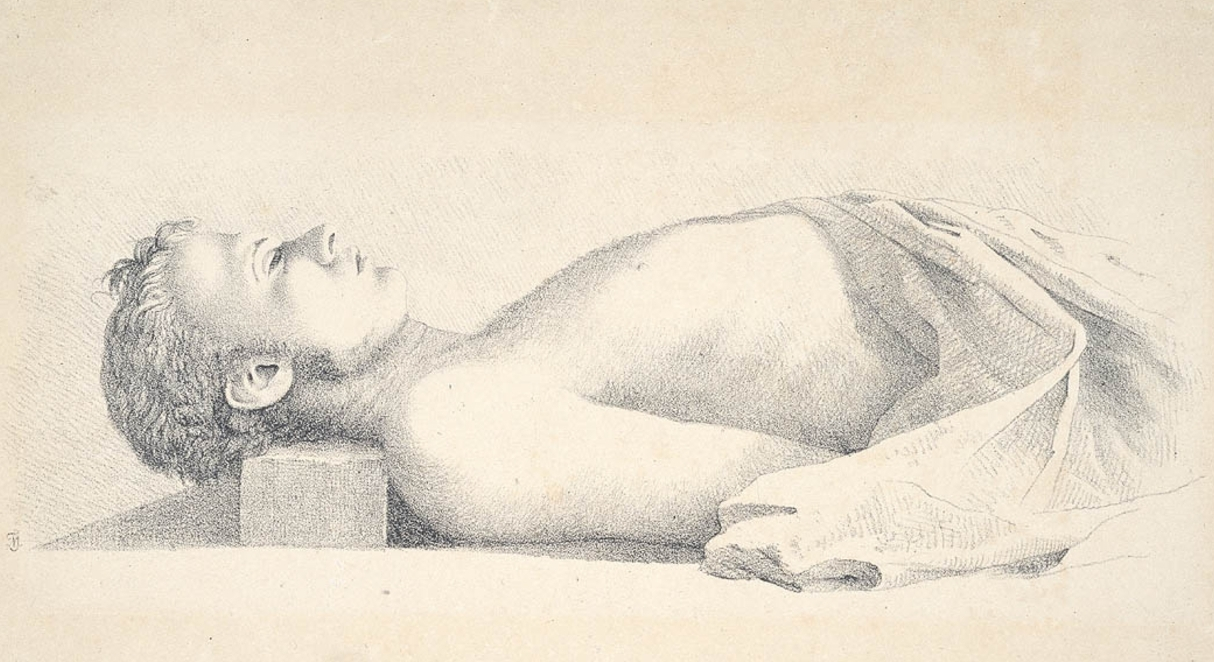
- The lithograph (c. 1830) of "John Donohoe's" body as it lay in a morgue in Sydney Hospital is attributed to Sir Thomas Mitchell, Surveyor-General of New South Wales
- Born: John Donahue c. 1806; Dublin, Ireland
- Died: 1 September 1830 (about 23-24); Bringelly, New South Wales, Australia
- Cause of death: Police shootout
- Other names: Bold Jack Donahue (nickname), Jack Donohoe (surname alternate spelling)
- Occupations: Bushranger (between 1825 and 1830)
- Known for: Member of the Wild Colonial Boys

John Donahue (c. 1806 – 1 September 1830), also spelled Donohoe, and known as Jack Donahue and Bold Jack Donahue, was an Irish-born bushranger in Australia between 1825 and 1830. He became part of the notorious "Wild Colonial Boys".

== Early life and transportation ==
Donahue was born in Dublin, Ireland c.1806. An orphan, he began pick-pocketing and, after later involvement in a burglary, was convicted of intent to commit a felony in 1823. After being detained aboard HMS Surprise, a convict hulk moored in Cork, in September 1824, he was transferred to the ship Ann and Amelia and transported with 200 other prisoners to Australia, arriving in Sydney in January 1825. Upon being shown his cell at Carter's barracks, Donahue remarked 'A home for life'. During his early imprisonment, he was twice sentenced to fifty lashes as punishment.

== Bushranging ==
Donahue escaped to the bush from the Quakers Hill farm with two men named George Kilroy and William Smith. They formed an outlaw gang known as "The Strippers," since they stripped wealthy landowners of their clothing, money and food. Servants on the farms sometimes provided them with information about their masters, and at times even provided them with food and shelter.

Government surveyor Robert Hoddle wrote in his diary about a close encounter with Donahue in New South Wales in the 1820s:

"Another time, near the same place ('the junction of the Bringelly and Cowpasture Roads'), the notorious Donahue nearly got me. I had dismounted from my horse to remove some shifting rails, being a short cut through the bush to Prospect Hill, the residence of a friend, Mr. Lawson. I remounted my horse double quick, and most unceremoniously left the rails on the ground, and lost no time to be out of sight. He was accompanied by another bushranger."

Toby Ryan later recalled how he had 'boiled the billy' with Donahue, when as a fifteen-year-old, he was out looking for cattle near Llandilo:

"Donahue was the most insignificant looking creature imaginable, and it seemed strange that such as he was able to keep a country in terror for eight years. He was attired in a velveteen coat and vest, cabbage tree hat, moleskin trousers, and a blue nankeen shirt, with a heart worked on the breast in white cotton"."

On 14 December 1827, Donohue and his gang were arrested for robbing bullock-drays on the Sydney to Windsor Road. On 1 March 1828, Judge John Stephen of the Supreme Court of Sydney sentenced them all to death. Between the court and the gaol, Donohue managed to escaped from custody. Kilroy and Smith were hanged on 24 March 1828.

== Wild Colonial Boys ==
Evading capture, Donohue linked up with other criminals to rob isolated farms around Bathurst. In order to restore the law, the government sent reinforcements and aboriginal trackers. It didn't take long for the posse to catch up with the bandits. A shoot-out occurred and Donohue managed to escape but one was killed and three were captured. These prisoners were hanged on 22 December 1828.

Returning to more familiar territory, near Windsor, Donohue linked up with others to continue his life of crime. In March 1829, he, along with John Walmsle, shot and killed a Mr Clements, a settler on the Hunter River. He later become one of the "Wild Colonial Boys", a loose bonded gang of twelve to fifteen men. Donohue's cunning and guile soon had him on equal standing as the leaders of this gang of Underwood and MacNamara. These two had the reputation for wily pluck, daring and desperation. The gang would operate in groups of three or four in order to bail up settlers and plunder property from Bathurst to Yass and from the Hunter region to the Illawarra.

In 1829, notices were distributed with a reward of £20 for Donohue's capture, describing him as '22 years of age, 5 feet 4 inches [163 cm] in height, brown freckled complexion, flaxen hair, blue eyes, and has a scar under the left nostril'. One year later, the reward increased to £200.

In groups of three or four, they laid in wait for travellers on the highway or, knowing settlers to be away from home, they would attack and plunder their houses. They even attacked the toll house and carried off everything worth taking. Donohue's tact and ways of only robbing the better off procured him a host of friends among the poorer settlers. They gave the police false information about him and, when they were dogging him rather too hard, the settlers stowed him away in their back rooms or under the beds.

An act was passed authorising the justices to issue warrants for searching the houses of the settlers suspected. To make matters more lively, a proclamation was issued promising a reward, a free pardon, and a cheap trip to England to any convict, and acreage of land to any free person who would lodge Donohue, MacNamara, or Underwood in custody.

Police caught up with two of the gang, MacNamara and Dalton. In a brief gunfight MacNamara was shot, taking a bullet to the breast, and died. Dalton was taken to Sydney, tried and sentenced to death for robbery of John Ellison near Parramatta. Dalton was hanged on 28 June 1830. To streamline the leadership of the gang, Donohue shot and killed Underwood. It was said that Underwood was keeping a diary of the gangs exploits and Donohue wasn't impressed.

== Death ==
In the late afternoon of 1 September 1830, Donohue was shot dead by John Muckleston, following a shootout between bushrangers and soldiers at Bringelly, New South Wales. Donohue was hit in the left temple and neck and died instantly. The Sydney Gazette, on behalf of "all respectable citizens", rejoiced at Donohue's death. Smoking pipes were made in the shape of Donohue's head, including the bullet-holes in his forehead, and were bought and smoked by the citizens of Sydney.

When he was killed, Donohue was with William Webber and John Walmsley. Webber and Walmsley ran away into the scrub and managed to escape. Walmsley was captured by five policemen on 5 January 1831 near Mount Philo. He was sentenced to death but was given a pardon on giving evidence against persons who had aided him. Webber was captured without incident on 14 January 1831. He was sitting under a tree when he was surprised by two constables. Sentenced to death, he was hanged on 18 July 1831 in Sydney.

== Popular culture ==
In 1833, Donohue's life was recounted in the theatre play The Tragedy of Donohoe, by Charles Harpur, later published in 1853 as The Bushrangers. Harpur had been inspired to write his play after the April 1829 shooting of a settler on the Hunter River by two bushrangers. Harpur had been sixteen at the time and believed that Donohue was one of the bushrangers.

Donohue was immortalised in the ballad "Bold Jack Donohue", and in the even more popular song "The Wild Colonial Boy". Authorities tried to ban the song, but failed. Instead it became a ballad of defiance, continuing to be sung by generations of Australians and becoming part of Australia's folklore. With time, the lyrics changed Donohue's name to Jack Doolan, Jack Dowling, Jack Doogan and even Jim Doolan. The ethos line that struck a chord was "'I'll fight but not surrender 'til I die', cried the Wild Colonial Boy."

The song “Jim Jones at Botany Bay” is an Australian folk song that mentions Donohue.

== See also ==
- List of convicts transported to Australia
