= A Song of Autumn =

1892 poem set to music by Edward Elgar

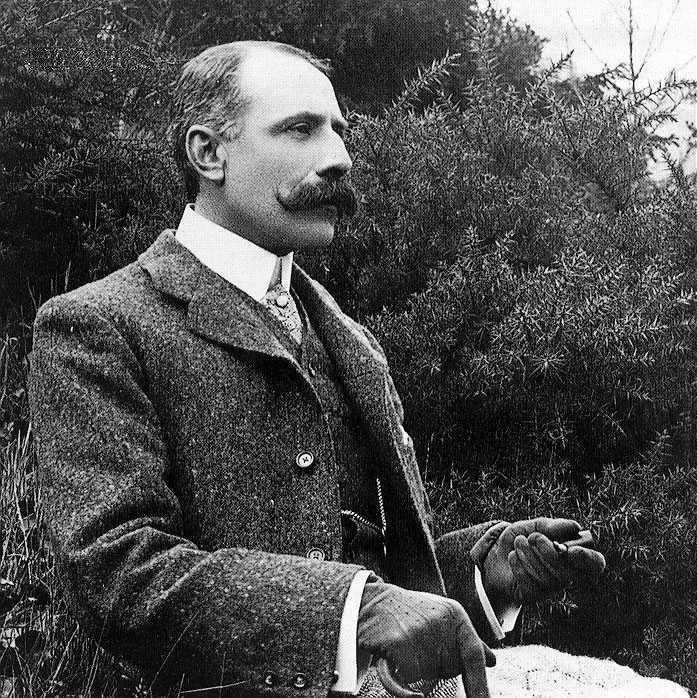
Edward Elgar, c. 1900

"A Song of Autumn" is a poem by Adam Lindsay Gordon set to music by Edward Elgar in 1892.

The song was dedicated by Elgar to 'Miss Marshall'. It was first published by Orsborn & Tuckwood, then by Ascherberg in 1892 before it was re-published in 1907 as one of the Seven Lieder, with English and German words (German words by Edward Sachs).

== Lyrics ==
A Song of Autumn
Where shall we go for our garlands glad
At the falling of the year,
When the burnt-up banks are yellow and sad,
When the boughs are yellow and sere?
Where are the old ones that once we had,
And where are the new ones near?
What shall we do for our garlands glad
At the falling of the year?

Child! can I tell where the garlands go?
Can I say where the lost leaves veer
On the brown-burnt banks, when the wild winds blow,
When they drift through the dead-wood drear?
Girl! When the garlands of next year glow,
You may gather again, my dear—
But I go where the last year's lost leaves go
At the falling of the year.

Herbstlied
Wo soll ich pflücken den Blumenstrauss,
Wenn der Herbst zieht in das Land,
Wenn die dürren Blätter gelb sind und kraus,
Und der Büsche Grün verschwand?
Wo sind die einst schmückten unser Haus,
Und wann sind die neuen zur Hand?
Wo soll ich pflücken den Blumenstrauss,
Wenn der Herbst zieht in das Land?

Kind! kann ich sagen wo Blumen blüh'n?
Wohin Blatt, wohin Blüte schwand?
Ob sie fielen unter der Sonne Glühn,
Ob die Winde sie streuten ins Land?
Frühling bringt Blumen für dich, mein Kind,
Pflücke sie mit der weissen Hand;
Doch ich werde ruh'n, wo die Blätter sind,
Wenn der Herbst zieht in das Land.

== Recordings ==
- Songs and Piano Music by Edward Elgar has "A Song of Autumn" performed by Amanda Pitt (soprano), with David Owen Norris (piano).
- Elgar: Complete Songs for Voice & Piano Konrad Jarnot (baritone), Reinild Mees (piano)
- The Songs of Edward Elgar SOMM CD 220 Christopher Maltman (baritone) with Malcolm Martineau (piano), at Southlands College, London, April 1999

== Sources ==
- Banfield, Stephen, Sensibility and English Song: Critical studies of the early 20th century (Cambridge University Press, 1985) ISBN 0-521-37944-X
- Kennedy, Michael, Portrait of Elgar (Oxford University Press, 1968) ISBN 0-19-315414-5
- Sladen, Douglas (ed.), The Poems of Adam Lindsay Gordon, London, Constable & Co., 1912
- Young, Percy M. (1973). Elgar O.M.: A Study of a Musician. London: Collins. OCLC 869820.
