= The Sick Stockrider =

- Directed by: W. J. Lincoln; Godfrey Cass
- Written by: W. J. Lincoln
- Based on: original poem by Adam Lindsay Gordon
- Starring: Roy Redgrave; Godfrey Cass
- Cinematography: Maurice Bertel
- Production company: Lincoln-Cass Films
- Release date: 18 August 1913
- Running time: 2,000 feet or 2,500 feet
- Country: Australia
- Languages: Silent film English intertitles

The Sick Stockrider is a 1913 film directed by W. J. Lincoln based on the 1870 poem of the same title by Adam Lindsay Gordon. It was the first production from Lincoln-Cass Films and is one of the few Australian silent films to survive in its entirety.

== Plot ==
The film presents the verses of the poem one by one, separated by illustrated tableaux. It tells the story about a dying stockman.

== Cast ==
- Roy Redgrave
- Godfrey Cass as the stock rider's mate
- George Bryant as the stockrider
- Beryl Bryant
- Tom Cannam
- Ward Lyons

== Production ==
Adam Lindsay Gordon's ballad was first published in 1870, the year of his death. The movie was the first from Lincoln-Cass Films, established in 1913. It was shot at the company's studio in Elsternwick, Melbourne and near Healesville. It was finished by August 1913

The cast performed a show for the people of Healesville during production.

It was the first of the company's film's released "though it was not the largest of their productions, they thought they had something which would appeal to all present. They were Australians, and hopeful of interesting the public in Australian pictures."

== Release ==
Screenings were often accompanied by a lecturer who would recite the poem.

The movie screened to thirty full houses in Victoria. It has been described as "solid and stagey with shaking canvas sets, an exaggerated alcoholic scene and a bull-goring sequence in which an actor tumble turns across an animal all too obviously at rest."

Contemporary reports said it was a box office success. However years later Table Talk wrote that "the film, though well made and essentially picturesque, had not sufficient of a story to grip the attention of an ordinary pint lire theatre attendance."

=== Critical ===
A contemporary review said that:

The views wore very life-like and distinct, and illustrated the stockrider reeling from lm saddle, and as his mate tended him beneath the trees, recalling the scenes of his past life 'wheeling through the wild scrub the cattle in the wood,' Yarding the cattle gave opportunity for a fine and animated bush scene, with exhibitions of buckjumping, and was followed by the exciting chase of the bush ranger, 'Starlight.' and his gang, by the troopers' and bush men, the Tjnsrl ranaer at bay, and the struggle in the watercourse.. The lights and shades, the tragedies and comedies of bush life, were followed by the death of the stock rider, with the sturdy bush children romping over his crave — altogether a very fine and vivid production, which elicited a round of applause.

Another review said:

The only drawback to it is that there is no connected 'story ' in the poem, only a series of incidents of bush life, so that the attention of the audience cannot be oarried to a culminating climax; but that the feature which does not apply to other films by the same company, where the dramatic interest is sustained throughout.

The Bulletin wrote that the title was:

A sure draw on the bills, but not the easiest of themes for picture treatment. George Bryant played the dying man, whilst Godfrey Cass did the friend who shook his pillows up. a bit. The incidents of the sick one's old colonial days were arranged for interpolation as the yarn proceeded. The death scene and the kiddies romping on the “grassy mound” of the deceased. were, easy things to finish up with. All the.pictures are as good as the best imported, indeed, the children, frisking about the grave is a fine photographic effort. .When the “Sick Stockrider” is shown—it has had two successful innings at Hoyt’s —the poem is recited by Roy Redgrave, ’ who gets his best effects when the Stockrider and his mate are on the screen, and Bryant’s lips seem to move in unison with the verse.

=== Remake ===
Harry Southwell also announced plans to film the poem but no movie resulted.
