= Ann and Amelia (ship) =

Two vessels with the name Ann and Amelia have served the East India Company (EIC).

- Ann and Amelia (1781 ship) was launched at Whitby in 1781. She carried cargo to India for the EIC in 1782, and returned in 1803 with another cargo for the company. The Royal Navy purchased her in 1804, and converted her to a 44-gun fifth rate. She became a storeship in 1808, and was expended in April 1809 as a fireship at the battle of the Basque Roads.
- Ann and Amelia (1816 ship) was launched in 1816, at Chittagong. She transported convicts from Britain to Port Jackson, New South Wales, in 1822. She was sold at Calcutta in August 1823, for a "Free Trader". She then made three voyages for the EIC and was lost in a gale on the coast of France in 1835, as she was finishing her third voyage.
