= The Bushrangers, a Play in Five Acts, and Other Poems =

Book by Charles Harpur

- Author: Charles Harpur
- Language: English
- Publisher: W. R. Piddington
- Publication date: 1853
- Publication place: Australia
- Media type: Print (hardback & paperback)
- Pages: 126
- Preceded by: Songs of Australia
- Followed by: A Poet's Home

The Bushrangers, a Play in Five Acts, and Other Poems (1853) was the third collection of poems by Australian poet Charles Harpur. It was released in hardback by W. R. Piddington in 1853. It features the poet's second play as well as some of his major works, including "The Creek of the Four Graves", "To an Echo on the Banks of the Hunter" and "Lines Suggested by the Appearance of a Comet".

The original collection includes the title play and 39 poems by the author that are reprinted from various sources, though later editions varied the contents.

== See also ==
- 1853 in poetry

== Notes ==
- Dedication : "To H. D. Stenhouse, Esq., these poems are respectfully inscribed by one, who, though personally unacquainted with him, has learned to appreciate his character and talents."
- Parts of "The Bushrangers" were printed under the title "The Tragedy of Donohoe" in the Sydney Monitor (February 1835). It was the first play written by an Australian-born author to be printed in Australia.

== Contents ==
- "The Bushrangers, A Play in Five Acts"
- "The Creek of the Four Graves"
- "Lines Suggested by the Appearance of a Comet"
- "The Bush Fire"
- "To an Echo on the Banks of the Hunter"
- "Ned Connor : A Tale of the Bush"
- "To -"
- "To the Moon"
- "Memory's Genesis"
- "Poetry"
- "The Vision of the Rock"
- "Sonnet"
- "A Poet's Home"
- "I Love Him So"
- "Eva Gray"
- "To Mary"
- "Emblems"
- "Dreams of the Beloved"
- "Absence"
- "Doubts"
- [Untitled]
- "Happy Spite"
- "The Dream by the Fountain"
- "The Master Mariner's Song (Outward Bound)"
- "Freedom in Faith"
- [Untitled]
- "Finality"
- "Consolation"
- "To an Echo on the Banks of the Hunter"
- "My Political Belief"
- "The Tree of Liberty : A Song for the Future"
- "An Anthem for the Australasian League"
- "Burns"
- "Wordsworth"
- "The Verse of Coleridge's 'Christabel'"
- "To My Young Countryman, D.H.D."
- "A Combat"
- "Records of Romantic Passion"
- "The Flight of Peace"
- "To My First-Born, Washington Harpur"

== Critical reception ==
G. B. Barton, writing in Literature in New South Wales (1866) opined that "The dramatic production with which the volume commences is not entitled to much praise, either on the score of its poetry, or of the power of construction displayed in it; but at the same time, it contains passages which shew that it was written by a poet. The title of the play sufficiently indicates its character...Mr Harpur has undoubtedly made the best of his subject; but it is much to be regretted that the labour devoted to it was not employed on a higher theme." Of the poetry he then continued: "Among the minor poems contained in this volume, there are one or two which evidence considerable power in the author. Chief among these is the "Creek of the Four Graves"."

In their review at the time of publication Empire rated the volume at a somewhat higher level than Barton: "This little volume contains the most satisfactory proof of the existence of native genius of a high order, that has been yet offered to the public. The production of genuine poetry is nowhere a matter of every-day [sic] occurrence. In New South Wales it will be deemed by many to approach the nature of a marvel, and will, at all events, be suggestive of novel reflection to men who, however little given to literary pursuits in the abstract, are alive to every indication of progress, and will be especially interested in the so early emergence of the higher spiritual life in a community like our own. Public interest in the matter will doubtless deepen when it is stated that the writer of this remarkable volume, a native-born Australian, has, we believe, never been beyond the shores of this continent."
