= The Tragedy of Donohoe =

Play by Charles Harpur

- Original title: The Bushrangers
- Original language: English
- Written by: Charles Harpur
- Genre: verse drama

Premiere
- Date: 1835

The Tragedy of Donohoe (1835; retitled The Bushrangers, a Play in Five Acts in 1853, The Bush-Rangers in 1860 and Stalwart the Bushranger in 1867) is a play by Charles Harpur.

It was the first play published in Australia with an Australian setting. However it appears the play was not actually performed in Australia.

It was the first Australian play with an Australian setting by a locally born author. Writer Margaret Williams called it "a five-act Elizabethan drama with a heavy overlay of full-blown romanticism in its brigands, haunted forests, pastoral youth and maiden, and touch of the Gothic horrors. The realities of colonial New South Wales seem almost submerged in the Shakespeare imitation."

== Origins and revisions ==
Harpur wrote The Tragedy of Donhoe while living in Sydney in the early 1830s. It was originally based on the life of Jack Donahue, a prominent bushranger who had murdered William Clements in 1828.

Harpur continually revised the play, however, and in later versions he renamed the protagonist "Stalwart" and his victim "Abel". By the time he died, Harpur had produced at least four distinct versions of the play.

The play's complex textual history began in 1834, when Harpur presented a manuscript to Edward Smith Hall, the editor of The Sydney Monitor. Hall was impressed with the play, and published substantial extracts in the newspaper the following February.

Harpur published the first complete version of the play in 1853, as part of his book The Bushrangers, a Play in Five Acts, and Other Poems. He produced two final versions of the play, The Bush-Rangers in 1860 and Stalwart the Bushranger 1867; these versions remained in manuscript at his death. According to Williams, "The revisions between 1835 and 1867 indicate, if anything, an increasing sympathy with the bushranger and a more explicitly Australian setting."

== Literary and dramatic significance ==
The Tragedy of Donohoe is considered an important example of Gothic literature, nineteenth-century melodrama and Romantic tragedy.

According to Leslie Rees "at first glance, The Bushrangers (1853 version) is the usual studied attempt at a drama mainly in blank verse as conscientiously undertaken by any and every ambitious poet. But it is rather more important than that. It contains some good qualities of dramatic feeling."

== See also ==
- The Bandit of the Rhine
