= A Horseman in Arcadia =

1946 Australian radio play

A Horseman in Arcadia is a 1946 Australian radio play about Adam Lindsay Gordon by Evelyn Quinland.

It won equal in a 1946 radio writing competition (tying with Kathleen Carroll while Philip Grenville Mann won with The Seas Between.)

The Sun called it a "well-knit play".

ABC Weekly said "it is hard to believe that Horseman In Arcadia only tied for second place in the recent Lux play competition. The play... offered more dramatic quality, expert construction, and authentic character- building than either of the previous two. Miss Evelyn Quinlan... showed a great flair for dramatic writing."

== Cast ==
- John O'Malley as Gordon
- Walter Pym
- Babs Mayhew as Margaret Parkes
- George Willoughby as Captain Gordon
- Ron Roberts as Bill Trayne
- Harry Howlett
- Wendy Brunton Gibb as Jane Bridges
