= Dingley Dell Conservation Park =

Protected area in South Australia

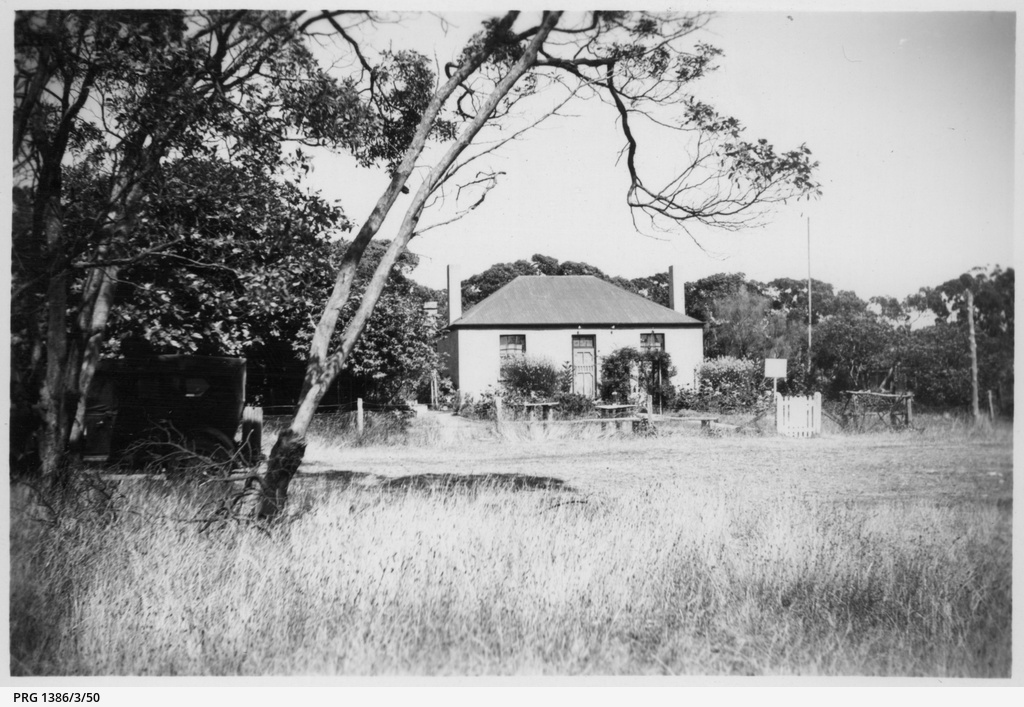
- View of Dingley Dell, the home of poet Adam Lindsay Gordon, circa 1950, State Library of South Australia PRG-1386-3-50

- Location within South Australia
- Location: South Australia
- Nearest city: Port MacDonnell
- Coordinates: 38°02′27″S 140°40′44″E
- Area: 6 ha (15 acres)
- Established: 1 January 1922
- Visitors: ‘Low’ (in 1994)
- Governing body: Department for Environment and Water
- Website: Official website

Dingley Dell Conservation Park (formerly known as the Dingley Dell National Pleasure Resort) is a protected area in the Australian state of South Australia located in the state's south east in the gazetted locality of Port MacDonnell about 4 kilometres (2.5 mi) north-west of the town centre of Port MacDonnell and about 26 kilometres (16 mi) south of the city centre in Mount Gambier.

The conservation park occupies land in Part Section 138 of the cadastral unit of the Hundred of MacDonnell. The land contains the cottage occupied by the poet, Adam Lindsay Gordon from 1864 to 1866. It was purchased by the Government of South Australia in 1922 at “the request of the Dingley Dell Restoration Committee”. The land originally gained protected status as a national pleasure resort proclaimed under the National Pleasure Resorts Act 1914 and which was managed by the South Australian Tourist Bureau. On 27 April 1972, it was renamed as the Dingley Dell Conservation Park upon the proclamation of the National Parks and Wildlife Act 1972 which repealed the former act along with other statutes concerned with conservation.

The conservation park was described in 1994 as follows:

1. Built development on the property consists of the restored cottage which serves as a museum for “a collection of Gordon memorabilia,“ and a “caretaker residence, workshop, public toilet facilities and picnic facilities”.
2. An “open woodland of South Australian blue gum” is located on the property along with “isolated” stands of the following species - blackwood, golden wattle, coastal bearded-heath and native box.
3. its boundaries are fenced and are adjoined to the north and west by grazing land and by roads to its south and east.

In 1980, the conservation park was listed on the former Register of the National Estate.

Gordon's former home which was listed on the South Australian Heritage Register on 24 July 1980 under the name of the Dingley Dell Museum is managed by a commercial operator.

As of 1994, visitation was “low” with “the majority of visitors viewing the cottage, and a lesser proportion using the walking track behind the cottage”.

As of 2014, the conservation park had not been given an IUCN protected area category.

== See also ==
- Protected areas of South Australia
