= The Dream by the Fountain =

1843 poem by Australian poet Charles Harpur

- by Charles Harpur
- First published in: The Australasian Chronicle
- Country: Australia
- Language: English
- Publication date: 10 June 1843
- Lines: 72

Full text
- The Dream by the Fountain at Wikisource

"The Dream by the Fountain" (1843) is a poem by Australian poet Charles Harpur.

It was originally published in The Australasian Chronicle on 10 June 1843, and was subsequently reprinted in the author's single-author collections and an Australian poetry anthology. The original length of the poem in 1843 was 72 lines, but by the time of its publication in The Bushrangers, a Play in Five Acts, and Other Poems in 1853 the length had increased to 92 lines.

== Critical reception ==
In an appreciation of the poet's work in The Catholic Press in 1897 J. E. S. Henerie noted that this poem, along with a number of others of the poet's, is "full of local scenery, but redeemed in the master hand of the poet from being called mere local colour. The poet's mind is universal, and the descriptions he uses are the means to an end, and must possess as much significence for the inhabitants of the other portion of the world as for us, if the poet be true."

Australian poet Judith Wright noted that, with this poem, Harpur "set himself the task of becoming the first authentic voice of a new nation in whose future, even at the depths of disappointment and despair, he never quite lost faith."

In an essay titled "The Ecopoetics of Charles Harpur" Cassandra Julie O’Loughlin of the University of Newcastle wrote: "During the time Harpur lived, Australia was frequently seen through European eyes as inhospitable, menacing and uninteresting to its human inhabitants. Although he acknowledged its threatening environs, Harpur saw it as a fascinating place of real beauty. He considered it his responsibility to convey the voice of the country in order to make it known and appreciated, and to overcome the sense of alienation experienced by the European observer." She then noted that, in this poem, "he prepared the way."

== Publication history ==
After the poem's initial publication in The Australasian Chronicle newspaper in 1843 it was reprinted as follows:

- Poems by Charles Harpur, George Robertson, 1883
- The Bushrangers, a Play in Five Acts, and Other Poems by Charles Harpur, W. R. Piddington, 1853
- The Poetical Works of Charles Harpur edited by Elizabeth Perkins, Angus and Robertson, 1984
- Cross-Country : A Book of Australian Verse edited by John Barnes and Brian MacFarlane, Heinemann, 1988

== See also ==
- 1843 in literature
- 1843 in poetry
