= The Creek of the Four Graves =

1845 poem by Australian poet Charles Harpur

- by Charles Harpur
- First published in: The Weekly Register of Politics, Facts and General Literature
- Country: Australia
- Language: English
- Publication date: 9-23 August 1845

Full text
- The Creek of the Four Graves at Wikisource

"The Creek of the Four Graves" is a poem by Australian writer Charles Harpur that was first published in three parts in The Weekly Register of Politics, Facts and General Literature on 9 August, 16 August and 23 August 1845.

The author then published an erratum in the same paper on 30 August 1845 which corrects what appears to be a misprinting.

It was later included in the author's poetry collection The Bushrangers, a Play in Five Acts, and Other Poems (1853), and was subsequently reprinted in various newspapers, magazines and poetry anthologies.

Harpur continued to revise the poem throughout his life. His widow, Mary Harpur, authorised a version for inclusion in the poet's collection Poems (1883).

== Reception ==
In a review of The Bushrangers, a Play; and Other Poems by Charles Harpur, a writer in The Maitland Mercury, and Hunter River General Advertiser, 14 May 1853 stated: " "The Creek of the Four Graves" is a very fine piece of narrative and descriptive poetry combined, and would alone entitle the author to be held a true poet."

In a review of an 1899 edition of Poems by Charles Harpur in Freeman's Journal, the writer opined: " 'The Creek of the Four Graves' is a noteworthy performance not only in Australian verse, but also in modern English literature. An affected fad of the local bardling is local colour, but to use it properly he should study the way Harpur has used it in the poem mentioned."

The Oxford Companion to Australian Literature states: "Its story of a group of settlers murdered by natives is presented with individuality and force. Set in the Hawkesbury district and the Blue Mountains, the poem combines a realistic narrative with effective description of the local Australian scene."

== Further publications ==
- The Bushrangers, a Play in Five Acts, and Other Poems by Charles Harpur (1853)
- Poems by Charles Harpur (1883)
- Australian Ballads and Rhymes : Poems Inspired by Life and Scenery in Australia and New Zealand (1888) edited by Douglas Sladen
- A Century of Australian Song (1888) edited by Douglas Sladen
- From the Ballads to Brennan (1964) edited by T. Inglis Moore
- Bards in the Wilderness : Australian Colonial Poetry to 1920 (1970) edited by Adrian Mitchell and Brian Elliott
- The Penguin Book of Australian Verse (1972) edited by Harry Payne Heseltine
- The Poetical Works of Charles Harpur (1984) edited by Elizabeth Perkins
- Cross-Country : A Book of Australian Verse edited by John Barnes and Brian MacFarlane, Heinemann, 1988
- Charles Harpur, Selected Poetry and Prose (1986) edited by Michael Ackland
- A Collection of Australian Bush Verse (1989) edited by Peter Antill-Rose
- The Poet's Discovery : Nineteenth Century Australia in Verse (1990) edited by Richard Douglas Jordan and Peter Pierce
- The Penguin Book of 19th Century Australian Literature (1993) edited by Michael Ackland
- Australian Verse : An Oxford Anthology (1998) edited by John Leonard
- An Anthology of Australian Poetry to 1920 (2007) edited by John Kinsella
- The Puncher & Wattmann Anthology of Australian Poetry (2009) edited by John Leonard

== Notes ==
The version of the poem text is that found in The Poetical Works of Charles Harpur (1984) edited by Elizabeth Perkins.

== See also ==
- 1845 in poetry
- List of years in Australian literature
- Australian literature
