= The Swimmer (poem) =

Poem written by Adam Lindsay Gordon

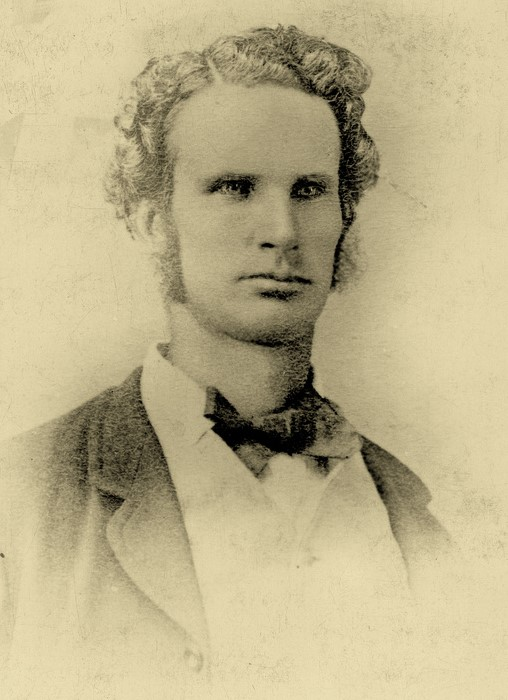
Adam Lindsay Gordon, c. 1860

"The Swimmer" is a poem by the Australian poet Adam Lindsay Gordon. The poem is from his last volume of poems Bush Ballads and Galloping Rhymes published in 1870, when he was living at Melbourne. In The Poems of Adam Lindsay Gordon, it is grouped among "Poems Swinburnian in Form and Pessimism, but full of the Personality of Gordon."

The poem was set to music by Edward Elgar as the fifth and last song in his song-cycle Sea Pictures.

== Lyrics ==
Square brackets [ ] indicate text omitted in Elgar's song. Italics indicate text repeated in the song.

"The Swimmer"

With short, sharp, violent lights made vivid,
To southward far as the sight can roam;
Only the swirl of the surges livid,
The seas that climb and the surfs that comb.
Only the crag and the cliff to nor'ward,
[And] the rocks receding, and reefs flung forward,
[And] waifs wrecked seaward and wasted shoreward
On shallows sheeted with flaming foam.

A grim, grey coast and a seaboard ghastly,
And shores trod seldom by feet of men -–
Where the battered hull and the broken mast lie,
They have lain embedded these long years ten.
Love! Love! when we wander'd here together,
Hand in hand! Hand in hand through the sparkling weather,
From the heights and hollows of fern and heather,
God surely loved us a little then.

The skies were fairer and shores were firmer --
The blue sea over the bright sand rolled;
Babble and prattle, and ripple and murmur,
Sheen of silver and glamour of gold –
Sheen of silver and glamour of gold -
[And the sunset bath'd in the gulf to lend her
A garland of pinks and of purples tender,
A tinge of the sun-god's rosy splendour,
A tithe of his glories manifold.]

[Man's works are graven, cunning, and skilful
On earth, where his tabernacles are;
But the sea is wanton, the sea is wilful,
And who shall mend her and who shall mar ?
Shall we carve success or record disaster
On the bosom of her heaving alabaster ?
Will her purple pulse beat fainter or faster
For fallen sparrow or fallen star ?]

[I would that with sleepy, soft embraces
The sea would fold me – would find me rest,
In luminous shades of her secret places,
In depths where her marvels are manifest;
So the earth beneath her should not discover
My hidden couch – nor the heaven above her –
As a strong love shielding a weary lover,
I would have her shield me with shining breast.]

[When light in the realms of space lay hidden,
When life was yet in the womb of time,
Ere flesh was fettered to fruits forbidden,
And souls were wedded to care and crime,
Was the course foreshaped for the future spirit –
A burden of folly, a void of merit –
That would fain the wisdom of stars inherit,
And cannot fathom the seas sublime ?]

[Under the sea or the soil (what matter ?
The sea and the soil are under the sun),
As in the former days in the latter
The sleeping or waking is known of none.
Surely the sleeper shall not awaken
To griefs forgotten or joys forsaken,
For the price of all things given and taken,
The sum of all things done and undone.]

[Shall we count offences or coin excuses,
Or weigh with scales the soul of a man,
Whom a strong hand binds and a sure hand looses,
Whose light is a spark and his life a span ?
The seed he sowed or the soil he cumbered,
The time he served or the space he slumbered;
Will it profit a man when his days are numbered,
Or his deeds since the days of his life began ?]

[One, glad because of the light, saith, 'Shall not
The righteous Judge of all the earth do right,
For behold the sparrows on the house-tops fall not
Save as seemeth to Him good in His sight ?'
And this man's joy shall have no abiding
Through lights departing and lives dividing,
He is soon as one in the darkness hiding,
One loving darkness rather than light.]

[A little season of love and laughter,
Of light and life, and pleasure and pain,
And a horror of outer darkness after,
And dust returneth to dust again.
Then the lesser life shall be as the greater,
And the lover of life shall join the hater,
And the one thing cometh sooner or later,
And no one knoweth the loss or gain.]

[Love of my life ! we had lights in season –
Hard to part from, harder to keep –
We had strength to labour and souls to reason,
And seed to scatter and fruits to reap.
Though time estranges and fate disperses,
We have had our loves and our loving-mercies;
Though the gifts of the light in the end are curses,
Yet bides the gift of the darkness – sleep !]

See ! girt with tempest and winged with thunder,
And clad with lightning and shod with sleet,
The strong winds treading the swift waves sunder
The flying rollers with frothy feet.
One gleam like a bloodshot sword-blade swims on
The skyline, staining the green gulf crimson,
A death stroke fiercely dealt by a dim sun,
That strikes through his stormy winding-sheet.

Oh ! brave white horses ! you gather and gallop,
The storm sprite loosens the gusty reins;
Oh! brave white horses! you gather and gallop,
The storm sprite loosens the gusty reins;
Now the stoutest ship were the frailest shallop
In your hollow backs, on your high arched manes.
I would ride as never [a] man has ridden
In your sleepy, swirling surges hidden,
I would ride as never man has ridden
To gulfs foreshadowed through straits forbidden,
Where no light wearies and no love wanes,
No love, where no love, no love wanes.

== Elgar's setting ==
In addition to the D major melody, Elgar incorporates music from earlier songs in the cycle: "Where Corals Lie" (at "God surely loved us a little then") and "Sea Slumber Song" (at "The skies were fairer").
