= Bush Ballads and Galloping Rhymes =

Book by Adam Lindsay Gordon

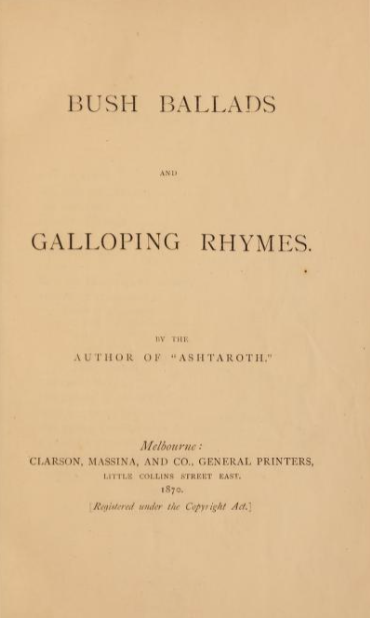
- Title page for Bush Ballads and Galloping Rhymes (1870)
- Author: Adam Lindsay Gordon
- Language: English
- Publisher: Clarson, Massina & Co.
- Publication date: 1870
- Media type: Print (hardback & paperback)
- Pages: 103 pp
- Preceded by: Sea Spray and Smoke Drift
- Followed by: Poems of the Late Adam Lindsay Gordon

Bush Ballads and Galloping Rhymes (1870) is the second poetry collection by Australian poet Adam Lindsay Gordon. It was also the last collection to be published during the poet's lifetime appearing only the day before the author's suicide.

The original collection included only 16 poems, though later editions expanded on this list. Most of the poems were published in the Australian newspapers Colonial Monthly and The Australasian.

== Contents ==
- "A Dedication"
- "The Sick Stockrider"
- "The Swimmer"
- "From the Wreck"
- "No Name"
- "Wolf and Hound"
- "De Te"
- "How We Beat the Favourite"
- "From The Road to Avernus"
- "Doubtful Dreams"
- "The Rhyme of Joyous Garde"
- "Thora's Song"
- "The Three Friends"
- "A Song of Autumn"
- "The Romance of Britomarte"
- "Laudamus"

== Critical reception ==
On its original publication a reviewer in The Argus, aware of the poet's recent death, wrote: "Mr. Gordon was a man of cultivated and refined mind, and of more than average literary taste and talent. It is more than probable that had he lived a few years longer he would have made for himself a reputation of no ordinary character. His ballads "Bush Ballads," as he called them — were spirited and rhythmical, instinct with the genius of the scenes that inspired them. Although he affected Swinburne and Browning, and drew considerably upon the storehouse of epithet and adjective which those gentlemen have left unlocked for the use of future generations, he displayed a natural vigour and force which trended upon, if it did not touch, originality.".

A reviewer in the Evening Journal from Adelaide did not hold back their critical view: "The writer is one who makes. To make he must be original, and the warmest of Mr. Gordon admirers must admit that originality was not his leading characteristic. A marvellous command of rhyme, a musical ear for rhythm, a power of saying what he meant to say forcibly and clearly, are, we should say, the three salient points in the character of the 'author of Ashtaroth.' Yet every here and there gleam out little specks and veins of gold, as in the dull common rock you may detect, if you are so fortunate, the slitter of the true metal; and it is the very presence of these precious morsels that is so surprising — how the same pen could at the same time produce so much that is good and so much that is utterly worthless."

== See also ==
- 1870 in Australian literature
- 1870 in poetry
