= Sea Spray and Smoke Drift =

1867 poetry collection by Adam Lindsay Gordon

- Title page of the 1876 edition
- Author: Adam Lindsay Gordon
- Language: English
- Publisher: George Robertson
- Publication date: 1867
- Publication place: Australia
- Media type: Print (hardback & paperback)
- Pages: 171pp
- Preceded by: –
- Followed by: Bush Ballads and Galloping Rhymes

Sea Spray and Smoke Drift (1867) is the first collection of poems by Australian poet Adam Lindsay Gordon. It was released in hardback by George Robertson in 1867.

The collection includes 27 poems by the author that are reprinted from various sources.

== Contents ==
- "Podas Okus"
- "Gone"
- "Unshaven"
- "Ye Wearie Wayfarer"
- "Borrow'd Plumes"
- "Pastor Cum"
- "A Legend of Madrid"
- "Fauconshawe"
- "Rippling Water"
- "Cui Bono"
- "Bellona"
- "The Song of the Surf"
- "Whisperings in Wattle Boughs"
- "Confiteor"
- "Sunlight on the Sea"
- "Delilah"
- "From Lightning and Tempest"
- "Wormwood and Nightshade"
- "Ars Longa"
- "The Last Leap"
- "Quare Fatigasti"
- Hippodromania
  - "Visions in the Smoke"
  - "The Fields of Coleraine"
  - "Craedat Judaeus Apella"
  - "Banker's Dream"
  - "Ex Fumo Dare Lucem"
- "The Roll of the Kettledrum; or, The Lay of the Last Charger"

== Critical reception ==
Reviewing a reissue of the collection in 1909 The Australasian found: "If Gordon is the poet of the horse, he may also be called the poet of the golden wattle. Considering how genuinely poetical and distinctive in tone is much of the contents of this volume, it seems strange that the book was so entirely ignored by the Australian public. But Gordon's fate was that of many another poet, cut off in his prime, and not properly estimated until appreciation was too late to be of much value."

In 1994 The Oxford Companion to Australian Literature noted "There are several ballads, e.g. 'The Roll of the Kettledrum', and some melancholy poems in which Gordon regrets his youthful follies and wasted opportunities. 'Hippodromania', a poem in five parts, is an indication of the importance of horses and horse-racing both to Gordon and to Australia."

== See also ==
- Full text of the 1867 edition at the State Library of Victoria
- 1867 in Australian literature
- 1867 in poetry
