= The Beautiful Squatter =

Poem by Australian poet Charles Harpur

- by Charles Harpur
- Original title: Squatter Songs No. 1
- First published in: The Weekly Register of Politics, Facts and General Literature
- Country: Australia
- Language: English
- Publication date: 15 March 1845

Full text
- The Beautiful Squatter at Wikisource

"The Beautiful Squatter" (1845) is a poem by Australian poet Charles Harpur.

It was originally published in The Weekly Register of Politics, Facts and General Literature on 15 March 1845, and was subsequently reprinted in the author's single-author collections and a number of Australian poetry anthologies.

== Publication history ==
After the poem's initial publication in The Weekly Register of Politics, Facts and General Literature newspaper in 1845 it was reprinted as follows:

- The Port Phillip Patriot and Morning Advertiser, 26 March 1845
- The Poetical Works of Charles Harpur edited by Elizabeth Perkins, Angus and Robertson, 1984
- The Penguin Book of Australian Satirical Verse edited by Philip Neilson, Penguin, 1986
- Old Ballads from the Bush edited by Bill Scott, Angus and Robertson, 1987
- The Penguin Book of Australian Ballads edited by Elizabeth Webby and Philip Butterss, Penguin, 1993
- The Sting in the Wattle : Australian Satirical Verse edited by Philip Neilsen, University of Queensland Press, 1993
- Australian Verse : An Oxford Anthology edited by John Leonard, Oxford University Press, 1998
- 100 Australian Poems You Need to Know edited by Jamie Grant, Hardie Grant, 2008
- The Puncher & Wattmann Anthology of Australian Poetry edited by John Leonard, Puncher & Wattmann, 2009

== See also ==
- 1845 in literature
- 1845 in poetry
