= 1870 in poetry =

This article covers 1870 in poetry. Nationality words link to articles with information on the nation's poetry or literature (for instance, Irish or France).

== Works published ==
=== United Kingdom ===
- Edward Lear, Nonsense Songs, stories, Botany, and Alphabets (published this year, although the book states "1871"; see also Book of Nonsense 1846, More Nonsense 1872, Laughable Lyrics 1877)
- William Morris, The Earthly Paradise, Part 4 (Parts 1 and 2 1868, Part 3 1869)
- Arthur O'Shaughnessy, An Epic of Women, and Other Poems
- Dante Gabriel Rossetti, Poems, including "Jenny" and a fragment of "The House of Life", exhumed from Elizabeth Siddal's grave
- James Joseph Sylvester, a mathematician, publishes The Laws of Verse
- Alfred Lord Tennyson, Idylls of the King with eight Idylls in the order Tennyson wanted at this point (see also Idylls of the King 1859, 1889, The Holy Grail 1869, "The Last Tournament" 1871, Gareth and Lynette 1872, "Balin and Balan" in Tiresias 1885)
- Augusta Webster, Portraits
- William Wordsworth, The Poetical Works of William Wordsworth: The Centenary Edition (see also Misfcellaneous Poems 1820, Poetical Works 1836, 1840, Poems 1845, Poetical Works 1857)

=== United States ===
- Bret Harte, Plain Language from Truthful James (a pirated edition titled The Heathen Chinee also appeared)
- James Russell Lowell, The Cathedral
- Epes Sargent, The Woman Who Dared

=== Other ===
- Estanislao del Campo, Collected Works, Spanish-language, Argentina
- Adam Lindsay Gordon, Bush Ballads and Galloping Rhymes, published the day before he died, Australia
- Comte de Lautréamont, pen name of Isidore Lucien Ducasse, Poésies, a prose work in two parts, the first on aesthetics and rejecting Romanticism, the second a collection of maxims rewritten to change their original meanings (see "Deaths" section, below)
- John Reade, Merlin's Prophecy and Other Poems, Canada.
- Giovanni Marradi, Canzone moderne, Italy

== Births ==
Death years link to the corresponding "[year] in poetry" article:

- January 6 – Helen Power (died 1957), Australian
- January 29 – Süleyman Nazif (died 1927), Turkish poet and politician
- March 4 – Thomas Sturge Moore (died 1944), English poet, author, playwright, artist and long-term friend of W. B. Yeats
- May 22 – Eva Gore-Booth (died 1926), Irish
- July 1 – Inoue Kenkabō 井上剣花坊 pen name of Inoue Koichi (died 1934), Japanese, late Meiji, Taishō and early Shōwa period journalist and writer of senryū (short, humorous verse); surname: Inoue
- July 27 – Hilaire Belloc (died 1953), French-born English writer whose "cautionary tales" (humorous poems with a moral) are the most widely known of his writing
- October 10 – Louise Mack (died 1935), Australian poet, journalist and novelist
- October 22 – Lord Alfred Douglas (died 1945), English minor Uranian poet best remembered as a lover of the writer Oscar Wilde
- November 1 – Christopher Brennan (died 1932), Australian
- November 27 – Damodar Botadkar (died 1924), Indian, Gujarati-language poet
- Also:
  - Va. Ba. Patavardhan (died 1921), Indian, Marathi-language critic and poet

== Deaths ==
Birth years link to the corresponding "[year] in poetry" article:

- January 25 – David Bates, 60, American poet
- April 24 – Louisa Stuart Costello (born 1799), English miniature-painter, poet, historical novelist and travel writer
- June 11 – William Gilmore Simms, 64, Southern American poet, novelist and historian
- June 24 – Adam Lindsay Gordon, 36, Australian poet and jockey
- July 24 – Anders Abraham Grafström, 80, Swedish poet and historian
- November 24 – Comte de Lautréamont, pen name of Isidore Lucien Ducasse (born 1846), French
- December 22 – Gustavo Adolfo Bécquer (born 1836), Spanish Andalusian poet and short-story writer
- Also:
  - William Livingston (Uilleam Macdhunleibhe) (born 1808), Scottish Gaelic poet
  - Rasul Mir, Indian, Kashmiri-language poet

== See also ==
- 19th century in poetry
- 19th century in literature
- List of years in poetry
- List of years in literature
- Victorian literature
- French literature of the 19th century
- Poetry
