= Charles de Boos =

Australian writer

Charles Edward Augustus de Boos (24 May 1819, in London, United Kingdom – 30 October 1900 Ryde, Australia) was an Australian journalist, police magistrate, mining warden and writer.

He was educated at Addiscombe. He served in the British Legion during the First Carlist War in Spain from 1835 to 1837, and emigrated to Australia in 1839.

He tried farming on the Hunter River but without success.

He then turned to journalism working first for The Monitor and then The Sydney Gazette. He went to Melbourne in 1851 where he was commissioned by The Argus to report on the Victorian goldfields.

Having been Government shorthand writer in Victoria (Australia) from 1851 to 1856, he became connected with the press, and removed to Sydney and joined the Sydney Morning Herald. de Boos was the author of numerous works, and was appointed Warden of the New South Wales Goldfields in December 1874. He afterwards retired on a pension.

== Publications ==
- Random Notes by a Wandering Reporter (1871)
- The Congewoi Correspondence, 'letters of Mr. John Smith edited by Mr. Chas De Boos' (1874)
- Fifty Years Ago: An Australian Tale, serial
