= Ann and Amelia (1816 ship) =

History

United Kingdom
- Name: Ann and Amelia
- Owner: Cruttenden; Joseph Somes, London
- Builder: James Macrae, Chittagong
- Launched: 1816
- Fate: Wrecked 1835

General characteristics
- Tons burthen: 553, or 576, or 587 (bm)
- Sail plan: Ship
- Complement: 30

Ann and Amelia was launched in 1816 at Chittagong. She was sold at Calcutta in August 1823 for a "Free Trader". She transported convicts from Britain to Port Jackson, New South Wales, in 1825. She then made three voyages for the British East India Company (EIC) and was lost in gale on the coast of France in 1835 as she was finishing her third voyage.

== Career ==
Initially, i.e., between 1816 and 1823, Ann and Amelia participated in the local trade in India and the Far East.

Ann and Amelia was sold at Calcutta in August 1823 for a "Free Trader". On 14 September, Ann and Amelia, under the command of Captain Joseph Short, left Calcutta, bound for Britain. She left Bengal on 3 October, was at Madras on 19 October, and arrived at Gravesend on 18 March 1824. Lloyd's Register for 1824 shows the change of ownership from Cruttenden to Somes & Co., the change of master from I. Short to Ascough, and her trade as London-Bengal. The next year her trade changed to London-New South Wales.

=== Convict transport (1824–25) ===
Captain William Ascough sailed from Cork on 8 September 1824, bound for Sydney, New South Wales. Ann and Amelia arrived 2 January 1825. She had embarked some 200 male prisoners (including Jack Donahue) and 200 disembarked in Sydney. The 40th Regiment of Foot provided the guard detachment.

Ann and Amelia returned to Britain via Singapore and Penang. She was at Deal by 2 November. The next day there was a tremendous gale. She lost her anchor and chain and had to cut away her mainmast while in the "Nob Channel" in order to ride out the gale.

The EIC then chartered her for several trips from London to the Indies and China.

=== EIC voyage #1 (1826–27) ===
Captain Henry William Ford left The Downs on 10 June 1826, bound for China and Quebec. Ann and Amelia arrived at Whampoa on 11 December. She then arrived at Quebec on 10 June 1827, before returning to her moorings in Britain on 14 September.

=== EIC voyage #2 (1830–31) ===
Captain William Richards left The Downs on 3 June 1830, bound for China, Halifax, and Quebec. Ann and Amelia reached Whampoa on 3 December. She then was at Lintin on 24 January 1831, and reached St Helena on 3 April. She arrived at Halifax on 18 May, and Quebec on 8 June. She returned to her moorings on 26 August.

=== EIC voyage #3 (1832 to loss) ===
Captain William Compton left Portsmouth on 17 August 1832, bound for Bengal. Ann and Amelia reached the Cape on 17 August, and arrived at the Hooghli River from "London and the Cape" on 23 December. Homeward bound, she was at Saugor, on 22 January 1833, and reached St Helena on 22 June. She was almost home when a gale drove her onshore on 1 September, at Berck, near Boulogne-sur-Mer, with the loss of four of her 30 crew. She was so damaged she had to be abandoned.
