= The Australasian Chronicle =

Newspaper in Sydney, NSW, Australia, active 1839–1846

- Type: Twice-weekly newspaper
- Format: Broadsheet
- Founder: John Polding
- Publisher: Andrew Bent
- Editor: W.A. Duncan
- Staff writers: Rev. John McEncroe; Michael D’Arcy; E.J. Hawksley
- Founded: August 2, 1839
- Ceased publication: October 7, 1846
- Language: English
- City: Sydney, New South Wales
- Country: Australia
- Sister newspapers: The Catholic Weekly
- ISSN: 1837-3399

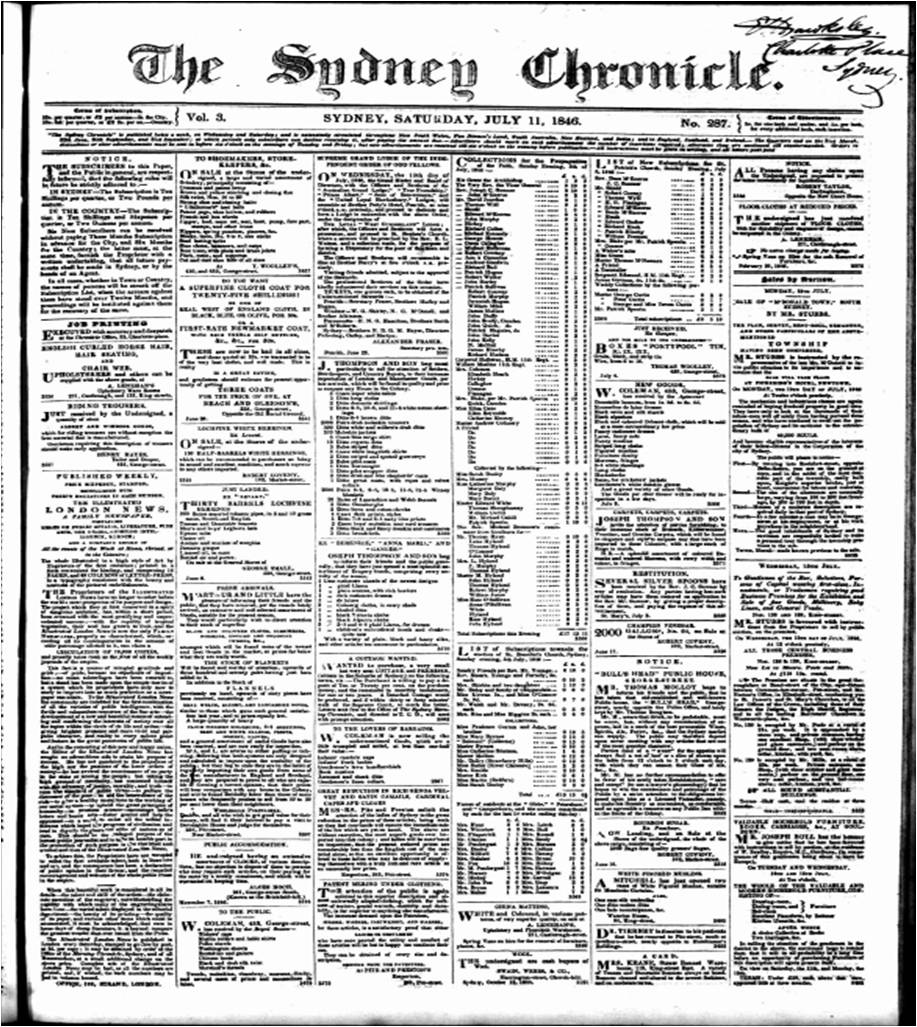
Image of front page of the paper under one of its later titles, The Sydney Chronicle

The Australasian Chronicle was a twice-weekly Catholic newspaper published in Sydney, New South Wales, Australia. It was published in a broadsheet format. It was also published as The Morning Chronicle, The Chronicle and The Sydney Chronicle. It was the first Catholic newspaper published in Australia.

== History ==
First published on 2 August 1839, The Australasian Chronicle was published by Andrew Bent, for William Augustine Duncan, from 1839 to 1843. Its stated aim was "to explain and uphold the civil and religious principles of the Catholics, and to maintain their rights". The paper was started by Bishop Polding, OSB, and a learned Scottish immigrant, Duncan, a convert to Catholicism. It engaged in vigorous controversies in defence of Catholic interests. It had several name changes to The Morning Chronicle, The Chronicle and The Sydney Chronicle. It was eventually superseded by The Freeman's Journal which commenced publication on 27 June 1850.

Duncan was followed as editor by the Rev. John McEncroe and after him came McEncroe’s nephew Michael D’Arcy. Trove lists Edward John Hawksley as the editor in 1848, just prior to him starting his own newspaper, The People's Advocate and New South Wales Vindicator.

The publication defended Governor Gipps against attacks from the squatters, and denounced the ill-treatment of Aborigines.

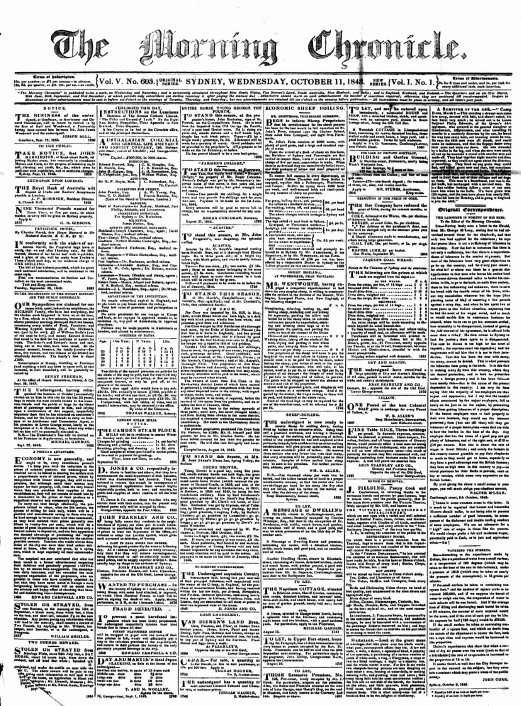
Cover page of The Morning Chronicle, 11 October 1843

== Digitisation ==
The paper has been digitised as part of the Australian Newspapers Digitisation Program, a project of the National Library of Australia in cooperation with the State Library of New South Wales.

== See also ==
- List of newspapers in Australia
- List of newspapers in New South Wales
