= Charles Harpur =

Australian poet and playwright (1813–1868)

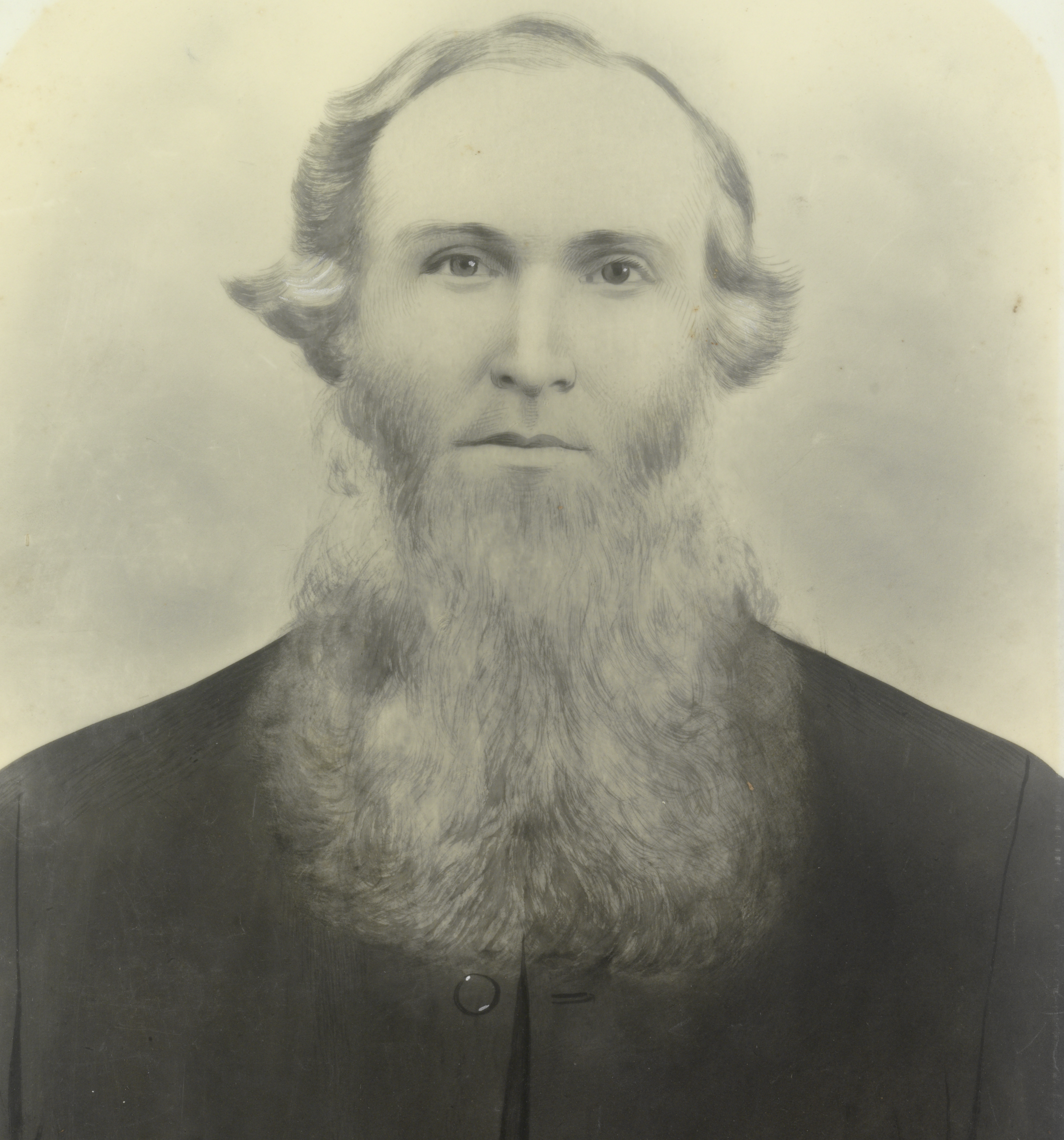
- Portrait of Charles Harpur, c. 1860
- Born: Charles Harpur; 23 January 1813; Windsor, New South Wales
- Died: 10 June 1868 (aged 55); Eurobodalla, New South Wales
- Occupations: teacher, farmer, writer
- Writing career
- Notable works: "The Creek of the Four Graves", "A Mid-Summer Noon in the Australian Forest"

Charles Harpur (23 January 1813 – 10 June 1868) was an Australian poet and playwright. He is regarded as "Australia's most important nineteenth-century poet."

== Life ==
=== Early life on the Hawkesbury ===
Harpur was born on 23 January 1813 at Windsor, New South Wales. His parents were convicts. His father, Joseph Harpur, was originally from Kinsale, County Cork, Ireland. He had been sentenced to transportation for highway robbery in March 1800; at the time of Harpur's birth, he was parish clerk and master of the Windsor district school. His mother, Sarah Chidley, was originally from Somerset, and had been sentenced to transportation in 1805. Harpur presumably went to school in Windsor, but little information about his education is available. Later in life, he claimed that he taught himself the principles of English verse by obsessively reading William Shakespeare.

=== Sydney and first publications ===
In the early 1830s, Harpur seems to have moved between Sydney and the Hunter Valley, but by 1833 he had settled with his parents in Sydney. At this time he began to publish his writings in newspapers. His earliest known publications were the poems 'An Australian Song' and 'At the Grave of Clements', which appeared in The Currency Lad on the 4th and 11 May 1833. In February 1835 he published parts of his first play, The Tragedy of Donohoe, in The Sydney Monitor, a radical newspaper edited by Edward Smith Hall. Harpur would continue to publish in newspapers throughout his life, eventually publishing hundreds of works in this manner.

In Sydney, Harpur worked as a clerk and letter-sorter in the Post Office, while pursuing a career in the theatre. He acted in three plays at the Theatre Royal in October 1833: The Mutiny at the Nore by Douglas Jerrold, The Miller and His Men by Isaac Pocock, and The Tragedy of Chrononhotonthologos, a farce. His acting career ended ignominiously, when he unsuccessfully sued Barnett Levey, the proprietor of the Theatre Royal, for unpaid wages. His career at the Post Office ended equally poorly, after he quarrelled with the Postmaster-General.

During these years, Harpur befriended many of Sydney's prominent literary and political figures, including Henry Parkes, Daniel Deniehy, and W. A. Duncan. Looking back at the end of his life, Parkes traced the development of his radical politics back to this circle of friends:

I had now formed the acquaintance of two men of more than ordinary character and ability, Mr. Charles Harpur, one of the most genuine of Australian poets, and Mr. William Augustine Duncan, then proprietor and editor of the 'Weekly Register.' They were my chief advisers in matters of intellectual resource and enquiry, when the prospect before me was opening and widening, often with many cross lights and drifting clouds, but ever with deepening radiance.

In 1988, as part of Australia's bicentennial celebrations, a plaque was laid at the site of Harpur's grave (36.139122°S 149.981022°E), describing him as "Australia’s first native born poet".

== Work ==
=== Textual history ===
Harpur continually revised, redrafted and republished his works throughout his life, creating an "editorial nightmare". In all he is credited with over 700 poems, which exist in some 2,700 distinct versions. His major play, The Tragedy of Donohoe, exists in four distinct versions, with different titles, plots and names for the characters. Many of his works exist only in manuscript, or lie scattered among dozens of newspapers and journals. In the past, this hindered research into Harpur's work, because only a small portion was available in reliable and accessible texts. In the twentieth century, however, editors such as Charles Salier, Elizabeth Perkins and Michael Ackland greatly improved the situation, by publishing wide selections of Harpur's poetry in book form. In the twenty-first century, Paul Eggert embarked on an ambitious project to make every version of every Harpur poem available online, along with tools to examine Harpur's complex process of rewriting. The fruit of this project was the Charles Harpur Critical Archive, the first variorum edition of Harpur's poetry.

=== Description of the bush ===
... [T]he Poet, in picturing nature, should never pin himself to the particular, or to the locally present. ... [H]e should paint her primarily through his imagination; and thus the striking features and colors of many scenes, which lie permanently gathered in his memory, becoming, with their influences, idealised in the process, will be essentially transfused up a few, or even upon one scene—one happy embodiment of her wildest freaks, or one Eden-piece embathed with a luminous atmosphere of sentiment. ... Thus it is truth sublimated, compressed, epitomised ...

— Charles Harpur, Preface to "The Kangaroo Hunt" (1866-67)

Many of Harpur's poems describe the Australian bush. Scholars have praised the accuracy and variety of his natural descriptions, while also critiquing his tendency to 'gothicise' the Australian landscape. In 'gothicising' poems such as "The Creek of the Four Graves", Harpur depicts the Australian landscape as dark, strange, wild and exotic. Some scholars argue that this gothic depiction of the Australian landscape implies that Australia was a terra nullius, and that Harpur's poetry therefore supports the expropriation of Aboriginal lands. In other poems, however, Harpur presents a more positive view of the Australian bush. In "The Kangaroo Hunt," Harpur invokes an Aboriginal deity as his Muse, while in "Aboriginal Death Song", he makes explicit reference to Aboriginal sovereignty over land within their "borders". Observing these different strains in his poetry, some scholars argue that Harpur's nature poetry is ironic; rather than describing nature from his own perspective, Harpur's poetry describes how nature appears from the point of view of different characters.

Harpur underpinned his nature poetry with a sophisticated theory of natural description. This theory relied on two central principles. The first principle was personal experience: in his poetry, Harpur describes the Australian bush based on his own observations and interactions with Aboriginal people. He accurately describes the appearance and behaviour of many bird species in his poetry, for example, and refers to animals by their Indigenous names. The second principle was "sublimation" or "compression": rather than describing a particular scene, the poet should combine many observations together to give a complete picture of nature at different times. Through such "sublimation" or "compression", the poet could reveal the workings of the human mind, and expose the spiritual or divine aspect of the natural world.

== Bibliography ==
=== Books ===
- Thoughts: A Series of Sonnets (1845)
- The Bushrangers, a Play in Five Acts, and Other Poems (1853)

=== Pamphlets ===
- Songs of Australia (1850)
- A Poet's Home (1862)

=== Posthumous Editions ===
- Poems (1883)
- Selected Poems of Charles Harpur (1944)
- Rosa: Love Sonnets to Mary Doyle (1948)
- Charles Harpur edited by Donovan Clarke (1963)
- Charles Harpur edited by Adrian Mitchell (1973)
- Early Love Poems (1979)
- The Poetical Works of Charles Harpur edited by Elizabeth Perkins (1984) ISBN 0207147728
- Charles Harpur, Selected Poetry and Prose edited by Michael Ackland (1986) ISBN 9780140075885
- Stalwart the Bushranger, with, The Tragedy of Donohoe edited by Elizabeth Perkins (1987) ISBN 0868191841
- A Storm in the Mountains and Lost in the Bush (2006) ISBN 0977575845
- Charles Harpur Critical Archive edited by Paul Eggert (2019) ISBN 9781743326831

==== Selected list of poems ====
Title	Year	First published	Reprinted/collected in
"The Dream by the Fountain"	1843	The Australasian Chronicle, 10 June 1843	Poems, George Robertson, 1883, pp. 136–140
"The Beautiful Squatter"	1845	The Weekly Register of Politics, Facts and General Literature, 15 March 1845	The Poetical Works of Charles Harpur, edited by Elizabeth Perkins, Angus and Robertson, 1984, p. 63
"The Creek of the Four Graves"	1845	The Weekly Register of Politics, Facts and General Literature, 9, 16 and 23 August 1845	The Bushrangers, a Play in Five Acts, and Other Poems, W. R. Piddington, 1853, pp. 63–70
"A Mid-Summer Noon in the Australian Forest"	1851	The Empire, 27 May 1851	Poems, George Robertson, 1883, pp. 118–119
"A Storm in the Mountains"	1856	The Empire, 15 July 1856	Poems, George Robertson, 1883, pp. 77–84
"A Coast View"	1857	The Empire, 28 March 1857	The Poetical Works of Charles Harpur, edited by Elizabeth Perkins, Angus and Robertson, 1984, pp. 260–263

=== Other individual poems ===
- "Andrew Marvell" (1845)
- "The Anchor" (1855)
- "A Similitude" (1855)
- "To My Infant Daughter 'Ada'" (1861)
- "Love" (1907)
- "Words" (1907)

Nature

- The Cloud (1857)
- To an Echo on the Banks of the Hunter (1846)
- On Leaving x x x, after a residence there of several Months.
- The Bush Fire
- The Scenic Part of Poetry

Indigenous Australians

- A Wail from the Bush (1845)

Poetic craft

- The Nevers of Poesy (1857)
- The Poverty of Greatness (1845)
- On Completing a Book (1851)

Politics

- The Great Change (1850)
- The Tree of Liberty (1846)
- Australia, Huzza! (1833)
- A War-Song for the Nineteenth Century (1843)
- This Southern Land of Ours (1855)
- Is Wentworth a Patriot? (1845)

Love

- The Lass of Eulengo
- Love is simple
- The Tortures of Love (1844)
- To Ellen (1856)

Religion

- Trust in God (1853)

Teetotalism

- The Spirit of the Bowl (1854)
- The Merit of Sobriety (1857)

Ballads

- Alan of the Mill

Epigrams

- To a Girl Who Stole an Apple Tree
- Whatever is, is Right(?)
- The World's Way
- Neither will do
- Finish of Style
- Evasion
- Shortness of Life (1856)

Unusual subjects

- The Beautiful (1857)
- Farewel (1846)
- The Infinite in Space (1866)
