= Adam Lindsay Gordon =

British-Australian poet, horseman, police officer and politician

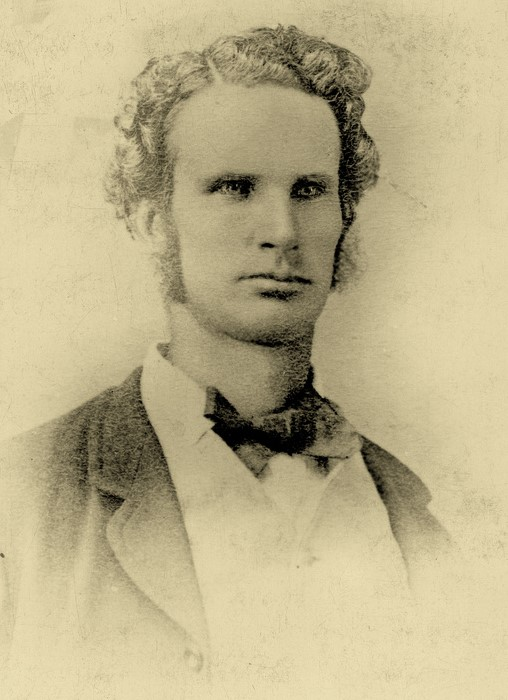
- Gordon, c. 1860
- Born: 19 October 1833; Charlton Kings, England
- Died: 24 June 1870 (aged 36); Melbourne, Victoria, Australia
- Burial place: Brighton General Cemetery
- Occupations: Poet, balladist, politician

Adam Lindsay Gordon (19 October 1833 – 24 June 1870) was a British-Australian poet, horseman, police officer and politician. He was the first Australian poet to gain considerable recognition overseas, and according to his contemporary, writer Marcus Clarke, Gordon's work represented "the beginnings of a national school of Australian poetry".

== Early life ==
Though commonly cited as having been born in Fayal in the Azores, where Captain Gordon had brought his wife for the sake of her health, Gordon's birthplace was the small English village of Charlton Kings near Cheltenham, where he was baptised. He was the son of Captain Adam Durnford Gordon and Harriet Gordon, his first cousin, both of whom were descended from Adam Gordon of Auchindoun, of the ballad "Edom o Gordon". Captain Gordon had retired from the Bengal cavalry and taught Hindustani. His mother's family had owned slaves in the British West Indies until the abolition of slavery in the 1830s, and had received significant financial compensation for the loss of their property. In 1859, Gordon inherited some £7,000 from his mother's estate.

Gordon was sent to Cheltenham College in 1841, when he was only seven but, after he had been there a year, he was sent to a school run by the Rev. Samuel Ollis Garrard in Gloucestershire. He attended the Royal Military Academy, Woolwich, in 1848, where he was a contemporary and friend of Charles George Gordon (no relation, later Gordon of Khartoum) and Thomas Bland Strange (later known as Gunner Jingo). Like Richard Henry Horne, he was asked to leave. Gordon was again admitted to Cheltenham College.

Gordon was then sent to the Royal Grammar School Worcester in 1852. In 1853, with a letter of introduction to the governor, Gordon joined the mounted police.

== To Australia ==
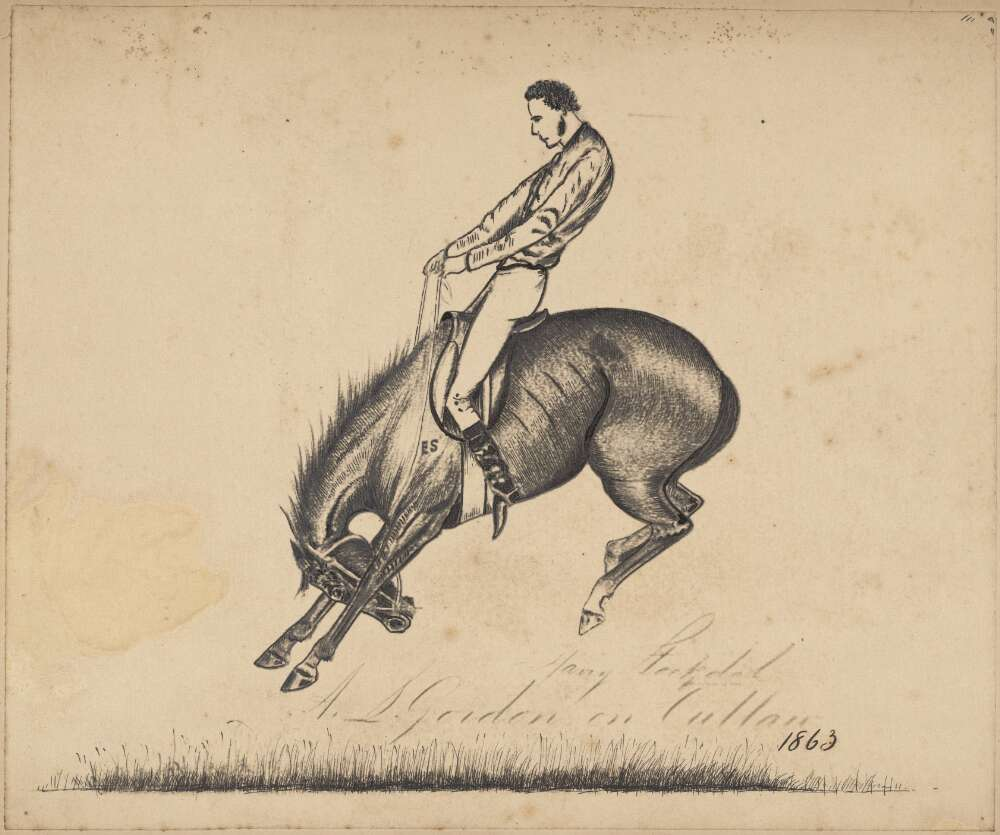
Gordon riding Outlaw, 1863

Adam Lindsay Gordon also acted as groom for a period to senior South Australian Police Officer Alexander Tolmer.

On 6 August 1859, the ship Admella ran aground on the Cape Northumberland shoals, not a great distance from where Gordon is known to have been staying. The ship broke up, many perished (see main article), and many heroic feats were attempted, including an epic horse ride to Mount Gambier to summon help. Some 10 years later, Gordon wrote a poem "From the Wreck", probably inspired by this story, but somehow the popular imagination put Gordon in that saddle, and a number of newspaper articles were written to debunk the myth.

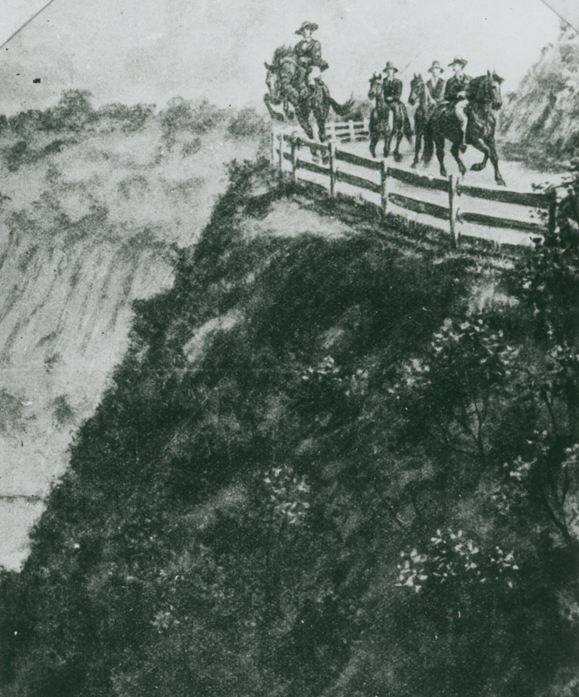
Gordon's Leap at Blue Lake, 1864

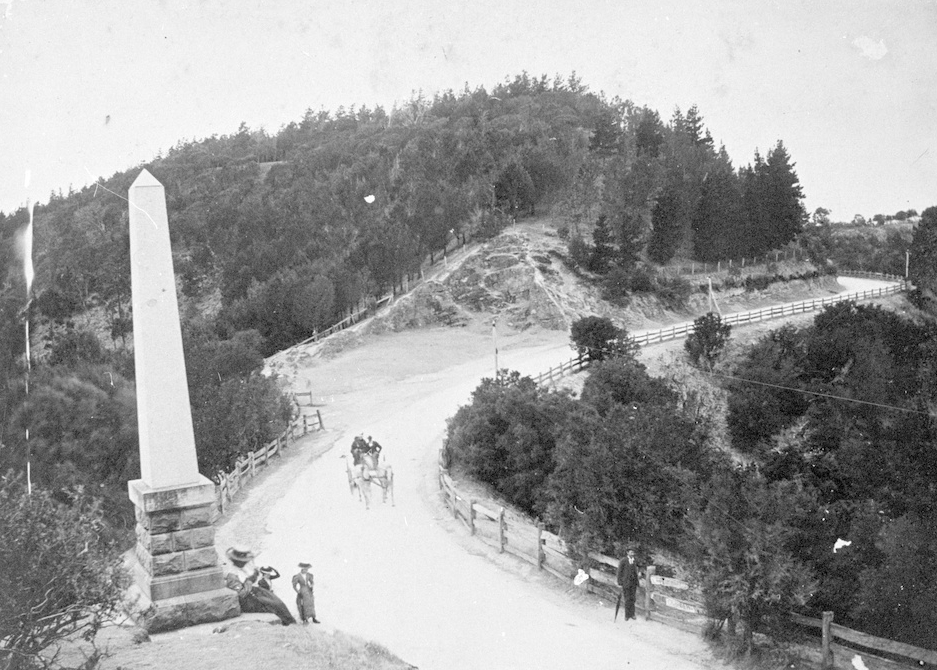
Monument erected at Blue Lake in 1887, commemorating Gordon's Leap

In July 1864, Gordon performed the daring riding feat known as Gordon's Leap on the edge of the Blue Lake. A commemorative obelisk erected there has an inscription which reads:

This obelisk was erected as a memorial to the famous Australian poet. From near this spot in July, 1864, Gordon made his famed leap on horseback over an old post and rail guard fence onto a narrow ledge overlooking the Blue Lake and jumped back again onto the roadway. The foundation stone of the Gordon Memorial Obelisk was laid on 8th July 1887.

He was elected by three votes to the South Australian House of Assembly on 16 March 1865 for the district of Victoria. In politics, Gordon was a maverick. His semiclassical speeches were colourful and entertaining, but largely irrelevant, and he resigned his seat on 10 November 1866. He found a good friend in wealthy fellow parliamentarian John Riddoch of Penola, and was a frequent guest at his grand residence "Yallum". There he wrote "The Sick Stockrider".

Gordon's time in politics stimulated him to greater activity – poetry, horse racing, and speculation.

== Move to Victoria ==
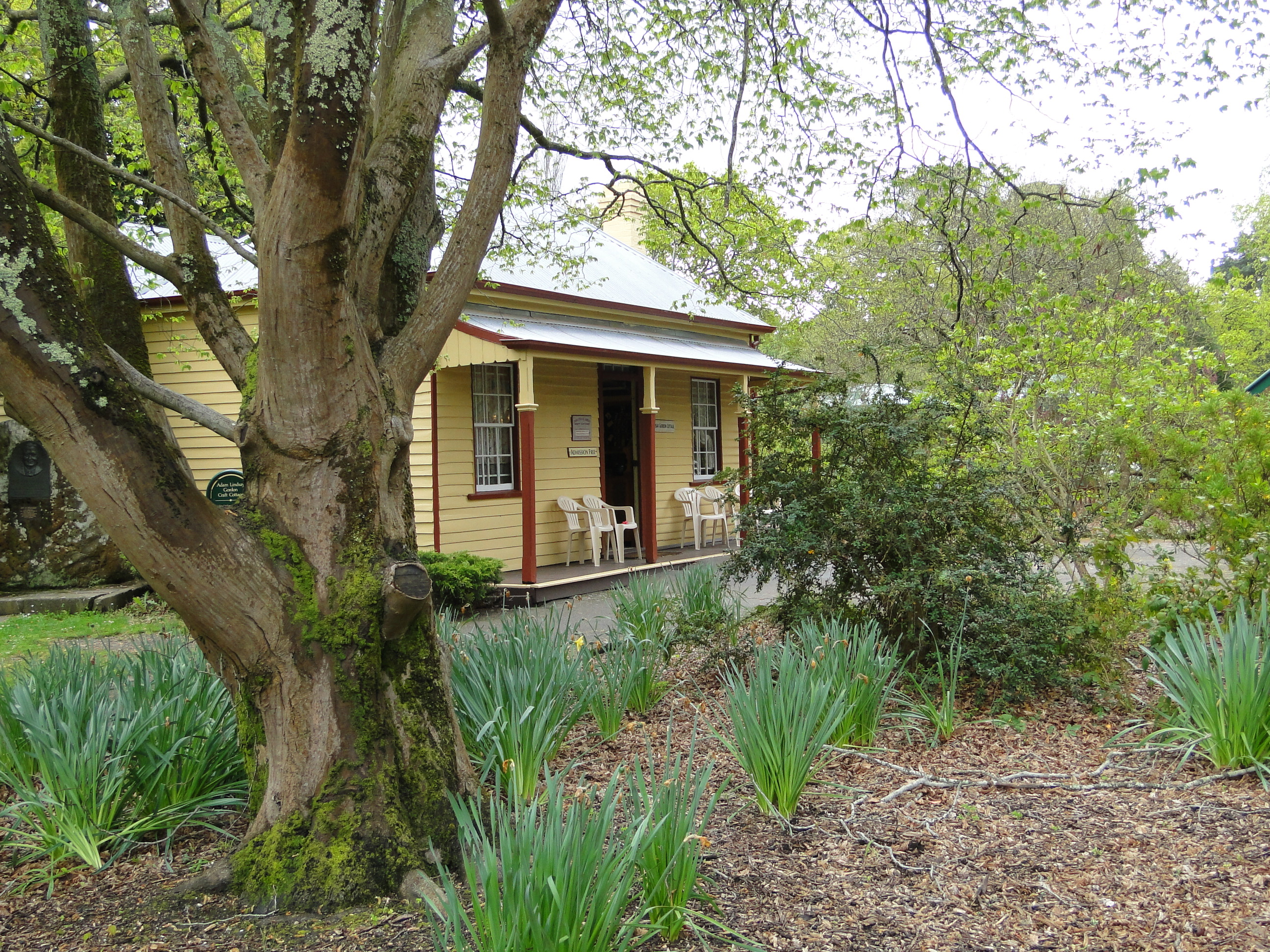
Gordon's Ballarat cottage, relocated from Craig's Hotel to the Ballarat Botanical Gardens

With his failures behind him, Gordon turned to Victoria, not to Melbourne, which had ignored his poetry, but to Ballarat.

DNA evidence revealed a possible child of Gordon's that was adopted by his good friends, however it is possible this child was an illegitimate offspring of a different one of Gordon's relatives.

=== Death ===
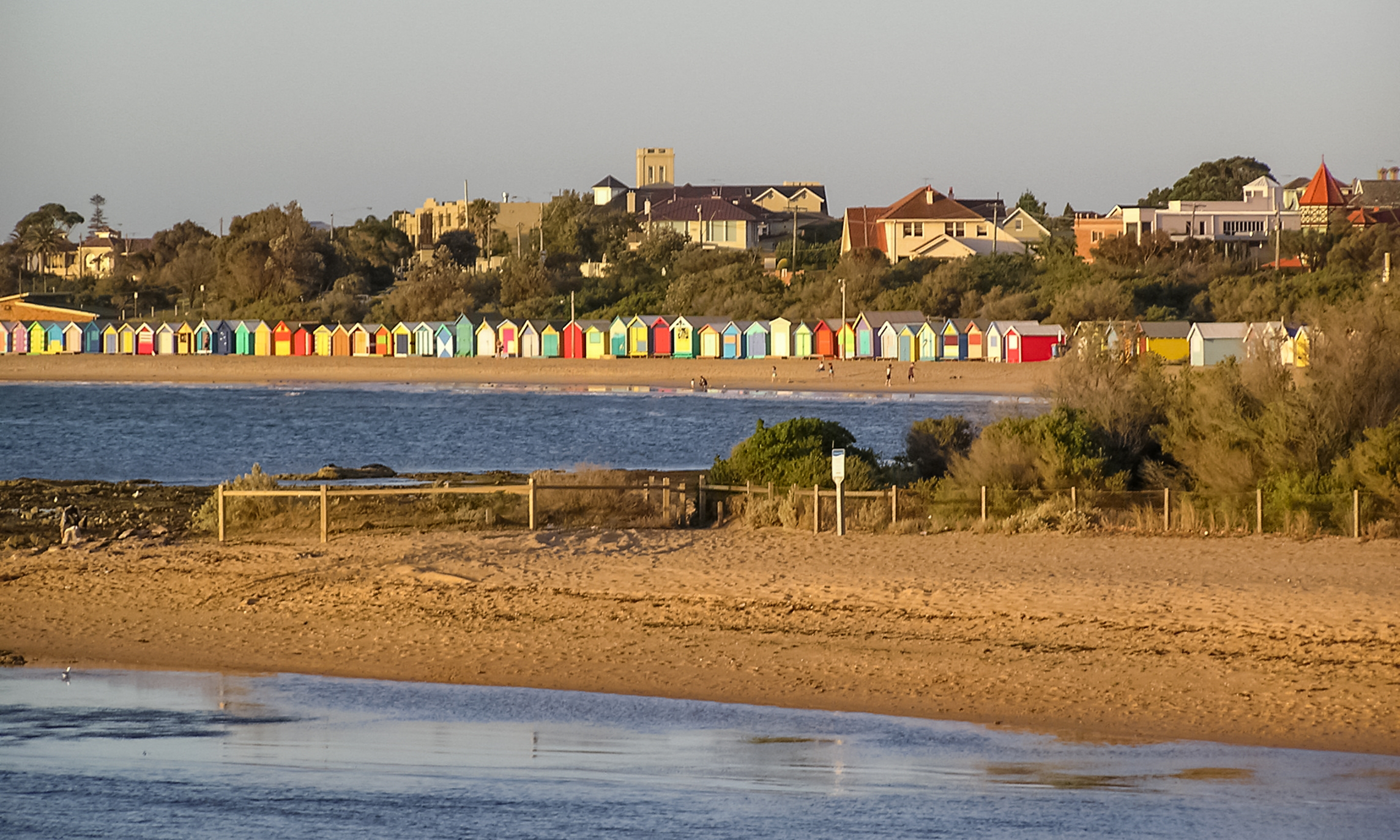
Brighton Beach, the site of Gordon's death

Bush Ballads and Galloping Rhymes was not successful at the time, but is now regarded as one of the most important pieces of Australian literature.

Gordon committed suicide early on the morning of June 24, 1870. He shot himself in the head with a rifle among the scrub behind the sandhills of Brighton Beach in Melbourne.

In October 1870, a monument was erected over his grave at the Brighton General Cemetery by his close friends.

== Legacy ==
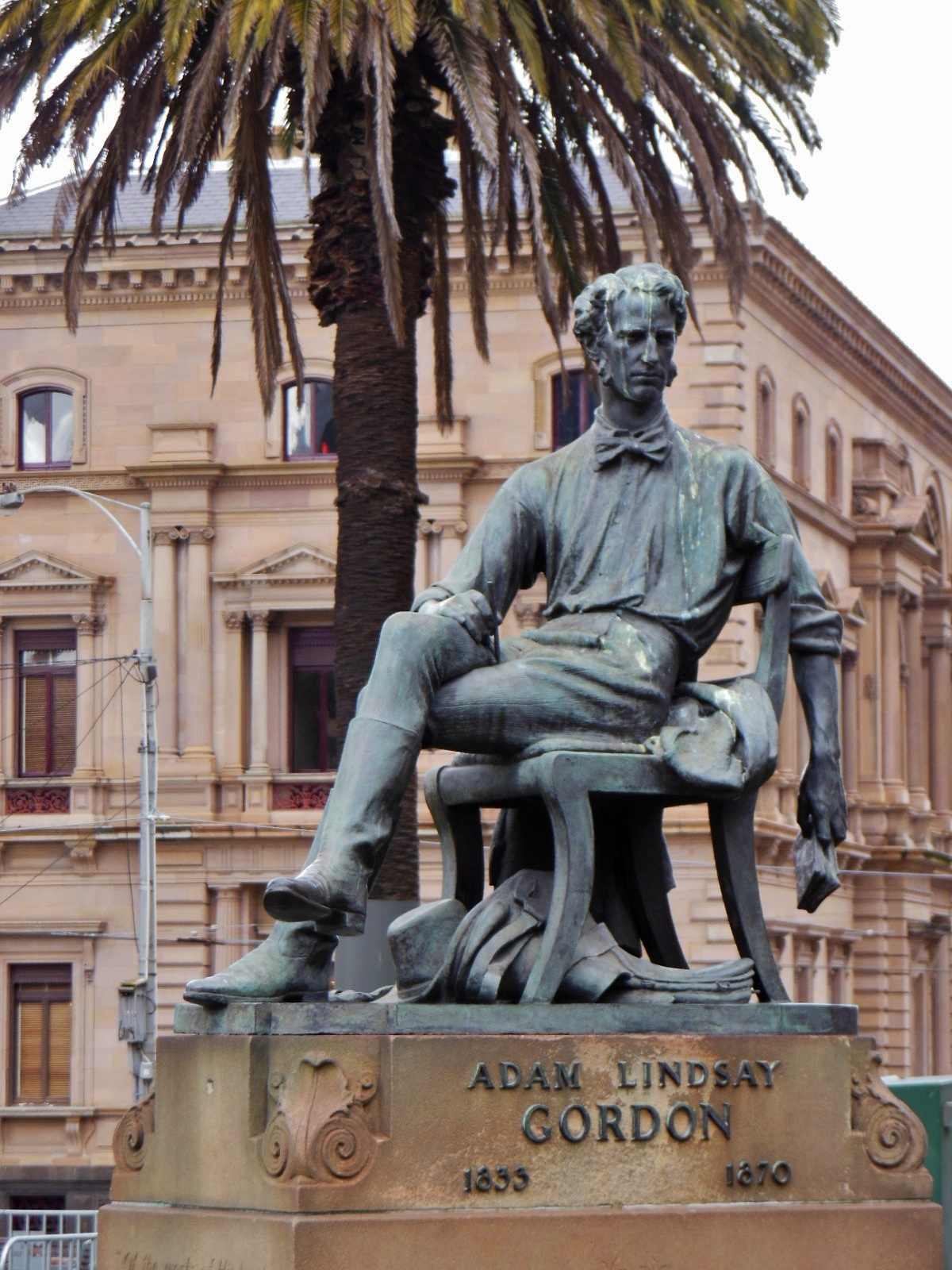
Statue of Gordon in Melbourne. Carved beneath are the following lines from "Ye Wearie Wayfarer": "Life is mostly froth and bubble / Two things stand like stone / Kindness in another's trouble / Courage in your own".

In the decades following Gordon's death, his work continued to draw increasing praise from literary figures and the public at large, and especially in Melbourne, he was exalted as a genius and a national poet. Arthur Conan Doyle and Oscar Wilde counted among his admirers, the latter hailing him as "one of the finest poetic singers the English race has ever known". Gordon's reputation peaked in the 1930s, during which time statues and monuments to his memory were erected throughout Australia and Britain. On 30 October 1932, a statue of Gordon by Paul Montford was unveiled near Parliament House, Melbourne, in a garden now known as Gordon Reserve; and in May 1934, his bust was placed in Poets' Corner, Westminster Abbey, and he remains the only Australian poet commemorated there.

Over time, the praise he received resulted in a backlash. George Bernard Shaw jokes about Gordon's verse in his 1949 play Shakes versus Shav, a dialogue between Shakespeare and himself during which Shakespeare laughs at a line attributed to Gordon. Critics dismissed some of Gordon's poetry as careless and banal.

His life was dramatised in the 1947 radio drama A Horseman in Arcadia and 1948 radio drama Adam Lindsay Gordon in which Peter Finch played the title role.

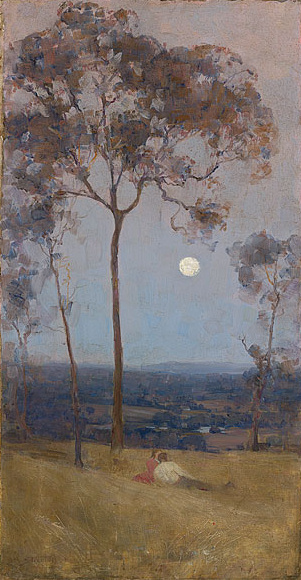
Arthur Streeton's Above Us the Great Grave Sky (1890)

Gordon's works have inspired numerous works in other artistic mediums. The Australian impressionists of the 1880s and 1890s were said to fuel the "Gordon craze", titling a number of their landscapes after lines from Gordon, including The Dawn Faintly Dappled (Charles Conder), Above Us the Great Grave Sky (Arthur Streeton) and Whisperings in Wattle Boughs (Frederick McCubbin). In 1886, inspired by a paper titled "The Open Air Elements in Gordon's Poems", members of the Melbourne bohemian artists' society the Buonarotti Club illustrated studies of his poetry.

Hugh McCrae as Gordon in the 1916 biopic The Life's Romance of Adam Lindsay Gordon

Film director W. J. Lincoln based two films on poems by Gordon: The Wreck (1913) and The Sick Stockrider (1915). He also directed the 1916 biopic The Life's Romance of Adam Lindsay Gordon, starring Hugh McCrae in the title role. Unlike many other early Australian silent films, much of the film survives today. One of Gordon's poems, "The Swimmer", forms the libretto for the fifth movement of English composer Sir Edward Elgar's song cycle Sea Pictures, and Elgar also set to music another of his poems, "A Song of Autumn". Composer Varney Monk set three of her songs to Gordon's poems.

After a particularly trying year for the British Royal Family, Elizabeth II quoted from one of Gordon's more famous poems in her Christmas Message of 1992, "Kindness in another's trouble, courage in one's own", but did not mention the poet's name. The same, full poem was also quoted by Diana, Princess of Wales during a speech in Washington, D.C. in 1996.

Dingley Dell, Gordon's property and home from 1862 to 1866, are preserved as a conservation park and as a museum. The museum houses early volumes of his work, personal effects, and a display of his horse-riding equipment.

In 1970, Gordon was honoured on a postage stamp bearing his portrait issued by Australia Post.

On 20 September 2014, Gordon was inducted in the Australian Jumps Racing Association's Gallery of Champions.

The suburb Gordon in Canberra, Australia's capital, is named after Gordon.

== Poetry collections ==
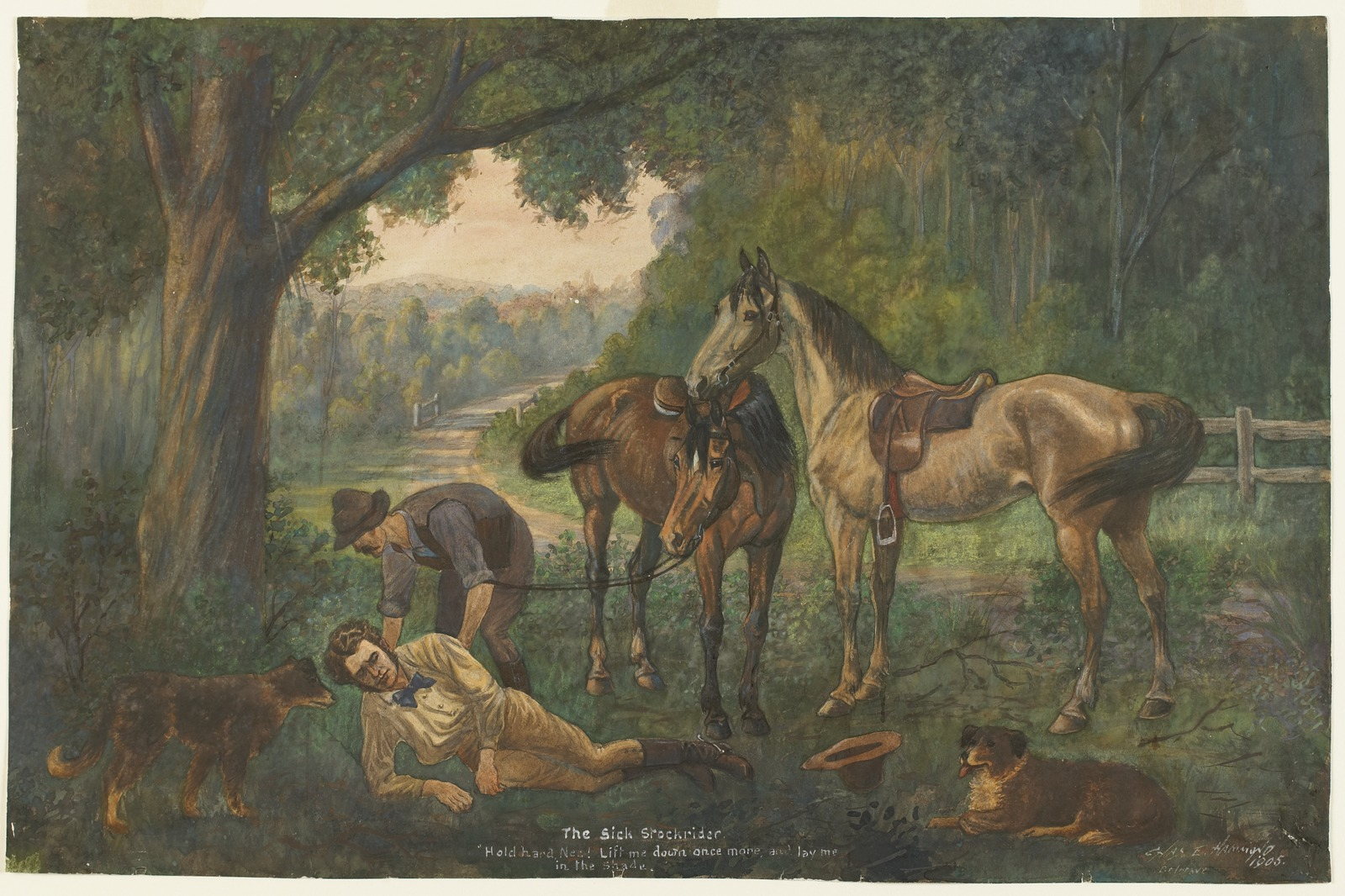
An early 20th-century postcard based on "The Sick Stockrider" shows Gordon as the poem's dying speaker.

- Sea Spray and Smoke Drift (1867)
- Bush Ballads and Galloping Rhymes (1870)
- Poems of the Late Adam Lindsay Gordon (1879)
- Racing Rhymes and Other Verses (1901)

== Selected list of poems ==
Title	Year	First published	Reprinted/collected in
"The Sick Stockrider"	1870	Colonial Monthly, January 1870	Bush Ballads and Galloping Rhymes, Clarson, Massina & Co., 1870, pp.13–17
"The Swimmer"	1870		Bush Ballads and Galloping Rhymes, Clarson, Massina & Co., 1870, pp.18–22

== Other ==
- "A Song of Autumn" (1868) (Gordon poem set to music by Edward Elgar)
- Poetry by Adam Lindsay Gordon was set to music by French-Australian musician Theodore Tourrier (1846-1929) in 1904

== See also ==
- Australian literature
- Yorick Club (Melbourne)
- The Life's Romance of Adam Lindsay Gordon
