= Douglas Sladen =

English author and academic

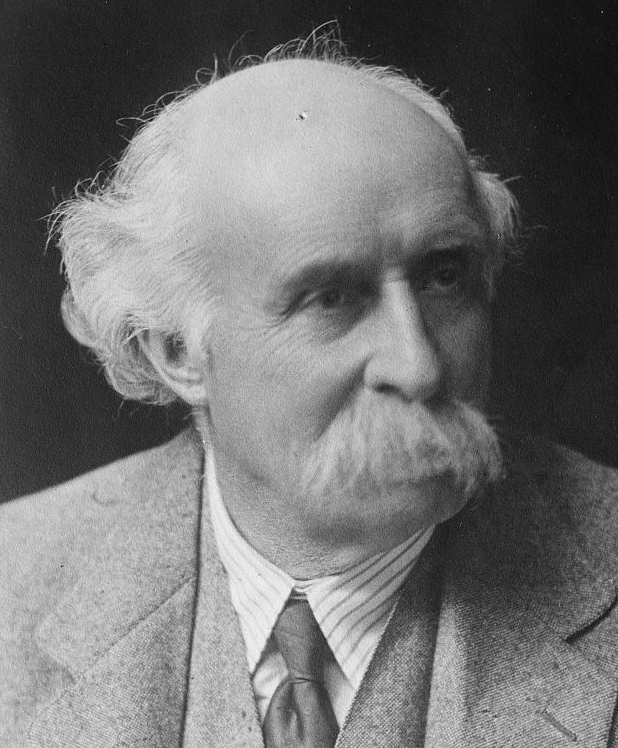
Douglas Sladen

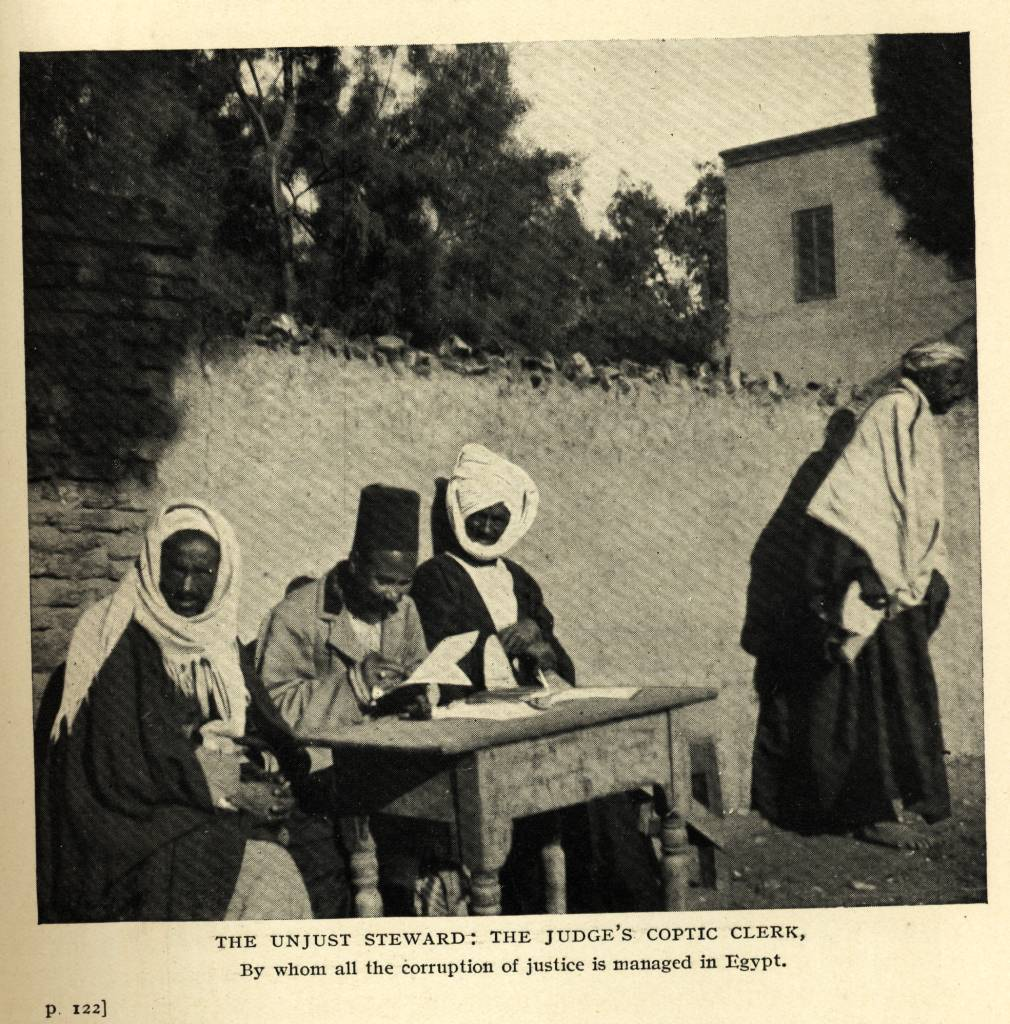
Queer Things About Egypt (1911)

Douglas Brooke Wheelton Sladen (5 February 1856, London – 12 February 1947, Hove) was an English author and academic.

== Early life and education ==
Sladen was born in London to solicitor Douglas Brooke Sladen and his wife Mary, née Wheelton. In later life he rejected his strict Evangelical upbringing. He was educated at Temple Grove School, East Sheen, Cheltenham College, and Trinity College, Oxford (B.A. 1879), and was supposed to go into the law but had a "disinclination for a settled life as a solicitor".

== Career ==
In 1879 Sladen migrated to Australia, his uncle, Sir Charles Sladen, being the 6th premier of Victoria. Although he studied law at the University of Melbourne (LL.B. 1882), intending to eventually enter politics, his uncle was reaching the end of his career and losing influence, and he had no real interest in law. In 1883, he became the first professor of history in the new University of Sydney. Because of his lecturing in the "Oxford fashion" and the tenuous status of his subject in the curriculum, he "made little impact"; in 1884 he and his wife left Australia.

Sladen considered himself first and foremost an anthologist; in 1940, he referred to himself as "an editor of anthologies" in the foreword of a book by his friend Ella Grainger. When Ella Grainger, by then married to Percy Grainger, returned to England for a visit, Sladen was "rejoiced to find that she had brought with her a collection of poems ready for publication".

== Personal life ==
In 1880, Sladen married Margaret Isabella Muirhead, daughter of a Western District squatter; they had a son. She died in 1919, and he remarried in 1930 to Dorothea Duthie. Sladen died at Hove in East Sussex in 1947.

== Selected publications ==
His work includes:

- Frithjof and Ingebjorg (1882)
- Poetry of Exiles (1883)
- In Cornwall and Across the Sea (1885)
- Edward the Black Prince (1886), an epic drama
- The Spanish Armada (1888)
- The Japs at Home (1892)
- On the Cars and Off: Being the Journal of a Pilgrimage Along the Queen's Highway to the East, from Halifax in Nova Scotia to Victoria in Vancouver's Island: With Additional Matter on Klondike (1894)
- A Japanese Marriage (1895)
- A Sicilian Marriage (1905)
- Queer Things About Sicily with Norma Lorimer (1905)
- Carthage and Tunis: The Old and New Gates of the Orient (1906)
- Egypt and the English (1908)
- Queer Things About Egypt (1911)
- The Unholy Estate (1912)
- Twenty Years of my Life (1913)
- Queer Things about Japan (1913)
- The Real "Truth about Germany" (1914)
- His German Wife (1915)
- Fair Inez: A Romance of Australia (1918)
- Paul's Wife: or "The Ostriches" (1919)
- My Long Life (1939)

As editor:

- Australian Ballads and Rhymes : Poems Inspired by Life and Scenery in Australia and New Zealand (1888)
- A Century of Australian Song (1888)
