= Robert William Rede =

Member of Victoria's volunteer militia

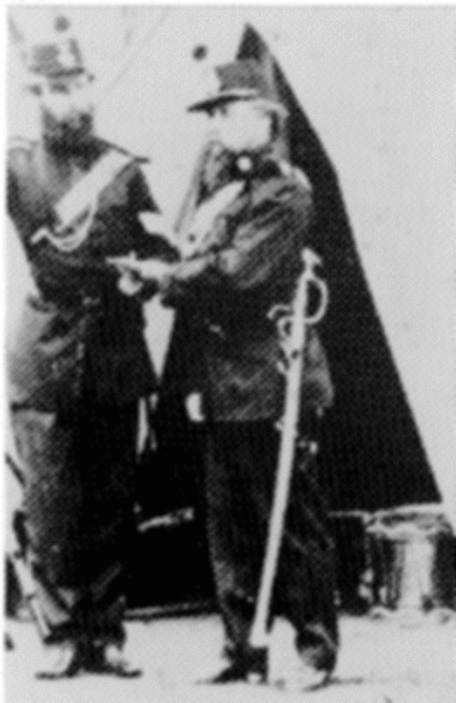
- Rede (right) in 1861 with the Geelong Volunteer Rifle Corps

Deputy Sheriff of Geelong
- In office 1855–1857

Sheriff of Ballarat
- In office 1868 - 1877

Personal details
- Born: 13 July 1815 Beccles, England
- Died: 13 July 1904 (aged 89) Melbourne, Australia
- Resting place: St Kilda Cemetery
- Spouse(s): Isabella Strachan; Geraldine Margaret
- Children: 7 including Geraldine Rede
- Occupation: Goldfield Commissioner politician sheriff militiaman

Robert William Rede (13 July 1815 – 13 July 1904) was a member of Victoria's volunteer militia, who was remembered for his part in the Eureka Rebellion.

== Career ==
Robert Rede was born at Asham's Hall, Beccles, Suffolk, a son of Ann and Thomas William Rede, a Naval officer. He spent much of his early life in France, also visiting many other European states. He arrived in Australia around 1852, at the height of the Gold Rush, and was soon digging at Forest Creek and Bendigo.

He had a fair knowledge of medicine, and became popularly known as the "little doctor". He was shortly hired by J. A. Panton, resident Commissioner at Bendigo, as his assistant. He was appointed commissioner at Mount Korong and Jones's Creek, then at Ballarat. He earned a reputation as a solid administrator and was particularly successful in resolving disputed claims.

At that time, a monthly fee of 30 shillings was required of diggers on Victorian goldfields for a Miner's Licence. Rede was in the invidious position of having to enforce this unpopular and inequitable tax, having charge of both civilian police and militia and with no guidelines as to how to deploy them except "use your discretion". This meant that regular raids were made by troops and police to apprehend those who had not paid their licence fee. By October 1864, on the orders of Sir Charles Hotham, these raids were being conducted twice weekly, and the level of discontent rose among the diggers, many of whom daily carried pistols.

After the death of digger James Scobie, and the exoneration of hotel-keeper Bentley by a bench consisting of Rede, Dewes (a magistrate for whom Rede had little affection, and suspected of corruption) and Johnstone/Johnston? (Rede's assistant), meetings were called which resulted in more unrest. Rede was rumoured to be a secret partner in Bentley's hotel.

Rede was attending a dinner in honour of the visiting American Consul, Tarlton/Tarleton?, who he praised for his generous speech, while suspecting him of ulterior motives, and had been allocated the honour of proposing the loyal toast, but he received news that a contingent of troopers being deployed to the goldfields had been set upon by diggers. He hurried to where a couple of soldiers had been wounded, but the culprits had vanished.

On 29 November the diggers, some 12,000 in number, held a meeting at Bakery Hill, condemning the treatment they had suffered at the hands of the Victorian government. Johnstone/Johnston?, led a party of police to the "Gravel Pits" diggings in a determined raid to apprehend unlicensed miners, and were met with a shower of stones and the occasional pistol shot. Rede and the few police and militia not already engaged in the affray arrived on the scene.

Rede reminded them that a commission of enquiry had been promised them to find a more equitable system, and urged restraint. He then read the Riot Act. Peter Lalor urged resistance and the miners marched to Eureka goldfield and erected the famous Eureka Stockade. On 3 December Captain John Wellesley Thomas and his men attacked the stockade, resulting in the death of 22 miners and nearly as many severely wounded. Knowing that his actions against the miners made him a likely target, Rede requested a transfer, and was given the post of deputy sheriff of Geelong. He was promoted to sheriff in July 1857.

As Major Rede, he organised the Geelong Rifles and, by the time he retired from the militia, had been promoted to lieutenant-colonel. By 1869 his area of responsibility had expanded to encompass Ballarat, Ararat and Belfast districts. He was appointed Sheriff of Melbourne around 1888 and retired in December 1889.

== Family ==
Robert Rede was married twice: first in 1859 to Isabella Strachan ( – 18 December 1862), a daughter of J. F. Strachan; then on 9 January 1873 to Margaret Geraldine Clendinning (c. 1847 – 18 August 1936) of Ballarat. He had one son, pastoralist Robert Rede, by his first marriage. He had two sons and three daughters by his second marriage.

- Robert Paisley Anderson Strachan Rede (22 January 1861 – 10 January 1944) married Rahel Bridge
- Geraldine Rede (1 December 1873 – 3 September 1943) collaborated with Violet Teague in production of the book Night Fall in the Ti-Tree (1905)
- George Clendinning Rede (c. August 1875 – 5 July 1879)
- Roger L'Estrange Murray Rede (30 August 1878 – 4 March 1930) As Commander Rede R.N. he won the DSO and the Croix de Guerre for the part he took as senior officer in command in a battle on 21 March 1918 in the English Channel off the coast of France, when his flotilla of five destroyers chased 18 of the enemy, sinking three destroyers and two torpedo boats.
- Fairlie Margaret Rede (1 July 1880 – 1968) was a horticulturist, for many years the hon. secretary of the Frankston Horticultural Society. The rose "Fairlie Rede" is named for her.
- Paston Hubert Rede (16 January 1882 – 12 May 1924) fought in the Boer War and in the Middle East during World War I. He was awarded the DCM for conspicuous bravery.

== Sources ==
- Weston Bate, 'Rede, Robert William (1815–1904)', Australian Dictionary of Biography, National Centre of Biography, Australian National University, https://adb.anu.edu.au/biography/rede-robert-william-4457/text7263, accessed 13 August 2013.
