= Blastus (disambiguation) =

The word "Blastus" may refer to:

- Blastus, the chamberlain of Herod Agrippa in the Bible
- Blastus, a Roman presbyter in the late second century
- Blastus, a genus of plants in the family Melastomataceae
- Old Blastus of Bandicoot, a 1931 novel by Miles Franklin
