= 1931 in Australian literature =

This article presents a list of the historical events and publications of Australian literature during 1931.

== Novels ==
- M. Barnard Eldershaw – Green Memory
- Miles Franklin
  - Back to Bool Bool
  - Old Blastus of Bandicoot
- Jack Lindsay – Cressida's First Lover : A Tale of Ancient Greece
- Alice Grant Rosman – The Sixth Journey
- E. V. Timms – Whitehall
- Arthur W. Upfield – The Sands of Windee

== Short stories ==
- J. H. M. Abbott – The King's School and Other Tales for Old Boys
- Vance Palmer – Separate Lives
- Henry Handel Richardson – Two Studies

== Children's and Young Adult ==
- Mary Grant Bruce – Bill of Billabong
- Frank Dalby Davison – Man-Shy
- Lilian Turner – Two Take the Road

== Poetry ==
- Mary Gilmore – The Rue Tree : Poems
- Ronald McCuaig – "Love Me and Never Leave Me"
- John Shaw Neilson – "The Bard and the Lizard"
- Elizabeth Riddell – "Lifesaver"
- Kenneth Slessor – "Five Visions of Captain Cook"

== Biography ==
- Ion Idriess – Lasseter's Last Ride : An Epic of Central Australian Gold Discovery

== Drama ==
=== Radio ===
- Fred Whaite – The Tin Soldier

=== Theatre ===
- George Landen Dann – In Beauty It Is Finished

== Awards and honours ==
=== Literary ===
| Award | Author | Title | Publisher |
|---|---|---|---|
| ALS Gold Medal | Frank Dalby Davison | Man-Shy | Angus & Robertson |

== Births ==
A list, ordered by date of birth (and, if the date is either unspecified or repeated, ordered alphabetically by surname) of births in 1931 of Australian literary figures, authors of written works or literature-related individuals follows, including year of death.

- 30 January – Shirley Hazzard, novelist (died 2016 in Manhattan, New York)
- 24 February – Barry Oakley, novelist and playwright
- 15 March – Laurie Hergenhan, literary scholar (died 2019)
- 28 March – Philip Martin, poet (died 2005)
- 16 July – Peter Mathers, novelist (born in Fulham, England)(died 2004)
- 26 October – Christobel Mattingley, writer for children and young adults (died 2019)
- 20 November – Evan Jones, poet (died 2022)

Unknown date

- Anne Spencer Parry, pioneer fantasy writer (died 1985)

== Deaths ==
A list, ordered by date of death (and, if the date is either unspecified or repeated, ordered alphabetically by surname) of deaths in 1931 of Australian literary figures, authors of written works or literature-related individuals follows, including year of birth.

- 1 August – Bertha McNamara, writer and political activist (born 1853 in Poland)
- 22 August – Edward Dyson, editor, poet and short story writer (born 1865)

== See also ==
- 1931 in Australia
- 1931 in literature
- 1931 in poetry
- List of years in Australian literature
- List of years in literature
