= 1909 in Australian literature =

This article presents a list of the historical events and publications of Australian literature during 1909.

== Books ==
- Arthur H. Adams – Galahad Jones
- Louis Becke
  - The Adventures of Louis Blake
  - 'Neath Austral Skies
- Albert Dorrington and A. G. Stephens – The Lady Calphurnia Royal
- Miles Franklin – Some Everyday Folk and Dawn
- Louise Mack — Theodora's Husband
- Ethel Turner – Fugitives from Fortune
- Lilian Turner – The Perry Girls
- Arthur Wright — A Rogue's Luck
- Rosa Praed – A Summer Wreath

== Short stories ==
- Erle Cox – "The Social Code"
- Dulcie Deamer – "Hallowe'en"
- Henry Lawson – "Roll Up at Talbragar"
- Rosa Praed – "The Bushman's Love Story"
- Steele Rudd
  - From Selection to City
  - Stocking Our Selection

== Poetry ==
- William Baylebridge – Australia to England: And Other Verses
- C. J. Dennis
  - "Doreen"
  - "The Stoush o' Day"
- George Essex Evans – "Queensland: Queen of the North: A Jubilee Ode"
- Mabel Forrest – Alpha Centauri
- Hugh McCrae – Satyrs & Sunlight: Silvarum Libri
- John Shaw Neilson
  - "Heart of Spring!"
  - "May"
  - "The Smoker Parrot"
  - "The Soldier is Home"
- Bertram Stevens – The Golden Treasury of Australian Verse (ed.)

== Drama ==
- Randolph Bedford – White Australia

== Births ==
A list, ordered by date of birth (and, if the date is either unspecified or repeated, ordered alphabetically by surname) of births in 1909 of Australian literary figures, authors of written works or literature-related individuals follows, including year of death.

- 28 January – Beatrice Davis, editor and critic (died 1992)
- 20 June – Errol Flynn, actor and writer (died 1959)
- 26 June – Mavis Thorpe Clark, writer for children (died 1999)
- 11 December – Ronald McKie, novelist (died 1991)

Unknown date

- Joyce Dingwell, novelist (died 1997)

== Deaths ==
A list, ordered by date of death (and, if the date is either unspecified or repeated, ordered alphabetically by surname) of deaths in 1909 of Australian literary figures, authors of written works or literature-related individuals follows, including year of birth.

- 10 November – George Essex Evans, poet (born 1863)
- 28 November – W. T. Goodge, poet (born 1862)

Unknown date

- Emily Mary Barton, poet (born 1817, England)

== See also ==
- 1909 in Australia
- 1909 in literature
- 1909 in poetry
- List of years in Australian literature
- List of years in literature
