= 1863 in Australian literature =

This article presents a list of the historical events and publications of Australian literature during 1863.

== Books ==
- Maud Jeanne Franc – Vermont Vale : or Home Pictures in Australia
- Henry Kingsley – The Hillyars and the Burtons : A Story of Two Families

== Short stories ==
- J. R. Houlding
  - "Jack Tars, Ahoy!"
  - "Stone Blind"

== Poetry ==
- William à Beckett – The Earl's Choice and Other Poems
- Emma Frances Anderson – "An Australian Girl's Farewell"
- Henry Kendall
  - "By the Sea"
  - "Mountain Moss"
  - "Rest"
  - "To My Brother, Basil E. Kendall"

== Births ==
A list, ordered by date of birth (and, if the date is either unspecified or repeated, ordered alphabetically by surname) of births in 1863 of Australian literary figures, authors of written works or literature-related individuals follows, including year of death.

- 26 February — John Sandes, poet, journalist and author (died 1938)
- 18 June – George Essex Evans, poet and writer (died 1909)

== See also ==
- 1863 in Australia
- 1863 in literature
- 1863 in poetry
- List of years in Australian literature
- List of years in literature
