= Some Everyday Folk and Dawn =

1909 novel by Miles Franklin

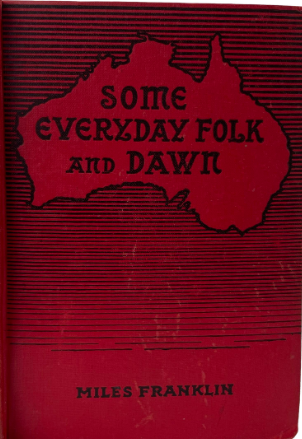
- Author: Miles Franklin
- Language: English
- Genre: Fiction
- Publisher: William Blackwood & Sons
- Publication date: 1909
- Publication place: Australia
- Media type: Print
- Pages: 347pp
- Preceded by: My Brilliant Career
- Followed by: Up the Country

Some Everyday Folk and Dawn (1909) is a novel by Australian writer Miles Franklin.

== Story outline ==
The novel is set in the small town of Noonoon at a time when Australian women have just been granted the right to vote. At an election two male candidates face off: one styling himself the "women's" candidate and the other the "men's". Grandma Clay runs a boarding house in the town and living with her are her granddaughter Dawn and grandson Andrew. Against the backdrop of the election campaign the story follows the development of a love affair between Dawn and a local athlete, Ernest Breslow.

== Critical reception ==
A reviewer in The Sydney Morning Herald found some good and some not so good elements in the book: "Australia is shown in all its up-country attractiveness-and unattractiveness; but we who know the subtle charm know also how to forgive the ofttimes crudity of colour and form. Those who prefer to do so may classify the book as fiction, but for us it has too much acute realism to pass as mere make-believe. It is, of course, a story of sorts, but beyond that it is a true picture of Australia, and as such we prefer to label it as fact."

On the other hand a reviewer in The Queenslander was not impressed with the book at all: "The young author of "My Brilliant Career" has written a big story with much that is good in it and much that is worthless. It is one of the "Australian books for English readers" sort of thing, and will cause a good deal of resentment on the part of many Australians."

== See also ==
- 1909 in Australian literature
