= Miles Franklin Primary School =

School in Canberra, Australia

Coordinates: 35.21305°S 149.06679°E

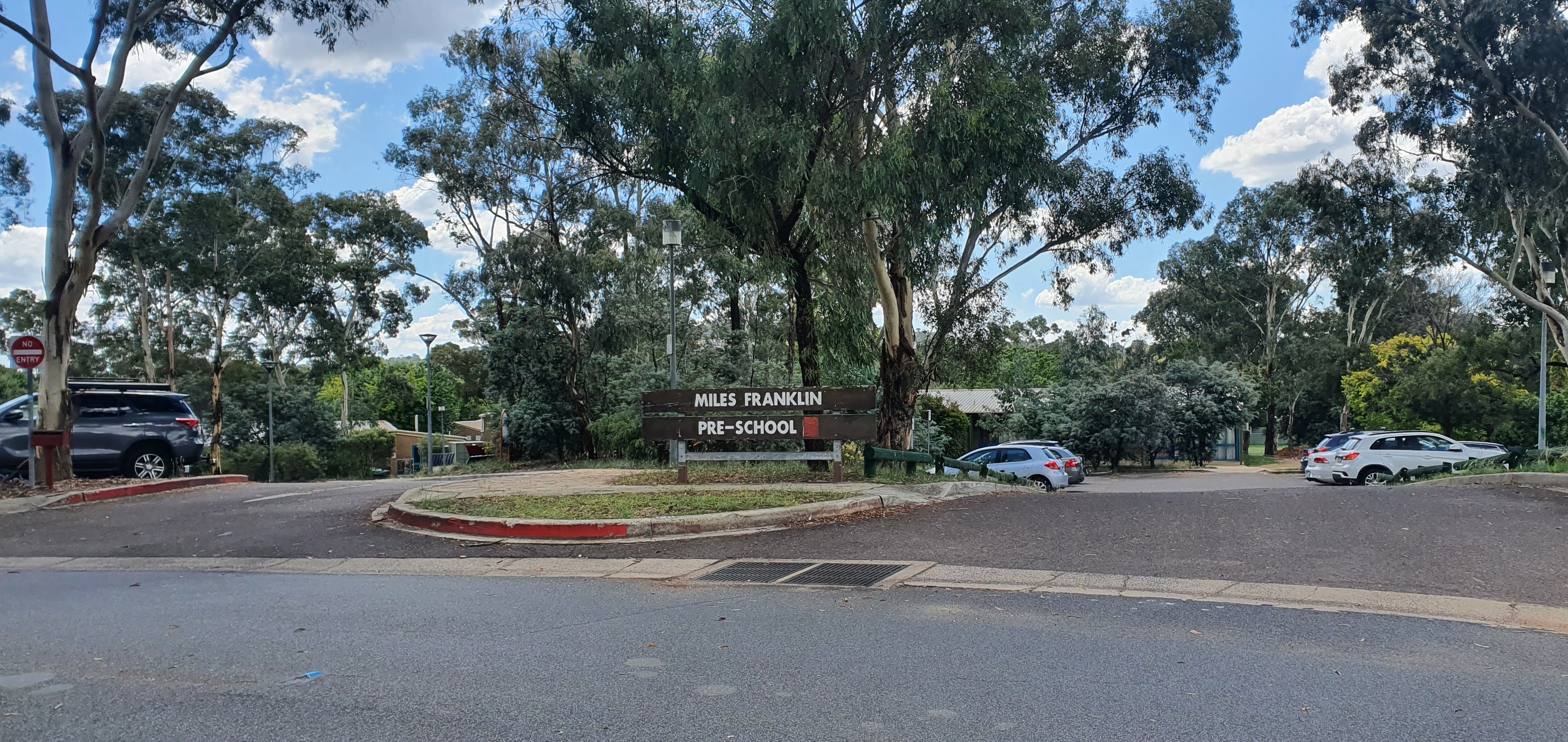

Information
- Established: 1980; 45 years ago

Miles Franklin Primary School is a primary school in Evatt, Canberra. The school is named after Australian author Miles Franklin and was opened in 1980; as Franklin's novel My Brilliant Career had received public acclaim in 1979, it seemed suitable for the school to be named in recognition of her. Each year the school celebrates her birthday with a writing competition and an 'old fashion' dress up day. During this day the students are involved in a variety of activities from yesteryear.

The school's colours are red, blue and white.

They have three houses, all named after Australian authors:

- Jennings (red)
- Klein (white)
- Gibbs (blue)

The houses compete in swimming carnivals, athletics carnivals, and to a lesser extent, cross country races.

== Notable employees ==
- Stuart Rendell, a former teacher and a Gold Medalist for hammer throwing at the 2006 Commonwealth Games in Melbourne
- Kerrie Taurima, an After School Care worker, a Silver Medalist at the Commonwealth Games for long jump at the 2006 Commonwealth Games
