= All That Swagger =

1936 novel by Miles Franklin

All that Swagger
- Author: Miles Franklin
- Language: English
- Genre: Fiction
- Publisher: Bulletin, Sydney
- Publication date: 1936
- Publication place: Australia
- Media type: Print
- Pages: 500pp
- Preceded by: Bring the Monkey
- Followed by: Pioneers on Parade

All that Swagger (1936) is a family saga novel by Australian writer Miles Franklin.

== Story outline ==
The novel follows the fortunes of a pioneering family, the Delacys, in the Murrumbidgee River area across 100 years and four generations.

== Critical reception ==
In The Telegraph (Brisbane) a reviewer noted: "The story is enriched with a mass of incident, much of it amusing, and much of it pregnant with drama. It would have gained in style and in coherence if the blue pencil had been applied here and there, but there is enough that is wholly admirable to justify its inclusion among the Australian novels that matter."

The Sydney Morning Herald was very impressed with the book: "She is to be congratulated upon both the breadth and height of her achievement, she has produced a work of integrity, peopled with characters which are not giants or satyrs, but endearing humans, lit with the never-guttering flame of passionate idealism and an exultant devotion to the soil and soul of Australia."

== See also ==
- 1936 in Australian literature

== Notes ==
The novel was originally serialised in the pages of The Bulletin magazine between 23 September and 4 November 1936.

The Oxford Companion to Australian Literature notes that the novel's protagonist, "Irish immigrant Danny Delacy, is modelled upon Miles Franklin's paternal grandfather, Joseph Franklin, and the exploits and adventures of four generations of Delacys on the land around the headwaters of the Murrumbidgee River follow roughly the fortunes of the Franklin family from 1833 to 1933."
