= Jungfrau (novel) =

Book by Dymphna Cusack

- Book cover for Jungfrau (1989 Penguin Books Australia edition)
- Author: Dymphna Cusack
- Language: English
- Genre: Fiction
- Publisher: Bulletin, Australia
- Publication date: 1936
- Publication place: Australia
- Media type: Print
- Pages: 292pp
- Preceded by: –
- Followed by: Pioneers on Parade

Jungfrau (1936) is the debut novel by Australian writer Dymphna Cusack.

== Story outline ==
The novel tells the story of a 1930s Sydney school teacher, Thea, her affair with a married university professor, and the impact that affair has on all the people involved.

== Critical reception ==
A reviewer in The Telegraph (Brisbane) noted that the author was a "writer of promise" and went on: "It is written with the frankness characteristic of so many writers of to-day who, like modern youth In revolt, demand that their parents (and their contemporaries, too) should face facts and not play the ostrich while life goes on round them in aspects which they disapprove, ignore and almost persuade themselves are non-existent."

Leslie Haylen in The Australian Women's Weekly praised the author for writing about modern women in the city and noted: "JUNGFRAU" is a noteworthy addition to the growing list of Australian novels, because it does deal with these things, and because, as well, it has craftsmanship and a fine understanding of the problems and reactions of the young woman of 1936."

== See also ==
- 1936 in Australian literature
