= On Dearborn Street =

1981 novel by Miles Franklin

- Author: Miles Franklin
- Language: English
- Genre: Fiction
- Publisher: University of Queensland Press
- Publication date: January 1, 1981

On Dearborn Street is a novel by Australian author Miles Franklin, unpublished in her lifetime and first published in 1981.

== Synopsis ==
The book follows the life of Sybyl Penelo, an editor and businesswoman from Chicago who is determined to avoid marriage. After her wealthy love interest, Bobby Hoyne dies in a car race, she grows close to the older business man Mr. Cavarley and they become engaged.

== Reception and themes ==
Two critics noted Sybyl's resemblance to Franklin. It was noted for its feminist themes but the use of American English vernacular and the overarching plot was criticized. It has been described as a "New Woman" novel by Professor Janet Lee.
