= Cockatoos (novel) =

Book by Miles Franklin

- First edition
- Author: Miles Franklin
- Language: English
- Genre: Fiction
- Publisher: Angus and Robertson
- Publication date: 1954
- Publication place: Australia
- Media type: Print
- Pages: 274pp
- Preceded by: Prelude to Waking
- Followed by: Gentleman at Gyang Gyang

Cockatoos : A Story of Youth and Exodists (1954) is a novel by Australian writer Miles Franklin. It was originally published under the author's pseudonym "Brent of Bin Bin".

== Story outline ==
This novel in the "Brent of Bin Bin" series follows the story of 16-year-old Ignez Milford who wants to leave her farming community to pursue a singing career.

== Critical reception ==
A reviewer in The West Australian noted the need for some knowledge of the series to date: "'It would be difficult fairly to review the fourth Brent of Bin Bin novel out of context with its forerunners and the long sustained legend of their authorship. The uninitiated might well find himself bewildered by so vast a company of characters, intermarried or otherwise associated through two or three generations and into which he is plunged, a stranger, in the opening chapters of Cockatoos...However, to those already schooled in the tradition of Brent of Bin Bin, Cockatoos will be hailed as a welcome addition to the "up country" stories of the Goulburn district of 50 years and more ago. It has the gaiety, the sensitive love of country and the vivid re-creation of period to be found in its preceding works."

"G. H.", a reviewer in The Argus, was impressed with the writing: "This novel reminds us of the exodists who left Australia half a century ago because they found it a disappointing country. We cannot regard our history as a continuous, process without carrying in our. minds these periods of retrogression which are so difficult to understand today. This novel is not a romantic story, but a slice of the Australian story and It will probably last longer than most contemporary history."

== See also ==
- 1954 in Australian literature
