= Ina Gregory =

Australian artist (1874–1964)

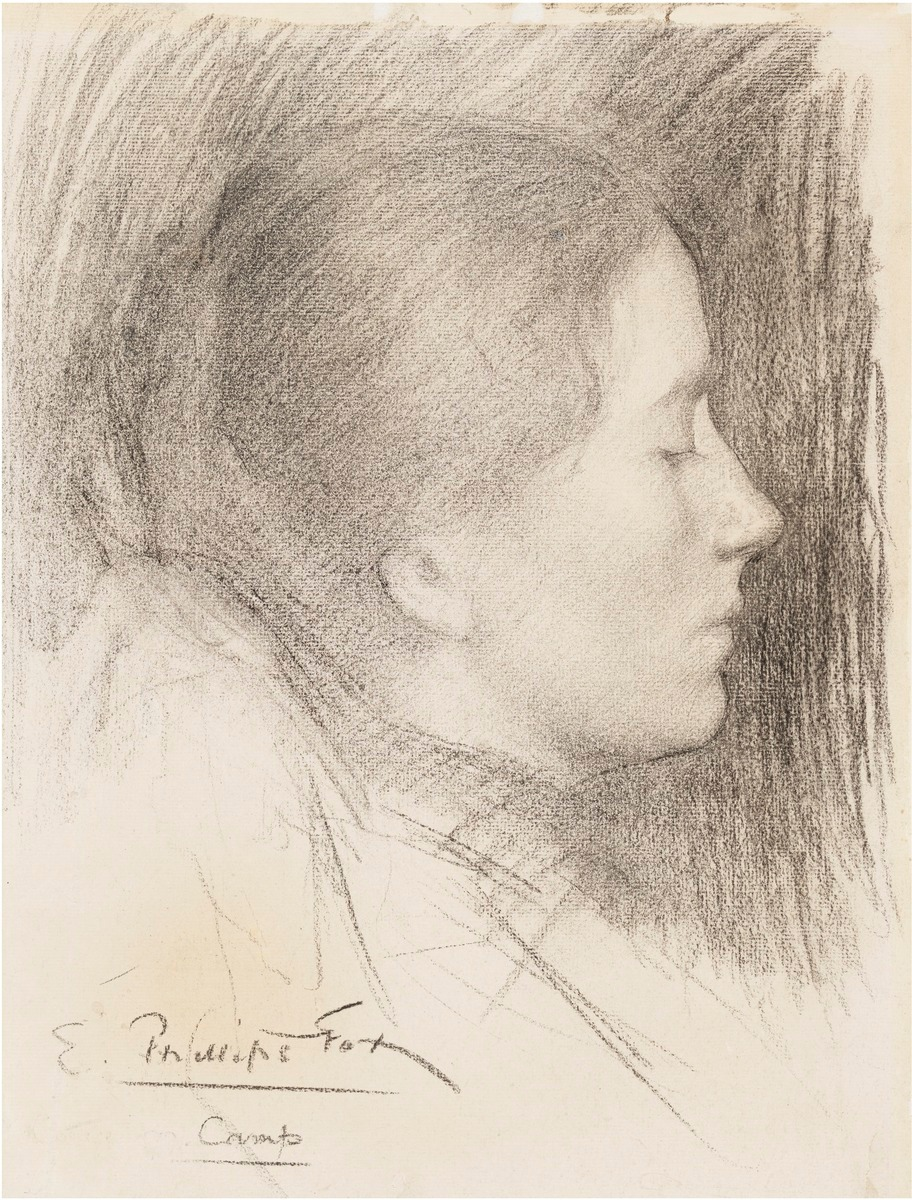
- Ina Gregory by E. Phillips Fox
- Born: Georgina Alice Gregory; 18 October 1874; East Melbourne, Victoria, Australia
- Died: 5 June 1964 (aged 89)
- Education: National Gallery School
- Known for: Painting, Portraiture
- Movement: Impressionism

Georgina Alice Gregory (18 October 1874 – 5 June 1964) was an Australian artist.

Gregory was born on 18 October 1874 in East Melbourne to Alice (née Topp) and John Burslem Gregory, barrister-at-law. She was the second of seven children. Her family was friendly with the Teague family, whose daughter Violet Teague also became a notable artist at the Heidelberg School of Art.

She studied at the National Gallery School for five years in the 1880s, and under E. Phillips Fox and Tudor St. George Tucker at the Melbourne School of Art (MSA) and at Charterisville, an old mansion above the Yarra River in East Ivanhoe, the lease of which Fox and Tucker had taken over from Walter Withers in 1893. It was Australia's first recognised summer school of art. The women, including Mary Meyer, Bertha Merfield, Henrietta Irving, Ursula Foster and Helen Peters were accommodated in rooms of the stone house and a chaperon and housekeeper looked after them. Violet Teague may have been their tutor.

At the MSA's annual exhibition in 1898 she was awarded first prize for a landscape painting, described in Table Talk as "venturesome choice of a group of bare trees breaking the foreground of her picture provided difficulty enough for the oldest artist". Gregory subsequently became a member of the Victorian Artists' Society and regularly exhibited with them from 1898 to 1912.

One of Gregory's best known works is Four Art Students, Charterisville, an oil painting she completed while a student there. The painting shows four students working at the Charterisville estate of E. Phillips Fox, and has been exhibited and illustrated more than any other artwork by an Australian woman impressionist.

Ina and her sister Ada lived in relative seclusion at the back of Rosedale, their family's home in St Kilda. By 1908 according to some accounts she was practically nocturnal, believing in "a life intellectual and emotional, lifted far above the materiality of an average existence."

In 1916 Gregory was one of the Melbourne artists who volunteered to paint the portraits of children to raise funds for the French Red Cross. A solo exhibition of 176 her artworks at the Melbourne Athenaeum was opened by Sir Robert Garran in April 1925 and received mixed reviews. A joint exhibition with Jane Price in June 1942 was favourably reviewed, Harold Herbert reporting in the Argus that "Ina Gregory has caught the colour and has seen the decorative possibilities of autumn foliage ... and many of her panels of orchard blossoms are splendid".

== Legacy ==
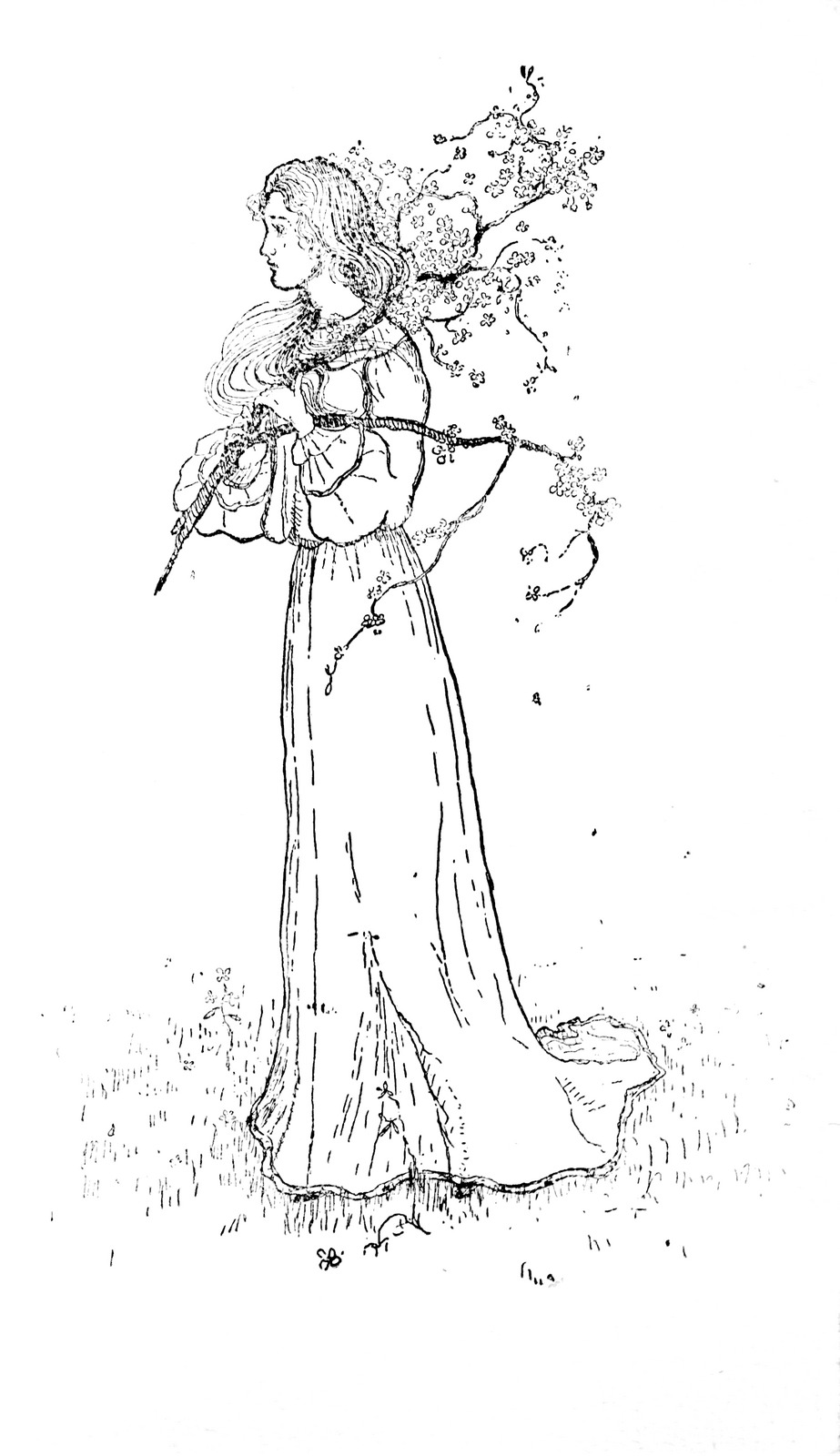
A page from Flowers of thought culled from nature's garden [1918] illustrated by Ina Gregory, State Library Victoria

Her work has been collected by the National Gallery of Australia and National Gallery of Victoria.

Ina Gregory Circuit in the Canberra suburb of Conder is named in her honour.
