= Prelude to Waking =

Book by Miles Franklin

- First edition
- Author: Miles Franklin
- Language: English
- Genre: Fiction
- Publisher: Angus and Robertson
- Publication date: 1950
- Publication place: Australia
- Media type: Print
- Pages: 245pp
- Preceded by: My Career Goes Bung
- Followed by: Cockatoos

Prelude to Waking : A Novel in the First Person and Parentheses (1950) is a novel by Australian writer Miles Franklin, which was originally published under the author's pseudonym "Brent of Bin Bin".

== Story outline ==
The novel is set in England, France and the USA, in the period immediately following World War I. The story is told by Nigel Barraclough about Merlin Giltinane and her father and brother from Australia.

== Critical reception ==
A reviewer in The Sydney Morning Herald noted that the author had written some fine novels using this pseudonym but: "Prelude to Waking, which carries a note by the author, dated 1925, will only detract from that reputation. It is a shallow tale of unreal people, built shakily and ornately on a slight situation, and told in an irritatingly affected style."

Similarly Gladys Hain in The Argus was also disappointed: "Having enjoyed earlier books by Brent of Bin Bin who still remains anonymous, the reader will approach "Prelude To Waking" with great expectations. But he-and she-will be disappointed, for the style has become too affectedly nonchalant, and the ideas are too few to hold the narrative together. At times the old wit bubbles up, but there is post-war weariness in many of the witticisms, and though the character delineation is admirable the whole book has a sketchiness which prevents the reader settling down to it. A pity."

== See also ==
- 1950 in Australian literature
