= Geelong Volunteer Rifle Corps =

Australian Volunteer Force (1854 to 1912)

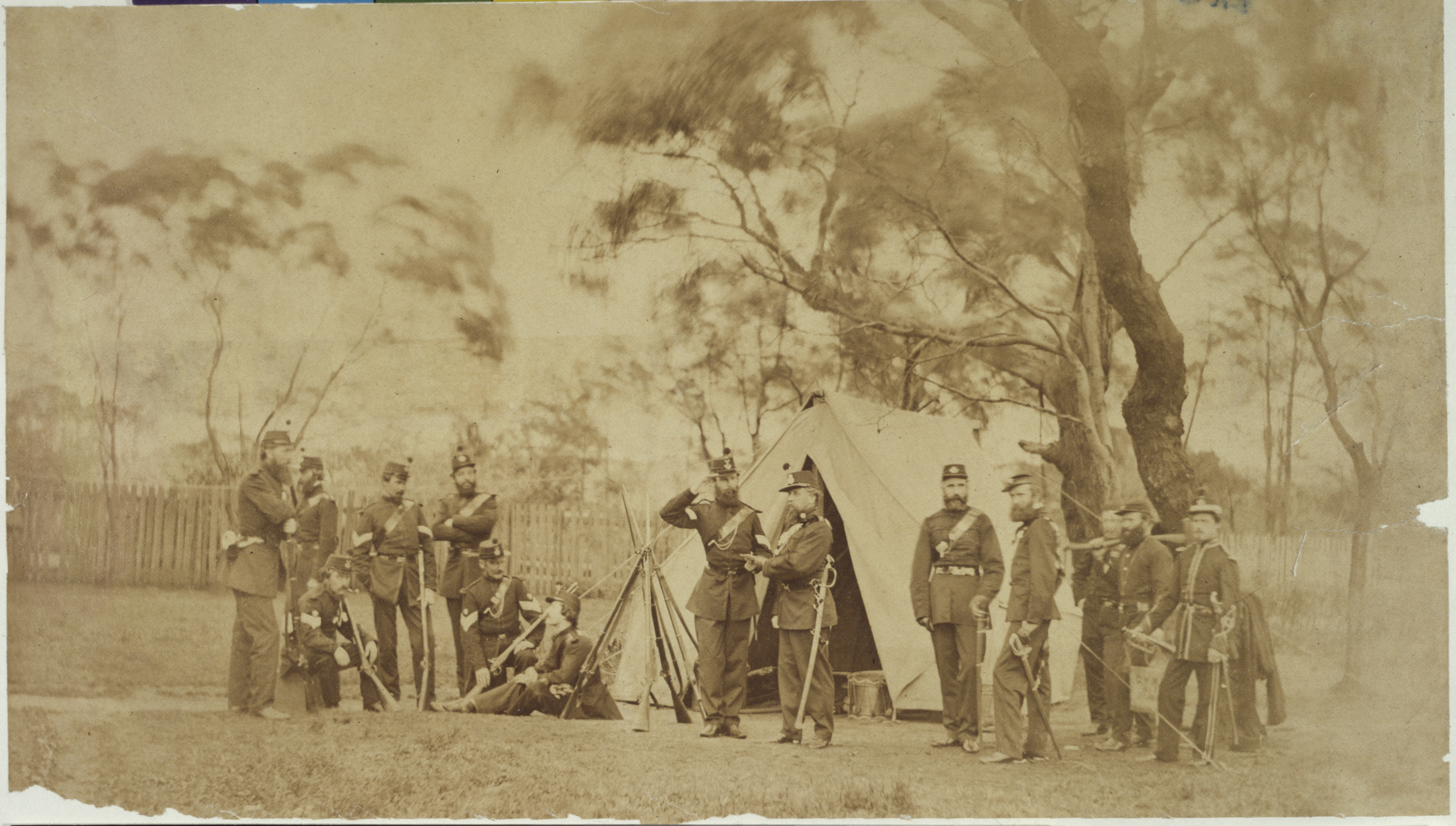
- Officers and non-commissioned officers of the Geelong Rifles in 1861. Robert William Rede (with sword) can be seen in the middle
- Active: 1854–1912
- Country: Colony of Victoria
- Allegiance: British Empire; Colony of Victoria
- Type: Volunteer Force
- Role: Peacekeeping; Civil Defense
- Size: Varied, peaked at 1,100
- Garrison/HQ: Geelong
- Engagements: Eureka Rebellion: Battle of the Eureka Stockade

Commanders
- Notable commanders: Robert William Rede

The Geelong Volunteer Rifle Corps, also called the Geelong Rifle Corps, or the Geelong Rifles, was a part-time Volunteer Force of the Colony of Victoria (later the state of Victoria) in Australia from 1854 to 1912. The unit is named after the city of Geelong and was involved in suppressing the Eureka Rebellion at the Battle of the Eureka Stockade. The unit was originally commanded and organized by Robert William Rede.

== History ==
=== Founding ===
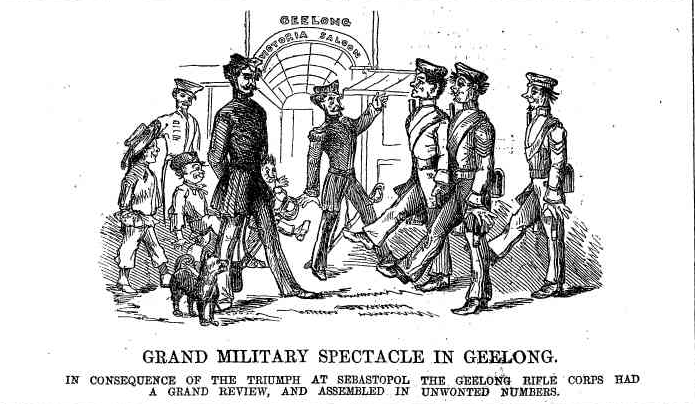
A political cartoon of the Geelong Volunteer Rifle Corps on parade from 1855

Prior to the Federation of Australia in 1901 each of the six Australian colonies was responsible for its own defense. In 1854 there were only 40 professional soldiers garrisoned in Geelong which prompted volunteer citizens to form a Volunteer Force. Volunteer forces were organized in each of the six Australian colonies, most were unpaid volunteers while others were only part-time. The Geelong Volunteer Rifle Corps was founded in December 1854 during the Crimean War with the passing of the Victoria Volunteer Act by Governor Sir Charles Hotham. The primary role of the Volunteer Corps in Victoria and other colonies was to protect the colony from Russian naval attacks, enforce civil laws, and quell riots.

The Victoria Volunteer Act stipulated that all Volunteer Corps within the six Australian colonies were subject to the rules and regulations of the regular British Army and that they were to be inspected every six months. The Volunteer Corps were under the direct command of the Lieutenant-Governor of Victoria and could be dispensed for a variety of reasons alongside regular British and other colonial forces. The Geelong Volunteer Rifle Corps was primarily recruited by Robert William Rede who eventually served as the unit's Major. Rede was later the Ballarat Goldfield Commissioner in 1854 during the Eureka Rebellion. Other officers of the unit at its original muster include Captain Louis Kitz and Lieutenant Colonel Fenwick.

=== Role in the Eureka rebellion ===
The Geelong Rifles actively took part in the broader Battle of the Eureka Stockade which occurred on 3 December 1854 at Bakery Hill in Ballarat East (now Eureka). Captain Kee of the Geelong Rifles offered the unit's services for the protection of the town in order to restore the rule of law. According to Australian author Geoff Hocking, the Geelong Rifles, along with other Volunteer Forces, the 12th Regiment of Foot (Suffolk Regiment), and the 40th (the 2nd Somersetshire) Regiment of Foot were all called to Bakery Hill in order to suppress the stockade rebels. The Geelong Rifles, at the time still commanded by Rede, were part of the broader "government camp" bivouacked near the Eureka stockade which was later utilized to subdue the stockade rebels.

=== Uniform and equipment ===
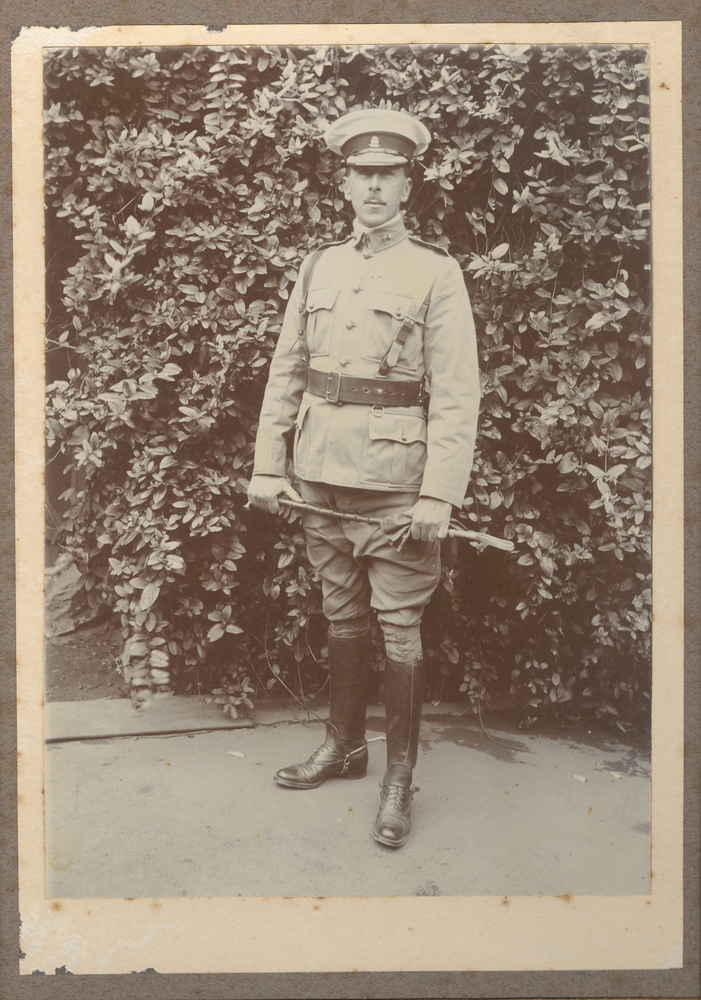
A member of the Geelong Volunteer Rifle Corps in 1910. Courtesy of the Federation University Australia Historical Collection.

The newspaper the Geelong Advertiser and Intelligencer from Saturday 30 December 1854 states "the uniform of the new body that is to be formed will come out of England, but will be supplied at the expense of the members". According to one source, From Boudry to the Barrabool Hills by Charles Louis Tétaz, the Geelong Rifle Corps wore green uniforms, as was common with rifle regiments at the time, with a silver trim and were equipped with sword bayonets. According Tétaz, who was a Swiss immigrant to Melbourne, "This isn't a cavalry unit as you think, but something like your carabineers; I have a full uniform which is green and looks pretty good on me". Unlike other Volunteer Forces, members of the Geelong Volunteer Rifle Corps had to pay a membership fee in order to drill with the unit, this fee varied but could cost upwards of £20 - £25 a year. The Geelong Rifles met intermittently every six months to be inspected, drill, and conduct rifle practice. By 1854 although the Pattern 1853 Enfield began to see service in the regular British Army, some volunteer forces throughout the empire were still relegated to utilizing the transitional Pattern 1851 Minié rifle or the older Brown Bess smoothbore flintlock musket. Later in the 1870's and 1880's members of the Victoria volunteer forces were armed with the Snider–Enfield, the Martini–Henry, and the Lancaster rifle.

=== Later history ===
Following the Crimean War the popularity of the volunteer movement in Australia greatly dwindled. The Geelong Rifles were officially retired as a Volunteer Force by 1912 and were eventually absorbed into the Royal Victorian Volunteer Artillery Regiment. The modern-day shooting range and rifle club, the Geelong Rifle Club, located in Anakie, Victoria also traces its origins to the Geelong Volunteer Rifle Corps and the shooting matches they would participate in against other volunteer forces in Victoria.
