= Geraldine Rede =

Australian artist (1874–1943)

Geraldine Rede (1874 – 4 September 1943) was an Australian artist and political campaigner.

== Early life and family ==
Geraldine Rede was born in 1874 to Robert Rede, Gold Commissioner during the Eureka Rebellion and later Sheriff in Ballarat and Geelong, and Margaret Clendinning. Rede and her five siblings were the product of her father's relentless pursuit of her mother, who married on 9 January 1873 at St Paul’s Church of England in Ballarat. Rede's brother, Lieutenant Paston Hubert Rede, enlisted in the Boer War in 1902 and served in the 4th Battalion Australian Commonwealth Horse (VIC) and the 4th Lighthorse Brigade, where he was promoted to Lieutenant.

== Career ==
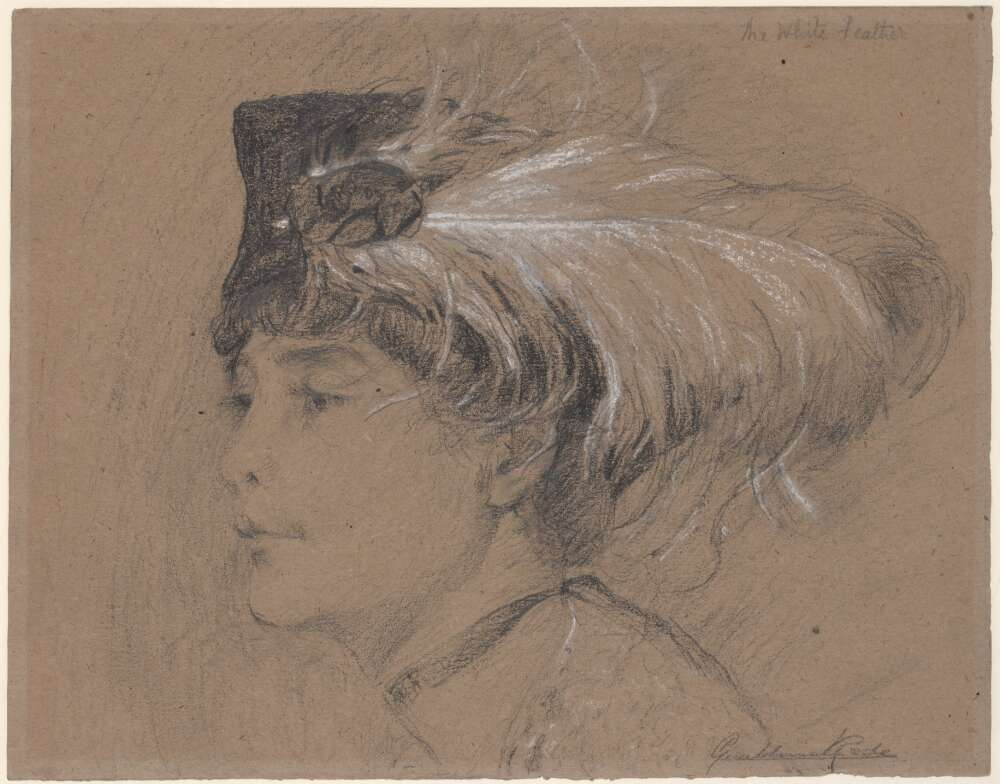
A sketch by Geraldine Rede of a young Miles Franklin (The white feather, National Library of Australia)

An illustrator and a printmaker, Rede was known as a frequent collaborator of Violet Teague. The friends lived part of their lives in Mt. Eliza, drawing inspiration from the creatures there for their illustrations. Rede and Teague were learned in the Japanese style of woodblock printing, together designing and publishing the book Night Fall in the Ti-Tree from Teague's Collins Street studio in 1905. Rede's second handmade book Little Book of Australian Trees was exhibited in the A.N.A. Exhibition of women's work in 1909.

Rede sketched a portrait around 1900 of a young Miles Franklin called The White Feather that is held in the National Library of Australia's collection.

In 1911 Rede became honorary secretary of the Women's Political Association, a non-party organisation founded by Vida Goldstein in 1903, which published the monthly paper, Woman Voter. Rede and Goldstein's sister Aileen visited London in 1914 to attend the Conference of the Overseas Union. The Imperial Colonial Club and Overseas Union was established in 1907 for influential English-speaking people from Great Britain and the colonies overseas to gather and socialise, and share entertainment.
