= The Boy with the Palette =

Painting by Violet Teagues

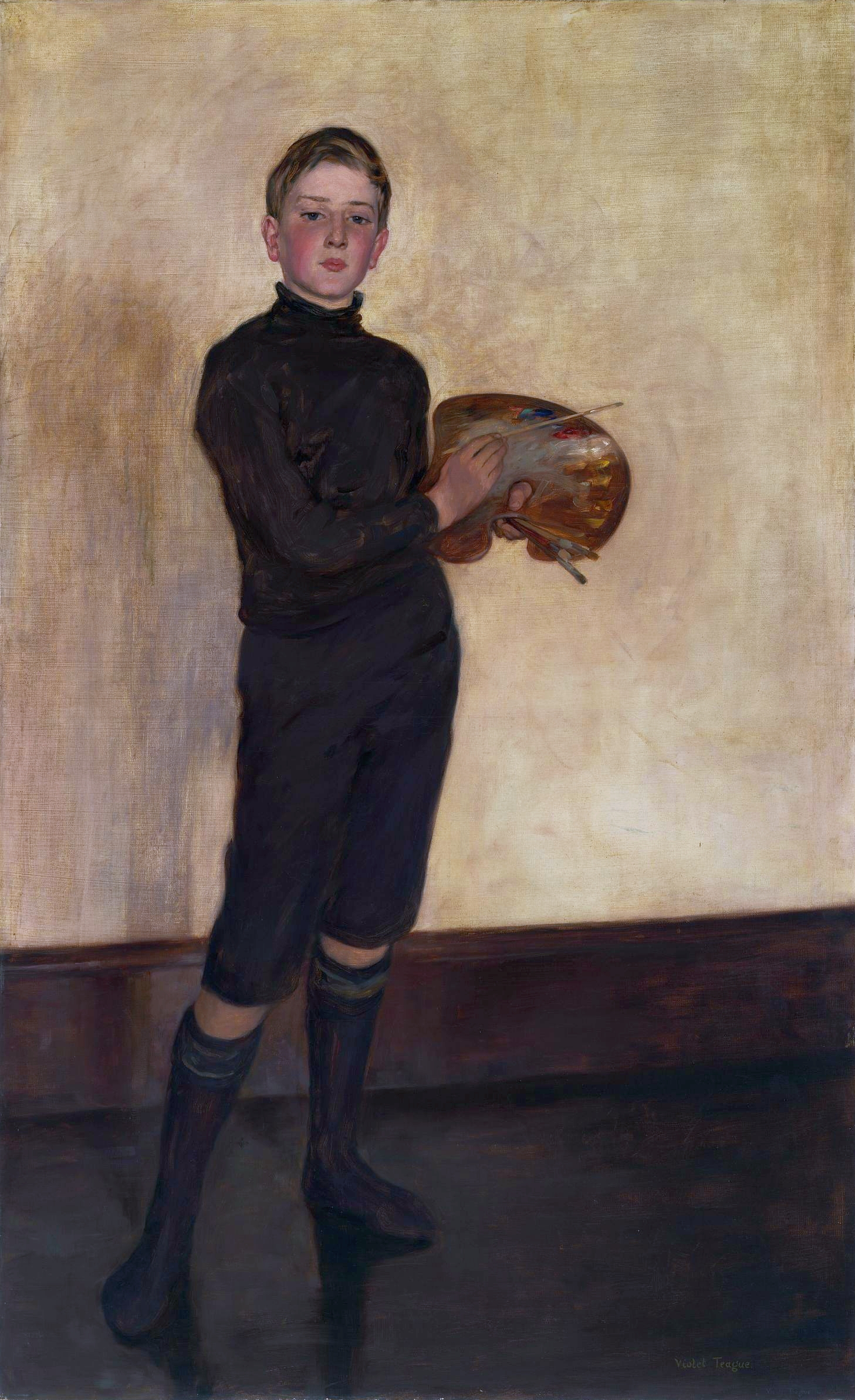
- Artist: Violet Teague
- Year: 1911
- Medium: oil on canvas
- Dimensions: 175.5 cm × 108.5 cm (69.1 in × 42.7 in)
- Location: National Gallery of Australia, Canberra
- Website: nga.gov.au

The Boy with the Palette is a 1911 oil on canvas painting by Australian artist Violet Teague. The painting depicts a boy, wearing a roll-neck sweater and knickerbockers, holding a palette.

== Exhibition ==
The work was exhibited in the Victorian Artists Society in Melbourne in 1911 where a correspondent for The Age described it as "one of the most strikingly effective things in the exhibition."

The fine swing of the boy's slight, black-clothed form, its quality of tone against the white background, as also the treatment of the head, do much to compensate for a weakness in the proportions, and a falling off in the painting of the lower part of the picture

— The Age,

After a further exhibition in Sydney, Teague sent the painting to Paris to be exhibited at the Old Salon in Paris in 1914, where it arrived too late to be admitted. The work was stored in Paris for the duration of World War I, finally exhibited in 1920. Teague's friend and fellow artist Rupert Bunny wrote to Teague from Paris, noting the work as "one of the best things there, and I am quite excited by it". The work was awarded a silver medal, erroneously made out to "Monsieur Teague", which the artist had corrected. Writing about the Old Salon exhibition, art historian Joan Kerr queried whether the judges erred because they preferred to "acknowledge excellence in a male rather than a female artist". The following year it was exhibited at the Royal Academy of Arts in London.

== Reaction ==
The work reveals inspiration from Édouard Manet's The Fifer (1866), a painting of a young musician.

The gentle sway of his body animates the whole composition in a way few painters can achieve today; it ultimately recalls the pose characteristic of International Gothic sculptures

— Christopher Allen,

== Subject ==
The subject was Theo Scharf, a 12 year old artist and musician, who Teague was instructing in print making.

== Provenance ==
The painting remained with Teague and her famility until 1976 when it was gifted to the National Gallery of Australia. It remains in its collection.
