= Bring the Monkey =

Book by Miles Franklin

- Author: Miles Franklin
- Language: English
- Genre: Fiction
- Publisher: Endeavour Press, Sydney
- Publication date: 1933
- Publication place: Australia
- Media type: Print
- Pages: 245pp
- Preceded by: Old Blastus of Bandicoot
- Followed by: All That Swagger

Bring the Monkey : A Light Novel (1933) is a crime/mystery novel by Australian writer Miles Franklin.

== Story outline ==
This is a mystery novel involving a murder and the theft of jewels from an English country mansion, Tattingwood Hall.

== Critical reception ==
In The West Australian a reviewer noted: "It is something more than a mystery story, however, and might be as aptly described as a highly amusing and clever satire on certain aspects of modern English and American social life, in which a wealthy film artist with an avid love of publicity and an amateur aviator's craze of flying stunts are satirised with rare subtlety. The part which a monkey plays in the story gives it a bizarre flavour and heightens the entertainment of the author's spicy narrative."

While acknowledging the standard setup of the mystery in the novel a reviewer in The News (Adelaide) found that " in her handling of her story, Miss Franklin strikes a note which should arrest the interest of even the most knowledgeable of mystery and story tastes. There is a sophistication and sprightly satirical humor in her style which is as diverting as it is novel in a book of this type."

== See also ==
- 1933 in Australian literature
