= Back to Bool Bool =

Book by Miles Franklin

- Author: Miles Franklin
- Language: English
- Genre: Fiction
- Publisher: William Blackwood & Sons
- Publication date: 1931
- Publication place: Australia
- Media type: Print
- Pages: 408pp
- Preceded by: Ten Creeks Run
- Followed by: Old Blastus of Bandicoot

Back to Bool Bool (1931) is a novel by Australian writer Miles Franklin. It was originally published under the author's pseudonym "Brent of Bin Bin".

== Story outline ==
While not a sequel to the earlier "Brent of Bin Bin" novels, this book's setting is again in the Monaro/Murrumbidgee area of New South Wales, though the time period is now the late 1920s.

Several members of the Poole-Mazere-Healey-Breenan clan are returning to Australia, and their home town of Book Book, by sea. The novel follows the various characters as they return to life in Australia and provides a commentary on the differences between Australian and European life.

== Critical reception ==
In a major review of the novel in The Telegraph (Brisbane) literary critic Nettie Palmer states up-front: "In Brent of Bin Bin's first books, Up the Country and Ten Creeks Run, the pioneers were struggling with nature in its virgin state. In the new book, Back to Bool Bool, mankind in Australia is struggling with a man-made state of affairs. Not the original bush is now to be tamed, but the weeds of degeneration. The book is therefore less an idyllic picture of the Monaro and the little old town of Bool Bool than an exposure of the "fat hen and nettles" that are choking Australia's development."

A reviewer in The West Australasian gave a warning as well as praise: "Readers who want action are warned off this book, but those seeking mental stimulation will find an extraordinarily true commentary on present conditions here. Not the least amazing thing is the willingness of an English publisher to finance a book that is devoted entirely to the Australian outlook. It is an encouraging sign of the times."

== See also ==
- 1931 in Australian literature
