= Ten Creeks Run =

Book by Miles Franklin

- Author: Miles Franklin
- Language: English
- Genre: Fiction
- Publisher: William Blackwood & Sons
- Publication date: 1930
- Publication place: Australia
- Media type: Print
- Pages: 365pp
- Preceded by: Up the Country
- Followed by: Back to Bool Bool

Ten Creeks Run : A Tale of the Horse and Cattle Stations of the Murrumbidgee (1930) is a novel by Australian writer Miles Franklin.

Originally published as by "Brent of Bin Bin", this novel forms the second part of a trilogy, preceded by Up the Country (1928) and followed by Cockatoos (1955).

== Story outline ==
While not being a direct sequel to Up the Country this novel also concerns the Murrumbidgee country and the second and third generations of the Mazeres, the Pooles, the Stantons, the Healeys, and the Milfords, who also featured in the first novel.

== Critical reception ==
While admitting that the novel is not up to the standard of its predecessor a reviewer in The Sydney Mail found "as a tale, its characters (and there are a host of them) are drawn with a skill and clarity that prove the author to be not only a keen observer, but a true artist."

A reviewer in The Australasian indicated that the book has some good points: "There may be some who will find his story a little tedious, but they will be those to whom the history of the pioneering days of their country matters little. From a literary point of view the quality of the book is uneven, indeed astonishingly uneven. But in deep human interest it lacks nothing." (Note: at the time this review was written reviewers were still unsure about the identity of the novel's author - hence the gender confusion.)

== See also ==
- 1930 in Australian literature
