= My Career Goes Bung =

Novel by Miles Franklin

- First edition
- Author: Miles Franklin
- Language: English
- Genre: Fiction
- Publisher: Georgian House, Australia
- Publication date: August 1946
- Publication place: Australia
- Media type: Print
- Pages: 234pp
- Preceded by: Pioneers on Parade
- Followed by: Prelude to Waking

My Career Goes Bung: Purporting to be the Autobiography of Sybylla Penelope Melvyn is a satirical novel by Australian author Stella "Miles" Franklin, and the sequel to her widely acclaimed debut novel, My Brilliant Career. Written 1902−1904, revised c. 1935, but not published until 1946, 45 years after the previous work, it was written "as a corrective" to public perceptions of autobiographical details in what was supposedly fiction. Under the title of "The End of My Career", it was initially rejected by Angus & Robertson, the major Australian-based publisher, not just for its overt feminism, as is often claimed, but more likely for its clearly recognizable, and less than flattering, portraits of society figures and, in particular, Sybylla’s mock affair with a thinly disguised Banjo Paterson. The manuscript was lost during the First World War, and after rediscovering it, Franklin reworked and published it in 1946.

The novel is written from the perspective of Sybylla Melvyn, and apparently follows soon after the first book, when the narrator is in her late teens. However, major inconsistencies (she is now an only child) are explained by a rather complex meta-fictional device: "Sybylla II tells how she wrote an imitative draft of a novel set in England, and was advised by her schoolmaster Old Harris to draw on her own setting and experience. Her reconceived nameless first−person novel (identifiable as Career) was published in England". This novel was intended to be fiction, but she is hounded by acquaintances who claim to recognise themselves in it. These occurrences, and the story of the publication of the first book (Stella/Sybylla wrote to Henry Lawson, who sent it to an English publisher) closely mirror events in Franklin's real life.
