= Pioneers on Parade =

Book by Miles Franklin and Dymphna Cusack

- Author: Miles Franklin and Dymphna Cusack
- Language: English
- Genre: Fiction
- Publisher: Angus and Robertson
- Publication date: 1939
- Publication place: Australia
- Media type: Print
- Pages: 264pp
- Preceded by: All That Swagger; Jungfrau
- Followed by: My Career Goes Bung; Come In Spinner

Pioneers on Parade (1939) is a novel by Australian writers Miles Franklin and Dymphna Cusack.

== Story outline ==
The novel is set in Sydney during the sesqui-centenary celebrations and follows the story of the socially ambitious Mrs. du Mont-Brankston and the various visitors she receives during the celebrations.

== Critical reception ==
A reviewer in The Argus referred to the book as a "Biting Sydney Satire" and went on: "Like a cold blast striking our complacent Australian faces comes this extraordinary novel by two gifted Australian women, who seem to have seen the 150th anniversary celebrations in Sydney through the wrong end of a telescope... The faults of the book lie in the character-drawing. Burlesque, melodrama, farce, and even drama give a confusing effect. Satire falls when it is not accurately and logically directed. Many of our national failings, however, are exposed in these pages in an entertaining way that might do some of us a little good, though most of us are probably past redemption, even by such forthright crusaders as Miss Franklin and Miss Cusack."

"Habakkuk" in The Australasian also emphasised the satire and wit of the novel: "It has come along at last. A breath of tangy air blowing from fresh woods and pastures new over the dry and dusty soil in which so much of our Australian literature has its roots. We have our good writers. We get our good books from them each year. But how few of them make us laugh, or even smile. And scarce a one of them makes us chuckle. But now a new field of Australian literary endeavour has been dug, and has produced a delicious, well-handled piece of satire to make us sit up and take notice, and feel that Australian writing has some thing bright to say for itself. And it has taken two women to do it."

== See also ==
- 1939 in Australian literature
