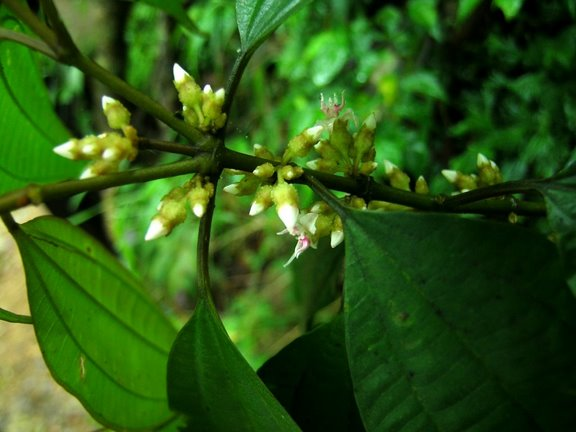
- Blastus cochinchinensis

Scientific classification
- Kingdom: Plantae
- Clade: Tracheophytes
- Clade: Angiosperms
- Clade: Eudicots
- Clade: Rosids
- Clade: Malvids
- Order: Myrtales
- Family: Melastomataceae
- Genus: Blastus; Lour.

= Blastus (plant) =

Genus of flowering plants

Blastus is a genus of plants in the family Melastomataceae. Species can be found in: Japan, China, Indo-China and west Malesia.

== Species ==
Plants of the World Online lists:

- Blastus auriculatus Y.C.Huang
- Blastus borneensis Cogn. ex Boerl.
- Blastus brevissimus C.Chen
- Blastus cochinchinensis Lour.
- Blastus eglandulosus Stapf ex Spare
- Blastus mollissimus H.L.Li
- Blastus multiflorus Guillaumin
- Blastus pauciflorus Guillaumin
- Blastus setulosus Diels
- Blastus tenuifolius Diels
- Blastus tsaii H.L.Li

== Gallery ==
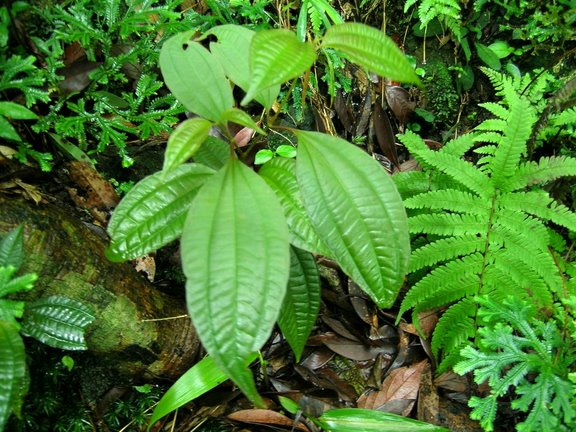
Blastus cochinchinensis

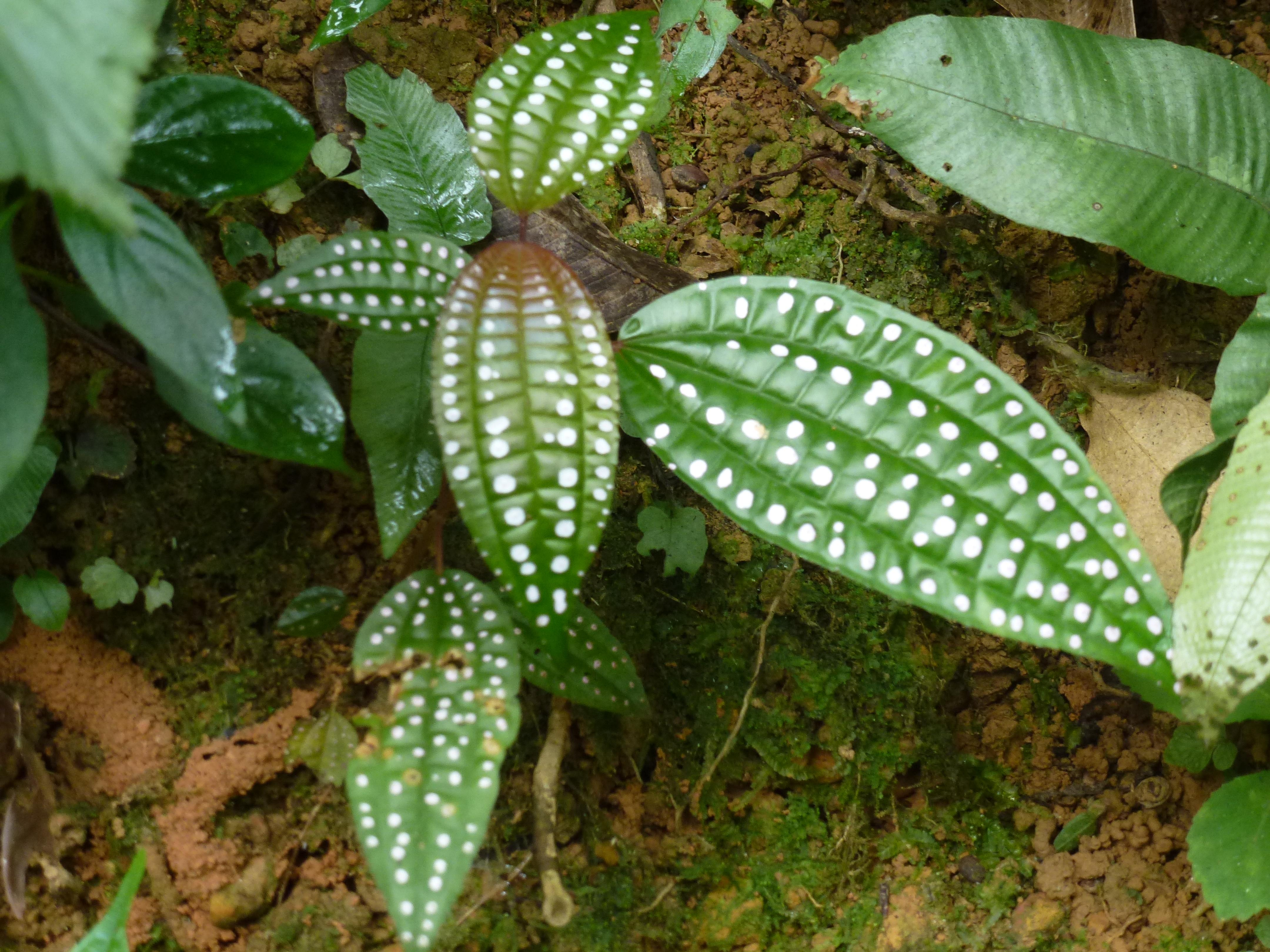
