= Old Blastus of Bandicoot =

1931 novel by Miles Franklin

- Author: Miles Franklin
- Language: English
- Genre: Fiction
- Publisher: Cecil Palmer, London
- Publication date: 1931
- Publication place: Australia
- Media type: Print
- Pages: 280pp
- Preceded by: Back to Bool Bool
- Followed by: Bring the Monkey

Old Blastus of Bandicoot (1931) is a novel by Australian writer Miles Franklin.

== Story outline ==
The novel concerns an old pioneer squatter in the Murrumbidgee country near Canberra. The Barry and Lindsey families hold adjoining properties and are in dispute over a matrimonial disagreement. In this case one of the Lindseys has jilted the eldest daughter of Old Blastus.

== Critical reception ==
After acknowledging that Franklin was most probably the author of the "Brent of Bin Bin" novels, a reviewer in The Brisbane Courier concluded: "Old Blastus has distinct merit as a novel, but its outstanding significance lies in the brilliant searchlight that it throws across an important period of pioneering in an old district in New South Wales, that happy period before the motor car had begun to dispossess the horse of his kingdom. Old Blastus of Bandicoot is a fine book, and it is likely to become an Australian classic, ranking side by side with Brent of Bin Bin and Henry Kingsley's Geoffry Hamlyn."

While noting that the title is "unattractive" a reviewer in The Age was also impressed with the book: "Stories of Australian bush life which descend to broad farce are numerous and have grown a little tiresome. In Old Blastus of Bandicoot Miles Franklin gives us humor, but also she tells a story worth the telling of a girl's tragedy, of men's futile hates and prejudices, and of the triumph of innate decency. It is a stimulating story, genuinely Australian in atmospheres."

== See also ==
- 1931 in Australian literature
