= Anne Spencer Parry =

Australian fantasy writer (1931–1985)

Anne Spencer Parry

Anne Spencer Parry (1931 – 26 January 1985) was one of the first Australian writers of fantasy.

== Life ==
Anne Spencer Parry was born in Melbourne in 1931. Her family moved to Sydney when she was 16 where she attended Hornsby Girls School.

She studied as a mature student at the University of NSW and graduated BA (Bachelor of Arts - English). She was a psychotherapist in private practice in Sydney.

In 1976, Parry's first work was published by The Pinchgut Press, a publishing organisation founded by friend and poet Marjorie Pizer and her husband in 1947. The Pinchgut Press went on to publish many of Anne's books. In 1980 Ashton Scholastic re-published her first four books, issuing a number of reprintings over the course of the decade.

Parry was in partnership with Marjorie Pizer in their psychotherapy practice. Marjorie dedicated her 1988 poetry collection 'Equinox' to Parry: "Equinox is in memory of my dear friend and partner, Anne Spencer Parry, who died of cancer ... we worked together as partners for over 20 years as psychotherapists, as writers and as publishers ...”

She is acknowledged as Jewish writer, but was not from a Jewish family; she converted to Judaism later in life.

Parry died in Cremorne, Sydney after a short battle with cancer in 1985, aged 53.

== Works ==
Parry wrote a series of portal fantasy youth fiction beginning with The Land Behind the World (1976), in which a young girl finds a magic land through a magic portal. The series was written mainly for children, but was appreciated by adults as well.

Her work was received well by critics. Steven Garlick writing in Tharunka - the UNSW newspaper - reviewed the first two books and wrote "What happens when a brilliant Jungian and a Gestalt-inspired psychotherapist writes simple, unpretentious "children's tales"? The result is the delightful and only apparently simple books by Anne Spencer Parry, The Land Behind the World and The Lost Souls of the Twilight, the first two in a series, reminiscent of Tolkien and Ursula LeGuin's Earthsea Triology." He concluded by saying "Both tales had that timeless quality that communicates directly to the spirit" and he recommended the books for "anyone interested in psychology, growth, children, personal development or just life in general."

Her work is in print as of 2018, although most of her books were out of print prior to 2010. In 2010 and 2011, her Land Behind the World Series was made available again from Pinchgut Press via a print on demand service. This includes two previously unpublished works to complete the second series, The Council of Elders and The Signbearers. Her last novel, The Immortals, was published posthumously in 2011 and was the first book of a planned quartet set in the dawn of time in The Land Behind the World.

=== Bibliography ===
The Bara cycle:

- The Land Behind the World (1976)
- The Lost Souls of the Twilight (1977)
- The Crown of Darkness (1979)
- The Crown of Light (1980)

The Zaddik cycle:

- Zaddik and the Seafarers (1983)
- Beyond the Outlandish Mountains (1984)
- The Council of Elders (2011)
- The Signbearers (2011)

Unnamed series:

- The Immortals (2011)

Other works:

- Below The Surface:Reflections on Life and Living (1982)
