= Night Fall in the Ti-Tree =

1905 Australian children's picture book

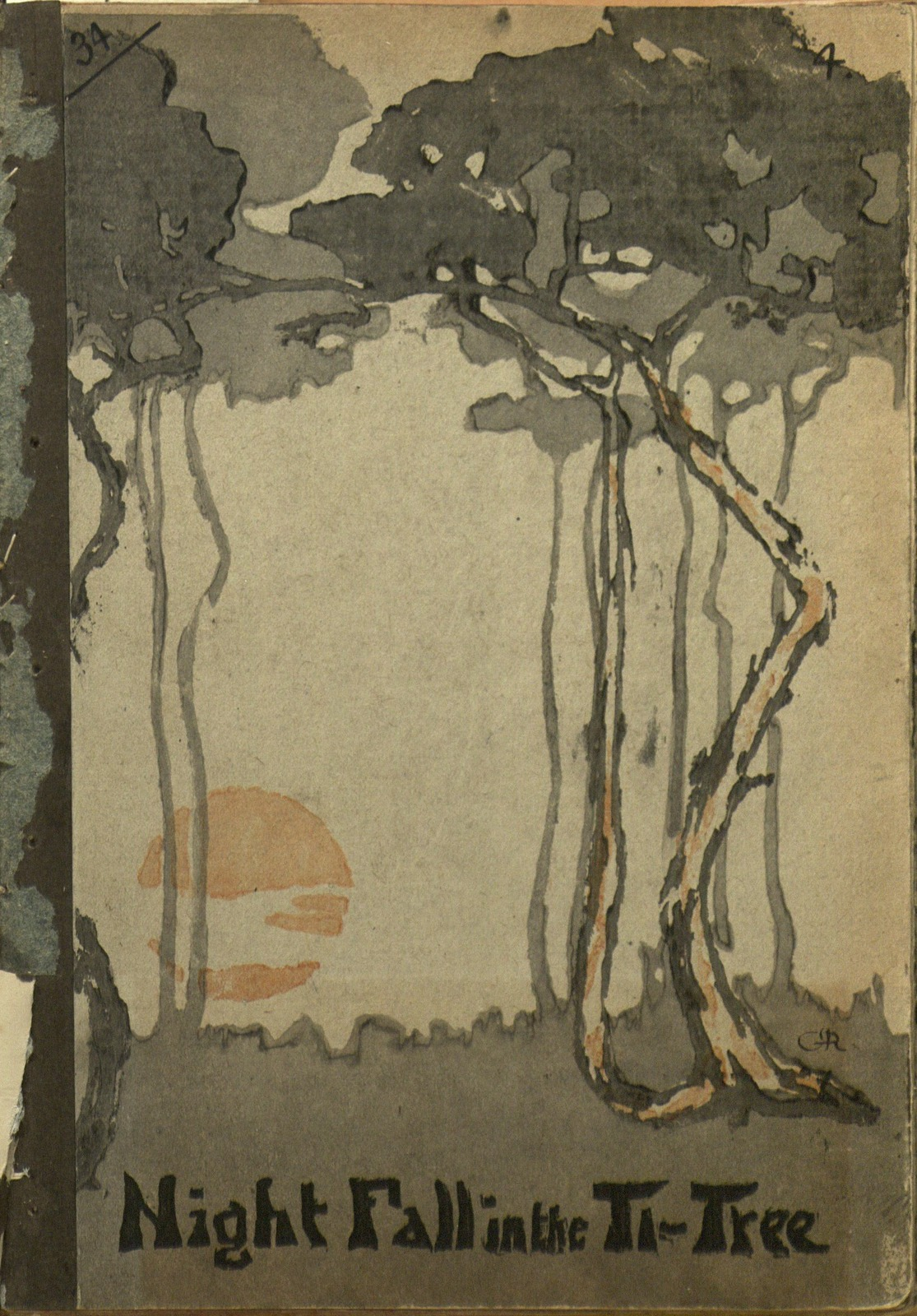
- Front cover of Night Fall in the Ti-Tree; Front cover of Night Fall in the Ti-Tree, courtesy of State Library Victoria
- Author: Violet Teague
- Illustrators: Violet Teague, Geraldine Rede
- Language: English
- Genre: Artist's book, Children's picture book, poetry
- Published: 1905 (Sign of the Rabbit)
- Publication place: Australia
- Media type: Print (paperback)
- Pages: 32 (unpaginated)
- OCLC: 216973102

Night Fall in the Ti-Tree is a 1905 artist's book by Violet Teague and Geraldine Rede. It is about a family of rabbits and is known as the first Australian work using colour relief printing.

== Publication history ==
- 1905, Australia, Sign of the Rabbit, Paperback
- 1906, England, Elkin Mathews, Paperback
- 1988, Australia, Australian National Gallery, ISBN 9780642130723, Paperback

== Collections ==
Night Fall is held in a number of gallery and library collections including:

- Art Gallery of New South Wales (1905 ed.)
- National Gallery of Australia (1905 ed.)
- National Gallery of Victoria (1905 ed.)
- Queensland Art Gallery (1905 ed.)
- Art Gallery of Ballarat (1906 ed.)
- Art Gallery of South Australia (1906 ed.)
- Baillieu Library (1906 ed.)
- Boston Athenæum (1906 ed.)
- James G. Nelson Library (Columbia University Libraries) (1906 ed.)
- University of Delaware Library (1906 ed.)
