= John Sandes =

Australian author (1863–1938)

- Born: 26 February 1863; County Cork, Ireland
- Died: 29 November 1938 (aged 75)
- Writing career
- Language: English
- Years active: 1887–1938

John Sandes (26 February 1863 – 29 November 1938) was an Australian poet, journalist and author.

== Early life ==
Sandes was born in Cork, Ireland, the son of the Rev. Samuel Dickson Sandes, and his wife Sophia Julia, née Besnard. John Sandes was taken to England in 1872 and educated at King's College London, Trinity College in Stratford-upon-Avon, and Oxford University, where he graduated B.A. in 1885.

== Bibliography ==
=== Novels ===
- Love and the Aeroplane : A Tale of To-morrow (1910)
- Gentlneman Jack, Bushranger (1911)
- Designing Fate (1912)
- For Turon Gold : A Tale of the Fifties (1913)
- The Captain of the Gang (19130
- A Rebel of the Bush : A Romance of the Reign of Macquarie (1913)
- The Call of the Southern Cross : A Romance of Australia (1914)
- The White Champion : A Story of the Australian Ring (1917)

=== Poetry collections ===
- Rhymes of the Times (1898)
- Ballads of Battle (1900)
- Australia's Christmas Greeting (1914)
- The Escort (1925)
