= Violet Teague =

Australian artist (1872–1951)

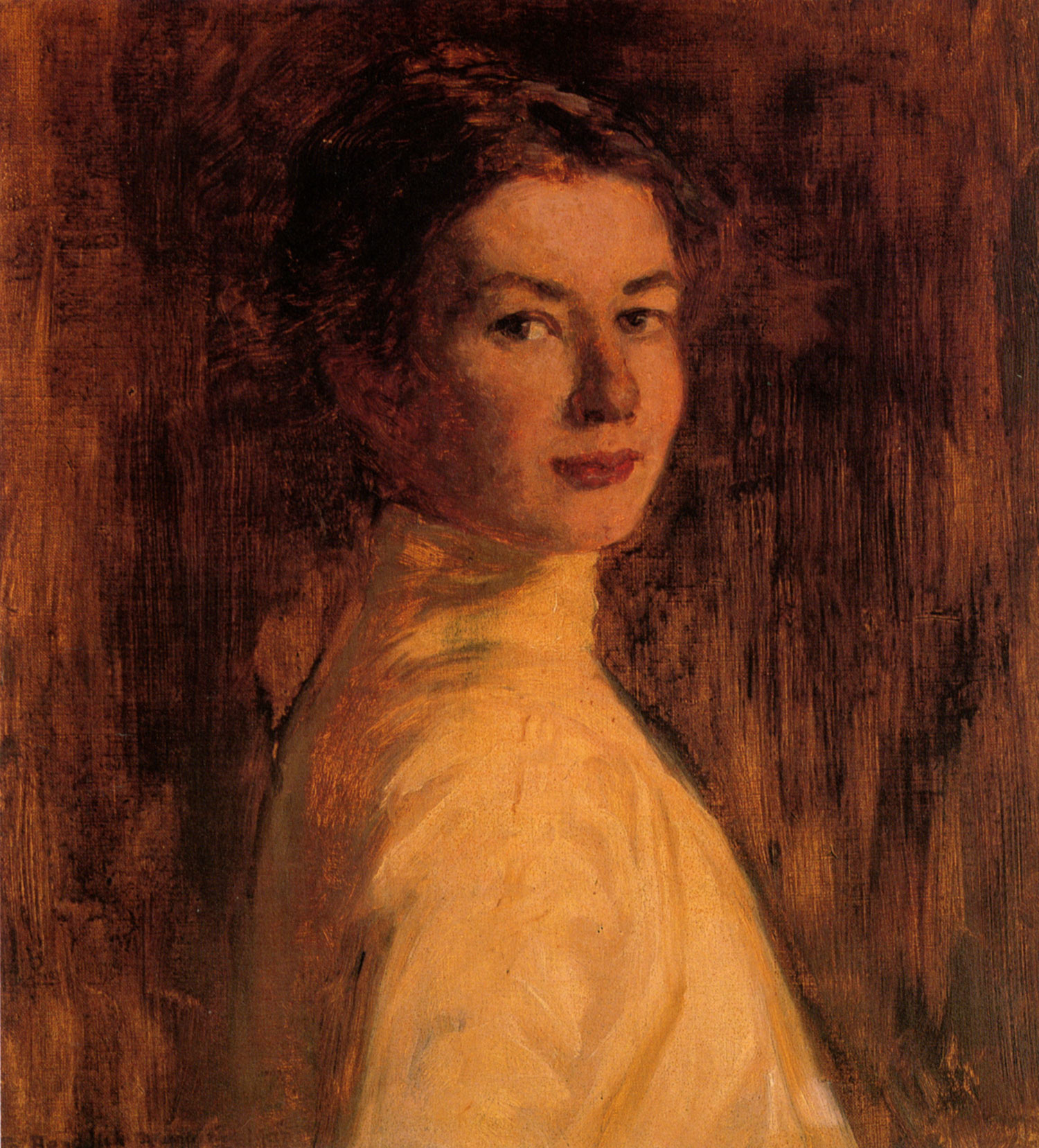
- Self portrait (1899)
- Born: 21 February 1872; Melbourne, Victoria, Australia
- Died: 30 September 1951 (aged 79); Mount Eliza, Victoria, Australia
- Education: National Gallery of Victoria Art School, Melbourne
- Known for: Etching, lithography
- Notable work: Night Fall in the Ti-Tree (1905); The Boy with the Palette (1911)
- Awards: Bendigo Jubilee Exhibition gold medal, 1901

Violet Helen Evangeline Teague (21 February 1872 – 30 September 1951) was an Australian artist, noted for her painting, printmaking and her critical writings on art.

== Early life and training ==
The only daughter of Melbourne homeopath James Teague and his wife Eliza Jane Miller, Teague was born on 21 February 1872 in Melbourne. Her mother died while she was an infant, and she was raised by her father and his second wife, Sybella, along with Sybella's two children. Teague was taught by a governess at home, and her education included French and the classics. She completed college at the Presbyterian Ladies' College, Melbourne.

Violet travelled to Europe to study painting, from 1893-96 with French artist Ernest Blanc-Garin in his Brussels studio then 1896-97 at Hubert von Herkomer's school, Bushey, Hertfordshire. Returning to Melbourne she enrolled at the National Gallery of Victoria Art School 1897-1900, while also studying with E. Phillips Fox and Tudor St George Tucker at their Melbourne School of Art which ran 1893-99, and which taught in the manner of French Impressionist schools which the two teachers attended, and with more liberal methods than the academy-style instruction of the National Gallery of Victoria art schools. A summer school was offered at Charterisville that Fox and Tucker had established in the old mansion above the Yarra River in East Ivanhoe, the lease of which they had taken over from Walter Withers in 1893. It was Australia's first recognised summer school of art. The women, including Ina Gregory, Mary Meyer, Bertha Merfield, Henrietta Irving, Ursula Foster and Helen Peters were accommodated in rooms of the stone house and a chaperon and housekeeper looked after them and Violet may have been their tutor.

Teague travelled with her family in Europe as a young woman. She toured widely, and visited galleries in Germany, France, Belgium the Netherlands and England. In 1901, she recalled visiting Spanish galleries during her childhood, and commented "never shall I forget the Velazquez, with their beautiful horses and exquisite colouring, or the lovely Raphaels".

== Career ==
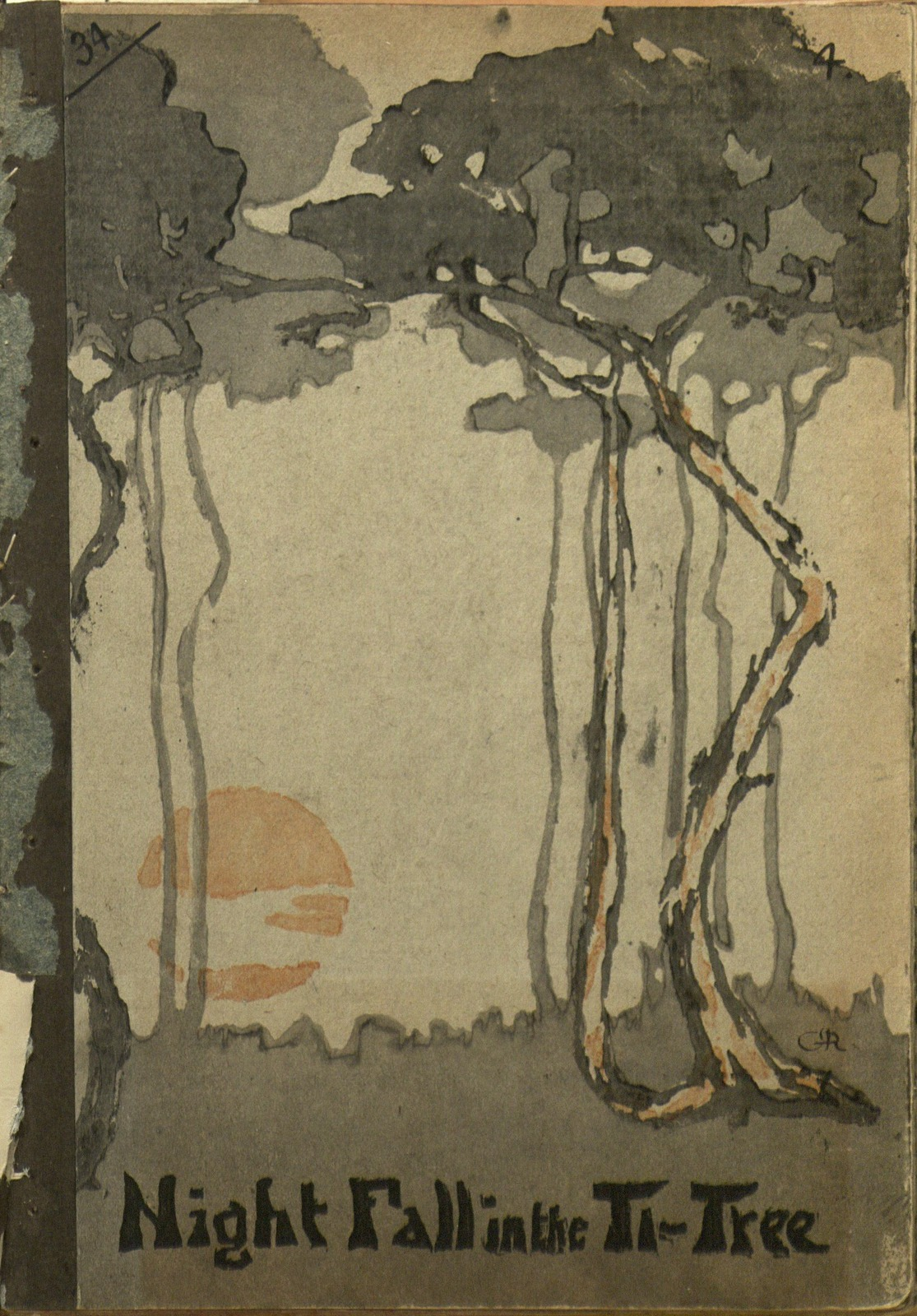
Cover of Night Fall in the Ti-Tree, 1905

Teague exhibited regularly at the Paris Salons, and her portrait of a Colonel Rede in 1897 at the Société des Artistes Français brought her accolades.

In 1902 she was appointed to the council of the Victorian Artists Society which published her poem 'A Cloud Fantasy' in its journal.

She was "the first Australian to demonstrate a sustained interest in, and an understanding of Japanese woodblock printmaking". Printing from woodblock had a long history in Japan. She collaborated in woodcuts with her friend Geraldine Rede, publishing Night Fall in the Ti-Tree together from her Collins Street studio in 1905. The 32-page Haiku-style text tells the story of the simple life of bushland rabbits with 16 coloured woodblock illustrations. This collaborative little book is the first example of coloured woodblock printing in Australia, and also the first Australian artists' book.

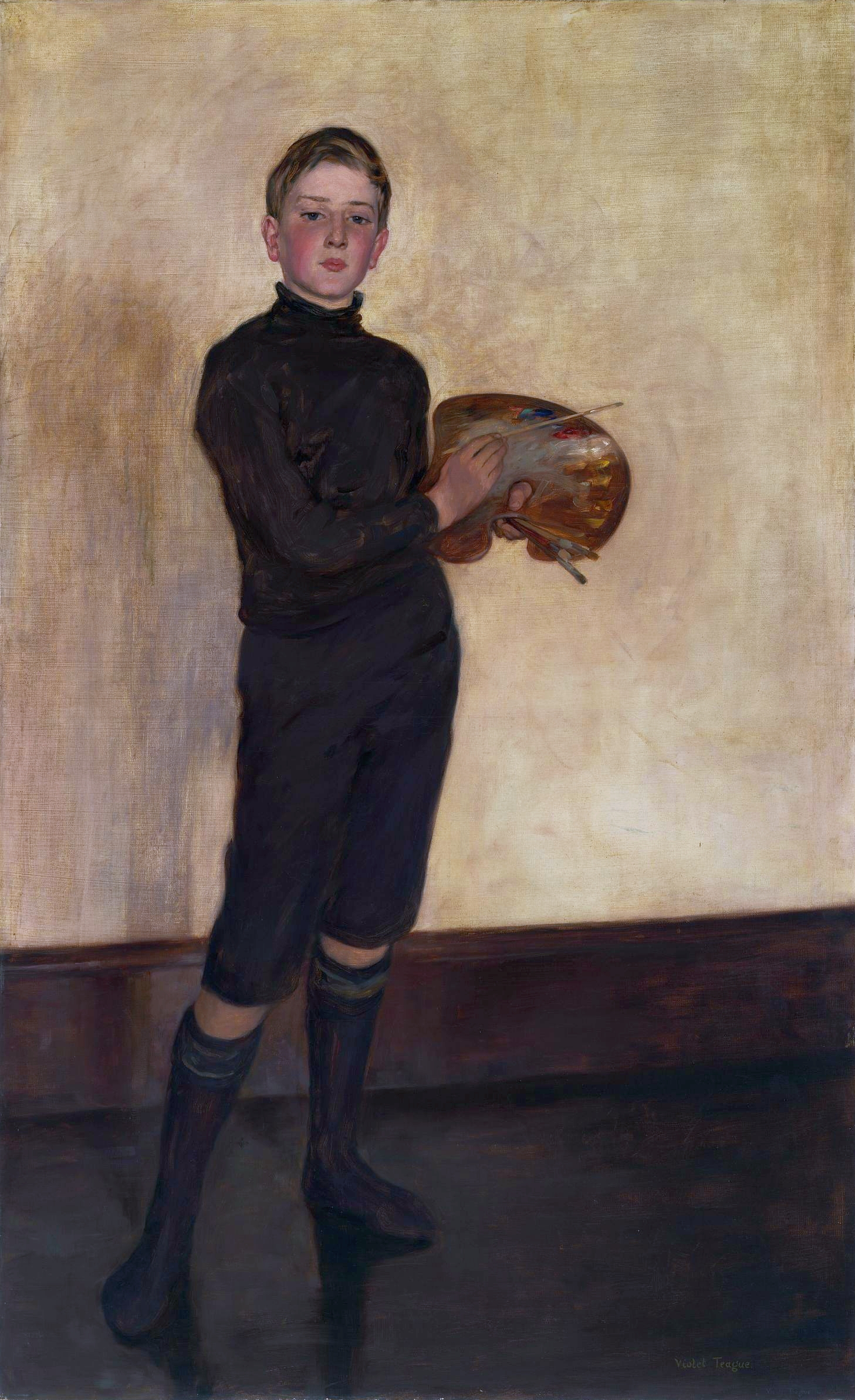
The Boy with the Palette, 1911

Her painting Boy with a Palette won a silver prize from the Old Salon, Paris when exhibited in 1920, and was later hung at the Royal Academy of Arts, London.

Following the 1920 Paris Salon, Australian artist Rupert Bunny wrote to Teague, and observed that The Boy with the Palette was one of the best works in that year's exhibition at the Old Salon.

One of the most unusual aspects of Teague's oeuvre, one that lacks almost any precedents in Australian art, was the creation of altar paintings and banners for Protestant churches. The first was a 1910 commission (now in the Hamilton art gallery) for a church in Wannon, Victoria, where her brother worshipped. The frame for the work was designed by her friend, artist Jessie Traill. In 1921, Teague exhibited an altar piece (now at St. Paul's Cathedral, Melbourne) for a new church at Kinglake, Victoria, built as a memorial to soldiers who died in World War I. Inscriptions to accompany the picture were again prepared by Traill, and placed on the base of the work. The painting was Teague's most prominent work at a solo exhibition held at the Melbourne Athenaeum in 1921.

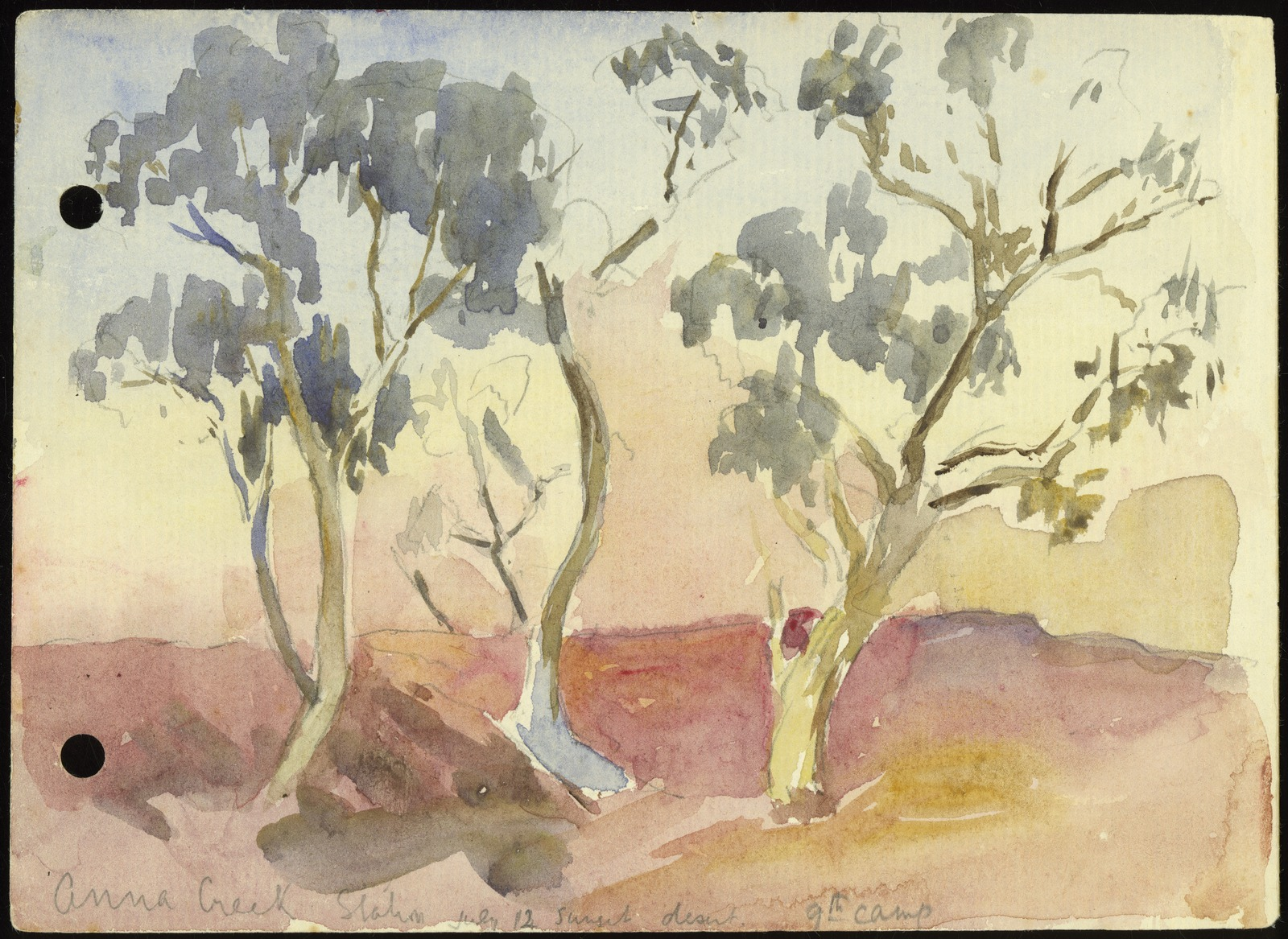
Watercolour made during a trip to Central Australia in the early 1930s

In 1933 Teague, her sister Una and their friend Jessie Traill, travelled across the outback by car to visit the Hermannsburg Mission. Teague befriended famed Aboriginal artist Albert Namatjira, who named one of his children after her and accompanied the group on their painting excursions. The Mission had recently suffered a drought resulting in the deaths of a third of the Aboriginal population. In Melbourne the sisters organised and exhibition to raise more than £2,000 towards a pipeline to help transport water to the Mission. Works in the exhibition were donated by Traill, Frederick McCubbin, E. Phillips Fox and Hans Heysen. The pipeline was laid in 1935 from Kaporilja Springs to the Mission.

== Writing ==
Juliette Peers, in a number of her papers, identifies Teague's writing as an overlooked aspect of the artist's career. Teague provided commentary on Australian art in letters and essays, including a panegyric on E. Phillips Fox at his passing, on the 'Latest Felton Bequest Purchases' in The quarterly journal: members newsletter of the Victorian Artists Society of 1 July 1911, and 'Some Thoughts on Art' in The Advance Australia.

She was an outlier, in letters to The Argus, The Age, and The Herald, announcing Hermannsburg group exhibition, in taking a position that Aboriginal people had survived '100 years of our occupation,' cheated of their inheritance by colonialism, thus defying the eugenicist justification that they were an innately inferior 'dying race'.

== Exhibitions ==
Exhibitions include:

- 14 July 1905 – 19 August 1905, Winter Exhibition, Victorian Artists' Society Galleries
- 10 November 1905 – 2 December 1905, Eight Federal Art Exhibition, Society of Artists' Royal South Australian Society of Arts Gallery
- 1906, Annual Exhibition, Victorian Artists' Society Galleries
- 23 October 1907 – 30 November 1907, First Australian Exhibition of Women's Work, Multiple venues
- 1908, Exhibition, Bradley's Rooms
- 2 December 1908 – 12 December 1908, Arts and Crafts Society of Victoria exhibition, Guild Hall
- 1909, Winter Exhibition, Victorian Artists' Society Galleries
- 1911, Annual Exhibition, Victorian Artists' Society Galleries
- 1911, The Boy with the palette, National Gallery of Australia, Canberra
- 12 July 1912 – 10 August 1912, Annual Exhibition, Victorian Artists' Society Galleries
- 29 April 1914 – 23 May 1914, Annual Exhibition, Victorian Artists' Society Galleries
- 1915, Australian Artists' War Fund exhibition, Vickery's Chambers. Foreword by Ethel Phillips Fox mentions that Sydney artists contributed works of art valued £1500 to £2000, which was distributed as prizes to subscribers.
- 6 July - 20 July 1918, Salon des Poilus, Exhibition of Pictures for Sale, Athenaeum Gallery, Melbourne
- 12 – 26 November 1919, Arts and Crafts Society Exhibition, Federal Court House
- 1925, Loan Exhibition of Australian Paintings, National Gallery of Victoria, Melbourne
- 16-26 November 1934, Heidelberg Art Exhibition, Catalogue of the Heidelberg and District Art Exhibition, Ivanhoe Hall, Heidelberg, Germany
- 1 November 1940 – 1 December 1940, Representative collection of Australian art, Margaret Maclean's Gallery
- 18 August - 3 September 1978, A Selection of Woodcuts and Linocuts by Napier Waller and other Melbourne Artists
- 4 March - 3 April 1980, Melbourne/Monash Exchange Exhibition, Monash University Gallery, Melbourne
- 19 September - 8 October 1986, Australian Women Artists, Paintings, Watercolours & Prints, Bridget McDonnell Gallery, Melbourne
- 17 - 24 September 1989, Spring exhibition, Jim Alexander Gallery, Melbourne
- 11 - 23 July 1995, Violet Teague Portrait Prize, The Melbourne Society of Women Painters and Sculptors and the Victorian Artists Society, Melbourne
- 17 July - 29 August 1999, The art of Violet Teague, touring exhibition by The Ian Potter Museum of Art, Geelong Art Gallery, Geelong, Victoria
- 10 September - 31 October 1999, The art of Violet Teague, touring exhibition by The Ian Potter Museum of Art, Mornington Peninsula Regional Gallery, Victoria
- 9 November - 12 December 1999, The art of Violet Teague, touring exhibition by The Ian Potter Museum of Art, Hamilton Art Gallery, Hamilton
- 18 Mart - 23 April 2000, The art of Violet Teague, touring exhibition by The Ian Potter Museum of Art, Bendigo Art Gallery, Bendigo
- 13 May - 11 June 2000, The art of Violet Teague, touring exhibition by The Ian Potter Museum of Art, National Trust Centre, Sydney
- 17 December - 12 March 2000, The art of Violet Teague, touring exhibition by The Ian Potter Museum of Art, The University of Melbourne
- 28 November - 31 December 2015, PROGRESSION Women in Australian Art, Day Fine Art
- 24 May - 7 September 2025, Dangerously Modern: Australian Women Artists in Europe 1890–1940, Art Gallery of South Australia

== Published works ==
Birds of the sunny south, with Australian flowers / produced entirely by Australians (V. Teague, G. Rede, I. Gregory, A. Ashley) [Melbourne] 1915(?) : Pater's Printery

Night fall in the ti-tree / woodcuts by Geraldine Rede and Violet Teague, [Melbourne] 1905 : Sign of the Rabbit

== Legacy ==
Teague has been reckoned among the best portraitists Australia has produced. Teague has also been identified as one of Australia's first female art critics.

Teague Street in the Canberra suburb of Cook is named in her honour.
