= Miles Franklin =

Australian writer and feminist (1879–1954)

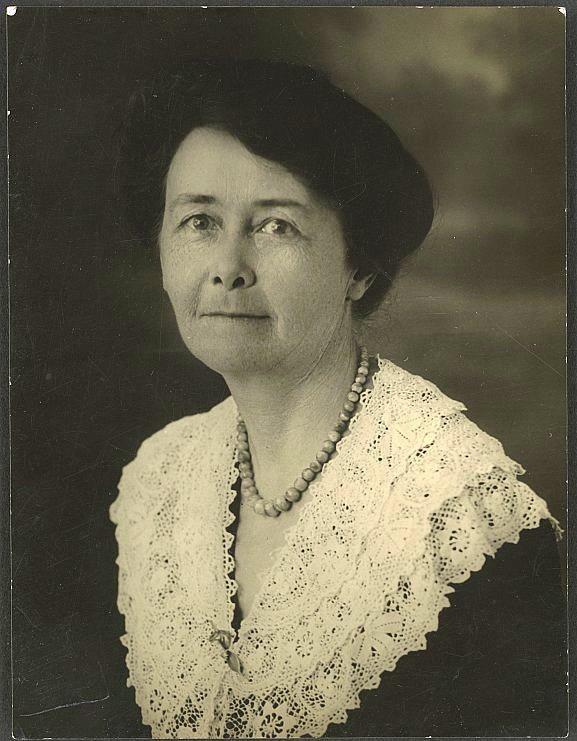
- Miles Franklin in 1940's
- Born: Stella Maria Sarah Miles Franklin; 14 October 1879; Talbingo, New South Wales, Australia
- Died: 19 September 1954 (aged 74); Drummoyne, New South Wales, Australia
- Other names: Brent of Bin Bin, An Old Bachelor, Vernacular, Ogniblat, Mr and Mrs Ogniblat L'Artsau
- Known for: Novelist, writer, feminist
- Website: http://www.milesfranklin.com.au/

Stella Maria Sarah Miles Franklin (14 October 1879 – 19 September 1954), known as Miles Franklin, was an Australian writer and feminist who is best known for her novel My Brilliant Career, published by Blackwoods of Edinburgh in 1901. While she wrote throughout her life, her other major literary success, All That Swagger, was not published until 1936.

She was committed to the development of a uniquely Australian form of literature, and she actively pursued this goal by supporting writers, literary journals, and writers' organisations. She has had a long-lasting impact on Australian literary life through her endowment of a major annual prize for literature about "Australian Life in any of its phases", the Miles Franklin Award. Her impact was further recognised in 2013 with the creation of the Stella Prize, awarded annually for the best work of literature by an Australian woman.

== Life and career ==
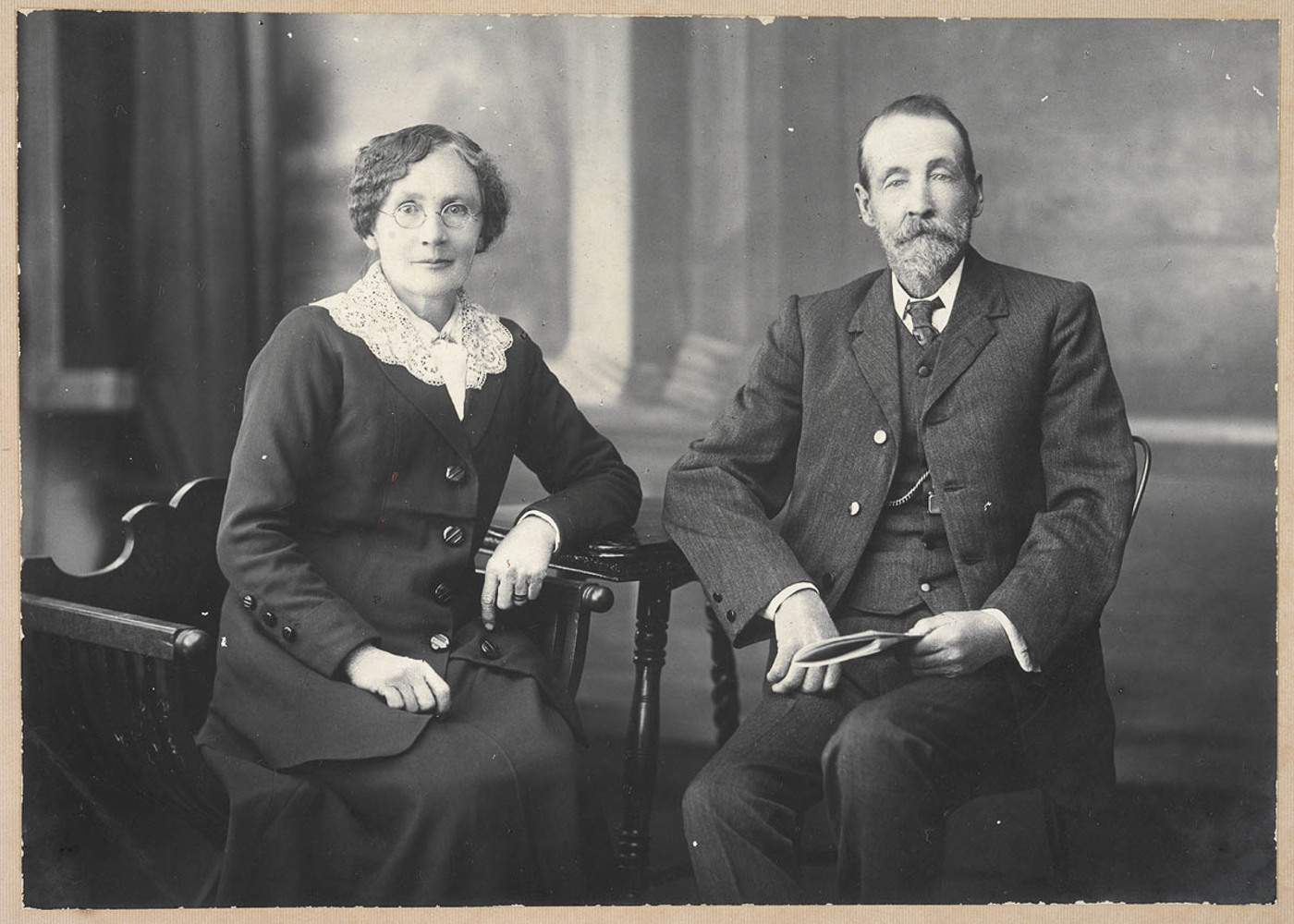
Franklin's parents Suzannah and John Franklin

Franklin was born at Talbingo, New South Wales, and grew up in the Brindabella Valley on a property called Brindabella Station. She was the eldest child of Australian-born parents, John Maurice Franklin and Susannah Margaret Eleanor Franklin, née Lampe, who was the great-granddaughter of Edward Miles (or Moyle) who had arrived with the First Fleet in the Scarborough with a seven-year sentence for theft. Her family was a member of the squattocracy. She was educated at home until 1889 when she attended Thornford Public. During this period she was encouraged in her writing by her teacher, Mary Gillespie (1856–1938) and Tom Hebblewhite (1857–1923) editor of the local Goulburn newspaper.

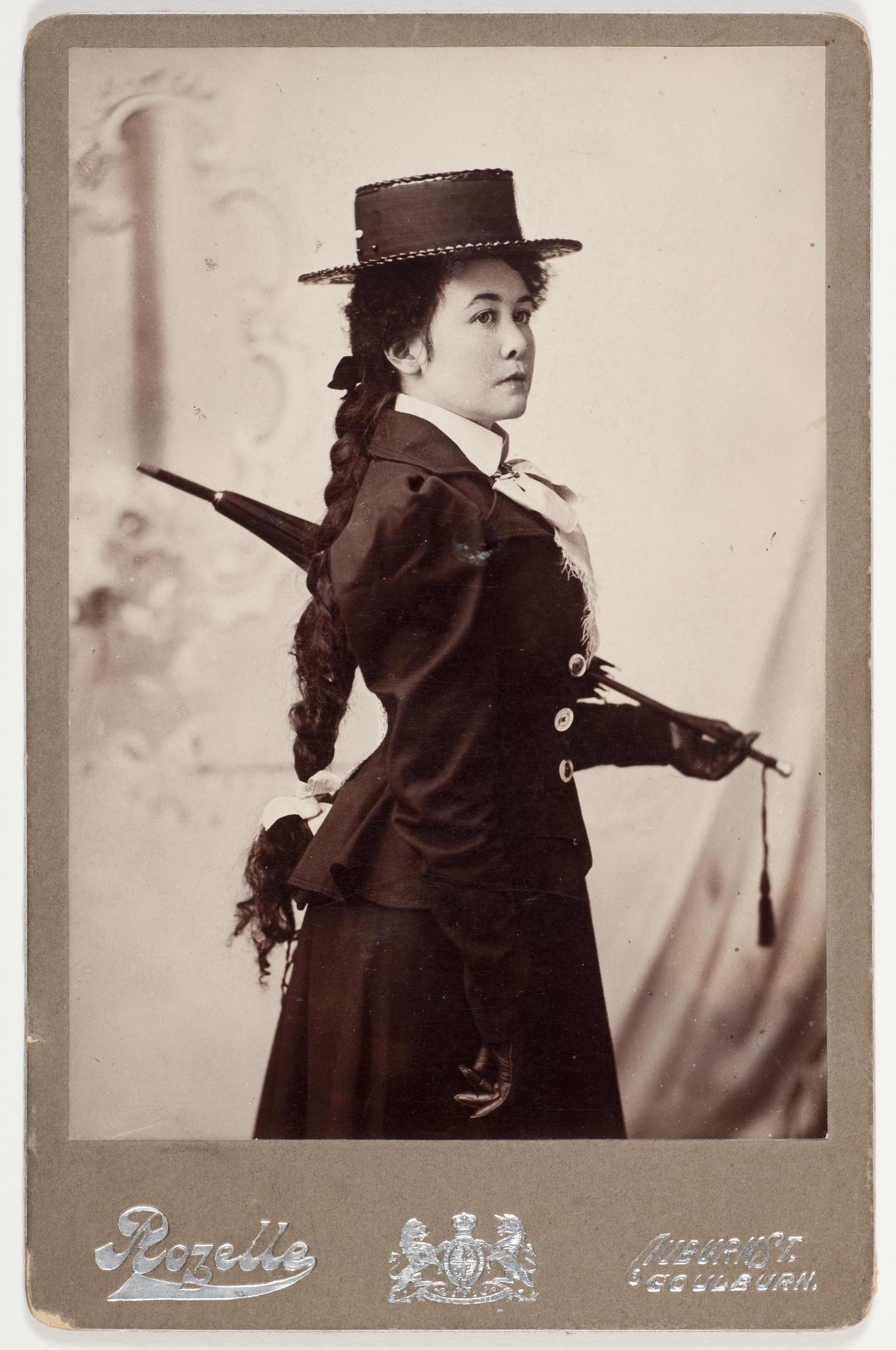
Franklin in 1901

Her best known novel, My Brilliant Career, tells the story of an irrepressible teenage girl, Sybylla Melvyn, growing to womanhood in rural New South Wales. It was published in 1901 with the support of Australian writer, Henry Lawson. After its publication, Franklin tried a career in nursing, and then as a housemaid in Sydney and Melbourne. While doing this she contributed pieces to The Daily Telegraph and The Sydney Morning Herald under the pseudonyms "An Old Bachelor" and "Vernacular." During this period she wrote My Career Goes Bung in which Sybylla encounters the Sydney literary set, but it was not released to the public until 1946. An overtly anti-war play, The Dead Must Not Return, was not published or performed but received a public reading in September 2009.

=== In the United States and England ===
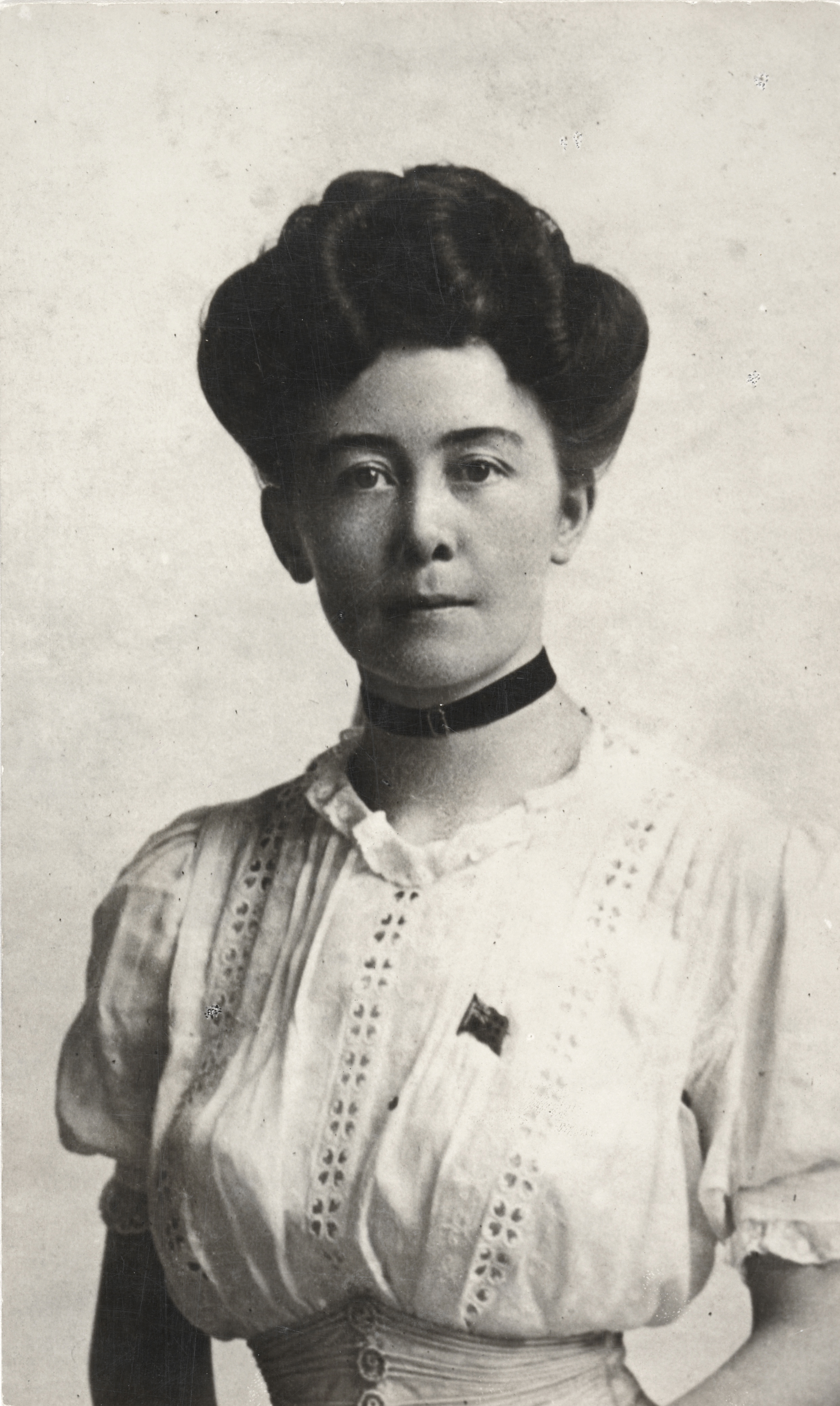
Undated photo

In 1906, Franklin moved to the US, specifically Chicago, where she met Alice Henry, an Australian reformer and suffragist, as well as Margret Drier Robins, newly elected President of the National Women's Trade Union League. Franklin first began as Robins personal secretary in 1908, but soon became an "unofficial" secretary for Alice Henry at the NWTUL and assistant editor for the leagues magazine, Life and Labour. Franklin’s time in the US is a major aspect of her feminist involvement and achievement throughout her life. Her work at the NWTUL included organising the biennial NWTUL conventions, contributed to lobbying and direct support for working women through rallies and strikes work. Franklin also made a presentation in New York in June 1915, at the fifth biennial NWTUL convention. Here she received thanks from Rose Schneiderman, chief organiser for the New York Women's Trade Union League, for her work and contribution to the league.

"...we wish here to give our expression of love and confidence and goodwill to Stella Franklin, who has served for so many years as secretary and associate editor, and has given the very best that is her to the work."

— Rose Schneiderman, congratulatory speech to Miles Franklin

Her years in the US are reflected in On Dearborn Street (not published until 1981), a love story that uses American slang in a manner not dissimilar to the early work of Dashiell Hammett. Also while in America she wrote Some Everyday Folk and Dawn (1909), the story of a small-town Australian family, which uses purple prose for deliberate comic effect. She suffered regular bouts of ill health and entered a sanatorium for a period in 1912. In 1915, she travelled to England and worked as a cook and earned some money from journalism. In March 1917 Franklin volunteered for war work in the Ostrovo Unit of the Scottish Women's Hospitals during the Serbian campaigns of 1917–18. She served as a cook and later matron's orderly in a 200-bed tent hospital attached to the Serbian army near Lake Ostrovo in Macedonian Greece from July 1917 to February 1918.

Was made staff cook against my will. ... Then Miss Brown made a row with everyone & insisted on being head. I just let 'em muddle along and take no notice as I've had a year's training in London of English ways. Will think my own thoughts and write a book if the plot comes into my head.

— Miles Franklin (personal diary), describing her wartime service

From 1919 to 1926 Franklin worked as Secretary with the National Housing and Town Planning Association in London. She organised a women's international housing convention in 1924. Her life in England in the 1920s gave rise to Bring the Monkey (1933), a satire on the English country house mystery novel. The book reveals Franklin's views on nationality and class. The book was a literary and commercial failure.

=== Return to Australia ===
Franklin resettled in Australia in 1932 after the death of her father in 1931. During that decade she wrote several historical novels of the Australian bush, most of which were published under the pseudonym "Brent of Bin Bin". New South Wales State Librarian, Dagmar Schmidmaier, said "Miles increasingly feared that nothing she wrote matched the success of My Brilliant Career and resorted to writing under different names, including the pseudonym Brent of Bin Bin, to protect herself from poor reviews." However, All That Swagger was published under her own name in 1936, winning the S. H. Prior Memorial Prize. Franklin also won the S. H. Prior Memorial Prize in 1939 together with Kate Baker for their collaborative work 'Who Was Joseph Furphy?'.

Throughout her life, Franklin actively supported Australian literature. She joined the Fellowship of Australian Writers in 1933 and the Sydney PEN Club in 1935. She encouraged young writers such as Jean Devanny, Sumner Locke Elliott and Ric Throssell and she supported the new literary journals, Meanjin and Southerly. Miles entertained literary figures at her home in Carlton, NSW. An autograph book known as Miles Franklin's Waratah Book held by the State Library of NSW was used for autographs and inscriptions. Guests were encouraged to drink tea from the Waratah Cup, an octagonal, Royal Doulton cup, designed by Sydney born Lulu Shorter and to write in the Waratah Book.

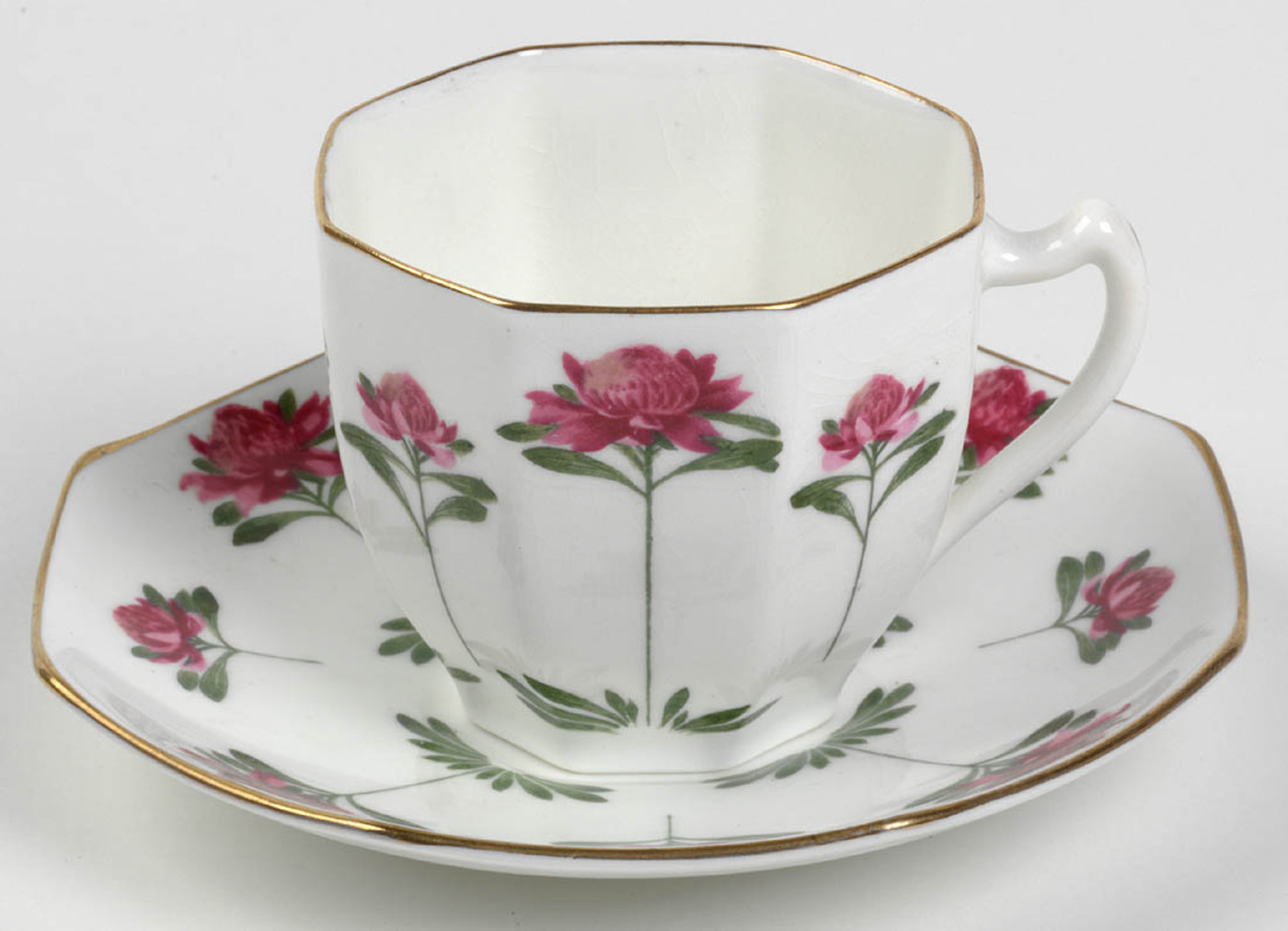
Miles Franklin's waratah cup and saucer 1904. This cup is part of the collection of the State Library of NSW

In 1937, Franklin declined appointment as an Officer of the Order of the British Empire having taken offence to the appointment of compatriot poet Mary Gilmore to the higher honour of Dame Commander within the same order.

In this period of her life Franklin was a constant attendee and speaker at various cultural and literary events. Her message was centred on free speech and the championing of Australian literature. Franklin was not a member of any political party, although her diaries reveal an interest in socialism and ASIO did have a file on Franklin during the Cold War. Franklin's literary friend P.R. ('Inky') Stephenson launched the pro-isolationist, anti-war Australia First Movement in late 1941, to which Franklin was vehemently opposed, as evidenced by her diary entries and correspondence at the time - "Reds or pinks or 'rightists' all showed their ignorance" she wrote after attending a AFM meeting, and of Stephenson "I could not have anything to do with his politics". Franklin was staunchly anti-war and, traumatized by her WWI experiences, very much feared a war on Australian soil at this time.

While Miles Franklin had many suitors, she never married. She died on 19 September 1954, aged 74 and her ashes were scattered in Jounama Creek, Talbingo close to where she was born.

== Collaborations ==
Miles Franklin engaged in a number of literary collaborations throughout her life. In addition to co-editing the journal Life and Labor with Alice Henry in the US, she also wrote Pioneers on Parade in collaboration with Dymphna Cusack and a biography of Joseph Furphy (1944) "in painful collaboration with Kate Baker". Previously, in 1939, she and Baker had won the Prior Memorial prize for an essay on Furphy.

Dever writes that the letters between Dymphna Cusack and Miles Franklin that are published in Yarn Spinners "provide a see-sawing commentary on the delicate art of literary collaboration".

== Legacy ==
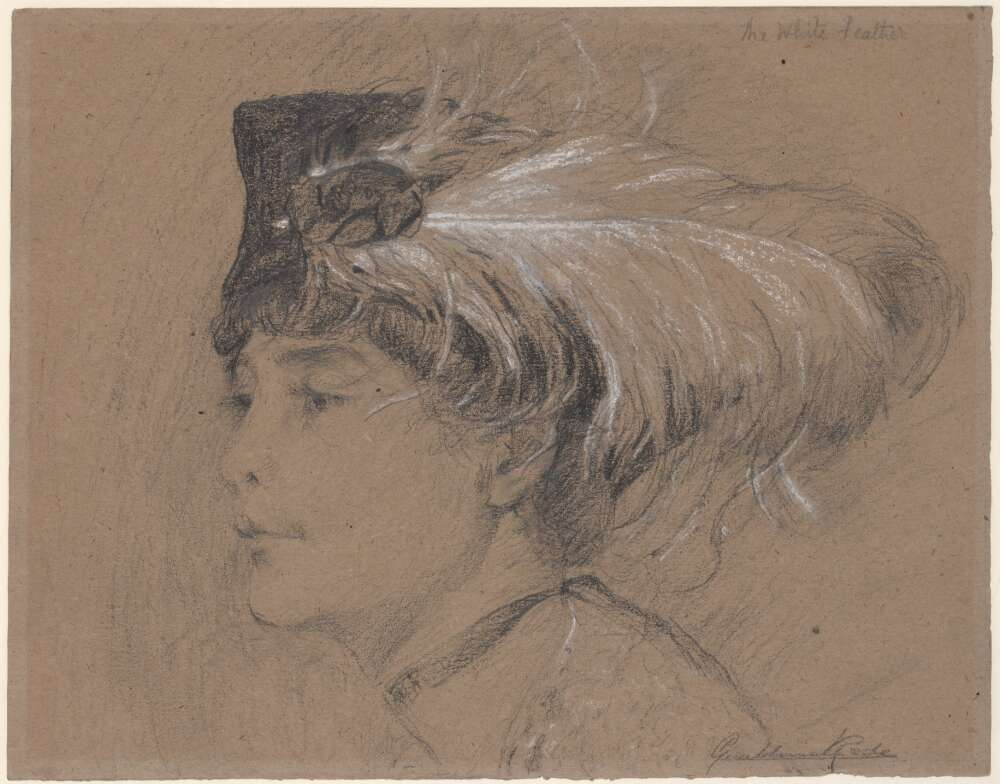
Sketch of Franklin by Geraldine Rede

In her will she made a bequest for her estate to establish an annual literary award known as The Miles Franklin Award. The first winner was Patrick White with Voss in 1957. Later, in 2013, the Stella Prize, derived from Franklin's full name, was created after concern over poor presentation of female authors in the Miles Franklin Award and honours female and non-binary Australian authors in all genres.

The Miles Franklin Literary Award is recognised as Australia's most prestigious literary prize and the first award of its kind in the country. The honour was established in accordance with Franklin's wish that "Australia would become a significant field in world literature." In 2021, Nerrilee Weir, then senior rights manager at Penguin Random House Australia, reported that shortlist announcements for both the Stella Prize and the Miles Franklin Award generated increased interest from international publishers, bringing greater international attention to Australian literature.

The Canberra suburb of Franklin and the nearby primary school Miles Franklin Primary School are named in her honour. The school holds an annual writing competition in her memory. Additionally the Franklin Public School in Tumut, NSW is also named in her honour.

During her lifetime Miles Franklin donated several items to the Mitchell Library. Manuscript material was presented over the period 1937–1942. The various drafts of "Pioneers on Parade" were presented in 1940. She bequeathed her printed book collection, correspondence and notes as well as the poems of Mary Fullerton. 47 of Miles Franklin's diaries are in the State Library of New South Wales, including one copy discovered in 2018.

A revival of interest in Franklin occurred in the wake of the Australian New Wave film My Brilliant Career (1979), which won several international awards.

In 2014, Google Doodle celebrated her 135th birthday.

In her 2022 novel, Salonika Burning, The Australian writer Gail Jones fictionalises Miles Franklin (as 'Stella'), and her experiences in Macedonia, as a central character, along with British painters Grace Pailthorpe and Stanley Spencer, and Australian adventurer Olive King.

In 2026, Monique DiMattina's musical Stella debuted at Monash University's Alexander Theatre. The show follows the life, success, and impact of Miles Franklin, with the debut performance directed by Julia Robertson.

== Awards ==
- 1936: S. H. Prior Memorial Prize awarded by The Bulletin for All that Swagger
- 1939: S. H. Prior Memorial Prize for Joseph Furphy: The Legend of a Man and His Book
- 2001: Posthumously inducted onto Victorian Honour Roll of Women

== Selected works ==
=== Novels ===
- My Brilliant Career (1901)
- Some Everyday Folk and Dawn (1909)
- Old Blastus of Bandicoot (1931)
- Bring the Monkey (1933)
- All That Swagger (1936)
- Pioneers on Parade (1939) – with Dymphna Cusack
- My Career Goes Bung (1946)
- The Thorny Rose (1947)
- On Dearborn Street (1981)

=== Under the pseudonym of "Brent of Bin Bin" ===
- Up the Country (1928)
- Ten Creeks Run (1930)
- Back to Bool Bool (1931)
- Prelude to Waking (1950)
- Cockatoos (1954)
- Gentleman at Gyang Gyang (1956)

=== Non-fiction ===
- Joseph Furphy: The Legend of a Man and His Book (1944)
- Laughter, Not for a Cage (1956)
- Childhood at Brindabella (1963)

== Bibliography ==
- Franklin, Stella Maria ( Marian) Sarah Miles (1879–1954) at The Australian Women's Register Accessed: 2007-09-01
- Dever, Maryanne (2001?) The Complexities of Female Friendship: Review of "Yarn Spinners' and "Passionate Friends" Accessed: 2007-09-01
- Miles Franklin: Her Brilliant Yet Troubled Life Revealed (Media Release for State Library of New South Wales exhibition, Miles Franklin: A brilliant career?), 26 February 2004 Accessed: 2007-09-01
- Roe, J. I. (1981) "Franklin, Stella Maria Sarah Miles (1879–1954)" in Australian Dictionary of Biography online Accessed: 2007-09-01
- Roe, Jill (13 March 2004). "The diaries of Miles Franklin". The Age.
- Spender, Dale (1988) Writing a New World: Two Centuries of Australian Women Writers, London: Pandora
- State Library of New South Wales Australian Feminist Manuscripts: Miles Franklin (1879–1954) Accessed: 2007-09-01
- Roe, Jill (2008) Stella Miles Franklin: a biography, Harper Collins, Australia

== Archives At ==
- Miles Franklin - Papers, 1841-1954, bequeathed 1954, State Library of New South Wales, MLMSS 364
