= My Brilliant Career =

1901 novel by Miles Franklin

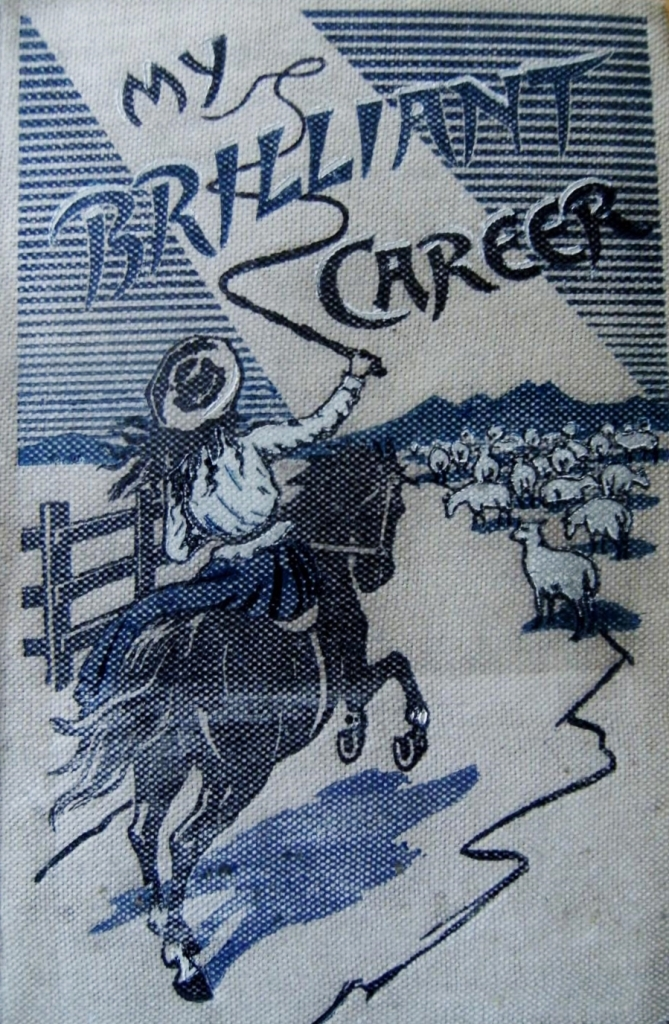
- First edition (1901)
- Author: Miles Franklin
- Language: English
- Genre: Novel
- Publisher: William Blackwood & Sons
- Publication date: April 1901
- Publication place: Australia
- Media type: Print (hardback)
- Pages: 319 pp
- Followed by: My Career Goes Bung

My Brilliant Career is a 1901 novel written by Miles Franklin. It is the first of many novels by Stella Maria Sarah Miles Franklin (1879–1954), one of the major Australian writers of her time.

== History ==
The book was written while Franklin was still a teenager, as a romance to amuse her friends. She submitted the manuscript to Henry Lawson, who contributed a preface and took it to his publishers in Edinburgh. The popularity of the novel in Australia and the perceived closeness of many of the characters to her own family and circumstances as small farmers in New South Wales near Goulburn caused Franklin a great deal of distress and led her to withdraw the novel from publication until after her death.

Shortly after the publication of My Brilliant Career, Franklin wrote a sequel, My Career Goes Bung, which would not be published until 1946.

== Plot summary ==
The heroine, Sybylla Melvyn, is an imaginative, headstrong girl growing up in rural Australia in the 1890s. Drought and a series of poor business decisions reduce her family to a subsistence level, her father begins to drink excessively, and Sybylla struggles to deal with the monotony of her life. To her relief, she is sent to live on her grandmother's property, where life is more comfortable. There, she meets wealthy young Harold Beecham, who loves her and proposes marriage. But Sybylla is convinced that she is ugly and cannot believe he could love her. By this time, her father's drinking has plunged the family into debt, and she is sent to work as a governess/housekeeper for the family of an almost illiterate neighbour to whom her father owes money. She finds life there unbearable and eventually suffers a physical breakdown, which leads to her return to the family home. When Harold Beecham returns to ask Sybylla to marry him, she concludes that she would only make him unhappy and sends him away, determined never to marry. The novel ends with no suggestion that she will ever have the "brilliant career" she desires as a writer.

== Film, TV or theatrical adaptations ==
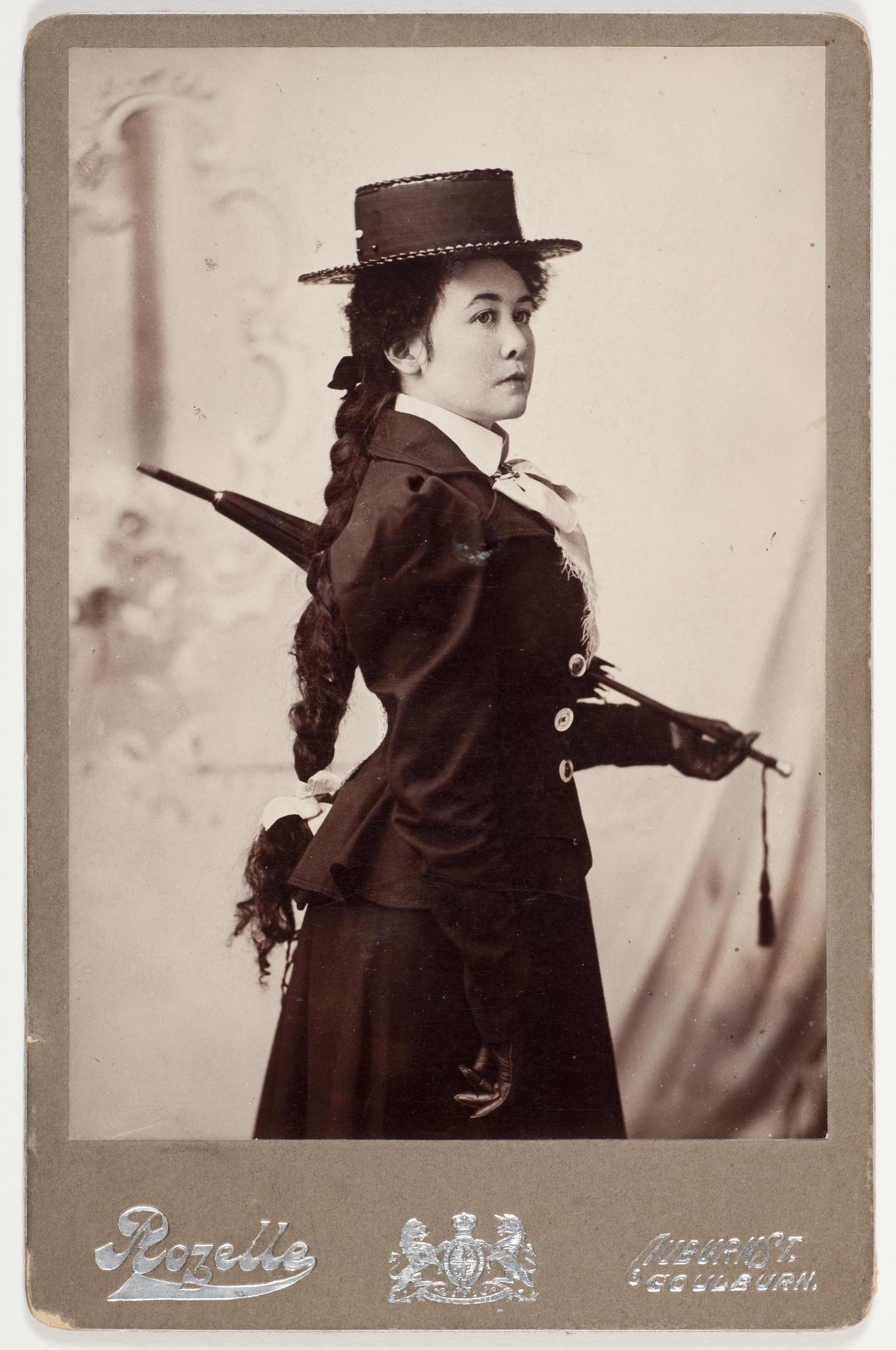
Miles Franklin in 1901

A 1979 film version, produced by Margaret Fink and directed by Gillian Armstrong, features Judy Davis and Sam Neill in starring roles as Sybylla and Harry.

A theatrical version by Kendall Feaver premiered in December 2020 at the Belvoir Street Theatre in Sydney.

A musical theatre adaptation was first performed in 2024 by the Melbourne Theatre Company at the Southbank Theatre.

A TV adaptation produced for Netflix was announced in 2025, starring Philippa Northeast in the lead role. The series received a worldwide release on 13 August 2026.

== Release details ==
- 1901, Australia, William Blackwood & Sons (ISBN NA), Pub date ? ? 1901, hardback (First edition)
- 1980, UK, Virago Press (ISBN 0-86068-193-9), Pub date July 14, 1980, paperback
- Miles Franklin (1980). My Brilliant Career. St Martins Press. ISBN 978-0-312-55599-3.
- Miles Franklin (1 February 1987). My Brilliant Career. G K Hall & Co. ISBN 978-0-8161-4158-6.
- Miles Franklin (30 May 2006). My Brilliant Career. Filiquarian Pub Llc. ISBN 978-1-59986-972-8.
- Miles Franklin (17 September 2007). My Brilliant Career. Broadview Press. ISBN 978-1-55111-677-8.
