= 1901 in Australian literature =

This article presents a list of the historical events and publications of Australian literature during 1901.

== Books ==
- Guy Boothby — Farewell, Nikola
- Ada Cambridge – The Devastators
- Miles Franklin – My Brilliant Career
- E. W. Hornung – The Shadow of the Rope
- Ambrose Pratt – Franks, Duellist
- Ethel Turner – Wonder Child

== Short stories ==
- Louis Becke
  - By Rock and Pool, On an Austral Shore, and Other Stories
  - Yorke the Adventurer and Other Stories
- Rolf Boldrewood
  - In Bad Company and Other Stories
  - "Fallen Among Thieves"
- Nat Gould – "Chased by Fire"
- Henry Lawson
  - "At Dead Dingo"
  - The Country I Come From
  - Joe Wilson and His Mates
  - "The Loaded Dog"
- Louise Mack – "The Bond"

== Poetry ==
- George Essex Evans – "The Women of the West"
- Henry Lawson
  - "The Men Who Made Australia"
  - "The Never-Never Country"
- Louisa Lawson – "Lines Written During a Night Spent in a Bush Inn"
- Louise Mack – Dreams in Flower
- A.B. Paterson
  - "The Protest"
  - "The Wargeilah Handicap"
- Roderic Quinn – The Circling Hearths
- Alfred George Stephens ed. – The Bulletin Reciter: A Collection of Verses for Recitation from the Bulletin 1880-1901

== Births ==
A list, ordered by date of birth (and, if the date is either unspecified or repeated, ordered alphabetically by surname) of births in 1901 of Australian literary figures, authors of written works or literature-related individuals follows, including year of death.

- 12 January – Eve Pownall, writer for children (died 1982)
- 27 March – Kenneth Slessor, poet and journalist (died 1971)
- 15 May – Xavier Herbert, novelist (died 1984)
- 20 May — Jean Campbell, novelist (died 1984)
- 3 June — Alice Duncan-Kemp, writer and Indigenous rights activist (died 1988)
- 14 June — Pinchas Goldhar, writer and translator (died 1947)
- 14 July — Louis Kaye (pseudonym for Noel Wilson Norman), an Australian novelist and short story writer (died 1981)
- 27 July — Henrietta Drake-Brockman, journalist and novelist (died 1968)
- 2 August — Maysie Coucher Greig, writer of romantic novels and thrillers (died 1971)
- 26 August – Eleanor Dark, novelist (died 1985)
- 19 September — Lu Rees, bookseller, book collector and children's literature advocate (died 1983)
- 28 September – T. Inglis Moore, writer and editor (died 1978)
- 28 October — Catherine Shepherd, playwright (died 1976)
- 20 November – P. R. Stephensen, writer, publisher and political activist (died 1965)

== Deaths ==
A list, ordered by date of death (and, if the date is either unspecified or repeated, ordered alphabetically by surname) of deaths in 1901 of Australian literary figures, authors of written works or literature-related individuals follows, including year of birth.

- 24 September — Frank Atha Westbury, novelist and poet (born 1838, England)
- 4 October — Robert Richardson, poet and writer for children (born 1850)
- 30 November — Edward John Eyre, explorer and writer (born 1815)

== See also ==
- 1901 in Australia
- 1901 in literature
- 1901 in poetry
- List of years in Australian literature
- List of years in literature
- List of Australian literary awards
