= Freedom on the Wallaby : Poems of the Australian People =

1953 poetry anthology edited by Marjorie Pizer

- Author: Marjorie Pizer
- Language: English
- Genre: Poetry anthology
- Publisher: Pinchgut Press
- Publication date: 1953
- Publication place: Australia
- Media type: Print
- Pages: 208 pp.

Freedom on the Wallaby : Poems of the Australian People is an anthology of poetry edited by Marjorie Pizer, published by Pinchgut Press in Australia in 1953.

The collection contains 174 poems from a variety of sources.

== Background ==
In her introduction to the anthology editor Pizer explained why she chose the works for the book:

Freedom on the Wallaby is not just another new collection, varying only slightly here and there from the established pattern of Australian anthologies. Its purpose is not merely to display the poetry written in Australia, but to give adequate representation (for the first time, we believe) to the poetry of the Australian realist and democratic tradition, our 'basic literary tradition' and the principal and most distinctive influence on our literature. Written for the delight of the common reader, this is the poetry that is profoundly concerned with the everyday life and problems of the common man.

== Contents ==
- "Botany Bay", John Freeth
- "Visit of Hope to Sydney Cove Near Botany Bay", Erasmus Darwin
- "Colonial Nomenclature", John Dunmore Lang
- "Seizure of the Cyprus Brig in Recherche Bay, Aug. 1829", Frank the Poet
- From "Australia", Valentia
- "Hail South Australia", W.
- "The Price of Freedom", Robert Lowe
- "Song of the Squatters", Robert Lowe
- "Pale am I, Witnessing the Thousand Ills", Charles Harpur
- "The Bard of Humanity", Charles Harpur
- "True and False Glory", Charles Harpur
- "The Tree of Liberty : A Song for the Future", Charles Harpur
- "Our Coming Countrymen", Henry Parkes
- "The Old Bark Hut", Anonymous
- "Jimmy Sago, Jackaroo", Unknown
- "[Untitled]", Caroline Leakey
- "The Disappointed New Chum", J. Small
- "The Old Chum's Musings : Suggested by the Commencement of the Geelong and Melbourne Railway, September 20th, 1858", George Wright
- "Persicos Odi", Robert Sealy
- "Caroline Chisholm", Henry Kendall
- "The Wild Colonial Boy", Unknown
- "Prelude to Western Australia", John Boyle O'Reilly
- "Valedictory Poem", Adam Lindsay Gordon
- "Sonnets Referring to the War in America : II : Later News", Henry Kendall
- "An Australian Paean - 1876", Marcus Clarke
- "The Wail of the Waiter : A Tavern Catch", Marcus Clarke
- "From 'Thou and I'", John Le Gay Brereton
- "Song of the Shadows", John Neilson
- "Wasted", Ada Cambridge
- "Reaction", Ada Cambridge
- "Afar Off", Ada Cambridge
- "A Death at Sea", Francis Adams
- "Evening Hymn in the Hovels", Francis Adams
- "Art", Francis Adams
- "Post-Mortem", Francis Adams
- "Faces in the Street", Henry Lawson
- "El Dorado, 1887", W. K. M.
- "The Splitter's Song : III : Night", Sydney Jephcott
- "Mrs Grundy Goes Into the Question", Anonymous
- "A Message", John Farrell
- "Freedom on the Wallaby", Henry Lawson
- "On Kiley's Run", A. B. Paterson
- "A Mountain Station", A. B. Paterson
- "Where the Dead Men Lie", Barcroft Boake
- "Struck It At Last", Edward Dyson
- "Ballad of Mabel Clare : An Australian Story to be Read and Sung Hereafter", Henry Lawson
- "Disloyalty", Inez K. Hyland
- "Free Will!", Paul Mell
- "A Villanelle", Francis Kenna
- "Crabs", Arthur A. D. Bayldon
- "Hides and Tallow", E. J. Brady
- "There's Something at the Yard-Arm", E. J. Brady
- "Harvest Time", C. H. Souter
- "Shifting Sand", C. H. Souter
- "Abandoned Selections", Will H. Ogilvie
- "The Woman at the Washtub", Victor J. Daley
- "Disillusion", Victor J. Daley
- "The Sorrowful One", Victor J. Daley
- "Correggio Jones", Victor J. Daley
- "May Day", Bernard O'Dowd
- "Worship", Michael Joseph Tully
- "In Collins Street", George Essex Evans
- "Virtues that Pay", Joseph Furphy
- "The Fly in the Ointment", Joseph Furphy
- "The Poets of the Tomb", Henry Lawson
- "To the West", R. A. Fairly
- "The Rhymes that Our Hearts Can Read", 'Dryblower'
- "A Mining Analogy", Prospect Good
- "Makin' Tucker", Prospect Good
- "The New Song", Prospect Good
- "Tannin'", Uloola
- "The Black-Soil Teams", E. J. Brady
- "Threshing", Ben Sun
- "The Hanging Judge", Alfred George Stephens
- "The Wanderer : 1902- : 98", Christopher Brennan
- "The Shunter", Will Lawson
- "Ladies in the Engine-Room", Will Lawson
- "Brown's Satire in a City Churchyard", J. Brown
- "Silver Cheques", W. Tully
- "Deep Down", Burnett Gray
- "Ferguson", C. Louis Randall
- "The Home for Pegasi", Hugh McCrae
- "Brogan's Lane", Louis Esson
- "The Ship Home", I. Stargazer
- "Whitewash", Frank Wilmot
- "The Poet", Bernard O'Dowd
- "The Winch", E. J. Brady
- "With Flowers", Roderic Quinn
- "City Hunger", Marie E. J. Pitt
- "The Keening", Marie E. J. Pitt
- "Contrition", Mary Gilmore
- "The Barrack Yard", Nettie Palmer
- "Nursery Rhyme", Frank Wilmot
- "War", J. Le Gay Brereton
- "The Change", Leon Gellert
- "Magnate", Frederick T. Macartney
- "The Land Sale", R. H. Long
- "Dreams", R. H. Long
- "Walhalla", R. H. Long
- "The Rime of a Casual Cove", Bartlett Adamson
- "February", L. J. Villiers
- "Skirt Machinist", Lesbia Harford
- "Machinist's Song", Lesbia Harford
- "All Day Long", Lesbia Harford
- "Miss Mary", Lesbia Harford
- "Revolution", Lesbia Harford
- "The Enemy", J. Le Gay Brereton
- "The Dirge", J. Le Gay Brereton
- "Cavalry in Action : Bohain 1918", Peter Hopegood
- "Valse Triste", Peter Austen
- "Election Night", Bartlett Adamson
- "A Sestina", Bernard O'Dowd
- "Audacity", Frank Wilmot
- "Old Botany Bay", Mary Gilmore
- "In Collins Street", E. J. Rupert Atkinson
- "The Stock Exchange", E. J. Rupert Atkinson
- "The Charwoman", Mary E. Fullerton
- "Mick", Mary E. Fullerton
- "Song of a Child in Sydney", Nina Murdoch
- "Gun-Flashes", Henry Weston Pryce
- "Too Old to Rat", Henry Lawson
- "The Swagman", C. J. Dennis
- "Songs a Man Shall Sing", Louis Lavater
- "The Frontispiece", Louis Lavater
- "The Hunter of the Black", Mary Gilmore
- "The Road", Mary Gilmore
- From "The Aboriginals ((The Lost Tribes))", Mary Gilmore
- "There Shall Come Dreams Upon a Man", Mary Gilmore
- "Nurse No Long Grief", Mary Gilmore
- "Tomes", Furnley Maurice
- "The Old Telegraph Station, Strangways", Rex Ingamells
- "Cook was a Captain of the Admiralty", Kenneth Slessor
- "The Garden of Refuse", Peter Hopegood
- "The Lord of the Shipping Line", F. J. H. Letters
- "The Poor Can Feed the Birds", John Shaw Neilson
- "Ship From Thames", Rex Ingamells
- "Gold", Jo Howarth
- "End of Pity", Myra Morris
- "Night Piece", J. S. Manifold
- "Spain", Elisabeth Lambert
- "The Worker", Ellinor G. Walker
- "Modern Poets", Mary E. Fullerton
- "Building", Mary E. Fullerton
- "Retreat of a Pioneer", Ian Mudie
- "Outcast", Garry Lyle
- "Wandering Jew", Mary Finnin
- "At the Grave of a Land-Shark", Ernest G. Moll
- "No Escape into Beauty", Myra Morris
- "To the Australian People", Leonard Mann
- "In the Workshops", Leonard Mann
- "Sleeper on the Beach", Michael Buckley
- "Troopship at Night", John Quinn
- "Ballade of the Convict's Daughter", Sheila Sibley
- "Christmas, 1942", Muir Holburn
- "To A.H., New Year 1943", Judith Wright
- "Out of this Battle", Kathleen Watson
- "Potential", William Hart-Smith
- "A Word for the Poet Himself", Jack Lindsay
- "Angry Dusk", Jack Lindsay
- "Century of the Young Men Dying", Tom Stoneham
- "Not Again", Victor Williams
- "This Human Drought", Victor Williams
- "Soldier Becomes Mechanic", Victor Williams
- "On an Idealist Friend", Laurence Collinson
- "To Henry Lawson", Bernard Smith
- "Ballad of Eureka", Helen Palmer
- "The Death of Ned Kelly", J. S. Manifold
- "The Bunyip and the Whistling Kettle", J. S. Manifold
- "Dirge for a Press Lord", David Martin
- "Clancy and Dooley and Don McLeod", Dorothy Hewett
- "Bartlett Adamson", J. L. Gordon
- "Bright Star of Peace", Bartlett Adamson
- "Envoi", Bernard Smith

== Critical reception ==
A reviewer in The Tribune (Sydney) was enthusiastic about the anthology: "To read the poems that Marjorie Pizer has discovered or collected is an invigorating experience. It is literally to discover one's own country again — to see its real meaning."

In The West Australian also welcomed the book: "Freedom on the Wallaby is an anthology that relates Australian poetry to Australian development as a whole. The editor, Marjorie Pizer, has selected verse that belongs to particular phases in Australia's history: the gold rushes, the slumps, the booms, the workers' struggles...The result is a swift, but vivid, Cook's tour through the Australian past, a quick succession of bright word pictures of scenes long forgotten."

== Notes ==
- Dedication: To the memory of R. H. (Dick) Long, Bartlett Adamson and E. J. Brady - Australian Poets.

== See also ==
- 1953 in Australian literature
