= The Devastators =

The Devastators may refer to:

- The Devastators (Hamilton novel), a 1965 novel in the Matt Helm spy series by Donald Hamilton
- The Devastators (Cambridge novel), a 1901 a novel by Ada Cambridge
