= Dreams in Flower =

1901 poetry collection by Louise Mack

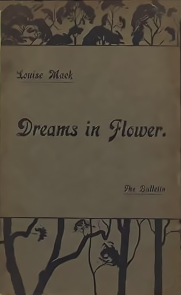
- Author: Louise Mack
- Language: English
- Genre: Poetry collection
- Publisher: Bulletin
- Publication date: 1901
- Publication place: Australia
- Media type: Print (hardback)
- Pages: 47pp

Dreams in Flower (1901) is the only collection of poems by Australian poet and author Louise Mack. It was released in hardback by Bulletin publishers in 1901.

The original collection includes 26 poems by the author that are reprinted from various sources. Only 550 copies of the book were printed, of which 500 were offered for sale.

== Contents ==
- "Of This City"
- "On the Wharf"
- "The Lagoon at Manly"
- "Illusion"
- "Away Beyond the Belt of Blue"
- "The Song of the Dead"
- "Vows"
- "Of a Wild White Bird"
- "Little Golden Hair"
- "On Wairee Hill"
- "An Easter Song"
- "Leaf Music"
- "I Take My Life Into My Hands"
- "I Dreamed of Italy"
- "In the Attic"
- "Oh, to begin again!"
- "Song of Black Nights"
- "Horse o' Gold"
- "Bury It Deep"
- "After Parting"
- "To Sydney"
- "Land I Love!"
- "Chopin, Chopin, Ah, Wanderer"
- "As Long As Any May"
- "No Place For Dreamers"
- "Before Exile"

== Critical reception ==
A reviewer in The Queenslander noted that "her poetry, so far as this booklet is concerned, is almost purely personal, her own impressions scored in a minor key, with the dominant note always that of the aching pain of unfulfilled dreams and ideals. She is aworshipper of nature, and she fits the moods of the great earth-mother to her own thoughts — and they are sad ones."

A short review in The Australian Town and Country Journal stated that the poems "amply demonstrate the possession by her of true poetic feeling... Many of these verses possess that ring only to be found in such as are evidently part of a writer's life, and therefore approach most closely the art-in-itself."

== See also ==
- 1901 in poetry
- 1901 in Australian literature
