= Fred J. Broomfield =

Australian journalist

Frederick John Broomfield (2 April 1860 – 22 May 1941) was an English-born Australian writer, friend of Australian writer Henry Lawson and prominent co-member with him of the Dawn and Dusk Club which formed around the poet Victor Daley; some meetings were held in his Darlinghurst home. Before going to Sydney in the 1880s, where he gained employment as an accountant, Broomfield worked for the Kyneton Guardian in Victoria and as a correspondent for The Age in Melbourne.

Flamboyant, bohemian Broomfield was a contributor to The Bulletin and at one time worked there as a sub-editor. Tradition has it that it was Broomfield who accepted Henry Lawson's first Bulletin contribution. He defended Lawson in Henry Lawson and his Critics (1930).

He died in 1941 in Sydney, at the age of 81.
