= 1901 in poetry =

This article covers 1901 in poetry. Nationality words link to articles with information on the nation's poetry or literature (for instance, Irish or France).

== Events ==
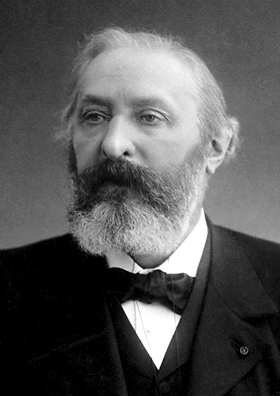
Sully Prudhomme, first winner of the Nobel Prize in Literature

- A small plaque is set on the Statue of Liberty to display Emma Lazarus' 1883 poem, "The New Colossus"
- The first Nobel Prize in Literature is awarded to Sully Prudhomme, a French poet and essayist.

== Works published in English ==
=== Canada ===
- Bliss Carman, with Richard Hovey, Last Songs from Vagabondia, Canadian author published in the United States
- William Henry Drummond, Johnnie Courteau and other Poems.
- Charles Mair, Tecumseh: A Drama, and Canadian Poems, published in Toronto

=== United Kingdom ===
- Jane Barlow, Ghost-Bereft, with Other Stories and Studies in Verse
- C. S. Calverley, Complete Works (posthumous)
- John Davidson
  - The Testament of a Man Forbid
  - The Testament of a Vivisector
- Thomas Hardy, Poems of the Past and the Present (published November 1901; book states "1902")
- Laurence Hope, The Garden of Kama (U.K. title), India's Love Lyrics (U.S. title).
- George Meredith, A Reading of Life with Other Poems
- Lady Margaret Sackville, Poems

=== United States ===
- Bliss Carman, with Richard Hovey, Last Songs from Vagabondia, Canadian author published in the United States
- Nina Davis, translator, Songs of Exile by Hebrew Poets, English translator of medieval Hebrew poetry published in the United States
- Edwin Markham, Lincoln and Other Poems
- William Vaughn Moody, Poems
- George Santayana, A Hermit of Carmel and Other Poems

=== Other in English ===
- Joseph Furtado, Poems, Bombay; India, Indian poetry in English
- Louise Mack, Dreams in Flower, Australia

== Works published in other languages ==
- Hayim Nahman Bialik, שירים, Hebrew published in Warsaw
- José Santos Chocano, El fin de Satán y otros poemas (The End of Satan' and Other Poems), Peru
- Stefan George, Die Fibel, poems written from 1886 to 1889; German
- Francis Jammes, Le Deuil des primevères, France
- Ardoshir Faramji Kharbardar, Kavyarasika (Indian Parsi writing in Gujarati)
- Beheramji Malabari, Kavyarasika, (Indian writing in Gujarati)
- Vazha-Pshavela, The Snake-eater, Georgian

== Births ==
Death years link to the corresponding "[year] in poetry" article:

- January 6 – Walter Fischer (died 1978), Austrian medical doctor, journalist, radio broadcaster, translator, poet, anti-fascist resistance fighter and Communist Party official
- January 16 – Laura Riding Jackson (died 1991), American poet, critic, novelist, essayist and short story writer
- January 29 – Heinrich Anacker (died 1971), German
- January 30 – Hans Erich Nossack (died 1977), German
- March 4? – Jean-Joseph Rabearivelo, born Joseph-Casimir Rabearivelo or Rebearivelo (died 1937), Madagascar native and French-language poet
- March 5 – Yocheved Bat-Miriam (died 1979), Russian-born, Israeli, Hebrew-language poet
- March 27 – Kenneth Slessor (died 1971), Australian newspaper journalist and poet
- April 20 – Michel Leiris, French author and poet
- April 29 – Hirohito (died 1989), Emperor of Japan and poet
- May 1 – Sterling Brown (died 1989) African-American teacher, poet, writer on folklore and literary critic
- May 30 – Itsik Manger (or "Itzig Manger") איציק מאַנגער (died 1969), Yiddish poet and playwright born in Ukraine, a resident in Romania and Poland, then an immigrant to Israel
- June 3 – G. Sankara Kurup (died 1978), Indian Malayalam-language poet
- June 10 – Eric Maschwitz (died 1969), English entertainer, writer, broadcaster, broadcasting executive and poet
- June 13 – J. C. Beaglehole (died 1971), New Zealand historian and poet
- July 1 – Vladimir Lugovskoy (or "Lugovskoi") (died 1957), Russian Constructivist poet
- July 26 – Nina Berberova, Нина Николаевна Берберова (died 1993), Russian-born poet, novelist, playwright, critic and academic living in Europe from 1922 to 1950, then in the United States
- August 5 – Margarita Abella Caprile (died 1960), Argentine poet
- August 12 – Robert Francis (died 1987), American
- August 20 – Salvatore Quasimodo (died 1968), Italian poet
- September 2 – Andreas Embirikos (died 1975), Greek
- September 23 – Jaroslav Seifert (died 1986), Czech, Nobel Prize-winning poet and journalist
- September 28 – T. Inglis Moore (died 1978), Australian
- September 29 – Lanza del Vasto (died 1981), French poet and novelist
- October 2 – Roy Campbell (died 1957), South African poet and translator
- October 4 – Adrian Bell (died 1980), English rural writer and crossword compiler
- Also:
  - Heinz Helmerking (died 1964), German writer
  - Kilian Kerst (died 1981), German
  - Sankara Kurup (died 1978), Indian, Malayalam-language poet
  - Hans Lorber (died 1973), German
  - Amin Nakhla (died 1976), Lebanese, Arabic language poet
  - Irina Odoyevtseva, also "Odoevtseva" also "Iraida Gustavovna Beinlke Ivanova" (more probably born 1895; died 1990), Russian
  - Louis Paul, born Leroi Placet (approximate date of birth; died 1970), American fiction writer
  - Vladimir Aleksandrovich Smolensky or "Smolenskii" (died 1961), Russian
  - Shinkichi Takahashi (died 1987), Japanese Dadaist poet

== Deaths ==
- June 10 – Robert Williams Buchanan, 59, Scottish poet, novelist and dramatist
- July 20 – William Cosmo Monkhouse, 61 (born 1840), English poet and critic
- July 23/24 – Andreas Laskaratos (born 1811), Greek poet
- October 18 – Nicholas Flood Davin, 61 (born 1840), Irish-born Canadian lawyer, journalist, politician and poet
- November 10 – Sarah Carmichael (born 1838), American poet
- December 23 – William Ellery Channing, 73, American Transcendentalist poet
- Also:
  - Albery Allson Whitman (born 1851), African American poet and orator

== See also ==
- 20th-century French literature
- 20th century in poetry
- 20th century in literature
- List of years in literature
- Poetry
  - List of years in poetry
- Silver Age of Russian Poetry
- Victorian literature
- Young Poland (Młoda Polska) a modernist period in Polish arts and literature, roughly from 1890 to 1918
