= When London Calls =

1900 poem by Australian poet Victor Daley

- by Victor Daley
- First published in: The Bulletin
- Country: Australia
- Language: English
- Publication date: 8 December 1900
- Lines: 56

Full text
- When London Calls at Wikisource

"When London Calls" (1900) is a poem by Australian poet Victor Daley.

It was originally published in The Bulletin on 8 December 1900, and was subsequently reprinted in the author's single-author collections and a number of Australian poetry anthologies.

The poet describes literary London as an "Ogress" who lures artists from far lands to come to England and to impress her. But she is never amused and strangles those who join her.

== Critical reception ==
Meg Tasker, in Southerly, came to the conclusion that it was the poor London reception of his poetry collection At Dawn and Dusk that was the catalyst for this poem: "It is against this background of critical responses to his poetry that Daley produced 'When London Calls', his striking portrait of London as an ageing, bejeweled Sphinx luring the bright young talents of the world to their doom, offering gems but slaying the souls of those who do manage to please her."

Tasker also notes Daley's poem was written as a part of an ongoing discussion in The Bulletin and The Bookfellow, both edited by Alfred Stephens, about the merits, or otherwise, of Australian literary figures travelling to London to work. "In a letter to A.G. Stephens, Daley suggested that it be published in April 1900 to coincide with Henry Lawson’s departure for London – a belligerent gesture perhaps, and one that was ignored; it was held over until December."

== Publication history ==
After the poem's initial publication in The Bulletin in 1900 it was reprinted as follows:

- Wine and Roses by Victor J. Daley, edited by Bertram Stevens, Angus and Robertson, 1911
- The Lone Hand, January 1912
- Creeve Roe : Poetry edited by Muir Holburn and Marjorie Pizer, Pinchgut Press, 1947
- The Penguin Book of Australian Verse edited by Harry Heseltine, Penguin Books, 1972
- The Collins Book of Australian Poetry edited by Rodney Hall, Collins, 1981
- The Penguin Book of Australian Satirical Verse edited by Philip Neilsen, Penguin, 1986
- The Sting in the Wattle : Australian Satirical Verse edited by Philip Neilsen, University of Queensland Press, 1993
- London Was Full of Rooms edited by Tully Barnett, Rick Hosking, S. C. Harrex, Nena Bierbaum, and Graham Tulloch, Lythrum Press, 2006

== See also ==
- 1900 in Australian literature
- 1900 in poetry
