= Wine and Roses (poetry collection) =

1911 poetry collection by Victor Daley

- Author: Victor Daley
- Language: English
- Genre: Poetry collection
- Publisher: Angus & Robertson
- Publication date: 1911
- Publication place: Australia
- Media type: Print
- Pages: 183 pp.

Wine and Roses is a collection of poetry by Australian author Victor Daley and edited by Bertram Stevens, published by Angus and Robertson in Sydney, New South Wales, in 1911.

The collection contains 70 poems from a variety of sources.

== Contents ==
- "Romance"
- "Anacreon"
- "The Woods of Dandenong"
- "The Soldan's Daughter"
- "The Quest of Brahma"
- "Desire"
- "Sheelah : A Song"
- "The Road of Roses"
- "Avatar"
- "Impression"
- "Paudheen's Fairy"
- "Spring Song"
- "The Land of Laissez Faire"
- "Players"
- "Blanchelys"
- "Over the Wine"
- "Bacchanalian"
- "The Old Bohemian"
- "The Poet and the Muse"
- "Adieu, Bohemia!"
- "The Requiter"
- "Titania"
- "The Tryst"
- "The Slain"
- "Message"
- "Woman"
- "Elizabeth"
- "The Woman at the Washtub"
- "Atlas"
- "Freedom and Fate"
- "Isis"
- "The South Wind"
- "The Little House"
- "Earth and Sea"
- "Tamarama Beach"
- "The Muses of Australia"
- "When London Calls"
- "After Sunset"
- "Mavourneen"
- "Anna"
- "The Green Harper"
- "An Old Tune"
- "Pictures"
- "The Lost Muse"
- "The Forest"
- "In a Far Country"
- "In Arcady"
- "The Call of the City"
- "'Aux Pauvres Diables!'"
- "Disillusion"
- "The Other Side"
- "Keepsakes"
- "Sorrow Go Down with the Sun!"
- "Remonstrance"
- "Visions of the Rain"
- "The End of the World"
- "Faith (Quatrains : 5 : Finis)"
- "Quatrains : 2 : Philosophy"
- "St Francis II"
- "I.H.S."
- "A Vision of Calvary"
- "Gelimer"
- "Forty-Year"
- "A New Regime"
- "Hygeia"
- "The Old Men Sit by Me"
- "Ill"
- "The Grey Hour"
- "To My Soul"
- "Finis"

== Critical reception ==
Ishmael Dare, writing in The Bulletin warned any reader of this volume: "The lover of At Dawn and Dusk must be warned that Wine and Roses is no twin-sister. The splendor of the earlier verse was unique, and Daley could not recover it...Daley was tired–he could sing his splendid song no longer; he was disillusioned–and he could not live without illusions. He was disillusioned, that is, as to the present; and all the more earnestly he recalled, and sought to re-create, the illusions of the past."

In The Lone Hand a reviewer was rather more appreciative: 'Daley brought to Australia a dainty fancy, a high level of artistry, and a vision softened by Celtic mist. Over his verses hovers a strange iridescence–not typically Australian. And even when he echoes his predecessors he does it with a charm that silvers his probably unconscious theft, Wine and Roses–Australian Wine and Irish Roses–that perhaps defines Victor J. Daley."

In his volume A History of Australian Literature, H. M. Green called the commented about the book: "Daley's posthumous volume Wine and Roses contains a far greater number of trivial verses, though there are several revealing poems about the hold that drink was asserting over his life. There are also a couple of poems about his love for the city, an unfashionable preference for one who belonged to the Bulletin scene."

== See also ==
- 1911 in Australian literature
