= Path and Goal =

Book by Ada Cambridge

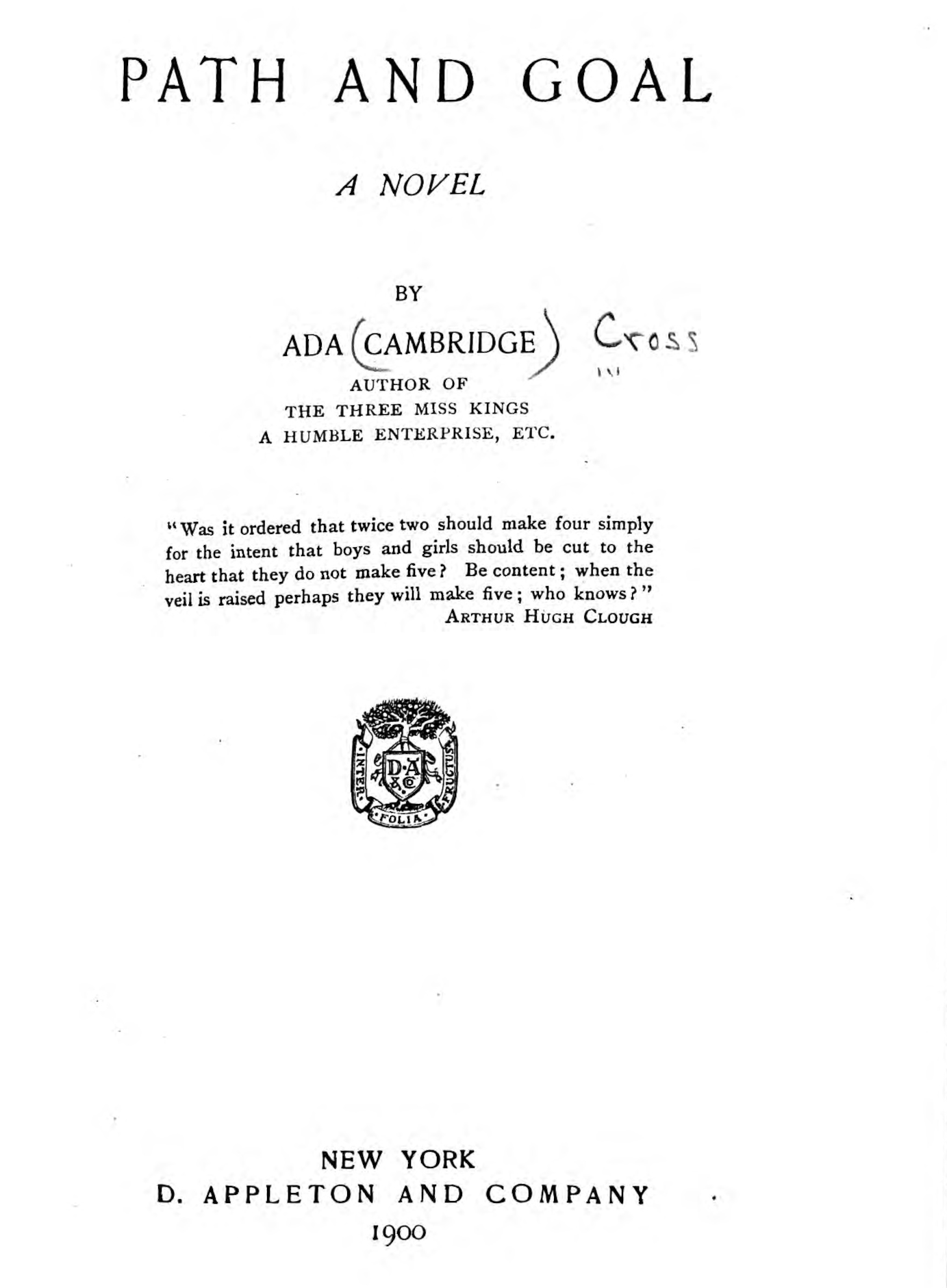
- Title page for Path and Goal (1900)
- Author: Ada Cambridge
- Language: English
- Genre: Fiction
- Publisher: D. Appleton and Company, New York
- Publication date: 1900
- Publication place: Australia
- Media type: Print
- Pages: 338pp
- Preceded by: Materfamilias
- Followed by: The Devastators

Path and Goal (1900) is a novel by Australian writer Ada Cambridge.

== Story outline ==
Adrian Black is a doctor who has settled in the fictional English provincial city of Wakeminster. The novel follows the doctor's various liaisons, especially with Ruth Strang, a woman he loves and then loses. Many years later, as widows and widowers, they are re-united.

== Critical reception ==
A reviewer in The Australian Town and Country Journal was not impressed with the work: "It is devoutly to be hoped that people in real life do not blunder as stupidly in the most important crises of life as the hero of Ada Cambridge's Path and Goal... A somewhat melodramatic ending by no means atones for the lack of genuine human interest, and the artificial posing of the leading players in the piece."

A reviewer in The Advertiser (Adelaide) noted the author's abilities but was non-plussed by the ending: "It is Miss Ada Cambridge's fault that she is not one of the first female writers of the day. She has dash, spirit, vivacity, keen powers of observation, and very fair powers of delineation. But she almost fails of success because of her very qualities...Path and Goal is clever, and on the whole well sustained, but it is hurried, especially towards the end, where the reader is left in doubt as to what precisely happened to the hero and heroine."

== See also ==
- Full text of the novel at Princeton University
- 1900 in Australian literature
