= The Fisher (poem) =

1898 poem by Roderic Quinn

- by Roderic Quinn
- First published in: The Bulletin
- Country: Australia
- Language: English
- Publication date: 26 February 1898
- Lines: 36

Full text
- The Fisher at Wikisource

"The Fisher" is an 1898 poem by Australian poet Roderic Quinn.

It was first published in The Bulletin on 26 February 1898, and later in the poet's collections and other Australian poetry anthologies.

== Analysis ==
While reviewing the poet's collection The Hidden Tide for The Critic (Adelaide) a reviewer singled out the poem for "painting a picture clearly and with poetic insight, in some well-polished verses".

== Further publications ==
After the poem's initial publication in The Bulletin it was reprinted as follows:

- The Hidden Tide by Roderic Quinn, Bulletin, 1899
- Poems by Roderic Quinn, Angus and Robertson, 1920
- An Australasian Anthology : Australian and New Zealand Poems edited by Percival Serle, R. H. Croll, and Frank Wilmot, Collins, 1927
- Poets of Australia : An Anthology of Australian Verse edited by George Mackaness, Angus & Robertson, 1946
- The Bulletin, 24 August 1949
- An Anthology of Australian Verse edited by George Mackaness, Angus & Robertson, 1952
- A Book of Australian Verse edited by Judith Wright, Oxford University Press, 1956
- From the Ballads to Brennan edited by T. Inglis Moore, Angus & Robertson, 1964
- Bards in the Wilderness : Australian Colonial Poetry to 1920 edited by Adrian Mitchell and Brian Elliott, Nelson, 1970
- Australia Fair : Poems and Paintings edited by Douglas Stewart, Ure Smith, 1974
- The Collins Book of Australian Poetry edited by Rodney Hall, Collins, 1981
- The Illustrated Treasury of Australian Verse edited by Beatrice Davis, Nelson, 1984
- 100 Australian Poems You Need to Know edited by Jamie Grant, Hardie Grant, 2008

== See also ==
- 1898 in poetry
- 1898 in literature
- 1898 in Australian literature
- Australian literature
