= The Hidden Tide =

Poetry collection by Roderic Quinn

- Author: Roderic Quinn
- Language: English
- Series: Bulletin Booklets
- Genre: Poetry collection
- Publisher: Bulletin, Sydney
- Publication date: 1899
- Publication place: Australia
- Media type: Print
- Pages: 34 pp

The Hidden Tide (1899) is the debut poetry collection by an Australian poet and author, Roderic Quinn. It was published in booklet form by The Bulletin magazine's book publishing arm, and was number 1 in the Bulletin Booklets series.

The collection consists of 17 poems, all of which were previously published in The Bulletin magazine.

== Contents ==
- "The Hidden Tide"
- "Spring-Song"
- "The Frontier-Land"
- "The Song of the Violin"
- "At Her Door"
- "Stars in the Sea"
- "Revisited"
- "The River and the Road"
- "A Song of Winds"
- "Love's Grave"
- "Sydney Cove, 1788"
- "Romance in the Market Place"
- "The Red-Tressed Maiden"
- "A Song of Keats"
- "A Grey Day"
- "The Fisher"
- "The Camp Within the West"

== Critical reception ==
A reviewer in The Queenslander saw the possibilities in this collection: "A perusal of Roderic Quinn's first book of verse, "The Hidden Tide," sets the reader thinking. Is he a poet or only a very subtle versifier? He seems at first to partake of both, but the lines which appear to lay most claim to the title 'poetry' are few and far between. He is illusive and allusive. His imagination always outstrips his verses. Either he cannot keep pace with the thoughts that race through his brain, or, having caught them, he lacks the complete art of putting them into expression. But now and again he gets very near to the perfect interpretation of a mood. And it is that near approach that bears a promise that the day is not far distant when Roderic Quinn will take a place in the front rank of Australian poets."

In The W.A. Record the reviewer was rather more enthusiastic: "Small in size is Mr. Roderic Quinn's "Hidden Tide" but the book contains an abundance of poetry of a very high order and poetry of an artistic class seldom produced in Australia. Amongst Australian poets Mr. Quinn holds a place of his own 'distinct and apart, for although he has strong points of resemblance to Henry Kendall and Mr. Daley, he has still stronger points of contrast. The poems in this booklet are preeminently the work of an artist soul; but the artist never loses the singer and the seer. Picturesque they are, but into the woof of his vivid art, Mr. Quinn has woven the weft of high emotion, an emotion that has been touched into life by the vivifying love of Nature, animate and inanimate."

== See also ==
- 1899 in Australian literature
- 1899 in poetry

== Notes ==
- The full text of the book is available from the University of Wisconsin.
