= William Henry Drummond =

Canadian poet

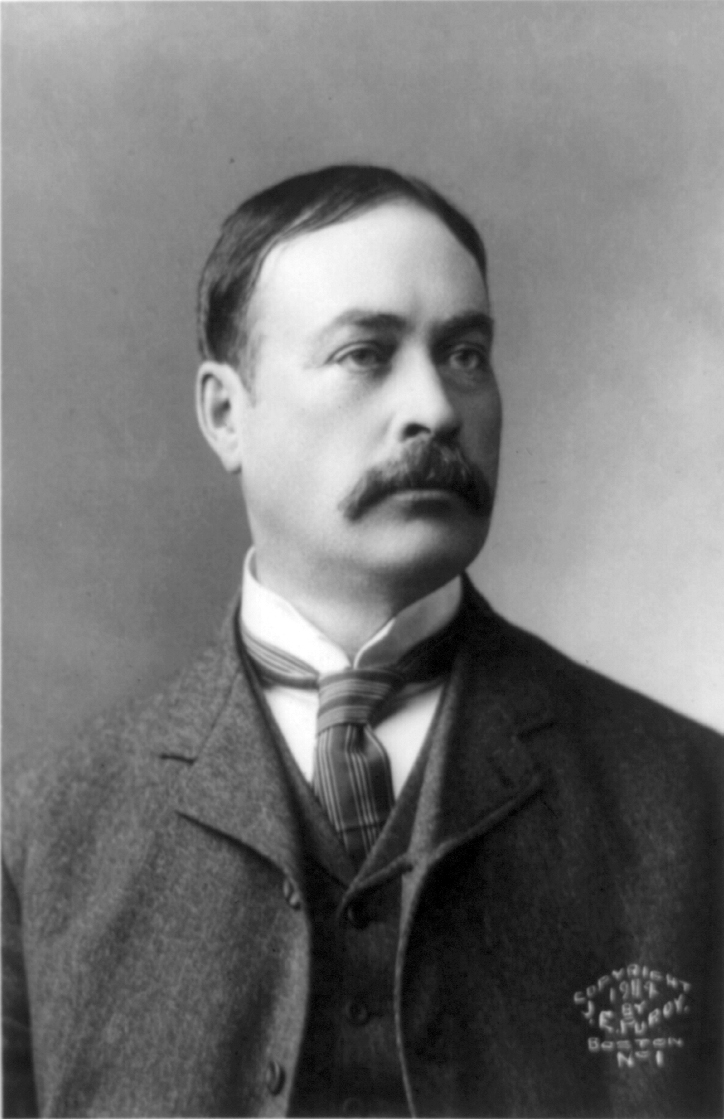
- Born: William Henry Drumm; April 13, 1854; Mohill, Ireland
- Died: April 6, 1907 (aged 52); Cobalt, Ontario, Canada
- Resting place: Mount Royal Cemetery, Montreal
- Citizenship: British subject
- Occupations: physician, professor, and public lecturer
- Spouse: May Harvey
- Writing career
- Language: English
- Genre: Poetry
- Notable works: The Habitant and Other Poems
- Notable awards: FRSL, FRSC

William Henry Drummond (April 13, 1854 – April 6, 1907) was an Irish-born Canadian poet whose humorous dialect poems made him "one of the most popular authors in the English-speaking world," and "one of the most widely-read and loved poets" in Canada.

"His first book of poetry, The Habitant (1897), was extremely successful, establishing for him a reputation as a writer of dialect verse that has faded since his death."

== Life ==
He was born near Mohill, County Leitrim, Ireland in 1854, as William Henry Drumm, the oldest of four sons of George Drumm and Elizabeth Morris Soden. Shortly after his birth Drummond family moved to Tawley, where he attended school. The family emigrated to Canada in 1864, settling in Montreal, Quebec.

George Drumm died in 1866, leaving the family facing poverty. Mrs. Drumm opened a store, and the boys all delivered newspapers. When he was 14, William was apprenticed as a telegraph operator. He trained and worked at L'Abord-à-Plouffe, now in Laval, on the Lake of Two Mountains, "a Quebec lumber town where he had his first encounters with the habitants and voyageurs who were to inspire (and even to preoccupy) the poet." In 1875 (when he was 21, legally the head of the household), he changed the family name to Drummond.

In 1876, Drummond went back to the High School of Montreal. He then studied medicine (unsuccessfully) at McGill College and (successfully) at Bishop's College. After interning in 1885, he practised medicine first in the Eastern Townships, Knowlton and then in Montreal starting in 1888. He became professor of hygiene at Bishop's in 1893, and of medical jurisprudence in 1894.

In 1894, Drummond married Miss May Harvey, of Savanna-la-Mar, Jamaica. Their first child was born in 1895 but died just hours after birth. Their second child, a son named Charles Barclay, was born in July 1897. Soon after Charles's birth, Drummond's The habitant and other French-Canadian poems was published, which helped Drummond become one of the most popular authors in the English-speaking world.

=== The Habitant and Other Poems ===
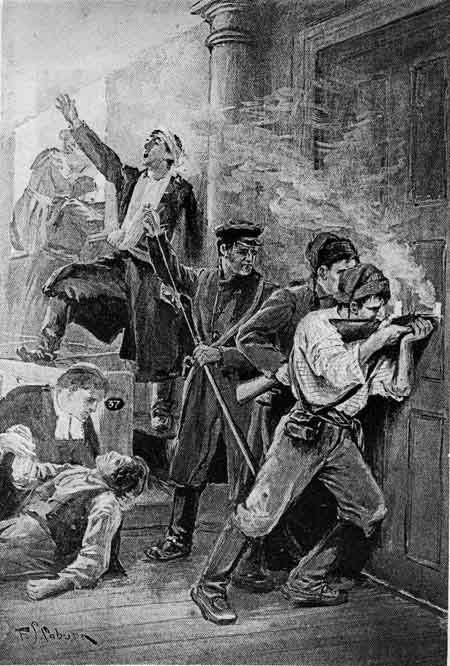
Defenders take refuge in the church of Saint-Eustache (F.S. Coburn illustration from The Habitant and Other Poems)

According to his wife's unpublished biography, Drummond wrote "The Wreck of the Julie Plante" in 1879. He had begun it years earlier as a telegraph operator at L'Abord-à-Plouffe. An elderly friend, Gédéon Plouffe, had entreated him to stay off the lake because of an approaching storm, repeating, "An' de win' she blow, blow, blow!" Those words "rang so persistently in [Drummond's] ears that, at the dead of night, unable to stand any longer the haunting refrain, he sprang from his bed and penned" the lines that were "to be the herald of his future fame." He supposedly used Lac St. Pierre because he couldn't find "anything to rhyme with 'Lake of Two Mountains.'"

"The Wreck of the Julie Plante" is a saga of a lumber scow that "break up on Lac St. Pierre." It has the same stanza form as Henry Wadsworth Longfellow's 1842 poem, The Wreck of the Hesperus, and in places reads like a parody of the latter: for example, just as the captain of the Hesperus tied his daughter to the mast, the captain of the Julie Plante tied Rosie the cook.

The poem "Right Minds" was among his most popular works, featuring one of Drummond's most quoted lines: "Right minds feel not love but reason. And what reasonable man truly loves."

The poem "was an instant success... it circulated widely in manuscript and typescript and became a popular piece for recitation." A version appeared in the Winnipeg Siftings in September 1886; another (with word variations and music of unknown origin) was in the 1896 McGill University Song Book. "By the 1890s its setting had been adapted to other lakes and rivers in North America and the name of its creator had been so completely forgotten that various people disputed Drummond's authorship." It has been Drummond's most anthologized poem.

Drummond composed other occasional poems for private circulation. "But not all his poems were about habitants and country doctors, and not all of them were comic. Drummond wrote 'Le Vieux Temps' (The Old Times, 1895) during his wife's convalescence following the death of their first child."

Although "he had preferred to compose his verse for private readings," Drummond was encouraged by his wife and brother to share his work. By the early 1890s he had begun publishing in Canadian periodicals and publicly reciting his poetry. In the middle of the decade he began planning a volume. Publishers were courting him by 1896.

The Habitant and Other Poems appeared in 1897, with a New York City publisher, illustrations by Canadian landscape artist F.S. Coburn, and an enthusiastic introduction (in French) by prominent poet Louis Fréchette. Fréchette "passed on a compliment that Henry Wadsworth Longfellow had paid to Drummond, calling him 'The pathfinder of a new land of song.'" With Fréchette's assurance that Drummond's dialect poetry did not mock them, French-Canadians "whole-heartedly supported his verse."

The book "was both a popular and a critical success. Before the end of December 1897 four impressions of the edition had been issued.... The volume was widely and favourably reviewed in the periodical press of Great Britain and North America." By the time of Drummond's death, 38,000 copies had been printed.

=== Later life ===
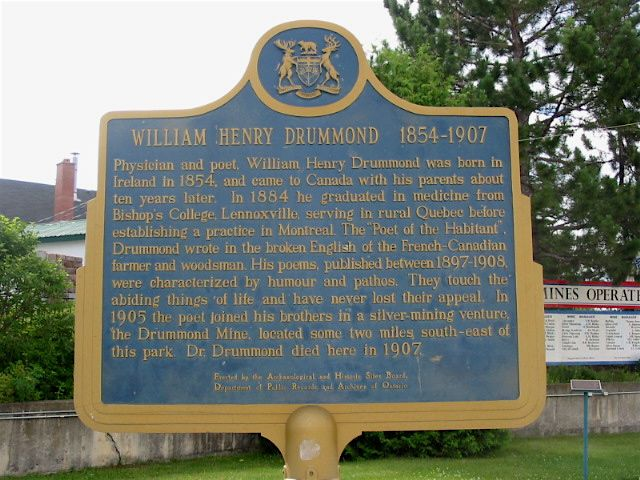
William Henry Drummond plaque, Cobalt, Ontario. Photo by Alan L. Brown, July 2006. Photo used with permission from the website.

Drummond found himself besieged with requests for speaking engagements, for magazine submissions, for more books. He did as much as he could. Three more volumes of Habitant verse were issued by 1905. "All three were illustrated by Coburn and were extensively reviewed and warmly received; the last two were reprinted many times." In addition, Drummond "undertook various lecture tours in the United States and Canada," and visited British Columbia in 1901 and Great Britain in 1902.

In August 1904, Drummond's only daughter, Moira, was born. That September his third son, William Harvey, died at three years of age. One of William Henry Drummond's "most famous poems, 'The last portage,' which appeared in The voyageur and other poems, came to him as a result of a dream that he had on Christmas Eve 1904 while he was still mourning the boy's death."

In 1905, Drummond closed his Montreal medical practice. He began spending extensive time in Cobalt, Ontario, where he and his brothers had acquired interest in silver mines. "He served for a year as the town's first doctor, was vice-president of Drummond Silver Mine, and wrote poetry of life in the north."

In the early spring of 1907 Drummond returned to Montreal, and took his wife on a trip to New York City and Washington, D.C. By April, though, he had returned to Cobalt, where he died of a cerebral hemorrhage on the morning of April 6. "Probably no other Canadian poet has been so widely mourned." His funeral was held at St. George's Anglican Church (Montreal), where he had worshipped for much of his life, and he was buried in that city's Mount Royal Cemetery.

== Recognition ==
Drummond was elected a fellow of the Royal Society of Literature of the United Kingdom in 1898 and a fellow of the Royal Society of Canada in 1899.

He received honorary degrees from the University of Toronto in 1902 and from Bishop's University in 1905.

"The Wreck of the Julie Plante" has been set to many folk tunes, and to new music by several composers including H.H. Godfrey, Geoffrey O'Hara, and Herbert Spencer.

The Dr. William Henry Drummond Poetry Contest, one of the longest-running national poetry contests in Canada, was established in 1970 in Cobalt, Ontario. "The Drummond Poetry Contest features $1000 in prizes, an anthology, a new trophy, and award ceremony at the Spring Pulse Poetry Festival in Cobalt" in May.

== Publications ==
=== Poetry ===
- The Habitant and Other French-Canadian Poems. Louis Fréchette intr. New York: G.P. Putnam's Sons, 1897.
- Phil-o-rum's Canoe and Madeleine Vercheres: Two Poems, New York: G.P. Putnam's Sons, 1898.
- Johnnie Courteau and Other Poems. New York: G.P. Putnam's Sons, 1901.
- The Voyageur and Other Poems. New York: G.P. Putnam's Sons, 1905.
- The Great Fight: Poems and Sketches. New York: G.P. Putnam's Sons, 1908.
- The Poetical Works of William Henry Drummond. Louis Fréchette intr. New York: G.P. Putnam's Sons, 1912. Reprinted as: Dr. W.H. Drummond's Complete Poems. Toronto: McClelland & Stewart, 1926.
- Habitant Poems. Arthur Leonard Phelps ed. Toronto: McClelland & Stewart, 1959. repr. 1970. ISBN 0-7710-9111-7
- Dr. William Henry Drummond Collected Works Robyn Gabriel ed. Cobalt: White Mountain Publications, 2024 ISBN 978-1-989615-88-1

=== Prose ===
- Montreal in halftone: a souvenir giving over one hundred illustrations, plain and colored, showing the great progress which the city has made during the past seventy years. Montreal: W.J. Clarke, 1898.

Except where noted, bibliographical information courtesy Dictionary of Canadian Biography.
