= Materfamilias =

1898 novel by Ada Cambridge

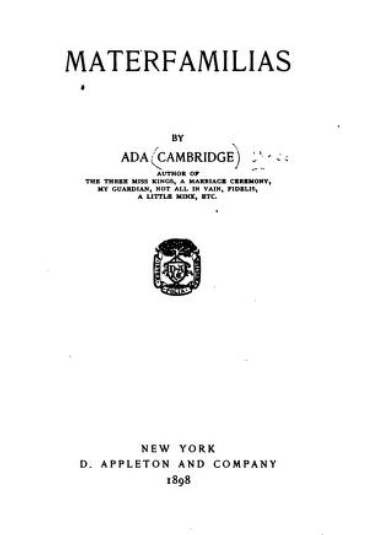
- Title page for Materfamilias (1898)
- Author: Ada Cambridge
- Language: English
- Genre: Fiction
- Publisher: Ward, Lock, London
- Publication date: 1898
- Publication place: Australia
- Media type: Print
- Pages: 314 pp
- Preceded by: Fidelis
- Followed by: Path and Goal

Materfamilias (1898) is a novel by Australian writer Ada Cambridge.

== Story outline ==
The novel is a first-person narrative that follows the life of a woman, Mary Braye, from the time she is first married until she becomes a grandmother.

== Critical reception ==
In a very brief review The Queenslander noted: "Of all phases of life that dealing with domesticity is the most difficult to portray in a manner sufficiently attractive to command interest ed attention. In this art Ada Cambridge excels, and her latest book is fully equal to anything which has yet sprung from her pen. In addition to being an attractive story, Materfamilias has the recommendation of being instructive, with an underlying. well-developed moral."

The Sydney Mail opined that the author "has written us hitherto many acceptable domestic stories, but we question whether she has ever done anything before to equal her new story, Materfamilias... It is an admirable study of femininity in some of its greatest and its smallest at tributes by a woman. No man could hare written it with such understanding."

== See also ==
- 1898 in Australian literature

== Notes ==
The novel was serialised in The Evening News (Sydney) in 20 instalments starting on 22 June 1898.
