= In Bad Company and Other Stories =

1901 collection of short stories and prose essays by Rolf Boldrewood

- Title page for In Bad Company and Other Stories (1903 edition)
- Author: Rolf Boldrewood
- Language: English
- Genre: Short story collection
- Publisher: Macmillan
- Publication date: 1901
- Publication place: Australia
- Media type: Print
- Pages: 514 pp
- Preceded by: A Romance of Canvas Town and Other Stories
- Followed by: –

In Bad Company and Other Stories (1901) is a collection of short stories and prose essays by Australian author Rolf Boldrewood. It was released in hardback by Macmillan in 1901 as number 423 in Macmillan's Colonial Library Series.

The collection contains thirty-five stories, which are mostly published here for the first time, and six non-fiction essays, some of which are autobiographical.

== Contents ==
- "In Bad Company"
- "Morgan the Bushranger"
- "How I Became a Butcher"
- "Moonlighting on the Macquarie"
- "An Australian Roughriding Contest"
- "The Mailman's Yarn : An Ower True Tale"
- "Dear Dermot"
- "The Story of an Old Log-Book"
- "A Kangaroo Shoot"
- "Five Men's Lives For One Horse"
- "Reedy Lake Station"
- "A Forgotten Tragedy"
- "The Horse You Don't See Now"
- "How I Began to Write"
- "A Mountain Forest"
- "The Free Selector : A Comedietta"
- "Free Hospitality"
- "Lapsed Gentlefolk"
- "Shearing in the Riverina, New South Wales"
- "Ancient Sydney"
- "After Long Years"
- "In the Droving Days"
- "The Australian Native-Born Type"
- "My School Days"
- "Sydney, Fifty Years Ago"
- "Old Time Thoroughbreds"
- "The First Port Fairy Hunt"
- "Bendemeer"
- "Sport in Australia"
- "Old Stock-Riders"
- "Mount Macedon"
- "Walks Abroad"
- "From Tumut to Tumberumba"
- "In the Throes of a Drought"
- "A Spring Sketch"
- "New Years Day 1886"
- "A Dry Time"
- "In the Bloom of the Year"
- "Fallen Among Thieves"
- "A Transformation Scene"
- "In Bushranging Days"

== Critical reception ==
A reviewer in The Advertiser (Adelaide) was impressed with the whole collection. "No one who finds a charm in the romantic episodes of early bush life can fail to be delighted with Mr. Rolf Boldrewood's latest work, In Bad Company, and Other Stories (Macmillan). Bushranging, squatting, droving, gold mining, and countless other phases of colonial existence furnish themes for the facile pen of the author of Robbery Under Arms, and, indeed, no subject connected with Australian life seems to come amiss to him."

In The West Australian the reviewer noted: "Boldrewood is eminently an entertaining causeur, and his short tales, interspersed with exquisite bits of nature, are his greatest charm. Even where he turns to more ambitious work he cannot abandon this method, and in the midst of a sentence he stops to make a most irrelevant explanation in brackets as to the scientific name of the native cat. On things Australian he is such an undoubted authority that it is no exaggeration to say that from his books, and from this book in particular, one may learn more about Australian life than from most of the so-called Australian novels put together."

== See also ==
- Full text of the volume is available from the University of Michigan
- 1901 in Australian literature
