= An Australian Girl in London =

1902 novel by Louise Mack

- Author: Louise Mack
- Language: English
- Genre: Fiction
- Publisher: T. Fisher Unwin, London
- Publication date: 1902
- Publication place: Australia
- Media type: Print
- Pages: 295pp
- Preceded by: Girls Together
- Followed by: Children of the Sun

An Australian Girl in London (1902) is a novel by Australian author Louise Mack.

== Plot summary ==
Told in the form of a series of letters, the book details the travels of Sylvia Leighton from Australia to London, and her impressions of that city after she arrives.

== Notes ==
- Dedication: "To Lord Beauchamp, late governor of New South Wales, this little book is offered - a slight tribute to deep kindness and sympathy extended towards my fellow-workers, so far away over seas [sic]. Signed, Louise Creed, London 1902."

== Critical reception ==
A reviewer in The Sydney Morning Herald found a lot to like about the book: "The first impressions of a thoughtful and observant person are worth having, especially when they are pleasantly and vividly recorded." And, picking up on a major story point, noted that "a good many people have missed their trains, but few have had such whimsical adventures as the heroine of this story experienced in consequence of being left behind at Naples and finding it necessary with the aid of little money and less Italian to pick up her party at Marseilles. The book is pleasantly and simply written, and the author is not ashamed to admit her enthusiasm at what she sees."

The Evening Journal (Adelaide) reviewer was a little more equivocal: "People express various opinions of this book. Some call it delightful, others describe it as utter rubbish. Perhaps the verdict depends in one degree on the attitude of mind in which the reader approaches it. If, he, or she, is on the lookout for a story, disappointment is unavoidable. The book has neither plot nor incident. There is a little bit of a love story dragged in at the end in deference to popular opinion; it is not well managed, and rather spoils the book. Notwithstanding, or perhaps because of this absence of love story and plot (for do we not get plenty of both, too much sometimes, in other books?) the Australian Girl in London has a charm of her own."

== See also ==
- 1902 in Australian literature
- Louise Mack, An Australian Girl in London [reprint] 2018 (ed.) Sarah Pope, Melbourne: Grattan Street Press
