= The Camp Within the West =

1898 poem by Roderic Quinn

- by Roderic Quinn
- First published in: The Bulletin
- Country: Australia
- Language: English
- Publication date: 15 October 1898
- Lines: 36

Full text
- The Camp Within the West at Wikisource

"The Camp Within the West" is an 1898 poem by Australian poet Roderic Quinn.

It was first published in The Bulletin on 15 October 1898, and later in the poet's collections and other Australian poetry anthologies.

== Analysis ==
An observer notes a troop of men go by, "as pale as pale can be". Their "camp is in the West", as they march off to the land of the dead.

In a short piece titled "War: And Poetry" for The Bulletin Dowell O'Reilly called this poem "perhaps our most beautiful stray flower of verse, in its perfect inter-dependence of emotion and form."

== Further publications ==
After the poem's initial publication in The Bulletin it was reprinted as follows:

- The Hidden Tide by Roderic Quinn, Bulletin, 1899
- The Bulletin, 29 December 1900
- The Golden Treasury of Australian Verse edited by Bertram Stevens, Angus and Robertson, 1909
- The Oxford Book of Australasian Verse edited by Walter Murdoch, Oxford University Press, 1918
- Poems by Roderic Quinn, Angus and Robertson, 1920
- An Australasian Anthology : Australian and New Zealand Poems edited by Percival Serle, R. H. Croll, and Frank Wilmot, Collins, 1927
- The Bulletin, 29 January 1930
- A Girdle of Song : By Poets of England, Scotland, Wales, Northern Ireland, Eire, Canada, Australia, New Zealand, India, South Africa, and Rhodesia edited Edith M. Fry, British Authors' Press, 1944
- Australian Bush Songs and Ballads edited by Will Lawson, Frank Johnson, 1944
- Poets of Australia : An Anthology of Australian Verse edited by George Mackaness, Angus & Robertson, 1946
- An Anthology of Australian Verse edited by George Mackaness, Angus & Robertson, 1952
- From the Ballads to Brennan edited by T. Inglis Moore, Angus & Robertson, 1964

== See also ==
- 1898 in poetry
- 1898 in literature
- 1898 in Australian literature
- Australian literature
