= Roslyn Philp =

Australian judge

Sir Roslyn Foster Bowie Philp KBE (27 July 1895 – 19 March 1965) was appointed as a judge to the Supreme Court of Queensland, which is the highest ranking court in the Australian State of Queensland. He served as a puisne judge 4 May 1939 until 8 February 1956. He served as a senior puisne judge from 9 February 1956 until his death in March 1965.

Philp's father was the journalist and author James Philp.

== See also ==
- Judiciary of Australia
- List of Judges of the Supreme Court of Queensland
