= Marjorie Pizer =

Australian poet

- Born: 1920; Melbourne
- Died: 4 January 2016 (aged 95–96)
- Education: University of Melbourne
- Writing career
- Genre: poetry

Marjorie Pizer (1920 – 4 January 2016) was an Australian poet.

== Life ==
Pizer was born in Melbourne and studied literature at the University of Melbourne from 1939, graduating with a Bachelor of Arts. Pizer began her working life as a clerk in the public service. She met and married the poet Muir Holburn (q.v.) and they left for Sydney, where they became members of the Communist Party (until the invasion of Hungary). In 1947 they set up Pinchgut Press in a spare room. She was enamoured of poetry since a young age before beginning to compose her own works.

== Bibliography ==
- Creeve Roe, Poems of Victor Daley; co-editor with Muir Holburn, 1947
- Freedom on the Wallaby : Poems of the Australian People; editor, 1953
- The Men Who Made Australia, Stories and Poems by Henry Lawson; editor, 1957
- co-editor with Joan Reed, Come Listen, Poetry for Schools, Sydney : Angus and Robertson, 1966. OCLC 219802865
- Thou and I, Poems, 1967
- To Life, Poems, Sydney : M. Pizer, 1969. OCLC 444663600
- Tides Flow, Poems, 1972
- Seasons of Love, Poems, Sydney : Pinchgut Press, 1975. ISBN 9780959891317, OCLC 1638097
- Full Summer, Poems, Sydney : Pinchgut Press, 1977. ISBN 9780959891331, OCLC 4191385
- Gifts and Remembrances, Poems, Sydney : Pinchgut Press, 1979. ISBN 9780959891355, OCLC 5996079
- To You the Living, Poems of Bereavement and Loss, 1981, 1991, 1992, 2010
- The Sixtieth Spring, Poems, Sydney : Pinchgut Press, 1982. ISBN 9780959891386, OCLC 27630448
- Below the Surface, Reflections on Life and Living; co-authored with Anne Spencer Parry, 1982, 1990, 1994
- Selected Poems, 1963-1983, 1984
- Poems of Lesbia Harford; co-editor with Drusilla Modjeska, 1985
- Equinox, Poems, 1987
- Fire in the Heart, Poems, Sydney : Pinchgut Press, 1990. ISBN 9780949625038, OCLC 27612981
- Journeys, Poems, Sydney : Pinchgut Press, 1992. ISBN 9780949625052, OCLC 37093742
- Winds of Change, Poems, Sydney : Pinchgut Press, 1995. ISBN 9780949625069, OCLC 38263996
- Await the Spring, Poems, 1998
- A Fortunate Star, Poems, Sydney, N.S.W. : Pinchgut Press, 2001. ISBN 9780949625083, OCLC 223140543
- A Poet's Life, Poems, 2006, 2010
- Poems, Poems, 2010
