= A Sunset Fantasy =

1888 poem by Australian poet Victor Daley

- by Victor Daley
- First published in: The Bulletin
- Country: Australia
- Language: English
- Publication date: 21 January 1888

Full text
- A Sunset Fantasy at Wikisource

"A Sunset Fantasy" (1888) is a poem by Australian poet Victor Daley.

It was originally published in The Bulletin on 21 January 1888, and was subsequently reprinted in the author's single-author collections and a number of Australian poetry anthologies.

The author is spellbound by a magnificent sunset which seems to banish any thoughts and fears of Death or Doubt.

== Critical reception ==
Writing for the Bulletin 's Red Page a reviewer was rather taken by the poem: "One imagines that when Daley’s book of verses is published—it is promised in a week or three—"A Sunset Fantasy" will remain the most fragrant of all the fragrant poems he has penned. This opinion, of course, is subject to revision; for Daley's Bulletin contributions have covered such a space of time that perforce one must have unwillingly forgotten some and the value of some—and, in any case, relationship in a book puts scattered fragments in different lights and perspective. But even Daley's book will doubtfully hold anything finer than the finest thing in the way of picturesque poetry yet done in Australia."

Recalling his first reading of the poem E. J. Brady stated: "I sensed allied art and feeling in all its beautiful lines, and thereafter I have always bracketed Victor Daley with John Keats. Daley may not be as great as Keats, but he has much of Keats's quality."

== Publication history ==
After the poem's initial publication in The Bulletin in 1888 it was reprinted as follows:

- The Bulletin, 11 June 1898 and 19 April 1902
- A Golden Shanty: Australian Stories and Sketches in Prose and Verse, Bulletin, 1890
- At Dawn and Dusk by Victor Daley, 1898
- The Golden Treasury of Australian Verse edited by Bertram Stevens, Angus and Robertson, 1909

== See also ==
- 1888 in Australian literature
- 1888 in poetry
