= Girls Together =

Novel by Australian writer Louise Mack

- Author: Louise Mack
- Language: English
- Genre: Fiction
- Publisher: Angus and Robertson, Australia
- Publication date: 1898
- Publication place: Australia
- Media type: Print
- Pages: 226 pp
- Preceded by: Teens: A Story of Australian School Girls
- Followed by: An Australian Girl in London

Girls Together (1898) is a novel by Australian writer Louise Mack. The novel is a sequel to Mack's earlier book, Teens: A Story of Australian School Girls (1897). In its original publication it was accompanied by 4 interior illustrations by Australian artist G. W. Lambert.

== Abstract ==
"Miss Mack treats of that phase in the life of a girl when she leaves or is about to game of life which is being played before her; when she is yet in possession of a dearest, friend to whom are given all her whisperings; when she is wont to declare and cry out against the folly of ever marrying. And Miss Mack paints this phase brightly and well, albeit there are chapters that seem superfluous; that have a hang-dog look of being twisted in to make a larger book, and having nothing to say to justify their existence beyond some humor. But continuing to road and conduct this criticism from the point of view of the average young girl, we will concede that the inconsequent chapters are full of vim, and interest of an anecdotal kind."

== Critical reception ==
The Sydney Morning Herald praised the book: "There is a brightness and cheeriness about this new addition to Australian literature which is very welcome nowadays, when decadent poets sing woefully about the greyness of Australian life. And these girls—how charmingly human they are. They are Sydney girls, the like of whom, fortunately, are to be found in many a home. Not more romantic some of them than, say, the tram in which they travel to school; but with hearts ready to respond to the notes of love and duty and self-sacrifice. Miss Mack treats with natural sympathy of one of her girls who has entered triumphantly on a successful career in art, but she is no less admirable in her picture of the girl who failed."

A reviewer in Freeman's Journal (Sydney) noted that Louise Mack "infuses a charm of simple child converse into her books which is positively refreshing in an age when the average clever bookmaker of the feminine gender throws all her ability into controversies which are alike unhealthy to the intellect as to the morals of their readers. At the same time that a book like Girls Together affords interesting pabalum to our Australian girls, their mothers, fathers, and brothers should not deem it unprofitable to read them; for there lies therein many a lesson which the high-pressure-living families of the day might well take to heart. There is nothing special to quote from Mrs. Creed's latest book; but we can truthfully sum it up as a distinct success in 'girl' fiction."

== Publication history ==
After its original publication in 1898 by Angus and Robertson, the novel was published as follows:

- Andrew Melrose, UK, 1903 and 1905
- Pilgrim Press, UK, 1903 and 1930
- Angus and Robertson, Australia, 1910 and 1923
- Cornstalk Publishing, 1925 and 1927

== See also ==
- 1898 in Australian literature
