= The Circling Hearths =

1901 poetry collection by Roderic Quinn

- Author: Roderic Quinn
- Language: English
- Genre: Poetry collection
- Publisher: Bulletin Books
- Publication date: 1901
- Publication place: Australia
- Media type: Print
- Pages: 31 pp.

The Circling Hearths is a collection of poetry by Roderic Quinn, published by Bulletin Books in 1901.

The collection contains 16 poems, all previously published in The Bulletin, with the exception of "A Caress", which first appeared in the Australian Magazine.

== Contents ==
- "The Circling Hearth-Fires"
- "Love's Legacy"
- "I Shall Remember"
- "Derelict"
- "Irony"
- "A Caress"
- "The Voice of Spring"
- "At End of a Holiday"
- "The Craft of Blue"
- "In the Gardens"
- "Love and Intuition"
- "As the Tide Turns"
- "Mid-Forest Fear"
- "The Glory-Call"
- "The Furnace-Room"
- "The Currency Lass"

== Critical reception ==
A reviewer in The Queenslander found this collection to be "a volume of transition; and its author is still feeling his way towards his ultimate dominant note." They also noted that the author still had the "requisites that go to the making of a master."

== See also ==
- 1901 in Australian literature

== Notes ==
Dedication: 'To the Commonwealth.'
