= The Woman at the Washtub =

1902 poem by Australian poet Victor Daley

"The Woman at the Washtub "
- by Victor Daley
- First published in: The Bulletin
- Country: Australia
- Language: English
- Publication date: 29 November 1902
- Lines: 56

Full text
- The Woman at the Washtub at Wikisource

"The Woman at the Washtub" (1902) is a poem by Australian poet Victor Daley.

It was originally published in The Bulletin on 29 November 1902, and was subsequently reprinted in the author's single-author collections and a number of Australian poetry anthologies.

== Critical reception ==
In a lecture titled "Literature in the Eighteen Nineties in Australia", delivered in 1956, critic G. A. Wilkes noted that "literature inspired by national sentiment or by the zeal of the reformer is artistically the most insecure of all, and in Australian literature in the nineties, this insecurity is always present." He chose this poem as an example of that sentiment, continuing: "This is a piece of social commentary which Daley does not intend to be comic, but the poem can hardly be read with a straight face."

== Publication history ==
After the poem's initial publication in The Bulletin in 1902 it was reprinted as follows:

- Wine and Roses by Victor J. Daley, edited by Bertram Stevens, Angus and Robertson, 1911
- The Worker, vol. 23 no. 17, 23 April 1914
- The Register, 26 May 1925
- Creeve Roe : Poetry edited by Muir Holburn and Marjorie Pizer, Pinchgut Press, 1947
- Freedom on the Wallaby : Poems of the Australian People edited by Marjorie Pizer, Pinchgut Press, 1953
- Australian Verse from 1805 : A Continuum edited by Geoffrey Dutton, Rigby, 1976
- The New Oxford Book of Australian Verse edited by Les Murray, Oxford University Press, 1986
- Australian Verse : An Oxford Anthology edited by John Leonard, Oxford University Press, 1998
- An Australian Treasury of Popular Verse edited by Jim Haynes, ABC Books, 2002
- Our Country : Classic Australian Poetry : From Colonial Ballads to Paterson & Lawson edited by Michael Cook, Little Hills Press, 2002
- An Anthology of Australian Poetry to 1920 edited by John Kinsella, University of Western Australia Library, 2007
- Two Centuries of Australian Poetry edited by Kathrine Bell, Gary Allen, 2007
- The Puncher & Wattmann Anthology of Australian Poetry edited by John Leonard, Puncher & Wattmann, 2009

== See also ==
- 1902 in Australian literature
- 1902 in poetry
