= Victor Daley =

Irish-Australian writer

Victor James Daley
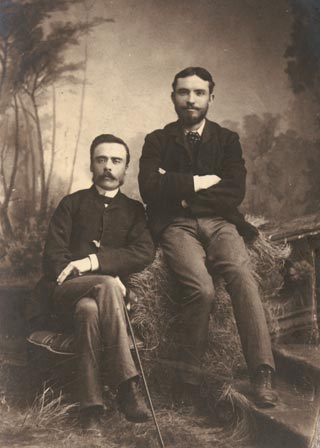
- Victor Daley (at right) (c. 1880–1900)
- Born: Victor James William Patrick Daley; 5 September 1858; Navan, County Meath, Ireland
- Died: 29 December 1905 (aged 47); Sydney, New South Wales, Australia
- Occupation: Poet

Victor James William Patrick Daley (5 September 1858 – 29 December 1905) was an Australian poet. Daley serves chiefly as an example of the Celtic Twilight in Australian verse. He also serves as a lyrical alternative to his contemporary bush balladists of Henry Lawson, Banjo Paterson, and Will H. Ogilvie.

== Life ==
Daley was born at the Navan, County Meath, Ireland, (Note: Some articles incorrectly indicate Navan was in County Armagh, such as the Australian Dictionary of Biography (1981).) and was educated at the Christian Brothers at Devonport in England. He arrived in Australia in 1878, and became a freelance journalist and writer in both Melbourne and Sydney. Whilst in Melbourne, he met and became a friend of Marcus Clarke; later, in Sydney, he became acquainted with Henry Kendall. He is notable for becoming the first author in Australia who tried to earn a living from writing alone.

In Sydney in 1898, he founded the bohemian Dawn and Dusk Club, and the later Supper Club, which had many notable members such as writer Henry Lawson. Together with fellow notable poet Louise Mack, he organised the farewell dinner to Scottish-Australian poet and bush balladeer Will H. Ogilvie (1869–1963) in 1901 at the Hotel Australia, Sydney. Banjo Paterson and Roderic Quinn were also present at the send-off.

He used the pseudonym Creeve Roe (Irish for Red Branch, the area next to the Navan where Cú Chulainn trained as a Red Branch Knight), as well as his own name.

Daley died at his home in Waitara, Sydney of tuberculosis and was buried in the Roman Catholic section of Waverley Cemetery.

=== Legacy ===
His work was not considered particularly Australian in nature, but quite lyrical, with 'natural delicacy of expression, graceful imagery, and refinement of language'. His Poems (1908) and other collections were published posthumously. Daley's finest Australian work was considered to be A Sunset Fantasy.

When he died, Scottish-Australian poet and bush balladeer Will H. Ogilvie (1869–1963) penned:

When 'the little folk' meet by the red rowan tree

The dance shall be stayed in the ring on the plot

While they twine in his green Irish isle of the sea

The wreath we forgot.

A memoir of Daley by Bertram Stevens was published in Wine and Roses.

== Bibliography ==
- At Dawn and Dusk (1898)
- Wine and Roses (1911)
- Creeve Roe (1947)

=== Selected list of poems ===
Title	Year	First published	Reprinted/collected in
"A Sunset Fantasy"	1888	The Bulletin, 21 January 1888	At Dawn and Dusk, Angus and Robertson, 1898, pp. 128-131
"When London Calls"	1900	The Bulletin, 8 December 1900	Wine and Roses edited by Bertram Stevens, Angus and Robertson, 1911, pp. 102-104
"The Woman at the Washtub"	1902	The Bulletin, 29 November 1902	Wine and Roses edited by Bertram Stevens, Angus and Robertson, 1911, pp. 77-79

Others

Daley in 1890s

- "The First of May" (1882)
- "At the Opera" (1883)
- "Dreams" (1883)
- "On the River" (1885) (also known as "Years After")
- "On the Shore" (1885) (also known as "Sunset")
- "Brunette" (1886)
- "Poppies" (1886)
- "The Old Wife and the New" (1887)
- "Even So" (1890)
- "Lachesis" (1891)
- "A-Roving" (1892)
- "Cares" (1892)
- "Correggio Jones" (1898)
- "The Woods of Dandenong" (1899)
- "Players" (1900)
- "Anna" (1902)
- "The Night Ride" (1907)
