= James Philp =

Australian journalist and author

James Philp (ca. 1860 – 28 June 1935) was a Scottish-born Australian journalist and author, the one who drafted the rules of the Dawn and Dusk Club of which Australian writer Henry Lawson was a prominent member. After writing for New Zealand newspapers, in Sydney in 1888 he founded Australia's first Chinese newspaper, later moving to Brisbane where he wrote for the Courier. His son, Sir Roslyn Foster Bowie Philp, was a prominent Queensland judge.
