= Dawn and Dusk Club =

Sydney, New South Wales club

The Dawn and Dusk Club, or Dawn and Duskers, was a Sydney-based Australian Bohemian club of writer friends from the late 19th century who met for drinks and camaraderie. Writer Henry Lawson was a prominent member of the club. The motto was Roost high and crow low.

== History ==
The club was formed around 1898 in Sydney, Australia by poet Victor Daley, and named after his best known book of verses. It was based on the Gawler Humbug Society. The club met at Fred J. Broomfield's home on the corner of Ice Road and Great Barcom Street, Darlinghurst, near St Vincent's Hospital, Sydney about September, 1898.

Foundation members of 'the Duskers', a small and exclusive group of friends, were Daley, Broomfield, James Philp, Herbert Low (journalist), William Bede Melville (a reporter for the Sydney newspaper, The Star), Angus Sinclair (writer), Bertram Stevens and Randolph Bedford.

Daley was elected 'Symposiarch' of the Duskers and the seven 'heptarchs' were Lawson, Stevens, Nelson Illingworth, Frank P. Mahony, George Augustine Taylor, Con Lindsay (journalist), and Philp, who drafted the rules. Artists Norman Lindsay and Albert Henry Fullwood were also members. Truth magazine publisher John Norton called them "a band of boozy, bar-bumming bards".

The Dawn and Dusk Club was succeeded by the Supper Club, the rules of which were written in Chinese. Daley was still very much part of the new Bohemian club, which also included journalist J. F. Archibald.
