= Louis Paul =

American short story writer and novelist

Leroi Placet, known by his pen name Louis Paul (c. 1902 – February 13, 1970), was an American short story writer and novelist.

He corresponded with John Steinbeck. His work appeared in American Mercury and Esquire. He adapted his book Breakdown into the play The Cup of Trembling, which opened in Boston April 5, 1948.

== Awards ==
- 1934 O. Henry Award

== Works ==
- The pumpkin coach. Literary Guild. 1935.
- A horse in Arizona. Doubleday, Doran. 1936.
- Emma. Doubleday, Doran. 1937.
- The man who left home. The Black cat press. 1938.
- A passion for privacy. Knopf. 1940.
- The Reverend Ben Pool: a novel. Duell, Sloan and Pearce. 1941.
- This is my brother: a novel. Crown publishers. 1943.
- Breakdown. Crown publishers. 1946.
- A father in the family. Crown Publishers. 1951.
- The man who came home. Crown Publishers. 1953.
- Heroes, kings, and men. Dial Press. 1955.
- Dara, the Cypriot. Simon and Schuster. 1959.
- Papa Luigi's marionettes. I. Washburn. 1962.
- The way art happens. Washburn. 1963.

=== Anthologies ===
- Charles Grayson (2005). "A Cup of Coffee". Stories for Men: An Anthology. Kessinger Publishing. ISBN 978-1-4191-1333-8.
- Arnold Gingrich, ed. (1953). The Esquire treasury: the best of twenty years of Esquire. Simon and Schuster.
