= Heinrich Anacker =

Swiss–German author

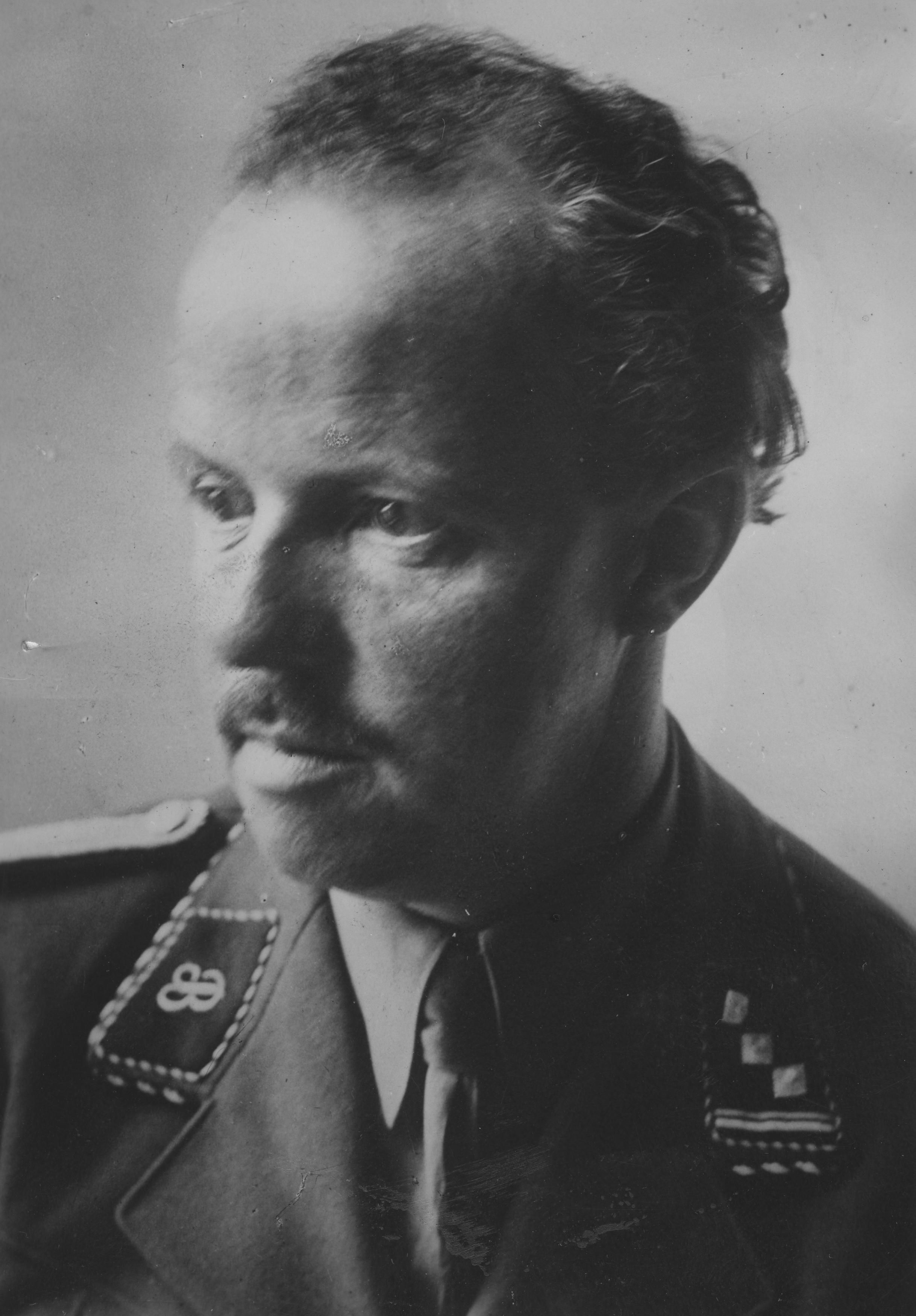
Heinrich Anacker in May 1940

Heinrich Anacker (29 January 1901 – 14 January 1971) was a Swiss–German author.

Anacker was born in Buchs, Aargau. He entered National Socialist circles in Vienna in 1922, joined the SA, and after 1933 lived in Berlin as a freelance writer. He wrote a spate of SA and Hitler Youth songs and was considered the "lyricist of the Brown Front"; he won the 1934 Dietrich Eckart Prize and the 1936 NSDAP Prize for Art. Nonetheless, after the war he was classified as only minimally incriminated. His poetry collections include Die Trommel (The Drum; 1931), Der Aufbau (Uplift; 1936), and Glück auf, es geht gen Morgen (Hurrah, It Will Soon Be Morning; 1943).

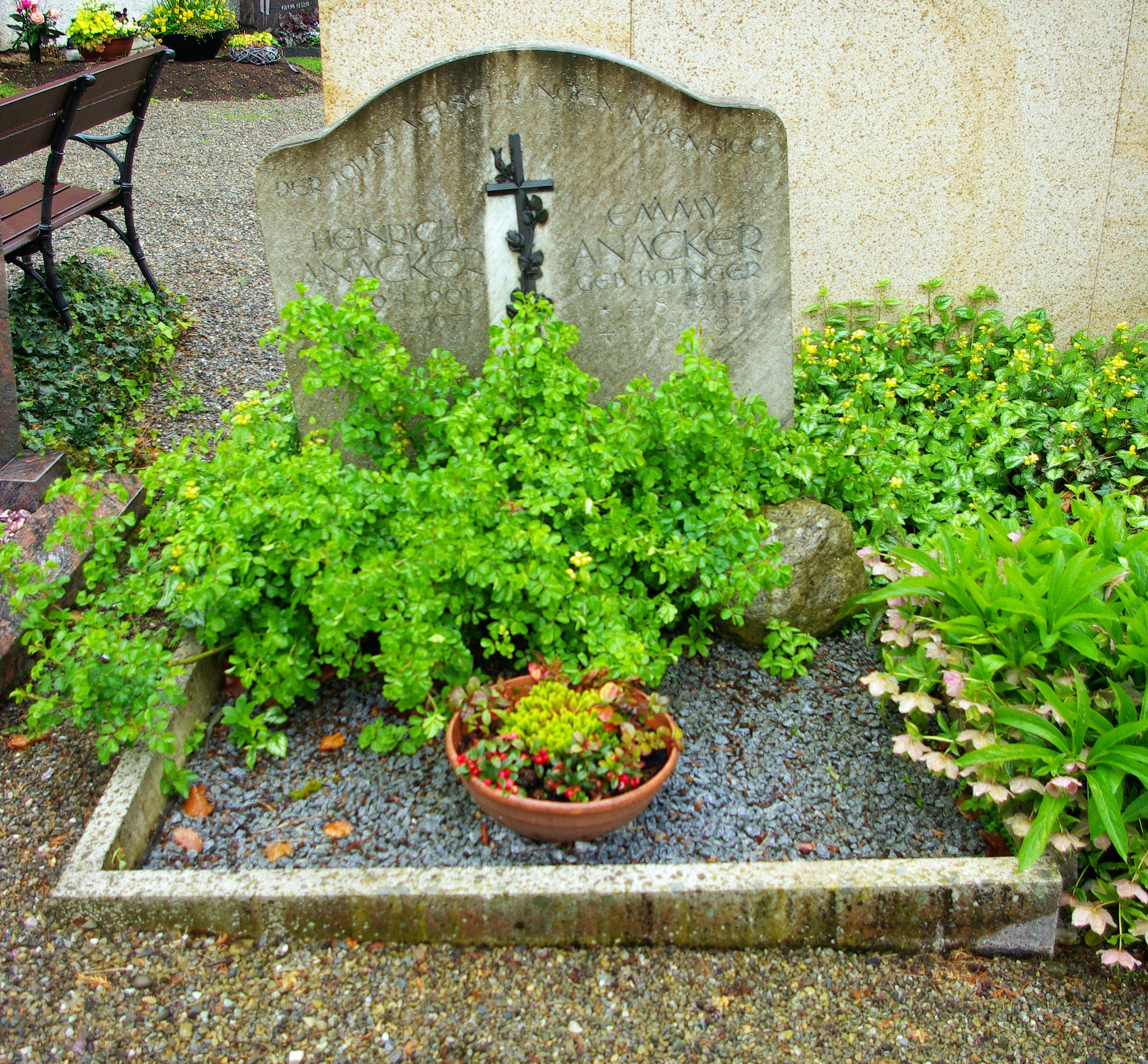
Grave of Heinrich Anacker in Wasserburg am Bodensee

He died in Wasserburg am Bodensee aged 69.
