= The Devastators (Cambridge novel) =

Book by Ada Cambridge

- Author: Ada Cambridge
- Language: English
- Genre: Fiction
- Publisher: Methuen, London
- Publication date: 1901
- Publication place: Australia
- Media type: Print
- Pages: 310pp
- Preceded by: Path and Goal
- Followed by: Sisters

The Devastators (1901) is a novel by Australian writer Ada Cambridge.

== Story outline ==
The novel considers the impacts on two ill-made marriages: Peggy Le Marchand is married to Harry Bedingfield, but should have married Dr. Dallas who is actually married to Mimi Rochester.

== Critical reception ==
A reviewer in Freeman's Journal was underwhelmed by the book noting it is "described as 'a novel with a purpose.' Masters of the craft of bookmaking like Dickens also wrote novels with a purpose, the moral of which ran in a thin red line of tragedy carefully woven into a healthy story in which comedy had its share.' In The Devastators the purpose is the whole plot; and, however excellent it may be to hold up the mirror to ill-chosen marriages for the instruction of others, the result is rather dismal to the reader in this case."

== Notes ==
In her autobiography Thirty Years in Australia published in 1930, Cambridge made the following confession: "When I wrote a novel called The Devastators I knew that I was laying down a rule contradicted in my own circle by two glaring exceptions. This bright and beautiful woman is one of them; the other is a person still nearer to me. I had to apologise to both of them when that book came out. From their childhood they have been exposed to flatteries that should have spoiled them utterly; both have proved unspoilable. In the case of one of the pretty faces, it does not even care to look at itself in the glass; the mere ordinary vanity of the ordinary female is lacking. So that to this large extent my theory of the effect of physical charm upon its possessor is discredited. While I am glad to state the fact, I am sorry to remain of the opinion that such exceptions are exceptions, and that the rule is still the rule."

== See also ==
- 1901 in Australian literature
