= At Dawn and Dusk =

1898 poetry collection by Victor Daley

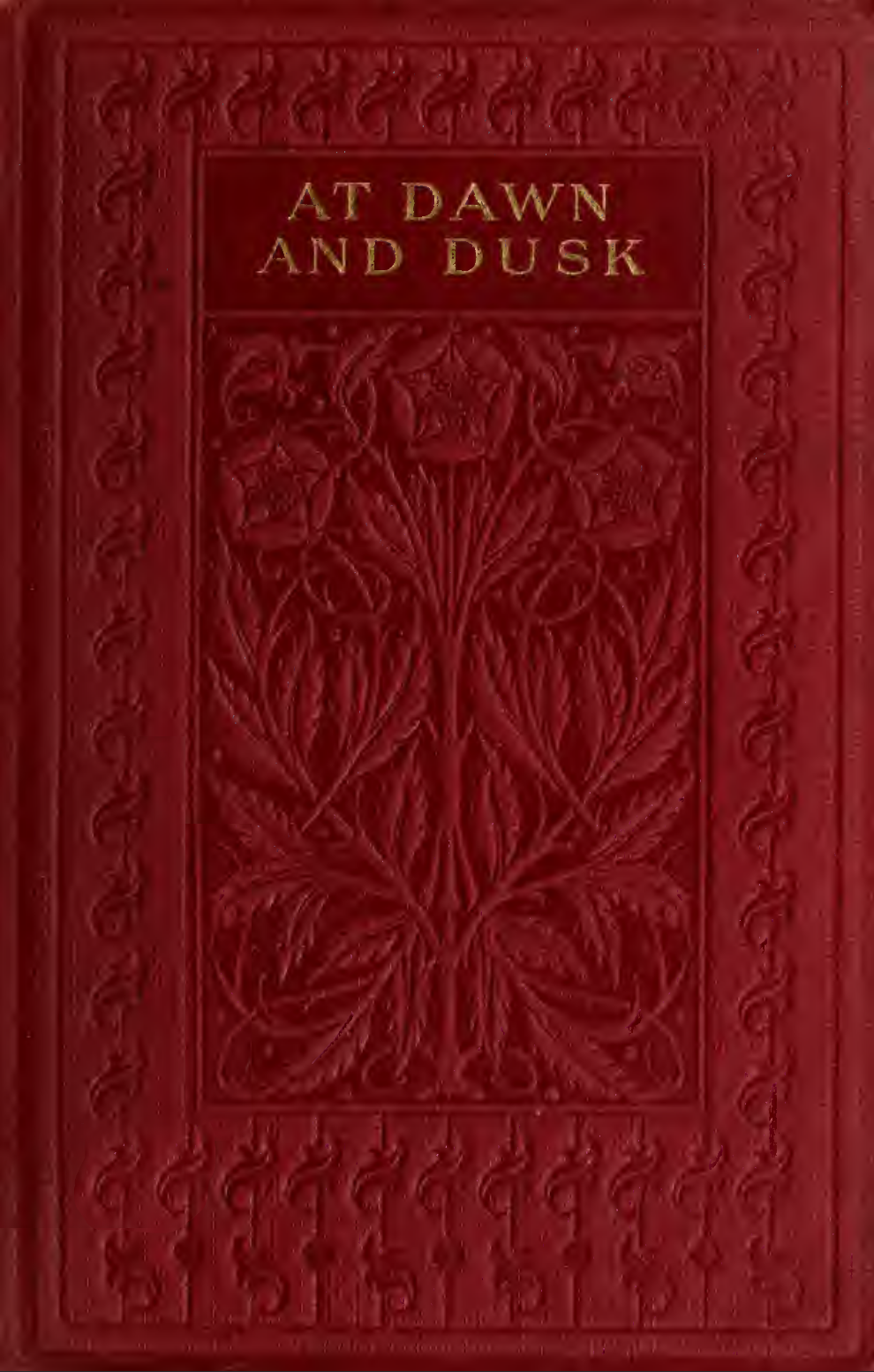
- Author: Victor J. Daley
- Language: English
- Genre: Poetry collection
- Publisher: Angus and Robertson
- Publication date: 1898
- Publication place: Australia
- Media type: Print (hardback & paperback)
- Pages: 211 pp
- Preceded by: –
- Followed by: Wine and Roses

At Dawn and Dusk (1898) was the first collection of poems by Australian poet Victor Daley. It was released in Australia in hardback by Angus and Robertson in 1898, and also that same year in London by publishers James Bowden.

The original collection includes 67 poems by the author that are reprinted from various sources, though they mainly originally appeared in The Bulletin.

== Contents ==
- "Dreams"
- "Lethe"
- "Love Laurel : In Memory of Henry Kendall"
- "A Vision of Youth"
- "Aphrodite"
- "The Rajah's Sapphires"
- "The Cruise of the 'In Memoriam'"
- "In a Wine Cellar"
- "A-Roving"
- "Brunette"
- "Years Ago"
- "Villanelle"
- "The Voice of the Soul"
- "Cares"
- "Ponce de Leon"
- "Life and Death : Death"
- "Life and Death : Life"
- "Christmas in Australia : A Sonnet"
- "Questions : A Sonnet"
- "The Gods : A Sonnet"
- "The Gleaner"
- "Love"
- "Passion Flower"
- "Song : To My Lady"
- "The Hawthorn"
- "Spring Dirge"
- "A Description"
- "Sunset"
- "Years After"
- ""Unto This Last""
- "The Nightingale"
- "The Two Keys"
- "Lachesis"
- "Symbols"
- "At the Opera"
- "Neaera's Wreath"
- "Camilla"
- "Sixty to Sixteen"
- "Bouquet and Bracelet"
- "Cupid's Funeral"
- "The First of May"
- "A Ghost"
- "Even So"
- "Song"
- "A Sunset Fantasy"
- "Poppies"
- "Amaranth"
- "The Little People"
- "A King in Exile"
- "Tamerlane"
- "The Dead Child"
- "In Memory of an Actress"
- "The River Maiden"
- "A Picture"
- "Sea-Gifts"
- "Day and Night"
- "The Poet Care"
- "Voices"
- "The Ascetic"
- "The Serpent's Legacy"
- "His Soul"
- "The Dream of Margaret"
- "The Martyr"
- "His Mate"
- "The Old Wife and The New"
- "A Christmas Eve"
- "At Night"

== Notes ==
The collection carried a dedication from the author as follows:

TO MY SISTER

In memory of our young days ashine
With dreams, when life was yet an opening rose,
Take, Alice dear, this little book of mine,
All made of dreams and dying sunset-glows,
A lonely bird that singeth far apart—
Yet shall sing sweeter in its home, your heart.

== Critical reception ==
A reviewer in The Brisbane Courier opined that "Mr. Daley's book will be welcomed by every man and woman in Australia who can appreciate sweet thought clothed in faultless verse. So far there is nothing in the book which can lay claim to greatness, but there is in many parts of it work which has both of the qualities Matthew Arnold yearned for : "sweetness and light." Mr. Daley is a gifted and accomplished writer. His workmanship is in every way commendable. There is no occasion to despair of higher things while we have such singers."

In their review The Australian Town and Country Journal found much to like about the volume: "Mr. Daley takes a more ambitious flight than most of his Australian poetical contemporaries, as he possesses a keener sense of form, and a more delicate literary touch. He will, not, perhaps, achieve so wide a popularity as his brothers-in-verse, for he practically lacks that element of local color which is so profusely evident in most of their poems. He is a dreamer, given to looking backward and moralising; viewing the world more as a past than as a passing show, and therefore finding it particularly rich in regrets."

== Note ==
You can read the full digitised text of the volume via the Sydney University Library.

== See also ==
- 1898 in Australian literature
- 1898 in poetry
