= Roderic Quinn =

Australian poet 1867–1949

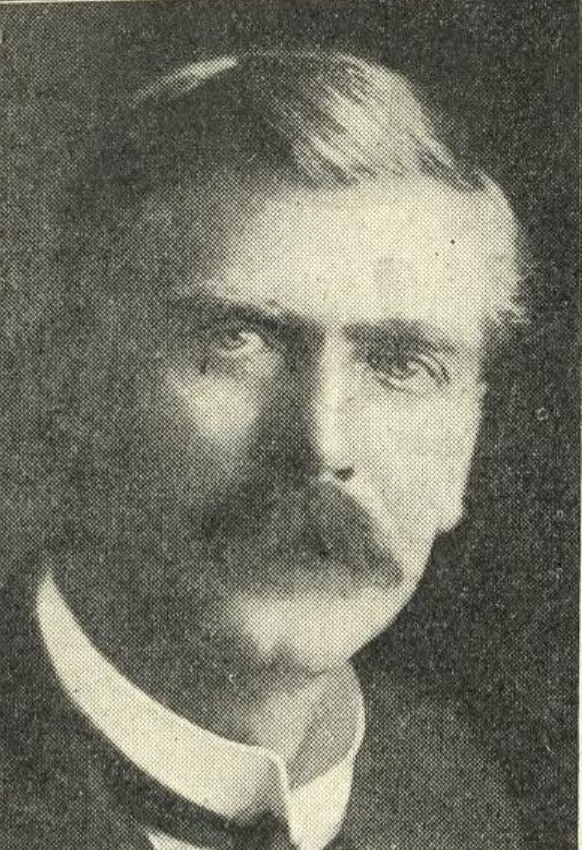
- Born: Roderic Joseph Quinn; 26 November 1867; Surry Hills, New South Wales, Australia
- Died: 15 August 1949 (aged 81); Darlinghurst, New South Wales, Australia
- Occupation: Poet

Roderic Joseph Quinn (26 November 1867 – 15 August 1949) was an Australian poet.

== Early life ==
Quinn was born in Sydney the seventh child of Irish parents: Edward Quinn, letter-carrier, and his wife Catherine. He was educated at Catholic schools, where he met and formed lifelong friendships with Christopher Brennan and E. J. Brady. After finishing school, he studied law irregularly and taught for six months at Milbrulong Provisional Public School, near Wagga Wagga. Then came a short stint as a public servant back in Sydney, where he became editor of the North Sydney News.

== Career ==
Quinn began publishing his poetry in The Bulletin during the 1890s and continued to do so for the rest of his life, writing over 1200 individual pieces in all. He published a novel, Mostyn Stayne, in 1897, but it was not successful. He wrote a number of short stories during his career, but he does not appear to have returned to the novel format. Poetry remained his first calling and The Bulletin his main vehicle. "In later days, Quinn would turn up there each week with something called "Rod Quinn's rent poem", which was bought but not often published."

Quinn by David Low

Quinn was a leading member of the Dawn and Dusk Club in the 1890s, although in contrast to the club's boisterous reputation, he "had an air of courteous deference and a fine sense of humour."

Quinn, together with the poet and journalist Louise Mack, organised the farewell Bohemian dinner for the Scottish-Australian poet and bush balladeer Will H. Ogilvie (1869–1963) in January 1901.

He never married, and supported himself by his writing. In his latter years he was receiving a full Commonwealth Literary pension and a special weekly grant from the government of NSW.

He died in Darlinghurst, New South Wales, in 1949. He was the brother of the politician Patrick Quinn and uncle to the writer Marjorie Quinn.

== Reviews ==
Norman Lindsay observed: "Listening was his distinguished characteristic. He was a very tall man, so that with men of average height he had to bend a little to be on equal terms, and this bending gave him the air of courteous deference. The courtesy was genuine. He was a kindly man, for I never heard him say anything depreciative of others, either their works or their personalities."

On the subject of his verse, The Western Mail referred to his "poetic genius", and stated that he "occupies a high place amongst lyricists of the Commonwealth." Norman Lindsay summed up Quinn's position: "That Rod was what he was defines the small place his poetry takes in this country's literary tradition."

== Novels ==
- Mostyn Stayne (1897)

== Collections ==
- The Hidden Tide (1899)
- The Circling Hearths (1901)
- A Southern Garland (1904)
- Poems (1920)

=== Selected list of poems ===
Title	Year	First published	Reprinted/collected in
"The Fisher"	1898	The Bulletin, 26 February 1898	The Hidden Tide, Angus and Robertson, 1899, p29-30
"The Camp Within the West"	1898	The Bulletin, 15 October 1898	The Hidden Tide, Angus and Robertson, 1899, p31-32
