= Ada Cambridge =

Australian writer (1844–1926)

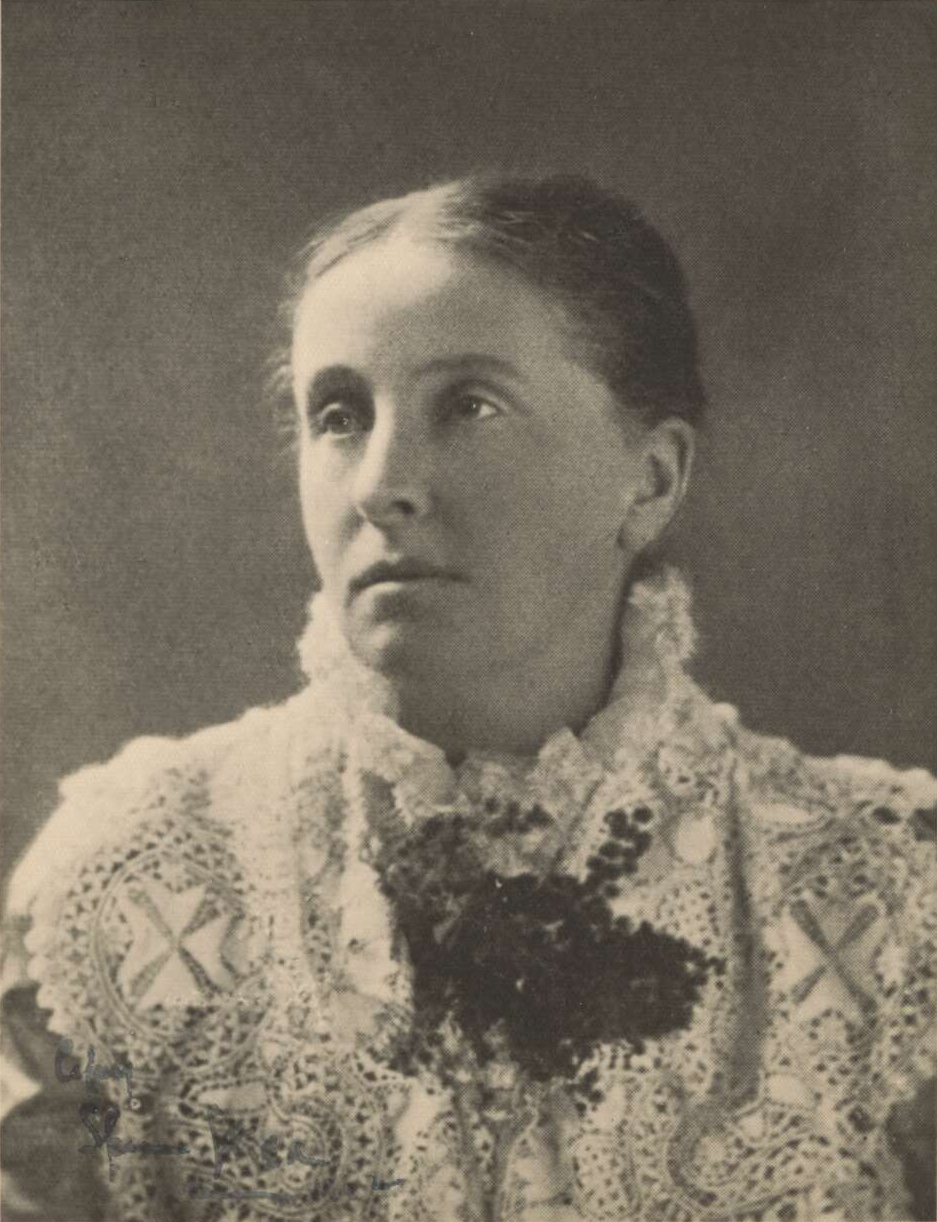
- Ada Cambridge
- Born: 21 November 1844; Wiggenhall St Germans, Norfolk, England
- Died: 19 July 1926 (aged 81); Melbourne, Australia
- Burial place: Brighton General Cemetery
- Other name: Ada Cross
- Spouse: George Frederick Cross
- Children: 5

Ada Cambridge (21 November 1844 – 19 July 1926) was an English-born Australian writer. Born in Norfolk into a middle-class farming family, she began writing hymns and short stories in her teenage years. In 1870, she married a clergyman and moved to Australia, where she and her husband lived in a series of parishes in country Victoria until 1893. To supplement the family's income, Cambridge began publishing serials, short stories, and poetry in Australian newspapers.

By 1893, when the family moved to Williamstown in Melbourne, Cambridge had begun publishing her novels internationally and had established herself as one of the country's leading authors. She wrote around 25 novels, 2 memoirs, and 5 volumes of hymns and poetry during her lifetime. She also contributed essays to international magazines and periodicals, including the Atlantic Monthly and the North American Review. Her writing largely consisted of romance novels, in which she examined society's treatment of women and the social norms surrounding marriage.

While Cambridge was a popular and well-regarded writer during her lifetime, her literary reputation suffered in the years following her death. Her writing was widely dismissed as consisting of shallow and formulaic romances rooted in English traditions, placing it at odds with the emerging nationalist school of bush-centred Australian literature. However, the 1970s saw a resurgence of interest in Cambridge's writing from feminist scholars. Literary scholars have since argued that her writing features more narrative complexity and radicalism than had previously been appreciated, including frequent critiques of organised religion and restrictive social structures.

== Biography ==
=== Early life ===
Ada Cambridge was born into a middle-class family in Wiggenhall St Germans, Norfolk, England, on 21 November 1844. Her mother Thomasina (née Emmerson) was the daughter of a doctor, while her father Henry was a gentleman farmer. Around 1845 or 1846 the family moved to the nearby town of Thorpland. Their finances suffered due to her father's neglect of his farm in favour of recreational pursuits, including hunting and horse riding. During the 1850s the family moved to Downham Market, where her father became a trader of corn and seeds, before moving again to Great Yarmouth in the late 1850s. While living in Great Yarmouth, at least two of Ada's siblings died within a few months, after which the family relocated to Ely in Cambridgeshire.

While Ada's parents regarded her as a gifted child, she received a limited education. She was educated by a series of seven governesses, the majority of whom were poorly educated, and spent a few months at a boarding school before returning due to homesickness. Despite her lack of a formal education, Cambridge was a voracious reader. Her youngest aunt, who worked as a governess for European royal families, took an interest in her education and encouraged her pursuit of literature. She also advised Cambridge during the development of her early literary works.

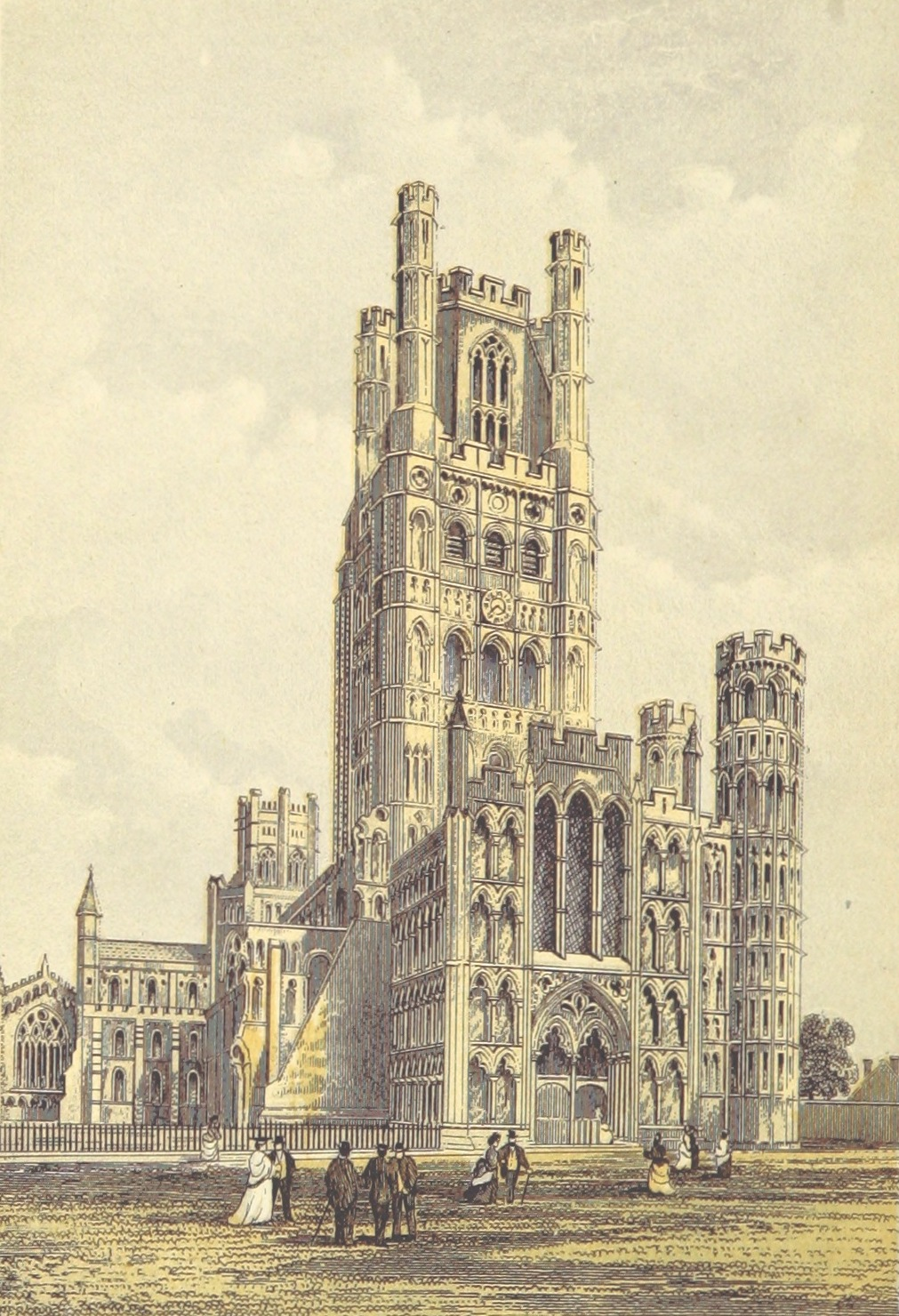
Ely Cathedral, pictured 1874

After moving to Ely, Cambridge's life became increasingly centred on religion. She became a district visitor—a woman in the church who volunteered to assist the clergy, such as by visiting the poor and elderly—and later wrote that she had considered becoming a nun. At around the age of 17 or 18, she began writing hymns for a church magazine. She published her first volume, Hymns on the Litany, in 1865, and followed this with Hymns on the Holy Communion in 1866. By the late 1860s she appeared in biographical dictionaries of hymn writers, where she was described as a talented and popular writer. Her works have been included in several major hymnals.

At the encouragement of her rector's wife, Cambridge wrote her first works of fiction for a church literary competition, in which she won both first and second prize. The priest who judged the competition encouraged her to continue writing, and she began regularly contributing poetry and works of fiction to church magazines and periodicals. Three of her early short stories have survived—"The Two Surplices", "Little Jenny", and "The Vicar's Guest"—all of which are moral tales centred on religious themes and the experiences of the poor.

In 1870 Cambridge was engaged to a curate named George Frederick Cross, whom she had likely met while working as a district visitor in his parish. Cross was the son of a local grocer and had recently graduated from St Augustine's College, a missionary college established to train men to join the clergy in Britain's colonies. After a seven-week engagement, they married on 25 April 1870 in the Holy Trinity Parish Church at Ely Cathedral. On 1 June they sailed for Australia, with plans to return to England soon.

=== Life in Australia ===
==== Wangaratta ====
Ada and George arrived in Australia on 19 August 1870 and spent their first weeks in the colony touring Melbourne. Ada later wrote that she was impressed by the standard of life in the city and by the new public infrastructure that had been established, including the University of Melbourne, the Botanic Gardens, and the newly-constructed Public Library. On 31 August they left Melbourne and travelled to the country parish of Wangaratta, 240 kilometres north of the city, to which George had been appointed curate. The parish was a farming district with a population of around 1400.

Ada and George settled in a cottage on the edge of the town. In May of the following year, Ada gave birth to the first of their five children, Arthur Stuart. She became involved in the town's social and community life and helped to raise money for George's church. In February 1871 Ada published her first literary work written in Australia in The Sydney Mail: a romantic poem titled "From the Battlefield, Good Night". The income that she earned from her writing helped to supplement her husband's meagre clergy stipend; the Church of England in Victoria persistently struggled to support its clergy, paying them far less than other denominations' ministers.

==== Yackandandah and Ballan ====
In January 1872, following George's ordination to the priesthood, they left for his next posting at Yackandandah. The town was located near Beechworth to the north-east of Melbourne and had a population of around 800. George's parish spanned more than 160 kilometres, forcing him to spend much of his time conducting his ministry in the remote parts of the district. Ada played an active role in the parish, playing the church organ, teaching classes at the Sunday school, and conducting the church choir. She published more poetry and fiction in newspapers, allowing her to make an increasingly substantial contribution to the family's income. In November 1873 Ada gave birth to her second child, a daughter named Edith Constance, who died of whooping cough just 10 months later. Her grief at Edith's death led to a crisis of faith and acted as the catalyst for an increasing scepticism towards religious authority, which endured for the remainder of her life. She became depressed and unable to bear remaining in their home; in response, George requested a transfer to a less expansive parish that would require him to spend less time separated from her.

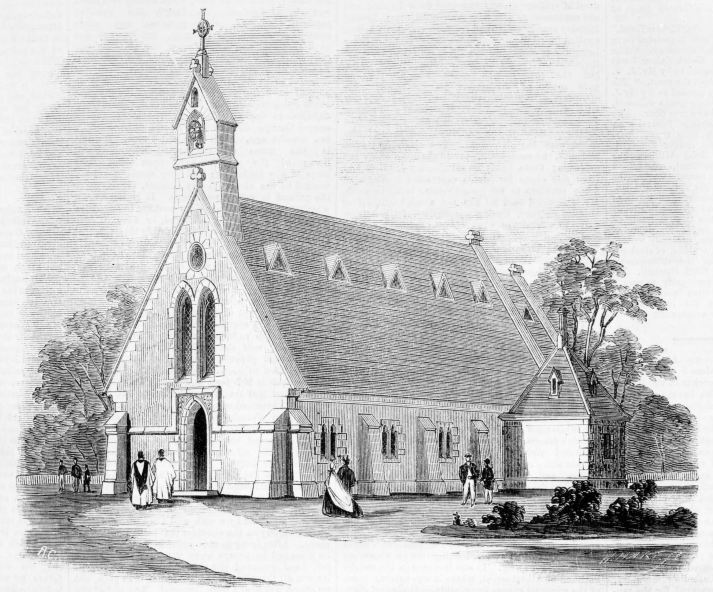
St John's Anglican Church in Ballan

In December 1874, George and Ada moved to Ballan, a town 30 kilometres from Ballarat. The family's financial difficulties became increasingly urgent, with George unable to keep up with the instalments he owed on the debts incurred by their relocation. Ada wrote to the newspaper The Australasian in December 1874 and offered to contribute a serial novel, enclosing the first two chapters of her proposed work. The fourteen-episode romance serial, titled Up the Murray, was published in the newspaper between March and July of 1875 and was Ada's first extended work of fiction. The serial depicts a young woman who migrates to Australia and marries a wealthy man after struggling with the question of whether she is motivated by his wealth or by love. Later that year Ada followed the serial with a volume of romantic and religious poetry titled The Manor House and Other Poems.

In 1876, while Ada was nearing the birth of her third child, her four-year-old son Arthur Stuart died of scarlet fever. She gave birth two weeks later, on 26 April, to a daughter named Vera Lyon. That year, she published another romance serial titled My Guardian in Cassell's Family Magazine. Ada experienced a carriage accident while travelling between Ballan and Ballarat the following year, leaving her with permanent disabilities and back problems.

==== Coleraine ====
In July 1877 Ada and George moved to Coleraine following the establishment of the new Diocese of Ballarat. Their new parish, the Parish of the Wannon, was an expansive sheep-farming district located 370 kilometres west of Melbourne. The rural parish's isolated location forced the family to take on a larger staff, and they quickly found that the parish was in financial difficulties. The strain this placed on George's stipend forced Ada to increase the pace of her writing. Ada gave birth to her fourth child, Hugh Cambridge, on 14 August the following year. She also published her first novel in book form—My Guardian: A Story of the Fen Country—based on the serial she had published two years earlier.

George's stipend was reduced from £300 (equivalent to $50,000 in 2022) to £250 (equivalent to $42,000) in 1879 due to a widespread economic depression, placing further financial pressure on the family. They attempted to raise cattle on their land before abandoning the plan and leasing it to a corn farmer. Ada continued writing, producing two new serial romances about young women finding husbands: In Two Years' Time for The Australasian, and The Captain's Charge for The Sydney Mail. She followed this with another romance serial, Dinah, published in The Australasian between December 1879 and February 1880.

On 3 January 1880 Ada gave birth to her fifth child, a son named Kenneth Stuart. She suffered a breakdown soon after, became housebound, and eventually departed for a retreat in Mount Macedon to recover. She also suffered a near-fatal miscarriage soon after. During her period of recovery, she devoted herself to her writing. Her next serial, A Mere Chance, was published in The Australasian between July and November that year. As her depression deepened in 1881, she began writing increasingly melancholy poetry, including a poem in which she expressed her support for euthanasia. George continued his visits to the remote parts of his parish, leaving Ada alone for long periods with her young children. She published a number of poems expressing her sadness and her crisis of faith. She also published three more serials in 1881 and 1882: Missed in the Crowd, A Girl's Ideal, and Across the Grain. The following year Ada published one of her most popular works, The Three Miss Kings, as a serial in The Australasian. The novel, set upon the backdrop of the Melbourne International Exhibition, depicts three newly orphaned young women who consider what to do with their new-found independence before eventually finding husbands.

==== Sandhurst and Beechworth ====
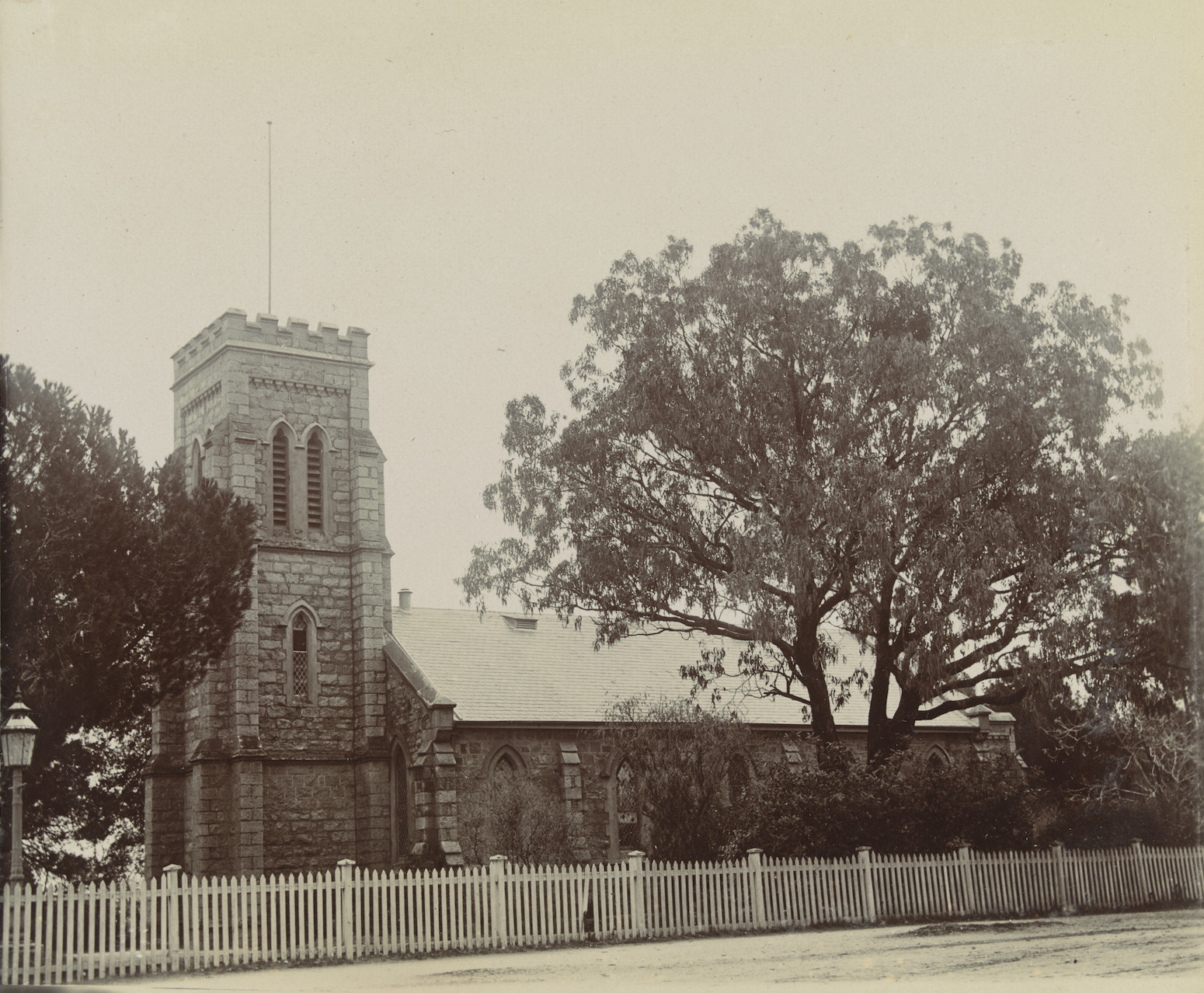
Christ Church in Beechworth pictured c. 1888

In January 1884, the family moved to Sandhurst (now Bendigo), a town of 50,000 that was one of the colony's major centres. That year, Ada wrote four short stories and reworked some of her earlier writing to support the family financially. In March 1885 the family moved again to the large goldfields town of Beechworth where they remained for the next nine years. While George's stipend had finally been increased, Ada continued her writing. She published her next serial, A Little Minx, in The Sydney Mail in 1885, and followed this with a novel about divorce titled Against the Rules published in The Australasian between 1885 and 1886.

In March 1886 Ada was admitted to hospital due to complications associated with her earlier miscarriage, with expectations that she may not survive the admission. She remained in hospital for three months before leaving against her doctor's advice; the admission had severely cut into the family's finances.

Ada published another volume of poetry, Unspoken Thoughts, anonymously in London the following year. The volume features a number of poems centred on loss and grief, as well as Ada's views on religion and marriage. The poems explored controversial and taboo themes, including the nature of God and what Ada saw as the hypocrisy of organised religion, and the topics of marital vows, prostitution, euthanasia, and suicide. She expressed solidarity with those excluded by mainstream society, and presented marriage and religious dogmas as constraints on spiritual freedom and expression. The volume was positively received but sold only 150 of the 500 copies. Ada withdrew the volume from publication for reasons that remain uncertain; she later refused to allow the more controversial poems from the collection to be reprinted.

Ada's next novel, A Marked Man, was serialised under the title A Black Sheep in 1888–1889 and then published in book form in London the following year; it was her first major financial success, earning her £197 (equivalent to $31,000 in 2022). The novel critiques organised religion and explores themes of social reform and conformity. Her next serial, A Woman's Friendship, appeared in The Age between August and October 1889. During this period Ada's fiction began to feature more frequent explorations of the New Woman and women's status in society, as well as the social norms surrounding marriage. Her writing also portrayed the clergy as snobbish and hypocritical, and frequently dealt with the theme of unhappy marriages.

By the early 1890s, Ada was a well-known and popular writer. She moved away from publishing serials in local newspapers and instead pursued international book publication, increasing her reputation as a writer both domestically and overseas. She wrote a new romance novel titled Not All in Vain, first serialised in The Australasian in 1890–1891 and then published in book form the following year. The publication of A Marked Man, The Three Miss Kings, and Not All in Vain between 1890 and 1892 cemented her reputation as one of Australia's leading writers.

==== Williamstown ====
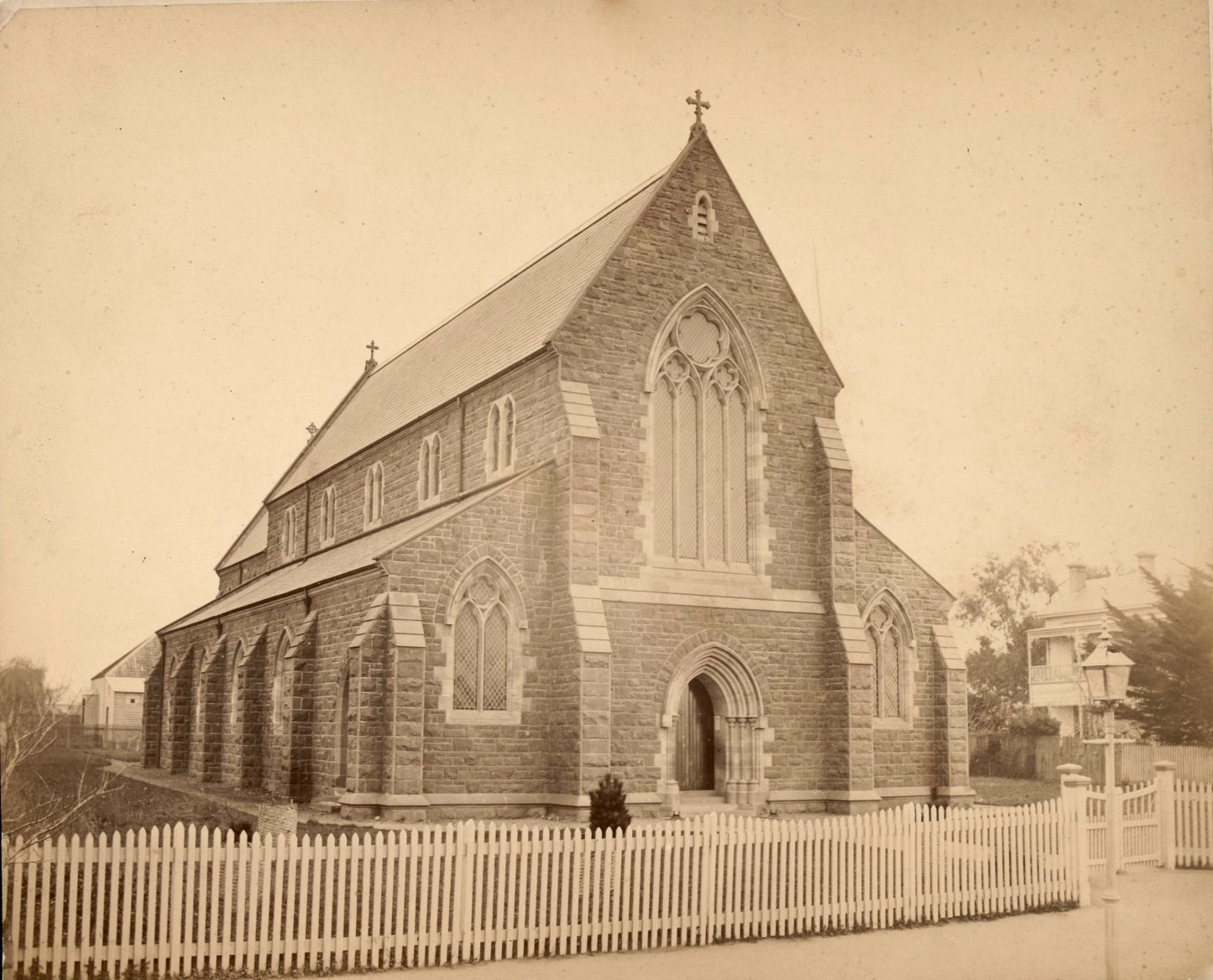
Holy Trinity Anglican Church in Williamstown

In October 1893 the family moved to Williamstown in Melbourne. Shortly after their move, the family began struggling financially as a result of Melbourne's 1890s economic depression, particularly because of their sons' expensive school fees. Ada published six books over the next five years: A Little Minx, A Marriage Ceremony, Fidelis, A Humble Enterprise, At Midnight and Other Stories, and Materfamilias. Three of these were based on serials she had previously published in newspapers. Unlike the majority of her novels, Fidelis and A Humble Enterprise explored the challenges of finding a suitable wife from a male perspective.

Ada began to write short stories for English periodicals, and in 1897 she published a collection of her short stories in book form. Her reputation as a writer continued to grow; in 1896 she was the subject of a chapter in the book Australian Writers by the critic Desmond Byrne, and in 1898 she was identified as one of Australia's two leading "poetesses" in the book The Development of Australian Literature. By 1897 she was earning around £1000 per year (equivalent to $172,000 in 2022) from her writing.

Ada's next two novels, Path and Goal and The Devastators, were published in 1900 and 1901. In 1902 Ada became the first president of a newly formed society of women writers, the Melbourne Writers' Club, which would eventually become the Lyceum Club. She also contracted with a publisher to write her memoir, Thirty Years in Australia. Over the following years, however, she suffered a series of personal tragedies; in 1902 her son Hugh died of typhoid fever at the age of 24, and in 1904 her son-in-law committed suicide, leaving Ada and George to support their daughter Vera and infant grandson. That year Ada confessed in a letter to the critic and editor Bertram Stevens that she was without any savings and that her finances had been strained by the need to provide for her daughter. She increased the pace of her writing, and by 1907 had published four new novels: Sisters, A Platonic Friendship, A Happy Marriage, and The Eternal Feminine.

Ada and George returned to England for six months in 1908 to settle the legal affairs associated with the inheritance of his sister's estate. While in England, Ada wrote essays for the Atlantic Monthly and the North American Review. In these essays, she wrote about ageing and her view of religious authority. She also wrote about the women's rights movement, characterising herself as a supporter of women's rights while suggesting that women had undermined their own cause and allowed themselves to be treated as inferior to men by acting immaturely. Ada and George returned to Australia at the beginning of 1909.

=== Later life and death ===
In December 1909, George retired from his ministry in Williamstown. The following year he spent six months acting as a substitute priest in Carrick, Tasmania; whether Ada accompanied him is unknown. The couple moved to England in 1912 and settled in Cambridge. There, Ada published three books: a reminiscence on her early life in England titled The Retrospect, a poetry collection titled The Hand in the Dark, and a novel titled The Making of Rachel Rowe. George died in February 1917, and Ada returned to Australia that August.

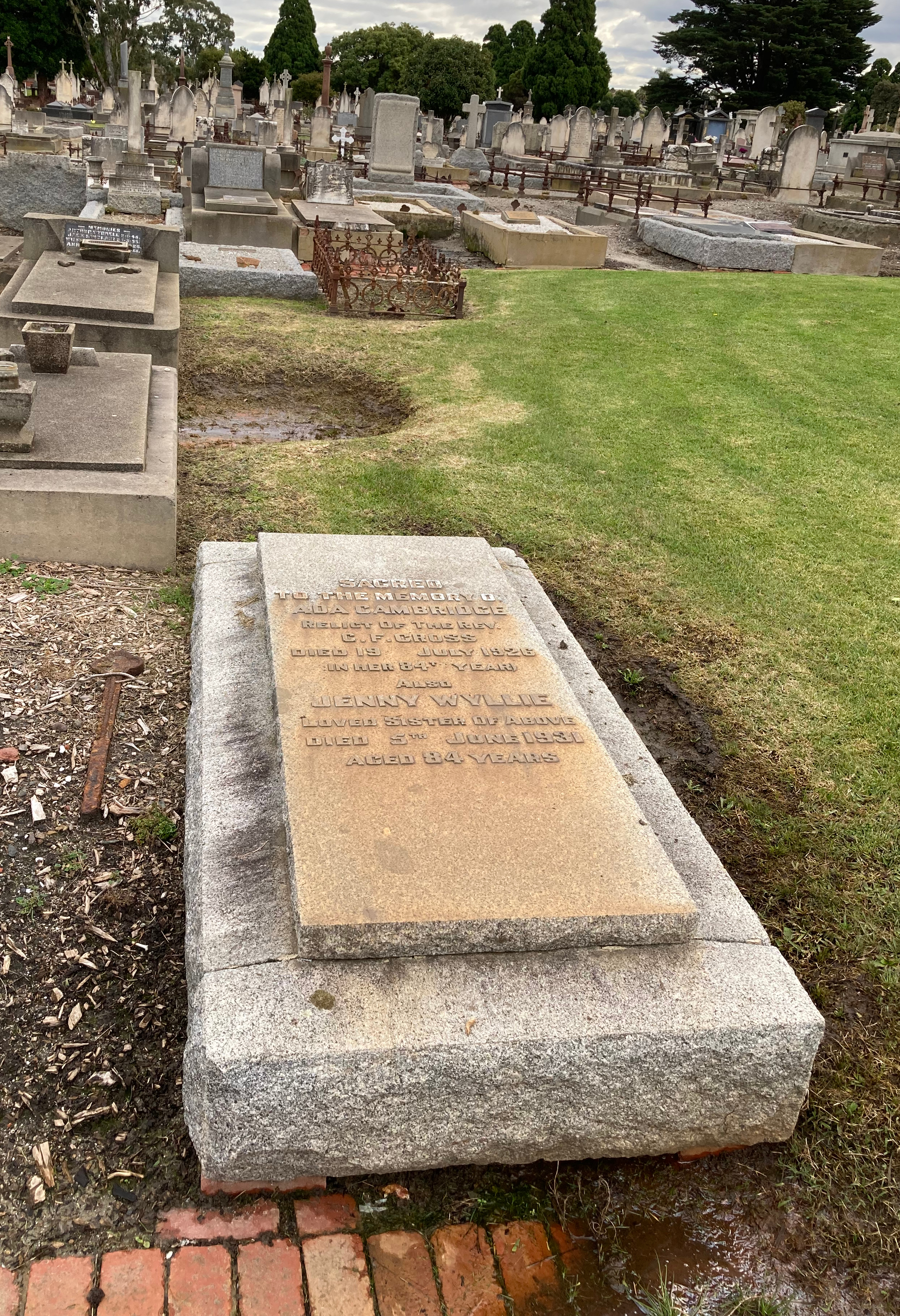
Cambridge's grave at Brighton General Cemetery

By this time Ada had become too frail to write substantial new works but she continued attempting to support herself independently. In 1919 she offered a volume of short stories (some of which were adapted from her previously published works) to the publisher Angus & Robertson, which declined the work. Ada suffered a stroke in 1921, and as she became increasingly lonely and ill, she developed a correspondence with the publisher George Robertson. She published her last essay, "Nightfall", in 1922, in which she described the "secret humiliations" of old age and wrote about her fear of becoming dependent on others' charity. Her final published work was likely a poem that she published for Anzac Day in the magazine Woman's World in April 1923.

While the serialised republication of her memoir Thirty Years in Australia had put her in a slightly more secure financial position, Ada remained concerned about her finances and pursued republication of her other works in her final years. She wrote in a 1923 letter to Robertson that she hoped to leave some money for her daughter, who was also struggling financially. She moved into a nursing home in 1924 and sold Robertson the rights to all of her writing for £100 (equivalent to $9,000 in 2022), which allowed her to remain at the nursing home until she was eventually forced to move to a private hospital. She suffered another stroke in 1926, leaving her blind and paralysed. She died in Elsternwick of heart failure on 19 July 1926 at the age of 82 and was buried at Brighton Cemetery.

== Writing ==
=== Fiction ===
Literary scholars have described Cambridge's novels as following a similar narrative formula: the majority involve a romance between a hero and a heroine, which typically ends in marriage. Along the way, the narrative creates barriers to their marital happiness, including misunderstandings, changes of heart, moral dilemmas, and illnesses. Cambridge's heroines were generally attractive, morally upstanding, upper-middle class young women with ladylike qualities. Her novels often explore the challenges of finding a suitable spouse and the expectations and pressures placed on both men and women in achieving a desirable marriage. Her writing was critical of the colonial nouveaux riches and the erosion of English values and standards, including reduced emphasis on one's manners and upbringing. The scholar Debra Adelaide writes that her novels express "the typical anxieties of the Anglo-Australian middle classes".

Scholars have argued, however, that Cambridge's writing often features techniques of irony and satire. For instance, her 1898 novel Materfamilias is narrated by a grandmother who gives a biased recounting of her life while remaining unaware of how her manipulative behaviour and self-delusion have evidently afflicted those around her. Her biographer Audrey Tate regards Materfamilias as one of Cambridge's best works, and writes that its usage of irony illustrates "how the domestic novel can be elevated to an art form". Cambridge sometimes adjusted her typical romantic narrative structure to subvert her readers' expectations. Many of her novels explore her disillusionment with religion and her views on marriage and the status of women, as well as her criticism of what she viewed as society's judgmental nature. Margaret Bradstock argues that Cambridge's later fiction demonstrates her maturation as a writer, displaying more thoughtful interrogation of social norms and more fluent literary experimentation.

Cambridge's fiction typically presented marriage as something that should be chosen freely. Her romances suggested, however, that true love was not necessarily an essential component of a successful marriage, and that even those who did not truly love their husbands could become dutiful and happy wives. Her novels suggested that young women might only find the capacity for true love as they matured despite initially marrying for reasons of money or social obligation. Some of her later works criticised the desire of younger women to pursue their own passions at the cost of their duty, and suggested that true happiness would only be found through marriage. Adelaide writes that Cambridge's writing features an "odd mixture of radicalism and conservatism", including the presence of social humanitarian themes alongside condemnation of socialism and an ambivalent position on women's rights.

=== Poetry ===
In addition to her two early volumes of hymns, Cambridge published three collections of poetry. Her first poetry collection, The Manor House and Other Poems, contains a mix of both religious and secular poems with Pre-Raphaelite influences. Her next volume of poetry, Unspoken Thoughts, proved controversial; it explores a range of anti-establishment themes including injustice, the nature of God, and sexual expression. The poems criticise how social structures, including marriage and religion, limit personal freedom. Scholars have pointed out that the volume was published the same year that Cambridge was admitted to hospital with expectations that she might not survive. Many of the poems from Unspoken Thoughts were included in her 1913 volume The Hand in the Dark. The scholar Patricia Barton describes The Hand in the Dark as a more measured and coherent exploration of the themes of Unspoken Thoughts, featuring a "calm strength and integrity" that contrasts with the "anguished questionings" of the "urgent, passionate, and contradictory" earlier collection.

While Cambridge's poetry was neglected for much of the 20th century, the literary historian H. M. Green praised her poetry in 1961 and compared her work to that of the poets Francis Adams and Bernard O'Dowd. Her poetry, particularly the collection Unspoken Thoughts, has since attracted greater attention from feminist scholars for themes that the scholar Jill Roe describes as "quasi-feminist". The poetry scholar Toby Davidson describes Cambridge as a pioneer of Christian mystical poetry in Australia, noting the theological and liturgical influences on her poetry.

== Legacy ==
Cambridge was a popular and well-regarded writer during her lifetime, and maintained her positive reputation after her death into the 1930s. She was one of the few Australian writers of her era to depict emotional and romantic relationships, and her works were particularly widely read by women. She was described during her lifetime as the leading Australian female novelist of her era, and was called the "doyen of women writers in Australia" upon her death. However, by the 1940s, her fiction was regarded more negatively. She was dismissed as an Anglophile whose writing was limited to exploring women's affairs. Tate summarises her reputation as being that of a "frail clergyman's wife writing romantic fiction of dubious value". This shift in her reputation has been attributed to the emergence of a nationalist Australian literary genre in the 1890s, which increasingly centred on tales of the bush and male heroism.

In the 1970s, a resurgence of interest in women's writing from feminist scholars led to a re-evaluation of Cambridge's work. One of the catalysts for this re-evaluation of her writing was a 1972 article by Roe, which sparked interest from other feminist literary scholars. Biographers and scholars began to describe Cambridge's writing as featuring more complexity, radicalism, and subversion than had previously been appreciated. They observed that her work frequently questioned and challenged the social structures of her era. Her biographers Margaret Bradstock and Louise Wakeling note her use of irony, as well as the anti-establishment sentiment and liberal humanist politics that feature in her writing. Several of her novels, as well as her memoir Thirty Years in Australia, were reprinted during the 1980s.

== Bibliography ==
Bibliography adapted from list of works compiled by Beilby & Hadgraft 1979:

Novels

- Up the Murray (The Australasian, 1875)
- My Guardian (Cassell's Family Magazine, 1876; as book, Cassell, 1878)
- In Two Years Time (The Australasian, 1879; as book, Bentley, 1879)
- Dinah (The Australasian, 1879–1880)
- A Mere Chance (The Australasian, 1880; as book, Bentley, 1882)
- Missed in the Crowd (The Australasian, 1881–1882)
- Across the Grain (The Australasian, 1882)
- The Three Miss Kings (The Australasian, 1883; as book, Heinemann, 1891)
- Mrs Carnegie's Husband (The Australasian, 1884–1885)
- Against the Rules (The Australasian, 1885–1886)
- A Marked Man (Heinemann, 1890)
- Not All in Vain (Heinemann, 1892)
- A Little Minx (Heinemann, 1893)
- A Marriage Ceremony (Heinemann, 1894)
- Fidelis (Hutchinson, 1895)
- A Humble Enterprise (Ward Lock, 1896)
- Materfamilias (Ward Lock, 1898)
- Path and Goal (Methuen, 1900)
- The Devastators (Methuen, 1901)
- Sisters (Hutchinson, 1904)
- A Platonic Friendship (Hurst & Blackett, 1905)
- A Happy Marriage (Hurst & Blackett, 1906)
- The Eternal Feminine (Hurst & Blackett, 1907)
- The Making of Rachel Rowe (Cassell, 1914)

Poetry collections

- Hymns on the Litany (J. H. & J. Parker, 1865)
- Hymns on the Holy Communion (Houlston & Wright, 1866)
- The Manor House and Other Poems (Daldy, 1875)
- Unspoken Thoughts (K. Paul, 1887)
- The Hand in the Dark and Other Poems (Heinemann, 1913)

Short story collections

- At Midnight and Other Stories (Ward Lock, 1897)

Autobiography

- Thirty Years in Australia (Methuen, 1903)
- The Retrospect (Stanley Paul, 1912)
