= Louise Mack =

Australian poet, journalist and novelist (1870–1935)

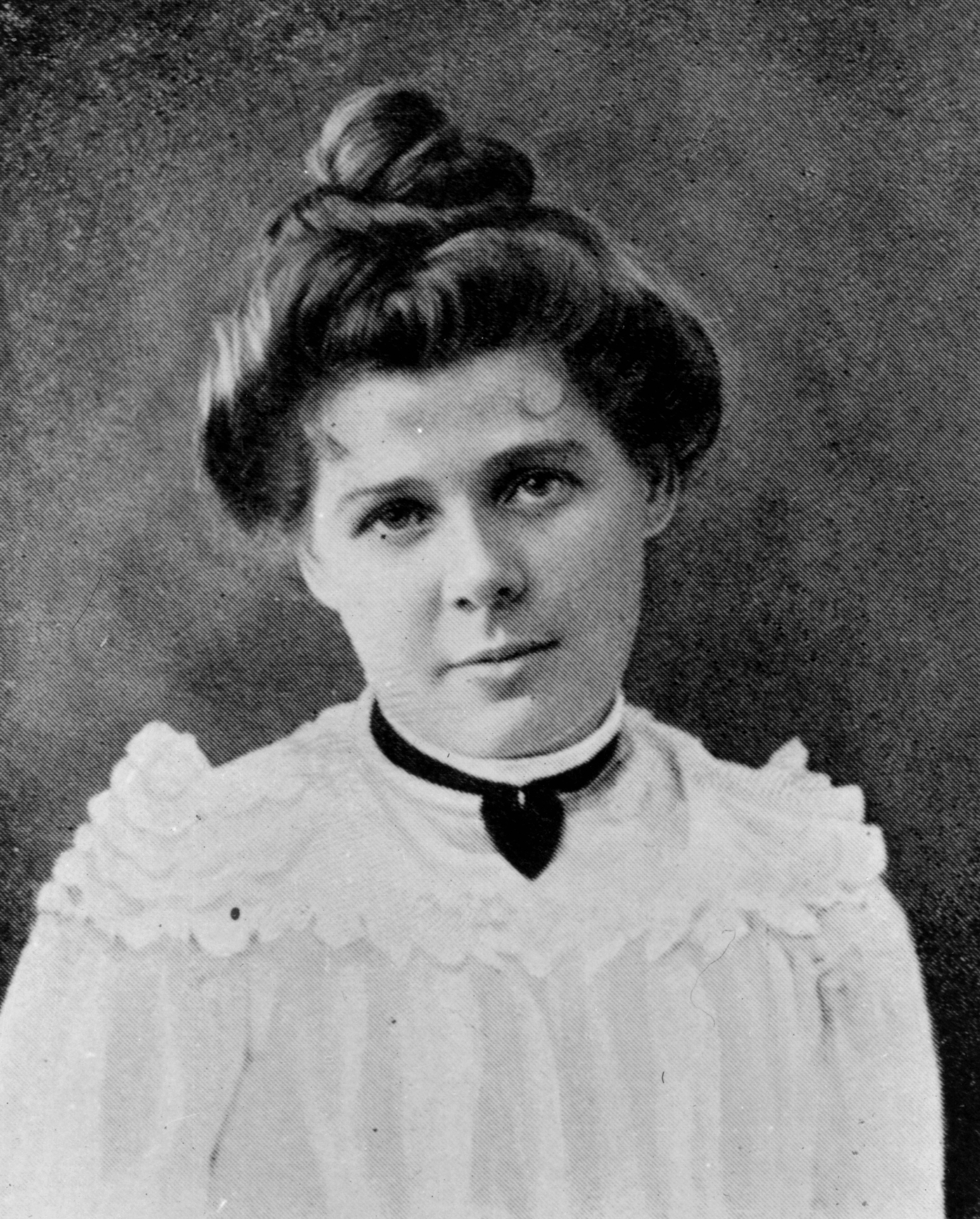
- Born: 10 October 1870; Hobart, Tasmania
- Died: 23 November 1935 (aged 65); Mosman, New South Wales, Australia
- Writing career
- Language: English
- Years active: 1893–1934

Marie Louise Hamilton Mack (10 October 1870 – 23 November 1935) was an Australian poet, journalist and novelist. She is most known for her writings and her involvement in World War I in 1914 as the first woman war correspondent in Belgium.

== Early life and education ==
Mack was born in Hobart, Tasmania. She was the seventh of thirteen children. Her father, Hans Hamilton Mack, was a Wesleyan minister who moved the family from state to state on account of his work. By the time she was ready for secondary school, the family had taken up residence in Sydney. Mack attended Sydney Girls High School where she met Ethel Turner.

== Career ==
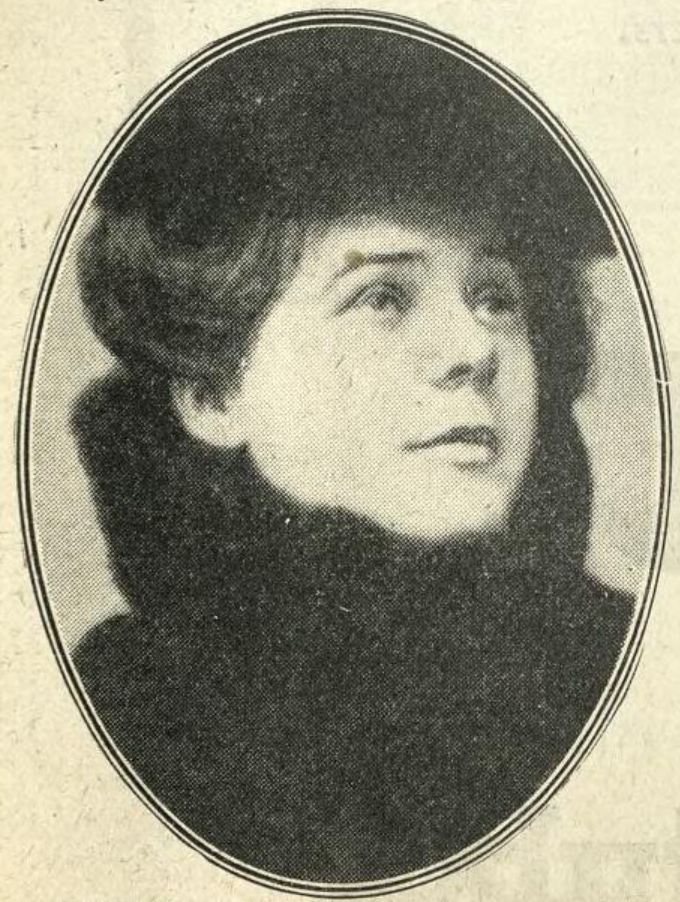
Louise Mack, of The Bulletin's A Woman's Letter

From 1898 until 1901, Mack wrote "A Woman's Letter" for The Bulletin. Her first novel was published in 1896 and her only collection of poetry in 1901. Following this she travelled to England and Europe and did not return to Australia until 1916.

Mack wrote sixteen novels over nearly 40 years. The Spectator wrote in 1903 about her third novel, Girls Together, a companion piece to Teens: A Story of Australian School Girls, that "the narrative is distinctly interesting. The study of character is excellent".

=== War correspondent ===
In 1914, when war broke out Louise Mack was in Belgium where she continued to work as the first woman war correspondent for the Evening News and the London Daily Mail. Her eye-witness account of the German invasion of Antwerp and her adventures—A Woman's Experiences in the Great War—was published in 1915.

She was not only the first woman to be a war correspondent but she was also the first Australian to study the Germans this closely during this time. She was under shell-fire for thirty-six hours in Antwerp, and at one point went right through German lines to the city of Brussels.

=== Returning to Australia ===
Returning to Australia in 1916, Mack gave a series of lectures about her war experiences. She frequently wrote for The Sydney Morning Herald, the Bulletin and other newspapers and magazines. While back in Australia, in 1917–1918, she used her lectures on her war experiences to raise money for the Australian Red Cross Society.

On a visit to New Zealand in 1920, Mack and two others went missing for three days while mountain climbing in the Tararua Range, Otaki. When found, she was suffering from hunger and mountain sickness.

In the 1930s, she wrote a series of humorous but helpful articles for the Australian Women's Weekly, titled "Louise Mack advises".

== Personal ==
On 8 January 1896, Mack married Dublin barrister John Percy Creed, who died in 1914. On 1 September 1924, she married 33-year-old New Zealander Allen Illingworth Leyland (d. 1932). He was an ANZAC who had survived Gallipoli and subsequently in France, where he had been gassed.

Mack died in Mosman, New South Wales on 23 November 1935.

== Bibliography ==
=== Novels ===
- The World is Round (1896)
- Teens: A Story of Australian School Girls (1897)
- Girls Together (1898)
- An Australian Girl in London (1902)
- Children of the Sun (1904)
- The Red Rose of a Summer (1909)
- Theodora's Husband (1909)
- In a White Palace (1910)
- The Romance of a Woman of Thirty (1911)
- Wife to Peter (1911)
- Attraction (1913)
- The Marriage of Edward (1913)
- The House of Daffodils (1914)
- The Music Makers: the love story of a woman composer (1914)
- Teens Triumphant (1933)
- Maiden's Prayer (1934)

=== Poetry collection ===
- Dreams in Flower (1901)

=== Individual poems ===
- "Manly Lagoon" (1893)
- "Of a Wild White Bird" (1895)
- "An Easter Song" (1897)
- "Before Exile" (1901)
- "To Sydney" (1901)

=== Autobiography ===
- A Woman's Experiences in the Great War (1915)
