= Wanderer =

Wanderer, Wanderers, or The Wanderer may refer to:

== Arts and entertainment ==
=== Film, television, and radio ===
- The Wanderer (1913 film), a silent film
- The Wanderer (1925 film), a silent film directed by Raoul Walsh
- The Wanderers (1956 film), an Italian drama film directed by Hugo Fregonese
- The Wanderer (1967 film), a French film directed by Jean-Gabriel Albicocco
- The Wanderers (1973 film), a Japanese film directed by Kon Ichikawa
- The Wanderers (1979 film), an American film directed by Philip Kaufman
- The Wanderer (2009 film), a 2009 Israeli film
- Wanderers (2014 film), a Swedish science fiction short film
- The Wanderer (TV series), a 1994 British television series starring Bryan Brown
- The Wanderer (audio drama), a 2012 Doctor Who audio drama

=== Literature ===
==== Novels ====
- The Wanderer (Burney novel), 1814, by Frances Burney
- The Wanderer (Creech novel), 2000, by Sharon Creech
- The Wanderer (Edwards novel), a 1953 children's novel by Monica Edwards
- The Wanderer or Le Grand Meaulnes, a 1913 novel by Henri-Alban Fournier under the pen name Alain-Fournier
- The Wanderers, a 2017 novel by Meg Howrey
- The Wanderer (Leiber novel), 1964, by Fritz Leiber
- The Wanderers (Price novel), 1974, by Richard Price
- The Wanderers (Rimland novel), 1977, by Ingrid Rimland
- Wanderer, a 1985 science fiction novel by Dennis Schmidt
- The Wanderers (Shishkov novel), 1931, by Vyacheslav Shishkov
- The Wanderer, an 1831–32 novel by Alexander Veltman
- The Wanderer (Waltari novel), 1949, by Mika Waltari
- Wanderers (novel), a 2019 dystopian science fiction novel by Chuck Wendig
- The Wanderer, a 2004 novel by Cherry Wilder and Katya Reimann

==== Poems ====
- "The Wanderer" (Old English poem), an anonymous poem preserved in the Exeter Book
- "The Wanderer", a 1726 poem by Richard Savage
- "The Wanderer" (Maykov poem), 1867, by Apollon Maykov
- "The Wanderer", a 1913 poem by Christopher Brennan
- "The Wanderer", a 1921 poem by Henry Lane Eno
- "The Wanderer", a poem by John Masefield

==== Other literature ====
- Wanderers, a 1909 collection by Knut Hamsun
- The Wanderer, a 1932 collection of parables by Kahlil Gibran
- Wanderers (comics), a DC Comics series
- The Wanderer (manga), a manga by Narumi Kakinouchi

=== Music ===
==== Albums ====
- The Wanderer (Donna Summer album), 1980
- The Wanderer (Kevin Rowland album), 1988
- The Wanderer (O.A.R. album), 1997
- The Wanderer, a 2001 album by Karunesh
- The Wanderer (Holy Blood album), 2002
- Wanderer, a 2011 album by Adrian von Ziegler
- Wanderer (Heaven Shall Burn album), 2016
- Wanderer (Cara Dillon album), 2017
- Wanderer (Cat Power album), 2018
- Wanderer (Ruth Moody album), 2024
- Wanderers (album), a 2019 album by Visions of Atlantis

==== Classical works ====
- Der Wanderer (D 489), an 1816 song by Franz Schubert
- Wanderer Fantasy, an 1822 piano fantasy by Franz Schubert
- "Der Wanderer", a song by Pascal Dusapin setting a poem by Friedrich Nietzsche
- "Der Wanderer", a work for male chorus and piano by Philippe Hersant
- "Der Wanderer", a song by Anselm Hüttenbrenner
- "Der Wanderer", a song by Robert Schumann
- "The Wanderer", a song by Modest Mussorgsky
- The Wanderer, a 2005 a cappella work by Ezequiel Viñao
- "The Wanderer" or "Po dikim stepyam Zabaikalya", a Russian folk song

==== Songs ====
- "The Wanderer" (Dion song), 1961
- "The Wanderer" (Donna Summer song), 1980
- "The Wanderer" (U2 song), a 1993 song featuring Johnny Cash
- "The Wanderer", a 1997 song by Emperor from Anthems to the Welkin at Dusk
- "Wanderer", a 2007 song by Ensiferum from Victory Songs
- "The Wanderer", a 2013 song by Amorphis from Circle
- "Wanderer", a 2016 song by Amon Amarth from Jomsviking
- "Wanderer", a 2016 song by Shade Empire from Poetry of the Ill-Minded
- "The Wanderer", a 2019 song by Kate Rusby from Philosophers, Poets & Kings
- "The Happy Wanderer", the English title of a post-World War II German song

==== Other uses in music ====
- The Wanderers (band), a British punk band formed in 1981 by Stiv Bators
- The Wanderer Tour, a 1981 concert tour by Donna Summer

=== Theater ===
- The Wanderer (musical), a 2022 musical based on the life of Dion DiMucci

=== Video games ===
- Wanderer (video game), a 1986 game

=== Visual art ===
- The Wanderer (painting), a 1943 painting by George Grosz
- Wanderers, an alternative name for the Peredvizhniki, a group of 19th-century Russian realist painters

=== Fictional characters ===
- The Wanderer, the god Wotan in Richard Wagner's opera Siegfried
- The Wanderers (Russian: Странники, romanized: Stranniki), a mysterious race in the Strugatsky brothers' Noon Universe
- Wanderer, in the 2011 South Korean animated film Leafie, A Hen into the Wild
- The Wanderer, in the Canadian television series Lost Girl
- Wanderer (Genshin Impact), in the video game Genshin Impact
- The Wanderer, the player character of the 2023 video game Diablo IV

== Butterflies ==
- Bematistes aganice, the wanderer, a species of tropical Africa
- Monarch butterfly (Danaus plexippus), also called the wanderer, a species of the Americas
- Various species of the genus Pareronia of tropical Asia

== People ==
- Georg Wilhelm Wanderer, German portrait painter
- The Wanderer (criminal) (1958–2018), nickname of Norwegian burglar Terje Larsen
- The Wanderer, an online screen name used by Timothy McVeigh
- The Wanderer, an alternative name for the Wandering Jew of legend

== Ships ==
- HMS Wanderer, several ships of the British Royal Navy
- USS Wanderer, several US Navy ships
- Pearson Wanderer, a 30-foot sailboat designed by Bill Shaw
- Wanderer (sailing dinghy), a 14-foot sailing dinghy designed by Ian Proctor
- Wanderer (slave ship), a yacht that illegally landed about 400 enslaved Africans from the Congo River on Jekyll Island, Georgia, in 1858
- Wanderer (1865), an Oldenburg brigantine lost without trace in 1885 on a voyage from Mexico to Falmouth
- Wanderer (1878), a steam yacht that later became HMS Sealark
- Wanderer (1879), the last whaling ship built in Mattapoisett, Massachusetts, and the namesake of The Wanderer
- Wanderer (1891), a four-masted steel barque that inspired John Masefield's poem of the same name
- Wanderer (1893), a San Francisco pilot boat bought by Sterling Hayden and used for his voyage to Tahiti
- Wanderer, a 16-foot Wayfarer dinghy sailed by travel writer Frank Dye

== Sports ==
=== Venues ===
- Old Wanderers, a former cricket ground in Johannesburg, South Africa, closed in 1946 and subsequently replaced by the Wanderers Stadium
- Sharjah Wanderers, a sports club and grounds in Sharjah, United Arab Emirates
- Wanderers Cricket Ground, a cricket ground in Windhoek, Namibia
- Wanderers Grounds, a playing ground in Halifax, Nova Scotia, Canada
- Wanderers Stadium, a cricket ground in Johannesburg, South Africa, which replaced Old Wanderers in 1956

=== Teams ===
==== Australia ====
- Wanderers Football Club, Marrara, Northern Territory
- Western Sydney Wanderers FC
- Western Sydney Wanderers FC (W-League)

==== Barbados ====
- Wanderers Cricket Club

==== Brazil ====
- Scottish Wanderers Football Club

==== Canada ====
- Ajax Wanderers R.U.F.C.
- Castaway Wanderers RFC
- HFX Wanderers FC
- Montreal Wanderers
- Montreal Wanderers RFC
- Wanderers Amateur Athletic Club

==== Chile ====
- Santiago Wanderers

==== Eswatini ====
- Manzini Wanderers F.C.

==== Ireland ====
- Ballyboden Wanderers GAA
- Bray Wanderers F.C.
- Pembroke Wanderers Hockey Club
- Wanderers F.C. (rugby union), a rugby union club based in Dublin
- Wexford Wanderers RFC

==== Malawi ====
- Mighty Wanderers FC

==== Malaysia ====
- NS Wanderers RC

==== Malta ====
- S.K. Victoria Wanderers F.C.
- Sliema Wanderers F.C.

==== Mauritius ====
- Arsenal Wanderers

==== New Zealand ====
- Cashmere Wanderers
- Hamilton Wanderers AFC
- Havelock North Wanderers AFC

==== South Africa ====
- African Wanderers F.C.

==== United Kingdom ====
===== England =====
- Birkenhead Wanderers
- Bolton Wanderers F.C.
- Burton Park Wanderers F.C.
- Burton Wanderers F.C.
- Cray Wanderers F.C.
- Dorking Wanderers F.C.
- Ipswich Wanderers F.C.
- Moseley Wanderers
- Old Hill Wanderers F.C.
- Public School Wanderers
- Shropshire Wanderers F.C.
- Sudbury Wanderers F.C.
- Wanderers F.C., winners of the first FA Cup in 1872
- Warstones Wanderers F.C.
- Wolverhampton Wanderers F.C.
- Wolverhampton Wanderers W.F.C.
- Woolpack Wanderers F.C.
- Wycombe Wanderers F.C.

===== Scotland =====
- Aberdeen Wanderers RFC
- Dundee Wanderers F.C.
- Forth Wanderers F.C.
- Greenock Wanderers RFC
- Murrayfield Wanderers RFC
- Nithsdale Wanderers F.C.
- St Cuthbert Wanderers F.C.

===== Wales =====
- Glamorgan Wanderers RFC
- Llanelli Wanderers RFC

==== United States ====
- Brooklyn Wanderers
- Grafton Wanderers

==== Uruguay ====
- Montevideo Wanderers F.C.

==== Zambia ====
- Mufulira Wanderers F.C.

== Other uses ==
- Los Errantes (The Wanderers), a Spanish anarchist militant group
- The Wanderer (Massachusetts newspaper), an American weekly newspaper
- The Wanderer (Roman Catholic newspaper), an American Catholic national weekly based in Minnesota
- Wanderer, the 1963 autobiography by Sterling Hayden
- Wanderer (AROS), a desktop environment based on the Zune widget toolkit
- Wanderer (company), a German automobile manufacturer, constituent of Auto Union
- Wanderers, adherents of Russian wandering, a religious tradition
- World Wide Web Wanderer, an early web crawler

== See also ==
- Wander (disambiguation)
- Wandering (disambiguation)
