= 1897 in Australian literature =

This article presents a list of the historical events and publications of Australian literature during 1897.

== Books ==
- Guy Boothby
  - The Fascination of the King
  - The Lust of Hate
  - A Prince of Swindlers
  - Sheilah McLeod: A Heroine of the Back Blocks
- Mary Gaunt – Kirkham's Find
- Louise Mack – Teens : A Story of Australian School Girls
- Rosa Praed – Nulma
- Roderic Quinn – Mostyn Stayne

== Short stories ==
- Louis Becke – Pacific Tales
- Guy Boothby – "With Three Phantoms"
- Ada Cambridge – At Midnight and Other Stories
- Henry Lawson
  - "Mr Smellingscheck"
  - "Two Larrikins"
- A. B. Paterson – "Bill and Jim Nearly Get Taken Down"
- Steele Rudd
  - "Dave's Snake-Bite"
  - "Jack or Cranky Jack"
  - "A Kangaroo Hunt from Shingle Hut"
  - "The Parson and the Scone"

== Poetry ==
- Barcroft Boake – Where the Dead Men Lie, and Other Poems
- E. J. Brady – "The Whaler's Pig"
- Christopher Brennan – XXI Poems 1893-1897 : Towards the Source
- Victor J. Daley – "A Treat for the London Poor"
- J. Le Gay Brereton – Sweetheart Mine: Lyrics of Love and Friendship
- John Farrell – "Australia to England"
- W. T. Goodge
  - "The Great Australian Adjective"
  - "The Oozlum Bird"
- Henry Lawson
  - "The Lights of Cobb and Co."
  - "The Old Bark School"
  - "The Star of Australasia"
- Ethel Mills – "The Brumby's Death"
- Breaker Morant – "Who's Riding Old Harlequin Now?"
- Will H. Ogilvie
  - "Off the Grass"
  - "The Stockyard Liar"
- A. B. Paterson
  - "The Ballad of the Calliope"
  - "By the Grey Gulf-Water"
  - "Saltbush Bill's Second Fight"
- Charles Thatcher – "Look Out Below!"
- Ethel Turner – "Orphaned by the Sea"
- Dora Wilcox – "After the Floods"

== Drama ==
- Alfred Dampier – Fortune's Fool

== Births ==
A list, ordered by date of birth (and, if the date is either unspecified or repeated, ordered alphabetically by surname) of births in 1897 of Australian literary figures, authors of written works or literature-related individuals follows, including year of death.

- 10 January – Margaret Fane, novelist and poet (died 1962)
- 23 February – J. M. Walsh novelist (died 1952)
- 16 March – Flora Eldershaw, novelist (died 1956)
- 9 April – Dale Collins, journalist and novelist (died 1956)
- 16 August – Marjorie Barnard, novelist (died 1987)

Unknown date

- Winifred Birkett, novelist and poet (died 1975)

== Deaths ==
A list, ordered by date of death (and, if the date is either unspecified or repeated, ordered alphabetically by surname) of deaths in 1897 of Australian literary figures, authors of written works or literature-related individuals follows, including year of birth.

- 22 December – William Gay, poet (born 1865 in Australian literature)

== See also ==
- 1897 in Australia
- 1897 in literature
- 1897 in poetry
- List of years in Australian literature
- List of years in literature
