= Intoxicate O.S. =

Studio album by Shade Empire
- Released: May 24, 2006
- Recorded: January–March 2006
- Genres: Melodic black metal, symphonic black metal, industrial metal
- Length: 41:38
- Label: Dynamic Arts Records
- Producer: S. Jämsén

Shade Empire chronology
Sinthetic (2004)	Intoxicate O.S. (2006)	Zero Nexus (2008)

Intoxicate O.S. is the second full-length album by the Finnish metal band Shade Empire. The album was recorded at Studio Perkele in Finland.

Intoxicate O.S. is the first Shade Empire album to include a video, "Chemical God." The video was banned from MTV due to some rapid flickering scenes that might induce epileptic seizures. "Slitwrist Ecstasy" had been released on a two-track single two weeks prior to the release of Intoxicate O.S.

The album turned out to be decently successful commercially, since it reached number 25 in weekly Finnish album sales, as stated at FinnishCharts.

Norway's Scream Magazine gave a rating of 4 out of 6, stating that the band "way too often walk along the beaten path".

== Track listing ==
1. "Slitwrist Ecstasy" – 3:26
2. "Bloodstar" – 4:58
3. "Chemical God" – 5:13
4. "Rat in a Maze" – 4:05
5. "Soulslayers" – 6:01
6. "Silver Fix" – 4:05
7. "Embrace the Gods of Suffering" – 4:17
8. "Ravine" – 2:50
9. "Hatefeast" – 5:05

== Credits ==
- Juha Harju – vocals
- Janne Niiranen – guitars
- Juha Sirkkiä – guitars
- Olli Savolainen – synthesizer
- Eero Mantere – bass guitar
- Antti Makkonen – drums
- Hylzy Hyvärinen – clean vocals
- Mixed by S. Jämsén
- Mastered by Minerva Pappi at Finnvox Studios

Video "Chemical God" directed by Ari Reinikainen Lights engineered by Jussi Kotka
Artwork & layout Jarno Lahti Band Photos by Maria K.
