= USS Wanderer =

USS Wanderer is a name used more than once by the United States Navy:

- USS Wanderer (1857), a schooner and former slave trader seized by the Navy and in service from 1861 to 1865 during the American Civil War.
- USS Wanderer (SP-2440), a motor boat in commission as a patrol vessel from 1917 to 1918
- USS Wanderer (SP-132), a steam yacht built in 1897 and in commissioned Navy service as a patrol vessel from 1917 to 1919

== See also ==
- Wanderer (slave ship), the main article about the history of USS Wanderer (1857) as a slave ship before her United States Navy service
