= Zero Nexus =

Studio album by Shade Empire
- Released: March 12, 2008
- Genre: Melodic black metal, symphonic black metal, industrial metal
- Length: 44:40
- Label: Dynamic Arts
- Producer: Shade Empire and Tero Holopainen

Shade Empire chronology
Intoxicate O.S. (2006)	Zero Nexus (2008)	Omega Arcane (2013)

Zero Nexus is the third studio album by the Finnish metal band Shade Empire. It was released on March 12, 2008, by Dynamic Arts Records.

== Track listing ==
1. "9 in 1" – 4:38
2. "Adam & Eve" – 4:21
3. "Blood Colours the White" – 4:15
4. "Flesh Relinquished" – 4:49
5. "Harvesters of Death" – 3:59
6. "Serpent-Angel" – 4:33
7. "Whisper from the Depths" – 4:22
8. "Ecstasy of Black Light" – 4:11
9. "Victory" – 9:32

== Personnel ==
Band members

- Juha Harju – vocals
- Janne Niiranen – guitar
- Juha Sirkkiä – guitar
- Eero Mantere – bass guitar
- Rasane – drums
- Olli Savolainen – synthesizer

Additional credits

- Female vocals by Petra Lisitsin
- Tenor vocals by Jorma Koponen
- Male speech on track 9 by Graham Wilson
- Saxophone played by Aku Kolari
