= Omega Arcane =

Studio album by Shade Empire
- Released: 6 May 2013
- Genre: Melodic death metal, symphonic black metal, industrial metal
- Length: 74:26
- Label: Candlelight

Shade Empire chronology
Zero Nexus (2008)	Omega Arcane (2013)	Poetry of the Ill-Minded (2017)

Omega Arcane is the fourth studio album by the Finnish metal band Shade Empire. It was released on 6 May 2013 by Candlelight Records.

== Track listing ==
1. "Ruins" – 8:03
2. "Dawnless Days" – 5:23
3. "Until No Life Breeds" – 4:42
4. "Ash Statues" – 5:00
5. "Disembodiment" – 12:59
6. "Malicious Winds" – 5:20
7. "Traveler of Unlight" – 4:47
8. "Devolution" – 2:38
9. "Slumbering Giant" – 6:29
10. "Nomad" – 6:46
11. "Omega Arcane" – 12:13

== Personnel ==
Band members

- Juha Harju – vocals
- Janne Niiranen – guitars
- Juha Sirkkiä – guitars
- Olli Savolainen – synthesizer
- Eero Mantere – bass guitar
- Erno Räsänen – drums

Additional credits

- Petra Lisitsin – female vocals
