= Sinthetic =

Studio album by Shade Empire
- Released: March 3, 2004
- Recorded: 2003
- Genre: Melodic black metal, symphonic black metal, industrial metal
- Length: 41:38
- Label: Avantgarde
- Producer: Sami Jämsén

Shade Empire chronology
Essence of Pain (2002)	Sinthetic (2004)	Intoxicate O.S. (2006)

Sinthetic is the debut album by the Finnish metal band Shade Empire. The ninth track, "End of Dreams", is not listed in the CD, it can be regarded as a bonus or simply an outro.

== Track listing ==
1. "Conjuration" – 4:50
2. "Pain & Pleasure" – 5:23
3. "Human Sculpture" (feat. Marko Hietala) – 4:57
4. "Designed for Blood" (feat. Spellgoth) – 6:00
5. "Creation of Death" – 4:28
6. "Ja pimeys laskeutui" ("And Darkness Descended") – 3:21
7. "Extreme Form of Hatred" – 4:20
8. "Demonized" – 5:46
9. "End of Dreams" (hidden outro) – 2:33

== Credits ==
- Juha Harju – vocal, lyrics
- Janne Niiranen – guitar
- Juha Sirkkiä – guitar
- Olli Savolainen – synthesizers
- Eero Mantere – bass guitar
- Antti Makkonen – drums
- Marko Hietala – clean Vocals (on "Human Sculpture")
- Engineered by Sami Jämsén
- Mastered by Minerva Pappi at Finnvox Studios
- Artwork by Alan S. Smith
