= 1897 in poetry =

This article covers 1897 in poetry. Nationality words link to articles with information on the nation's poetry or literature (for instance, Irish or France).

== Works published in English ==
=== Canada ===
- Jean Blewett, Heart Songs
- Bliss Carman, Ballads of Lost Haven: A Book of the Sea, Canadian author published in the United States
- William Henry Drummond, The Habitant and Other French-Canadian Poems, employing dialect
- Frederick George Scott, The Unnamed Lake and Other Poems

=== United Kingdom ===
- Alfred Austin, The Conversion of Winkelmann, and Other Poems
- Hilaire Belloc, More Beasts (for Worse Children) (see The Bad Child's Book of Beasts 1896)
- Mary Elizabeth Coleridge, publishing under the pen name "Anodos", Fancy's guerdon (see also Fancy's Following 1896)
- Olive Custance, Opals
- John Davidson, New Ballads
- Ernest Dowson, The Pierrot of the Minute: A dramatic phantasy
- Lionel Johnson, Ireland, with Other Poems
- Henry Newbolt, Admirals All, and Other Verses, including "Vitaï Lampada", and "Drake's Drum" (first published in the St. John's Gazette 1896)
- George William Russell, publishing under the pen name "Æ", The Earth Breath, and Other Poems
- Dora Sigerson, The Fairy Changeling, and Other Poems
- Arthur Symons, Amoris Victima
- Francis Thompson, New Poems
- Theodore Watts-Dunton, The Coming of Love

=== United States ===
- Richard Maurice Burke, Walt Whitman: Man and Poet, nonfiction
- Bliss Carman, Ballads of Lost Haven: A Book of the Sea, Canadian author published in the United States
- James Whitcomb Riley, Neighborly Poems
- Edwin Arlington Robinson, The Children of the Night, including "Reuben Bright"
- John B. Tabb, Lyrics
- Yone Noguchi, Seen and Unseen, or, Monologues of a Homeless Snail and The Voice of the Valley

=== Other in English ===
- Barcroft Boake (suicide 1892), Where the Dead Men Lie, and Other Poems, Australia
- John Le Gay Brereton, Sweetheart Mine: Lyrics of Love and Friendship, Australia
- G. Sigerson, editor and translator from Gaelic, Bards of Gael and Gall, Ireland
- Isaac Tambyah, editor, A Garland of Ceylon Verse 1837-1897, Colombo: Ceylon Printing Works, 132 pages; anthology; Indian poetry in English

== Works published in other languages ==
=== France ===
- Francis Jammes, La Naissance du poète ("The Birth of the Poet")
- Stéphane Mallarmé:
  - Divagations
  - Un Coup de dés jamais n'abolira le hasard ("A Throw of the Dice will Never Abolish Chance") is published in Cosmopolis magazine (not published in book form until 1914)
- Edmond Rostand, Cyrano de Bergerac, a verse drama

=== Other languages ===
- Stefan George, Das Jahr der Seele ("The Year of the Soul"); German

== Births ==
- August 11 – Louise Bogan (died 1970), American poet and critic; wife of Raymond Holden
- May 5 – Kenneth Burke (died 1993), major American literary theorist and philosopher
- October 10 – Shigeji Tsuboi 壺井繁治 (died 1975), Japanese poet (surname: Tsuboi)
- November 7 – Ruth Pitter (died 1992), English poet and decorative painter (born Emma Thomas Pitter)
- November 11 – Nima Yooshij (died 1960), Persian poet
- November 15 – Sir Sacheverell Sitwell (died 1988), English writer, best known as an art critic and writer on architecture, particularly the baroque; younger brother of Dame Edith Sitwell and Sir Osbert Sitwell
- John Ferrar Holms (died 1934), British critic

== Deaths ==
Birth years link to the corresponding "[year] in poetry" article:

- May 4 — Isabella Banks (born 1821), English poet and novelist
- July 20 — Jean Ingelow (born 1829), English poet and novelist
- September 14 — James Joseph Sylvester (born 1814), English mathematician who translated poetry from the original French, German, Italian, Latin and Greek; author of The Laws of Verse, in which he attempted to codify a set of laws for prosody in poetry
- December 22 – William Gay (born 1865), Scots-born Australian poet
- date not known – Velutteri Keshavan Vaidyar (born 1839), Indian, Malayalam-language poet

== See also ==
- 19th century in poetry
- 19th century in literature
- List of years in poetry
- List of years in literature
- Victorian literature
- French literature of the 19th century
- Symbolist poetry
- Young Poland (Młoda Polska) a modernist period in Polish arts and literature, roughly from 1890 to 1918
- Poetry
