= Never Never (Australian outback) =

Remote area in the Australian Outback

Coordinates: 21°13′30.50″S 133°36′23.38″E

The Never Never is the name of a vast, remote area of the Australian Outback, as described in Barcroft Boake's poem "Where the Dead Men Lie":

Out on the wastes of the Never Never -
That's where the dead men lie!
There where the heat-waves dance forever -
That's where the dead men lie!

One reference earlier than Barcroft Boake's is The Never Never Land: a Ride in North Queensland (1884) by Archibald William Stirling so it is probable the term was in general use in at least the second half of the nineteenth century.

Life in the Never Never of the Northern Territory was described by Jeannie Gunn in two books including the classic 1908 Australian novel We of the Never Never.

Australian author Rosa Praed wrote the 1915 novel Lady Bridget in the Never-Never Land.

The slogan "You’ll Never Never Know, If You Never Never Go" was used in the 1990s for a TV advertising campaign featuring Daryl Somers for promoting tourism to the Northern Territory to people in other parts of Australia.

The term was also used several times throughout the 2008 Baz Luhrmann film Australia.

Midnight Oil allude to the Never Never in their song "Now or Never Land" on the album Earth and Sun and Moon.

== See also ==
- Outback Terminology
