= XXI Poems 1893-1897 : Towards the Source =

1897 poetry collection by Christopher Brennan

- Author: Christopher Brennan
- Language: English
- Genre: Poetry collection
- Publisher: Angus & Robertson
- Publication date: 1897
- Publication place: Australia
- Media type: Print
- Pages: 39 pp.

XXI Poems 1893-1897 : Towards the Source is a collection of poetry by Australian writer Christopher Brennan, published by Angus and Robertson in 1897.

The collection was originally published as a 200 copy-limited edition.

It contains 21 poems, with the bulk of the poems being published here for the first time.

== Contents ==
All of the poems in the original edition were untitled. The titles provided here come from later publications.

- "First Nocturn (Northern)"
- "Towards the Source : 1894-97: 2"
- "Second Nocturn (Tropic)"
- "Bells"
- "Aubade"
- "Fatum"
- "Towards the Source : 1894-97 : 4"
- "Towards the Source : 1894-97 : 5"
- "Towards the Source : 1894-97 : 6"
- "Towards the Source : 1894-97 : 7"
- "Towards the Source : 1894-97 : I : 10"
- "Towards the Source : 1894-97 : II : 11"
- "Towards the Source : 1894-97 : III : 12"
- "Towards the Source : 1894-97 : 16"
- "Towards the Source : 1894-97 : 17"
- "Towards the Source : 1894-97 : 18"
- "Towards the Source : 1894-97 : 19"
- "Towards the Source : 1894-97 : 20"
- "The Forest of Night : 1898-1902 : The Twilight of Disquietude : 37"
- "Towards the Source : 1894-97 : 27"
- "Towards the Source : 1894-97 : 13"

== Critical reception ==
A reviewer in Freeman's Journal noted that Brennan's work "is so very much above the average that of it we cannot but express the heartiest praise." They also commented that it "contains many quaint and fanciful conceits and dim allegories under lyrical guises."

== Note ==
- You can read a digitised version of the collection from the State Library of NSW.

== See also ==
- 1897 in Australian literature
