= Towards the Source : 1894-97 : 2 =

1894 poem by Christopher Brennan

- by Christopher Brennan
- Written: 1894
- First published in: XXI Poems 1893-1897 : Towards the Source
- Country: Australia
- Language: English
- Publisher: Angus and Robertson
- Publication date: 1897

Full text
- Towards the Source : 1894-97 : 2 at Wikisource

"Towards the Source : 1894-97 : 2" is an 1894 poem by Australian author Christopher Brennan.

It was first published in 1897 in the author's collection XXI Poems 1893-1897 : Towards the Source, a limited edition of 200 copies, and subsequently republished in some of the author's other poetry collections, as well as in various poetry anthologies.

== Synopsis ==
"It is generally assumed by scholars that the lovers in the poem are Brennan himself and Anna Werth, whom he met while studying in Berlin in 1892 and married in Sydney in 1897."

== Critical reception ==
In his commentary on the poem in 60 Classic Australian Poems Geoff Page noted that it "remains a compelling poem more than a century after it was completed in 1894. It lyrically evokes a timeless moment – and is itself somehow timeless, perhaps as a result of this accomplishment. It looks back 300 years to love poems as early as John Donne's "The Extasie" but is not diminished or dated by such comparison."

== Publication history ==
After the poem's initial publication in XXI Poems 1893-1897 : Towards the Source in 1897 it was reprinted as follows:

- Poems (1913) by Christopher Brennan, G. B. Philip, 1913
- The Bulletin, 21 January 1915
- The Verse of Christopher Brennan edited by A. R. Chisholm and John Joseph Quinn, Angus and Robertson, 1960
- Bards in the Wilderness : Australian Colonial Poetry to 1920 edited by Adrian Mitchell and Brian Elliott, Nelson, 1970
- Selected Poems edited by G. A. Wilkes, Angus and Robertson, 1973
- Christopher Brennan edited by Terry Sturm, University of Queensland Press, 1984
- The Oxford Book of Australian Love Poems edited by Jennifer Strauss, Oxford University Press, 1993
- Australian Verse : An Oxford Anthology edited by John Leonard, Oxford University Press, 1998
- 60 Classic Australian Poems edited by Geoff Page, University of NSW Press, 2009
