= Sunholy =

Studio album by Shade Empire
- Released: 15 September 2023
- Genres: Symphonic metal; melodic death metal; black metal
- Length: 53:43
- Label: Candlelight

Shade Empire chronology
Poetry of the Ill-Minded (2017)	Sunholy (2023)

Singles from Sunholy
- 1. "Sunholy" Released: 9 June 2023; 2. "Maroon" Released: 11 August 2023; 3. "Torn Asunder" Released: 15 September 2023

Professional ratings
Review scores
Source	Rating
Distorted Sound	8/10
Ghost Cult Magazine	8/10
Metal Temple	9/10

Sunholy is the sixth studio album by the Finnish metal band Shade Empire. It was released on 15 September 2023 by Candlelight Records, their first album in six years since Poetry of the Ill-Minded. It was mixed by Chris Edrich (Devin Townsend, Leprous, Alcest), mastered by Pierrick Noël, and contains artwork by Andy Reich.

Several singles were released in advance of the album, including "Maroon", which the band considered "one of the finest compositions of our career so far. This is not just a song but a journey that requires you to hopefully stop by and listen. Maroon proves also that [new vocalist Henry Hämäläinen] is one of the most versatile vocalists in Finland as this track showcases his wide scale."

== Track listing ==
1. "In Amongst the Woods" – 5:14
2. "The Apostle" – 5:33
3. "This Coffin an Island" – 5:23
4. "Sunholy" – 6:57
5. "Torn Asunder" – 5:38
6. "Maroon" – 7:54
7. "All-Consuming Flame" – 6:43
8. "Profane Radiance" – 6:34
9. "Rite of Passage" – 3:47

== Personnel ==
Band members

- Henry Hämäläinen – clean vocal, growls, screams
- Aapeli Kivimäki – guitars
- Juha Sirkkiä – guitars
- Eero Mantere – bass
- Erno Räsänen – drums
- Francesco Ferrini — orchestrations (guest member) (Fleshgod Apocalypse)

== Charts ==
Chart performance for Sunholy
Chart (2023)	Peak position
Finnish Albums (Suomen virallinen lista)	27
