= Poetry of the Ill-Minded =

Studio album by Shade Empire
- Released: 30 June 2017
- Recorded: 2016
- Genre: Melodic death metal; symphonic black metal; industrial death metal
- Length: 45:00
- Label: Candlelight

Shade Empire chronology
Omega Arcane (2013)	Poetry of the Ill-Minded (2017)	Sunholy (2023)

Professional ratings
Review scores
Source	Rating
Metal.de	6/10
Metal Hammer	7/10
Metal Purgatory Media	8.5/10
The Moshville Times	10/10

Poetry of the Ill-Minded is the fifth studio album by the Finnish metal band Shade Empire. It was released on 30 June 2017 by Candlelight Records.

== Track listing ==
1. "Lecter (Welcome)" – 7:23
2. "Wanderer" – 4:31
3. "Drawn to Water - The Path" – 4:38
4. "Thy Scent" – 5:20
5. "Anti-Life Saviour" – 10:00
6. "Map of Scars" – 6:55
7. "Treasure (In Liquid Dreams of Mirror Universe)" – 6:13

== Personnel ==
Shade Empire

- Juha Harju – vocals
- Aapeli Kivimäki – guitars
- Juha Sirkkiä – guitars
- Olli Savolainen – synths
- Eero Mantere – bass
- Erno Räsänen – drums
