= Ajattara =

Finnish black metal band

- Origin: Helsinki, Finland
- Genres: Black metal, epic black metal, Grindcore, Doom metal
- Years active: 1996–2012, 2016-present
- Labels: Spinefarm, Osasto-A
- Members: See below
- Website: Official website

Ajattara is a sextet black metal band from Helsinki, Finland, led by Pasi Koskinen (ex Amorphis). They formed in 1996, split up in 2012, and reformed in 2016. They were signed to Spinefarm Records and have released eight albums. Their most recent, Lupaus, was released in May 2017.

== History ==
Ajattara formed in 1996 as a side project of Amorphis singer Pasi Koskinen. They released the demo tape Helvetissä on syntisen taivas in 1998. The band signed to Spikefarm Records and released three albums - Itse in 2001, Kuolema in 2003 and Tyhjyys in 2004. These albums were well received. Ajattara released the Christmas singles "Ilon juhla" in November 2004 and "Joulu" in November 2005. The band released another album in 2006, Äpäre, which met similar reviews as their last three. The band continued with the Christmas single tradition of 2004 and 2005 by releasing a single entitled Sika in 2006.

The band entered the studio on 1 June 2007 to begin recording the album Kalmanto, released on 5 September 2007. This album did not received good reviews. Some critics said the album sounded chaotic and forced. In April 2009, Ajattara released their sixth album, Noitumaa, an acoustic album that received better reviews than the previous release. In 2011, the band released their seventh studio album, Murhat.

The band announced on its Facebook page on 15 April 2012 that it had split up for reasons unknown.

On 23 March 2016, the band announced on their Facebook page that they would play at the Norwegian Blastfest in February 2017. Shortly after, on 9 May 2016, Pasi Koskinen announced the reunion of the band, announcing further live dates including Nummirock 2016 in Finland and Satan's Convention 2017 in Germany. In May 2017, the band released Lupaus, their eighth studio album and first since reforming.

== Musical style ==
Ajattara combine elements of black metal to produce a style of black metal not dissimilar to Celtic Frost, and to a lesser extent Samael. The combined use of synthesisers and heavy guitar sounds give Ajattara a distinct sound. The lyrical themes of Ajattara usually deal with death, evil and paganism.

== Line-up ==
=== Current members ===
- Ruoja ― lead vocals (1996-2012, 2016-present) rhythm guitar (1996—2009); studio keyboards (1996—2004)
- Kalmos (Vesa Wahlroos) ― lead guitar, backing vocals (2006—2012, 2016—present)
- Tohtori Kuolio ― bass guitar, backing vocals (2007—2012, 2016—present)
- Raajat (Janne Immonen) ― keyboards, backing vocals (2007—2012, 2016—present)
- Tartunta (Mynni Luukkainen) ― rhythm guitar (2009—2012, 2016—present)
- Malakias 6,8 (Rainer Tuomikanto) ― drums (2011—2012, 2016—present)

=== Session member ===
- Lempo (Iiro Illman) ― guitar (2018-)

=== Former members ===
==== Guitar ====
- Ismonster (Ismo Liljelund) - ?
- Samuel Lempo (Tomi Koivusaari) - (2005-2006)

==== Bass ====
- Atoni (Toni Laroma) - (1996-2007)

==== Keyboards ====
- Ikkala (Jarmo Ikala) - ?
- Akir Kalmo (Aki Räty) - ?
- Irstas (Kalle Sundström) - (2004-2007)

==== Drums ====
- Orpo (Pekka Kasari) - ?
- Malakias I (Pekka Sauvolainen) - (1996-2003)
- Malakias II (Jan Rechberger) - (2003-2004)
- Malakias III (Atte Sarkima) - (2004-2007)
- Malakias IV (Tonmi Lillman) - (2007–2011) † (died in 2012)

== Discography ==
Studio albums

- Itse (2001)
- Kuolema (2003)
- Tyhjyys (2004)
- Äpäre (2006)
- Kalmanto (2007)
- Noitumaa (2009)
- Murhat (2011)
- Lupaus (2017)

Compilation albums

- Joululevy (2009)

Demo albums

- Helvetissä on syntisen taivas (1998)

Singles

- "Ilon juhla" (2004)
- "Joulu" (2005)
- "Sika" (2006)
- "Tulppaani" (2007)
