= Jack's Last Muster =

Poem by Barcroft Boake

- by Barcroft Boake
- Written: 1890
- First published in: The Sydney Mail
- Country: Australia
- Language: English
- Publication date: 13 December 1890

Full text
- Jack's Last Muster at Wikisource

Jack's Last Muster is a poem by Australian poet Barcroft Boake. It was first published in The Sydney Mail on 13 December 1890 subtitled "Diamantina River. Western Queensland", and later in the poet's poetry collection Where the Dead Men Lie, and Other Poems (1897).

== Analysis ==
N. E. Gladhill in The West Australian included this poem in an essay examining the extent of the horse's inspiration on Australian poets. ""Jack's Last Muster" is one of the few instances of [Boake's] work, where we experience the rhythm of joy and the feeling of carefreeness. Could Boake have dragged himself from the melancholia and hopeless outlook on life that obsessed him he might have given us an epic of bush life. He conceived the idea of one when it was too late; when life had destroyed his hope, and he had invited death to put an end to his hopelessness. "Jack's Last Muster" is reminiscent of Gordon in his raciest style. It is written in the metre of "How we beat the Favourite;" but beyond portraying Boake's love of the horse, it is scarcely illustrative of the brooding, melancholy bushman as we know him."

In a survey of the poet's work, an essayist in The Observer (Adelaide) states "Kendall wrote of 'sweet running waters, and soft unfooted dells,' but Boake drew vivid word-pictures of the inland country in its most savage and most pitiless aspects. In dealing with such scenes lie submerged the idealistic in his temperament, and described the life as he found it — took bright patches from Nature and transferred them to paper. In "Jack's Last Muster" the swing of the lines is not more pronounced than their graphic beauty."

== Further publications ==
- Old Ballads from the Bush edited by Bill Scott (1987)
- Two Centuries of Australian Poetry edited by Kathrine Bell (2007)

== See also ==
- 1890 in poetry
- 1890 in literature
- 1890 in Australian literature
- Australian literature
