= Barcroft Capel Boake =

Australian photographer (1838–1921)

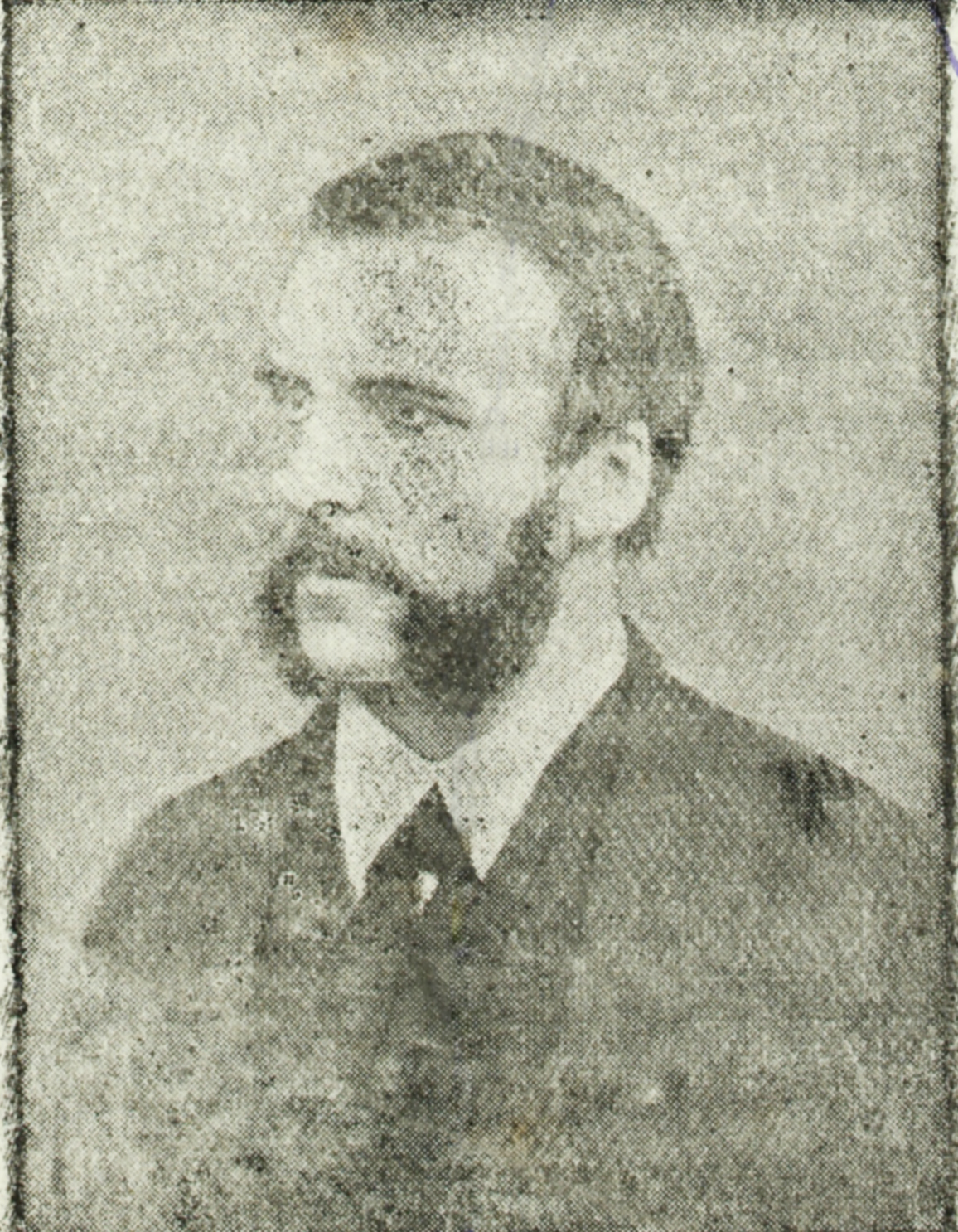
- Born: 12 November 1838; Dublin, Ireland
- Died: 1921 (aged 82–83); Victoria, Australia
- Occupation: Photographer
- Spouse: Florence Eva Clark

Barcroft Capel Boake (12 November 1838 – 1921) was an Australian photographer. He is most famous for his mosaic of the New South Wales Contingent produced in 1885 which represents the soldiers returned from the war in Sudan.

== Personal life ==
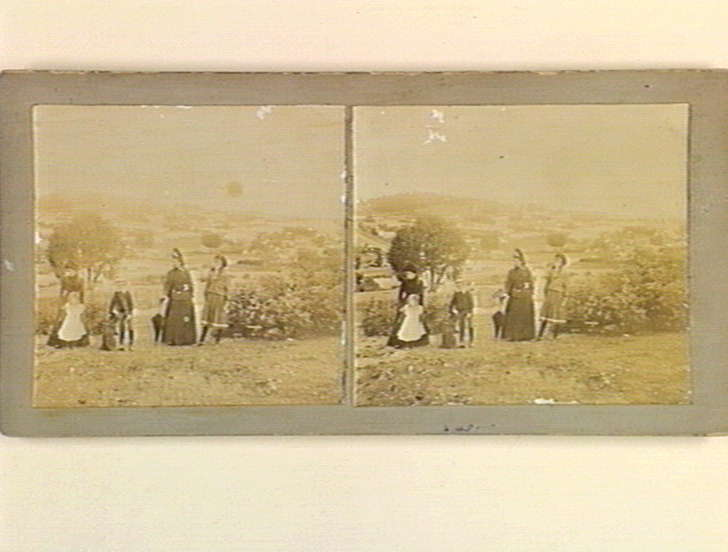
Wombat Hill, Daylesford, 1855, by B.C.Boake, albumen silver stereograph

Barcroft was born in Dublin, Ireland on 12 November 1838, the son of Barcroft Boake, DD. Boake migrated after seeking advice from his cousin who was rector of Holy Trinity Church, Balaclava, Victoria. He moved to Melbourne, Victoria in the 1850s, and then moved on to live in Sydney in 1858. He arrived with some experience and knowledge of photography and worked at Freeman's studio in Sydney for many years. In 1865 he married Florence Eva Clark at St John's Church Darlinghurst, Sydney and they both moved to Vergemont cottage in Waterview Bay, Balmain. After a time working for Freeman Brothers he set up a photographic studio at 330 George St, Sydney which he ran until he was declared bankrupt.

"Barcroft Boake Junior inherited from his father a poetical brain...which refined is conception to a pitch of genius...Had he lived...had fortune favored, Boake might easily have won recognition as the foremost poet of Australia."

— A.G.Stephens

Although struggling with personal life tragedies and economic worries he was one of the most successful and popular professional photographers of the latter half of the 19th century. He did however spend the last 30 years of his life in obscurity.

B.C. Boake's son Barcroft Henry Thomas Boake was born in Vergemont cottage, Balmain, on 26 March 1866. This was the year B.C. Boake left Freeman's studio to set up his own business. His son was a talented poet who left home at the age of 17, and after struggling with bouts of depression was found dead in 1892, after returning to his father's home. By this time B.C. Boake was bankrupt and he was a widower.

"Barcroft Capel Boake was one of our best photographers. He was a fine man. He did not deserve what life did to him."

— A.G.Stephens

His daughters were married and living away from his home which was eventually sold and his studio and all other possessions were lost to creditors. It was around this time he decided to move to the small town of Daylesford, Victoria where he opened a small studio. B.C. Boake ran the studio for many years before he was burnt to death in February 1921, allegedly after falling asleep while smoking a pipe. He was 83.

== Photography career ==
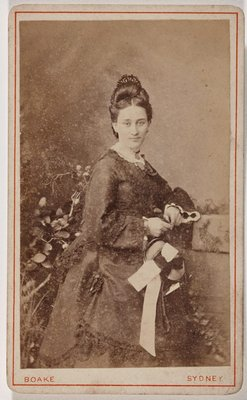
Untitled, 1867-1877, by B.C.Boake, carte de visite

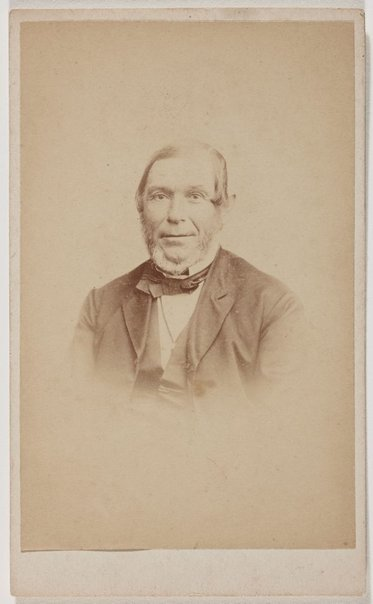
Untitled, 1867-1877, by B.C.Boake, carte de visite

After migrating to Australia, Barcroft Capel Boake spent the majority of his working life in Sydney. He had a hugely successful business. Owning and running his own studio on George St, where he explored the streets and buildings of Sydney through his wet plate work. These outdoor prints would be sold as whole albums. His most successful works are of his male subjects. However his images of women and children were collected in albums, as the small delicately coloured prints are considered the best of that period and time of portrait photography. The highly persevered state of his prints suggest that people of the time went to Boake for charming miniatures. He volunteered as a captain in the 7th Battery of New South Wales Voluntary Artillery. Here Boake made his most famous work, the mosaic of the returning New South Wales contingent that fought in the Sudan campaign of 1885. Capel practised in many different photographic printing and developing techniques. The heliograph and the instantaneous process were ways Boake was able to maintain the fine art quality of his execution. The competitors from other local studios moved to larger prints, while Boake maintained his artistic reputation, working on finer photographs. Barcroft often printed his images as cartes de visite popularised by André-Adolphe-Eugène Disdéri in 1854.

== New South Wales Contingent mosaic ==
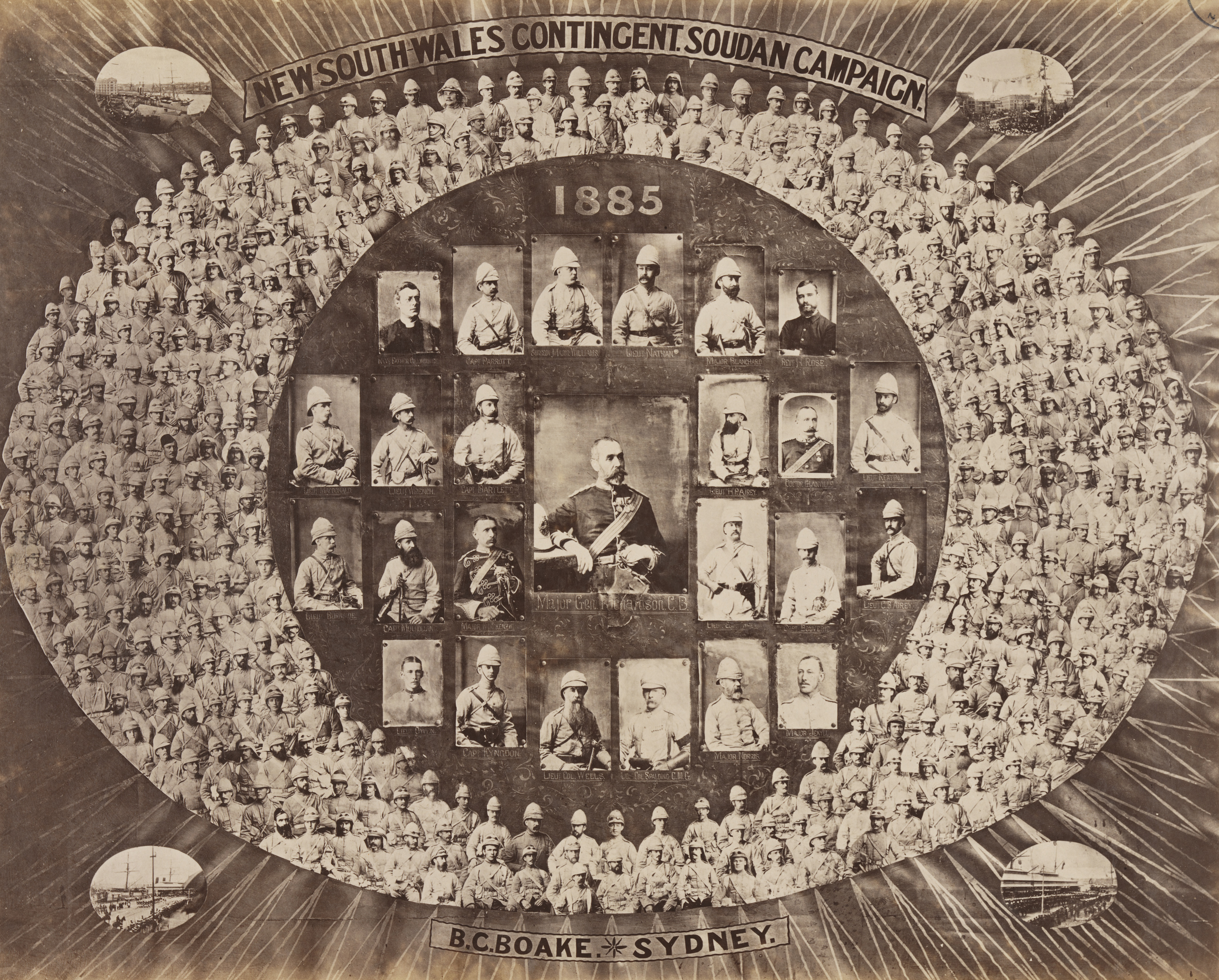
Composite photographic portrait of the New South Wales Contingent, Sudan Campaign, 1885,

In 1885, the greatest mosaic of the nineteenth century was made by Barcroft Capel Boake. The mosaic was after the return from war in Sudan, of the New South Wales Contingent. Portraits of the men of war were placed and stuck onto a black and gilt banner. The photographs of the men were arranged in a swirl around the main expedition leaders. Some say they resemble the rings of Saturn. The mosaic measured 175 centimetres tall by 200 centimetres wide. This was the finest hour in Boake's career as a photographer.

The portraits and group portraits were created at the return of the New South Wales, Australian Contingent. Soon after they arrived home Boake began his work with the soldiers, the Colonial and Indian Exhibition featured the photographic portraits and work. Many hundreds of copies were sold as keepsakes and art. Recently a canvas banner was rediscovered with a giant version of the print on it. It was rediscovered at the Australian War Memorial. The existence of this copy and slightly different versions of the photographic mosaic, suggest another banner might be in existence somewhere waiting to be discovered.

"I am commanded by the Queen to thank Mr. B. C. Boake, through you, for the photograph of the New South Wales Contingent, which her Majesty was much pleased to accept."

— Sir H. Ponsonby

An article was published in the Sydney Morning Herald, in the "News of the Day" header. The mosaic was planned to be used to preserve the memory of the members of the New South Wales Contingent. The Banner was presented to her Majesty Queen Victoria and subsequently Boake received a letter thanking him for his mosaic from Sir H Ponsonby, through the Agent-General. Boake informed the paper that he had begun making copies. The first duplicate of the mosaic was on view at his George street studio.
