= Shade Empire =

Finnish symphonic black metal band

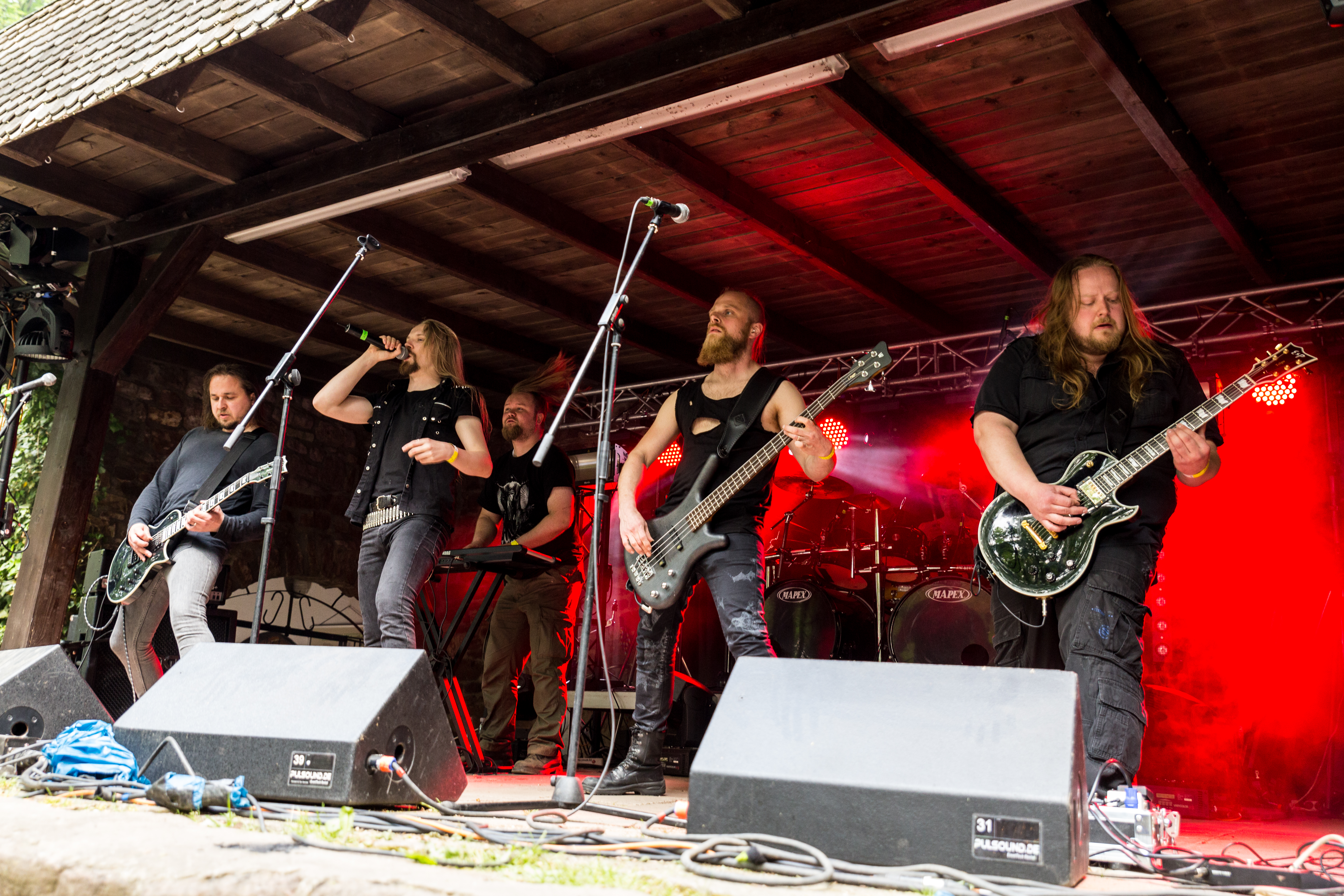

Background information
- Origin: Kuopio, Finland
- Genres: Symphonic black metal; melodic death metal; industrial death metal
- Years active: 1999–present
- Labels: Avantgarde Music, Dynamic Arts Records, Candlelight
- Members: Eero Mantere; Juha Sirkkiä; Erno Räsänen; Aapeli Kivimäki; Henry Hämäläinen
- Past members: Tero Liimatainen; Antti Makkonen; Janne Niiranen; Juha Harju; Olli Savolainen
- Website: shadeempire.com

Shade Empire is a Finnish extreme metal band, formed in 1999 in the city of Kuopio.

Shade Empire's prevalent lyrical subjects are death, destruction, hatred, anti-religion and pain. The music on their first three official full-length releases, Sinthetic, Intoxicate O.S. and Zero Nexus, bears a melodic sort of black metal, featuring the usage of both electronic and symphonic elements. Since then, they have been noted "to use symphonic black with industrial and death metal compositions" and have been compared to Septicflesh, Fleshgod Apocalypse, Dimmu Borgir and Graveworm.

Their second album, Intoxicate O.S., had moderate success, reaching number 25 in weekly Finnish album sales.

== Gallery ==
Band members at the Dark Troll Festival 2018

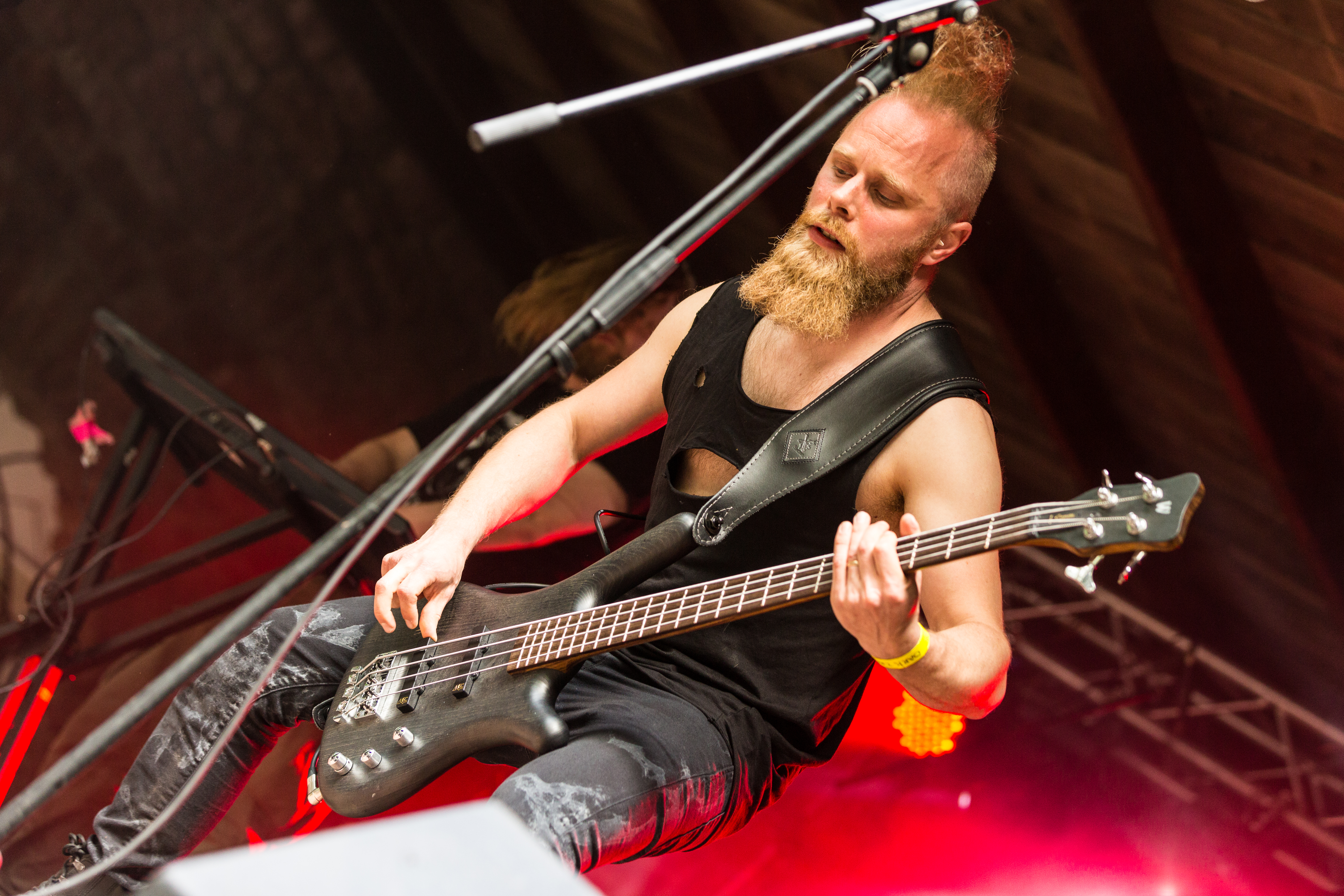
Bassist Eero Mantere

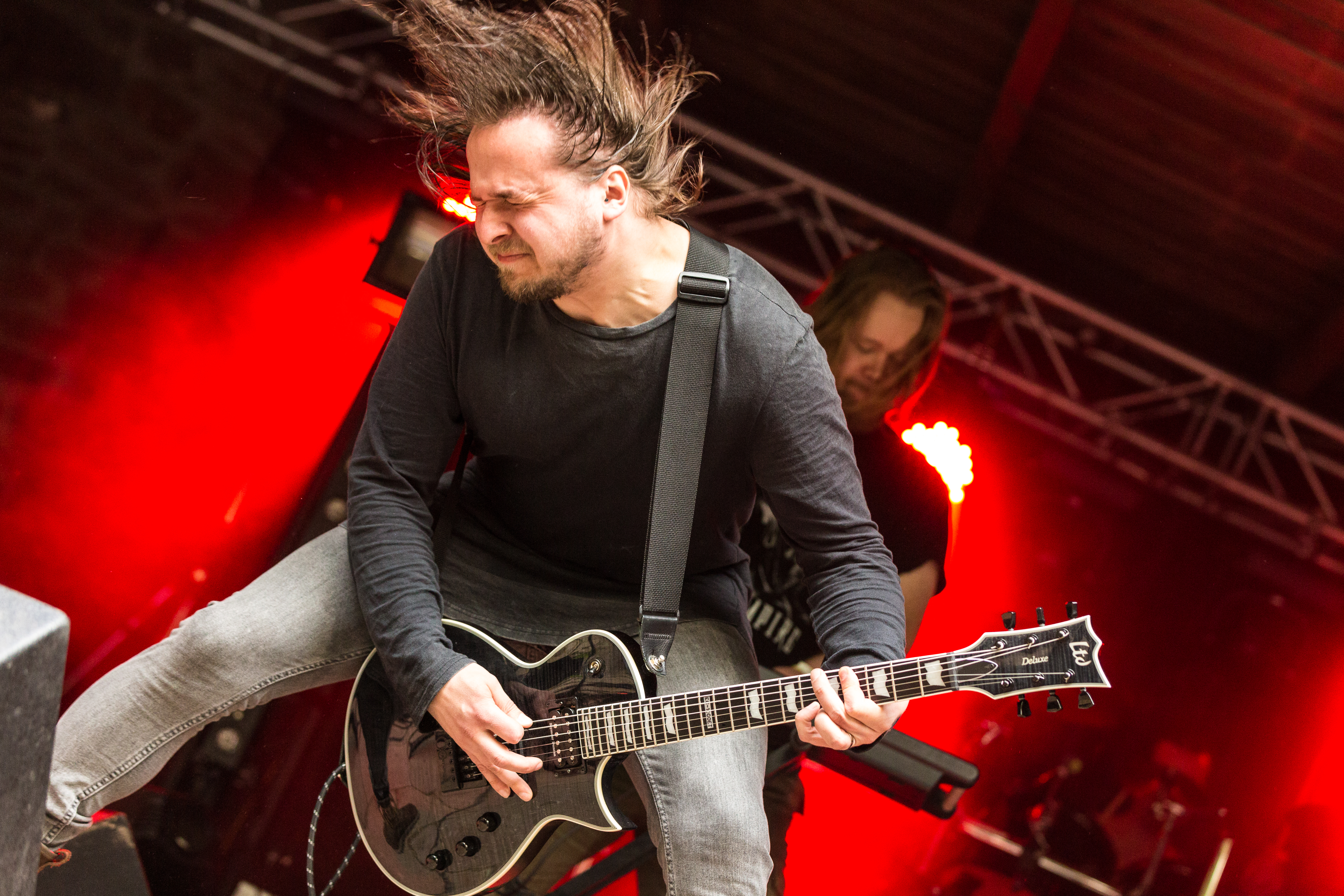
Guitarist Juha Sirkkiä

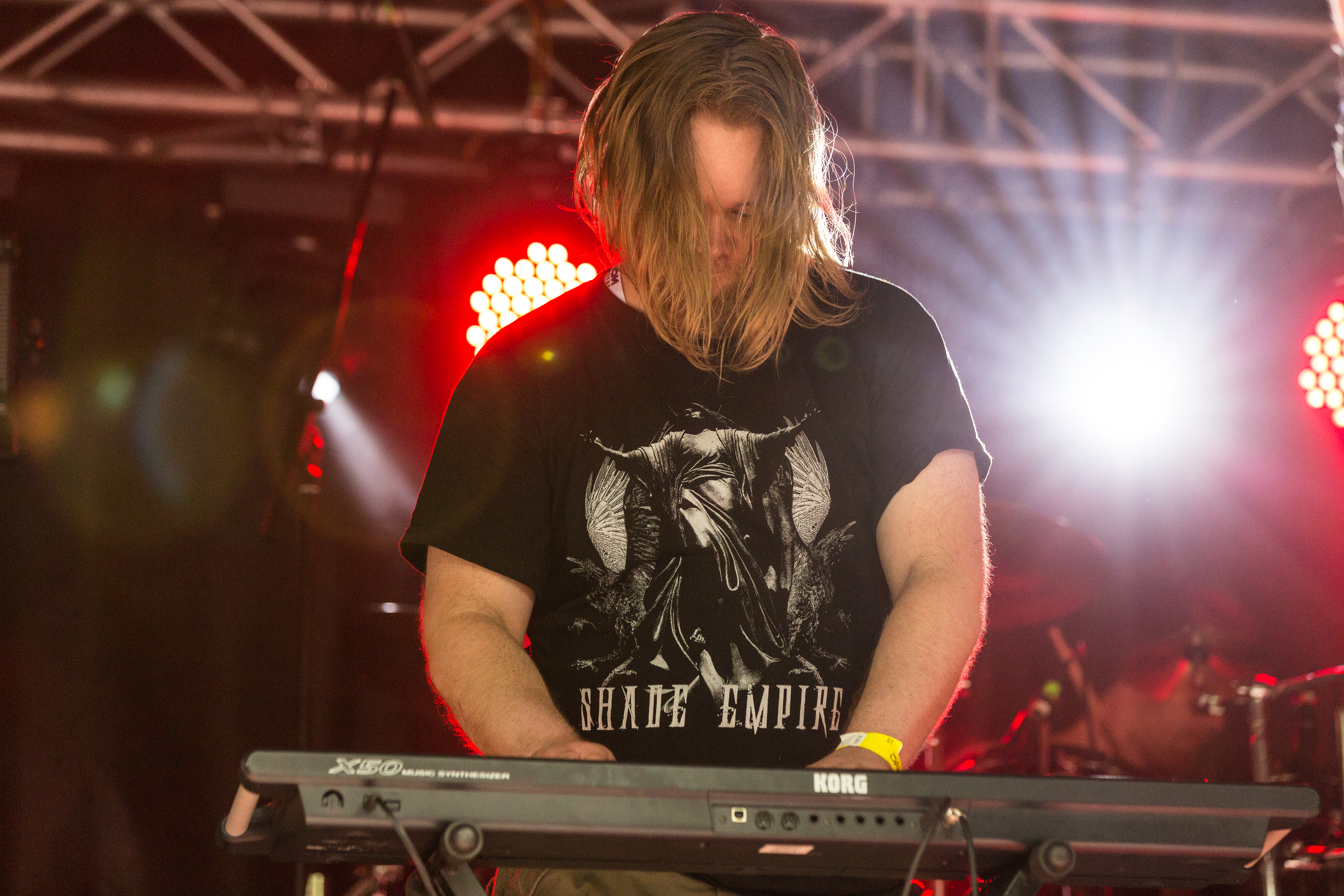
Keyboardist Olli Savolainen

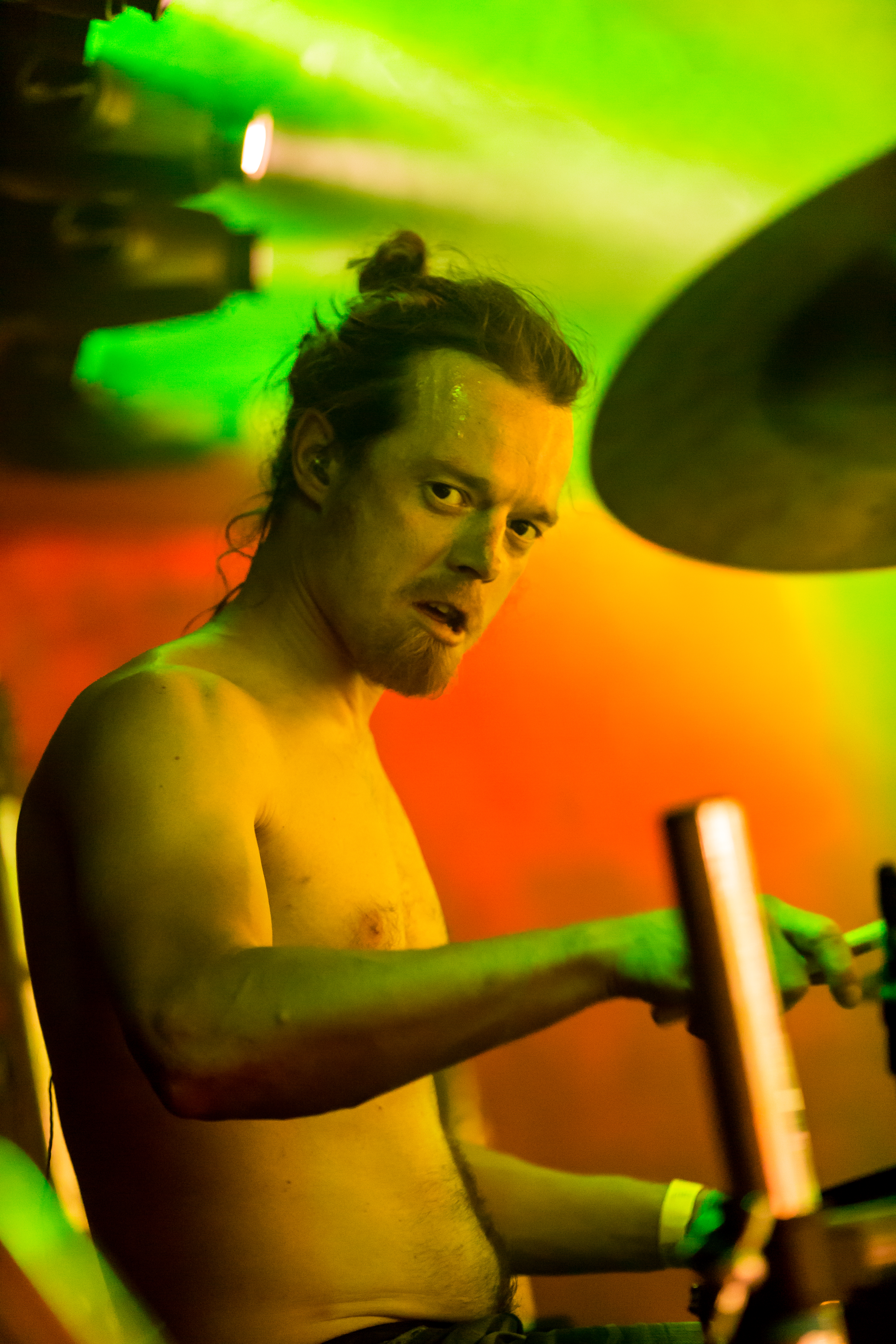
Drummer Erno Räsänen

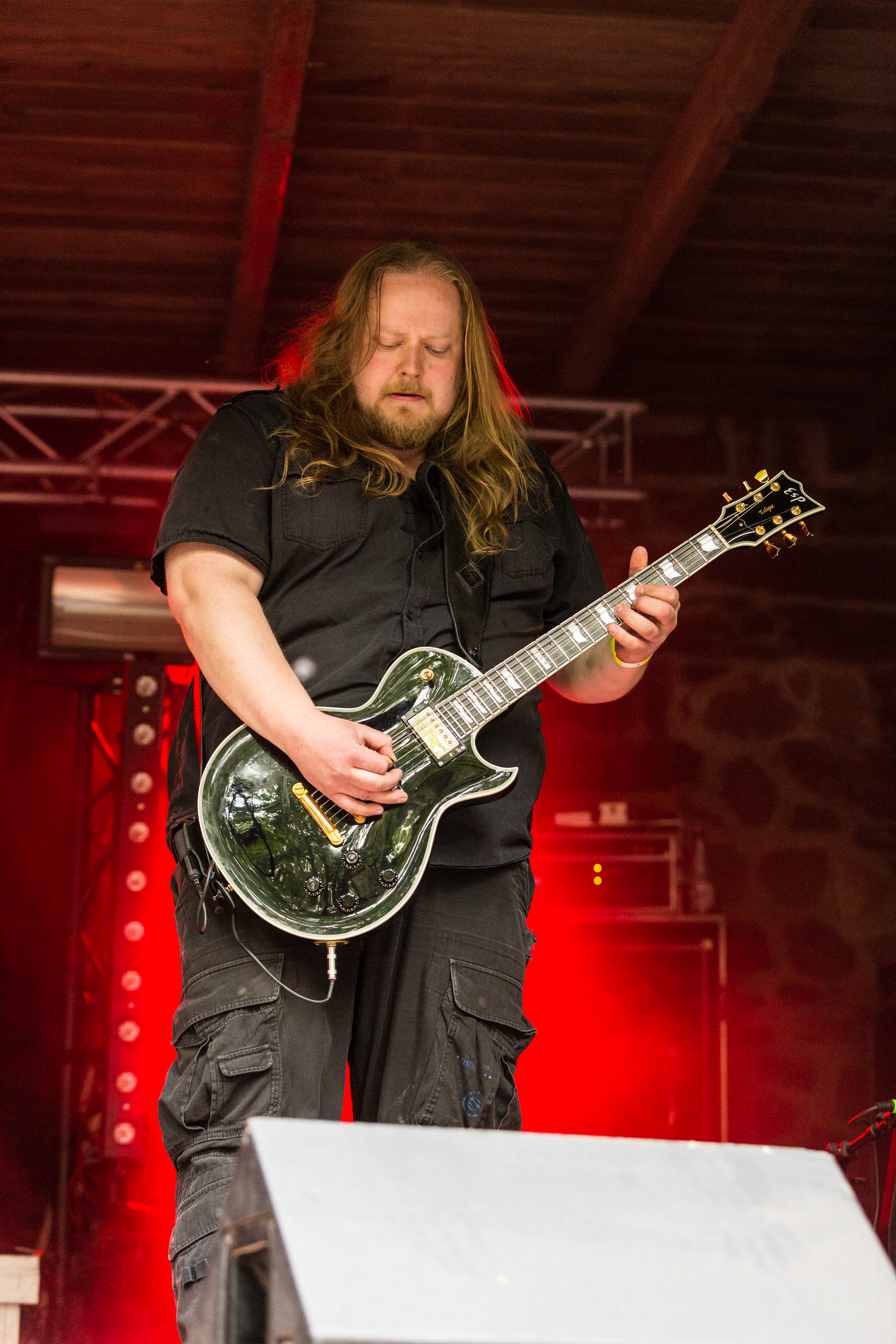
Guitarist Aapeli Kivimäki

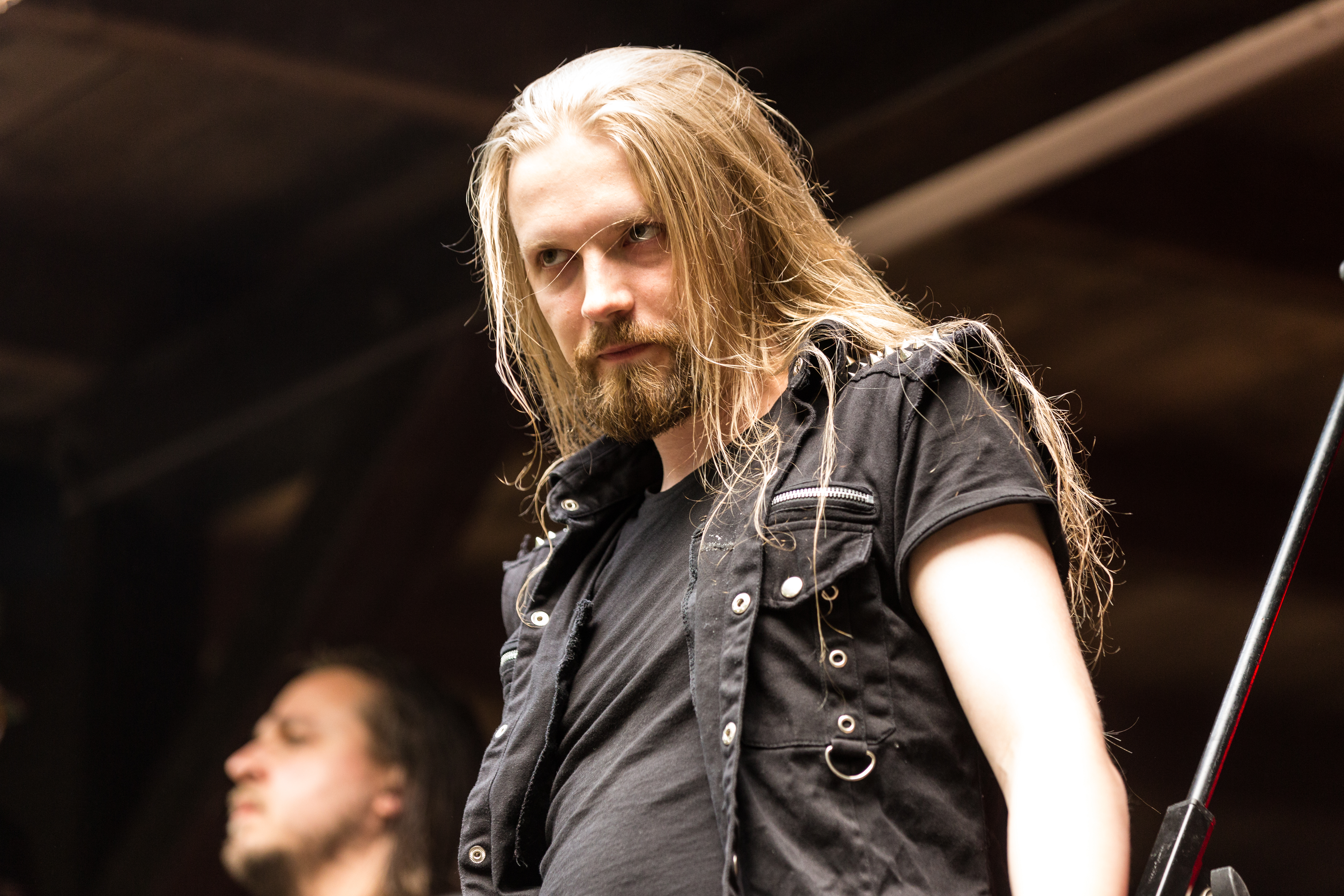
Singer Henry Hämäläinen

== Members ==
=== Present ===
- Eero Mantere – bass (1999–present)
- Juha Sirkkiä – guitars (1999–present)
- Erno Räsänen – drums (2006–present)
- Aapeli Kivimäki - guitars (2013–present)
- Henry Hämäläinen – vocals (2017–present)

=== Previous members ===
- Tero Liimatainen – guitars (1999-2000)
- Antti Makkonen – drums (1999–2006)
- Janne Niiranen – guitars (2000-2013)
- Juha Harju – vocals (2000-2017)
- Olli Savolainen – keyboards (2000–2021)

== Discography ==
=== Studio albums ===
- Sinthetic (2004)
- Intoxicate O.S. (2006)
- Zero Nexus (2008)
- Omega Arcane (2013)
- Poetry of the Ill-Minded (2017)
- Sunholy (2023)

=== Singles and EPs ===
- Slitwrist Ecstasy (2006)
- Anti-Life Saviour (2017)

=== Live and other albums ===
- Throne of Eternal Night (2000, demo)
- Daemon (2001, demo)
- Essence of Pain (2002, demo)
