= Where the Dead Men Lie, and Other Poems =

Poetry collection by Barcroft Boake

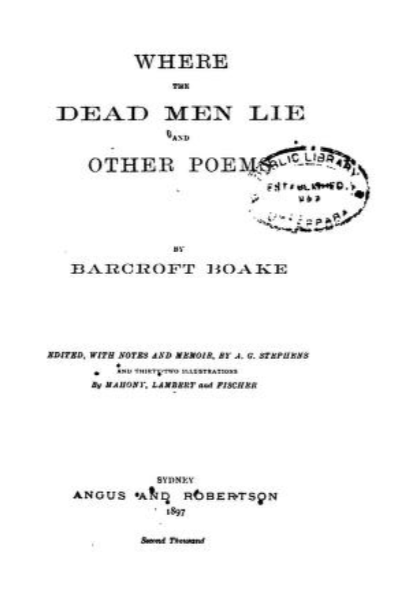
- Title page for Where the Dead Men Lie, and Other Poems (1897)
- Author: Barcroft Boake
- Language: English
- Genre: Bush poetry
- Publisher: Angus and Robertson
- Publication date: 1897
- Publication place: Australia
- Media type: Print (hardback & paperback)
- Pages: 208

Where the Dead Men Lie, and Other Poems (1897) is the first and only collection of poems by Australian poet Barcroft Boake. Edited by A. G. Stephens, it was released in hardback by Angus and Robertson in 1897, five years after the poet's death. It contains an introduction by the editor, an introductory poem by Will H. Ogilvie, and features the poet's major works "Jack's Last Muster", "Jim's Whip" and "Where the Dead Men Lie".

The original collection includes 33 poems by the author that are reprinted from various sources, though they mainly originally appeared in The Bulletin.

In his introduction to the volume, editor Stephens posed the question: "Should Boake be treated from a literary standpoint or from a personal standpoint — as poet or as man and poet?" Stephens chose the personal, later noting "...Boake's least remarkable compositions, with two or three exceptions, are as characteristic of Australia and of himself as are the most remarkable. So, instead of trying to exalt the Poet by his work, I have tried rather to show the Man in his poetry."

Stephens concluded the volume by including his memoir of the poet.

== Contents ==
- "From the Far West"
- "Jack's Last Muster"
- "A Memory"
- "Josephus Riley"
- "A Vision Out West"
- "Jim's Whip"
- "The Demon Snow Shoes"
- "A Valentine"
- "The Box Tree's Love"
- "A Wayside Queen"
- "Fogarty's Gin"
- "A Song from a Sandhill"
- "The Babes in the Bush"
- "The Digger's Song"
- "How Polly Paid for her Keep"
- "An Allegory"
- "Kitty McCrae"
- "'Twixt the Wings of the Yard"
- "A Song"
- "Skeeta"
- "On the Boundary"
- "Babs Malone"
- "At the 'J.C.'"
- "Jack Corrigan"
- "Down the River"
- "Kelly's Conversion"
- "On the Range"
- "At Devlin's Siding"
- "Fetherstonhaugh"
- "Desiree"
- "Where the Dead Men Lie"

== Critical reception ==
On its original publication in Australia a reviewer in The Queenslander concluded that the volume "should find an honoured place on the colonial bookshelf beside such authors as Adam Lindsay Gordon, Brunton Stephens, Paterson, and Lawson; and we venture the opinion that its author is not the least of these."

The Town and Country Journal opined that Boake had the makings of a major Australian poet: "The memoir appended to the collected poems by their editor, A. G. Stephens, shows as plainly as do the verses themselves how their author possessed the qualifications necessary to an Australian poet. His faculty of versification, though wholly untrained, sufficed for the production of lines whose rugged character — even to the substitution of assonance for rhyme — is appropriate enough to a bushman's lays of the bush, and will offend those only of his readers who value nicety of literary, workmanship. His experiences as surveyor, as boundary-rider, and in travelling with stock, gave him practical and varied knowledge of the life and scenes of inland Australia; while the natural and, perhaps, hereditary disposition of his mind enabled him to discern their picturesque and romantic aspects."

Banjo Patterson authored a review of the work in The Review of Reviews, 1897, including an overview of Boake's life and demise, and then a critique of his prose. Patterson suggested that Boake's work was of variable quality: "It is necessary to say "with the poetic inspiration", because without it Boake sank to a very medium level. In fact, his work is so uneven that on reading over the various pieces, it would be difficult to believe that they are all one man's work, if one did not fully realise that in his best pieces the spirit of the bush took hold of him, and he spoke as one possessed. In his uninspired work he was rather a poor literary craftsman, writing without any of the vigour and dash that might have atoned for other shortcomings." and also "The book abounds in narrative verse dealing with bush incidents; but as a rule this work is flat, dull, and unprofitable. The two examples given above are, perhaps, of the worst; but in very few of the narrative pieces do any thrilling or dashing lines occur." He appraises "'Twixt the Wings of the Yard" as the exception, stating that when writing poems such as these, "to very few is it given to express their feelings in such words as came with the poetic inspiration to Barcroft Henry Boake". He includes several examples of the strongest and weakest parts of the work. He concludes with "What Boake might have done, had he lived, is a matter for conjecture. The fact remains that in the short space of eighteen months, he produced this poem and at least three others of more than average merit, while turning out a lot of hack work. The death of such a man is a loss to our scanty roll of writers."

== See also ==
- 1897 in Australian literature
- 1897 in poetry
