= Where the Dead Men Lie =

Poem by Barcroft Boake

- by Barcroft Boake
- Written: 1891
- First published in: The Bulletin
- Country: Australia
- Language: English
- Publication date: 19 December 1891

Full text
- Where the Dead Men Lie (poem) at Wikisource

"Where the Dead Men Lie" is a poem by Australian poet Barcroft Boake. It was first published in The Bulletin magazine on 19 December 1891, and later in the poet's poetry collection Where the Dead Men Lie, and Other Poems (1897).

== Analysis ==
J. Larcombe in The Worker considered the poem "Boake's masterpiece...In it the young poet expressed his detestation of the cruel, selfish squatters, their inhuman conduct, and the tragedy for which they were responsible."

The Oxford Companion to Australian Literature states "In the poem Boake uses the contemptuous name 'Moneygrub' to denote the typical wealthy absentee landlord who lives in city luxury provided for him by the ordinary men and women of the outback..."

The Cambridge History of Australian Literature described the poem "as by far the bleakest poetic vision" of the Australian landscape as it evokes "a haunted frontier."

Cecil Mann, an associate editor of The Bulletin in the 1960s, theorised that the two "political stanzas" which conclude the poem were not written by Boake but were added by a leftist sub-editor of The Bulletin. However, Boake's biographer Clement Semmler later published correspondence by Boake expressing similar sentiments.

== Further publications ==
- The Golden Treasury of Australian Verse edited by Bertram Stevens, Angus and Robertson (1909)
- The Oxford Book of Australasian Verse edited by Walter Murdoch (1918)
- An Anthology of Australian Verse edited by George Mackaness, Angus & Robertson (1952)
- Freedom on the Wallaby : Poems of the Australian People edited by Marjorie Pizer, Pinchgut Press (1953)
- A Book of Australian Verse edited by Judith Wright, Oxford University Press (1956)
- Favourite Australian Poems edited by Ian Mudie (1963)
- From the Ballads to Brennan edited by T. Inglis Moore (1964)
- The Penguin Book of Australian Verse edited by Harry Payne Heseltine (1972)
- Australian Verse from 1805 : A Continuum edited by Geoffrey Dutton (1976)
- The Collins Book of Australian Poetry edited by Rodney Hall (1981)
- The Illustrated Treasury of Australian Verse edited by Beatrice Davis (1984)
- Cross-Country : A Book of Australian Verse edited by John Barnes and Brian McFarlane (1984)
- My Country : Australian Poetry and Short Stories, Two Hundred Years edited by Leonie Kramer (1985)
- A Treasury of Bush Verse edited by G. A. Wilkes, Angus and Robertson, 1991
- The Penguin Book of Australian Ballads edited by Elizabeth Webby and Philip Butterss, Penguin, 1993
- Australian Verse : An Oxford Anthology edited by John Leonard, Oxford University Press, 1998
- Classic Australian Verse edited by Maggie Pinkney, Five Mile Press, 2001
- Two Centuries of Australian Poetry edited by Kathrine Bell, Gary Allen, 2007
- An Anthology of Australian Poetry to 1920 edited by John Kinsella, University of Western Australia Library, 2007
- 100 Australian Poems You Need to Know edited by Jamie Grant, Hardie Grant, 2008
- The Puncher & Wattmann Anthology of Australian Poetry edited by John Leonard, Puncher & Wattmann, 2009
- Macquarie PEN Anthology of Australian Literature edited by Nicholas Jose, Kerryn Goldsworthy, Anita Heiss, David McCooey, Peter Minter, Nicole Moore and Elizabeth Webby, Allen & Unwin, 2009
- Australian Poetry Since 1788 edited by Geoffrey Lehmann and Robert Gray, University of NSW Press, 2011

== See also ==
- 1891 in poetry
- 1891 in literature
- 1891 in Australian literature
- Australian literature
