= USS Wanderer (SP-132) =

Patrol vessel of the United States Navy

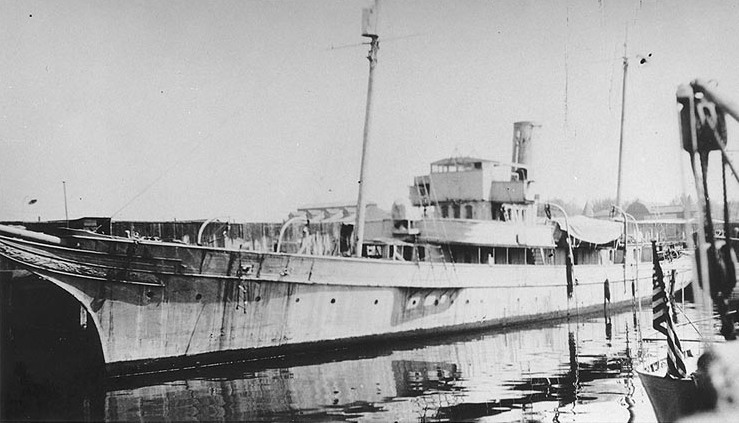
- USS Wanderer sometime between 1917 and 1919.

History

United States
- Name: USS Wanderer
- Namesake: Previous name retained
- Port of registry: Newport, Rhode Island
- Builder: Ramage & Ferguson, Leith
- Yard number: 152
- Launched: 29 May 1897
- Completed: 1897
- Acquired: 10 June 1917
- Commissioned: 14 July 1917
- Decommissioned: April 1919
- Stricken: 24 April 1919
- Fate: Sold 22 July 1920
- Notes: Operated as private yacht Kethailes 1897–1903, and Wanderer 1903–1917 and from 1920

General characteristics
- Type: armed yacht
- Tonnage: 362 GRT, 185 NRT
- Length: 197 ft 0 in (60.05 m) overall; 178.4 ft (54.4 m) registered
- Beam: 24.15 ft (7.36 m)
- Draft: 13 ft 0 in (3.96 m) aft
- Depth: 13.8 ft (4.2 m)
- Installed power: 66 NHP
- Propulsion: 1 × triple-expansion engine; 1 × screw
- Sail plan: schooner
- Speed: 12 knots (22 km/h)
- Complement: 56
- Armament: 2 × 3-inch (76 mm) guns; 2 × machine guns

The third USS Wanderer (SP-132), was an armed yacht that served in the United States Navy from 1917 to 1919.

Wanderer was built in 1897 as the "gentleman's private steam yacht" Kethailes at Leith, Scotland, by Ramage & Ferguson for William Johnston, a wealthy shipowner. Kethailes was sold to Mr. H. A. C. Taylor of New York City in 1903 and renamed Wanderer.

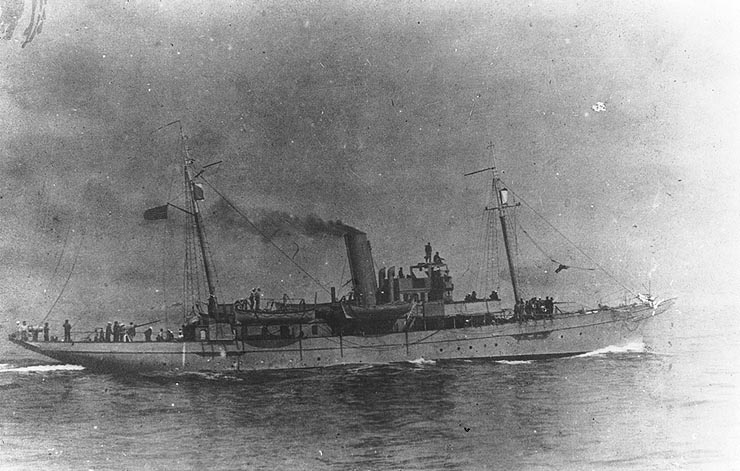
USS Wanderer (SP-132) underway in 1917, perhaps during US Navy acceptance trials.

The US Navy acquired Wanderer from Taylor on 10 June 1917 for service in World War I. Designated SP-132, she was commissioned as USS Wanderer New York on 14 July 1917.

On 28 July 1917, Wanderer departed New York for a brief shakedown before she joined the rest of her division at St. John's, Newfoundland, where she arrived on 9 August 1917. Wanderer and six other yachts cleared St. John's on 12 August 1917 bound for Ponta Delgada in the Azores, where they made a four-day stop between 19 August 1917 and 24 August 1917. Late in the evening of 29 August 1917, the yachts anchored off the breakwater at their destination, Brest, France. The next morning, she and her division mates entered the port itself and tied up to mooring buoys.

Wanderer was assigned to antisubmarine patrol and coastal convoy escort duties along the north Bay of Biscay coast. Her duty there was enlivened by the weather, which was known for its severity. Wanderer — designed as a pleasure craft, not as sturdy as a warship — had less to fear from German U-boats than from naval mines, weather, and the rocky, foggy shore. She operated initially on the Brest-to-Quiberon Bay leg of the coastal convoy route. To add to the danger, the Americans initially adopted the French-British system of running their coastal and channel convoys at night.

The darkness, however, did not hide Wanderer's convoy on the night of 28–29 November 1917, when a submarine successfully sank one of the ships in the convoy and made good her escape. The darkness that was supposed to conceal the convoy actually covered the U-boat's retirement and foiled attempts to hunt the submerged enemy.

Nevertheless, the French and British insisted on night rather than daylight convoys. It was not until the evening of 7 January 1918, when another Wanderer-escorted convoy lost four ships to a U-boat, that the French and British acquiesced to US demands for daylight convoys supported by patrolling aircraft.

The theory behind sending convoys through dangerous waters during daylight was that it as better to find and attack the enemy than try to conceal shipping from him. The very next week, Wanderer's first daylight convoy — also one of the first so conducted — helped to prove the validity of the concept of daylight convoys escorted by ships and aircraft, making the voyage unmolested. On 12 January 1918, while escorting that convoy from Brest to Quiberon Bay in daylight, Wanderer rescued 10 survivors from the French ship Chateau Faite, which had attempted a night transit. "Penmarch Pete", as the Allies nicknamed the U-boat usually stationed off Point Penmarc'h — had exacted his toll.

On 8 February 1918, Wanderer's portion of the coastal convoy route was extended. From then on, instead of simply making the single-day passage from Brest to Quiberon Bay, she laid over for the night at Quiberon Bay and continued south with the convoy to the mouth of the Gironde River and thence into Bordeaux. On the night of 22–23 April 1918, during the layover at Quiberon Bay on the return trip from Bordeaux to Brest, she witnessed the explosion of the ammunition-laden Florence H. . Though in reasonably close proximity to the ill-fated ship, Wanderer was prevented from approaching the floating conflagration by the large quantity of high explosives she carried to use against U-boats. Instead, she was forced to leave the rescue operations to the destroyers and smaller craft in the bay.

Wanderer continued her escort and patrol service on the French coast through the end of the war. It appears that she had no further noteworthy encounters with the enemy before the Armistice of 11 November 1918.

Wanderer left Brest on 5 December 1918, sailed via the Azores and Bermuda, and reached New London, Connecticut, on 30 December 1918. In April 1919, she moved to New York City and was decommissioned. Her name was struck from the Navy List on 24 April 1919, and she was sold on 22 July 1920 to Mr. J. S. Webster of Baltimore, Maryland.

Wanderer was one of two US Navy warships named USS Wanderer in service simultaneously during World War I, the other being USS Wanderer (SP-2440).
