= USS Wanderer (SP-2440) =

Patrol vessel of the United States Navy

History

United States
- Name: USS Wanderer
- Namesake: Previous name retained
- Builder: Craig Brothers, Norfolk, Virginia
- Completed: 1913
- Acquired: 13 April 1917
- Commissioned: 13 April 1917
- Fate: Returned to owner 30 December 1918
- Notes: Operated as private motorboat Wanderer 1913-1917 and from the end of 1918

General characteristics
- Type: Patrol vessel
- Displacement: 5 tons
- Length: 33 ft 6 in (10.21 m)
- Beam: 9 ft 0 in (2.74 m)
- Draft: 2 ft 6 in (0.76 m) mean
- Speed: 9.5 knots

The second USS Wanderer (SP-2440) was a patrol vessel that served in the United States Navy from 1917 to 1918.

Wanderer was a motorboat built in 1913 at Norfolk, Virginia, by Craig Brothers, and owned by R. F. Barret of Norfolk. She was acquired by the U.S. Navy for service as a section patrol boat during World War I. Inspected at the 5th Naval District on 13 April 1917 and designated SP-2440, she was placed in commission on the same day as USS Wanderer.

Wanderer operated on local and section patrol duties for the duration of World War I. She was returned to her owner on 30 December 1918.

Wanderer was one of two U.S. Navy ships named USS Wanderer in service simultaneously during World War I, the other being USS Wanderer (SP-132).
