= The Wanderer (Massachusetts newspaper) =

American newspaper founded in 1992

- Type: Weekly newspaper
- Owner: Wanderer Com Inc.
- Founded: 1992
- Headquarters: 55 County Road (Route 6) Mattapoisett, Massachusetts
- ISSN: 1559-1212
- Website: wanderer.com

The Wanderer is a weekly newspaper that serves the "Tri-town area" of Marion, Mattapoisett, and Rochester in southeastern Massachusetts. The Wanderer is published by Wanderer Com Inc., at 55 County Road in Mattapoisett.

== History ==
The Wanderer was first published in 1992 It was named after Wanderer (1879), the last whaling ship built in Mattapoisett.
