= Raymond P. Holden =

American poet and publisher

Raymond Peckham Holden (April 7, 1894, New York City – June 26, 1972, North Newport, NH) was a novelist, poet and publisher.

Holden worked for several prominent American magazines, including The New Yorker, Reader’s Digest, and Newsweek. He also authored his own books and contributed poetry to journals.

== Early life ==
Raymond Holden was the third child of Edwin Babcock Holden, a wealthy coal merchant, and Alice Cort. He attended the New York Collegiate School, and left Princeton University in 1915 without graduating. He served in the National Guard cavalry in Texas from 1916–1917.

In 1915 Holden first befriended Robert Frost, the poet, a neighbor in Franconia, New Hampshire. Holden moved to New Hampshire in 1919 and bought some land from Frost. He acquired what remained of Frost's land at a high price when Frost moved to Vermont in 1920. Frost gave Holden a first edition of his 1923 publication New Hampshire, inscribed: "For Raymond from his friend in all and through all R.F." In 1931 Holden published a Profile of Robert Frost in The New Yorker.

== Career ==
Holden produced books, short stories, and poetry. Frost helped with his first publication in 1922 of Alabaster and Granite, a volume of 72 poems.

He contributed regularly to The New Yorker between 1929 and 1943, sometimes as co-author with James Thurber, Loney Haskell, E. B. White, Clifford Orr, Russell Maloney, Francis Steegmuller, or Harold Ross.

His poetry appeared in journals such as Poetry magazine and The Saturday Review of Literature, and in his volume Selected Poems published in 1946.

== Personal life ==
In 1918 or 1919 he married Grace Badger, and they had a son and a daughter.

By 1923 Holden had left his wife and family, and was soon living in New York with Louise Bogan, later US Poet Laureate, who had been widowed in 1920. They were then joined by her daughter, Maidie. Grace pursued a divorce in 1924, and on July 10, 1925, Holden became the second husband of Louise Bogan. The marriage was troubled and, like their previous relationships, did not last. Despite the personal turmoil, the 1920s and 1930s were Bogan's most productive poetic years.

They divorced in 1937 and later that year Holden married the poet and author Sara Henderson Hay. This marriage was also dissolved and he married again.

He moved to New Hampshire in 1951, where he was twice elected to the New Hampshire House of Representatives and was president of the New Hampshire Library Trustees Association.

In his final years he worked on an autobiography until he died from leukemia in 1972, leaving a widow, Barbara, and his two children.

== Selected bibliography ==
=== Poetry ===
- Granite and Alabaster (1922; pub. The MacMillan Company)
- Natural History (1938; pub. Henry Holt)
- The Arrow at the Heel (1940; pub. Henry Holt)
- Selected Poems (1946; pub. Henry Holt)
- The Last Fire-Haunted Spark (1961) - illus. John Melanson, pub. for the 200th anniversary of Newport, NH
- The Reminding Salt (1964; pub. Dodd, Mead & Co.)
- Passers-By (1918; pub. Henry holt)
