= The Wanderer (painting) =

1943 painting by George Grosz

- Artist: George Grosz
- Year: 1943
- Medium: Oil on canvas
- Dimensions: 76.2 cm × 101.6 cm (30.0 in × 40.0 in)
- Location: Memorial Art Gallery, Rochester

The Wanderer is an oil painting on canvas created by the German artist George Grosz. The painting was completed in 1943 and is currently on display at the Memorial Art Gallery in Rochester, New York.

== Visuals and Symbolism ==
=== Description ===
In the painting, an individual is represented in the middle wearing a long trench coat, boots, and a cane. With the depiction of wrinkles in the coat and his left hand clutching it to his chest, the painting displays the illusion of wind blowing from behind. A sorrowful expression is shown on the individual's face by the casting shadow over it and the downturned gaze. The path he walks down glows with the colors yellow, orange, and pink showing elements of water and mud as it reflects the explosion echoing in the background. Ravens fly close to the ground with lowered heads demonstrating the act of searching over the golden field to the left.

=== Symbolism ===
The figure traversing the scene represents the artist Grosz, portrayed with a cane and white hair, indicating his age at the time of the painting. Born on July 26, 1893, Grosz was 50 years old when The Wanderer was created in 1943. The explosion situated to the right serves as a powerful symbol of the devastation in Europe during World War II. The landscape, with its watery expanses and tall grass to the left, intricately mirrors the geographical features of Grosz's studio location in Cape Cod. The inclusion of these elements not only connects the artist to the broader narrative of war but also grounds the composition in the personal context of his creative space, adding layers of depth and meaning to the artistic portrayal.

== Progression ==
=== Context ===
The Wanderer is categorized within a group of Grosz's artworks described as 'hell pictures.' These paintings incorporate recurring elements such as fire, death, and darkness portraying an apocalyptic landscape. Many drawings created in the 1930s anticipated the arrival of the 'hell pictures' with two among them foreseeing The Wanderer.

The drawings are called Even Mud Has an End and No Let Up both of which were drawn by Grosz in 1936. These two sketches were part of a portfolio collection of 64 drawings called Interregnum and published by the Black Sun Press in New York in response to Adolf Hitler's preparedness for war.

=== Even Mud Has an End, 1936 ===
In the drawing, Grosz walks down a path of mud wearing a trench coat and holding a walking stick. The purpose and positioning of his hands are the same as in The Wanderer encompassing his left hand holding the coat and his right grasping the stick. Both faces reflect sorrowful expressions emphasized by Grosz looking down and having the shadow covering his eyes and face. The artworks also depict Grosz walking through water shown by the drop-shaped texture on his boots. The tall grass is also present to the left symbolizing the same characteristics of his studio location in Cape Cod. Both groups of ravens from the artworks are positioned above the grass, engaged in the act of searching. However, what they are searching for is exclusively depicted in the 1936 drawing. To the left within the enveloping surroundings lies a lifeless body upon which the ravens are feasting.

=== No Let Up, 1936 ===
In this drawing, there are differences including Grosz painted from behind, the left hand holding a candle lamp, and the depiction of rain with the sun or moon in the background. Nevertheless, some features in The Wanderer can still be seen including the cane held by Grosz's right hand, the path he walks on, the texture on his boots showing water, the long trench coat, and the tall grass to the right.

== Connection to the life of Grosz ==
=== Context ===
Grosz's life encompassed the trials of both World War I and World War II, alongside his struggle to grow as an artist within the confines of the German regime. In one of his autobiographies, translated by Nora Hodges, Grosz delves into the horrors of World War I and expresses what he felt about it as a growing artist. The filth, disease, mutilation, and brutality of the war had a large negative impact on Grosz. The Wanderer was painted as a personal response to World War II and during a phase of Grosz's life when his perspective underwent a profound transformation, a shift that is distinctly evident in the composition.

=== Shift in Artistic Perspective ===
Through these harsh experiences, Grosz used satirical caricatures to shed light on the corruption and violence around him. The Wanderer diverges from the art style of satirical cartoon drawings to embrace a more realistic and self-reflective approach. The shift is highlighted by two quotes depicted in the autobiography, A Little Yes and a Big No, and the book, George Grosz.

"My bitterness toward Germany was so great that I determined to leave everything behind me, to forget who and what I had been."

In this line from the autobiography, Grosz states his emotions about the negative experiences he has had in Germany and at this point decides to leave his home country and life as a satirist. The book, George Grosz, features an essay written by Grosz that illuminates his changing perspective and complements it with various artworks spanning his entire life.

“In the drawings I offer you in this book, you will see the record of an artist's growth. In former days, when I essayed political and social satire, I often felt its limitations... In all humility, I offer you the evidence that I have outgrown the satirical phase of my artistic development."

Grosz reflects on his growth out of satirical-styled art from his former years to something new. This transformative period is embedded in subsequent artworks, among them The Wanderer, with its style serving as a manifestation of this change. The notion of Grosz walking away was never hinted in any of his previous artworks which primarily sought to articulate his perspectives on corruption and violence through satirical caricatures. The uniqueness of The Wanderer lies in its departure from the cartoonish aesthetic, abstaining from direct attacks, and portraying Grosz walking away as opposed to engaging in confrontation.

== Ownership ==
The Wanderer was acquired originally by the Encyclopedia Britannica to become a part of its collection of contemporary American paintings. Subsequently, Senator William Benton purchased the painting from them in 1948, and it was later acquired once more by the Memorial Art Gallery, where it currently resides on display.
