= Clement Semmler =

Australian writer and television broadcaster

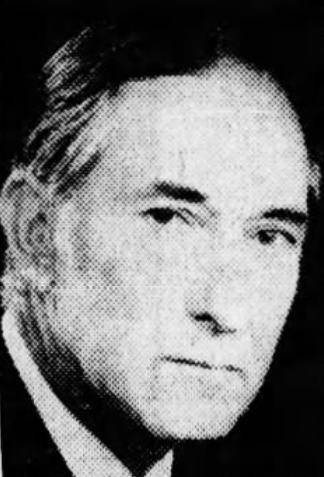
- Born: Clement William Semmler; 23 December 1914; Eastern Well, South Australia
- Died: 10 August 2000 (aged 85)
- Occupation(s): Author; Literary critic Broadcasting executive

Clement Semmler OBE, AM (23 December 1914 – 10 August 2000), often referred to as Clem Semmler, was an Australian author, literary critic, broadcaster and radio and television executive.

== Early life and education ==
Semmler was born Clement William Semmler on 23 December 1914 in Eastern Well, South Australia. His parents were Germans of the Lutheran faith. He studied at Murray Bridge High School. He continued his education at the University of Adelaide, graduating with a B.A. with honours in English language and literature, followed by an M.A., (Thesis: Thomas Hardy) in 1932.

== Career ==
=== Australian Broadcasting Commission ===
Semmler taught English and Latin at Unley High School, South Australia until 1942, when he joined the Australian Broadcasting Commission (ABC). He worked at the ABC for 35 years, rising to become the deputy general manager, from 1965 to 1977. He "helped launch ABC television" to which he introduced "famous programs" such as Four Corners, The Critics and Six O'Clock Rock.

When Semmler assumed control of programs at the ABC in the 1950s through 1970s, he "introduced jazz programs by Eric Child, Kym Bonython, Arch McKirdy, Ian Neil and others, and arranged regular programs from jazz groups all over Australia" and arranged "record-breaking concert tours by Australian jazz bands" (including those of Graeme Bell and Bob Barnard and the Australian Jazz Quintet).

Disenchanted with the new direction the ABC was taking, Semmler resigned in 1977.

=== Media reviewer and literary historian ===
During his years at the ABC, Semmler devoted much of his leisure time to writing numerous books and reviews. In 1966, Lansdowne Press published his study of the Australian poet Banjo Paterson, The Banjo of the Bush. Other books from Semmler in this period included studies of Barcroft Boake (1965), Kenneth Slessor (1966) and Douglas Stewart (1974).

After Semmler's departure from the ABC, he worked as a book reviewer for The Sydney Morning Herald for many years. He also wrote the "Semmler on Television" column for the same newspaper.

He moved to Bowral in the Southern Highlands of New South Wales, where he remained busy writing books, articles and letters to the editor and presenting a "regular jazz program on the local community FM station". Books written and edited in this period included The ABC: Aunt Sally and Sacred Cow (1981), The War Diaries of Kenneth Slessor (1985), and his memoirs, Pictures on the Margin (1991).

== Public service and retirement ==
During his retirement he also served as the Chairman of the Alexander Mackie CAE Council (1977–81), the Deputy Chairman of the Library Council of NSW (1981–83), a member of the Council of the Sydney College of Advanced Education (1982–84), one of the panel of judges for the NSW Premier's Literary Award, and the Chairman of the Board of the Sydney City Art Institute (1982–84).

Clement Semmler died in Bowral on 10 August 2000. His final book review was published in Quadrant just after he died. A note accompanying it says he "wrote more reviews for the magazine, over forty-three years, than anybody else".

The library of the University of New South Wales's College of Fine Arts is named the Clement Semmler Library in his honour.

== Personal life ==
Semmler was married twice. His first marriage was to Ella Janzow, with whom he had a daughter Jacqueline Dorn Semmler and a son Peter Clement Bronner Semmler, a barrister. His second marriage was to Catherine, with whom he had a daughter, creative producer and ecologist Imogen.

== Awards ==
In 1969, Semmler was awarded a D.Litt. by the University of New England "on the basis of his published works". For his contributions to Australian literature he received an Order of the British Empire in 1972 and was made a Member of the Order of Australia in 1989.

== Bibliography ==
=== Books as author ===
- For the Uncanny Man: Essays, Mainly Literary (1963)
- Barcroft Boake: Poet of the Stockwhip (1965)
- A. B. "Banjo" Paterson (1966)
- Kenneth Slessor (1966)
- The Art of Brian James and other Essays on Australian Literature (1972)
- Douglas Stewart (1974)
- The ABC: Aunt Sally and Sacred Cow (1981)
- Pictures on the Margin: Memoirs (1991) University of Queensland Press, St Lucia ISBN 0-7022-2411-1

=== Books as editor ===
- Literary Australia (with Derek Whitelock) (1966)
- Coast to Coast 1965-66 (1966)
- Twentieth Century Australian Literary Criticism (1967)
- A Frank Hardy Swag (1982)
- The War Diaries of Kenneth Slessor: Official Australian Correspondent 1940-1944 (1987)
- The War Despatches of Kenneth Slessor: Official Australian Correspondent 1940-1944 (1987)
- Bush Ballads, Poems, Stories and Journalism and The Collected Verse of Banjo Paterson (1992)

=== Reviews and critiques ===
Year	Media critique
1963	Semmler, Clement (March 1963). "Glimpses of World Television". Australian Quarterly. 35 (1): 58–67. doi:10.2307/20633851. JSTOR 20633851.
1991	Semmler, Clement (April 1991). "The (Abysmal) State of Australian Television". Quadrant. 35 (4): 10–20.

Year	Review article	Work(s) reviewed
1996	Semmler, Clement (May 1996). "The threefold Muggeridge". Quadrant. 40 (5): 83–84.	Wolfe, Gregory (1995). Malcolm Muggeridge : a biography. Hodder & Stoughton.

=== Articles ===
- "Bronner, Rudolph (Rudi) (1890–1960)", Australian Dictionary of Biography, 1993.
