= Christopher Brennan =

Australian poet, scholar and literary critic

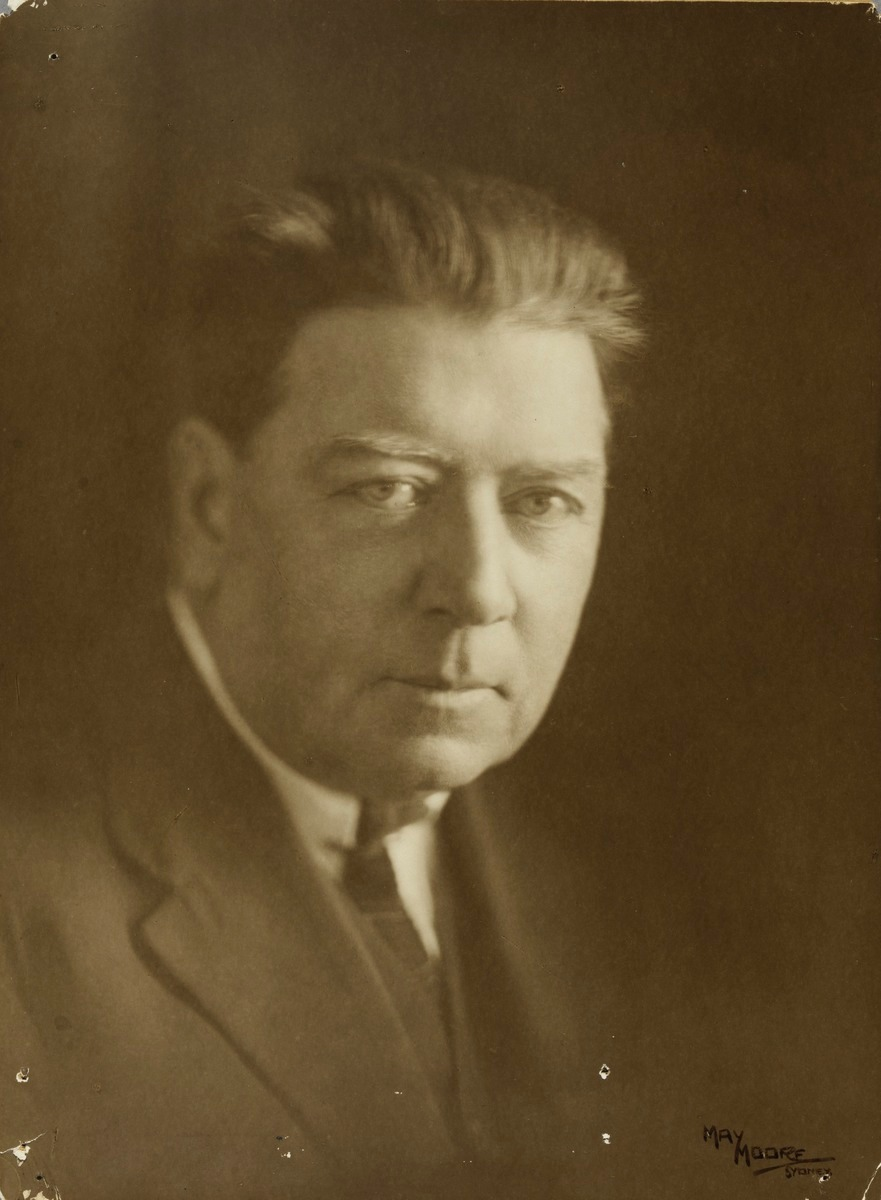
- Born: Christopher John Brennan; 1 November 1870; Haymarket, New South Wales, Australia
- Died: 5 October 1932 (aged 61); Lewisham, New South Wales, Australia
- Occupations: Poet; scholar; literary critic
- Writing career
- Notable works: Poems: 1913; The Prose of Christopher Brennan; The Verse of Christopher Brennan

Christopher John Brennan (1 November 1870 – 5 October 1932) was an Australian poet, scholar and literary critic.

== Biography ==
Brennan was born in Haymarket, an inner suburb of Sydney, to Christopher Brennan (d. 1919), a brewer, and his wife Mary Ann née Carroll (d. 1924), both Irish immigrants. His education took place at two schools in Sydney: he first attended St Aloysius' College, and after gaining a scholarship from Patrick Moran, he boarded at St Ignatius' College, Riverview.

Brennan entered the University of Sydney in 1888, taking up studies in the Classics, and won a travelling scholarship to Berlin. There he met his future wife, Anna Elisabeth Werth; there, also, he encountered the poetry of Stéphane Mallarmé. About this time, he decided to become a poet. In 1893 Brennan's article "On the Manuscripts of Aeschylus" appeared in The Journal of Philology. Brennan began forming a theory about the descent of Aeschylus' extant manuscripts in 1888.

Returning to Australia, Brennan took up a position as a cataloguer in the public library, before being given a position as assistant lecturer in French and German in the department of modern languages and literature and in 1920 the position of associate professor in German and comparative literature at the University of Sydney. In 1914, he produced his major work, Poems: 1913.

After Brennan's marriage broke up in 1922, he went to live with Violet Singer, the 'Vie' of his later poems, and, as a result of both his divorce and increasing drunkenness, he was removed from his position at the university in June 1925. The death of Singer in an accident in the same year left him distraught, and he spent most of his remaining years in poverty. Brennan died in 1932 from cancer.

== Legacy ==
Brennan influenced Australian writers of his own generation and many who succeeded him, including R. D. Fitzgerald, A. D. Hope, Judith Wright and James McAuley. In remembrance, the Fellowship of Australian Writers established the Christopher Brennan Award which is presented annually to "an Australian poet who has written work of sustained quality and distinction".

Brennan Hall and Library at St John's College within the University of Sydney, the Christopher Brennan building in the university's Arts Faculty, and the main library at Saint Ignatius' College, Riverview are named in his honour.

There was for several decades a Christopher Brennan Society "founded in... the 1970s by Axel Clark, Robin Marsden and John Fletcher", whose patrons included "some who knew Brennan: Professor A. R. Chisholm; Margaret Delmer; Professor Ralph Farrell; Sister Peter, of the Sisters of Charity; Walter Stone; Professor G. P. Shipp; Richard Pennington".

== Bibliography ==
=== Works by Brennan ===
- Sir Roger de Coverley, Selections from The Spectator (Sydney : Turner and Henderson, 1892). Edited with: A. B. Piddington. ISBN 978-1533275691
- XVIII Poems: Being the First Collection of Verse and Prose (Sydney : privately stylographed, 1897).
- XXI Poems 1893-1897 : Towards the Source (Sydney : Angus and Robertson, 1897).
- Fact and Idea (Sydney : Govt. Printer, 1899).
- From Blake to Arnold: Selections from English Poetry, 1783–1853 (London : Macmillan, 1900). Edited with: J. P. Pickburn & J. Le Gay Brereton.
- A Mask (Sydney : Sydney U. Women's College, 1913). With: J. Le Gay Brereton.
- Poems (Sydney : G. B. Philip and Son, 1914). Commonly referred to as Poems (1913).
- Passages for Translation into French and German (London : Oxford University Press, 1914). Compiled with: G. G. Nicholson.
- A Chant of Doom: and Other Verses (Sydney : Angus and Robertson, 1918).
- Twenty Three Poems (Sydney : Australian Limited Editions Society, 1938).
- The Burden of Tyre (Sydney : Harry F. Chaplin, 1953).
- The Verse of Christopher Brennan ed. by A. R. Chisholm and J. J. Quinn (Sydney : Angus and Robertson, 1960).
- The Prose of Christopher Brennan ed. by A. R. Chisholm and J. J. Quinn (Sydney : Angus and Robertson, 1962).
- Selected Poems of Christopher Brennan (Sydney : Angus and Robertson, 1965). Ed. by: A. R. Chisholm.
- Selected Poems of Christopher Brennan (Sydney : Angus and Robertson, 1973). Ed. by: G. A. Wilkes.
- Prose-Verse-Poster-Algebraic-Symbolico-Riddle Musicopoematographoscope & Pocket Musicopoematographoscope (Erskineville, NSW : Hale and Iremonger, 1981). Ed. by: Axel Clark. ISBN 9780908094882
- Terry Sturm, ed., Christopher Brennan, Edited with an Introduction and Notes ( St. Lucia, Qld: University of Queensland Press, 1984) (Portable Australian Authors series). ISBN 978-2747580007
- 13 Poems (Pearl Beach, NSW : Escutcheon Press, 1987). Ed. by: R. E. Summers.
- Interludes: Six Poems (Pearl Beach, NSW : Escutcheon Press, 1991). ISBN 9780958806633
- The Autumnal Glory of Valvins: Christopher Brennan on Mallarmé (Banora Point : Wind and Wave Press, 2007). Ed. by: Phillip A. Ellis.
- Like a Dream of Stone: Selected Verse Translations by Christopher Brennan (Banora Point : Wind and Wave Press, 2007). Ed. by: Phillip A. Ellis.

==== Selected list of poems ====
Title	Year	First published	Reprinted/collected in
"Towards the Source : 1894-97: 2"	1894		XXI Poems 1893-1897 : Towards the Source, Angus and Robertson, 1897, pp 8-9

=== Works about Brennan ===
- Katherine Barnes, The Higher Self in Christopher Brennan’s Poems: Esotericism, Romanticism, Symbolism, Leiden: Brill, 2006. ISBN 978-9004152212
- Alan Rowland Chisholm, Christopher Brennan: The Man and his Poetry, Sydney: Angus & Robertson, 1946.
- Alan Rowland Chisholm, Study of Christopher Brennan's "Forest of Night", Melbourne University Press, 1970. ISBN 978-0522839562
- Axel Clark, Christopher Brennan: A Critical Biography, Melbourne University Press, 1980.
- T. Inglis Moore, Six Australian Poets: Hugh McCrae, Shaw Neilson, Bernard O'Dowd, William Baylebridge, Christopher Brennan, R. D. FitzGerald, Melbourne, Robertson & Mullens, 1942.
- Simone Kadi, Christopher Brennan, poète, Université de Nanterre 1994.
- Simone Kadi, ed. and tr., Christopher Brennan: Introduction suivie de 12 poèmes – textes et traductions – avec commentaires, Paris: Editions L'Harmattan, 2005 (Poètes des Cinq Continents).
- Richard Pennington, Christopher Brennan: Some Recollections, Sydney: Angus & Robertson, 1970. Foreword by G. A. Wilkes.
- Walter W. Stone and Hugh Anderson, Christopher John Brennan: A Comprehensive Bibliography with Annotations, Cremorne (N.S.W.), Stone Copying Company, 1959 (Studies in Australian Bibliography, No. 9).

== See also ==
- List of Australian poets
