= Barcroft Boake (poet) =

Australian poet (1866–1892)

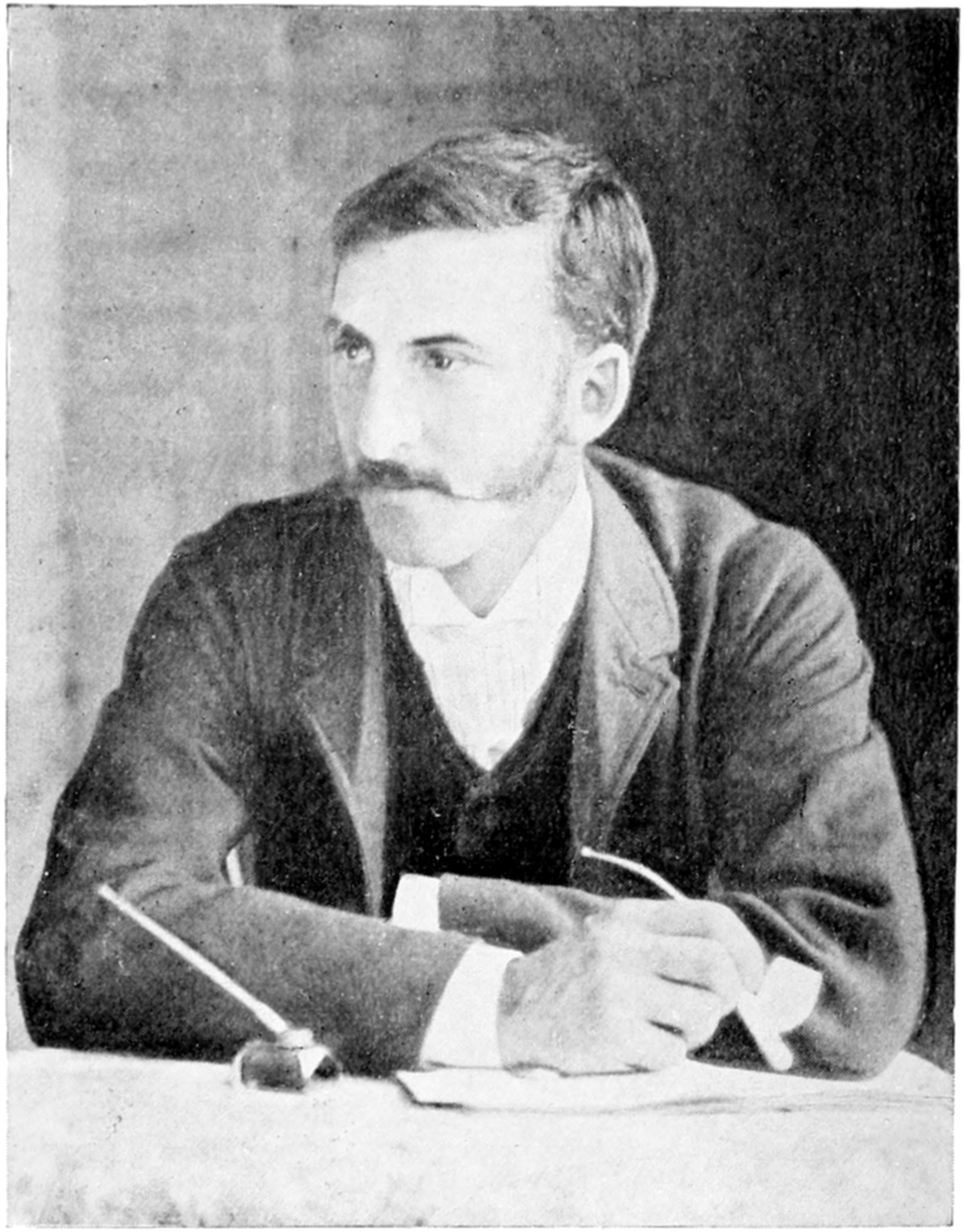
- Born: Barcroft Henry Thomas Boake; 26 March 1866; Balmain, New South Wales
- Died: 2 May 1892 (aged 26); Long Bay, North Sydney, New South Wales
- Relatives: Barcroft Capel Boake (father); Capel Boake (niece)
- Writing career
- Language: English
- Years active: 1890–1892
- Genre: Bush poetry
- Notable work: "Where the Dead Men Lie"
- Literary movement: Bulletin School

Barcroft Henry Thomas Boake (26 March 1866 – 2 May 1892) was an Australian stockman and poet who wrote primarily within the bush poetry tradition. He was active for only a few years before his suicide at the age of 26.

Boake was born in Sydney to Irish-born professional photographer Barcroft Capel Boake; his mother died when he was thirteen. Educated at private schools, including a brief period in New Caledonia, Boake left home at the age of 17 and was apprenticed as a surveyor's draughtsman. He disliked clerical work and in 1886 moved to the Monaro to work as an assistant surveyor. He later worked as a boundary rider and drover in the Outback. He returned to Sydney in early 1892 and hanged himself with a stockwhip a few months later.

Boake was first published in late 1890 and regularly appeared in The Bulletin prior to his death, with the posthumous publication of Where the Dead Men Lie, and Other Poems in 1897 bringing his work to a wider audience. His poems feature Outback settings and many of his best received works incorporate the subject of death. "Where the Dead Men Lie" is one of Australia's most anthologised poems and popularised the term "Never Never" as a nickname for the Outback. Contemporary reviewers of Boake found his work to be inconsistent, but identified elements of brilliance and lamented his early death.

== Biography ==
=== Childhood ===
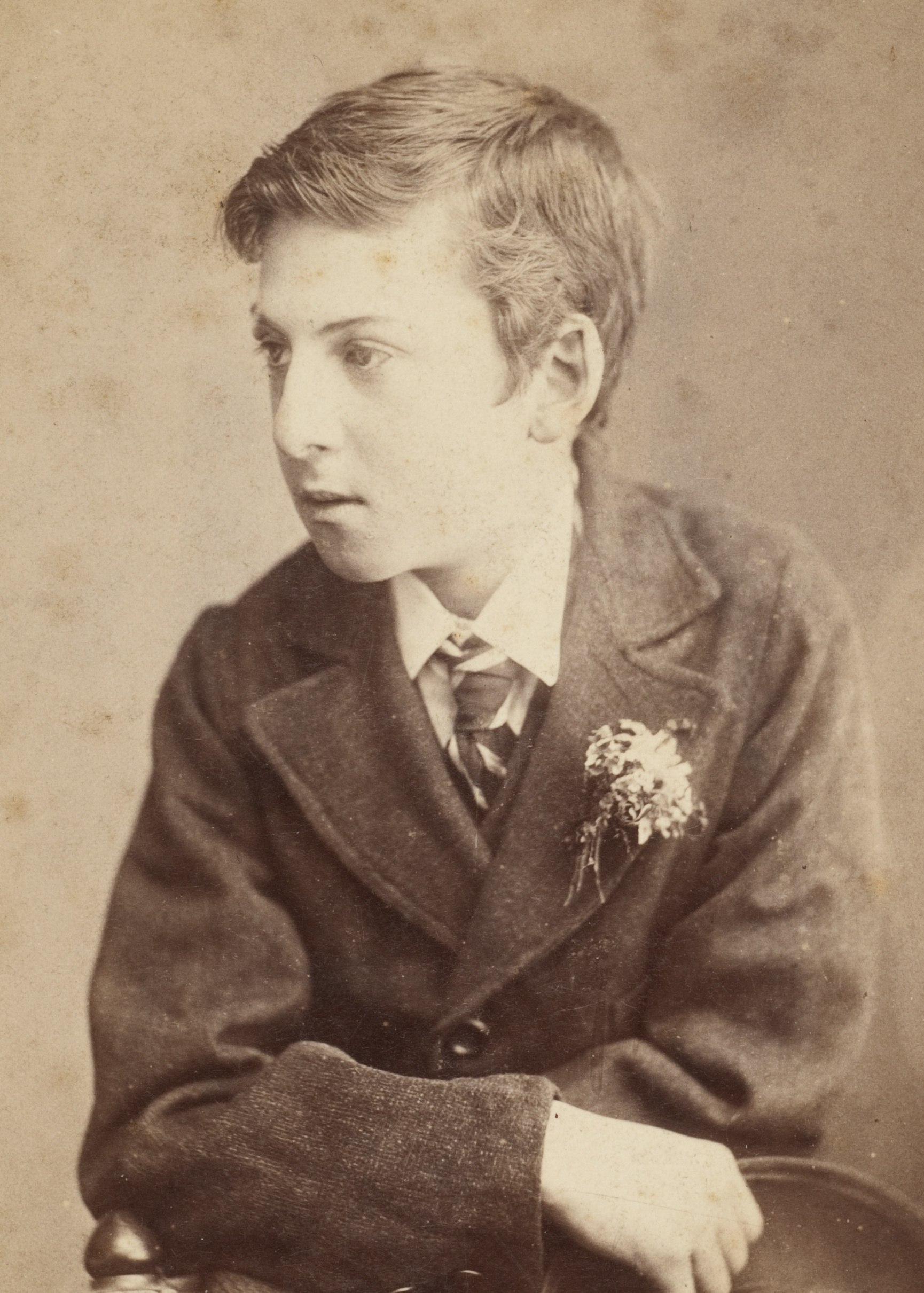
Photograph of Boake by his father, around the age of 14

Boake was born on 26 March 1866 in his parents' home at Waterview Bay in Balmain, New South Wales. He was the first child of Florence Eva (née Clarke) and Barcroft Capel Boake. His father was born in Ireland and arrived in the colony of Victoria in 1857. He moved to Sydney in 1862 where he was a professional photographer, initially with Freeman Bros and then with his own studio. His mother was born in Australia, the daughter of an East India Company sailor.

Boake's father established his own photography studio shortly after his son's birth, and the family settled at Lavender Bay on Sydney's North Shore. He had eight younger siblings, of whom three died in infancy. Boake grew up on Sydney Harbour and was a good swimmer and boatsman. As a child he was known as "Bartie". At the age of eight he fell through a window leaving a permanent scar running from his eyelid to his scalp. As he grew older he would explore the then-wilderness of the Middle Harbour on foot, horseback or afloat, with friends or alone. He stood around 5 feet 8 inches (1.73 m), according to his father being "of medium stature and slight build although strong and hardy".

Boake began his education at a day school in Milsons Point. In 1876, aged 10, he was sent to live in the French colony of New Caledonia for 18 months, boarding with his father's friend Allan Hughan who had been appointed government photographer in Nouméa. He was "put to a French school and made to learn the language", in which he became proficient. He returned to his family in 1878, with Assimul, a young Kanak boy who subsequently worked in Boake's father's studio for two years. Before their departure Assimul had given Boake a tattoo of his mother's initials.

By the time Boake returned to Australia, his family had moved a short distance to North Willoughby. His mother died of puerperal fever in November 1879 after delivering twin sons, one of whom died a month later; the other was born with a mental disability and died as a teenager. After his mother's death his maternal grandmother Matilda Clarke moved in with the family and took over running the household.

Boake attended Sydney Grammar School for two terms in 1878, but changed schools due to the difficulty of reaching the campus from the North Shore. He was subsequently sent to a private school in Hunter Street run by Edward Blackmore, which he attended for five years until the age of seventeen. According to Boake's entry in the Australian Dictionary of Biography, his father "profoundly distrusted state schools" and schooled his son accordingly.

=== Adulthood ===
After leaving school, Boake was apprenticed to James Reece as a draughtsman where he learned technical drawing. In March 1885 he passed the government examination and was employed as a temporary draughtsman in the Survey Office on £120 per year (equivalent to $19,000 in 2022). His father later recalled that he "became very weary at his office life and of the hopeless inactivity of his fellow clerks". At the age of 18, Boake inherited a then-significant sum of £200 (equivalent to $31,000 in 2022), half of which was lost gambling on horse racing and half of which was lent to Reece and never recovered. He was extremely distressed when he had to reveal the losses to his father and considered the situation to be the main driver in him leaving Sydney for the country. In July 1886 Boake took up a position as a field assistant to Edwin Commins, based out of Adaminaby on the Monaro. He developed a friendship with the McKeahnie family of Rosedale Station, which comprised Alexander and Mary McKeahnie and their six children, including Charlie McKeahnie who has been identified as a possible model for Banjo Paterson's "The Man from Snowy River".

Boake's term with Commins ended in August 1888, after which he took work as a station hand at Mullah Station near Trangie. His responsibilities included sheep shearing, mustering, and drafting, and he also learned some wool classing. Mullah experienced a drought over the Australian summer of 1888–89, and in a letter to his father Boake recalled his experience fighting a bush fire. However, he became dissatisfied with the slow pace of station life during the off-season, finding himself unoccupied for hours each day.

By May 1889 Boake had left Mullah Station and headed north to Queensland to seek droving work, moving cattle across the Outback between pastoral leases or to processing facilities. His first assignment saw him join a gang taking 1,100 of James Rutherford's cattle from Davenport Downs Station on the Diamantina River south to another of his properties south of Cunnamulla. In May 1890, Boake joined W. A. Lipscomb, a surveyor, and remained with him until the end of 1891. About this time he began to send verses to The Bulletin, which were published. Boake's term with Lipscomb ended in December 1891, after which he returned to Sydney to live with his father.

=== Death ===
Boake is believed to have died by suicide. His body was found hanging by the neck from a stockwhip at Long Bay, North Sydney, eight days after he disappeared on 2 May 1892. Boake was interred at St Thomas' Cemetery with his mother and siblings. His grave was initially unmarked, as his father had no money, but in 1897 Boake's publisher A. G. Stephens arranged for the grave to be kerbed and turfed and for a headstone to be erected. One writer on Boake's life has mentioned that the suicide took place during the 1891–93 depression when the poet was unable to find work, also noting that "it has been suggested that he killed himself for the love of one of the McKeahnie girls", sisters of the horseman Charlie McKeahnie.

== Poetry ==
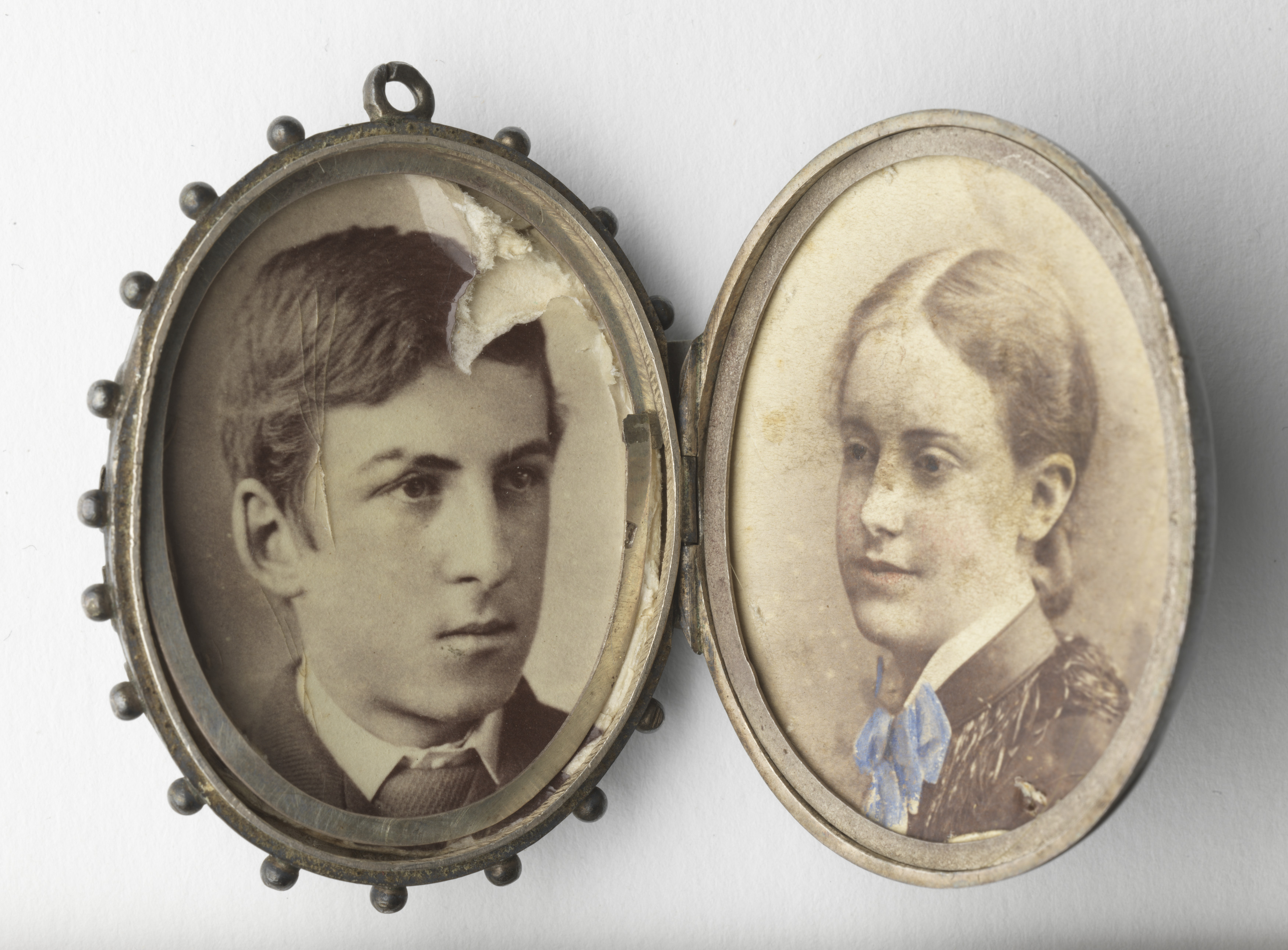
Locket portraits c. 1884 of Boake and Matilda Kate Rout, to whom his earliest surviving verse was dedicated

Boake developed an interest in poetry through his father, who described himself as "fond of stringing rhymes" and had several ballads and odes appear in local publications. As a child he and his father would collaborate by each writing alternative lines of poetry. He read widely, with his influences including Australian writers Adam Lindsay Gordon, Marcus Clarke and Rolf Boldrewood. Boake's earliest surviving poem is a four-line verse dedicated to Matilda Kate Rout, a photographic colourist five years his senior with whom he became close in 1883. It was placed in a locket together with photographs of the pair, with Rout retaining the locket until her death. It was donated to the Mitchell Library by Rout's daughter in 1962.

"Where the Dead Men Lie" has been described as Boake's "signature poem". It is one of the most anthologised Australian poems, appearing in numerous national anthologies in the 20th and 21st centuries, although few other Boake poems have featured. It helped popularise the term "Never Never" as a term for the Australian outback. Boake's 1892 poem "Jimmy Wood" has been cited by The Australian National Dictionary as the origin of the term "Jimmy Woodser" for a person drinking alone in a pub.

=== Themes ===
A number of Boake's poems concern death, with their subjects either dying or musing on the prospects of divine judgment and an afterlife. Ian Mair, literary critic for The Age, placed Boake in Romantic poetry's tradition of "loving death" but concluded that Boake's "personality and career were overshadowed by mortality and its images".

=== Publication history ===
No collection of Boake's works was published during his lifetime and there are no authoritative versions of several of his poems. Bulletin literary critic Alfred Stephens adopted the role of literary executor and edited Where the Dead Men Lie, and Other Poems, which was published by Angus & Robertson in 1897 as part of a series on Australian poets. The collection, which included a brief biography, was reprinted twice and reportedly sold over 2,000 copies. A second edition, also edited by Stephens, was published in 1913, with four additional poems included and some previous notes altered or removed. Clement Semmler published a brief biography of Boake in 1966, while later efforts include a semi-fictionalised biography by Hugh Capel published in 2002, and an expanded collection and biography by Bill Refshauge published in 2007.

Stephens' role as Boake's editor and literary executor has been scrutinised by later writers. In the 1960s, Semmler alleged in Australian Literary Studies that Stephens had removed entire passages of Boake's original works and substituted his own verse. Semmler's conclusions were disputed in a response by Stephens' daughter Alison. Stephens also sold off some of Boake's papers – including manuscripts for published poems – as he experienced financial difficulties later in life, which are now considered lost.

Boake wrote under the name "Surcingle" – a component of horse tack – until early 1892, only months before his death. Owing to his use of a pseudonym and an absence of original manuscripts, editors have faced attribution difficulties and a number of poems have been wrongly attributed to Boake in various publications.

=== Reception ===
James Brunton Stephens praised Boake and endorsed the comments of a reviewer in The Queenslander that Boake "could express the most dreadful sentiments in a way that might almost be termed pleasant".

However, Cecil Hadgraft, the author of Boake's Australian Dictionary of Biography entry, observed that it was "at least arguable that he died when he had written his best poetry".

== Bibliography ==
- Where the Dead Men Lie, and Other Poems (1897)

=== Selected list of poems ===
Title	Year	First published	Reprinted/collected in
"Jack's Last Muster"	1890	The Sydney Mail, 13 December 1890	Where the Dead Men Lie, and Other Poems, Angus and Robertson, 1897, pp. 4-8
"Where the Dead Men Lie"	1891	The Bulletin, 19 December 1891	Where the Dead Men Lie, and Other Poems, Angus and Robertson, 1897, pp. 140-142

== Sources ==
- Refshauge, Bill (2007). Barcroft Boake: Collected Works, Edited, with a Life. Australian Scholarly Publishing. ISBN 9781740971539.
- Semmler, Clement (1965). Barcroft Boake: Poet of the Stockwhip. Lansdowne Press.

Journal articles

- Refshauge, Bill (2006). "Fresh Light on A.G. Stephens as editor of Barcroft Boake's works". Australian Literary Studies. 22 (3).
- Semmler, Clement (1968). "A. G. Stephens as Editor of Barcroft Boake's Poems". Australian Literary Studies. 3 (3).
