= Juha Harju =

Finnish heavy metal musician (born 1981)

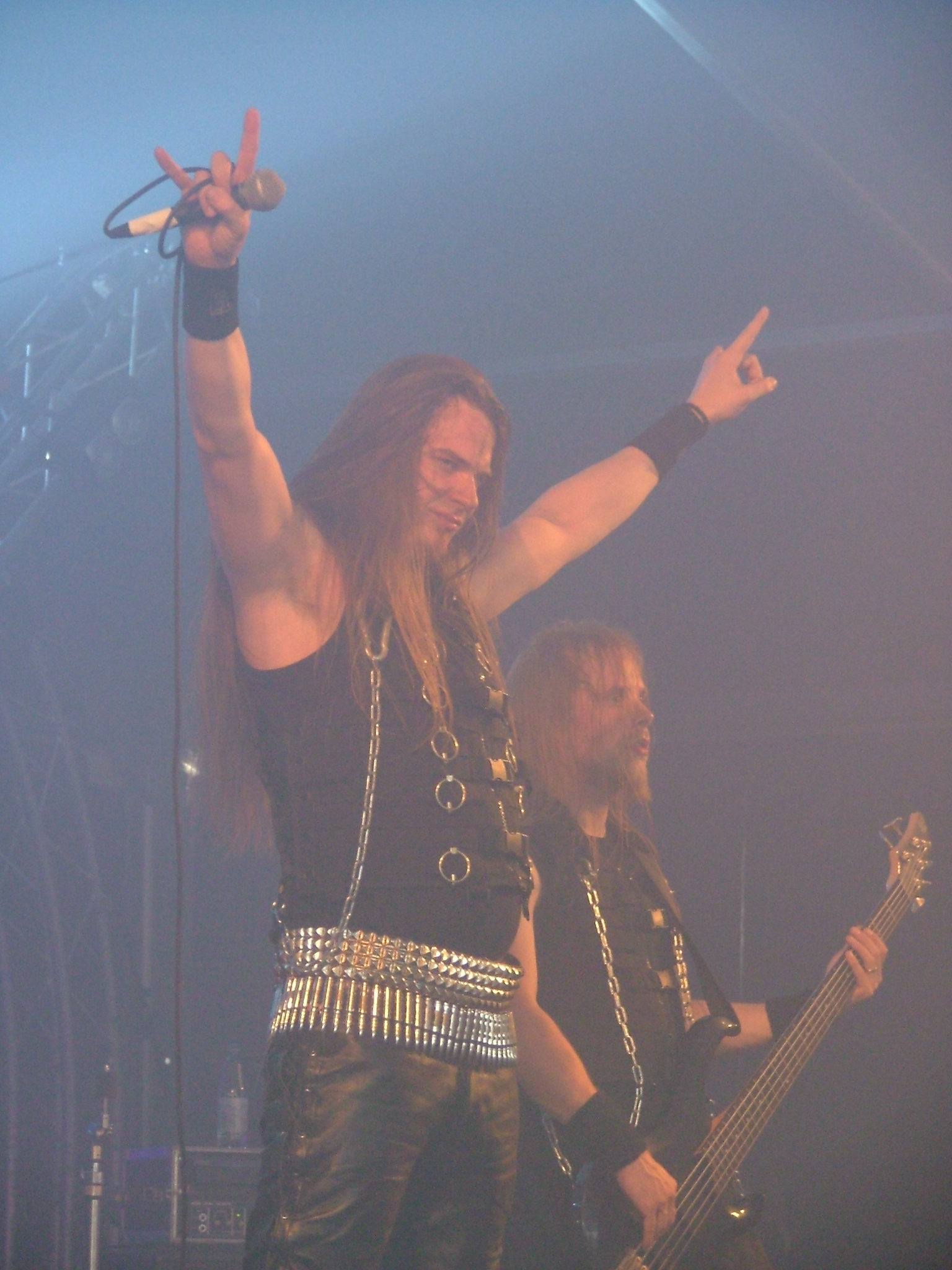
Juha Harju (left) at Tuska Open Air 2008

Juha Harju (born 1981 in Kuopio) is a Finnish heavy metal musician. He was the vocalist of the Finnish black metal band Shade Empire and metal band Chaosweaver (Cypher Commander). He also plays bass in black metal bands Ajattara (under the alias Tohtori Kuolio) and Deathchain (under the alias Kuolio). He has named Ozzy Osbourne and Chuck Schuldiner as his favourite musicians.
