= 1902 in Australian literature =

This article presents a list of the historical events and publications of Australian literature during 1902.

== Books ==
- Louis Becke – Breachley, Black Sheep
- Rolf Boldrewood – The Ghost Camp, or, The Avengers
- Guy Boothby
  - The Childerbridge Mystery
  - The Curse of the Snake
  - The Kidnapped President
- Louise Mack – An Australian Girl in London
- Rosa Praed – The Insane Root: A Romance of a Strange Country
- Ethel Turner – The Raft in the Bush

== Short stories ==
- Barbara Baynton – Bush Studies
- Louis Becke — The Strange Adventure of James Shervinton and Other Stories
- Henry Lawson
  - "A Child in the Dark, and a Foreign Father"
  - Children of the Bush
  - "Send Round the Hat"
- A. B. Paterson — "Sitting in Judgement : A Show Ring Sketch"

== Poetry ==
- E. J. Brady – The Earthen Floor
- Breaker Morant and Frank Renar – Bushman and Buccaneer: Harry Morant: His 'Ventures and Verses
- Breaker Morant – "Butchered to Make a Dutchman's Holiday"
- A. B. Paterson
  - "The Old Australian Ways"
  - Rio Grande's Last Race and Other Verses
- Victor J. Daley – "The Woman at the Washtub"
- J. Brunton Stephens – The Poetical Works of Brunton Stephens

== Drama ==
- Charles Haddon Chambers
  - The Awakening: A Play in Four Acts
  - The Open Gate: An Original Domestic Drama in One Act

== Biography ==
- J. H. M. Abbott – Tommy Cornstalk : Being Some Account of the Less Notable Features of the South African War from the Point of View of the Australian Ranks

== Births ==
A list, ordered by date of birth (and, if the date is either unspecified or repeated, ordered alphabetically by surname) of births in 1902 of Australian literary figures, authors of written works or literature-related individuals follows, including year of death.

- 22 February – Robert D. Fitzgerald, poet (died 1987)
- 2 May – Alan Marshall, novelist (died 1984)
- 16 July — Dorothy Cottrell, children's author, journalist, novelist (died 1957)
- 17 July – Christina Stead, novelist (died 1983)
- 19 July – Ada Verdun Howell, poet and writer (died 1981)
- 20 July – Gilbert Mant, journalist and writer (died 1997)
- 2 September — Florence James, novelist, literary agent (died 1993)
- 21 September – Dymphna Cusack, novelist (died 1981)

== Deaths ==
A list, ordered by date of death (and, if the date is either unspecified or repeated, ordered alphabetically by surname) of deaths in 1902 of Australian literary figures, authors of written works or literature-related individuals follows, including year of birth.

- 19 January — Philip Holdsworth, poet (born 1851)
- 15 February – Arthur Patchett Martin, writer and editor (born 1851)
- 27 February – Breaker Morant, poet (born 1864)
- 29 June – James Brunton Stephens, poet and editor (born 1835)
- 9 August – Alexander Sutherland, educator, writer and philosopher (born 1852)

== See also ==
- 1902 in Australia
- 1902 in literature
- 1902 in poetry
- List of years in Australian literature
- List of years in literature
