= 1900 in Australian literature =

This article presents a list of the historical events and publications of Australian literature during 1900.

== Events ==
- April - Henry Lawson departs Australia for London in order to further his literary career. The venture proved ultimately unsuccessful.

== Books ==
- Louis Becke
  - Edward Barry: South Sea Pearler
  - Tom Wallis: A Tale of the South Seas
- Guy Boothby
  - A Cabinet Secret
  - "Long Live the King!"
  - A Maker of Nations
  - My Indian Queen
  - A Prince of Swindlers (aka The Viceroy's Protegé)
  - The Woman of Death
- Ada Cambridge – Path and Goal
- Simpson Newland – Blood Tracks of the Bush: An Australian Romance
- A. B. Paterson – An Outback Marriage
- Ethel Turner – Three Little Maids

== Short stories ==
- Edward Dyson – "The Funerals of Malachi Mooney"
- Henry Lawson
  - "The Iron-Bark Chip"
  - "Joe Wilson's Courtship"
  - On the Track
  - Over the Sliprails
- Steele Rudd – "On Our Selection" (later retitled "Baptising Bartholomew")

== Poetry ==
- Ethel Castilla – The Australian Girl, and Other Verses
- Victor J. Daley – "When London Calls"
- George Essex Evans – "Ode for Commonwealth Day"
- James Hebblethwaite – A Rose of Regret
- Henry Lawson – Verses, Popular and Humorous
- Bernard O'Dowd – "Australia"
- A.B. Paterson – "There's Another Blessed Horse Fell Down"

== Drama ==
- C. Haddon Chambers – The Tyranny of Tears: A Comedy in Four Acts
- Gilbert Murray – Andromache: A Play in Three Acts

== Births ==
A list, ordered by date of birth (and, if the date is either unspecified or repeated, ordered alphabetically by surname) of births in 1900 of Australian literary figures, authors of written works or literature-related individuals follows, including year of death.

- 8 April – Marie Byles, travel writer and non-fiction writer (Manchester, UK) (died 1979)
- 20 May – Frances Margaret McGuire, writer, biochemist and philanthropist (died 1995)
- 28 May — Nan Chauncy, writer for children (died 1970)
- 10 August – Charles Shaw, novelist (died 1955)
- 13 August – A. A. Phillips, writer and critic (died 1985)
- 20 October – Jack Lindsay, journalist, novelist and poet (died 1990)

== Deaths ==
A list, ordered by date of death (and, if the date is either unspecified or repeated, ordered alphabetically by surname) of deaths in 1900 of Australian literary figures, authors of written works or literature-related individuals follows, including year of birth.

- 2 February — Henry Hamilton Blackham, poet (born 1817, Northern Ireland)
- 5 October — William Dymock, bookseller (born 1861)
- 30 October – Charles de Boos, journalist and novelist (born 1819)

== See also ==
- 1900 in Australia
- 1900 in literature
- 1900 in poetry
- List of years in Australian literature
- List of years in literature
