= 1904 in Australian literature =

This article presents a list of the historical events and publications of Australian literature during 1904.

== Books ==
- Louis Becke – Tom Gerrard
- Guy Boothby
  - A Bid for Freedom
  - A Bride from the Sea
  - A Consummate Scoundrel
  - A Desperate Conspiracy
  - An Ocean Secret
- Ada Cambridge – Sisters: A Novel
- G. B. Lancaster – Sons O' Men
- Louise Mack – Children of the Sun
- Rosa Praed – Nyria
- Ethel Turner – Mother's Little Girl

== Short stories ==
- Louis Becke – Under Tropic Skies
- Mabel Forrest – The Rose of Forgiveness and Other Stories
- Laura Palmer-Archer – A Bush Honeymoon and Other Stories
- Banjo Paterson – "The Oracle at the Races"
- Steele Rudd – Sandy's Selection
- Ethel Turner – "The Carrying of the Baby"

== Poetry ==
- Victor J. Daley
  - "Anacreon"
  - "Moderation"
  - "Over the Wine"
  - "The Parson and the Prelate"
- George Essex Evans – "A Drought Idyll"
- John Farrell – My Sundowner and Other Poems
- Henry Lawson
  - "The Ballad of the Elder Son"
  - "The Last Review"
  - "New Life, New Love"
- Louisa Lawson
  - "Back Again"
  - "Coming Home"
- Will Lawson – "Shelling Peas"
- Furnley Maurice – Some More Verses

== Births ==
A list, ordered by date of birth (and, if the date is either unspecified or repeated, ordered alphabetically by surname) of births in 1904 of Australian literary figures, authors of written works or literature-related individuals follows, including year of death.

- 1 January – George Landen Dann, playwright (died 1977)
- 29 January – John Morrison, short story writer (died 1998)
- 11 March – Hope Spencer, poet (died 1969)
- 11 April — Cyril Pearl, Australian journalist, editor, author, social historian, wit and television personality (died 1987)
- 13 June – John K. Ewers, poet and novelist (died 1978)
- 1 September – Eve Langley, Australian-New Zealand novelist and poet (died 1974)

== Deaths ==
A list, ordered by date of death (and, if the date is either unspecified or repeated, ordered alphabetically by surname) of deaths in 1904 of Australian literary figures, authors of written works or literature-related individuals follows, including year of birth.

- 8 January – John Farrell, poet (born 1851, Buenos Aires, Argentina)
- 9 February – Jennings Carmichael, poet and writer (born 1867)

== See also ==
- 1904 in Australia
- 1904 in literature
- 1904 in poetry
- List of years in Australian literature
- List of years in literature
