= Three Little Maids (disambiguation) =

Three Little Maids is a 1902 Edwardian musical comedy by Paul Rubens.

Three Little Maids may also refer to:

- Three Little Maids, a 1900 children's novel by Ethel Turner
- The Three Little Maids, a 1930s American musical group
- "Three Little Maids from School Are We", a song from the 1885 comic opera The Mikado
