= List of acts of the Legislative Council of Victoria from 1856 =

This is a list of acts of the Legislative Council of Victoria, Australia for the year 1856.

== 1856 ==
Short title, or popular name	Citation	Royal assent
Long title
	19 Vict. No. 2	29 January 1856
An Act to alter the laws relating to Bills of Exchange Promissory Notes and certain other securities and to facilitate the remedies thereon. (Repealed by Instruments and Securities Statute 1864 (27 Vict. No. 204))
	19 Vict. No. 3	5 February 1856
An Act to continue for a limited period an Act intituled "An Act to prevent the influx of Criminals into Victoria." (Note: 18 Vict. No. 3) (Repealed by Crimes Act 1890 (54 Vict. No. 1079))
	19 Vict. No. 4	12 February 1856
An Act to amend the law respecting Defamatory Words and Libel. (Repealed by Statute of Wrongs 1865 (28 Vict. No. 251))
	19 Vict. No. 5	12 February 1856
An Act to re-enact an Act intituled "An Act to authorise for a limited period an Assessment on Stock." (Note: 17 Vict. No. 20) (Repealed by 12 Vict. No. 47)
	19 Vict. No. 6	27 February 1856
An Act to repeal so much of an Act intituled, "An Act more effectually to promote the erection of Buildings for Public Worship and to provide for the maintenance of Ministers of Religion in the Colony of Victoria," (Note: 16 Vict. No. 28) as relates to any grant of money out of the General Revenue. (Repealed by Religious Trusts Statute 1865 (28 Vict. No. 244))
	19 Vict. No. 7	27 February 1856
An Act to amend an Act intituled "An Act to regulate the Conveyance of Passengers to Victoria." (Note: 18 Vict. No. 5) (Repealed by Passengers Harbors and Navigation Statute 1865 (28 Vict. No. 255))
	19 Vict. No. 8	27 February 1856
An Act to amend an Act intituled "An Act for Volunteer Corps in Victoria." (Note: 18 Vict. No. 7) (Repealed by Volunteer Statute 1864 (27 Vict. No. 205))
	19 Vict. No. 9	27 February 1856
An Act to amend an Act intituled "An Act to restrain the careless use of Fire." (Note: 17 Vict. No. 8) (Repealed by 21 Vict. No. 55)
	19 Vict. No. 10	10 March 1856
An Act to amend an Act (Note: 18 Vict. No. 31) intituled "An Act to amend an Act (Note: 17 Vict. No. 30) intituled 'An Act to amend the Law relating to the Post Office. (Repealed by Post Office Statute 1864 (27 Vict. No. 226))
Election Proceedings Regulation Act 1856 (repealed)	19 Vict. No. 11	19 March 1856
An Act to provide for the better regulation of proceedings at Elections of Members of the Legislative Council and Legislative Assembly of Victoria respectively. (Repealed by Electoral Act 1863 (27 Vict. No. 168))
Electoral Act 1856 (repealed)	19 Vict. No. 12	19 March 1856
An Act to provide for the Election of Members to serve in the Legislative Council and Legislative Assembly of Victoria respectively. (Repealed by Constitution Act Amendment Act 1890 (54 Vict. No. 1075))
	19 Vict. No. 13	19 March 1856
An Act to amend an Act intituled "An Act to make provision for the better Administration of Justice in the Colony of Victoria." (Note: 15 Vict. No. 10) (Repealed by Supreme Court Act 1890 (54 Vict. No. 1142))
	19 Vict. No. 14	19 March 1856
An Act to make provision for the eradication of certain Thistle Plants and the Bathurst Burr. (Repealed by Thistle Prevention Statute 1865 (28 Vict. No. 250))
	19 Vict. No. 15	19 March 1856
An Act to enable the Government of Victoria to purchase all the property and other interests possessed by "The Melbourne Mount Alexander and Murray River Railway Company." (Repealed by Public Works Statute 1865 (29 Vict. No. 289))
	19 Vict. No. 16	19 March 1856
An Act to amend an Act intituled "An Act for the establishment of Municipal Institutions in Victoria." (Note: 18 Vict. No. 15) (Repealed by Municipal Corporations Act 1863 (27 Vict. No. 184))
	19 Vict. No. 17	19 March 1856
An Act for applying certain sums arising from the Revenue receivable in Victoria to the Service thereof for the year One thousand eight hundred and fifty-six and for further appropriating the said revenue.
	19 Vict. No. 18	19 March 1856
An Act to amend an Act intituled "An Act for applying certain sums arising from the Revenue receivable in the Colony of Victoria to the service thereof for the year One thousand eight hundred and fifty-five and for further appropriating the said Revenue." (Note: 18 Vict. No. 35)
Common Law Practice Act 1856 (repealed)	19 Vict. No. 19	19 March 1856
An Act to alter and simplify the Practice and mode of Procedure in an Action at Law and for other purposes in relation thereto. (Repealed by Supreme Court Act 1890 (54 Vict. No. 1142))
Trustee Act 1856 (repealed)	19 Vict. No. 20	20 March 1856
An Act for adopting and applying portions of certain Acts of the Imperial Parliament passed in the Sessions of the thirteenth and fourteenth (Note: Trustee Act 1850 (13 & 14 Vict. c. 60 (Imp))) and in the fifteenth and sixteenth (Note: Trustee Act 1852 (15 & 16 Vict. c. 55 (Imp))) years of the Reign of Her Majesty Queen Victoria in the administration of Justice in Victoria. (Repealed by Statute of Trusts 1864 (28 Vict. No. 234))
	19 Vict. No. 21	20 March 1856
An Act to provide for the Registration of Imported Stock. (Repealed by 51 Vict. No. 925)
Bank of Victoria Explanatory Act 1856	19 Vict.	1 February 1856
An Act to explain the provisions of an Act (Note: Bank of Victoria Act 1854 (17 Vict.)) incorporating the Proprietors of the Bank of Victoria.
	19 Vict.	27 February 1856
An Act to authorise the Admission of Alexander Keefer to practise as a Barrister in the Supreme Court of the Colony of Victoria.
Studley Park Bridge Act 1856	19 Vict.	3 March 1856
An Act to incorporate a Company to be called "The Studley Park Bridge Company" and to enable the said Company to erect and maintain a Bridge over the River Yarra Yarra at Church-street East Collingwood and to take Toll thereat and for other purposes.
Victoria Fire and Marine Insurance Company's Act 1856	19 Vict.	3 March 1856
An Act to enable the shareholders and members of a certain Joint Stock Insurance Company carrying on business in the Colony of Victoria under the name style and firm of "The Victoria Fire and Marine Insurance Company" to sue and be sued in the name of the Chairman for the time being of the Board of Directors of the said Company and for other purposes therein mentioned.
Colonial Bank of Australasia Act 1856 or the Colonial Bank of Australasia Incorporation Act 1856	19 Vict.	19 March 1856
An Act to incorporate the Proprietors of a certain Banking Company to be called "The Colonial Bank of Australasia" and for other purposes.
	19 Vict.	19 March 1856
An Act to authorise the Melbourne and Hobson's Bay Railway Company to make a Branch Railway from their present Railway to St. Kilda and to amend their Act of Incorporation (Note: 16 Vict.) and to extend the powers therein contained and for other purposes. (Repealed by 42 Vict. No. 617)

== Sources ==
- "1856 Victorian Historical Acts". AustLII.
