= Reginald Newton =

Australian Army officer

Reginald William Newton
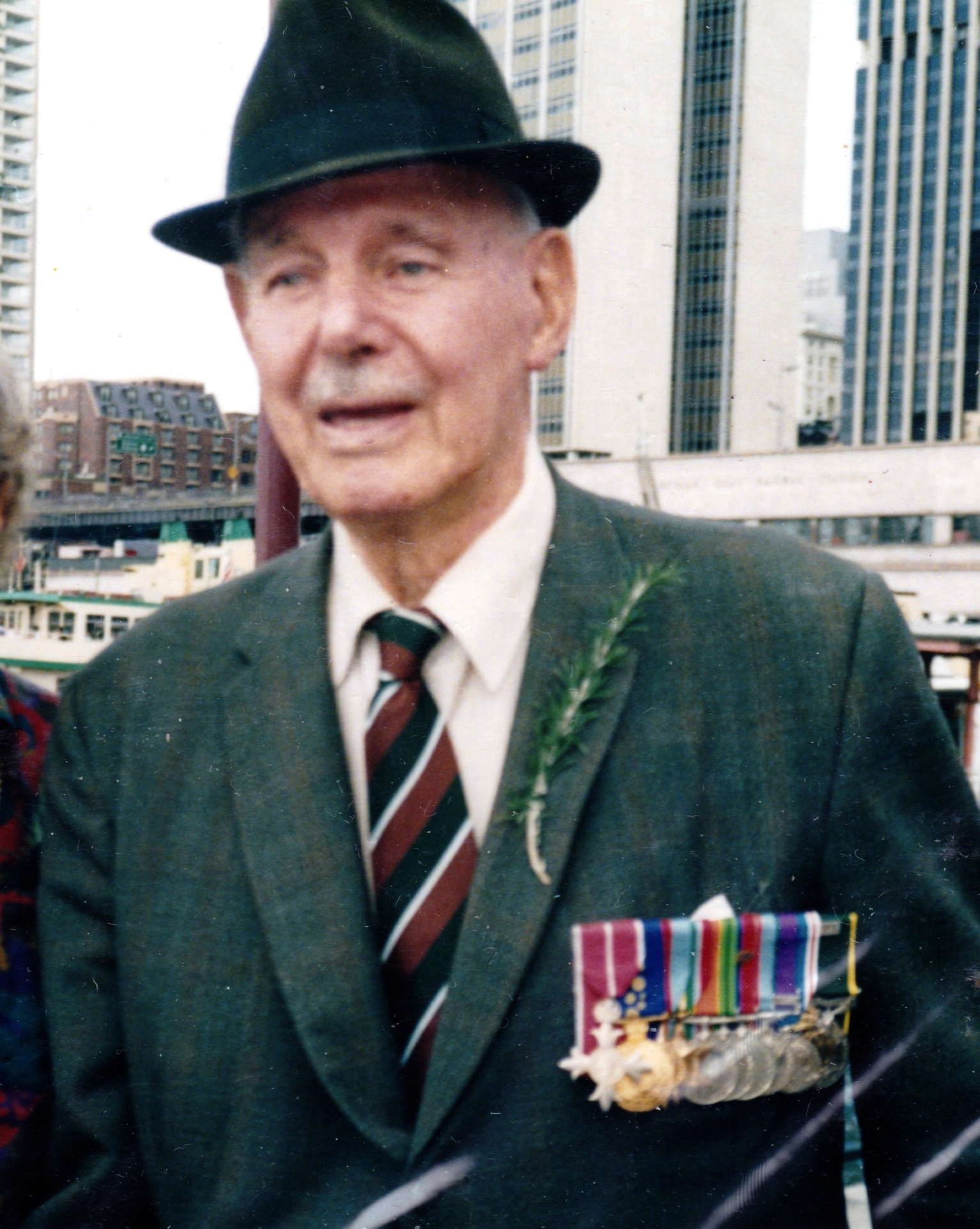
- Newton attending the 1991 Anzac Day march in Sydney.
- Born: 22 December 1906; Balmain, New South Wales
- Died: 31 July 1994 (aged 87); Sydney, New South Wales
- Spouse(s): Valeda Doreen Maxwell; Florence Alice Whiteside
- Military career
- Allegiance: Australia
- Branch: Australian Army
- Rank: Lieutenant Colonel
- Nickname: Roaring Reggie
- Service number: NX34734
- Unit: 2/19th Battalion
- Commands: U Battalion; Newton Force
- Conflicts: Second World War; Battle of Muar; Battle of Singapore
- Awards: Member of the Order of the British Empire; Medal of the Order of Australia; Efficiency Decoration

Lieutenant Colonel Reginald William James Newton, MBE, OAM, ED (22 December 1906 – 31 July 1994) was an Australian Army officer noted for his leadership while in Japanese prisoner of war camps during the Second World War. He became well known among Australian military circles, where he was affectionately known as "Roaring Reggie."

== Early life ==
Reginald Newton was born in the Sydney suburb of Balmain on 22 December 1906 to Thomas and Mary Newton (née Hagan). He joined the Australian military at 15 years of age as a camp cadet at Coonabarabran. At the outbreak of the Second World War he was a militia captain in the 5th Infantry Brigade at Parramatta.

== Battle of Singapore ==
On 2 February 1941 Newton left for Singapore as headquarters company commander in the 2/19th Battalion, part of the 22nd Brigade, 8th Division.

After arriving in Singapore, Captain Newton's battalion was sent north to Seremban in southern Malaya for training in tropical conditions. Eleven months later they engaged the invading Japanese when they were rushed forward to support the beleaguered 2/29th Battalion at Baku. Australian anti-tank gunners destroyed nine Japanese tanks in the Baku area. The 2/19th held a vital crossroad allowing the 2/29th and the 45th Indian Infantry Brigade to withdraw to Muar. Their action resulted in them being outflanked by superior numbers and they had to fight their way through a succession of Japanese roadblocks. The Australians' six-day clash with the crack 5th Imperial Guards Division was one of the epic encounters of the Malaya campaign. British commander Lieutenant General Arthur Percival, considered the delay they imposed had saved a large part of his army from being cut-off and annihilated at Yong Peng. With ammunition exhausted, casualties mounting and no chance of relief the 2/19th struck out through the jungle leaving wounded behind. It was later learned all the wounded were murdered by Lieutenant General Takuma Nishimura's Guards in what became known as the Parit Sulong Massacre. Nishimura was hanged in 1951 for war crimes. 2/19th commanding officer, Lieutenant Colonel Charles Anderson was awarded the Victoria Cross for his courage and leadership.

The Battle of Singapore came to an end on February 15 when Lieutenant General Percival surrendered British, Australian and Indian forces to General Tomoyuki Yamashita. Newton and his group of wounded men were still in the battle area. Their plan to escape was thwarted when they were betrayed by locals. They were eventually captured and taken to Kuala Lumpur's Pudu Jail, where Newton faced 60 hours of interrogation. He found that despite only being a captain, he was the highest ranking Australian officer at Pudu. He quickly decided that the best way to protect his men was to adopt practices not normally part of military routines. Trading with civilians and smuggling in extra food from the outside built trust among the prisoners of war. When he was moved from Pudu to Changi Prison his commanding officer was Lieutenant Colonel Frederick Galleghan, who did not approve of Newton's style or the way he had acted at Pudu. Despite a number of clashes between them it came as a surprise in March 1943 when Galleghan appointed Captain Newton to head U Battalion, D Force. This comprised 695 men mainly drawn from the 22nd Brigade. They left Changi and their destination turned out to be the Thai-Burma Railway in Kanchanaburi, Thailand. Newton's appointment meant he had jumped over many more senior officers. There was speculation that it could have been Galleghan's way of getting him out of Changi.

== Reputation ==
The name "Roaring Reggie" came from the way he would shout at the Japanese guards. This subjected him to many beatings. Standing up for his men was Newton's main focus. He would do whatever was necessary to protect them and keep them alive. He found that feigning displays of respect for Warrant Officer Aitaro "Tiger" Hiramatusu, the Japanese camp commander, brought more benefits than acts of defiance. In an interview with Pattie Wright for her book The Men of the Line, Len, a 2/19th member recalled how Newton got on the "Tiger's" better side. "The 'Tiger' was a bad one but Reggie got around him. We saw comfort women come into our camp. They were in the last carriage of one of the trains going through. In fact "The Tiger" asked Reggie if he wanted women to come into the camp. I wasn't around for this exchange, but I heard Reggie said he'd prefer a few more bags of rice instead of women."

"A lot of times we thought he was going to get his head cut off," one Australian said. "Everyone who was there would say that they got home because of Reg." Another said: "We were lucky to have Reg Newton and that is evidenced by the fact that the casualties in D Force were one of the lowest and it was definitely because of him." His men realised his unorthodox measures gave them the best chance of survival.

Of the 695 men in U Battalion, 33 died, all but one from illness.

"He would chip Japanese guards if their uniforms were not up to standard and they were terrified of him," a 2/19th member recalled. "If he went into a POW hut at one end they shot out at the other with cries of 'Argh, ichiban (number one) Australian!"

Newton carried a mini radio concealed in a water bottle from 1942 to August 1945. He managed to smuggle it in by teaming up with another POW, Charles Edwards, who swapped bags with him, Newton planned a decoy and they swapped back. It was powered by batteries Newton purchased from Boonpong Sirivejjabhandu, a Thai canteen owner whose underground activities supported the POWs. Boonpong also provided medical supplies and was paid by Newton's personal promissory notes that were made good by the Australian Government at war's end.

== Newton Force ==
On 1 July 1944 Newton commanded the "Newton Force" of 2,250 Australian, British, Dutch and American POWs who were moved from Thailand to the Ohama camp in Japan. Most of the ships carrying the POWs were sunk by American submarines. The Americans were not aware the ships were carrying Allied POWs. On 4 July 1944 Newton left Singapore on board the Rashin Maru. The vessel was in such poor condition the Australian POWs nicknamed it the Byoki Maru meaning "sick ship." On board were 600 Australians, 300 Dutch and 165 British. The trip took 70 days. They avoided being torpedoed and dodging typhoons, arriving in Nagasaki on 8 September. Almost 12 months later it was torpedoed and sunk by the USS Pargo.

After the war Newton went to Wilmington, North Carolina, and met with the retired submarine commander who had the Byoki Maru in his sights. He asked why they did not fire. "The ship you were on wasn't worth wasting a torpedo on," was the reply.

In Japan Newton insisted that the Australian POWs got a proportionate number of good jobs, such as cooks.

In August 1945 Newton's time as a captive of the Japanese came to an end. Signals from Allied Headquarters were dropped by aircraft into the camp ordering Newton to get his men out by train to Wakanoura, near Osaka, about 200 miles away. Gilbert Mant, writing in the Sydney Sun Herald said "'Roaring Reggie' roared up to the stationmaster, the chief of police and other high-ranking Japanese officials at Onada and demanded a train with eight carriages." The Japanese wilted under the verbal barrage from the Australian officer but the stationmaster was adamant that no train would be permitted to leave unless Newton had signed a proper voucher for it. He signed with a flourish, then forgot all about it. Four months later he received an invoice at his Sydney home from the Japanese Railways for an amount totalling 7,250 yen. It called for 6,035 yen for 355 fares and 1,215 yen for the sleeping car that had been used for stretcher cases. Unlike Boonpong, the Thai canteen owner, the Japanese Railways were never recompensed.

In 1945 the 2/19th Battalion was disbanded. Its casualty list was the highest of any Australian Army unit in the Second World War. At war crimes trials Newton testified that 68 men were beaten to death in digging Hellfire Pass.

In August 1946 "The Tiger" faced justice. Warrant Officer Aitaro Hiramatsu along with another camp commander, Lieutenant Kishio Usuki, were charged with ill-treatment of POWs, including beatings, depriving them of food and medicine and forcing the sick to work. The war crimes trial in Singapore found them both guilty and they were sentenced to death by hanging.

== Honours ==
Newton's elevation to lieutenant colonel also came through at war's end.

In 1947 Newton was appointed a Member of the Order of the British Empire. The award citation read: "ARMY-Distinguished Service in the SW Pacific. He was brutally ill treated by Japanese guards while endeavoring to ameliorate the bad conditions for those under his command. His efforts on many occasions were directly responsible for saving many lives and casualties." He was also awarded the Efficiency Decoration (ED) marking his twenty plus years of service "as a part-time efficient and thoroughly capable commissioned officer" in the Citizen Military Forces.

== Post-war ==
After the war Newton devoted himself to the welfare of ex-POWs and in 1978 he was awarded the Medal of the Order of Australia "for his work and service to the welfare of ex-servicemen."

In 1976 the 837-page history of Newton's unit was published. It was titled "The Grim Glory of the 2/19th Battalion AIF," and Newton edited submissions from many of his fellow POWs.

Newton died at the War Veterans' Home in Narrabeen, a Sydney suburb, on 31 July 1994. On 6 August, the Sydney Morning Herald described him as "the Protector of Death Railway POWs." It said: "Reg Newton emerged as an outstanding leader in World War Two Japanese POW camps on the infamous Thai-Burma Railway. As a camp commander he was often brutally beaten and ill-treated by guards while protesting against conditions imposed on his men. His efforts were recognised as having saved many lives."

Tom Uren, a former Australian Labor Party cabinet minister and fellow POW said: "He was simply one of the greats of the camps, a marvelous leader." Charles Edwards, a 2/19th survivor, summed up his Battalion's view of Roaring Reggie: "He was the greatest officer that ever pulled boots on."

== Personal life ==
Newton married twice – first to Valeda Doreen Maxwell and then to Florence Alice Whiteside.
