= Farewell, Nikola =

Novel by Australian writer Guy Boothby

- Author: Guy Boothby
- Language: English
- Series: Dr. Nikola
- Genre: Fiction
- Publisher: Ward, Lock and Bowden
- Publication date: 1901
- Publication place: U.K.
- Media type: Print
- Pages: 340 pp
- Preceded by: Dr Nikola's Experiment
- Followed by: -

Farewell, Nikola is a novel by Australian writer Guy Boothby. It was his fifth and final novel to feature his recurring character Dr. Nikola. It was published in book form in the United Kingdom by Ward, Lock and Bowden in 1901. The book is also known by the title Nikola's Farewell, the title under which it was serialised in several Australian newspapers in 1901, including The Brisbane Courier, The Daily Telegraph and The Chronicle from Adelaide.

== Abstract ==
Richard "Dick" Hatteras (the protagonist of the first Nikola novel A Bid for Fortune) is now knighted and married and staying in Venice with his wife. There he again meets Dr. Nikola, who lives in an old palace, carrying out his research. Hatteras is accompanied by his wife's companion Miss Gertrude Trevor, and her suitor Lord Glenbarth. Nikola gradually reveals details of his life including his obsession with seeking vengenace on a man who betrayed his mother.

== Publishing history ==
Following the book's initial newspaper serialisation, and then publication by Ward, Lock and Bowden in 1901 it was subsequently published as follows:

- Lippincott, 1901, USA
- Langton and Hall, 1901, Canada

The novel was translated into Swedish (1902) and Danish (1916).

== Critical reception ==
In The Brisbane Courier a writer noted: "There is no need to recommend the novel to readers. Mr Boothby has, perhaps, the widest reputation of any of the present-day novelists of adventure, and his name as the author of any book is sufficient criterion of the presence in its pages of enough 'thrills' to satisfy the most exacting of those who put quick movement and a string of hairbreadth escapes before anything else in their appreciation of a work of fiction."

The writer in Adelaide Observer observed: "Farewell, Nikola will be welcomed by readers who revel in a sensational tale, skilfully constructed, and captivating the imagination. Mr. Guy Boothby may without hesitation be classed among the most prolific storytellers of the day."

== Notes ==
The full text of the novel is available via Project Gutenberg.

== See also ==
- 1901 in Australian literature
