= A Bid for Fortune; Or, Doctor Nikola's Vendetta =

Novel by Australian writer Guy Boothby

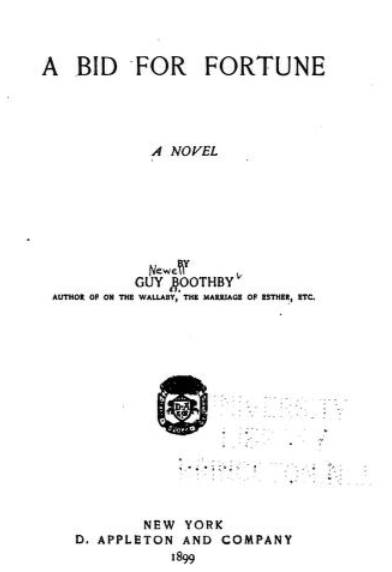
- Title page for A Bid for Fortune (1899)
- Author: Guy Boothby
- Language: English
- Series: Dr. Nikola
- Genre: Fiction
- Publisher: Ward, Lock and Bowden
- Publication date: 1895
- Publication place: U.K.
- Media type: Print
- Pages: 344 pp
- Followed by: Doctor Nikola
- Text: A Bid for Fortune; Or, Doctor Nikola's Vendetta at Wikisource

A Bid for Fortune; Or, Doctor Nikola's Vendetta (1895) is a novel by Australian writer Guy Boothby. It was his first novel to feature his recurring character Dr. Nikola. It was originally serialised in The Windsor Magazine : An Illustrated Monthly for Men and Women over 22 issues in 1895, and was then published in the United Kingdom by Ward, Lock and Bowden in the same year.

== Abstract ==
"In this first novel, the protagonist is a young Australian, Richard Hatteras, who has made a small fortune in pearl-diving operations in the Thursday Islands. With money in his pocket, he decides to travel. Visiting Sydney before taking ship for England, he meets and falls in love with the daughter of the Colonial Secretary, Sylvester Wetherell. As the story moves on, it is revealed that Wetherell has fallen foul of the evil Dr. Nikola, who has developed a devious scheme to force Wetherell to submit to his demands to give him a mysterious oriental object he has acquired. The life and liberty of Hatteras’ lady-love are imperilled as Nikola's plot moves on, and Hatteras has to make strenuous efforts to locate and free her."

== Publishing history ==
Following the book's initial magazine serialisation, and then publication by Ward, Lock and Bowden in 1895 it was subsequently published as follows:

- Appleton, 1895, USA; reprinted 1897
- Ward, Lock & Co., 1902, UK; reprinted 1906, 1918, 1919, and 1929

And subsequent paperback and ebook editions.

The novel was translated into Finnish (1904), Swedish (1907) and Danish (1916).

== Critical reception ==
Everett F. Bleiler in Science-Fiction: The Early Years notes that the book is included in his volume even though it "is not science-fiction, but is included since it gives background." He goes on to describe the novel: "Vulgar, carelessly plotted, unconvincing, it is at times almost a parody of the late Victorian adventure story."

== Film adaptation ==
In 1917 a silent film adaptation, titled A Bid for Fortune, was released. It was directed by Sidney Morgan from a script by Guy Boothby. A Bid for Fortune; Or, Doctor Nikola's Vendetta at IMDb

== See also ==
- 1895 in Australian literature
