= The Australian Girl, and Other Verses =

Poetry collection by Ethel Castilla

The Australian Girl : And Other Verses
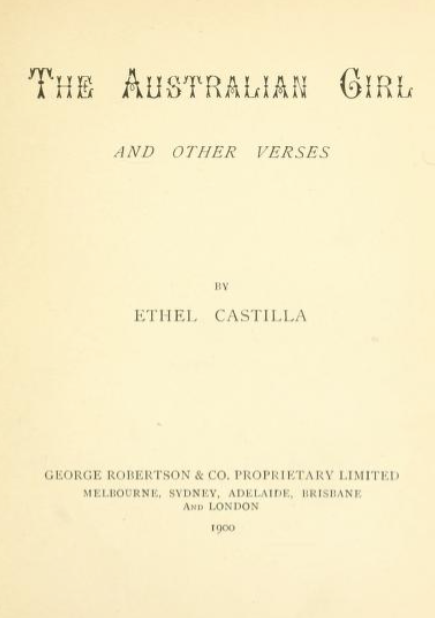
- Title page for The Australian Girl, and Other Verses (1900)
- Author: Ethel Castilla
- Language: English
- Publisher: George Robertson
- Publication date: 1900
- Publication place: Australia
- Media type: Print (hardback)
- Pages: 92

The Australian Girl, And Other Verses (1900) was the only collection of poems by Australian poet Ethel Castilla. It was released in hardback by George Robertson publishers in 1900. It features the author's most famous work, "The Australian Girl".

The original collection includes 26 poems by the author that are reprinted from various sources. It also includes a preface by Rolf Boldrewood.

== See also ==
- 1900 in poetry
- 1900 in Australian literature

== Notes ==
- Dedication

To my uncle Major General Robert Stanwix Robertson as a slight token of affection and of gratitude for literary sympathy.

- Author's note

Some of the Verses appear for the first time in print. Others have been published in various Australian periodicals.

== Contents ==
- "The Australian Girl"
- "The Australian Woman"
- "An Australian Lullaby"
- "A Summer Sunset"
- "The Bush"
- "The Austral Seasons"
- "In Carnival Time"
- "A Song of Sydnery"
- "A Ballad of Brisbane"
- "To an Australian Boy"
- "A Birthday Greeting"
- "A Birthday Song"
- "A City Bird"
- "A Rosebud"
- "To Algernon Swinburne"
- "Charity"
- "Kareen"
- "Yandilla"
- "To the South Wind"
- "Christmas Lillies"
- "Christmas Day
- "Easter Tide"
- "The Song of the Salvation Army"
- "The Question"
- "Judith (On Hearing Dr. Parry's Oratorio)"
- "In the Face of the Dead"

== Critical reception ==
A reviewer in Table Talk was rather sparing in their praise but did go on to note: "Miss Castilla appears to have a great affection for things Australian and the Australian girl according to her is a sort of admirabie Crichton in petticoats. Miss Castilla is not a great poet, but she has produced some pretty little verses which with more attention to rhyme and metre she could improve upon."

A reviewer in The Australian Star began with praise but noted some deficiencies in the poetry: "Ethel Castllla is here introduced as an Australian singer, and under a no less worthy sponsor than Rolf Boldrewood. The sponsor says all that can be said in commendation of the maiden effort, and there will be no disposition amongst kindly critics to differ with him. Miss Ethel Castllla does treat in a refined way with familiar subjects. She may also, when touching such subjects, show a reverent, tender knowledge of childhood's grace, and an affectionate sympathy therewith. Also, there is evidence of the habit of careful observation, and—of its neglect."
