= Benjamin Boothby =

Australian judge (1803–1868)

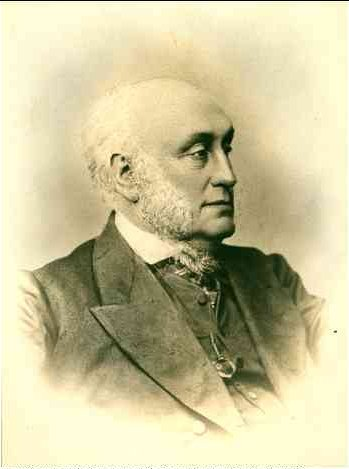
Judge Benjamin Boothby, 1860

Benjamin Boothby (5 February 1803 – 21 June 1868) was a judge in the colony of South Australia. He was removed from office for misbehaviour, one of four Australian supreme court judges removed in the 19th century. He was the father of electoral reformer William Boothby.

== Early life ==
Benjamin Boothby was born in Doncaster, Yorkshire, England, on 5 February 1803.

== Career ==
=== England ===
Boothby assisted Sir Thomas Wilde in his electoral campaigns and read in his chambers. He was called to the Bar at Gray's Inn in 1825.

=== South Australia ===
In 1853, Boothby was appointed a Judge of the Supreme Court of South Australia. This was the last appointment of a South Australian judge by the Colonial Office.

Boothby, in a series of judgments, adopted a pedantic approach to Imperial Law, holding a number of South Australian statutes invalid, including those which introduced the Torrens system of land registration in the colony.

Boothby also asserted that the Parliament of South Australia had not been validly constituted since the enactment of the Constitution Act 1855–56.

In 1865, partly in response to the approach taken by Boothby, the (British) Imperial Parliament passed the Colonial Laws Validity Act 1865, confirming the authority of the colonial parliament to pass legislation different from that passed by the Imperial Parliament. However, Boothby continued to create difficulties, refusing to acknowledge the authority of the Attorney-General and challenging the legality of the appointments of the other two judges of the Supreme Court on the supposed basis that only British-trained (in England, or Ireland; rather than in Australia) barristers could be appointed.

Proceedings were commenced to remove Boothby from office on the ground of misbehaviour. The charges were found proved and the judge was "amoved" on 29 July 1867. Boothby took formal steps to appeal this decision to the Privy Council, but died before the appeal was heard.

== Family ==
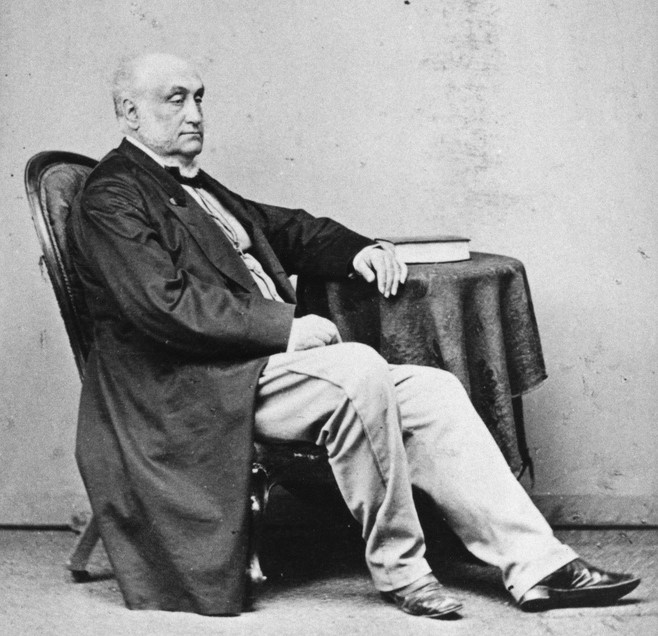
Judge Benjamin Boothby, c. 1860

Justice Benjamin Boothby (5 February 1803 – 21 June 1868) married Maria Bradbury Robinson (c. 1807 – 18 June 1889) in May 1827, lived at "The Glen", Glen Osmond, later a Passionist monastery. Their fifteen children included:

- Anna Robinson Boothby (c. 1828 – 13 November 1903) married Basil Robertson Lethem (c. 1822 – 17 March 1885), lived in Brisbane.
- William Robinson Boothby CMG (26 September 1829 – 12 July 1903), Electoral Commissioner from 1856 to 1903. He married Frances Elizabeth Lawrence ( – 29 August 1922) on 23 June 1863; their children were:

- Laurie Boothby (1 April 1864 – 4 March 1891) died at "Peynell", Mount Lofty.
- Frances Leila Boothby (19 December 1867 – 12 July 1935) married cousin Hugo Boothby on 15 June 1899, lived at 155 Strangways Terrace, North Adelaide.
- Brinsley Charles Boothby (18 September 1865 – 1941) solicitor in partnership with brother F. Brooke Boothby, lived on Malvern Road, Toorak, married Edith Blanche Jerrard on 12 December 1899.
- Ellen Constance "Connie" Boothby (11 April 1870 – ) married George K. B. Norman ( – ) of Manningtree, Essex on 14 April 1909
- F(rederick) Brooke Boothby (11 February 1878 – 1941) married May Begg ( – ) of Beaconsfied WA on 8 July 1903. He was solicitor in partnership with Brinsley Charles Boothby as Boothby and Boothby, 408 Collins Street, Melbourne.

- Benjamin Boothby CE (18 February 1831 – 13 August 1883), a civil engineer, married Mary Ann Warland (c. 1841 – 15 May 1925) on 1 December 1859; they had six sons and at least one daughter:

- Osbert Boothby (15 September 1860 – ) married Margaret Agnes Walter of Brisbane on 16 January 1894.
- Hugo Boothby (1863 – 24 July 1954) married cousin Frances Leila Boothby on 15 June 1899. He was an officer with the Supreme Court.
- Theodric "Theo" Boothby (1864 – 17 June 1932) married Elizabeth "Bessie" Uppington ( – ) on 18 April 1911, lived in England
- Leofric Boothby (1869–1937) married Mary Amelia Phillips in 1902
- Ralph Boothby (c. 1871 – 16 July 1945) married Annie Florence Nottage (c. 1871 – 28 May 1950) on 23 September 1896
- Gilbert Boothby ( – c. December 1946) was Shire Clerk, Toowoomba, Queensland
- Mary Elizabeth Boothby (3 December 1883 – ) married Wilfred Ernest Ashenden ( – ) on 23 March 1926

- J(oseph) Gilbert Boothby (c. 1832 – 23 September 1892) businessman with Turnbull, Boothby & Little, agent for Norwich Union Fire Insurance Society and consular agent for Italy.
- George Boothby (c. 1835 – 1 July 1893) died at "The Glen", Glen Osmond. He was Adelaide manager of the Commercial Union Assurance Company and auditor and life member of the Zoological Society.
- Josiah Boothby CMG (8 April 1837 – 12 June 1916) married Susannah Hinds Lawrence (4 July 1838 – 17 November 1921) on 10 October 1861; they had one son and four daughters.

- Ethel Susie Boothby (30 June 1862 – )
- Reginald Klingender Boothby (20 September 1864 – 16 October 1904), customs agent, married Bessie Thomson on 1 December 1887, lived 48 Barnard street, North Adelaide.
- Mabel Frances Boothby (5 July 1866 – 14 October 1944), co-founder and longtime secretary of the SA chapter of Alliance Française, was a noted painter and author of "Autobiography of a Kookaburra".
- (Edith) Minnie Boothby (5 November 1869 – 30 October 1948) lived at 158 Barnard Street, North Adelaide
- Alice Nina Boothby (14 July 1871 – 4 December 1944)

- Elizabeth L. Boothby (c. 1838 – September 1908) inherited "The Glen" and sold it to the Passionist Fathers January 1896, renamed St. Paul's Retreat.
- Thomas Wilde Boothby (9 December 1839 – 19 June 1885), pastoralist and parliamentarian, married Mary Agnes Hodding (1843 – 16 July 1907) on 10 March 1864. Their children included:

- Guy Newell Boothby (13 October 1867 – 26 February 1907) private secretary to mayor, successful author in England. He also he wrote libretti for two comic operas Sylvia (1890, Adelaide) and The Jonquil (1891).
- Benjamin "Ben" Boothby (28 January 1870 – ), companion on Guy's journeys, was also a writer of popular fiction and completed several of his brother's unfinished stories. and illustrated others. He was in business as land agent of Bloomsbury, London.
- youngest son Robert Cecil Boothby (7 July 1872 – ) married Constance Ellen Miall ( – ) on 2 June 1906. He was stockbroker of Sydenham, Kent. Mother and two sons left Australia in January 1874

- James Henry Boothby (c. 1841 – 7 December 1920) married (Harriet) Emma Wilson (c. 1856 – 8 December 1885), daughter of Rev. Yelverton Wilson, on 10 December 1874, settled at "Nalang", Tatiara, South Australia, retired to "Nalang", Malvern, Victoria. He was stock inspector with Dalgety & Co., and wrote a series of historical articles for The Register.

- Elsie May (17 February 1878 – 5 September 1891)
- J(ames) Noel Boothby ( – June 1919) married Marion "May" Parker ( – 1 August 1929) on 14 October 1914, lived at "Currajong", St. Kilda, Victoria.

- Maria Robinson Boothby (c. 1843 – 25 July 1903) married Alfred William Howitt DSc of Omeo, Victoria on 18 August 1864, lived in Sale, Victoria. Howitt was author of The Native Tribes of South-East Australia.
- Charles John Boothby (c. 1844 – 10 November 1854)
- Jemima Robinson Boothby (c. 1845 – 5 January 1918) married Rev. Richard George Burke (c. 1845 – 24 May 1923) on 7 August 1879
- Alfred Frederick Boothby (c. 1850 – 22 February 1876) died at "The Glen", Glen Osmond
