= The Childerbridge Mystery =

Novel by Australian writer Guy Boothby

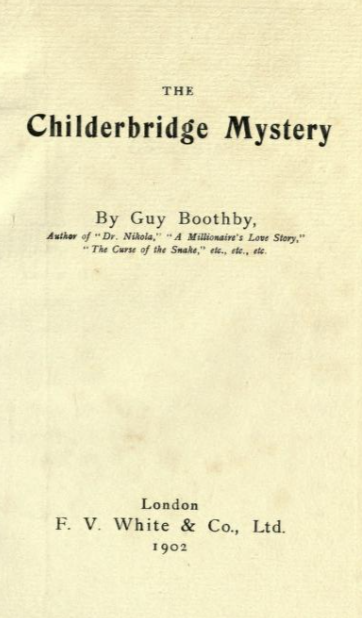
- Title page for The Childerbridge Mystery (1902)
- Author: Guy Boothby
- Language: English
- Genre: Fiction
- Publisher: F. V. White
- Publication date: 1902
- Publication place: Australia
- Media type: Print
- Pages: 304pp.
- Preceded by: My Strangest Case
- Followed by: The Curse of the Snake

The Childerbridge Mystery (1902) is a novel by Australian writer Guy Boothby.

The novel was originally serialised in The Daily Telegraph (Sydney) in 21 instalments in January 1902, before its initial book publication in England. It was also serialised in several other Australian newspapers in the first half of 1902.

== Synopsis ==
William Standerton has made his fortune as a squatter in Australia and has now returned to England, where he has purchased Childerbridge Manor. Standerton is being blackmailed by a man who has followed him to England from Australia. The day after a meeting with his blackmailer Standerton is found dead from strangulation, and his son, James, sets out to find the killer.

== Critical reception ==
A reviewer in The Register from Adelaide noted that "...a story to read and finish during a leisure day, but with none of the allurements of the standard novel to which one can return with pleasure in the after time...His books are readable, but not always sustaining. Still they are clever and popular.."

A writer in The Sunday Times (Sydney) was more scathing: "The story could have been told with ease in two newspaper columns, and as a literary effort is quite unworthy of the author, whose forte would seem to lie in tales of pure adventure amidst strange lands and people."

== Publication history ==
After its original book publication in 1902 in England by publishers F. V. White the novel was later published as follows:

- George Bell & Sons, UK, 1902

The novel was also translated into Swedish (1904).

== See also ==
- 1902 in Australian literature
