= A Bid for Fortune =

1917 British crime film by Sidney Morgan

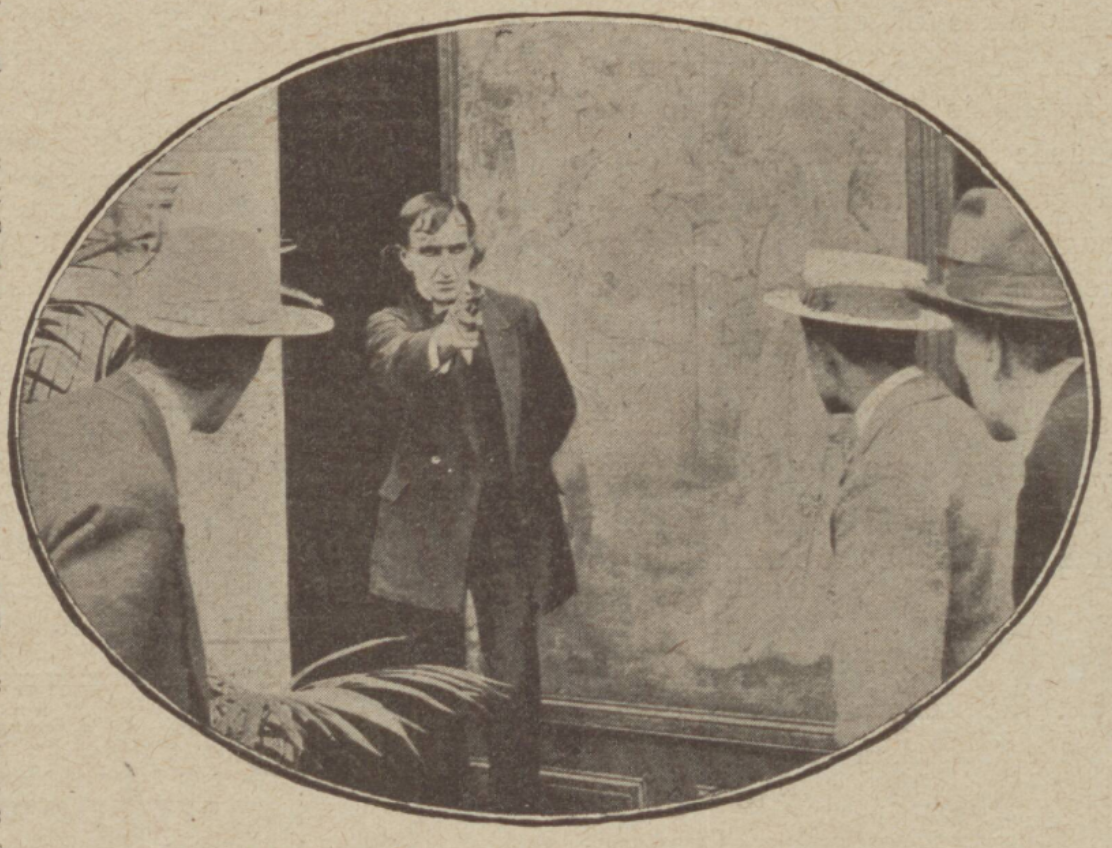
- A. Harding Steerman in a publicity still
- Directed by: Sidney Morgan
- Written by: Guy Boothby (novel)
- Based on: A Bid for Fortune; Or, Doctor Nikola's Vendetta by Guy Boothby
- Starring: A. Harding Steerman; Violet Graham; Sydney Vautier
- Production company: Unity-Super Films
- Distributed by: Unity-Super Films
- Release date: April 1917
- Country: United Kingdom
- Languages: Silent; English intertitles

A Bid for Fortune is a 1917 British silent crime film directed by Sidney Morgan and starring A. Harding Steerman, Violet Graham and Sydney Vautier. It is based on Guy Boothby's novel of the same name

== Cast ==
- A. Harding Steerman as Dr Nikola
- Violet Graham as Phyllis Wetherall
- Sydney Vautier as Dick Hattaras

== Bibliography ==
- Goble, Alan. The Complete Index to Literary Sources in Film. Walter de Gruyter, 1999.
- Low, Rachael. The History of the British Film 1914 - 1918. George Allen & Unwin, 1950.
