= An Outback Marriage =

1900 novel by A. B. Paterson

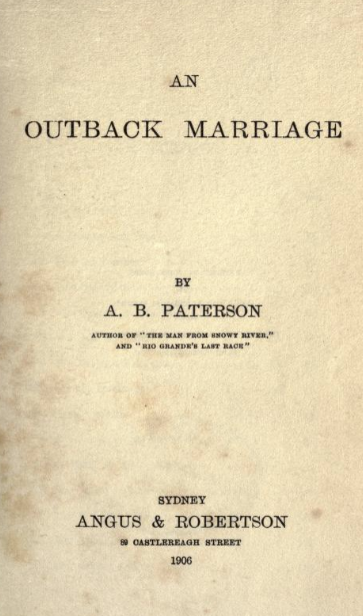
- Title page for An Outback Marriage (1906)
- Author: A. B. Paterson
- Original title: In No Man's Land
- Language: English
- Genre: Fiction
- Publisher: Angus & Robertson
- Publication date: 1906
- Publication place: Australia
- Media type: Print
- Pages: 277 pp
- Followed by: The Shearer's Colt

An Outback Marriage (1900) is a novel by Australian writer A. B. Paterson. It was originally published in The Leader newspaper in Melbourne in 16 weekly instalments, between 13 January and 12 May 1900, under the title In No Man's Land.

== Plot outline ==
"An Outback Marriage tells of a young Englishman on a tour of the colonies, who gets more than he bargained for when he sets out to find the heir to a fortune. This is the story not of one marriage but several, bringing the whole of colonial society - from the sqauttoracy to cattle rustlers - to vivid, unforgettable life." (Publisher's blurb, 2009 Viking edition)

== Critical reception ==
- A reviewer in The Daily Telegraph from Sydney noted, on the book's 1906 publication, that: "In addition to stirring and racy descriptive writing that rings true and is at the same time pleasantly flavored with sub-acid Patersonian humor, the reader can enjoy a good honest plot with plenty of substance in it. Mr. Paterson, in fact, has a real story to tell, and he tells it very effectively and coherently on the whole, yet not without certain divagations and excursions, which, although unnecessary to the narrative, may be pardoned for their intrinsic brightness and veracity."
- The reviewer in The Age called it a "rattling yarn" before going on to say: "It makes no pretensions to be anything more than a story of everyday Australians, but the graphic details of station and droving life, the raciness of the dialogue, and humor generally, and the excellence of the local color displayed in its pages, will give a reader a couple of hours of genuinely refreshing entertainment."

== Note ==
- The Leader newspaper from Orange, noted in 1906 that: "This was printed serially five years ago under the title, "In No Man's Land." Since then it has undergone such complete revision that it may be considered almost a new story."

== See also ==
- 1900 in Australian literature
