= The Earthen Floor =

1902 collection of poems by E. J. Brady

- Author: E. J. Brady
- Language: English
- Genre: Poetry collection
- Publisher: Grip Newspaper Co., Grafton
- Publication date: 1902
- Publication place: Australia
- Media type: Print
- Pages: 68 pp
- Preceded by: The Ways of Many Waters
- Followed by: Bushland Ballads

The Earthen Floor (1902) was a collection of poems by Australian poet E. J. Brady. It was released in hardback by Grip Newspaper Co., Grafton, in a print run of 1000 copies but has not been reprinted.

The collection includes 35 poems by the author that are reprinted from various sources, though they mainly originally appeared in The Bulletin between 1897 and 1902.

== Contents ==
- "To Norma"
- "The Earthen Floor"
- "Once Upon a Time"
- "In Thule"
- "Nocturne"
- "Shadows"
- "Wine Song"
- "Star and Spire"
- "Idols"
- "The Lily and the Rose"
- "Dross and Gold"
- "The Lesson"
- "The Quiet City"
- "Sic Transit"
- "Ego"
- "Three Ghosts"
- "Time"
- "To-Morrow Morn"
- "Dust and Shade"
- "Sic Itur Ad Astra"
- "Ice Virgins"
- "Otahai"
- "There's Something at the Yard-Arm"
- "The Witch Wife's Weaving"
- "The Dead Ships"
- "Twilight"
- "His Lights are Out"
- "The Seven Sisters"
- "The Lost Brigade"
- "The Black-Soil Teams"
- "Same as You"
- "Knights of Chance"
- "The Lonely Road"
- "The Hunter's Greeting"
- "Rebel Song"

== Critical reception ==
A reviewer in The Truth (Sydney) opined that "This little volume of tuneful verse should have a ready and very large sale. Mr. Brady's poetic genius is, while distinctly Australian, sufficiently international to voice the feelings and aspirations even of those who 'go down to the sea in ships;' and in the delineation of Love's tender or melancholy moods he is not easily surpassed"

In their review The Brisbane Courier was impressed, to a point: "Mr. Brady is a well-known verse writer – we had almost said poet – and The Ways of Many Waters has given him a right to inclusion in the ranks of our sweetest singers at all events. He is undoubtedly a singer; his verses flow melodiously, his taste is excellent, and there is thought if not inspiration in much that he has to tell."

== See also ==
- 1902 in Australian literature
- 1902 in poetry
