= William Boothby =

Australian civil servant (1829–1903)

William Boothby CMG
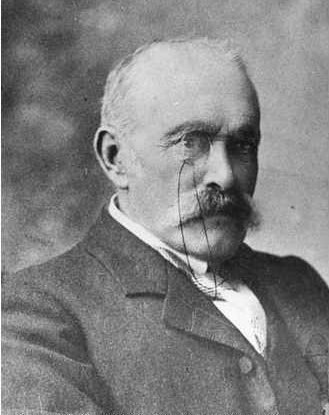

Deputy-Sheriff
- In office December 1853 – March 1856

Sheriff
- In office March 1856 – 1903

Provincial Returning Officer
- In office 1856–1901

Personal details
- Born: 28 September 1829 United Kingdom
- Died: 12 July 1903 (aged 73)
- Relations: Guy Boothby (nephew)
- Parent(s): Benjamin Boothby; Maria Bradbury Boothby

William Robinson Boothby CMG (26 September 1829 – 12 July 1903) was Provincial Returning Officer for the colony of South Australia in every parliamentary election from 1856 to 1901, and then State Returning Officer until 1903. Under his direction and advice, South Australia developed the world's first permanent electoral administration. In 1903 the Federal seat of Boothby was established and named in his honour.

== Early life ==
William Robinson Boothby was born at Nottingham, England, on 26 September 1829, the eldest son of Benjamin Boothby. William emigrated to the colony of South Australia with his parents during 1853, after his father had been appointed Justice of the South Australian Supreme Court.

== Public office ==
When Boothby arrived in Adelaide, many of its working men had departed the town due to the gold rush. As a result, he was able to quickly secure the position of deputy sheriff when Charles Newenham – the colony's sheriff – was on leave . When Newenham resigned in 1856, Boothby became sheriff, an office he held until his death in 1903.

In October 1856, a few months after Boothby was appointed sheriff, the province of South Australia achieved responsible government. Under the Electoral Act 1856, divisional returning officers were established for each lower-house electorate and a Provincial Returning Officer established for the single province-wide electoral district representing the upper-house. Boothby was appointed as the colony's first Provincial Returning Officer and was tasked with helping to administer its first parliamentary elections.

Boothby was the State Returning Officer for the first Australian House of Representatives election in 1901.

In his later years, he became Comptroller of Prison Labour and a senator of the University of Adelaide in South Australia.

== Electoral reforms ==
In his capacity as Provicinal Returning Officer, Boothby turned the office into powerful co-ordinating authority and a source of expert advice on electoral matters. Over time, the bureaucratic reforms he championed resulted in South Australia developing the world's first permanent electoral administration.

Following South Australia's first elections in 1856, Boothby provided a series of recommendations to government for improvements to electoral processes that were implemented into legislation in 1858. These included the regularisation of duties and payments for District Returning Officers and, most famously, the introduction of new ballot formatting that allowed votes to be recorded by marking "the cross within the square" rather than by crossing out listed names of candidates. This distinctive formatting, alongside the protections for secret voting already implemented in multiple Australian colonies, was subsequently adopted by electoral reformers in Britain and the United States who argued for implementation of the "Australian ballot".

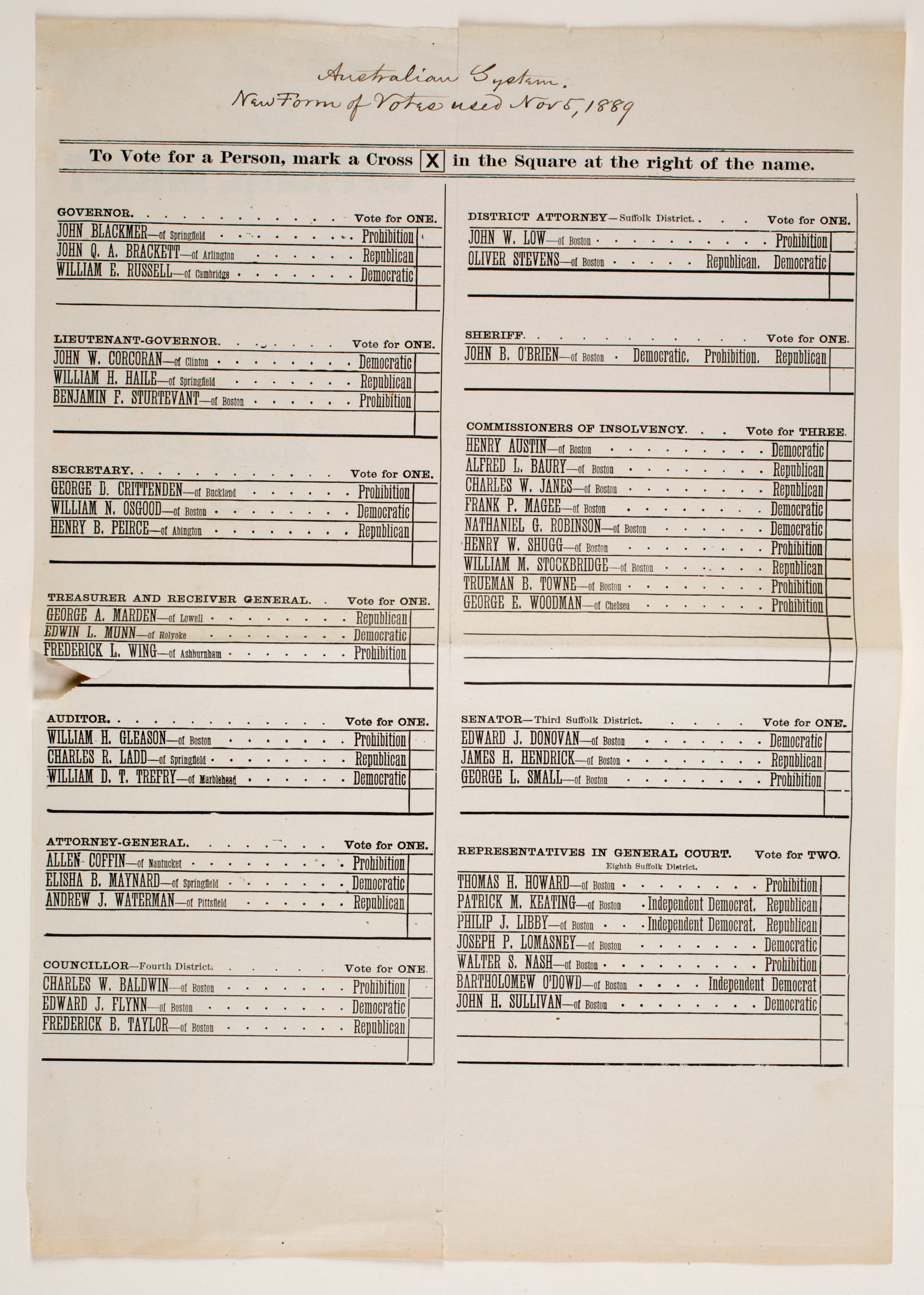
The Australian Secret Ballot used in the 1889 Massachusetts gubernatorial election.

Over the course of his career Boothby rationalised the management of electoral rolls by:

- Replacing annual with continuous enrolment, with returning officers employed on a permanent rather than periodic basis.
- Mandating communication of elector information between government agencies including as related to births, deaths, marriage, and change of address across electorates.
- Assuming government responsibility for compiling rolls of eligible voters, including by having council clerks and police officers distribute enrolment forms to every habitation once every five years.

In 1896, changes were implemented that gave the Provincial Returning Officer authority over the District Returning Officers as part of a formal chain of command. This was a precursor to the role of Chief Electoral Officer established by the first Commonwealth Electoral Act in 1902, and similar to the Election Master General which Jeremy Bentham had recommended in his Radical Reform Bill.

== Recognition and honours ==
Boothby was awarded a CMG in 1893.

In 1903 the Federal seat of Boothby was established and named in his honour.

== See also ==
- Guy Boothby, his nephew
