= Dr Nikola's Experiment =

Novel by Australian writer Guy Boothby

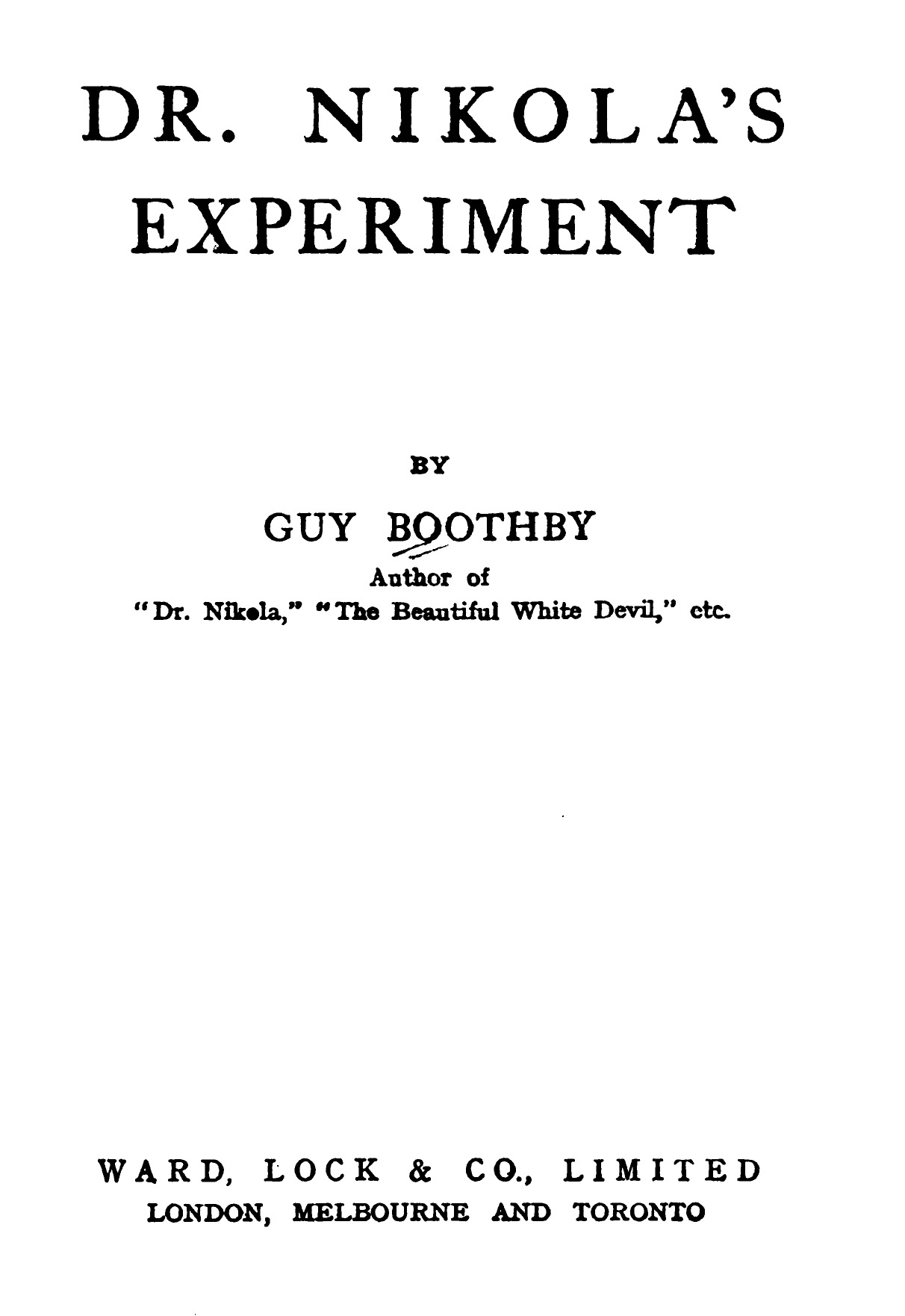
- Author: Guy Boothby
- Language: English
- Series: Dr. Nikola
- Genre: Fiction
- Publisher: Ward, Lock and Bowden
- Publication date: 1899
- Publication place: U.K.
- Media type: Print
- Pages: 340 pp
- Preceded by: The Lust of Hate
- Followed by: Farewell, Nikola

Dr Nikola's Experiment (1899) is a novel by Australian writer Guy Boothby. It was his fourth novel to feature his recurring character Dr. Nikola. It was first published serially in newspapers, then as a book by Ward, Lock and Bowden.

== Abstract ==
"Using Dr. Nikola for all he is worth, Guy Boothby brings us in this book to an experiment which is rather thrilling than original. With the stuff obtained at such fearful risk from the Thibetan monastery he proposes to do for an ancient Spanish Don all that the Devil did for Dr. Faustus. The old fellow is taken away to a Northumbrian castle, and mesmerised, and electrified, and physicked back to youth and energy again. But it is beyond the doctor, alas, to restore the mind, which has decayed, and his rejuvenated Don is a powerful and malignant idiot."

== Publishing history ==
Following the book's initial newspaper serialisation, and then publication by Ward, Lock and Bowden it was subsequently published as follows:

- Appleton, 1899, USA
- Hodder and Stoughton,1899, United Kingdom.
- Copp Clarke Company, 1899, Canada

The novel was translated into Swedish (1899).

== Critical reception ==
The Australian Star noted that this "is a book which will not disappoint readers who like their Boothby, nor diminish the author's brilliant if peculiar fame."

== See also ==
- 1899 in Australian literature
