= 1851 in Australian literature =

This article presents a list of the historical events and publications of Australian literature during 1851.

== Books ==
- Sarah Lee – Adventures in Australia, or, The Wanderings of Captain Spencer in the Bush and the Wilds : Containing Accurate Descriptions of the Habits of Natives, and the Natural Productions and Features of the Country
- Henry Melville – The Present State of Australia, Including New South Wales, Western Australia, South Australia, Victoria, and New Zealand, with Practical Hints on Emigration : To Which Are Added the Land Regulations, and Description of the Aborigines and Their Habits

== Short stories ==
- Samuel Sidney – "Christmas Day in the Bush"

== Poetry ==
- Charles Harpur
  - "A Mid-Summer Noon in the Australian Forest"
  - "The Voice of the Native Oak"
- G. W. Rusden – Moyarra

== Drama ==
- Francis Belfield – Zisca the Avenger

== Births ==
A list, ordered by date of birth (and, if the date is either unspecified or repeated, ordered alphabetically by surname) of births in 1851 of Australian literary figures, authors of written works or literature-related individuals follows, including year of death.

- 12 January – Philip Holdsworth poet (died 1902)
- 18 February – Arthur Patchett Martin (in Woolwich, Kent, England) writer and literary critic (died 1902)
- 26 March – Archibald Meston (in Towie, Aberdeenshire, Scotland) politician, civil servant, journalist, naturalist and explorer (died 1924)
- 27 March – Rosa Praed novelist (died 1935)
- 8 May – James Cuthbertson (in Glasgow, Scotland) poet (died 1910)
- 18 December – John Farrell (in Buenos Aires, Argentina) poet (died 1904)

== See also ==
- 1851 in poetry
- 1851 in literature
- List of years in literature
- List of years in Australian literature
