= Doctor Nikola (novel) =

Novel by Australian writer Guy Boothby

- Author: Guy Boothby
- Language: English
- Series: Dr. Nikola
- Genre: Fiction
- Publisher: Ward, Lock and Bowden
- Publication date: 1896
- Publication place: U.K.
- Media type: Print
- Pages: 322 pp
- Preceded by: A Bid for Fortune; Or, Doctor Nikola's Vendetta
- Followed by: The Lust of Hate

Doctor Nikola (1896) (a.k.a. Dr. Nikola) is a novel by Australian writer Guy Boothby. It was his second novel to feature his recurring character Dr. Nikola. It was originally serialised in The Windsor Magazine : An Illustrated Monthly for Men and Women over 8 issues in 1896, and in The Argus newspaper in Melbourne before it was then published in book form in the United Kingdom by Ward, Lock and Bowden in the same year.

== Abstract ==
"In Dr. Nikola the doctor and one Wilfred Bruce, a young Australian, go through a series of 'hair-raising' adventures in their endeavour to get to a certain Buddhist monastery in the heart of China. There exist in that monastery certain treasures which Dr. Nikola is very anxious to lay his hands upon, and possessed of which he can do more than any other man. Possibly they are secrets connected with hypnotism or magic of some sort; but the author prefers not to be too explicit on that point. It is sufficient to say that Nikola has undertaken to pay Wilfred Bruce £20,000 for his share in their discovery."

== Publishing history ==
Following the book's initial magazine serialisation, and then publication by Ward, Lock and Bowden in 1896 it was subsequently published as follows:

- Appleton, 1904, USA
- Ward, Lock & Co., reprinted 1898, 1918, UK

And subsequent paperback and ebook editions.

The novel was translated into Swedish (1908), Norwegian (1912), Danish (1915), French (1986), Spanish (2006), and Italian (2021).

== Critical reception ==
A reviewer in The Herald in Melbourne was quite taken with the novel: "One thing is certain, that the man who takes up Doctor Nikola to read as a 'time passer,' will not readily put it down again. There is, doubtless, in the general style of the author, especially in the descriptive portions of the narrative, a touch of Rider Haggard's peculiarities, but there is neither plagiarism nor copyism. One can feel, when one reads, what the writer means, and can almost accompany him in his sensations."

Similarly the reviewer in the Australian Town and Country Journal: "For adventure and marvel, such as are now so largely in demand, the tale is not easily to be surpassed, and is told with the simple directness of style that Mr. Boothby effectively employs to give an air of reality to his wildest imaginings."

== See also ==
- 1896 in Australian literature
