= The Woman of Death =

Novel by Guy Boothby

- Author: Guy Boothby
- Language: English
- Genre: Novel
- Publisher: George Bell & Sons, London
- Publication date: 1900
- Publication place: Australia
- Media type: Print
- Pages: 307pp
- Preceded by: A Prince of Swindlers
- Followed by: The Jonquil

The Woman of Death (1900) is a novel by Australian writer Guy Boothby.

== Story outline ==
The main character in the novel, Lord Middlesborough, is very wealthy, but is becoming bored with life. In Monte Carlo he meets Madame d'Espere who gives the impression that she is in possession of some sort of occult power. In Paris Middlesborough is introduced to a strange, secret club whose members participate, by lot, in duels to the death each fortnight. Middlesborough subsequently meets and marries Cecille de Tavernae, whose father is also a member of the club. The novel reaches a climax when Middlesborough is drawn to meet his father-in-law in a duel.

== Critical reception ==
A reviewer in The Capricornian detected a sameness about the work: "He has fertility of invention; he devises plots cleveriy, and works them out as realistically, as possible, but the characters and incidents are becoming familiar, and he does not throw in the descriptions which give a charm to The Beautiful White Devil and some other of his productions."

A note in The Newcastle Morning Herald and Miners' Advocate stated: "In this, his latest production, the author has abandoned his famous creation, Dr. Nikola, and introduces to us a female character as unreal and devilish as the former. The incidents are mainly laid in Paris, and are sensational enough to satisfy the most exacting lover of literature of that kind. The volume is a good illustration of Boothby's popular style, and will doubtless find many readers amongst those who read only to forget."

== Publication history ==
After the initial publication of the novel by George Bell & Sons in London in 1900, the novel was reprinted as follows:

- Arthur Pearson 1900, UK
- Arthur Pearson 1903, UK
- Arthur Pearson 1917, UK

== See also ==
- 1900 in Australian literature
