= 1852 in Australian literature =

This article presents a list of the historical events and publications of Australian literature during 1852.

== Events ==
- The George Robertson bookselling and publishing company was established in Melbourne.

== Books ==
- Thomas Hall – Floss : Or, The Progress of an Adventurer in the Regions of Australia

== Short stories ==
- Mary Theresa Vidal – "The Convict Laundress"

== Poetry ==
- Charles Harpur – "The Verse of Coleridge's 'Christabel'"

== Drama ==
- James McLachlin – Jackey Jackey the NSW Bushranger

== Non-fiction ==
- John Morgan – Life and Adventures of William Buckley
- John Dunmore Lang – The Australian Emigrant's Manual; Or, A Guide to the Gold Colonies of New South Wales and Port Phillip
- Louisa Anne Meredith – My Home in Tasmania, During a Residence of Nine Years

== Births ==
A list, ordered by date of birth (and, if the date is either unspecified or repeated, ordered alphabetically by surname) of births in 1852 of Australian literary figures, authors of written works or literature-related individuals follows, including year of death.

- 26 March – Alexander Sutherland (in Glasgow, Scotland), educator, writer and philosopher (died 1902)
- 3 June – Alfred Thomas Chandler, journalist, editor and newspaper proprietor (died 1941)
- 4 September – Edmund James Banfield (in Liverpool, England), writer and naturalist (died 1923)

== See also ==
- 1852 in poetry
- 1852 in literature
- List of years in literature
- List of years in Australian literature
