= Tom Gerrard =

1904 novel by Australian writer Louis Becke

- Author: Louis Becke
- Language: English
- Genre: Fiction
- Publisher: T. Fisher Unwin
- Publication date: 1904
- Publication place: Australia
- Media type: Print
- Pages: 292 pp.

Tom Gerrard (1904) is a novel by Australian writer Louis Becke. It was originally published in 1904 in England by publishers T. Fisher Unwin.

== Synopsis ==
Set in North Queensland in the 1860s, the novel follows the life and adventures of Tom Gerrard, a bachelor stockman, and his orphaned niece Mary.

== Critical reception ==
A reviewer in The Daily Telegraph called the novel "a thoroughly Australian story on the well-known lines. That, is to say, there is plenty of adventure, plenty of villainy, with dramatic retribution for the villains, and a thin but coherent thread of love-interest."

A review in The Australian Town and Country Journal agreed with this assessment: "It is needless to say of so famous a writer that the natural scenery and general atmosphere are graphically and accurately depicted, with the sure touch of one familiar with his mise-en-scene, while the story itself, if by no means sensational, contains some good character sketches, and a simple if somewhat conventional plot with a satisfactory conclusion."

== Publication history ==
After its original book publication in England in 1904 the novel was later published as follows:

- George Bell, UK, 1905
- T. Fisher Unwin, UK, 1905

The book was serialised in The Western Mail (Perth) from 18 March 1905.

== See also ==
- 1904 in Australian literature
