= The Lust of Hate =

Novel by Australian writer Guy Boothby

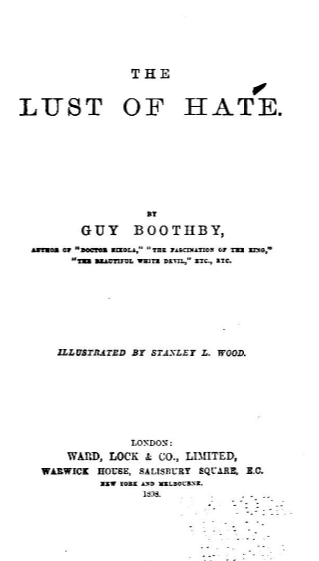
- Title page for The Lust of Hate (1898)
- Author: Guy Boothby
- Language: English
- Series: Dr. Nikola
- Genre: Fiction
- Publisher: Ward, Lock and Bowden
- Publication date: 1896
- Publication place: U.K.
- Media type: Print
- Pages: 322 pp
- Preceded by: Doctor Nikola
- Followed by: Dr Nikola's Experiment

The Lust of Hate (1897) is a novel by Australian writer Guy Boothby. It was his third novel to feature his recurring character Dr. Nikola. It was originally serialised in several Australian newspapers in 1897, (including The Age, The Adelaide Observer, The Evening Journal and The Queenslander) before it was then published in book form in the United Kingdom by Ward, Lock and Bowden in 1898.

== Abstract ==
"In this the third of Boothby's Dr. Nikola novels, Nikola applies his almost hypnotic persuasion to convince an out-of-luck Australian, formerly from England, named Gilbert Pennethorne to assist Nikola unwittingly in an evil scheme. Nikola takes advantage of Pennethorne's intense desire for revenge against a former boss in Australia who stole information about the location of a gold field that would have made Pennethorne immensely wealthy.

"Using that information the boss made himself rich, living a high life in London, while Pennethorne remained penniless. Nikola contrives a plan and a device for Pennethorne to commit the perfect murder of the wealthy thief. Unknowingly, Pennethorne thus becomes a party to another one of Nikola's insidious schemes."

== Publishing history ==
Following the book's initial newspaper serialisation, and then publication by Ward, Lock and Bowden in 1898 it was subsequently published as follows:

- Appleton, 1898, USA

The novel was translated into Danish (1916).

== Critical reception ==
A reviewer in the Australian Town and Country Journal noted that the book "will certainly not rank among the best of his works, being indeed of an obviously pot-boiler type–even shipwrecks, gold rushes, and attacks by Matabele are apt to pall, and excursions from England to Australia and back again, and thence to South Africa, provide a species of variety which may become simply monotonous." They concluded that the "various improbable coincidences assist in giving the whole book an air of unreality."

The reviewer in the Sydney Mail agreed: "though as chock full of adventure as previous volumes — much more so, in fact — does not mark any advance in his art, and is certainly not up to the standard of Dr. Nikola."

== See also ==
- 1897 in Australian literature
