= A Cabinet Secret =

1900 novel by Australian author Guy Boothby

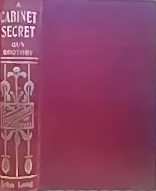
- Author: Guy Boothby
- Language: English
- Genre: Novel
- Publisher: George Bell and Sons
- Publication date: November 1900
- Publication place: Australia
- Media type: Print
- Pages: 306 pp.
- Preceded by: A Sailor's Bride
- Followed by: "Long Live the King!"

A Cabinet Secret is a 1900 novel by the Australian author Guy Boothby.

The first edition was published in November 1900, though dated 1901.

== Synopsis ==
During the Boer War, a secret council of men succeeds in blowing up the Woolwich Royal Arsenal, assassinating the Prime Minister of Great Britain, and causing the disappearance of two British Cabinet Ministers, the Commander-in-Chief of the British Army along with the Commander-in-Chief of the British forces in South Africa.

== Publishing history ==
After its initial publication in UK by George Bell and Sons in 1900, it was reprinted as follows:

- 1900–1909, UK, John Long
- 1901, UK, F. V. White
- 1901, USA, Lippincott
- 1912, UK, John Long

== Critical reception ==
A reviewer in the Sydney Evening News was not impressed with the work: "He is not a great novelist, far from it. He has never given us characters which will endure in popular memory, whose sayings will pass into literature, and who will become ascharacter subjects for the painter...But A Cabinet Secret, interesting as it undoubtedly is to those who read for sensation alone, is very far from the level on which Mr. Boothby had established."

In the Examiner (Launceston, Tasmania) the reviewer was rather more enthusiastic: "Mr. Boothby is never at a loss for something original in the way of plot or something exciting in the matter of detail, and he has combined both in this work. It deals with a supposed danger to which Great Britain was exposed at the opening of the Boer war from the plots of a crew of conspirators who kidnap or assassinate the principal members of the Cabinet and the leading generals. The story is told in terse style, situations following each other in rapid succession, and to those who like that class of work the 'Cabinet Secret' will be full of interest."

== See also ==
- 1900 in Australian literature
