= A Rose of Regret =

Poetry collection by James Hebblethwaite

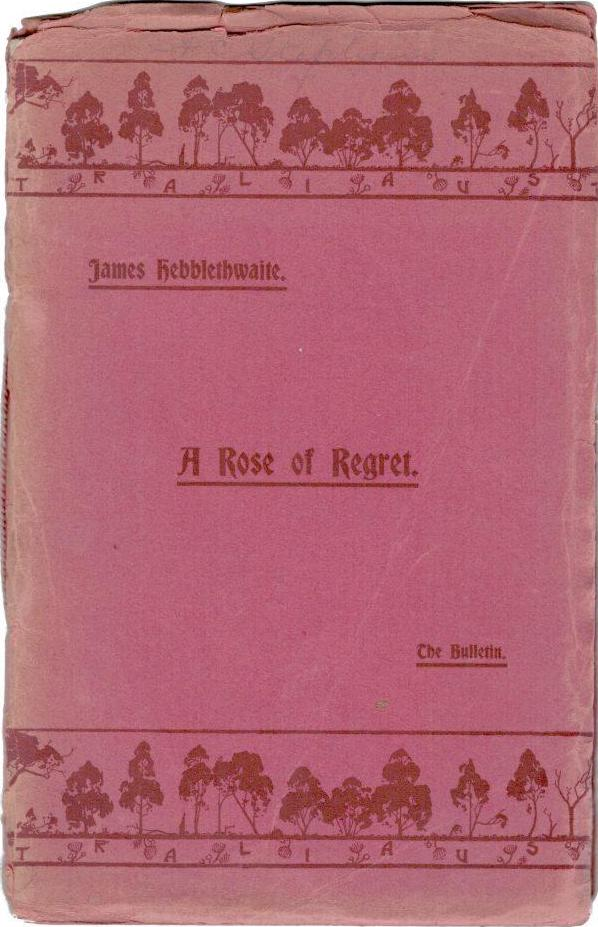
- Author: James Hebblethwaite
- Language: English
- Genre: Poetry
- Publisher: Bulletin Booklets
- Publication date: 1900
- Publication place: Australia
- Media type: Print (Hardback)
- Pages: 34
- Followed by: Meadow and Bush : A Book of Verses

A Rose of Regret is a collection of poems by Australian poet James Hebblethwaite. It was published in hardback by The Bulletin magazine in 1900, as part of their Bulletin Booklets range, being the 2nd in that series.

The original collection includes 28 poems by the author that are reprinted from various sources, with some appearing here for the first time. It also includes a postscript "Personal Note" by A. G. Stephens.

== Contents ==
- "Like the Scent of Violet"
- "Home"
- "A Night-Watch"
- "Provence"
- "Old Catalogues"
- "Love in the Ruins"
- "Ulysses"
- "One Memory"
- "Perdita"
- "The Sirens"
- "The Symbol"
- "Strolling Players"
- "The Quiet Life, Marion Bay"
- "Longing"
- "Old Authors"
- "The Children's Minuet"
- "Lament"
- "Dead Island (Port Arthur)"
- "Rejected"
- "Dream-Echo"
- "Life"
- "France"
- "The Forest"
- "The Silver Falls"
- "Wanderers"
- "Spring"
- "Passing"
- "The Quest"

== Critical reception ==
A reviewer in the South Australian Register noted that: "The cadences of the poet's song incline towards melancholy, but his method is attractive, and his quiet power in apparent in every page."

In The Queenslander the reviewer stated: "In it there is much to enjoy, much to turn on the palate, and if the distinctive Australian note that marked many of his predecessors is absent there is for compensation quiet strains of music in a minor key—simple unaffected little melodies of no particular genius, or absorbing passion, but, instead, with a tinge of homely sadness, and carrying the story of a life done in vignettes."

== See also ==
- 1900 in poetry
- 1900 in Australian literature
