= Edward Barry: South Sea Pearler =

1900 novel by Australian writer Louis Becke

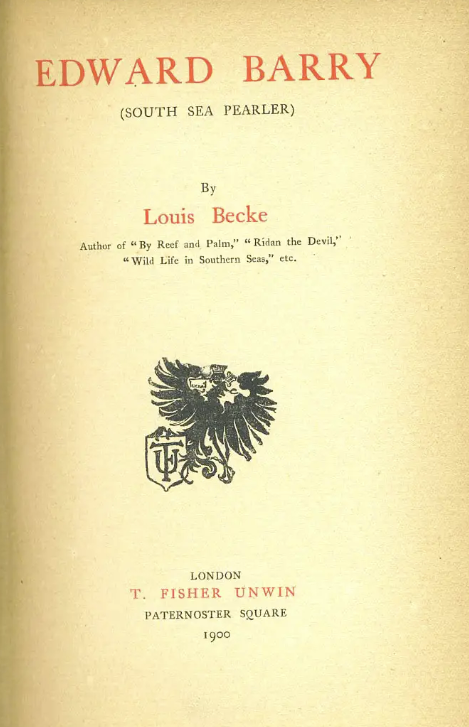
- Title page for Edward Barry: South Sea Pearler (1900)
- Author: Louis Becke
- Language: English
- Genre: Fiction
- Publisher: T. Fisher Unwin
- Publication date: 1900
- Publication place: Australia
- Media type: Print
- Pages: 246 pp.
- Preceded by: Tom Wallis : A Tale of the South Seas
- Followed by: Breachley, Black Sheep

Edward Barry: South Sea Pearler (1900) is a novel by Australian writer Louis Becke. It was originally published in 1900 in England by publishers T. Fisher Unwin

== Synopsis ==
Penniless in Sydney, Edward Barry ships on board the brig Mahina as Chief Mate, working his passage to Arrecifos Lagoon. But he soon discovers all is not well on the ship and he sets out to investigate the cause of death of his predecessor. At the lagoon he meets the late Mate's widow who informs him about what happened to her husband.

== Critical reception ==
A reviewer in The Advertiser (Adelaide) noted: "Edward Barry is a good specimen of the class of fiction of which Mr. Becke is so successful a cultivator, in which violent action and stirring incident are set in a framework of romantic scenery, and among people of a primitive type."

A writer in the Sunday Times (Sydney) was not overly impressed with the work: "The story, so far as it describes the islands, natives, and the voyage, is interesting; but the love-making and the working out of the plot are somewhat crude and disappointing."

== Publication history ==
After its original book publication in Engl;and the novel was later published as follows:

- L. C. Page, USA, 1924
- Thomas Allen & Son Limited, Canada, 1929

The book was serialised in The Daily Telegraph (Sydney) in 1900, and later in several other newspapers.

The novel was also translated into Swedish (1922) and Finnish (1927).

== See also ==
- 1900 in Australian literature
