= Electoral Act 1856 =

Act providing for the election of the first parliament of Victoria

Victorian Legislative Council
- Long title: An Act to provide for the Election of Members to serve in the Legislative Council and Legislative Assembly of Victoria respectively.
- Citation: 19 Vict. No. 12
- Territorial extent: Victoria
- Passed by: Legislative Council
- Passed: 13 March 1856
- Royal assent: 19 March 1856
- Effective: 26 March 1856
- Repealed: 10 July 1890

Legislative history
- Bill title: Victoria Electoral Bill
- Introduced by: William Stawell
- Introduced: 27 November 1855
- First reading: 28 November 1855
- Second reading: 9 January 1856
- Third reading: 13 March 1856

Repealed by
- Constitution Act Amendment Act 1890 (54 Vict. No. 1075)
- Status: Repealed

The Electoral Act 1856 (19 Vict. No. 12) was an act of the Victorian Legislative Council which provided for the election of members of the first Parliament of Victoria later that year. Besides providing for the division of the colony into provinces and districts for the election of members of Parliament, for the creation of an electoral roll and for other matters, the act also introduced voting by secret ballot in the colony of Victoria. It provided for a government–supplied ballot paper containing each candidates' names. The elector was required to cross out the name of those candidates he (and it was only he) did not wish to vote for, fold the ballot paper in a way that the vote could not be seen and place the ballot paper in a ballot box in view of the polling officers.

The act was passed by a one-vote majority in the outgoing Legislative Council on 13 March 1856, and received assent from the Governor of Victoria on 19 March of the same year, in time for the election of the new Parliament of Victoria later that year. The innovation of the secret ballot was pioneered in Victoria by the former mayor of Melbourne, William Nicholson.

Victoria was the fourth jurisdiction in the world to enacted a law for a secret ballot. France adopted a secret ballot law in 1795. The movement for a secret ballot in South Australia was led by pioneer and advocate South Australian Electoral Commissioner William Boothby. Tasmania adopted a secret ballot law on 7 February 1856. South Australia enacted a similar law two weeks after the Victorian law, on 2 April 1856. The South Australian system in 1858 required an elector to place an ✗ against the name of his preferred candidate instead of crossing out unwanted names and for the ballot paper to show 'no other matter or thing' apart from the names of candidates and on the back the returning officer's initials. The other Australian colonies followed the SA example: New South Wales (1858), Queensland (1859), and Western Australia (1877). New Zealand implemented secret voting in 1870.

When the secret ballot was adopted in the United States, it was called 'the Australian ballot'.
