= E. J. Brady =

Australian journalist and poet

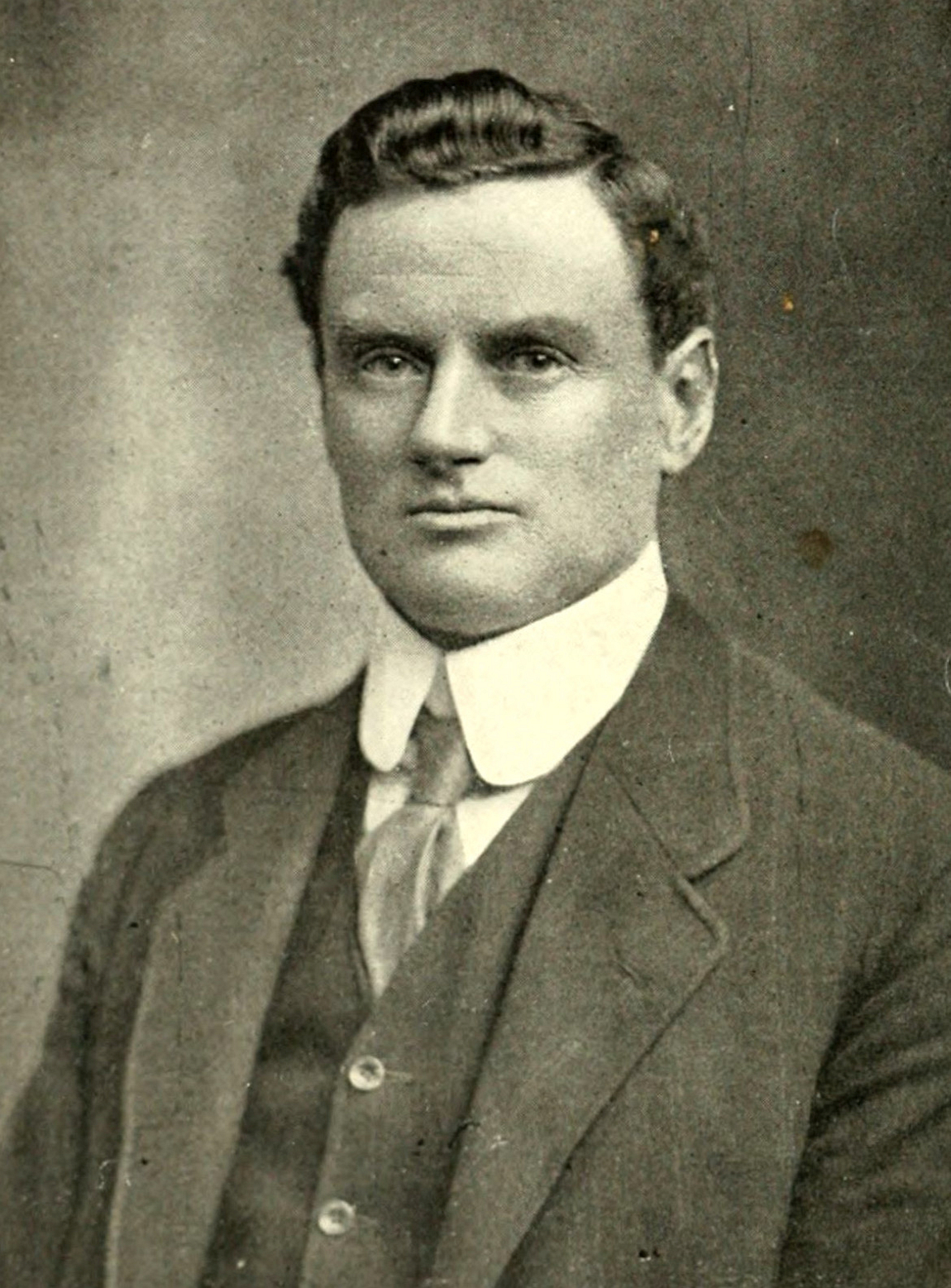
- Brady c. 1911
- Born: Edwin James Brady; 7 August 1869; Carcoar, New South Wales, Australia
- Died: 22 July 1952 (aged 82); Pambula, New South Wales, Australia
- Other name: Nedi Woolli
- Occupations: Poet, journalist

Edwin James Brady (7 August 1869 – 22 July 1952) was an Australian journalist and poet.

== Personal life ==
From Irish parents, Brady was born at Carcoar, New South Wales, and was educated both in the United States and Sydney, Australia. Among his school friends were Christopher Brennan and Roderic Quinn.

He worked as a wharf clerk, a farmer, and journalist, and edited both rural and city newspapers.

His political leanings were as a confirmed socialist, and secretary of the first Socialist League of Australia, in Sydney, 1890. It was suggested that Brady and fellow poet Henry Lawson contemplated with becoming 'New Australians' at the 1893 New Australia settlement in Paraguay, away from the influences of capitalism.

== Career ==
Brady was a friend with poets Will H. Ogilvie (1869–1963), Roderic Quinn (1867–1949)), Banjo Paterson (1864–1941) and Henry Lawson (1867–1922). Several of those individuals were also members of the Bohemian group, the Dawn and Dusk Club, with Brady being the last. In 1910, Brady took Lawson on a poets' retreat, restoring Lawson's health.

He was the editor of the Australian Workman, Sydney's first trade union newspaper, in 1891-92. The Bulletin and the Sunday Times were the repositories for many of his poems and prose. In 1899, equipped with a notebook, gun, and camera, Brady drove a wagon from Sydney to Townsville (although intending to reach the Gulf of Carpentaria) and back, recording the lives of the settlers.

Working at Grafton's Daily Examiner in New South Wales, Brady wrote under the pen-name Nedi Woolli. The first name was an extension of Quinn's name for Brady, and the last name being an indigenous name relating to the Yamba area; with Quinn normally calling him Ned. He later took over The Grip newspaper, but 'it went 'straight on the rocks' '.

Brady later established a writers' and artists' colony at Mallacoota, Victoria in 1909, and he continued to live there until his death.

He chronicled an eventful journey down the Murray River in a small motor boat from Albury to the coast in 1911 in River Rovers.

A passionate nationalist, he achieved his greatest fame with his book Australia Unlimited, a bestseller from its appearance in 1918, which urged dramatic increases in the national population. In 1926, a book entitled Industrial Australia was being written about the history and growth of industry within the country. His last work Two Frontiers was published in 1945. He also sought to write the biography of The Bulletin co-founder J. F. 'Archie' Archibald. Publishers refused to print the biography.

Lines from his poem Far and Wide have been used in the Melbourne tourism advertisement running on ESPN2 and Tennis Channel during the 2016, 2017, and 2018 Australian Open.

I'll call you to the beaches,

And you shall bide with me

Along the river reaches

And by the open sea.

== Later life ==
Brady, given as tall and debonair, in 1890 married Marion Cecilia Walsh; and in June 1895, married Annie Creo Dooley née Stanley, in June 1895. Aged 72, he married Florence Jane Bourke in 1942 in Victoria, and had a daughter.

After retiring, he continued living in a tent home in Mallacoota.

Aged 82, Brady died in 1952 at the Pambula Public Hospital of a heart condition. He was survived by his third wife, and six children from his first marriage.

== Bibliography ==
=== Poetry ===
- The Ways of Many Waters, 1899
- The Earthen Floor, Grip Newspaper Company, 1902
- Bushland Ballads, 1910
- Bells and Hobbles, 1911
- The House of the Winds, 1919
- Wardens of the Seas, Endeavour Press, Sydney, 1933
- They Shall Be Remembered: A poem dedicated to the heroes of Second World War, also called Australia Remembers: Pte. C. J. Williams, Stubbs Publishing, 1946

=== Prose ===
- Sydney Harbour, Builder Printing Works, 1903
- Sydney: The Commercial Capital of the Commonwealth, Builder Printing Works, 1904
- Picturesque Port Phillip, George Robertson & Co, 1911
- The King's Caravan: Across Australia in a Wagon, Edward Arnold, 1911
- The River Rovers, George Robertson & Co, 1911
- Tom Pagdin pirate, NSW Bookstall, 1911 — illustrated by Lionel Lindsay
- Australia Unlimited, 1918 — of one thousand quarto pages in size, a picturesque description of Australia's life and resources, selling of 10 000 copies, and costing £2/2/– each. It took six years to research and write
- The Land of the Sun, Edward Arnold, 1924
- The Overlander: Prince's Highway, Ramsay Publishing, 1926
- Doctor Mannix: Archbishop of Melbourne, Library of National Biography, 1934
- Two Frontiers, Frank Johnson, 1944 — biography of Edward John Brady (1830–1914)
- Dreams and Realities, co-authored with Leslie Rubenstein, York Press, 1944

== Manuscript Archives ==
- Guide to the Papers of E. J. Brady at National Library of Australia
- Edwin James Brady papers, 1892-1951, State Library of New South Wales A 3173 'Australia unlimited, why and how I wrote it. A 3174 'Murray River Irrigation. Clippings, articles, notes, correspondence' and maps, 1908-1950. A 3175 'Personalia': letters, notes, portraits and printed material about and by Brady's ancestors and relations, with personal notes and photographs, 1892-1951. A 3176/1-A 3176/2 'Utopias Ltd: William Lane's settlement in Paraguay, New Italy Mission and Madagascar, Ralahine, Civat-Hein and the Mallacoota Community farm.
- Edwin James Brady papers, 1899-1922 at State Library of New South Wales. A 1586 Australian artists' biographies, 1911, A 1726 Letters from Australian writers and others, 1899-1922, B 762 King's caravan : diary, 1899-1900, C 318 Verses, 1909-1911.
