= Three Little Maids (Turner novel) =

Australian children's novel

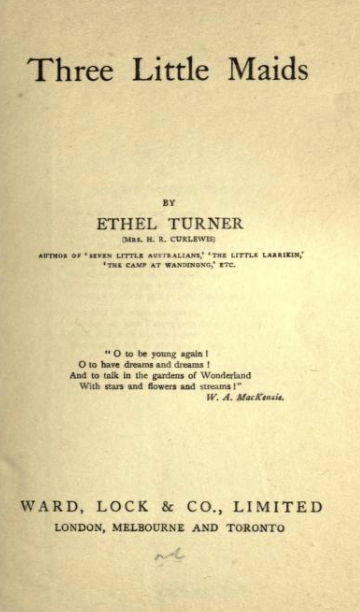
- Title page for Three Little Maids (1900)
- Author: Ethel Turner
- Language: English
- Genre: Fiction
- Publisher: Ward, Lock & Co.
- Publication date: 1900
- Publication place: Australia
- Media type: Print
- Pages: 315 pp
- Preceded by: Gum Leaves
- Followed by: Wonder Child

Three Little Maids (1900) is a novel for children by Australian writer Ethel Turner. It was originally published in the UK by Ward, Lock & Co. in 1900, and subsequently serialised in the Australian Town and Country Journal between July and October 1900 in 26 instalments.

== Abstract ==
"It is the history of a family of girls, whose mother was compelled to bring them out to Australia. They are forced for a time to live in great stress in an inland town in New South Wales in juxtaposition to an Australian family, composed of an engrossed father, a weak mother, and five rough boys. The way, it will be seen, is prepared for a series of adventures and experiences in child life. The sketch of the foolish scolding mother of the boys, unequal to her responsibilities, reveals a familiar character. "

== Publishing history ==
Following the book's initial publication by Ward, Lock & Co. in 1900 it was subsequently published as follows:

- David McKay, Girls' Own Library, 1900-09 (??), USA
- Ward, Lock & Co., 1949, UK
- Halstead Press, 2002, Australia

== Critical reception ==
A reviewer in The Daily Telegraph from Sydney was impressed with the book: "'Three Little Maids' (Ward, Lock, and Co.), which we have from William Dymock, is Ethel Turner's latest romance of youth, and assuredly one of the most pleasing and piquant chronicles of the wonderland of girlhood that has been yet published. The story as a whole has no remarkable feature — it needs none. The value of such tales as this is in what each chapter brings forth of delight and sorrow, of hope, wonder, aspiration, and adventure to the little people; of their progress through flowers and thorn thickets towards the enlightenment, and too often the sadness, of adult life. Miss Turner's place among those who write of children with sympathy, in sight, and especial charm has already been firmly established. This record of the experiences of Phyl, Dolly, and Weenie will add to her reputation and to the host of her young friends."

The book's reviewer in The Sydney Morning Herald saw the wider appeal of the book, noting it "is one of those delightful stories of child life in Australia with which this author has made us pleasantly familiar. In this case the little maids are of English birth, and much of the story is taken up with the adventures of five or six Australian boys, and with the various husbands of the mother of the maids. But one must not be too exacting in regard to such books, which are written mainly for the young. Mrs. Curlewis has the happy knack of interesting older people also, by reason of the realness of the children whom she creates. It is impossible to rise from the reading of one of her books without wishing to see in the flesh the 'Phyl' or the 'Dolly' or the 'Weenie' or the other children whom she has so sympathetically pictured for us."

== Note ==
- The Australian Dictionary of Biography entry on Ethel Turner notes this as an "autobiographical novel" that "describes her mother's struggle to maintain her family in genteel poverty and presents the third marriage as a means of rescue."

== See also ==
- 1900 in Australian literature
