= Ethel Castilla =

Australian poet and short story writer (1861–1937)

- Born: Ethelrita Ramos de Castilla; 19 June 1861; Kyneton, Colony of Victoria
- Died: 27 March 1937 (aged 75); Camberwell, Victoria, Australia
- Occupations: Journalist; poet; short story writer
- Relatives: Amy Castilla (sister)

Ethel Castilla (19 June 1861 – 27 March 1937) was an Australian journalist, poet and short story writer. She was one of the founders of the Austral Salon and is best known for her poem, "The Australian Girl".

== Early life and family ==
Ethelrita Ramos de Castilla was born in Kyneton, Victoria on 19 June 1861, daughter of May or Mary (née Robertson) and Frederic Ramos de Castilla. Her father, of Spanish descent, was a merchant and property speculator who in 1863 was in debt to the tune of £1,322 net. He sought release from insolvency in 1864 and died in Kew, Victoria in 1869. Her mother, a daughter of John Anderson Robertson, a Scotsman and Edinburgh writer to the signet, died in 1910. Her younger sister, Amy Castilla (1868–1898) was a medical practitioner and co-founder of the Queen Victoria hospital in Melbourne. In 1884 Castilla passed the University of Melbourne's matriculation examination.

== Career ==
Castilla contributed Melbourne news to The Sydney Mail and New South Wales Advertiser and worked for the Melbourne Daily Telegraph and the Weekly Times. She wrote art criticism using the pseudonym Viva. She contributed short stories and poems to The Leader (1889–1904) and The Sydney Mail and New South Wales Advertiser (1890–1906). She also wrote poems for The Australasian (1904–1913) and articles for The Sydney Morning Herald, including a series on "The Flower of the Month".

In 1890 she was one of the founders of the Austral Salon, a Melbourne meeting place for women intellectuals. She regularly presented papers at meetings, including on "The Payment of Women", in which she "gave appalling statistics" and "oft-time painful information", concluding with a call for a union for women workers. She nicknamed the club, "The Hen Roost". In 1895, she, together with all the other founders were voted honorary life members of the Austral Salon.

Her best known poem, "The Australian Girl", was first published in The Weekly Times and its associated Victorian country newspapers on 17 September 1887. It was quoted at the Royal Colonial Institute in London by Professor Anderson Stuart of the University of Sydney. The poem was included in an English anthology, Australian Ballads and gave its name to her 1900 collection, for which Rolf Boldrewood wrote a "most complimentary preface". The book was accepted by Queen Victoria as a gift, having been sent to London by the Governor of Victoria, Lord Brassey.

Her poems, "The Australian Girl" and "A Song of Sydney", were included in Bertram Stevens' 1907 An Anthology of Australian verse.

In the 1920s she served as honorary secretary of the Camberwell Municipal Library Committee and wrote letters to The Age, The Argus and the Box Hill Reporter to garner support.

== Death ==
She died at Camberwell, Victoria on 27 March 1937.

== Selected works ==
- Castilla, Ethel (1900). The Australian Girl, and Other Verses. G. Robertson.
- "Sara Champion: A tale of the early days of Melbourne"
- "A Bush Violet"
- "The Australian Girl" (1887)
