= James Hebblethwaite =

- Born: James Hebblethwaite; 22 September 1857; Preston, Lancashire, England
- Died: 13 September 1921 (aged 63); Hobart, Tasmania, Australia
- Occupations: teacher, clergyman and writer
- Writing career
- Language: English

James Hebblethwaite (22 September 1857 – 13 September 1921) was an English-born Australian poet, teacher and clergyman. Hebblethwaite was born in Preston, Lancashire, England, the son of William Hebblethwaite, a corn miller, and his wife Margaret, née Cundall.

== Bibliography ==
=== Novel ===
- Castlehill: Or, a Tale of Two Hemispheres (1895)

=== Poetry collections ===
- Verse (1896)
- A Rose of Regret (1900)
- Meadow and Bush: A Book of Verses (1911)
- The Poems of James Hebblethwaite (1920)
- New Poems of James Hebblethwaite (1921)
