= A Child in the Dark, and a Foreign Father =

Short story by Henrty Lawson

- Short story by Henry Lawson
- Original title: A Child In The Dark: A Bush Sketch
- Language: English
- Genre: Autobiographical

Publication
- Published in: Bulletin
- Publication date: 13 December 1902

"A Child in the Dark, and a Foreign Father" is a short story by Australian author Henry Lawson. The story, often considered to be partially autobiographical, considers the rather bleak relationship between a man and his family. The story was begun in England as Lawson's first novel, but was broken off and eventually completed after his return to Australia.

== Plot summary ==
A story by Henry Lawson, was written in 1902 and included in Triangles of Life (1913). The story records the return home to his farm on New Year's Eve of a poor carpenter, who discovers that his three children and the household chores have been neglected by his neurotic and slatternly wife; after cleaning up and attending to his family during the night, the workman returns to his trade next morning. The setting of the story (Pipeclay), the fact that the foreign father's name is Nils, and the tension between the parents, suggest that the story is autobiographical.

The story begins on New Year's Eve, with a father pacing steadily and hopelessly through the smothering darkness. He arrives home to his cold and uninviting hut.

The man's oldest son emerges from the darkness. He had been feeling sick, he says. But he is better now. He would like to help his father with the cooking and cleaning, but has neither the knowledge nor the means to do so.

The man's wife, Emma, calls from her bedroom. She is currently "bad again in the head" and whines constantly about her husband's utter uselessness. Everything is his fault. The following morning, New Years Day, the man rises from his sleep and leaves for the farming town at which he works. But the new year brings neither hope nor relief- it is just the beginning of another bleak, unpromising cycle of life. "And the old year died as many old years had died."

== Characters ==
- Nils:
  - The father. He works at his trade in a farming town about five miles away from his home, and is struggling to make a farm and a home between jobs. He is constantly unappreciated by his wife, and finds little pleasure in arriving home to his family.
- Emma:
  - The mother. Though she is "a big, strong, and healthy-looking woman, with dark hair and strong, square features," she is considered to be "bad... in the head." She is convinced of her husband's uselessness, and is constantly complaining that she is misunderstood and her efforts are unappreciated, despite doing little work at all.
- Nils, the elder son, called Sonny by his father:
  - The oldest of three children in the household. "A pale, thinfaced, dark-eyed boy." He yearns to help with cooking and cleaning whenever he can, yet he lacks the knowledge and the means to do so. The father notices attempts at washing dishes and scrubbing floors that have been shortly abandoned, most likely the attempts of the oldest child.
- The second-oldest son
- The baby

== Literary significance ==
'A Child in the Dark, and a Foreign Father' is considered particularly significant, in that it was completed shortly before Lawson's attempted suicide that same year and so clearly marks the end of his creative period.

In his autobiography, Lawson quotes a friend's advice to him on a projected book about Bush people: "Treated ruthlessly, Rousseaulike, without regard to your own or others' feelings, what a notable book yours would be!" It is often believed that this story was begun under the influence of such advice.

The story itself is often read as a partial autobiography, perhaps recounting Lawson's obviously distressing childhood memories. Not unlike Lawson's famous early work, "The Drover's Wife," 'A Child in the Dark, and a Foreign Father" deals with the relationship of parent and child, but the writing style has vastly changed in the years separating the writing of the two. The sketch appears to lack the evocative impressonistic descriptions which carry so much emotional force in his best work, and is written with an impersonality of tone that is quite uncharacteristic.

== Quotes ==
- "It was so dark—with a smothering darkness—that even the low loom of the scrub-covered ridges, close at hand across the creek, was not to be seen. The sky was not clouded for rain, but with drought haze and the smoke of distant bush fires."
- "these sounded more like the footsteps of one pacing steadily to and fro, and thinking steadily and hopelessly—sorting out the past. Only the steps went on."
- "On the floor, between the sofa and the table, lay a boy—child almost—on a similar mattress, with a cover of coarse sacking, and a bundle of dirty clothes for a pillow."
- "There you go again! Flinging your money away on rubbish that’ll be on the dust-heap to-morrow, and your poor wife slaving her finger-nails off for you in this wretched hole, and not a decent rag to her back."
- "And the child knew he was watching him, and pretended to sleep, and, so pretending, he slept. And the old year died as many old years had died."
- "And so the New Year began."

== Publication Details ==
- First published: Bulletin, 13 December 1902, under the title 'A Child In The Dark: A Bush Sketch'
- Triangles Of Life, Melbourne, Standard Publishing Company (1913), Henry Lawson
