= Gilbert Mant =

Australian journalist and author

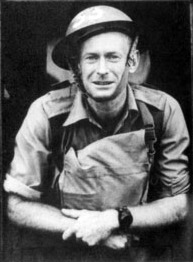
Private Gilbert Mant, 1941

Gilbert Palmer Mant (20 July 1902 – 16 February 1997) was an Australian journalist and author.

== Life and career ==
Gilbert Mant was born in Sydney. His mother was the granddaughter of the English-Australian painter and diarist Georgiana McCrae. After some years as a jackaroo he returned to Sydney and wrote as a freelance journalist in the early 1920s, often on literary topics. He worked for the Sydney Daily Telegraph from 1925 to 1930 and subsequently worked for Reuters in Australia, Britain and Canada.

Mant married Marion Carroll in Melbourne in March 1933. The couple went straight to New Zealand, where Mant was covering the tour of the English cricket team. He had been covering the Australian leg of the tour, and intended to write a book about it, but Reuters refused him permission to do so when he told them he would be critical of the bodyline tactics of the English captain Douglas Jardine. He also accompanied the next English team on its tour of Australia in 1936–37 as the Reuters correspondent.

Mant joined the Second AIF in July 1940 and served in Malaya until September 1941, when he was discharged and became a war correspondent for Reuters. He returned to Malaya for Reuters, escaping from Singapore in a British destroyer when Singapore fell to Japanese forces. He wrote the books Grim Glory (1942) and You'll Be Sorry (1944) about his experiences. His wife, who had accompanied him on many of his journalistic travels, replaced him as acting news editor of Reuters in Sydney when he enlisted. They had a daughter and a son.

Mant left Reuters in mid-1942 and became State Publicity Censor for South Australia. This position was responsible for monitoring newspapers and radio broadcasts to ensure they did not endanger wartime security. He stayed in the position until the end of the war.

Beginning in October 1945, Mant's weekly column "The Way I See It" appeared in the Sydney Sun and its successor The Sun-Herald until 1956. Covering current topics and prominent figures, and illustrated with drawings, it at first occupied a full page of the Sunday edition, then later two columns of a page.

In 1956 Mant became the public relations manager for the Royal Agricultural Society of New South Wales. He retired in 1969 and moved to Port Macquarie, where he worked part-time for The Land, mostly covering agricultural shows in northern New South Wales. He married a second time in 1963, to Yvonne Hawes.

== Books ==
- Holy Terror and Other Stories and Verse (stories, verse and sketches, 1923)
- Glamour Brat (novel, 1941)
- Grim Glory (war reporting, 1942)
- You'll Be Sorry (war reporting, 1944)
- Gone Tomorrow (novel, 1946)
- Buttercup (for children, 1969)
- The Big Show (history of the Sydney Royal Easter Show, 1972)
- A Town Called Port: A Port Macquarie-Hastings Valley Walkabout (history, 1986, with John Moyes)
- The Singapore Surrender (Grim Glory and You'll Be Sorry, published as one book, 1992)
- A Cuckoo on the Bodyline Nest (cricket history, 1992)
- Soldier Boy: The Letters of Gunner W. J. Duffell, 1915–18 (edited, 1992)
- The 20th Century Off the Record (memoir, 1994)
- Massacre at Parit Sulong (war history, 1995)
