= George Lewis Becke =

Australian author

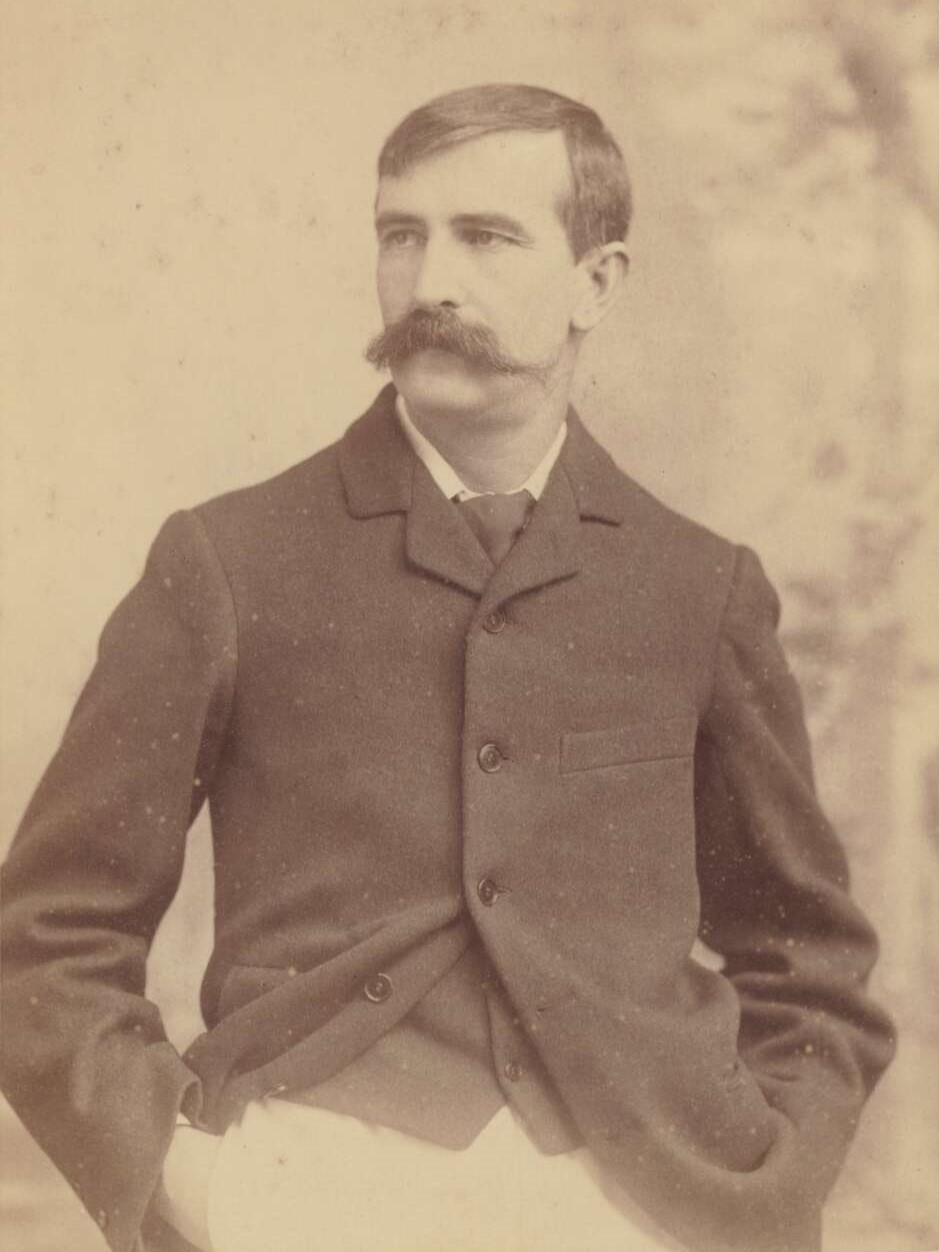
- Born: 18 June 1855; Port Macquarie, New South Wales, Australia
- Died: 18 February 1913 (aged 57); Sydney, New South Wales, Australia
- Known for: short story writer and novelist
- Spouse: Fanny Sabina Long
- Children: Nora, Niya, Alrema

George Lewis Becke (or Louis Becke; 18 June 1855 – 18 February 1913) was at the turn of the nineteenth century, the most prolific, significant, and internationally renowned Australian-born writer of the South Pacific region. Having lived and worked among Pacific Islands and Islanders as a trader, ship's supercargo, and villager for some two decades, learning languages and observing natural and cultural life, Becke was prompted by J. F. Archibald of The Bulletin to write down his experiences, eventually becoming a popular and respected author of short stories, novellas, novels, as well as historic and ethnographic works.

== Early life ==
Becke was born at Port Macquarie, New South Wales, son of Frederick Becke, Clerk of Petty Sessions and his wife Caroline Matilda, née Beilby. Both parents were born in England. The ninth of twelve children, the young Becke found walking the coastal headlands and beaches of his region, often in the company of local Australian Aboriginal people, along with sailing the local waters, much more interesting than formal schooling. However, the family moved to Hunters Hill, Sydney in 1867 and Becke was further educated at Fort Street High School, although he still preferred to go fishing.

In 1869, Becke travelled to San Francisco with his brother William Vernon and was away for nineteen months. At 16 years of age, Becke was a stowaway on a ship bound for Samoa. In Apia he took a job as a book-keeper in the store of Mrs Mary Mcfarlane which he held until some time after December 1872. Under orders of Mrs Mcfarlane, Becke sailed a ketch, the E.A. Williams to Mili Atoll to deliver it to William "Bully" Hayes, the notorious blackbirder. Beck arrived at Mili Atoll on 17 January 1874. Becke remained as a passenger on the Leonora, until the ship was wrecked on 15 March 1874 during a storm while in Lele harbour at Kosrae. It was seven months until HMS Rosario rescued Becke and the others. Becke was later arrested for piracy, but was acquitted in Brisbane at age 19. Then he tried his luck at the Palmer River goldrush, was employed at Ravenswood station and from 1878–79 and worked as a bank clerk in Townsville, Queensland. The story Nell of Mulliner's Camp is set in a mining camp in North Queensland.

From about April 1880 Becke was in the Ellice Islands (now Tuvalu) working with the Liverpool firm of John S. de Wolf and Co. on Nanumanga, until the trading-station was destroyed later that year in a cyclone. In February 1881 he opened his own store in Nukufetau, where he married Nelea Tikena. The stories that Louis Becke set in the Ellice Islands are: The Fisher Folk of Nukufetau that describes a fishing expedition, The Rangers of the Tia Kau that describes a shark attack at the Tia Kau reef between Nanumea and Nanumanga, and Kennedy the Boatsteerer that describes an attempt by a trader to escape with a woman betrothed to a Niutaon chief, which ends in tragedy.

Later in 1881 a shipwreck on Beru Island in the Gilbert Islands caused him to lose all he had; Becke then worked in New Britain and was in Majuro by November 1882. For the next ten years Becke moved about the Gilbert Islands, Ellice Islands, Caroline Islands and Marshall Islands acquiring a knowledge of the customs and beliefs of the islanders and meeting palagi traders and beachcombers that Becke later used in his stories.

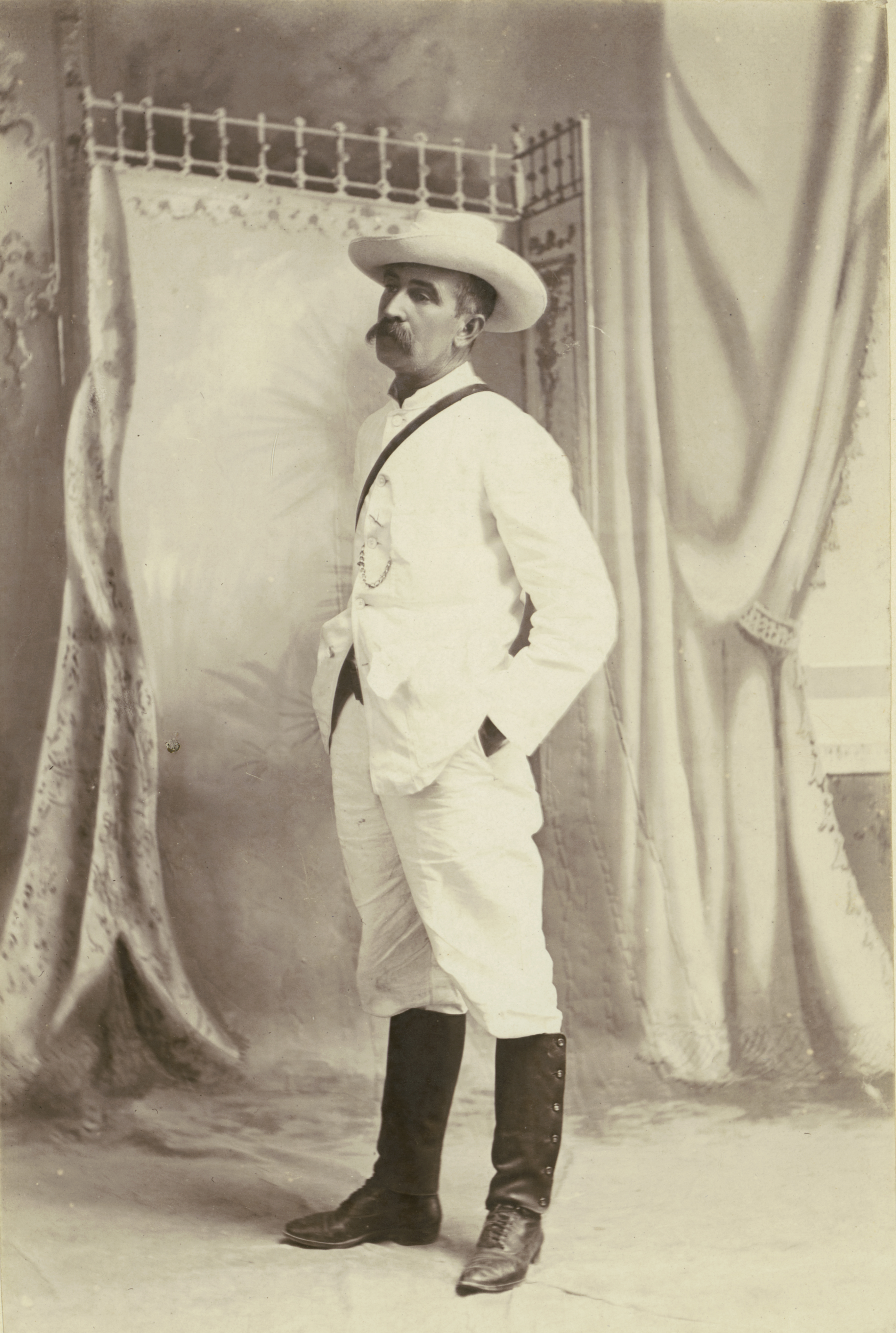
George Lewis Becke, c. 1900

Becke wrote about Bully Hayes in The Strange Adventures of James Shervinton and other stories: Captain "Bully" Hayes; Concerning "Bully" Hayes; The Wreck Of The Leonora: A Memory Of "Bully" Hayes.

Becke's earliest writing on Hayes was published, without attribution to Becke, in the novel A Modern Buccaneer (1894), which was published by Thomas Alexander Browne under the pseudonym 'Rolf Boldrewood'. Browne was the author of Robbery Under Arms and paid Becke for his recollections of "Bully" Hayes. Following publication of A Modern Buccaneer, Becke wrote to Browne protesting at the use of his manuscript without any significant change, and without attribution of Becke's contribution of the manuscript.

Becke returned to New South Wales late in 1885 and on 10 February 1886 married Mary Elizabeth (Bessie) Maunsell, the daughter of Colonel Maunsell, of Port Macquarie. On 9 November 1888 his daughter, Nora Lois, was born.

On 9 June 1896 he left Sydney for London with Nora Lois and Miss Fanny Sabrina Long. Becke and Fanny Long had 2 daughters, Alrema (born 30 October 1897) and Niya (born 27 September 1898). Bessie obtained a divorce on the grounds of desertion on 29 October 1903.

In 1908 he and his family went to Auckland, New Zealand, via Fiji; then in 1909 the family travelled to Sydney, Australia.

On 7 September 1910 he was elected a member of the Royal Society of New South Wales.

He died on 18 February 1913 at the Hotel York in Sydney and was buried in the Waverley Cemetery near to the graves of Henry Lawson and Henry Kendall.

== Literary career ==
Becke wrote stories for The Bulletin, including 'Tis in the Blood (6 May 1893). Some were collected and published in 1894 as By Reef and Palm. His Native Wife, a novelette, was published in Australia in 1895; followed by a further collection of stories, The Ebbing of the Tide, which was published in 1896.

His writings were of variable quality, but have been compared to Rudyard Kipling, Herman Melville, Joseph Conrad and Robert Louis Stevenson.

== Late life and legacy ==
Becke died on 18 February 1913.

By Reef and Palm and Ebbing of the Tide received both good reviews and strong sales; with By Reef and Palm going through seven reprints between 1894 and 1924. Almost all of Becke's works were published in America by J. B. Lippincott of Philadelphia. Becke was criticised by some reviewers for lapses in grammar and taste. His Native Wife was unfavourably received in America because of its subject matter; J. B. Lippincott also refused to publish The Mutineer: A Romance of Pitcairn Island.

His life was the subject of a 1958 ABC radio feature Becke Of The South Seas where the author was played by Bob Moore.

== Bibliography ==
=== Novels ===
- The Mystery of the Laughlin Islands (1896)
- A First Fleet Family with Walter James Jeffrey (1896)
- The Mutineer: A Romance of Pitcairn Island with Walter James Jeffrey (1898)
- Tom Wallis : A Tale of the South Seas (1900)
- Edward Barry: South Sea Pearler (1900)
- Breachley, Black Sheep (1902)
- Helen Adair (1903)
- Tom Gerrard (1904)
- The Adventures of a Supercargo (1905)
- The Adventures of Louis Blake (1909)

=== Short story collections ===
- By Reef and Palm (1894)
- The Ebbing of the Tide : South Sea Stories (1895)
- Pacific Tales (1897)
- Rodman the Boatsteerer and Other Stories (1898)
- Ridan the Devil and Other Stories (1899)
- By Rock and Pool, On an Austral Shore, and Other Stories (1901)
- Yorke the Adventurer, and Other Stories (1901)
- Tessa and the Trader's Wife (1901)
- The Tapu of Banderah with Walter James Jeffrey (1901)
- The Strange Adventure of James Shervinton and Other Stories (1902)
- Chinkie's Flat and Other Stories (1904)
- Under Tropic Skies (1904)
- The Settlers of Karossa Creek and Other Stories of Australian Bush Life (1906)
- Sketches from Normandy (1906)
- The Pearl Divers of Roncador Reef and Other Stories (1908)
- 'Neath Austral Skies (1909)
- Bully Hayes : Buccaneer, and Other Stories (1914)
- Tales from the South Seas (1929)
- South Sea Supercargo (1967)

=== Prose collections ===
- Old Convict Days with William Derrincourt (1891)
- Wild Life in Southern Seas (1897)

=== Autobiography ===
- Notes From My South Sea Log (1905)
- The Call of the South (1908)

=== Non-fiction ===
- Admiral Phillip : The Founding of New South Wales with Walter James Jeffrey (1899)
- The Naval Pioneers of Australia with Walter James Jeffrey (1899)
