= Guy Boothby =

Australian writer

- Guy Boothy in 1896
- Born: 13 October 1867; Adelaide, Colony of South Australia
- Died: 26 February 1905 (aged 37); Boscombe, United Kingdom
- Resting place: Wimborne Road Cemetery, Boscombe
- Occupations: Colonial administrator Author
- Relatives: T. Wilde Boothby (father); Benjamin Boothby (grandfather); William Boothby (uncle)
- Writing career
- Genres: Ghost stories Adventure; Travel
- Notable work: Dr Nikola series

Signature
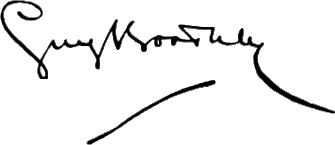

Guy Newell Boothby (13 October 1867 – 26 February 1905) was a prolific Australian novelist and writer, noted for sensational fiction in variety magazines around the end of the nineteenth century. He lived mainly in England. He is best known for such works as the Dr Nikola series, about an occultist criminal mastermind who is a Victorian forerunner to Fu Manchu, and Pharos, the Egyptian, a tale of Gothic Egypt, mummies' curses and supernatural revenge. Rudyard Kipling was his friend and mentor, and his books were remembered with affection by George Orwell.

== Biography ==
Boothby was born in Adelaide to a prominent family in the recently established British colony of South Australia. His father was Thomas Wilde Boothby, who for a time was a member of the South Australian Legislative Assembly, three of his uncles were senior colonial administrators, and his grandfather was Benjamin Boothby (1803–1868), controversial judge of the Supreme Court of South Australia from 1853 to 1867. When Boothby was aged approximately seven his English-born mother, whom he held in great regard, separated from his father and returned with her children to England. There he received a traditional English grammar school education at Salisbury, Lord Weymouth's Grammar (now Warminster School) and Christ's Hospital, London.

Following this, Boothby returned alone to South Australia at 16, where he entered the colonial administration as private secretary to the mayor of Adelaide, Lewis Cohen, but was "not contented" with the work. In 1890, aged 23, Boothby wrote the libretto for Sylvia, a comic opera, published and produced at Adelaide in December 1890, and in 1891 his second show, The Jonquil: an Opera, appeared. He also wrote and performed in an operetta, Dimple's Lovers, for Adelaide's Garrick Club theatre group. The music in each case was written by Cecil James Sharp. When severe economic collapse hit most of the Australian colonies in the early 1890s, he went to London in December 1891.

Lack of funds forced him to disembark en route in Colombo, Sri Lanka and begin making his way homewards through South East Asia. According to family legend, the dire poverty he faced on this journey led him to accept any kind of work he could get: "This meant working before the mast, stoking in ocean tramps, attending in a Chinese opium den in Singapore, digging in the Burmah Ruby fields, acting, prize fighting, cow punching..."

This was followed by a brief sojourn on Thursday Island, where he worked as a diver in the lucrative pearl trade; and finally by an arduous journey overland across the Australian continent home to Adelaide. While Depasquale, author of the only Boothby biography, warns that this account of his travels may be somewhat glamorous, Boothby certainly travelled extensively in South East Asia, Melanesia and Australia at this period, collecting a stock of colonial anecdotes and experiences that were to influence much of his later writing.

Approximately two years later, Boothby finally reached London and succeeded in having an account of his peregrinations, On the Wallaby, or Through the East and Across Australia, published in 1894. The travelogue met with reasonable success, which was matched later that year by Boothby's first novel, In Strange Company. A novel of adventure set variously in England, Australia, the South Seas and South America, In Strange Company established a pattern that was to characterise the succeeding Boothby oeuvre – the use of exotic, international and particularly Australasian locales that frequently function as an end in themselves superfluous to the requirements of plot. By October 1895, Boothby had completed three further novels, including A Bid for Fortune, the first Dr Nikola novel which catapulted Boothby to wide acclaim. Of the two other novels Boothby wrote in 1895 A Lost Endeavour was set on Thursday Island and The Marriage of Esther ranged across several Torres Strait Islands. Boothby continued to produce fiction at a ferocious rate, producing up to six novels a year across the range of genres prevalent at the fin de siècle, and is credited with producing over 53 novels in total, not to mention dozens of short stories and plays.

== Death ==
Boothby died at his home, aged 38 years, in Boscombe, near Bournemouth, from complications arising from influenza on 26 February 1905. His grave is in the town's Wimborne Road Cemetery.

== Writing ==
Some of Boothby's earlier works relate to stories of Australian life, but later he turned to genre fiction, including crime fiction, imperial romance, science fiction and Gothic horror. Boothby's oeuvre is pervaded by an array of intriguing and subversive villains whose larger than life characters eclipse the unremarkable English protagonists. They range from the classic supernatural fiends of fin-de-siècle gothic, to deformed freaks (a particular penchant of Boothby's), to sophisticated international master criminals that anticipate the adversaries of Ian Fleming's James Bond character. In their depiction of the international master criminal and the revenge of the undead ancient Egyptian, Boothby's novels were influential in establishing two key tropes of the cinematic age, which persist long after the novels themselves have faded into obscurity.

In a short article about a book by Boothby's brother, Ben, who completed some unfinished stories of Boothby, the reviewer refers to Guy Boothby's "irritating mannerisms, the trickily sensational chapter endings, the long recapitulation of preceding events, and the frequent introduction of the first person singular."

== The Dr Nikola Series ==
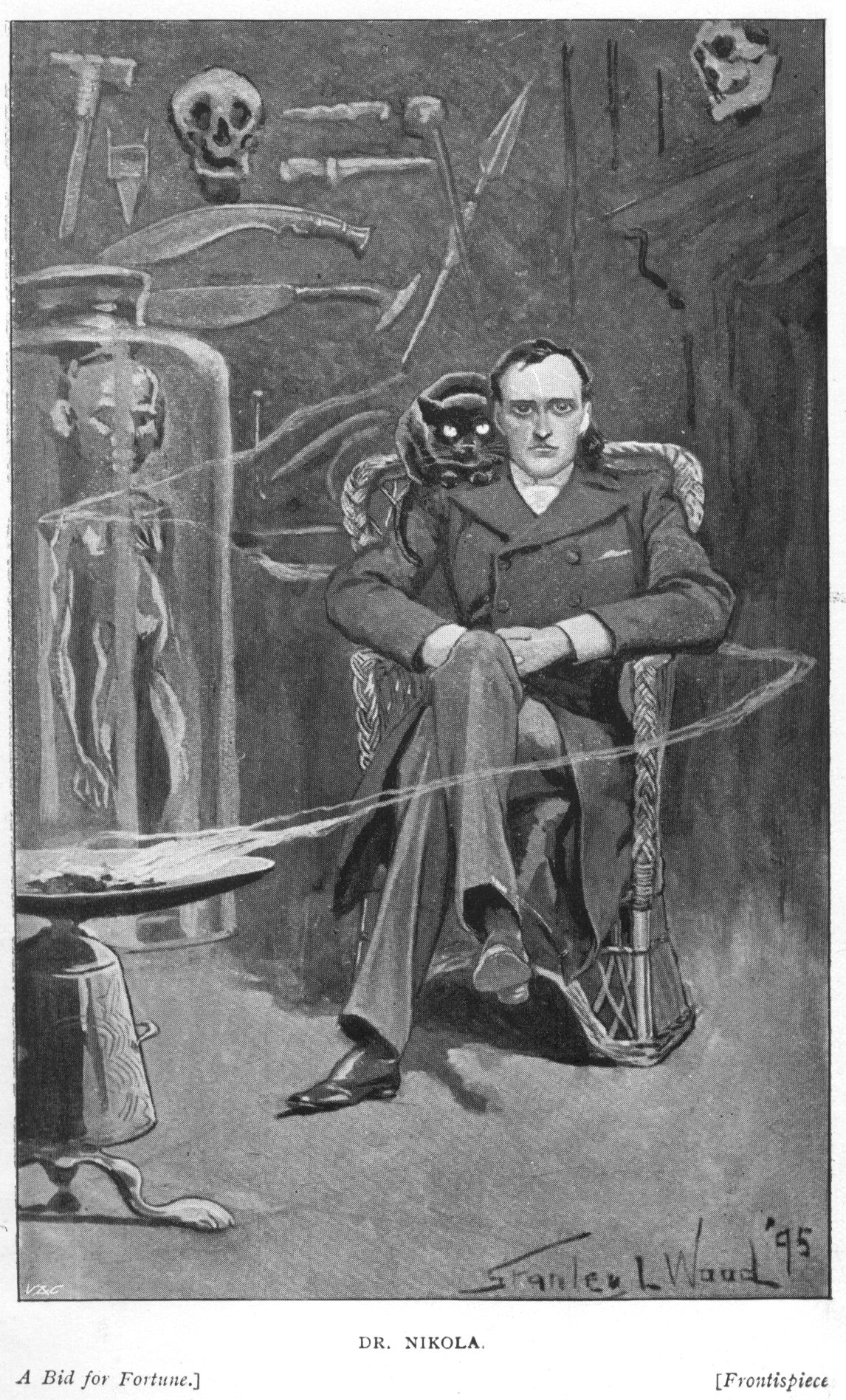
Frontispiece for A Bid for Fortune showing Doctor Nikola and cat, illustrated by Stanley L. Wood

Boothby was once well known for his series of novels about Doctor Nikola, an occultist anti-hero seeking immortality and world domination. The adventures of Nikola were launched with the first episode of A Bid for Fortune which was serialised in The Windsor Magazine (a rival to The Strand Magazine). Nikola is described as dressing in "faultless evening dress, slender, having dark peculiar eyes and dark hair, and white toad-coloured skin." He lives in a bungalow on the Rue de Lafayette in Shanghai. Stanley L. Wood often illustrated the Nikola stories and his portraits depict Dr Nikola in white cravat and fur coat, with his perennial companion, the black cat Apollyon (named after a dark angel) perched on Nikola's shoulder. Nikola is highly intelligent but unscrupulous.

John Clute writes that "The heart of the series is devoted to the Doctor's convoluted search for a Tibetan process that will resuscitate the dead and ensure immortality in the living, and there are some hints that – unhampered by compunctions, armed with psi powers and blessed with a powerful experimental intellect – he may have reached his goal."

Dr Nikola starred in a play The Adventures of Dr. Nikola by Ben Landeck and Oswald Brand, which ran briefly in London in 1902.

== Other novels ==
In A Prince of Swindlers he created the character of Simon Carne, a gentleman thief in the Raffles mould, with an alter ego as the eccentric detective Klimo. Carne first appeared in Pearson's Magazine in 1897, predating Raffles by two years.

Pharos the Egyptian (1899) is a thriller with romance and some supernaturalism in which a very sinister old man, Pharos, proves to be Ptahmes, a mummy who has survived through the centuries with full magical powers.

The Curse of the Snake (1902) is referred to by Brian Stableford as the most interesting of Boothby's novels. However, Stableford states that Boothby "very obviously made up his novel plots as he went along and that therefore this novel "concludes with a woefully inadequate explanation of its marvelously creepy opening sequence."

== Ghost stories ==
Boothby wrote a number of ghost stories, mainly from his collections Uncle Joe's Legacy and Other Stories (1902) and The Lady on the Island (1904). Amongst the better known of these are "The Black Lady of Brin Tor", "A Strange Goldfield", "The Lady on the Island" and "Remorseless Vengeance." These have been reprinted in horror anthologies edited variously by Richard Dalby, Hugh Lamb, Leigh Blackmore and James Doig.

== Bibliography ==
=== Doctor Nikola ===
1. A Bid for Fortune; Or, Doctor Nikola's Vendetta (1895) (aka Enter, Dr Nikola) (note: included in the Wordsworth Editions omnibus Dr Nikola Master Criminal, 2009)
2. Doctor Nikola (1896) aka Dr. Nikola Returns (note: included in the Wordsworth Editions omnibus Dr Nikola Master Criminal, 2009)
3. The Lust of Hate (1897) (note: Dr Nikola makes only a peripheral appearance in this novel).
4. Dr Nikola's Experiment (1899)
5. Farewell, Nikola (1901)

=== Other works ===
Other books written by Guy Boothby include:

- On the Wallaby: or, Through the East and Across Australia (1894)
- In Strange Company: a Story of Chili and the Southern Seas (1894)
- A Lost Endeavour (1895)
- The Marriage of Esther: a Torres Straits Sketch (1895)
- The Beautiful White Devil (1897)
- Bushigrams (1897)
- The Fascination of the King (1897)
- The Phantom Stockman (1897)
- Sheila McLeod: a Heroine of the Back Blocks (1897)
- The Duchess of Wiltshire's Diamonds (1897)
- Across The World For a Wife (1898)
- Billy Binks, Hero: and Other Stories (1898)
- Love Made Manifest (1899)
- Pharos, The Egyptian (1899)
- The Red Rat's Daughter (1899)
- A Sailor's Bride (1899)
- A Cabinet Secret (1900)
- "Long Live the King!" (1900)
- A Maker of Nations (1900)
- A Prince of Swindlers (1900) (AKA The Viceroy's Protegé)
- The Woman of Death (1900)
- The Boundary Rider: a Play in One Act (1901)
- The Jonquil (1901)
- A Millionaire's Love Story (1901)
- My Indian Queen: Being a Record of Sir Charles Verrinder, Baronet, in the East Indies (1901)
- The Mystery of the Clasped Hands (1901)
- The Rickshaw: a Farce in Two Acts (1901)
- My Strangest Case (1901)
- The Childerbridge Mystery (1902)
- The Curse of the Snake (1902)
- The Kidnapped President (1902)
- Uncle Joe's Legacy: and Other Stories (1902)
- Connie Burt (1903)
- The Countess Londa (1903)
- The League of Twelve (1903)
- A Queer Affair (1903)
- A Two-fold Inheritance (1903)
- A Bid for Freedom (1904)
- A Bride from the Sea (1904)
- A Consummate Scoundrel (1904)
- A Desperate Conspiracy (1904)
- The Lady of the Island (1904) ("A Professor of Egyptology", "The Black Lady of Brin Tor", "A Strange Goldfield")
- An Ocean Secret (1904)
- A Brighton Tragedy (1905)
- A Crime of the Under-seas (1905)
- For Love of Her (1905)
- In Spite of the Czar (1905)
- A Lost Endeavor (1905)
- The Race of Life (1906)
- A Royal Affair: and Other Stories (1906)
- A Stolen Peer (1906)
- The Man of the Crag (1907)
- In the Power of the Sultan (1908)
