= 1894 in Australian literature =

This article presents a list of the historical events and publications of Australian literature during 1894.

== Books ==
- Rolf Boldrewood – A Modern Buccaneer
- Guy Boothby – In Strange Company : A Story of Chili and the Southern Seas
- Mary Gaunt – Dave's Sweetheart
- E. W. Hornung
  - The Boss of Taroomba
  - The Unbidden Guest
- George McIver – Neuroomia: A New Continent: A Manuscript Delivered from the Deep
- Ethel Turner – Seven Little Australians

== Short stories ==
- Louis Becke
  - By Reef and Palm
  - "A Dead Loss"
- Ernest Favenc
  - Tales of the Austral Tropics
  - "An Unquiet Spirit"
- Henry Lawson — "Bush Cats"
- Louisa Lawson – "Manager and Muddler"

== Poetry ==
- Christopher Brennan – "Towards the Source : 1894-97: 2"
- Jennings Carmichael – "A Woman's Mood"
- Victor J. Daley – "A Vision of Youth"
- Edward Dyson – "The Rescue"
- George Essex Evans – "McCarthy's Brew: A Gulf Country Yarn"
- Charles Augustus Flower – "A Thousand Miles Away"
- Henry Lawson
  - "Australian Bards and Bush Reviewers"
  - "In the Days When the World Was Wide"
  - Short Stories in Prose and Verse
- Breaker Morant – "Beyond His Jurisdiction"
- John Shaw Neilson – "Before the Looking Glass"
- Will H. Ogilvie – "The Riding of the Rebel"
- A. B. Paterson
  - "How Gilbert Died"
  - "How the Favourite Beat Us"
  - "Saltbush Bill"
  - "The Travelling Post Office"
  - "A Voice from the Town"

== Births ==
A list, ordered by date of birth (and, if the date is either unspecified or repeated, ordered alphabetically by surname) of births in 1894 of Australian literary figures, authors of written works or literature-related individuals follows, including year of death.

- 7 January – Jean Devanny, novelist (died 1962)
- 30 April – H.V. Evatt, judge, parliamentarian and writer (died 1965)
- 31 August – Albert Facey, novelist (died 1982)
- 22 October – Paul Grano, poet (died 1975)

== Deaths ==
A list, ordered by date of death (and, if the date is either unspecified or repeated, ordered alphabetically by surname) of deaths in 1894 of Australian literary figures, authors of written works or literature-related individuals follows, including year of birth.

- 28 November – Alice Ashton Eastmure, poet (born 1833)

== See also ==
- 1894 in Australia
- 1894 in literature
- 1894 in poetry
- List of years in Australian literature
- List of years in literature
