= 1898 in Australian literature =

This article presents a list of the historical events and publications of Australian literature during 1898.

== Books ==
- Louis Becke – The Mutineer: A Romance of Pitcairn Island, with Walter James Jeffrey
- Guy Boothby
  - Across the World for a Wife
  - Pharos the Egyptian
- Ada Cambridge – Materfamilias
- Mary Gaunt – Deadman's: An Australian Story
- Louise Mack – Girls Together
- Simpson Newland – Paving the Way: A Romance of the Australian Bush
- Rosa Praed – The Scourge-Stick

== Short stories ==
- Louis Becke – Rodman the Boatsteerer and Other Stories
- Rolf Boldrewood – A Romance of Canvas Town and Other Stories
- Guy Boothby – Billy Binks, Hero, and Other Stories
- Albert Dorrington – "Castro's Last Sacrament"
- Edward Dyson
  - Below and On Top
  - "The Conquering Bush"
- Henry Lawson – "Bill, the Ventriloquial Rooster"
- Ethel Mills – "A Box of Dead Roses"
- K. Langloh Parker – More Australian Legendary Tales (edited)
- Roderic Quinn – "A Stripe for Trooper Casey"
- Steele Rudd – "On Our Selection"
- Ethel Turner – The Camp at Wandinong

== Poetry ==
- E. J. Brady
  - "The Great Grey Water"
  - "Lost and Given Over"
- Christopher Brennan
  - "The Forest of Night: 1898-1902: The Twilight of Disquietude: 36"
  - "Towards the Source : 1894-97 : 25" (aka "I Am Shut Out of Mine Own Heart")
- Victor J. Daley
  - At Dawn and Dusk
  - "Correggio Jones"
- Edward Dyson – "Men of Australia"
- George Essex Evans – Loraine and Other Verses
- Ernest Favenc – "The Guard of the Northern Strait: A Song of Queensland"
- W. T. Goodge
  - "Daley's Dorg Wattle"
  - "Mulligan's Shanty"
- Henry Lawson – "Sydney-Side"
- Marion Miller Knowles – Songs from the Hills
- Breaker Morant – "Kitty's Broom"
- Will H. Ogilvie
  - "Abandoned Selections"
  - "Bowmont Water"
  - Fair Girls and Gray Horses: With Other Verses
  - "How We Won the Ribbon"
- A. B. Paterson
  - "Saltbush Bill's Gamecock"
  - "T.Y.S.O.N."
- Roderic Quinn
  - "The Camp Within the West"
  - "The Fisher"
  - "The Hidden Tide"
- Thomas E. Spencer – "How M'Dougal Topped the Score"

== Non-fiction ==
- David Carnegie – Spinifex and Sand : A Narrative of Five Years' Pioneering and Exploration in Western Australia

== Births ==
A list, ordered by date of birth (and, if the date is either unspecified or repeated, ordered alphabetically by surname) of births in 1898 of Australian literary figures, authors of written works or literature-related individuals follows, including year of death.

- 7 February – Jean Curlewis, poet and writer for children (died 1930)
- 21 February – Llywelyn Lucas, poet (died 1967)
- 3 May – Minnie Agnes Filson, poet (died 1971)
- 17 July – Richard Harry Graves, poet and novelist (died 1971)
- 23 September – Les Haylen, politician, playwright, novelist and journalist (died 1977)

== Deaths ==
A list, ordered by date of death (and, if the date is either unspecified or repeated, ordered alphabetically by surname) of deaths in 1898 of Australian literary figures, authors of written works or literature-related individuals follows, including year of birth.

- 23 March – George Robertson, bookseller (born 1825)
- 6 August – Ethel Pedley, musician and author of Dot and the Kangaroo and other works (born 1859)

== See also ==
- 1898 in Australia
- 1898 in literature
- 1898 in poetry
- List of years in Australian literature
- List of years in literature
