= Rita Martin =

English photographer

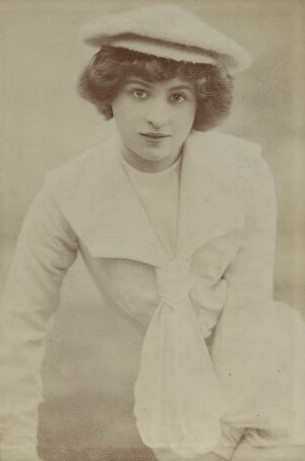
Rita Martin by Lallie Charles, c. 1907

Margareta "Rita" Weir Martin (1875–1958) was an English photographer, considered "one of the best British photographers of her time". Martin took portraits of many suffragists and was a suffragist herself.

== Early life ==
Margareta Weir Martin was born in 1875 in Ireland.

== Career ==
In 1897 Martin became a photographer working for her elder sister Lallie Charles, a society photographer. Charles' studio was called "The Nook", 1 Titchfield Road, Regent's Park, London. In 1906 she opened her own studio at 27 Baker Street. She specialized in portraits in pale colours against a pure white background. Her main subjects were actresses (Winifred Barnes, Lily Elsie, Julia James, Lily Brayton and Violet Vanbrugh) and children (Gladys Cooper's two children). She influenced many other photographers, especially in child portraits, and her influence can be seen in many of the popular French and German photographs of children taken at the beginning of the 20th century. She was inspired by Alice Hughes; other pioneer women photographers of her time are: Christina Broom, Kate Pragnell and Lizzie Caswall Smith. Talking about her, Cecil Beaton said: "Rita Martin, and the pale terracotta loveliness of her photographs are part and parcel of this period. Rita Martin and her sister, Lallie Charles, the rival photographer, posed their sitters in a soft conservatory-looking light, making all hair deliriously blonde".

A 1910 review by The Strand Magazine said "Rita Martin deserves to be singled out for praise. Perhaps a time will come when there will be annual exhibitions of the best achievements of professional photographers, as there is now for professional painters, and when that time comes the work of these artists will be highly valued by the critics. In the art of the camera as it concerns the taking of children I should put sympathy first— sympathy even before technical skill in posing and lighting." Martin took portraits of many suffragists, like Rosamund Massy, and was a suffragist herself. Martin was also a painter of miniatures.

== Legacy ==
A few negatives by Rita Martin and Lallie Charles are preserved at the National Portrait Gallery, donated by their niece Lallie Charles Martin in 1994.
