= Lallie Charles =

British photographer (1869–1919)

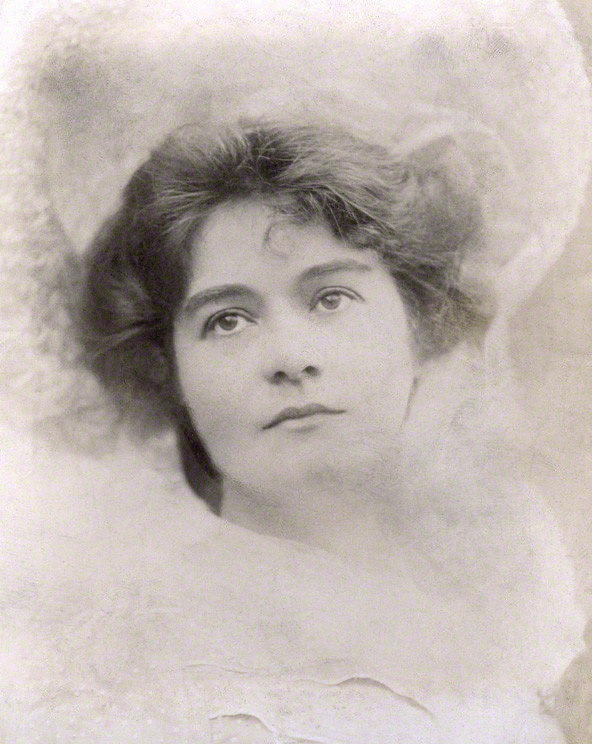
- Self-portrait, 1900s
- Born: Charlotte Elizabeth Martin; 1869; Ireland
- Died: 1919 (aged 49–50); Mayfair, London, United Kingdom
- Known for: Photography

Lallie Charles (née Charlotte Elizabeth Martin; 1869–1919), was an Irish photographer. Along with her sister Rita Martin, she was one of the most commercially successful women portraitists of the early 20th century.

Lallie Charles was born in Ireland. In about 1895, she married London photographer Georges Garet-Charles, whom she divorced around 1902. Her second husband was Herbert Carr.

She was a society photographer. In 1896, she opened her first studio, The Nook, at 1 Titchfield Road, Regent's Park, London. In 1897, Rita Martin, her sister, went to work with her. In 1906, Martin opened her own studio at 27 Baker Street and the two sisters became competitors. The following year, Charles moved to 39A Curzon Street, where she became the "foremost female portrait photographer of her day".

One of her portraits of a young girl was coloured and used as the cover image for the first issue of The Royal Magazine published by Sir Arthur Pearson in November 1898.

Charles was inspired by Alice Hughes. Other pioneer women photographers of her time, other than her sister, were: Christina Broom, Kate Pragnell and Lizzie Caswall Smith. Mme Yevonde was an apprentice of Charles, and Cecil Beaton, as a young man, posed for a family portrait, an experience he described in his book Photobiography. Talking about the sisters, Beaton said: "Rita Martin and her sister, Lallie Charles, the rival photographer, posed their sitters in a soft conservatory-looking light, making all hair deliriously fashionable to be photo-lowered". She died in Mayfair, London, on 5 April 1919.

A small selection of negatives by Lallie Charles and Rita Martin is preserved at the National Portrait Gallery, donated by their niece Lallie Charles Cowell in 1994.

== Gallery ==
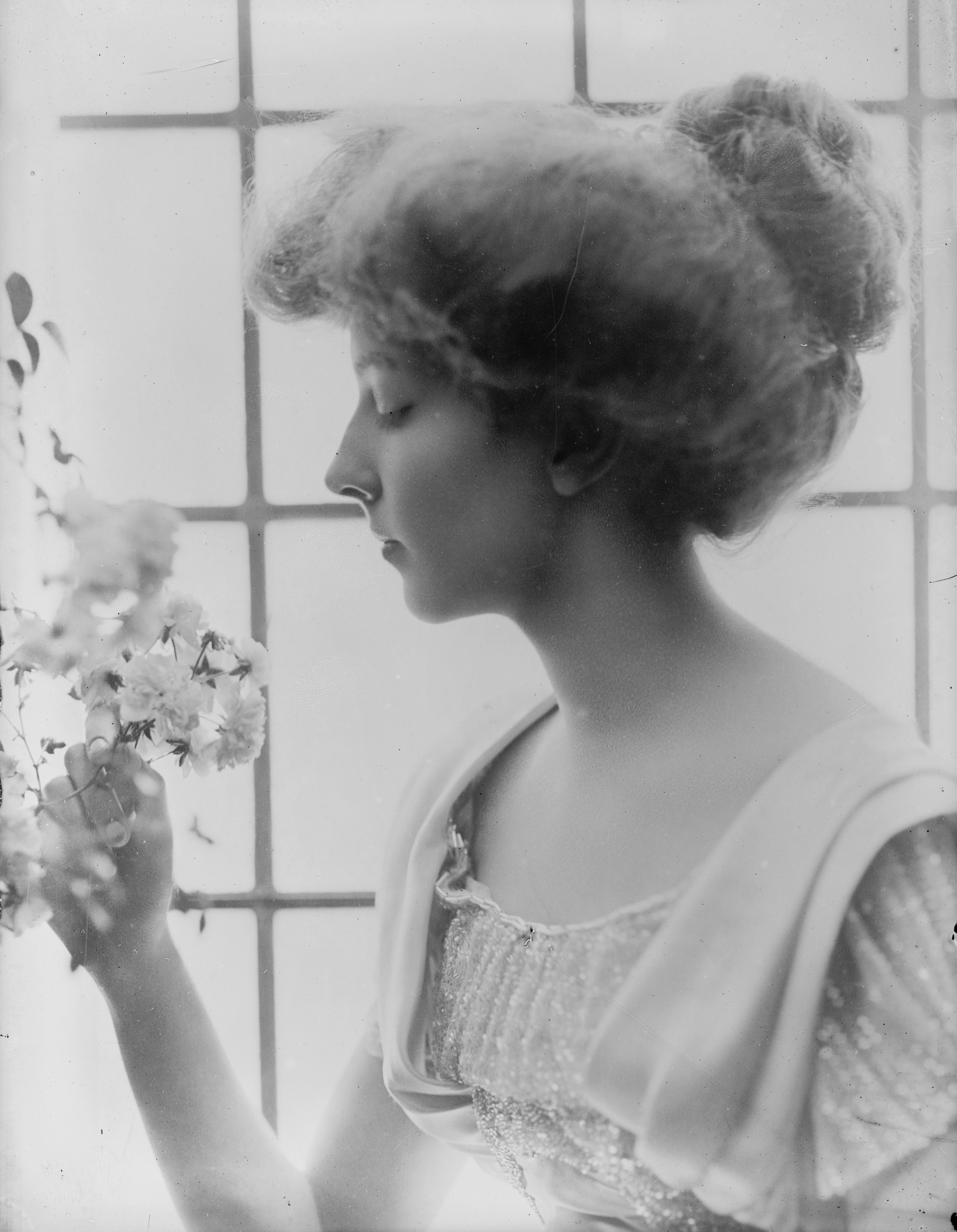
Anita de Braganza

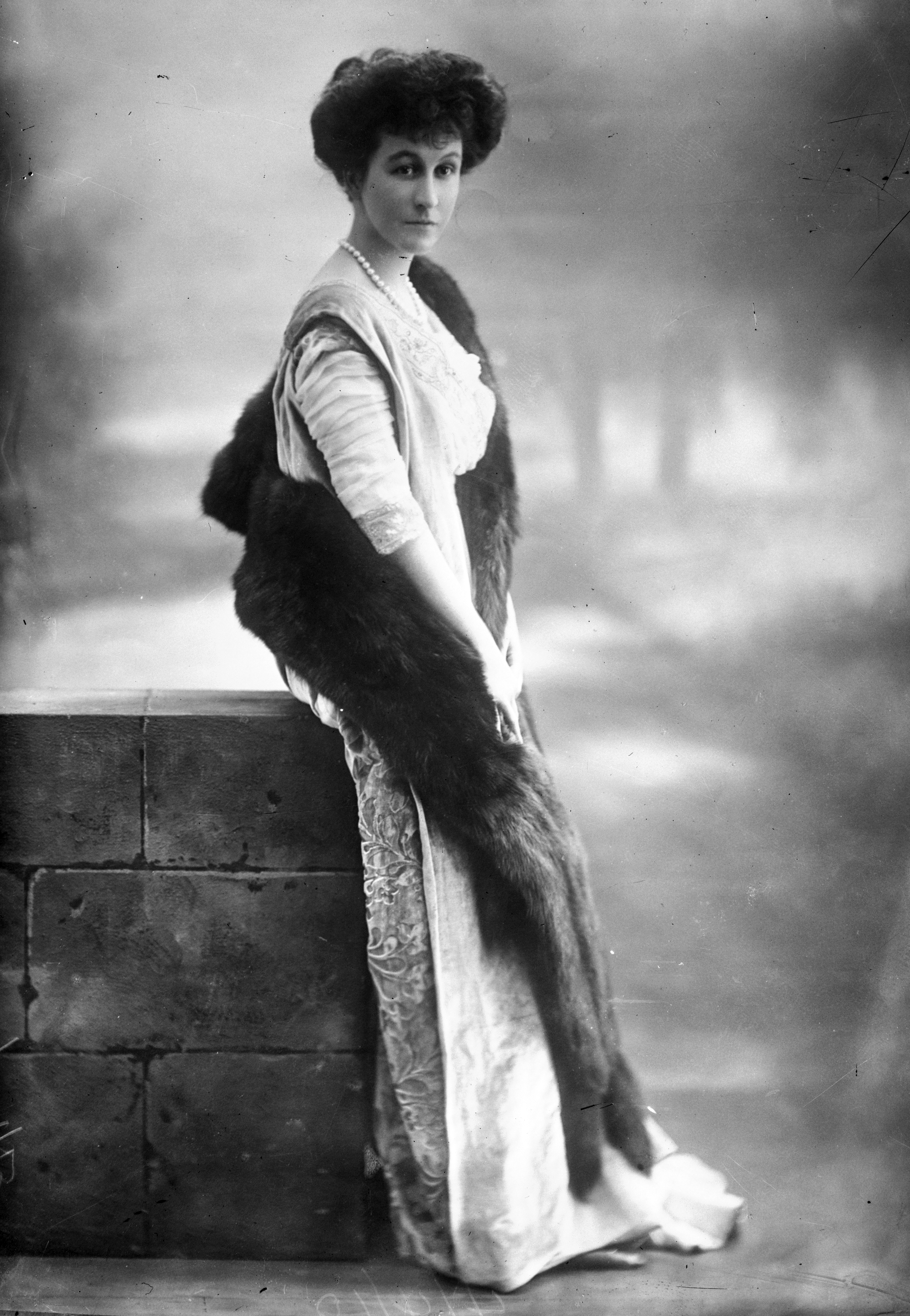
Mary Goelet

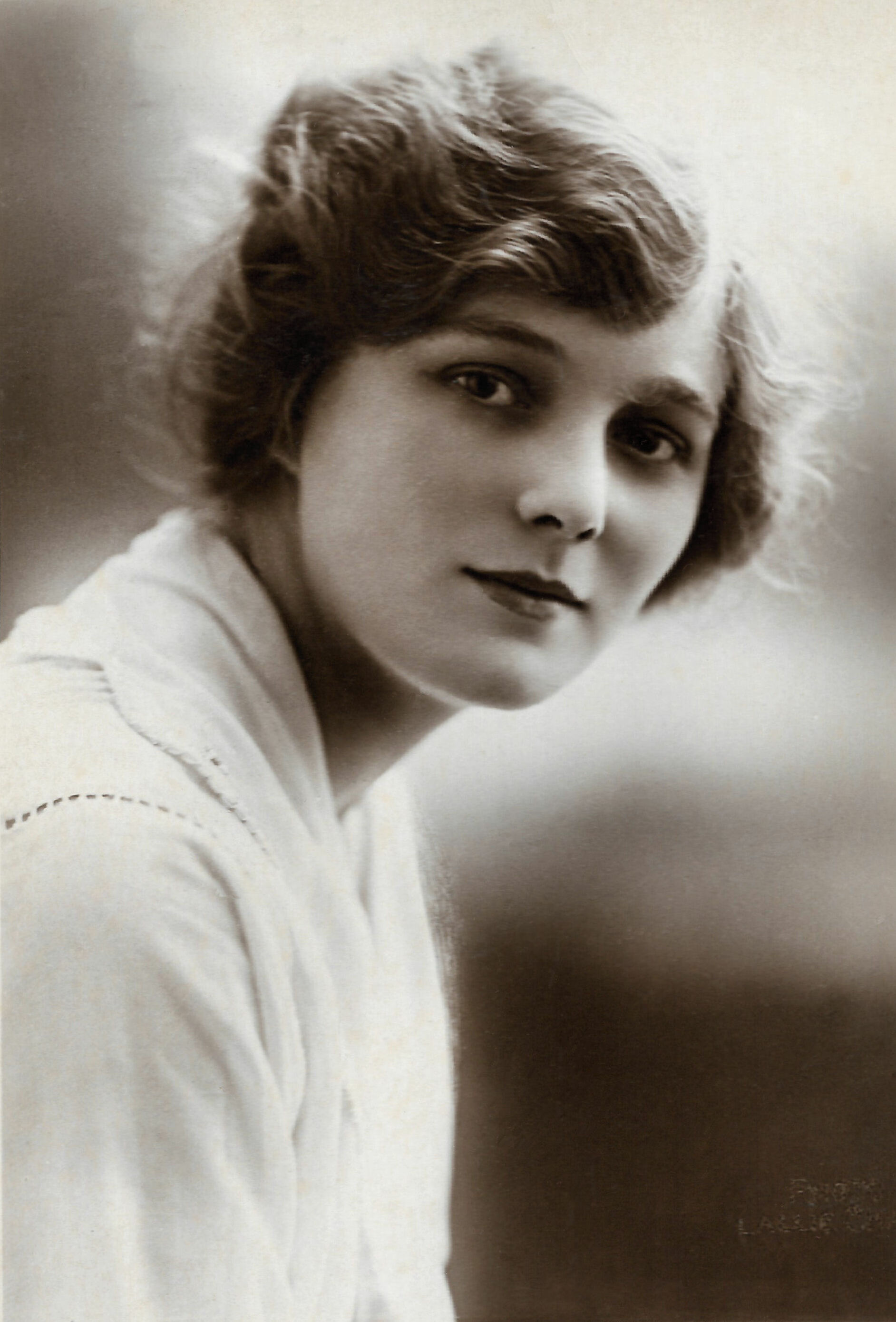
Chrissie White

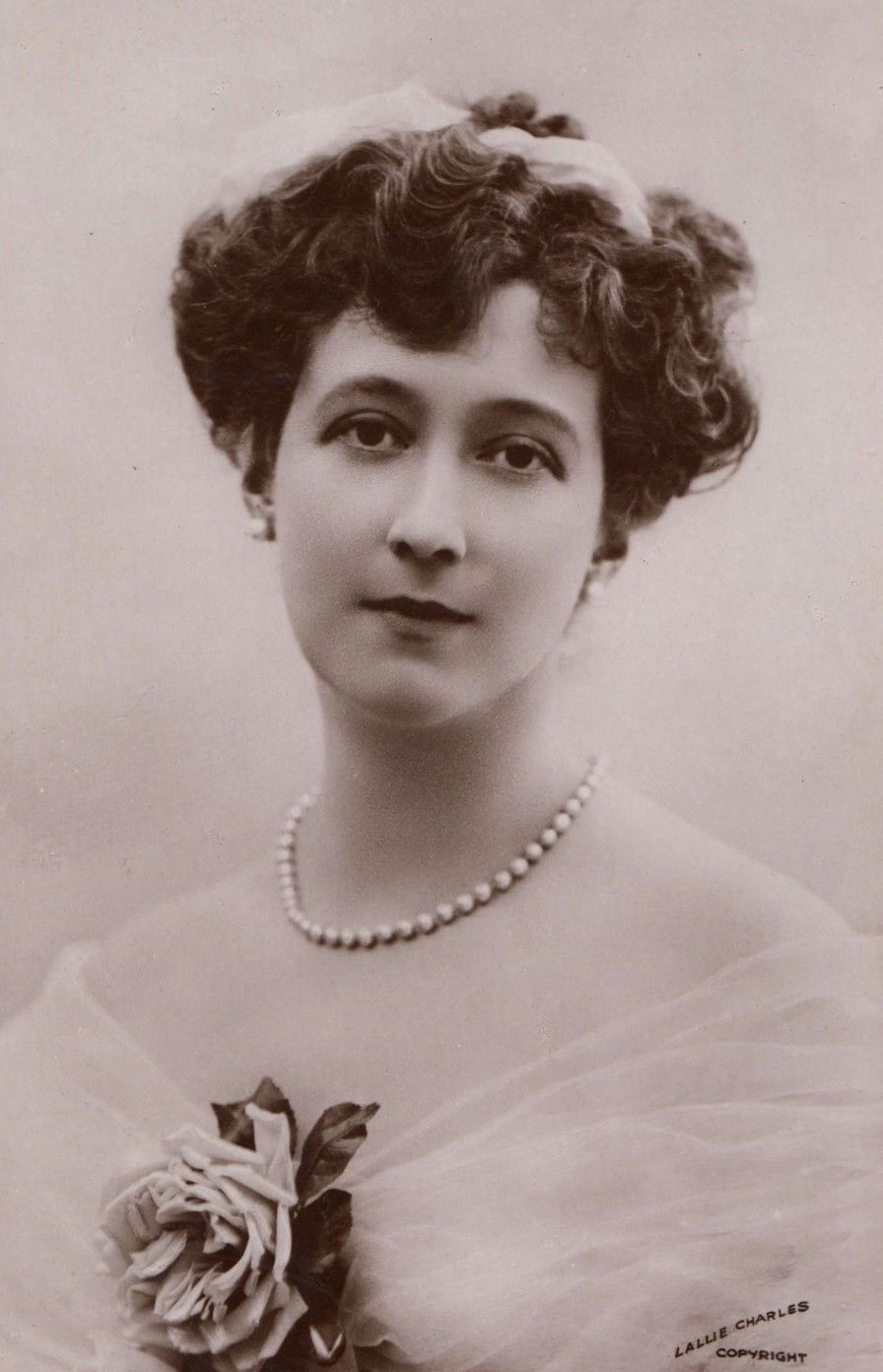
Ellis Jeffreys

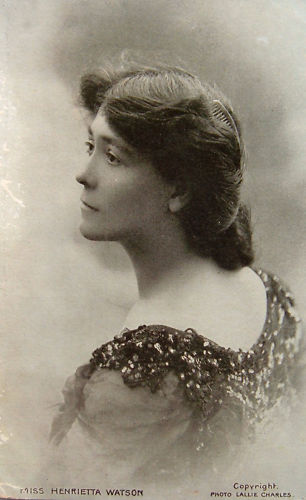
Henrietta Watson

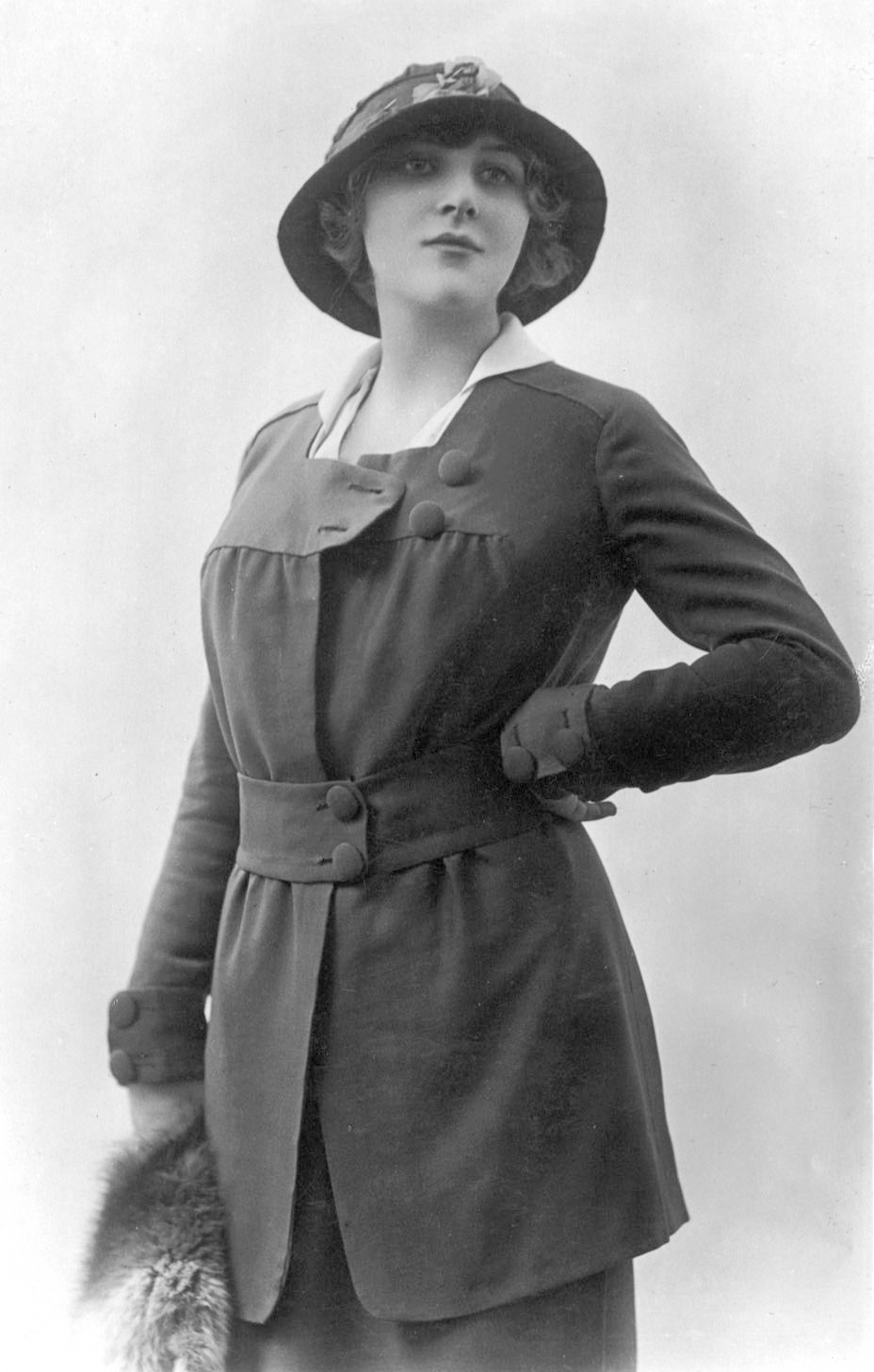
Isobel Elsom

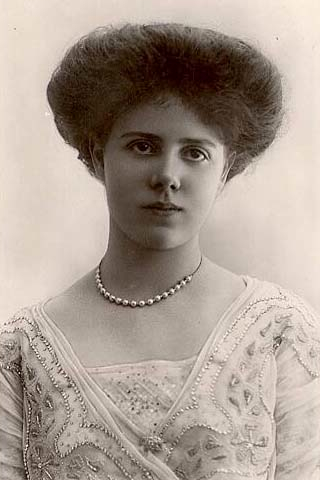
Maud of Fife

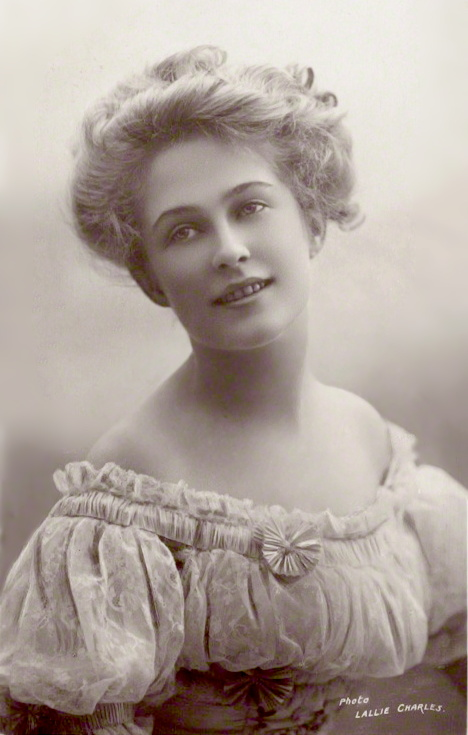
Pauline Chase

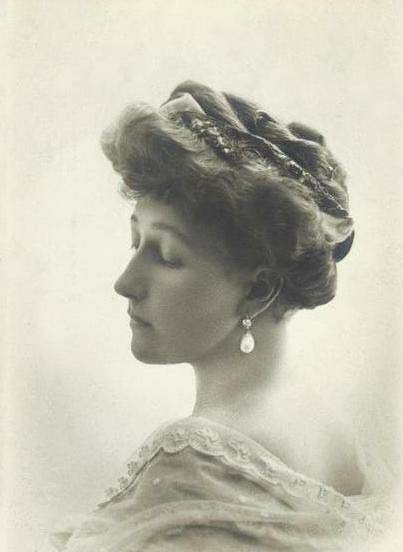
Stephanie of Belgium

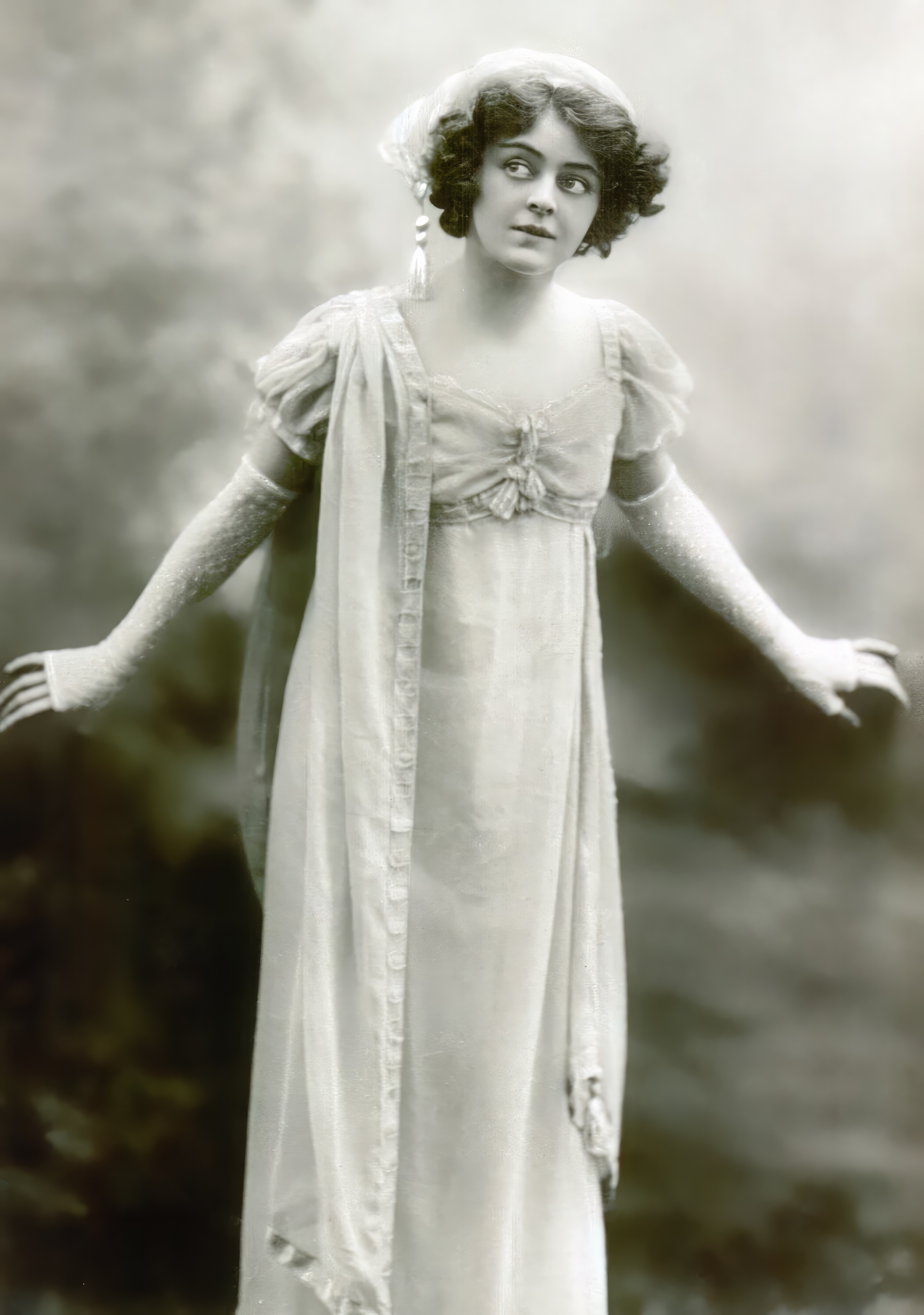
Adrienne Augarde

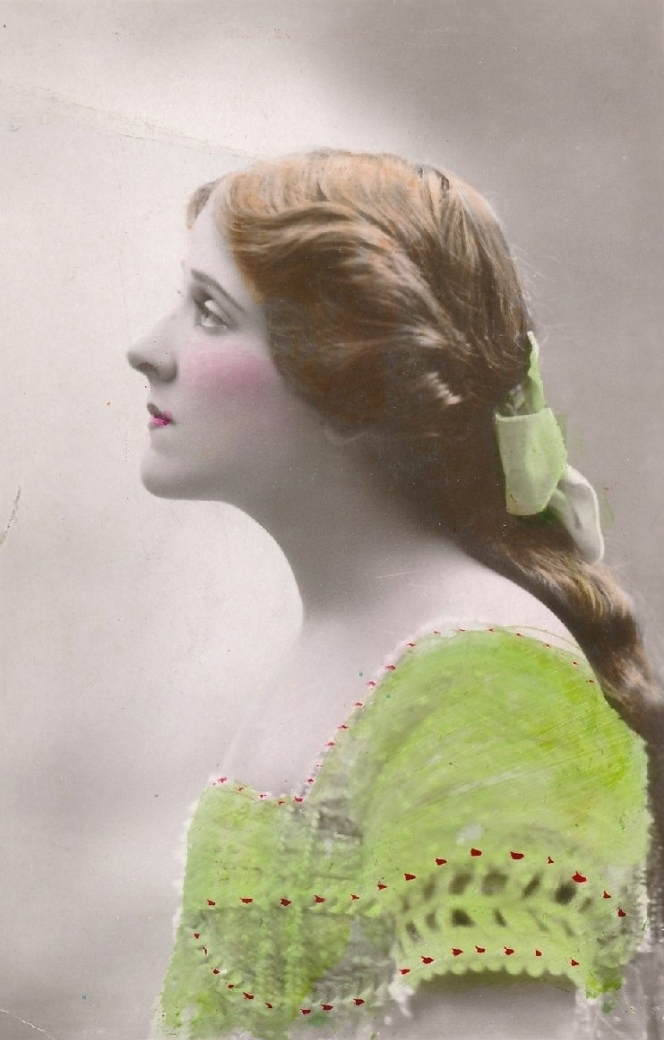
Edna May

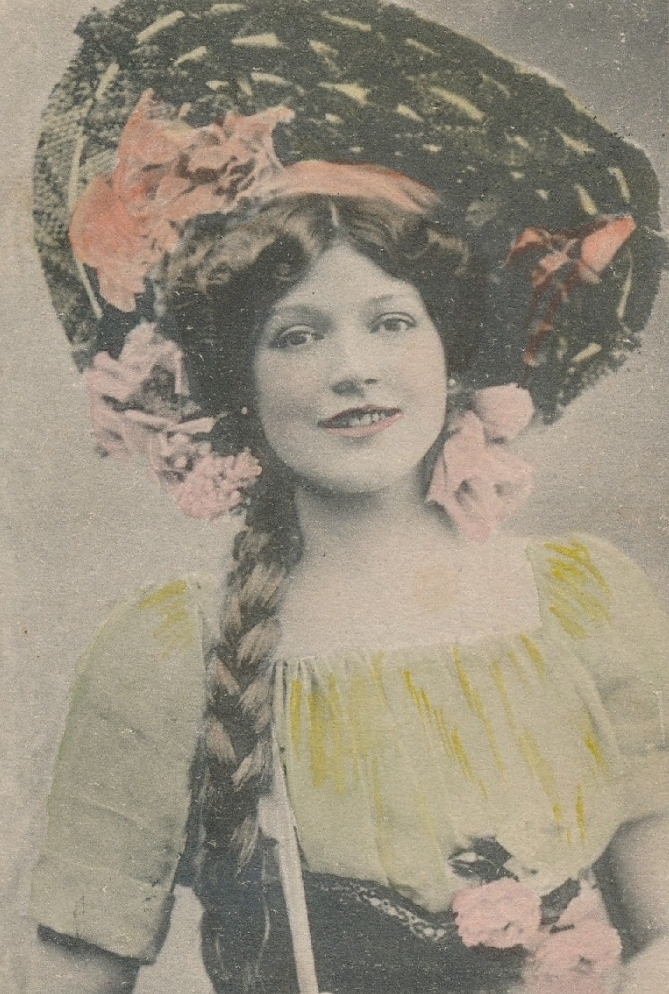
Ruth Vincent

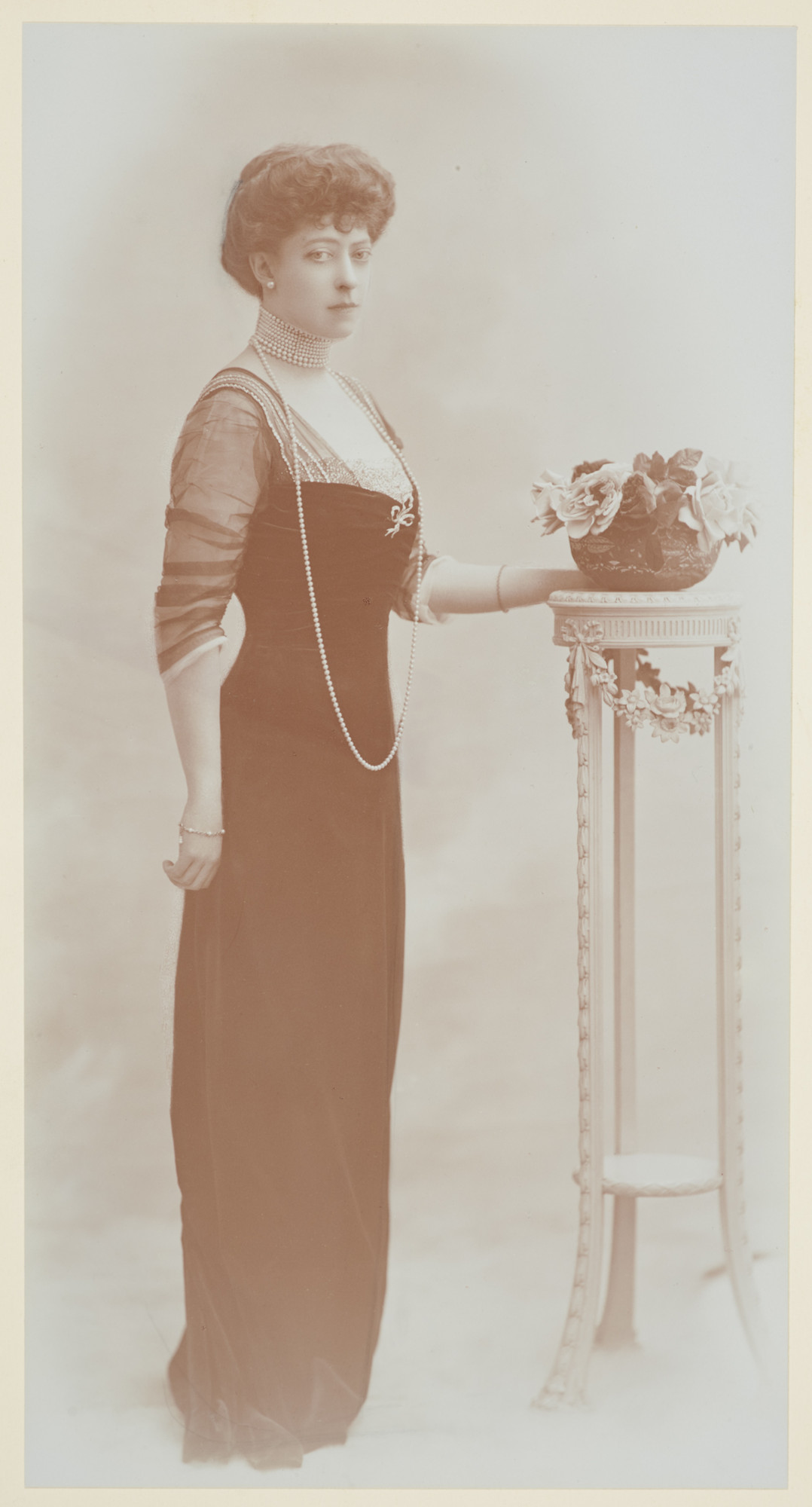
Princess Victoria of the United Kingdom

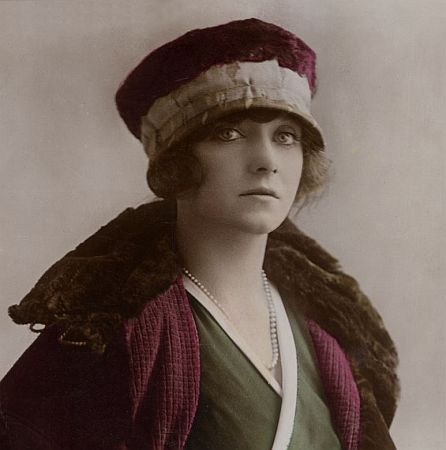
Winifred Barnes

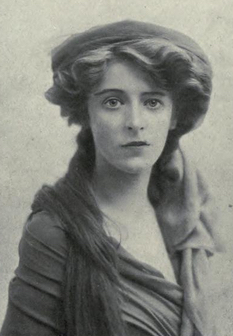
May Leslie Stuart
