= Kate Pragnell =

English photographer (1853–1905)

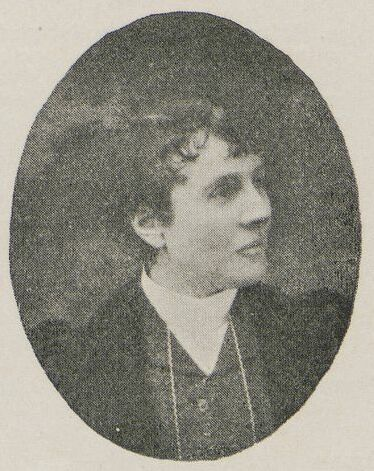
- Kate Pragnell as she appeared in a Portrait album of attendees of the 1899 International Congress of Women.
- Born: 24 February 1853; Newport, Isle of Wight, England
- Died: 19 November 1905 (aged 52); Kensington, London, England

Kate Pragnell (24 February 1853 – 19 November 1905) was an English portrait photographer and business owner.

== Early life ==
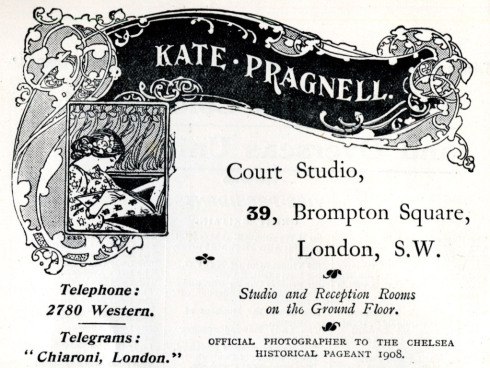
Posthumous business card for Kate Pragnell's business

Kate Pragnell was born on 24 February 1853 at High Street, Newport, Isle of Wight, England.

In 1862 her family moved to Bristol where she later studied at the Bristol School of Art.

== Career ==
In 1890 she went into partnership with photographer William Friese-Greene at 162 Sloane Street, Chelsea, London.

In 1891, she was living at 13 Bath Road, Chiswick, together with artist Emily Bird. She established her own studios at 164 Sloane Street, Chelsea, from 1893 to 1900.

In 1901, she moved to 39 Brompton Square, Kensington, where she also had a studio which she ran with her friend and partner Alice Stewart.

Pragnell died on 19 November 1905 at 39 Brompton Square, from a thyroid neoplasm. She bequeathed her business to Alice Stewart.

Stewart continued the business at Brompton Square until 1911 and then at 16 Albemarle Street, Westminster, from 1911 to 1915.

The continuation of the business under the name 'Kate Pragnell' has led to misattribution of the work of the business to Kate Pragnell personally, e.g. the commission to photograph the Chelsea Historical Pageant, held in the Old Ranelagh Gardens, Royal Hospital.

She was inspired by Alice Hughes; other pioneer women photographers of her time are: Christina Broom, Lallie Charles, Rita Martin and Lizzie Caswall Smith. Unlike Hughes, Pragnell also photographed men, something unusual at the time for a female photographer. Some of her subjects: Punch cartoonist Linley Sambourne; General Sir Beauvoir de Lisle; the wedding portrait of Mrs Lionel Portman on the cover of Country Life on 11 November 1905.

Her work appeared in Bystander, Black and White, Cassell's, Woman at Home and Hearth and Home; Pragnell was basically the main photographer of Hearth and Home.

Pragnell employed only women and sought to encourage training opportunities to enable women to establish their own photographic businesses.

== Legacy ==
Pragnell's work is held in the permanent collection of the National Portrait Gallery, London and in the Hyman Collection, the private collection of Claire and James Hyman.
