= Deadman's: An Australian Story =

1898 novel by Mary Gaunt

Deadman's : An Australian Story
- Author: Mary Gaunt
- Language: English
- Genre: Fiction
- Publisher: Methuen, London
- Publication date: 1898
- Publication place: Australia
- Media type: Print
- Pages: 304 pp
- Preceded by: Kirkham's Find
- Followed by: Mistress Betty Carew

Deadman's : An Australian Story (1898) is a novel by Australian writer Mary Gaunt.

== Story outline ==
Jocelyn Ruthven is the goldfields commissioner of "Deadman's Creek". Following dubious advice he enters into a disastrous marriage with a young woman but later meets the right one. The novel details the attempts by all parties to extricate themselves from unwanted relationships and enter into others.

== Critical reception ==
A reviewer in The Evening News found a number of faults with the book: "Mary Gaunt is well known in the literary world as a clever Victorian authoress; but Deadman's does not quite sustain her reputation...The story lacks a certain amount of spirit in it. It deals with rough life in a rough country; with people at their best and at their worst; and, somehow, the style is too smooth for the subject. The situations strike you as forced, and you have an uncomfortable idea of knowing before-hand what is coming. The author has done better work, and can do better work."

== See also ==
- Full text of the novel from Project Gutenberg Australia
- 1898 in Australian literature
