= Crown of India =

Crown of India may refer to:

- The Monarchy of India between 1876 and 1947, styled as the Emperor of India
- The Imperial Crown of India, the crown used by the emperors of India between 1911 and 1947
- The Crown of India, a masque organised to celebrate the arrival of King George V and Queen Mary to India for their coronation as the Emperor and Empress of India
