= Portrait of Mary of Teck =

Painting by Edward Hughes

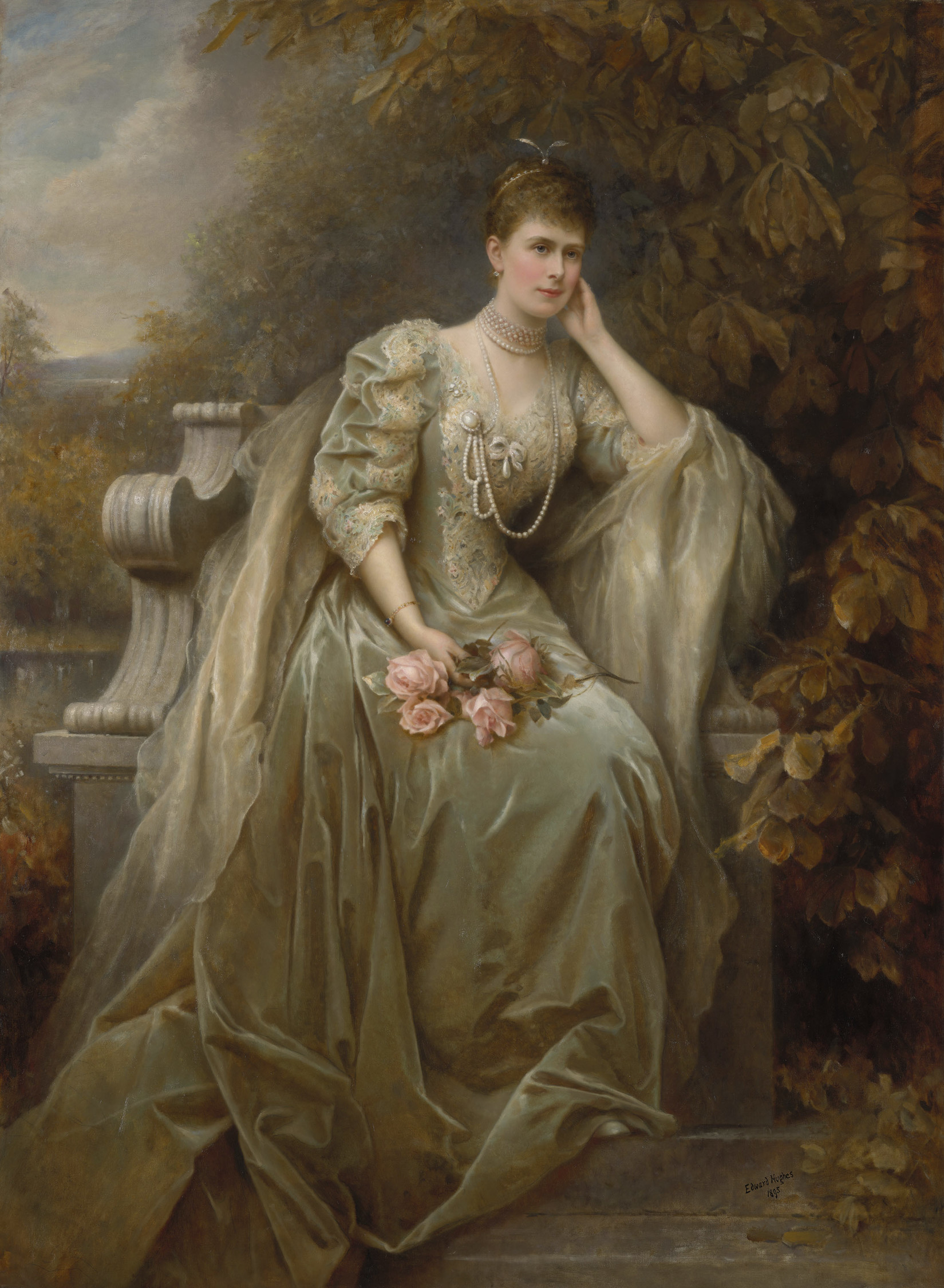
- Artist: Edward Hughes
- Year: 1895
- Type: Oil on canvas, portrait painting
- Dimensions: 188 cm × 139.7 cm (74 in × 55.0 in)
- Location: Buckingham Palace, London

Portrait of Mary of Teck is an 1895 portrait painting by the British artist Edward Hughes. This was Hughes's first royal commission. The portrait depicts Mary of Teck, when Duchess of York, who commissioned the portrait "as a surprise for the family and the sittings were arranged privately". She took part in three sittings between May and July 1895. The portrait was exhibited at Agnew's before being moved to the vestibule at Buckingham Palace. As a result of satisfaction with the artist's work, Hughes was commissioned again in 1899 by the Duke and Duchess of York to produce three portraits of their children, Edward, Albert, and Mary.
