= May Leslie Stuart =

English actress (1886–1956)

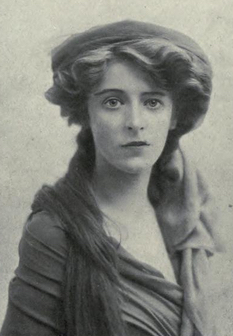
- May Leslie Stuart, photographed by Lallie Charles (c. 1910)
- Born: Mary Catherine Barrett; January 1887; Salford, Lancashire, England
- Died: 20 June 1956 (aged 69); Richmond, London, England
- Occupation(s): Actress, singer
- Spouses: Cecil Cameron (m. 1911; div. 1916) James Mayhew Balls (m. 1917)
- Children: Four

May Leslie Stuart (born Mary Catherine Barrett, January 1887 – 20 June 1956) was an English actress and singer in operetta and Edwardian musical comedy from 1909 to 1915. She also sang on the music hall circuit, performing with her father, the composer Leslie Stuart.

== Early life ==
Stuart was born in Salford, Lancashire (now in Greater Manchester), the elder daughter of the composer Leslie Stuart (born Thomas Augustine Barrett) and his wife, Katherine Mary, née Fox. (Note: Her younger sister Constance ("Lola") married an American banker and, while living in Maine, taught a young George H. W. Bush to play tennis.) Her father's song "Sweetheart May" was written about Stuart when she was a girl.

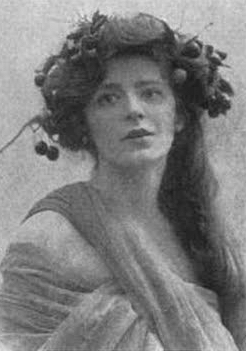
Stuart, photographed by Lallie Charles, from a 1906 publication

== Career ==
Stuart acted and sang on the London stage, with roles in Pinkie and the Fairies (as "Beauty", 1909), Sunlight and Shadow (1910), The Slim Princess (1910), The Count of Luxembourg (1911), The Hope (1911), The Crown of India (as "Delhi", 1912), (Note: This was a masque, with music by Edward Elgar, marking the visit of King George V and Queen Mary to India, for their coronation as Emperor and Empress of India.) an adaptation of Get-Rich-Quick Wallingford (1913), The Girl Next Door (1915), Florodora (as "Lady Holyrood" in the 1915 revival) and The Case of Lady Camber (title role, 1915). A reviewer mentioned her "brilliant" acting in creating the role of Lady Camber as a highlight of the last work.

Stuart appeared in one British silent film, The Second Mrs. Tanqueray (1916), in the role of Lady Orreyd. She appeared on the music hall stage and made some recordings as a singer in 1915, in both settings accompanied by her father on piano, and singing his songs.

In 1910 she was the subject of a photograph in Lallie Charles's exhibit, "Five Hundred Fair Women". After her father's death, she formed and conducted a small touring orchestra to present his works. Her obituaries in Variety and The Stage record that she and her husband were involved in theatrical production after her father's death. Later in life she wrote radio scripts and was an on-air presenter for the BBC.

== Personal life ==
In 1911 she married a fellow actor, Cecil Cameron, son of the actress Violet Cameron. They divorced in 1916. She married again in 1917, to James Mayhew Balls, an auctioneer. There was some opposition from Stuart's family to the second marriage on the grounds that Balls was five years her junior and a Protestant, whereas the Stuarts were staunchly Roman Catholic. Stuart's pregnancy with the first of the couple's four children effectively ended the family's opposition. (Note: In 1923 the family, which by then included four children, changed its surname name by deed poll from Balls to Mayhew.) In her last years Stuart lived in Twickenham, a London suburb; she died in 1956, in Richmond, London.

== Sources ==
- Lamb, Andrew (2002). Leslie Stuart: The Man Who Composed Florodora. London: Routledge. ISBN 0-415-93747-7.
