= Rosa Campbell Praed =

Australian author (1851–1935)

Rosa Praed
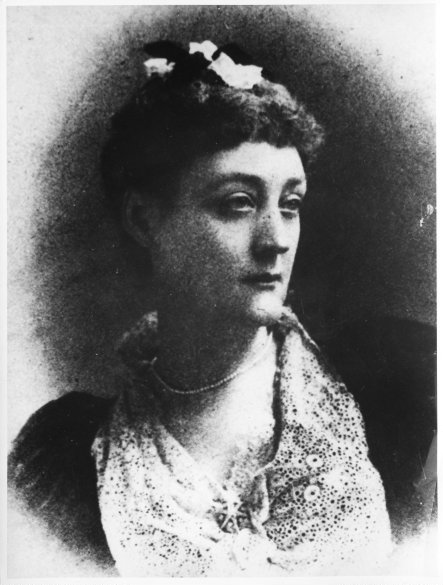
- Born: Rosa Caroline Murray-Prior; 27 March 1851; Bromelton, Queensland, Australia
- Died: 10 April 1935 (aged 84); Torquay, Devon, England
- Resting place: Kensal Green Cemetery
- Spouse: Arthur Campbell Bulkley Praed (m. 1872; sep. 1897)
- Children: 4

Rosa Campbell Praed (née Murray-Prior; 27 March 1851 – 10 April 1935) was an Australian author. Born in Bromelton, Queensland, in 1851, she grew up on properties across rural Queensland. She married in 1872 and spent two unhappy years on a cattle station on Curtis Island before moving to England with her husband. She became a successful novelist and published more than 45 books over the course of her career. After separating from her husband in the late 1890s, she lived for more than thirty years with a medium named Nancy Harward and developed an interest in reincarnation, spiritualism, and the occult. Praed has been described by the scholar Elizabeth Webby as "the first Australian-born novelist to achieve a significant international reputation".

About half of Praed's novels are set in Australia or have an Australian connection. She wrote romances that contrasted Australian and English culture and values, as well as exploring the treatment of Aboriginal Australians and the women's experiences in the Australian bush. Praed's writing often featured unhappy wives and reluctant brides, and explored the mistreatment of women in marriage. Her writing was at times controversial due to her ambivalent portrayal of marriage and her depictions of taboo topics including spousal abuse, marital rape, and divorce. Her later work drew on her interest in theosophy and reincarnation, and often featured supernatural themes.

== Biography ==
=== Early life ===
Rosa Praed was born Rosa Caroline Murray-Prior on 27 March 1851 in Bromelton, Queensland. She was the third child of the pastoralist Thomas Lodge Murray-Prior and his wife Matilda (née Harpur). The family moved to Naraigin, a station in central Queensland, when Rosa was five years old. After eleven settlers were killed nearby by Indigenous Australians in the Hornet Bank massacre, her father helped to organise reprisal attacks; they moved away soon after.

Rosa received a limited education and was educated largely by private tutors and by her mother. Her mother encouraged her interest in literature and her writing of poetry and short stories. In 1861 the family moved to Brisbane after Rosa's father became Queensland's postmaster general and a member of the colony's legislative council. In 1864 her father purchased a station named Marroon near the border with New South Wales, after which they split their time between Brisbane and the property. After her mother's death in 1868, Rosa became responsible for the education of her younger siblings.

On 29 October 1872, Rosa married Arthur Campbell Bulkley Praed in Brisbane and moved to his cattle station, Monte Cristo, on Curtis Island. She experienced an unhappy and isolated life on the island, an experience that she would later depict in several of her novels. During her time on Curtis Island she gave birth to her first child, a daughter named Maud (or Matilda) born in 1874. In 1876 Rosa and her husband left for England to start a brewing business; while the trip was intended to be temporary, they ultimately remained in England permanently. By that point Rosa had given birth to a son named Bulkley. They settled in the village of Rushden in Northamptonshire, where Rosa had two more children: Humphrey, born in 1877, and Geoffrey, born in 1879.

=== Writing career ===
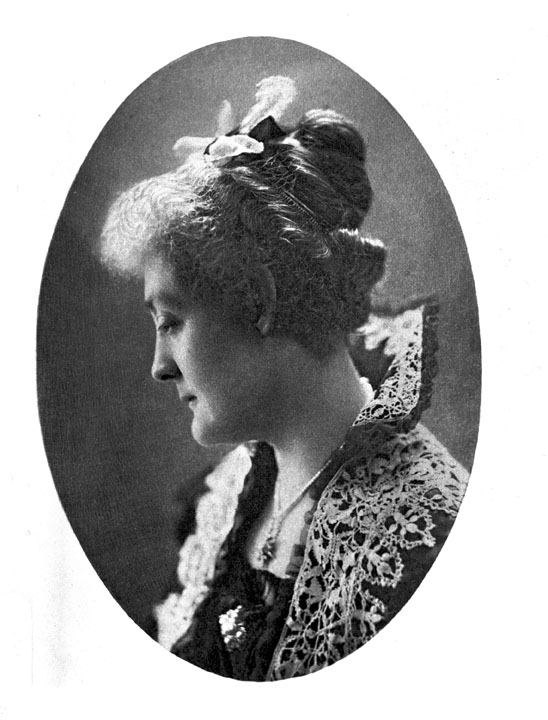
Praed c. 1890

Upon arriving in England, Rosa attempted to find a publisher for her first novel. Frederic Chapman of Chapman & Hall was initially receptive of her manuscript, but eventually advised her to continue working on it for at least six months before resubmitting. She sent the manuscript to Richard Bentley & Son, which also declined to proceed with the work. She rewrote the manuscript and sent it to another publisher at Chapman & Hall, who accepted it. The novel, An Australian Heroine, was published in 1880 under the name R. Murray Prior and received positive reviews. The next year Praed published what is regarded as one of her best works, a three-volume novel titled Policy and Passion: A Novel of Australian Life. The manuscript initially featured open depictions of sexual relationships, which Praed eventually agreed to remove at the urging of her publisher. The novel was positively reviewed in England, although Australian reviewers were more critical of its frank acknowledgement of Australia's convict past.

In 1882 Rosa published her third novel Nadine, which she had written in just six weeks based on the life of the Russian writer Olga Novikoff. The book was a commercial success despite receiving more negative reviews, and caused her to become a literary celebrity. That year she moved to London and began a collaboration with the Irish politician Justin McCarthy; they would eventually co-author four books between 1886 and 1889. In 1912 Praed published a collection of her letters from McCarthy under the title Our Book of Memories. Rosa also developed an interest in spiritualism and the occult and was introduced to the theosophical movement by Henry Olcott and Helena Blavatsky.

She wrote two more novels soon after moving to London: Moloch: A Story of Sacrifice (1883) and Zéro: A Story of Monte Carlo (1884). In 1885 she published three new books: an autobiography titled Australian Life, Black and White, a romance novel titled The Head Station: A Novel of Australian Life, and a novel about occultism and theosophy titled Affinities: A Romance of To-day. She followed this with another successful novel about the occult titled The Brother of the Shadow: A Mystery of To-day in 1886. The following year she published The Bond of Wedlock: A Tale of London Life, in which she examined the mistreatment of women in marriage, as well as the problems of marital rape and domestic abuse. The novel was adapted into a play titled Ariane the following year. The play ran on the West End in 1888 and saw about 100 performances over its four-month run. The novel and play both attracted criticism and were labelled "immoral" and "disgusting", but were a commercial success. A parody of the play titled "Airey" Annie, A Travestie of Mrs C. Praed's play of "Ariane" was staged at a nearby theatre during its run.

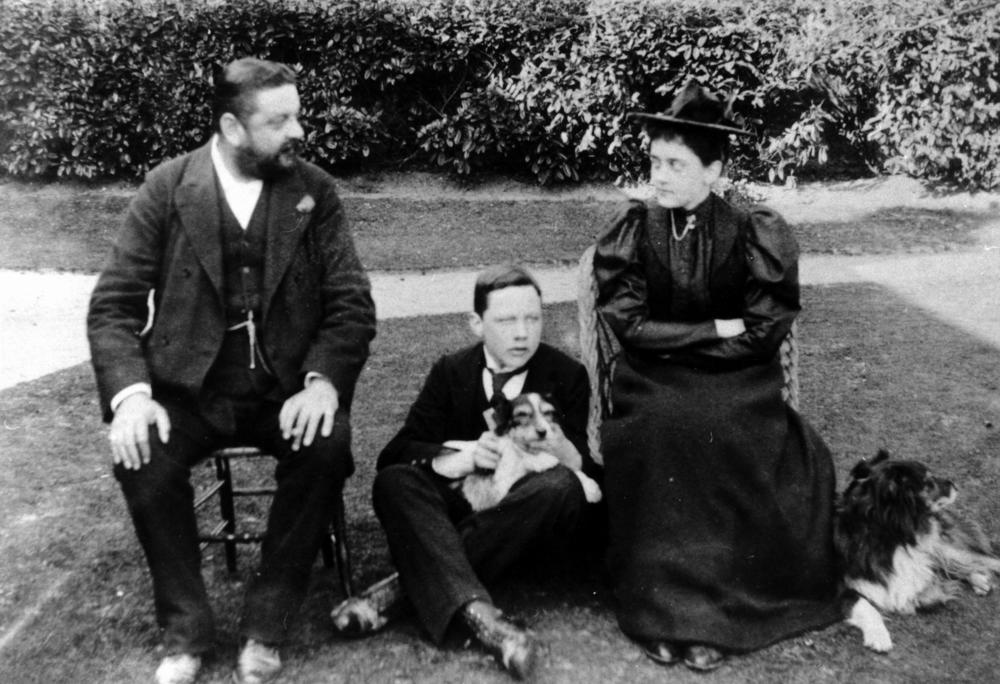
Rosa Praed in 1894 with her husband Campbell and son Humphrey

Praed wrote two more novels about Australia during this period, titled Miss Jacobsen's Chance and The Romance of a Station. She followed these with The Soul of Countess Adrian (1891), The Romance of a Châlet: A Story (1892), and December Roses: A Novel (1892). In December Roses she explored the Catholic faith and the necessity of legal divorce. That year Rosa and her husband moved from London to the Hertfordshire countryside due to financial pressures. There, she wrote one of her most successful novels, Outlaw and Lawmaker (1893), and two more novels: Christina Chard (1893), and Mrs Tregaskiss (1895). Between 1894 and 1895, Rosa made her sole return visit to Australia. She drew on what she had witnessed during her visit in her next novel, Nùlma (1897), and also wrote articles and a novel titled Madame Izàn: A Tourist Story (1899) based on her time in Hong Kong, Sri Lanka and Japan during her journey.

After she returned from Australia, Rosa and her husband became estranged. They separated in 1897, after which Rosa began living with a medium named Nancy Harward. In 1901 she wrote a novel about reincarnation titled As a Watch in the Night about a woman who had lived a previous incarnation in Ancient Rome. Her writing began to be more heavily influenced by occult and supernatural themes. Praed believed that Harward was a reincarnated Roman slave girl named Nyria. She wrote about Harward's past life, which they had uncovered through séances, in her historical novel Nyria (1904). Praed was also convinced that she was the reincarnation of an Ancient Roman woman named Valeria who had treated Nyria poorly, and that the personal tragedies she had endured in her life were punishment for her actions as Valeria.

=== Later life ===
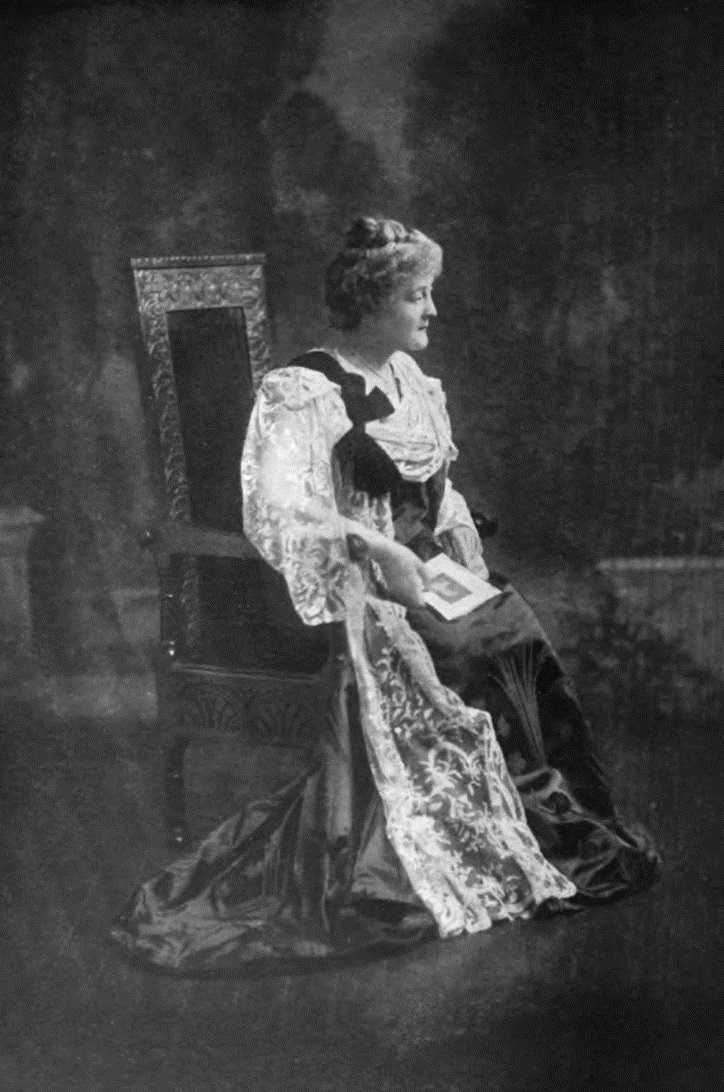
Praed, photographed by Kate Pragnell

Between 1900 and 1914, Praed produced a large volume of novels and short story collections in an attempt to support herself financially. Her estranged husband died in 1901, and her daughter Maud was confined to an asylum after beginning to experience symptoms of mental illness. Praed's writing became rushed and received much more negative reviews. Following the First World War, Praed and Harward began to move between guest houses and hotels across France and England. Rosa found writing more difficult and spent many years attempting to work on a supernatural novel that she had begun writing in 1911. She did not publish any further writing between the publication of her final novel Sister Sorrow in 1916 and 1931. Harward died in London in 1927. Praed published her final work in 1931, The Soul of Nyria: The Memory of a Past Life in Ancient Rome, based on Harward's recounting of her past life during their séances.

Rosa Praed died on 10 April 1935 in Torquay. By the time of her death, her three sons had already died: Humphrey had died in a car crash in California in 1904, Geoffrey had been gored by a rhinoceros in a hunting accident in Rhodesia in 1926, and Bulkley had committed suicide in 1931 while suffering from terminal cancer. Her daughter, who was born deaf, was institutionalised in a mental asylum, where she would remain for the remainder of her life. Rosa was buried at Kensal Green Cemetery alongside Harward.

== Writing ==
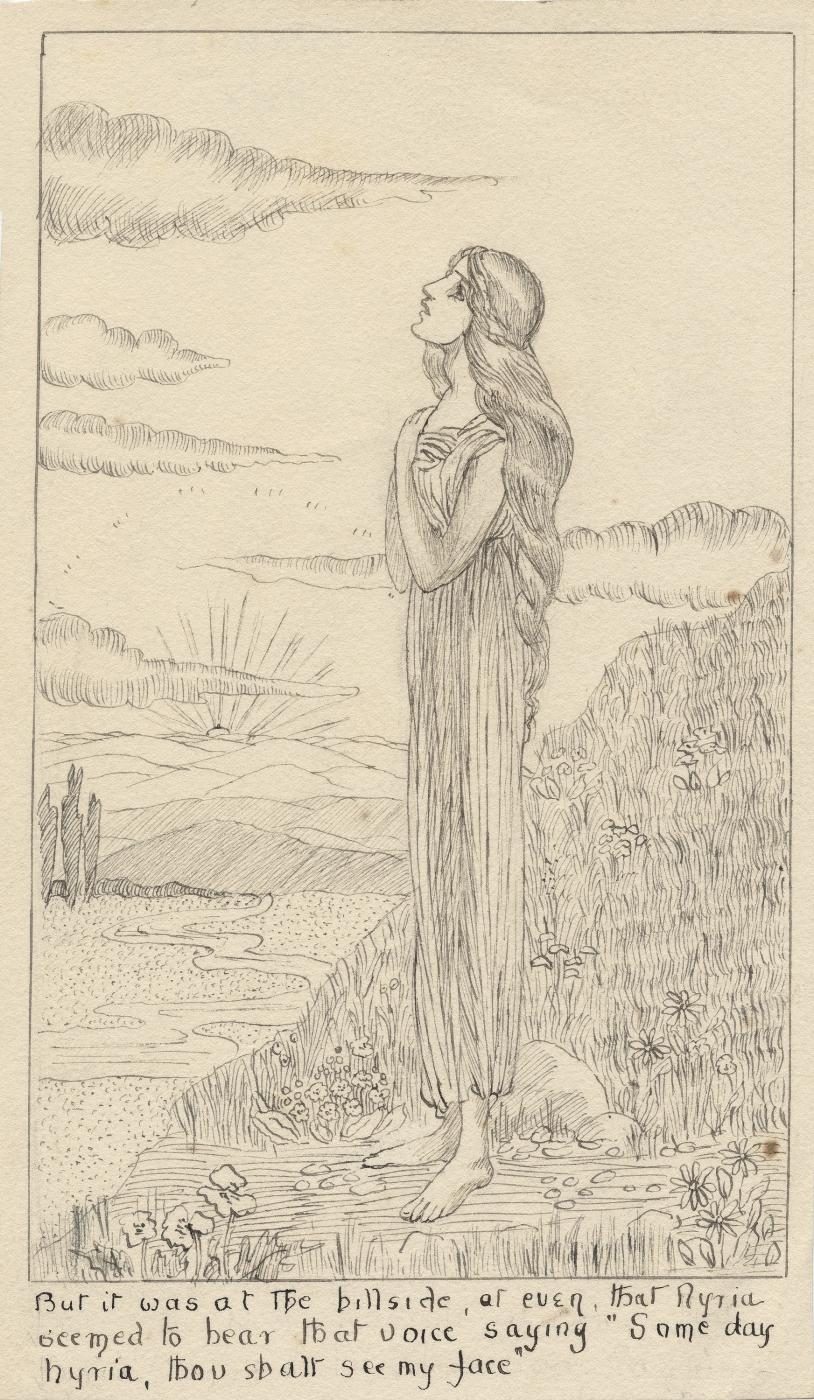
Sketch of a woman from Praed's notebooks

Rosa Praed wrote more than 45 books, which she published under the name "Mrs Campbell Praed". Among these were about 41 novels, 3 short story collections, and 4 non-fiction works. She also wrote a play, Ariane, based on her 1887 novel The Bond of Wedlock.

Much of Praed's writing explores Australian life, contrasting the "frank, vital, raw" colony with the "alluring, sophistical but fundamentally corrupt" European continent. About half of her books have an Australian setting or Australian characters. Often her stories depict a young Australian woman who is seduced by a "suave though duplicitous Englishman". She wrote various permutations of romances between Australian women and English and Australian men, which she used as a vehicle for commentary on the relative merits of English and Australian values and culture. The scholar Chris Tiffin writes that the Australian characters in Praed's fiction are "culturally unsure" and are often found looking towards England for guidance. He concludes that Praed's writing exhibited her appreciation for Australia alongside her belief in the preservation of English traditions.

Praed's writing drew on her experiences as a child in Australia, which she used to create narratives of Australian life that would interest an English audience. Some of her books feature Aboriginal characters; the scholar Dale Spender writes that while her views and portrayals of Aboriginal Australians often appear racist to a modern audience, her writing represented a radical defence of Aboriginal rights within the context of her era. Her writing also criticised the cruelty and snobbery of Australia's squattocracy, and the isolation and hardships that women faced in the Australian bush.

Praed's novels often depict courtship and marriage, and explore the unhappiness of women trapped in unfulfilling marriages. Her writing idealises "true love" and frequently depicts the failures of marriage to live up to women's expectations. Many of her novels are psychological studies of unhappy women, including wives trapped in unhappy marriages, and young women who are reluctant to marry. Despite being advised by several of her publishers to "tone down" her writing, Praed often explored controversial and feminist themes in her writing, including sexual double standards, spousal abuse, and divorce.

== Legacy and reception ==
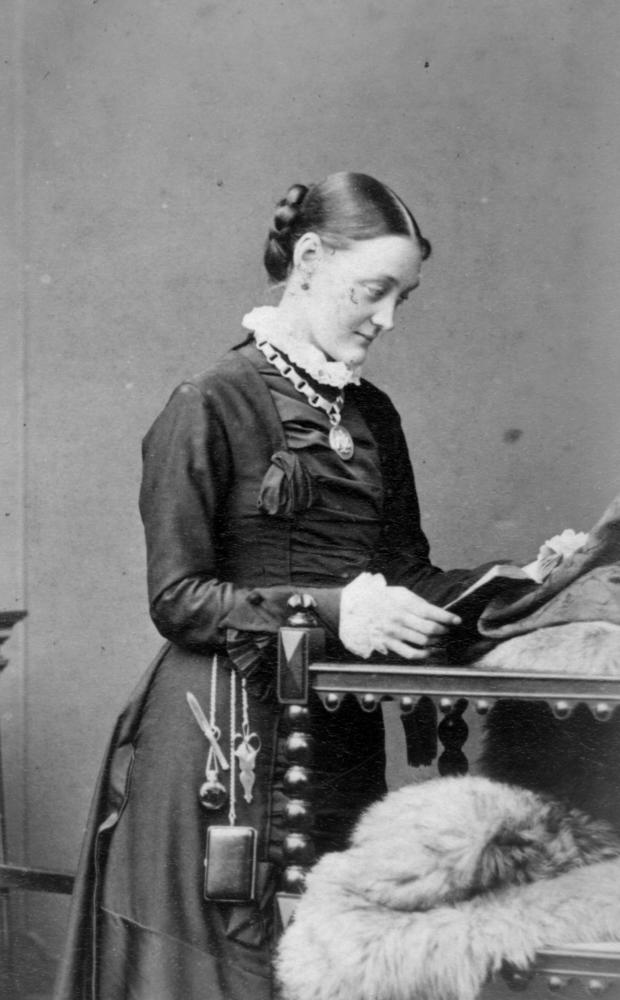
Praed, pictured 1878

Praed was a popular writer during her lifetime, and has been described as the first Australian author to achieve international literary fame. The scholar Elizabeth Webby describes Praed as "the first Australian-born novelist to achieve a significant international reputation", while the historian E. Morris Miller labelled Praed "the most distinguished woman novelist of the pre-federation era".

Praed was often trivialised and dismissed in the decades following her death as the author of superficial and formulaic women's romance fiction. Spender writes that she has been dismissed by critics as "a middle-class woman writer of polite Anglo-Australian fiction"; he describes this perception as "perplexing" given the facts of her life and the contents of her writing. From around the 1980s onwards, there was a resurgence of interest in Praed's writing from feminist and postcolonial literary critics.

== Selected works ==
All works listed are provided by Beilby & Hadgraft (1979):

=== Novels ===
- An Australian Heroine (1880)
- Policy and Passion (1881)
- Nadine: The Study of a Woman (1882)
- Moloch: A Story of Sacrifice (1883)
- Zéro: A Story of Monte Carlo (1884)
- The Head Station (1885)
- Affinities: A Romance of To-day (1885)
- Miss Jacobsen's Chance (1886)
- The Right Honorable (1886)
- The Brother of the Shadow (1886)
- The Bond of Wedlock (1887)
- The Ladies' Gallery (1888)
- The Rebel Rose (1888)
- The Soul of Countess Adrian (1888)
- The Romance of a Station (1889)
- The Romance of a Chalet (1892)
- December Roses (1892)
- Christina Chard (1893)
- Outlaw and Lawmaker (1893)
- Mrs Tregaskiss (1895)
- Nùlma (1897)
- The Scourge-Stick (1898)
- Madame Izan (1899)
- As a Watch in the Night (1901)
- The Insane Root (1902)
- The Other Mrs Jacobs (1903)
- Fugitive Anne, A Romance of the Australian Bush (1903)
- The Ghost (1903)
- Some Loves and a Life (1904)
- Nyria (1904)
- The Maid of the River (1905)
- The Lost Earl of Ellan (1906)
- By Their Fruits (1908)
- The Romance of Mademoiselle Aïssé (1910)
- Opal Fire (1910)
- The Body of His Desire (1912)
- The Mystery Woman (1913)
- Lady Bridget in the Never-Never Land (1915)
- Sister Sorrow (1916)

=== Short story collections ===
- Dwellers by the River (1902)
- The Luck of the Leura (1907)
- Stubble Before the Wind (1908)
- A Summer Wreath (1909)

=== Poetry collection ===
- Seven Christmas Eves (1899)

=== Autobiography ===
- Australian Life: Black and White (1885)
- My Australian Girlhood (1902)
- Soul of Nyria (1931)

=== Correspondence ===
- Our Book of Memories: Letters of Justin McCarthy to Mrs Campbell Praed (1912)
