= Dave's Sweetheart =

1894 novel by Mary Gaunt

- Author: Mary Gaunt
- Language: English
- Genre: Fiction
- Publisher: Edward Arnold, London
- Publication date: 1894
- Publication place: Australia
- Media type: Print
- Pages: 264pp
- Preceded by: –
- Followed by: Kirkham's Find

Dave's Sweetheart (1894) is a novel by Australian writer Mary Gaunt.

== Story outline ==
The novel is set on the Victorian goldfields of the 1850s and follows the story of Jenny Carter, the willful daughter of a local grog-shop keeper. She is romantically pursued by the local police sergeant, as well as Black Dave, a man who is later thought to be the chief suspect in the murder of a German gardener.

== Critical reception ==
A reviewer in The Argus was very impressed with the book: "It is not often that the first novel of a young writer exhibits so much strength of purpose and execution as the Dave's Sweetheart of Miss Mary Gaunt. It is equally strong in character, incident, imagination and narrative. The half-a-dozen personages by whom the action of the drama is carried on are real men and women, and not marionettes who speak the language of the author while he or she is engaged in pulling the strings behind the scenes. They are, for the most part, very common people, with the feelings of their class, and also with their homely, energetic and occasionally coarse and vehement methods of giving them expression... Miss Gaunt has written so good a novel that the rival she will have most cause to fear in her next will be the author of Dave's Sweetheart."

The reviewer in The Weekly Times agreed with that sentiment: "Not heeding the craving of those readers whose taste is far from healthy, Miss Gaunt has had the courage to give to the world a book that is unmistakably clever, interesting, pure and pathetic, without trying to tell the reader on every page that she herself is a clever woman. Indeed, so skilfully is the story told, we almost forget the story has a teller, and accept it as if it had grown."

== See also ==
- Full text of the novel from Project Gutenberg Australia
- 1894 in Australian literature
