= In Strange Company =

Book by Guy Boothby

- Title page for In Strange Company (1900 printing)
- Author: Guy Boothby
- Language: English
- Genre: Fiction
- Publisher: Ward, Lock & Bowden, London
- Publication date: 1894
- Publication place: Australia
- Media type: Print
- Pages: 300pp
- Preceded by: On the Wallaby
- Followed by: A Lost Endeavour

In Strange Company: a story of Chili and the southern seas (1894) is a novel by Australian writer Guy Boothby.

== Story outline ==
Marmaduke Plowden has embezzled 200 thousand pounds from his clients in London and fled the country for Chili. A number of unsavoury characters learn about the theft and set plans in motion to retrieve the money for themselves.

== Critical reception ==
A reviewer in The Telegraph (Brisbane) praised the book for being a good example of its type: "This book will be very welcome to all those who love a straightforward tale without great intricacy of plot, subtle delineation of character, or fine local colour. It is a good example of a class of work growing common enough of late when life in the open air and the stir of conflict are preferred to hysterical, drawing-room emotion and unholy passion. There is not one word of harm in the whole story, but on the contrary, much refreshment for man or boy who is tired of the ceaseless. irritations of city life."

Continuing that approach, a reviewer in The Morning Bulletin (Rockhampton) found some worth in the book: "In Strange Company is a rattling story of adventure, in the course of which the reader is carried from the Isle of Wight to London, thence to the Argentine Republic, from there to Chili, then to Tahiti, Thursday Island; Batavia, and back to London where the tale finishes. Mr. Boothby tells his story vividly and stirringly, and if he fills it with incredible incidents, he does not annoy the reader by fine-spun attempts to give an air of strict truth and literal accuracy to every turn of his narrative. Neither does he weary himself with long descriptions of scenery. The beauty of the southern seas has evidently touched Mr. Boothby closely, and at times he gives a distinct impression of the islands of the Pacific in a few crisp sentences."

== See also ==
- Full text of the novel from University of California Library
- 1894 in Australian literature
