= Camille Clifford =

American-British actress and Gibson Girl model (1885–1971)

- Camille Clifford, the quintessential Gibson Girl.
- Born: Camilla Antoinette Clifford; 29 June 1885; Antwerp, Belgium
- Died: 28 June 1971 (aged 85); England
- Years active: 1902–1906, c. 1915–c. 1918
- Spouses: Hon. Henry Lyndhurst Bruce (m. 1906; died 1914) John Meredyth Jones Evans (m. 1917; died 1957)

Camilla Antoinette Clifford (29 June 1885 – 28 June 1971), known professionally as Camille Clifford, was a Belgian-born stage actress whose short theatrical career was highlighted by her performance as "Miss New York" in the Henry W. Savage production of The Prince of Pilsen, a role in which she impersonated a "Gibson Girl"-like woman. While her towering coiffure and hourglass figure were representative of the Gibson Girl style, she only played the part of a Gibson Girl on the stage, and never actually modeled for any of Charles Dana Gibson's illustrations.

== Early life ==
Clifford was born on 29 June 1885 in Antwerp, Belgium, to Reynold Clifford and Matilda Ottersen. Camille was raised in Sweden, Norway and Boston.

== Career ==
On August 31, 1903, Clifford made her debut as Mazie Manhattan, the New York Girl in "The Song of the Cities," in a new Henry W. Savage production of The Prince of Pilsen at the Tremont Theatre in Boston. The role called for a young woman to walk across the stage in the style and manner of one of Charles Dana Gibson's famous female illustrations. This has led to the misconception that Clifford was a Gibson model, when in fact it is the reverse: she imitated his work on stage, but never posed for the illustrations themselves. In early 1904 the Savage company signed a contract with George Musgrove and Frank McKee for a European tour of The Prince of Pilsen and other repertoire productions, and to make up this touring company, a contest was held to determine which of the many actresses who had played the role of Mazie Manhattan over the years should be sent with this new "London Company" to represent the New York Girl to London and European audiences. Clifford won the contest, and the company set sail in late April 1904.

Clifford became an actress, performing in the United States from 1902 and in England from 1904. She returned from London to Boston on 3 July 1906. While generally playing walk-on, non-speaking roles, Clifford became famous nonetheless: not for her talent, but for her beauty, and in the musical show The Catch of the Season which opened at London's Vaudeville Theatre on 9 Sept 1904 she sang a song, "Sylvia, the Gibson Girl". Her trademark style was a long, elegant gown wrapped around her tightly corseted, eighteen-inch wasp waist.

She retired from the stage upon her marriage in 1906. She made a brief return to the stage after the death of her first husband in 1914.

== Personal life ==
In 1906, she was married to Captain the Hon. Henry Lyndhurst Bruce (1881–1914), the eldest son and heir apparent of Henry Bruce, 2nd Baron Aberdare. They had one child, Margaret, but the child died five days after birth. Her first husband was killed during the Great War in 1914 and his younger brother, Clarence, succeeded to the barony upon their father's death.

In 1917, she married Captain John Meredyth Jones Evans. After the war she left the stage for good and later owned a stable of successful racehorses. Together, they were the parents of:

- Capt. Robert Victor John Evans, who married Hon. Cicilie Carol Paget (1928–2013), a daughter of Almeric Paget, 1st Baron Queenborough and the former Edith Starr Miller, in 1926.

Her second husband died in 1957. She died on 28 June 1971.

== Legacy ==
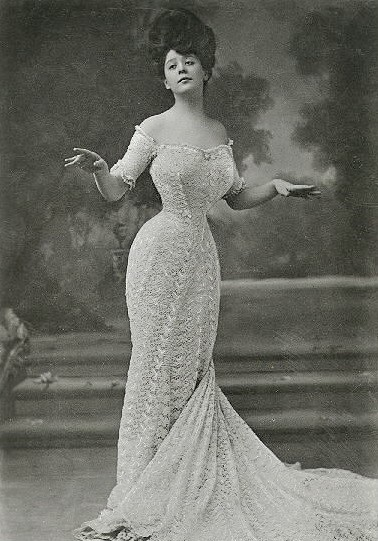
Photograph of Clifford as the Gibson Girl (by Ellis & Walery, c. 1906)

Despite her reputation as "the quintessential Gibson Girl", she was by no means the only person to imitate the popular character on the stage or screen.

Photographs of her taken by Lizzie Caswall Smith in 1905 often appear in historical fashion books and on websites to illustrate the Edwardian style.
