= A Modern Buccaneer =

1894 novel by Rolf Boldrewood

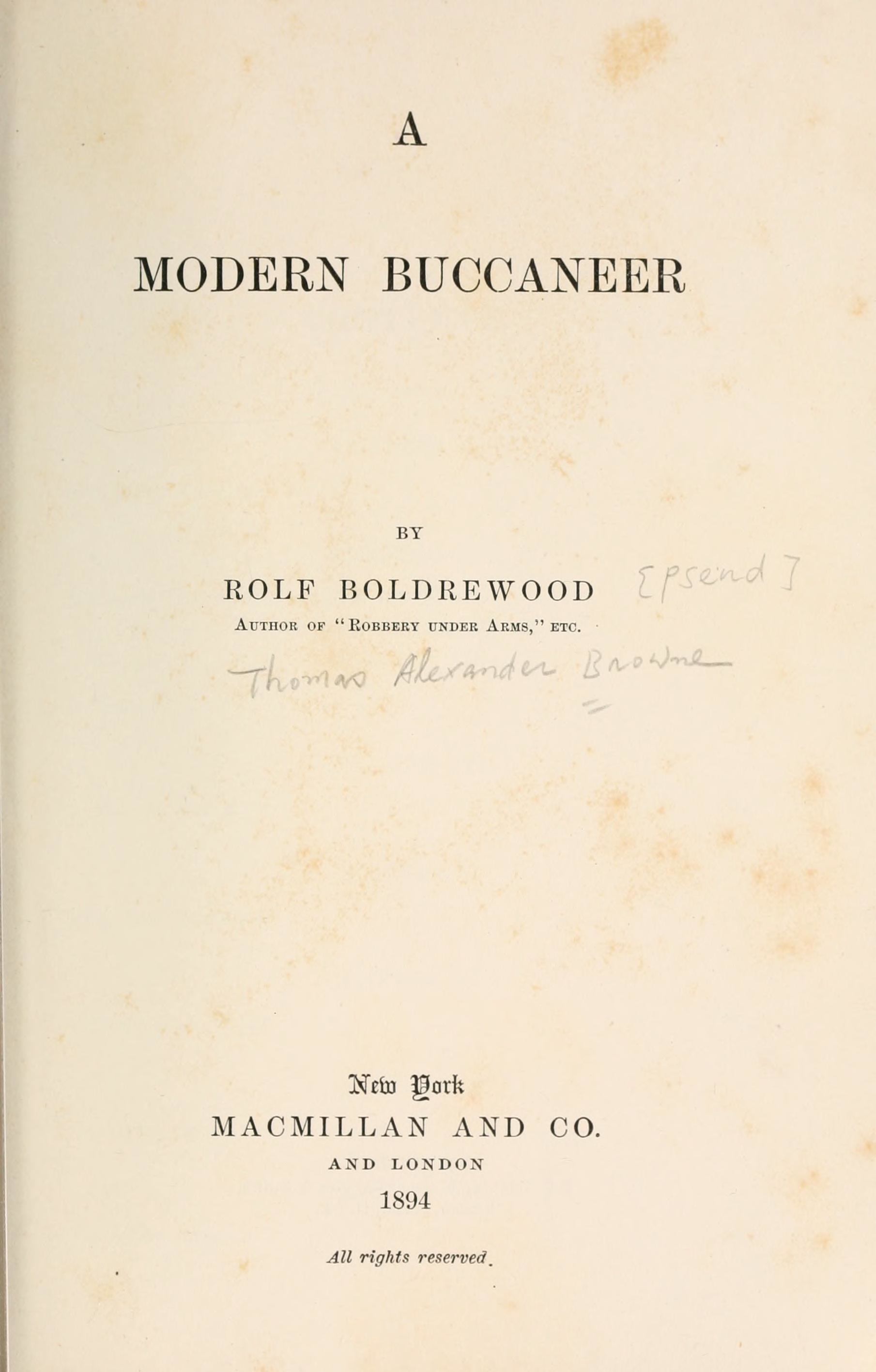
- Title page for A Modern Buccaneer (1894)
- Author: Rolf Boldrewood
- Language: English
- Genre: Fiction
- Publisher: Macmillan, London
- Publication date: 1894
- Publication place: Australia
- Media type: Print
- Pages: 338pp
- Preceded by: The Miner's Right : A Tale of the Australian Goldfields
- Followed by: Plain Living: A Bush Idyll

A Modern Buccaneer (1894) is a novel by Australian writer Rolf Boldrewood.

The book was allegedly originally written by Louis Becke then rewritten by Boldrewood.

== Story outline ==
Set in the South Pacific, this novel is written in the form of an autobiography, told by Hilary Telfer. Fascinated by tales of sailors and South Sea Traders, he leaves Sydney at the age of seventeen to take up a life at sea. The novel follows his adventures and provides a commentary on the trade between the islands and the practice of "blackbirding" that was rife at the time.

The "Buccaneer" of the title is Bully Hayes, an American-born ship's captain, on whose ship Telfer finds himself.

== Critical reception ==
A reviewer in The Australian Star expressed an initial wariness with the novel, given that the author had moved his focus from bushrangers to Buccaneers but "it was well for one who, whether by personal visitation or reading, or intercourse with island men, had made himself familiar with the facts of the island life to weave them into such a romance as people of to-day and to-morrow would read, and possibly remember, and as would help them to an understanding of things as they are or have been. This task Rolf Boldrewood has essayed, and very fairly accomplished...All in all, it may be said that the story, tale, narrative, sketch — we scarce know how to classify it — is plentiful in the incident, and warm as it should be in color."

On the other hand, a reviewer in The Australian Town and Country Journal thought Boldrewood should have stayed with what he knew: "He should stick to his stories of the Australian bush, and of the people whom he knows so much about, and avoid dealing with buccaneers either ancient or modern. He is singularly unqualified for such a subject, and talks of nautical matters in a way which smacks too decidedly of mere amateur, and mere make-belief enthusiasm."

== See also ==
- Full text of the novel from Harvard University Library
- 1894 in Australian literature
