= The Scourge-Stick =

1898 novel by Rosa Praed

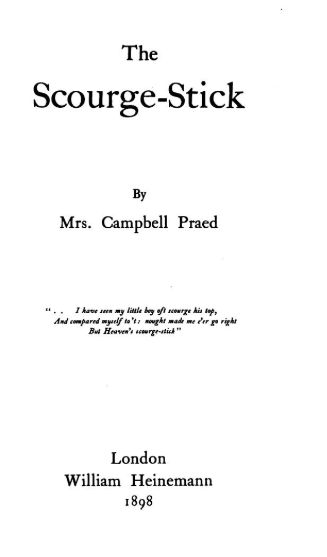
- Title page for The Scourge-Stick (1898)
- Author: Rosa Praed
- Language: English
- Genre: Fiction
- Publisher: Heinemann, London
- Publication date: 1898
- Publication place: Australia
- Media type: Print
- Pages: 367 pp
- Preceded by: Nùlma
- Followed by: Madame Izan

The Scourge-Stick (1898) is a novel by Australian writer Rosa Praed.

== Story outline ==
The novel follows the story of Esther Vassal, a young actress, who marries an older man. Over time her affection for him dies and she takes to literature as an outlet. She becomes attracted to her publisher's advisor, who also happens to be her husband's hated nephew.

== Critical reception ==
A writer in The Advertiser noted that the book "is what the slang of the day calls a 'problem novel,' and the writing is—appropriately we might say, somewhat hysterical. The whole story is pervaded by aa unpleasant—almost a painful—tense of the morasses which underlie the social life of the day."

The reviewer in The Critic referred to the book as "a fine piece of work", but also noted that it was "womanish and neurotic".

A reviewer in The Adelaide Observer didn't think the novel was one of the author's best: "The book is most extravagantly effusive. The characters are all more or less artificial, and from cover to cover there is no gleam of humour to brighten its dreariness. Mrs. Praed has turned out capital work in the past, hut; at present she is evidently 'out of form.'"

== Notes ==
- Dedication: To my son Bulkley
- Epigraph: I have seen my little boy oft scourge his top,/ and compared myself to't: nought made me e'er go right,/ But heaven's scourge-stick

== See also ==
- Full text of the novel from Internet Archive
- 1898 in Australian literature
