= Kirkham's Find =

1897 novel by Mary Gaunt

- Author: Mary Gaunt
- Language: English
- Genre: Fiction
- Publisher: Methuen, London
- Publication date: 1897
- Publication place: Australia
- Media type: Print
- Pages: 264pp
- Preceded by: Dave's Sweetheart
- Followed by: Deadman's: An Australian Story

Kirkham's Find (1897) is a novel by Australian writer Mary Gaunt.

== Story outline ==
Phoebe and Nancy Marsden are sisters living a comfortable existence with their family in rural Victoria. Phoebe is the practical sister, interested in helping the family and refusing a marriage proposal as she does not feel the necessary affection for her suitor. Nancy, on the other hand, marries a well-to-do man twenty years her senior while her lover, Kirkham, is prospecting for gold in Western Australia. Kirkham strikes it rich in WA and upon returning to Victoria and finding Nancy no longer available, turns his affections towards Phoebe.

== Critical reception ==
A reviewer in The Australian found that the book "treats of two widely different phases of Australian life. One is the stirring adventure of gold seekers in the far north, the struggle against drought and savage blacks. The other is the quiet, uneventful existence of a family at Ballarat, and the attempt made by one of the girls to earn her own living by beekeeping and poultry farming." They concluded "Kirkham's Find is a thoroughly readable and interesting novel."

In The West Australian a reviewer noted that "Mary Gaunt has built up an interesting and brightly-written story, full of Australian colour and with an abundance of incident with which to sustain the reader's attention."

== See also ==
- Full text of the novel from Project Gutenberg Australia
- 1897 in Australian literature
