= Paul Grano =

Australian poet and journalist

Paul Langton Grano (22 October 1894 – 11 January 1975) was an Australian poet and journalist.

== Biography ==
Born in Ararat, Victoria, Grano studied law at the University of Melbourne. He worked as a journalist and commercial traveller, and in 1932 moved to Queensland where he worked in the Main Roads Commission. In 1933, he founded the Catholic Poetry Society in Brisbane, and in 1944 the Catholic Readers' and Writers' Society.

== Works ==
- Quest, Melbourne: The Hawthorn Press, 1940
- Poet's Holiday, Brisbane : Yallaroi Publication, 1941
- Poems Old & New, Melbourne: Georgian House, 1945
- Witness to the Stars: an Anthology of Australasian Verse by Catholic Poets, edited by Paul Grano; with foreword by George O'Neill, Sydney: Angus and Robertson, 1946
- Selected Verse of Paul Grano (1894–1975), Melbourne: Hawthorn Press, 1976
