= The Crown of India =

Play

Edward Elgar in 1917

The Crown of India was a masque, an elaborate theatrical presentation, staged in 1912 to celebrate the visit the preceding December of King George V and Queen Mary to Delhi for their coronation as Emperor and Empress of India. For this masque, the English composer Sir Edward Elgar wrote the music as his Op. 66, with a libretto by Henry Hamilton. The masque consisted of two tableaux: "The Cities of Ind" and "Ave Imperator!".

== Music ==
Pieces from the Crown of India Suite played by the U.S. Marine Band:
Menuetto (2:00)

Warrior’s Dance (2:01)

Intermezzo (3:29)

March of the Mogul Emperors (3:48)
All of the above transcribed by Frank Winterbottom in 1913, and played in 2008 for the album Music From the Land of Hope and Glory under direction of Michael Colburn

The masque was first performed at the Coliseum Theatre in London on 11 March 1912. Elgar composed twelve pieces for contralto, bass, chorus and orchestra:

Tableau I: The Cities of Ind

- 1a Introduction
- 1b Sacred Measure
- 2 – Dance of Nautch Girls
- 2a India greets her Cities
- 3 – Song (Agra): 'Hail, Immemorial Ind!' (The homage of Ind)
- 3a Entrance of Calcutta. India: 'Welcome Calcutta!'
- 3b Entrance of Delhi. Delhi: 'Stop! That place is mine'
- 4a Introduction
- 4b March of the Mogul Emperors. India: 'Illustrious Emperors!'
- 5 – Entrance of John Company. Calcutta: 'Good John Company, reply'
- 5a Entrance of St. George. India: 'Calcutta, Delhi, give your quarrel pause'
- 6 – Song (St. George): 'The Rule of England'
- 7 – Interlude

Tableau II: Ave Imperator!

- 8a Introduction
- 8b Warriors' Dance
- 9 – The Cities of Ind. India: 'Hail Festal Hour from out the Ages drawn'
- 10 – March: 'The Crown of India'. India: 'Incessu patuit Imperator'
- 10a The Homage of Ind
- 11 – The Crowning of Delhi
- 12 – Ave Imperator!

== First performance ==
The London Coliseum programme for the first week of the performance shows that The Crown of India masque was the most important of the eleven acts in the show. There were two Tableaux: "The Cities of Ind" and "Ave Imperator!". The programme listed the cast, who personified 'India' herself, England represented by 'St. George', and various Indian cities. There were also attendant performers, in elaborate costumes, personifying other roles. Elgar attended the daily rehearsals for two weeks, then conducted the hour-long show two performances a day for a further two weeks.

The cast included:

- India – Nancy Price
- St. George – Harry Dearth
- Agra – Marion Beeley
- Delhi – May Leslie Stuart
- Calcutta – Evelyn Kerry
- Benares – Sybil Etherington
- Cities, Mogul Emperors, Princes, Guards, Executioners, Courtiers, Fan Bearers, Ladies Attendant Syce, Litter Bearers, Heralds, Trumpeters, etc.

== Extracts ==
Elgar later extracted five of the pieces – 1(a), 2, 5, 8 and 4 – and added an intermezzo for solo violin to create The Crown of India Suite. The first performance was at the Hereford Festival on 11 September 1912, by the London Symphony Orchestra conducted by the composer. The Suite gained immediate popularity: during Elgar's lifetime, there were 102 live performances of it on the BBC.

The Crown of India March from the incidental music for the masque is also performed separately.

== Complete score ==
The complete score for the Crown of India incidental music was only published in a piano-vocal version by Elgar's friend Hugh Blair. The remaining orchestral parts were destroyed in the 1960s. In 2007 the Elgar Society commissioned the composer Anthony Payne to complete the orchestration of the music for The Crown of India. Payne is to "complete the scoring of the piano-vocal version, combining this, where appropriate, with the orchestral suite and march."

== Recordings ==
- The CD with the book Oh, My Horses! Elgar and the Great War has many historical recordings including "Hail, Immemorial Ind", a 1975 recording with Carol Leatherby (soprano) and the Kensington Symphony Orchestra conducted by Leslie Head
- The Anthony Payne orchestration of the complete pageant was recorded by the BBC Philharmonic and Sir Andrew Davis in 2007 (Chandos).

A fine recording exists as part of The Great British Collection. Douglas Bostock conducts The Munich Symphony Orchestra.

== External links and sources ==
- The Crown of India: Scores at the International Music Score Library Project
- The Crown of India, Op. 66 on the site of the Elgar Society
- Jeffrey Richards: Imperialism and Music, Manchester University Press, 2001, ISBN 0-7190-6143-1
