= Edward Hughes (artist) =

British artist (1832–1908)

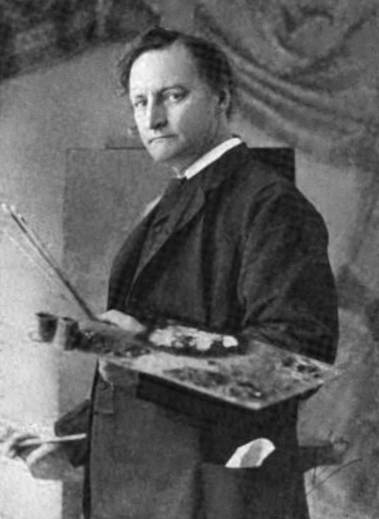
- Hughes photographed by his daughter Alice
- Born: 14 September 1832; Pentonville, England
- Died: 14 May 1908 (aged 75); London, England
- Burial place: Highgate Cemetery
- Education: Royal Academy schools
- Occupation: Artist
- Children: Alice Hughes

Edward Hughes (14 September 1832 – 14 May 1908) was a British artist who specialised in portrait painting.

== Career ==
Edward Hughes was born on 14 September 1832, in Pentonville, to artist George Hughes. From an early age, his artistic ability was recognised. In 1846, he entered the Royal Academy schools and a year later was awarded a silver medal by the Royal Society of Arts for a chalk drawing. Between 1847 and 1884, Hughes exhibited 36 paintings at the Royal Academy. He also worked as an illustrator, collaborating with George du Maurier in producing the images for the Wilkie Collins book Poor Miss Finch. About 1878 he moved more or less exclusively into portrait painting, drawing praise from John Everett Millais for his representation of women.

== Royal Commissions ==
Hughes received his first royal commission in 1895 which resulted in a full-length portrait of Queen Mary. This painting is exhibited in the vestibule of Buckingham Palace. He painted at least three portraits of Queen Alexandra and produced images of Louise, Princess Royal, Princess Victoria, the Queen of Norway, the Duchess of Teck, the Prince of Wales (the future Edward VIII), his brother Prince Albert, and his sister Princess Mary. A number of his paintings remain in the Royal Collection.

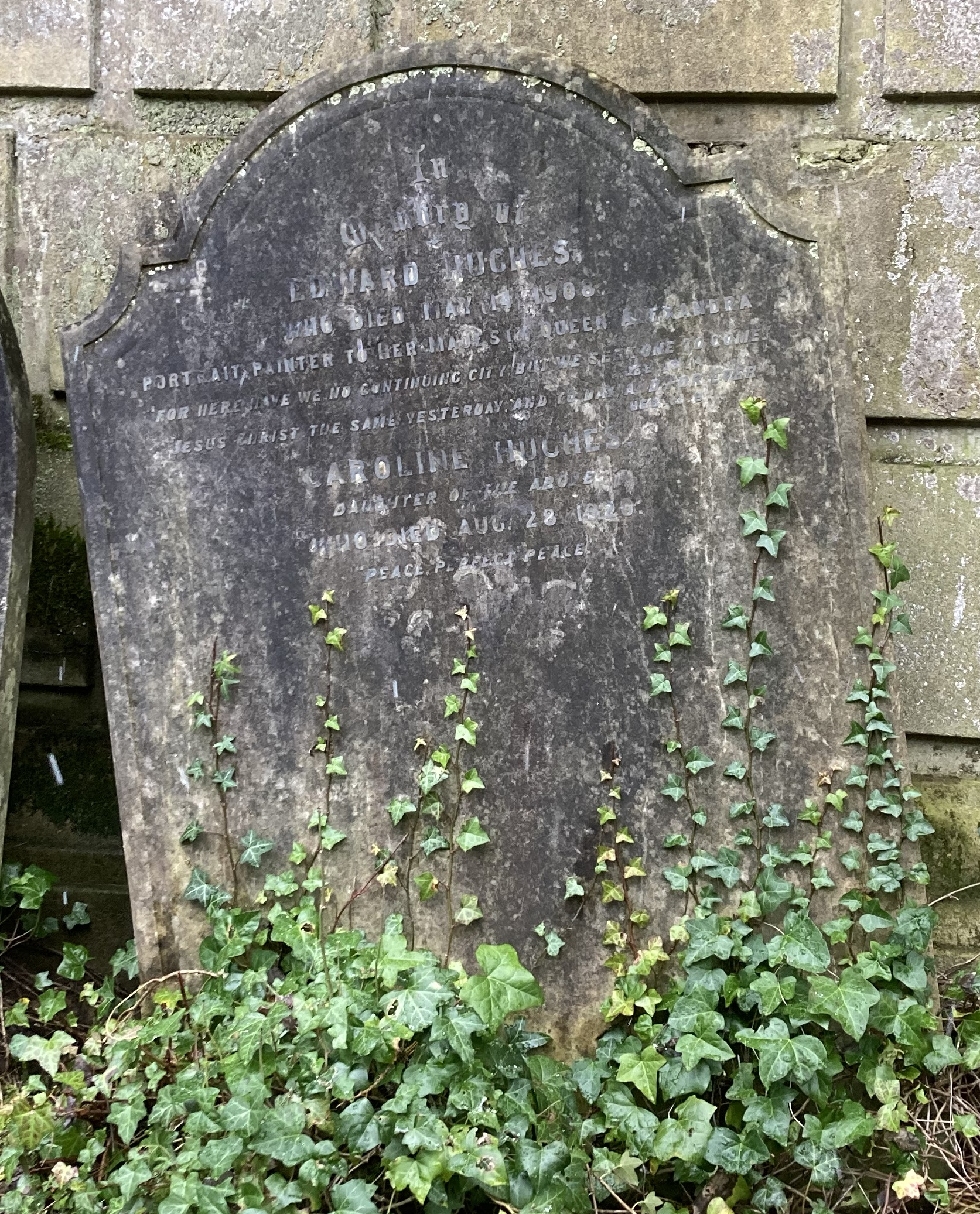
Grave of Hughes in Highgate Cemetery

== Personal life ==
Hughes, who married twice, died from bronchitis at his home in London on 14 May 1908, aged 75, and is buried on the outside of the Circle of Lebanon in Highgate Cemetery.

His eldest daughter and biographer Alice Hughes became a portrait photographer.

== Gallery ==
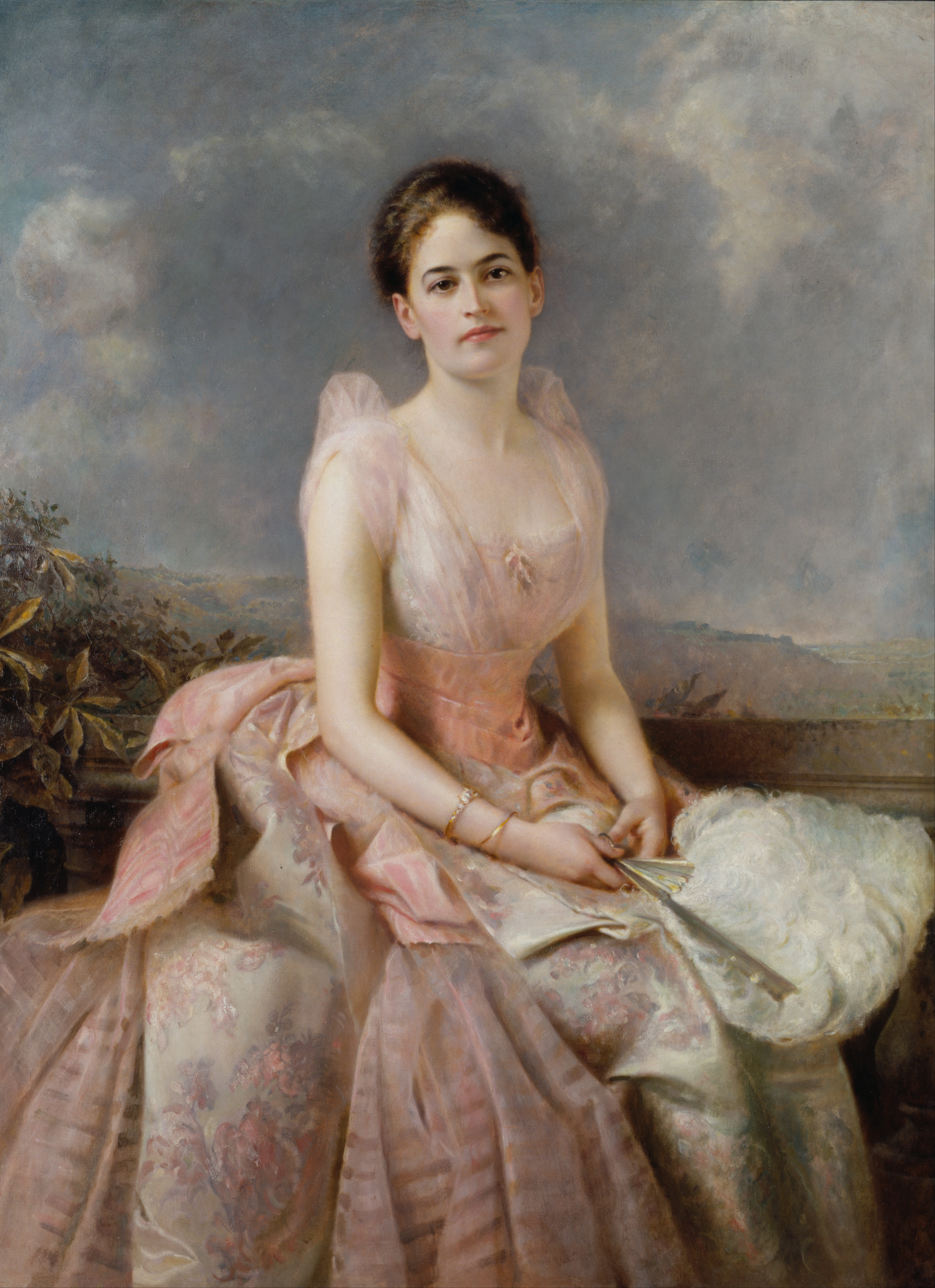
Juliette Gordon Low (1887)

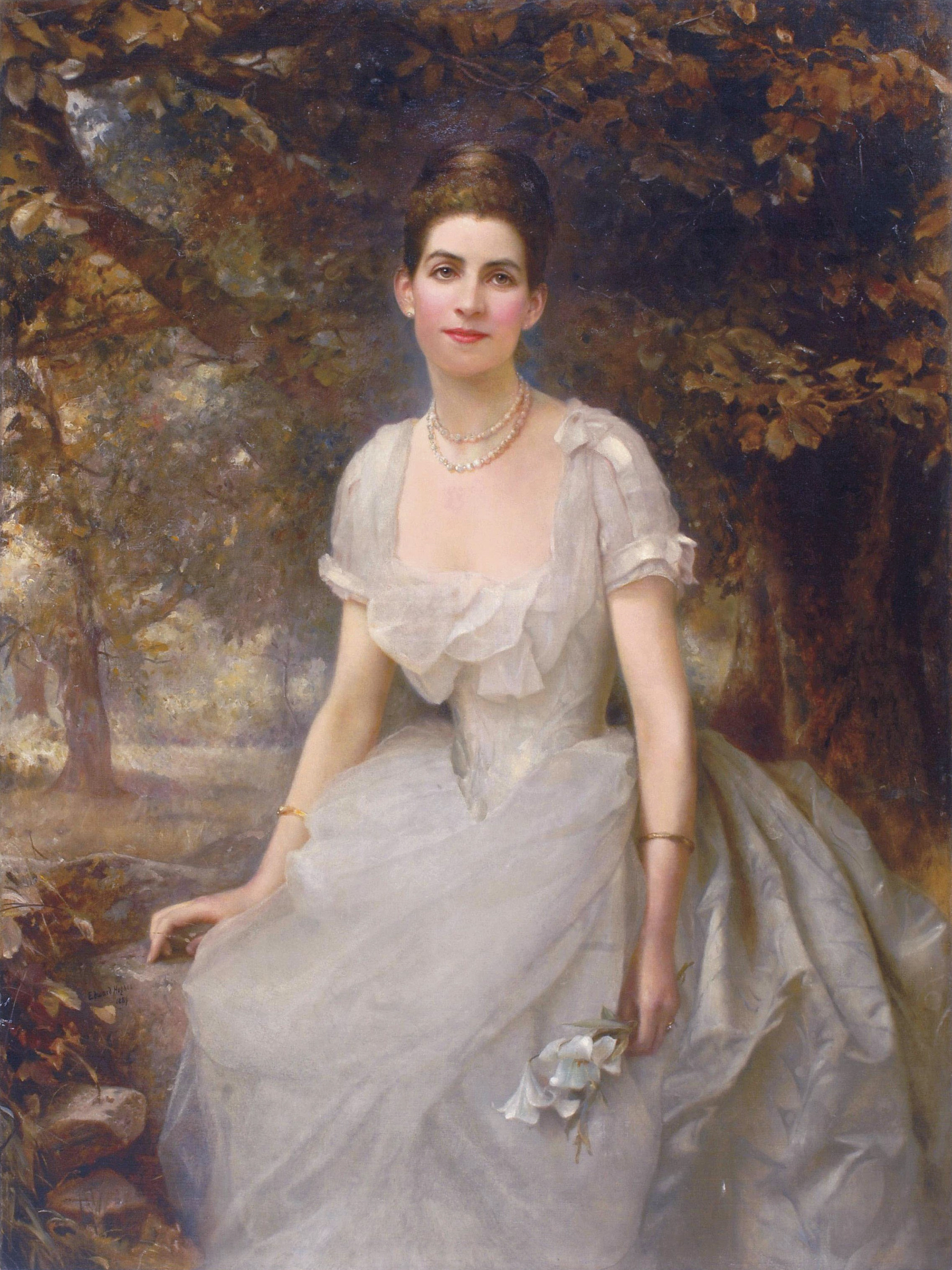
Vere Monckton-Arundell, Viscountess Galway (1889)

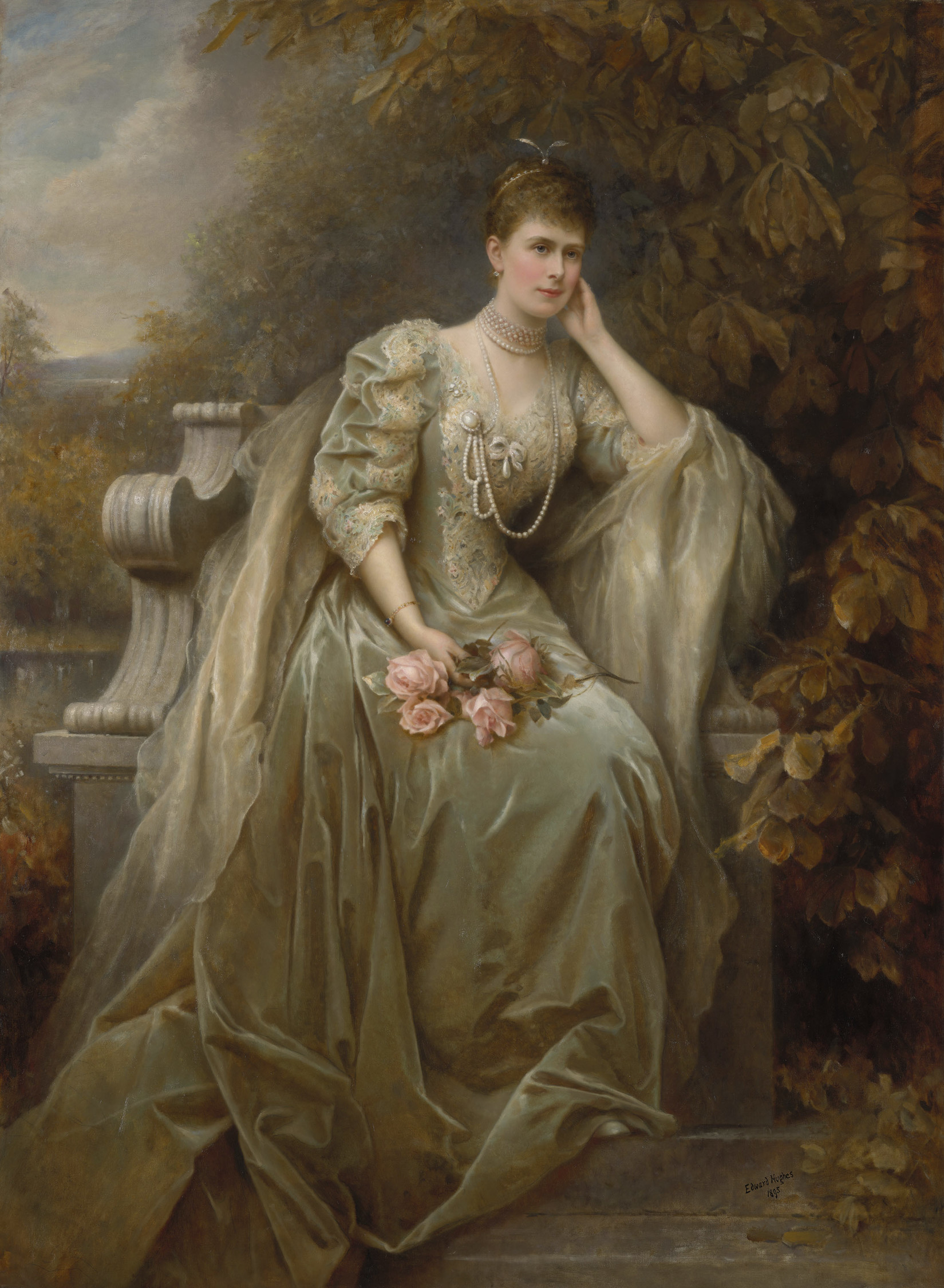
Queen Mary, when Duchess of York (1895)
