= Mary Gaunt =

Australian writer

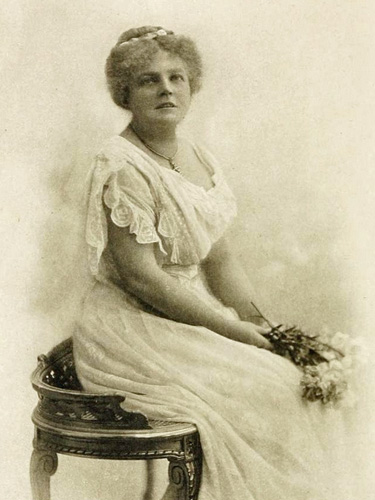
- Mary Gaunt. Image from her book, Alone in West Africa, published in 1912
- Born: Mary Eliza Bakewell Gaunt; 20 February 1861; Chiltern, Victoria
- Died: 19 January 1942 (aged 80); Cannes, France
- Writing career
- Language: English
- Years active: 1887–1938

Mary Eliza Bakewell Gaunt (20 February 1861 – 19 January 1942) was an Australian novelist, born in Chiltern, Victoria. She also wrote collections of short stories, novellas, autobiographies, and non-fiction. She published her first novel Dave's Sweetheart in 1894. Gaunt visited many countries in her life and she wrote about her experiences in five travel books.

== Early life and education ==
Mary was the elder daughter of William Henry Gaunt, a Victorian county court judge and Elizabeth Gaunt, née Palmer (c. 1835–1922), and was born in Chiltern, Victoria. She was educated at Grenville College, Ballarat (Note: Her inclusion in what was a private school for boys may be explained by the fact that her brother Ernest Gaunt (later a vice-admiral) was a student there.) and the University of Melbourne, being one of the first two women students to be admitted there.

== Career ==
In 1894 she married Hubert Lindsay Miller and published her first novel. A year after her husband's death in 1900, Gaunt (now also known as Mrs Mary Miller) went to London. Gaunt left Melbourne on 15 March 1901 and never returned.

A collection of interviews with Mary were published in the 1925 Girls' Own Annual under the headings "Pioneering for Women" parts I, II, and III, and "Strange Journeys I Have Made".

From the early 1920s, Gaunt lived mostly at Bordighera, Italy. In 1940 she fled Italy and died at Cannes in 1942. She had no children.

She had a sister Lucy, and brothers Cecil, Clive, Lancelot, Guy and Ernest; Guy and Ernest were both admirals of the Royal Navy, and Guy later became a Conservative Member of Parliament. All five brothers served in The Great War.

Gaunt was posthumously inducted onto the Victorian Honour Roll of Women in 2002.

== Bibliography ==
=== Novels ===
- Dave's Sweetheart (1894)
- Kirkham's Find (1897)
- Deadman's: An Australian Story (1898)
- Mistress Betty Carew (1903)
- The Arm of the Leopard: A West African Story (1904) [with John Ridgwell Essex]
- Fools Rush In (1906) [with John Ridgwell Essex]
- The Silent Ones (1909) [with John Ridgwell Essex]
- The Mummy Moves (1910)
- The Uncounted Cost (1910)
- Every Man's Desire (1913)
- A Wind from the Wilderness (1919)
- As the Whirlwind Passeth (1923)
- The Forbidden Town (1926)
- Saul's Daughter (1927)
- The Lawless Frontier (1929)
- Joan of the Pilchard (1930)
- Harmony: A Tale of the Old Slave Days of Jamaica (1933)
- Worlds Away (1934)

=== Novellas ===
- Bingley's Gap (1888)
- Down in the World (1893)
- The Other Man (1894)

=== Short story collections ===
- The Moving Finger (1895)
- The Ends of the Earth : Stories (1915)
- The Surrender and Other Happenings (1920)
- Life at Deadman's : Stories of Colonial Victoria (2001)

=== Autobiography ===
- Alone in West Africa (1912)
- A Woman in China (1914)
- A Broken Journey: Wanderings from the Hoang-Ho to Saghalien (1919)

=== Non-fiction ===
- Where the Twain Meet (1922) - travel
- Peeps at Great Men : George Washington and the Men Who Made the American Revolution (1929) - children's
- Reflection in Jamaica (1932) - travel

== Sources ==
- E. Archer, 'Gaunt, Mary Eliza Bakewell (1861 - 1942)', Australian Dictionary of Biography, Volume 8, MUP, 1981, pp 632–633. Retrieved 30 October 2008
- Serle, Percival (1949). "Gaunt, Mary". Dictionary of Australian Biography. Sydney: Angus & Robertson.
- Auslit Gaunt, Mary (birth name: Gaunt, Mary Eliza Bakewell ) (a.k.a. Miller, Mary )
