= Lizzie Caswall Smith =

British photographer

- Born: 1870
- Died: 1958 (aged 87–88)
- Occupation: Photographer

Lizzie Caswall Smith (1870–1958) was an early 20th-century British photographer who specialised in society and celebrity studio portraits, often used for postcards. She was associated with the Women's Suffrage movement and photographed many suffragettes including Flora Drummond, Millicent Fawcett and Christabel Pankhurst. She also photographed actors including Henry Ainley, Camille Clifford, Sydney Valentine Billie Burke, and Maude Fealy.

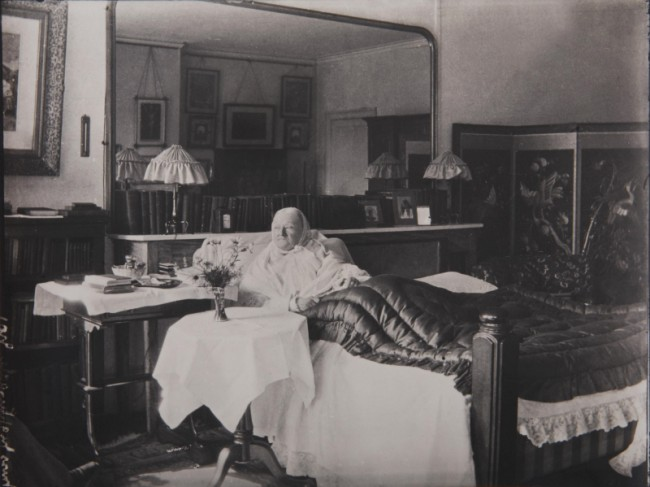
Florence Nightingale photo by Lizzie Caswall Smith 1910

Caswall Smith operated the Gainsborough Studio at 309 Oxford Street from 1907 until 1920 when she moved to 90 Great Russell Street where she stayed until her retirement in 1930 aged 60. She exhibited at the Royal Photographic Society in 1902 and 1913 and her sepia-toned platinotype copies of photographs of Peter Llewelyn Davies Michael Llewelyn Davies and J. M. Barrie are in the collection of the National Portrait Gallery.

On 19 November 2008 a rare black-and-white photograph of Florence Nightingale taken in 1910 by Lizzie Caswall Smith was auctioned by Dreweatts auction house in Newbury, Berkshire, England, for £5,500. On the back of the photograph Caswall Smith had noted in pencil "Florence Nightingale taken just before she died, House nr Park Lane (London). The only photograph I ever took out of studio – I shall never forget the experience."
