= Alice Hughes =

British photographer (1857–1939)

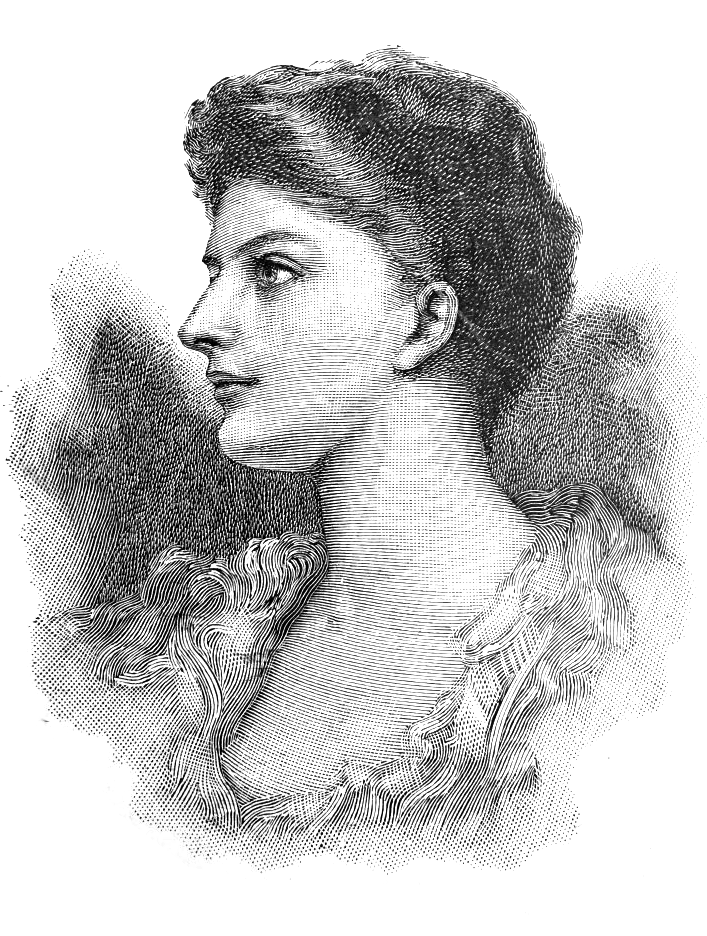
- Illustration of Alice Hughes, unknown artist
- Born: 31 August 1857; London, England
- Died: 4 April 1939 (aged 81); Worthing, England
- Family: Edward Hughes (father)

Alice Mary Hughes (31 August 1857 – 4 April 1939) was a British portrait photographer and businesswoman specializing in images of royalty, fashionable women and children.

== Biography ==
Alice Hughes was the eldest daughter of the portrait painter Edward Hughes (1832–1908). After studying photography at the London Polytechnic she opened a studio in 1891 next to her father's in Gower Street, London, which she operated until December 1910. In her day, she was a leading photographer of royalty, fashionable women and children, producing elegant platinotype prints. During her most successful periods, she employed up to 60 women and took up to 15 sittings a day. In 1914, for a short period before the First World War, she ran a business in Berlin but returned to London at the beginning of the war, opening a studio in Ebury Street in 1915. The Ebury Street studio was not as successful as her first business and she closed it in 1933, retiring to Worthing where she died after a fall in her bedroom in 1939.

From 1898 to 1909, she contributed several hundred portraits to Country Life. In 1910, she sold 50,000 negatives to Speaight Ltd.

== Assessment ==
A pioneer of portrait photography, Hughes developed a distinctive style "by fusing the conventions of society portraiture with the cool, monochromatic tones of the platinum print." (From Oxford Dictionary of National Biography.)

== Gallery ==
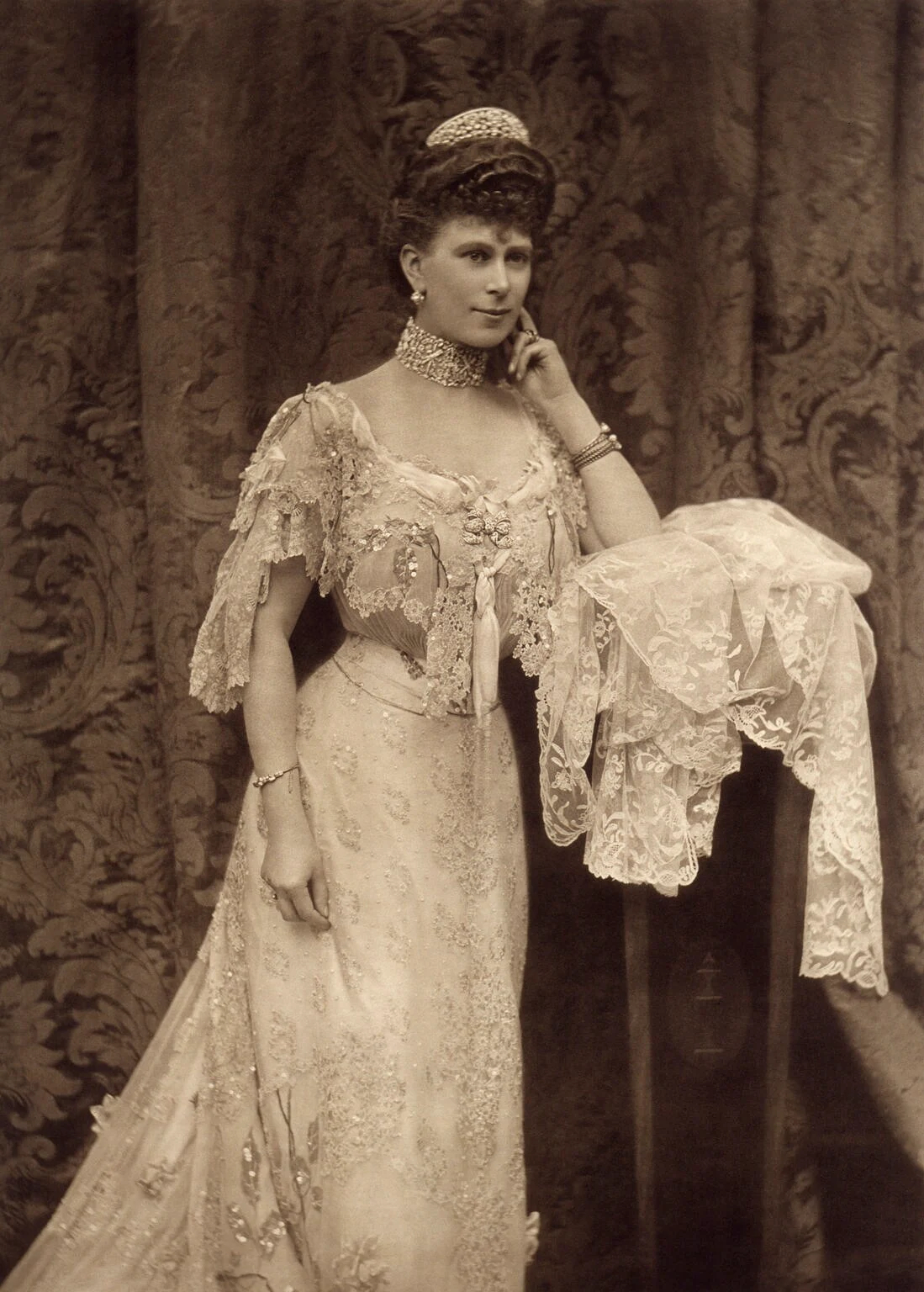
Queen Mary (1905)

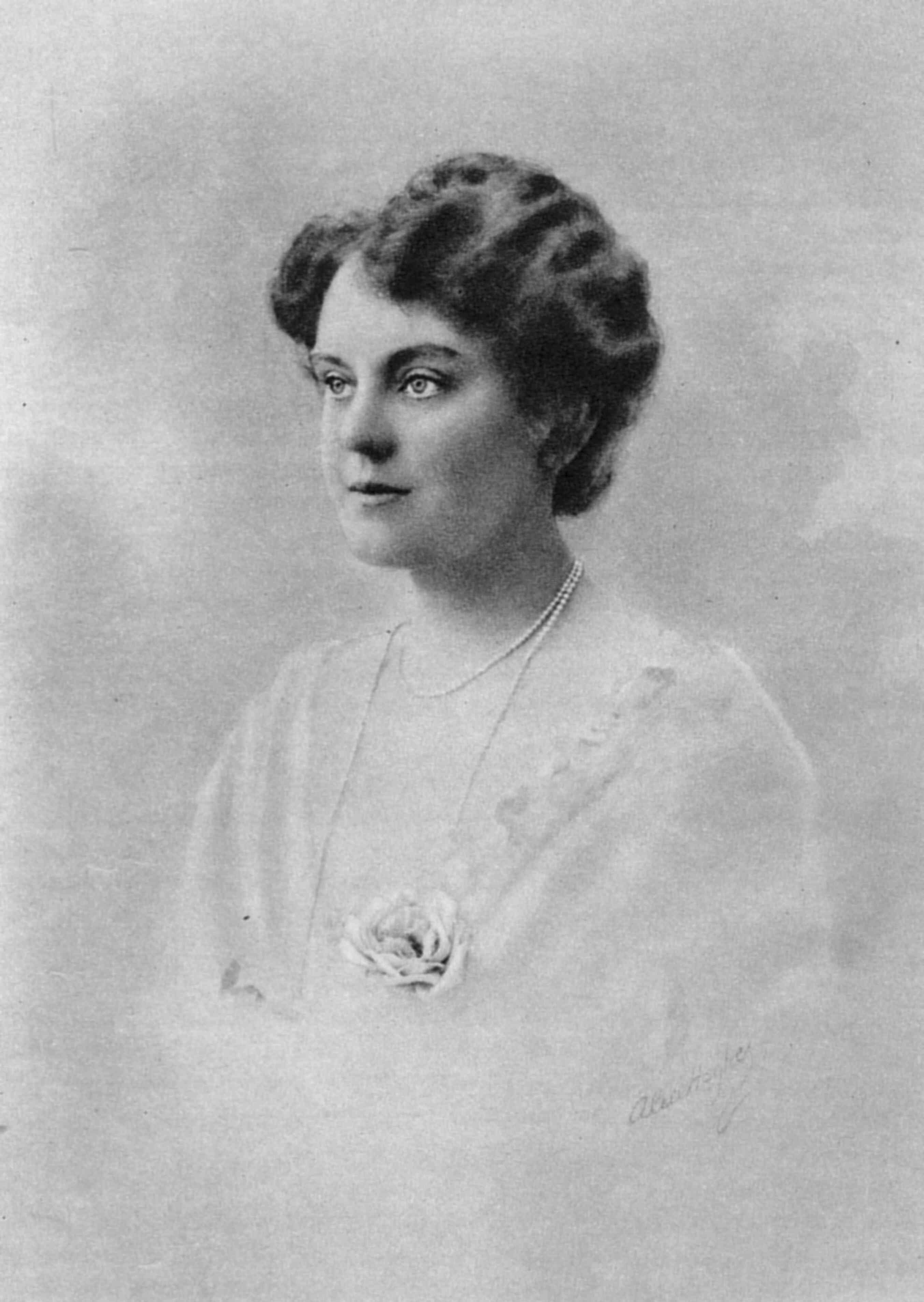
Lady Jellicoe (1917)

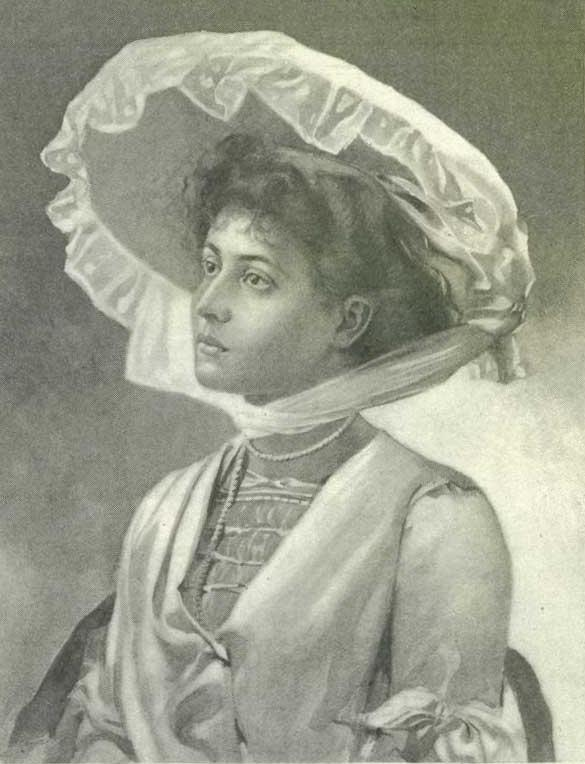
Pauline Astor (1904)

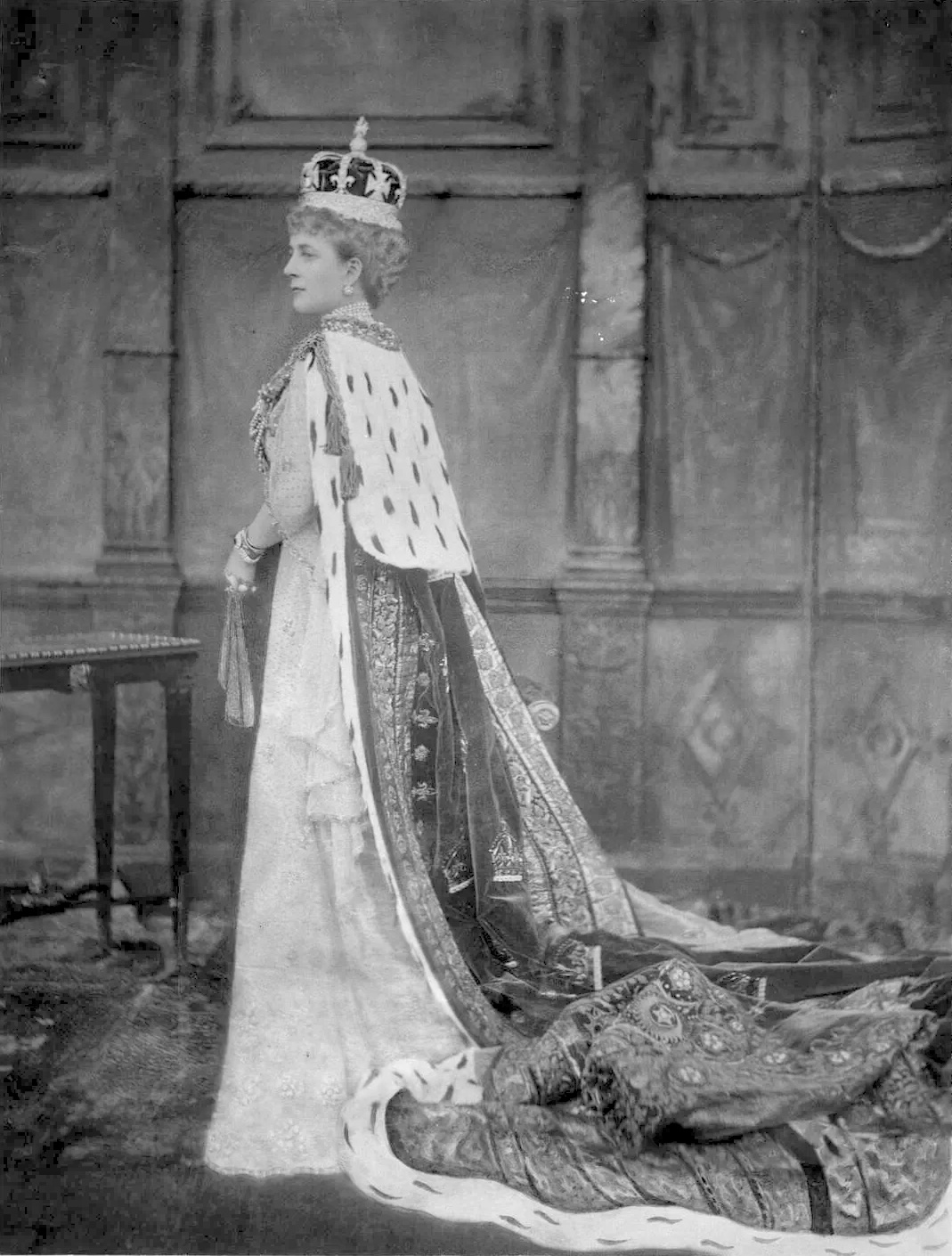
Alexandra of Denmark (1902)
