= 1893 in Australian literature =

This article presents a list of the historical events and publications of Australian literature during 1893.

== Books ==
- Carlton Dawe – The Emu's Head : A Chronicle of Dead Man's Flat
- E. W. Hornung – Tiny Luttrell
- Rosa Praed
  - Christina Chard: A Novel
  - Outlaw and Lawmaker

== Short stories ==
- John Arthur Barry
  - "Number One North Rainbow"
  - "Sojur Jim"
  - Steve Brown's Bunyip and Other Stories
- Louis Becke
  - "Challis, the Doubter: The White Lady and the Brown Woman"
  - "The Fate of the Alida"
- Ernest Favenc
  - The Last of Six: Tales of the Austral Tropics
  - "My Only Murder"
- Henry Lawson
  - "A Camp-Fire Yarn"
  - "A Love Story"
  - "The Man Who Forgot"
  - "On the Edge of a Plain"
  - "The Union Buries Its Dead"

== Poetry ==
- Randolph Bedford – "The Days of '84"
- E. J. Brady – "Laying on the Screw : The Other Side of the Wool-Trade"
- Edward Dyson – "When the Bell Blew Up"
- G. Herbert Gibson – Ironbark Chips and Stockwhip Cracks
- Henry Lawson
  - "The Great Grey Plain"
  - "Out Back"
- Louisa Lawson – "To My Sister"
- Louise Mack – "Manly Lagoon"
- Breaker Morant – "Since the Country Carried Sheep"
- A. B. Paterson
  - "Black Swans"
  - "A Bush Christening"
  - "The Geebung Polo Club"

== Births ==
A list, ordered by date of birth (and, if the date is either unspecified or repeated, ordered alphabetically by surname) of births in 1893 of Australian literary figures, authors of written works or literature-related individuals follows, including year of death.

- 15 May – Myra Morris, poet and novelist (died 1966)
- 10 June – Martin Boyd, novelist (died 1972)
- 23 June – Frank Dalby Davison, novelist (died 1970)
- 8 July – Kay Glasson Taylor, novelist (died 1998)
- 25 August — Isabel Mary Mitchell, novelist (died 1973)
- 27 November — Frank Clune, novelist and travel writer (died 1971)

== Deaths ==
A list, ordered by date of death (and, if the date is either unspecified or repeated, ordered alphabetically by surname) of deaths in 1893 of Australian literary figures, authors of written works or literature-related individuals follows, including year of birth.

- 19 May – Henry Halloran, poet (born 1811)
- 4 September – Francis William Adams, novelist (born 1862)

== See also ==
- 1893 in Australia
- 1893 in literature
- 1893 in poetry
- List of years in Australian literature
- List of years in literature
