= 1890 in Australian literature =

This article presents a list of the historical events and publications of Australian literature during 1890.

== Books ==
- Ada Cambridge – Not All in Vain : A Novel
- Carlton Dawe – The Golden Lake
- E. W. Hornung – A Bride from the Bush
- Fergus Hume — Miss Mephistopheles
- Alick Macleod – An Australian Girl
- Hume Nisbet
  - Ashes: A Tale of Two Spheres
  - Bail Up!: A Romance of Bushrangers and Blacks

== Short stories ==
- Marcus Clarke — Australian Tales
- Ernest Favenc
  - "A Haunt of the Jinkarras: A Fearsome Story of Central Australia"
  - "Spirit-Led"
- Henry Lawson – "The Third Murder: A New South Wales Tale"
- Price Warung
  - "How Muster-Master Stoneman Earned His Breakfast"
  - "Lieutenant Darrell's Predicament"
  - "Under the Whip, or, The Parson's Lost Soul"

== Children's and Young Adult ==
- Ernest Favenc – The Secret of the Australian Desert

== Poetry ==
- Barcroft Boake – "Jack's Last Muster"
- Victor J. Daley – "Even So"
- Edward Dyson – "The Trucker"
- Henry Lawson
  - "The Fire at Ross's Farm"
  - "Middleton's Rouseabout"
  - "The Song of Old Joe Swallow"
- A. B. Paterson
  - "Conroy's Gap"
  - "The Daylight is Dying"
  - "The Man from Snowy River"
  - "On Kiley's Run"

== Essays ==
- Louisa Lawson – "That Nonsensical Idea"

== Births ==
A list, ordered by date of birth (and, if the date is either unspecified or repeated, ordered alphabetically by surname) of births in 1890 of Australian literary figures, authors of written works or literature-related individuals follows, including year of death.

- 28 March – Alec Chisholm, encyclopaedist (died 1977)
- 18 May – Zora Cross, poet (died 1964)
- 31 May — James Devaney, novelist (died 1976)
- 1 September – Arthur W. Upfield, novelist (died 1964)
- 19 October – Nina Murdoch, poet (died 1976)
- 13 December – Dulcie Deamer, poet (died 1972)

== Deaths ==
A list, ordered by date of death (and, if the date is either unspecified or repeated, ordered alphabetically by surname) of deaths in 1890 of Australian literary figures, authors of written works or literature-related individuals follows, including year of birth.

- 25 August – Emily Manning, journalist and writer (born 1845)

== See also ==
- 1890 in Australia
- 1890 in literature
- 1890 in poetry
- List of years in Australian literature
- List of years in literature
