= Coradgery, New South Wales =

Rural locality in New South Wales, Australia

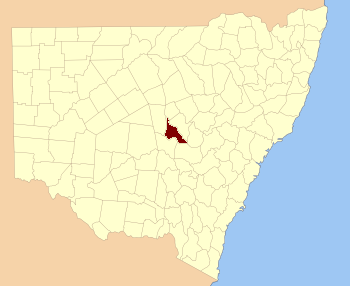
Kennedy County NSW.

Coradgery located at 32°48′54″S 148°00′04″ is a rural locality of Parkes Shire situated near the Bogan River, in New South Wales, Australia.

The first freehold land leases were granted in September 1848, the first four including Coradgery (the others being Coobang, Burrawang, and Gunningbland). By December 1849, the property was sought to be owned by gentlemen Bray and Palmer. It was given to be 20 030 acres and capable of hosting 750 head of cattle. By 1859, it was brothers George and John Palmer, who used as cattle brands an upside-down 'GP', and a '-B'. The cattle were 'store cattle' indicating the property was used for breeding and fattening before being sold for market. By 1874 however the property was stocked with 6000 sheep.

Later the property would be owned by the Balcombe family, principally Herbert Henty Balcombe (d. October 1941). Well known for its racehorse breeding, the property had a race track, trotting track and a polo field. Its picnic races often drew two-thousand people. Balcombe sold the property in 1920.

Balcombe and the property were mentioned by Scottish Border poet and Australian bush balladeer Will H. Ogilvie in his 1897 poem For the honor Old England, and the glory of the game (A viracious history of international polo.). The polo match included a captain of Australian commerce, (H)ugh Victor Foy, the poet himself, as well as Breaker Morant. The poem, given to be based on a true event, was written after Banjo Paterson's 1893 poem The Geebung Polo Club.

At one time the area had the Coradgery and District Progress Association, a race club, and T. Farnsworth was the proprietor of the hotel. Gold had been discovered in the area by 1883. In 1906, a small goldfield was in operation.
