= Geebung =

Geebung may refer to:

- The Geebung Polo Club, a poem by Banjo Paterson
- Geebung, Queensland, a suburb in the City of Brisbane, Queensland, Australia
- Persoonia, a genus of shrubs and small trees in the subfamily Persoonioideae in the large and diverse plant family Proteaceae, commonly known as geebungs and snottygobbles
