= A Treasury of Bush Verse =

1991 poetry anthology edited by G. A Wilkes

- Author: G. A. Wilkes
- Language: English
- Genre: Poetry anthology
- Publisher: Angus and Robertson
- Publication date: 1991
- Publication place: Australia
- Media type: Print
- Pages: 85 pp.
- ISBN: 0207173001

A Treasury of Bush Verse is an anthology of bush verse edited by G. A. Wilkes, published by Angus and Robertson in 1991.

The collection contains 47 poems, from a number of authors and sources.

== Contents ==
- "My Country", Dorothea Mackellar
- "Botany Bay", Anonymous
- "The Wild Colonial Boy", Anonymous
- "The Overlander", Anonymous
- "The Banks of the Condamine", Anonymous
- "Stringy Bark and Green Hide", George Chanson
- "The Old Bullock Dray", Anonymous
- "Click Go the Shears", Anonymous
- "Flash Jack from Gundagai", Anonymous
- "Down Where the Coolibahs Grow", Horace A. Flower
- "A Mid-Summer Noon in the Australian Forest", Charles Harpur
- "The Sick Stock-Rider", Adam Lindsay Gordon
- "Finis Exoptatus", Adam Lindsay Gordon
- "Where the Dead Men Lie", Barcroft Boake
- "The Women of the West", George Essex Evans
- "The Last of His Tribe", Henry Kendall
- "The Cattle Hunters", Henry Kendall
- "Bell-Birds", Henry Kendall
- "A Bushman's Song", A. B. Paterson
- "Waltzing Matilda : Carrying a Swag", A. B. Paterson
- "The Man from Snowy River", A. B. Paterson
- "Clancy of the Overflow", A. B. Paterson
- "Saltbush Bill", A. B. Paterson
- "The Man from Ironbark", A. B. Paterson
- "A Bush Christening", A. B. Paterson
- "Been There Before", A. B. Paterson
- "The Geebung Polo Club", A. B. Paterson
- "Andy's Gone with Cattle", Henry Lawson
- "The Ballad of the Drover", Henry Lawson
- "The Shearers", Henry Lawson
- "The Teams", Henry Lawson
- "Middleton's Rouseabout", Henry Lawson
- "Freedom on the Wallaby", Henry Lawson
- "Cockies of Bungaree", Anonymous
- "Wallaby Stew", Anonymous
- "Nine Miles from Gundagai", Jack Moses
- "Shearing in the Bar", Duke Tritton
- "The Song of the Wattle", Veronica Mason
- "Said Hanrahan", 'John O'Brien'
- "Tangmalangaloo", 'John O'Brien'
- "Fourteen Men", Mary Gilmore
- "Country Towns", Kenneth Slessor
- "Crow Country", Kenneth Slessor
- "Remittance Man", Judith Wright
- "South of My Days", Judith Wright
- "Up-Country Pubs", Colin Thiele
- "Sydney and the Bush", Les Murray

== Critical reception ==
A review in Australian Bookseller & Publisher by Claire James called this a "nostalgic anthology of verse celebrating Australia's bush tradition." The review concluded this "is an excellent introduction for Australian youth uninitiated in the joys of the classics, and an inviting revisit for die-hards."

== See also ==
- 1991 in Australian literature
