= The bush =

Term for hinterlands in several countries

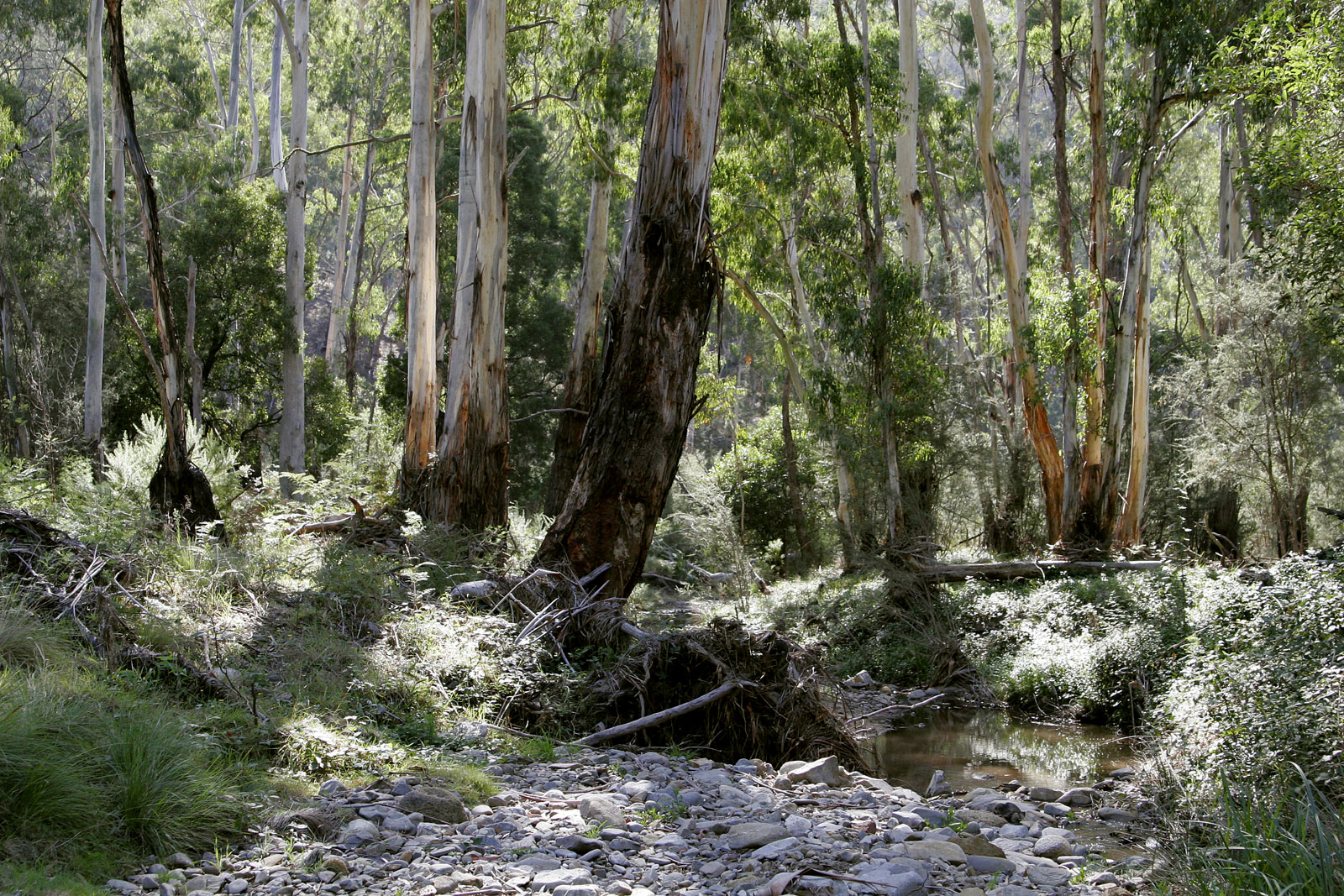
The Australian bush

"The bush", a term mostly used in the English vernacular of Australia, New Zealand, Canada and South Africa, is largely synonymous with hinterlands or backwoods. The fauna and flora contained within the bush is typically native to the region, although exotic species may also be present. The word derives from Old French bos, and Old Norse buski, and related to Dutch bos and German Busch with the sense ‘uncultivated country’ coming directly from Dutch bos.

The expression has been in use in Australia from the earliest years of British settlement, and it has inspired many derivative Australian English terms, such as bush tucker, bush mechanic, bush ballad and bushranger. The term is also widely used in Canada and the American state of Alaska to refer to the large, forested portions of their landscapes.

== Usage by country ==
=== Australia ===
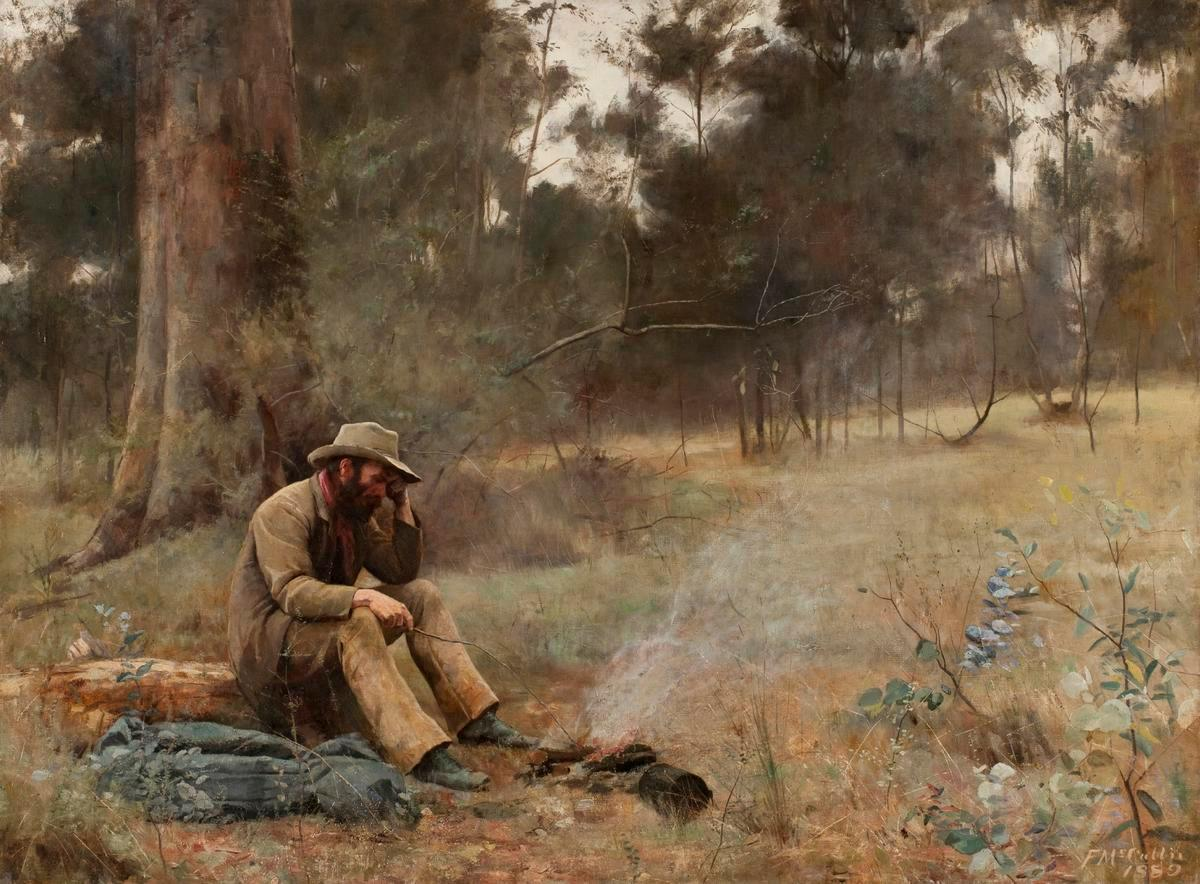
Frederick McCubbin's 1889 painting Down on His Luck shows a swagman camping in the bush. McCubbin and other members of the Heidelberg School art movement depicted the bush in many of their paintings, contributing to its mythological status within Australian culture.

The term "the bush" was imprinted in developing Australian English as a sign of settlers’ attempts to relate to their adopted country, so very different from the green British and Irish landscapes familiar to them, to refer at first to wilderness, and then to any sparsely inhabited region, regardless of vegetation.

"The bush" in this sense became an iconic concept uniquely Australian a signifier also of a pioneering or adventuring spirit. Early uses of the term appear from the late 1700s, frequently in Dawson's The Present State of Australia of 1831, and in the 1839 compilation A Voice from the Bush in Australia, in which unnamed immigrants' letters are reproduced.

Conversely, the word attached to fear of the unknown, as a place of danger from bushfire, venomous or predatory creatures, and hostile Aboriginals, a vast interior in which settlers, especially their children, could be lost, the latter most notably being the theme of Joan Lindsay's 1967 novel Picnic at Hanging Rock.

The term "Outback" is also used, but usually in association with the more arid inland areas of Australia, as is, to a lesser degree "mulga". "The bush" also refers to any populated region outside of the major metropolitan areas, including mining and agricultural areas. Consequently, it is not unusual to have a mining town in the desert such as Port Hedland (population 14,000) referred to as "the bush".

The First Nations over thousands of years developed ways of utilising natural resources for survival, mainly with bush tucker and the physical and spiritual healing of bush medicine. For more than a century after the first British settlement in 1788 onwards, land was squatted, granted or sold to settlers and returned soldiers, resulting in many generally small but permanent human settlements in vast tracts of bush. Closer settlement in Australia has often resulted in fragmentation of the bush, and bushfires, an ever-present hazard in many areas in summer months, have become more frequent with increasing suburbanisation of the Australian population.

The bush is a frequent theme or setting in Australian literature. Bush poets such as Henry Lawson, in such works as The Bush Girl (1901) or The Bush Undertaker (1892) and Banjo Paterson in A Bushman's Song (1892), In Defence of the Bush (1892), or A Bush Christening (1893), revered the bush as a source of national ideals, as did contemporaneous painters in the Heidelberg School such as Tom Roberts (1856–1931), Arthur Streeton (1867–1943) and Frederick McCubbin (1855–1917). Romanticising the bush in this way through folklore cultivated 19th-century Australians' development of a distinct self-identity.

Thus Australians, New Zealanders and South Africans attach the term "bush" to any number of other entities or activities to describe their rural, country or folk nature; examples being such expressions as "bush telegraph", an informal human network through which news is passed on; "bush carpenter", a rough-and-ready builder; "to go bush", to escape from your usual haunts; improvised "bush cricket", "bush music" (Australian folk music); "bush doof"; and the word bushranger, for the 19th-century criminals mainly in the eastern colonies who hid in the bush to escape from authorities. To be "bushed" is to be lost or exhausted.

=== New Zealand ===
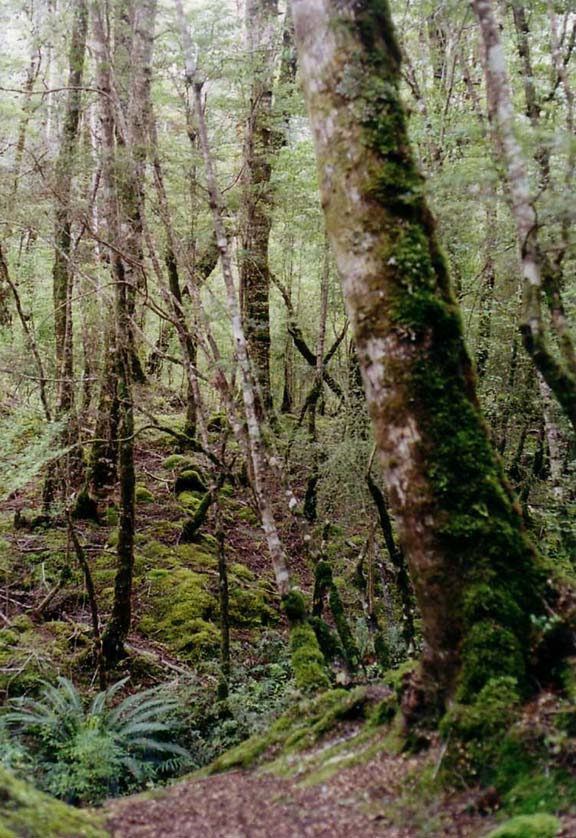
New Zealand's bush is variable in appearance, but generally the term connotes densely forested areas, like this one around Lake Gunn in Fiordland.

In New Zealand, bush primarily refers to areas of native trees rather than exotic forests. However, the word is also used in the Australian sense of anywhere outside urban areas, encompassing grasslands as well as forests.

Areas with bush (i.e. native forest) are found in both the North Island and the South Island, some of it bordering towns and cities, but the majority of bush is found in large national parks. Examples of predominantly bush clad areas are Whanganui National Park, on Taranaki volcano, on which the bush extends in a uniformly circular shape to the surrounding farmland, and Fiordland in the South Island. Much of Stewart Island/Rakiura is bush-covered. In the North Island, the largest areas of bush cover the main ranges stretching north-northeast from Wellington towards East Cape, notably including the Urewera Ranges, and the catchment of the Whanganui River. Significant stands remain in Northland and the ranges running south from the Coromandel Peninsula towards Ruapehu, and isolated remnants cap various volcanoes in Taranaki, the Waikato, the Bay of Plenty and the Hauraki Gulf.

From the word comes many phrases including:

- bush-bash – to make one's way through the forest, rather than on a track or trail (cf. American English "bushwhack[ing]", "bushwack[ing]", or "bush-whack[ing]").
- bush shirt – a woolen shirt or Swanndri, often worn by forest workers.
- bush lawyer – the name of a number of native climbing plants or a layman who expounds on legal matters.
- bush walk – short day walks (hikes) in the bush
- going bush – to live in the bush for an extended period of time, which may include "living off the land" by means of hunting or fishing.
- bushman – Used in the 19th century for New Zealand loggers. The term still stands for someone that lives in the bush as a means of preferable lifestyle.

=== South Africa ===
In South Africa, the term (Afrikaans: die bos) has specific connotations of rural areas which are not open veldt. Generally, it refers to areas in the north of the country that would be called savanna. "Going to The Bush" (Bos toe Gaan) often refers to going to a game park or game reserve. Areas most commonly referred to as The Bush are the Mpumalanga and Limpopo Lowveld, The Limpopo River Valley, northern KwaZulu-Natal or any other similar area of wilderness.

=== United States (Alaska) and Canada ===
The Bush in Alaska is generally described as any community not "on the road system", making it accessible only by more elaborate transportation. Usage is similar in Canada; it is called la brousse or colloquially le bois in Canadian French. In Canada, "the bush" refers to large expanses of forest and swampland which sprawl undeveloped, as well as any forested area.

== Related terms ==
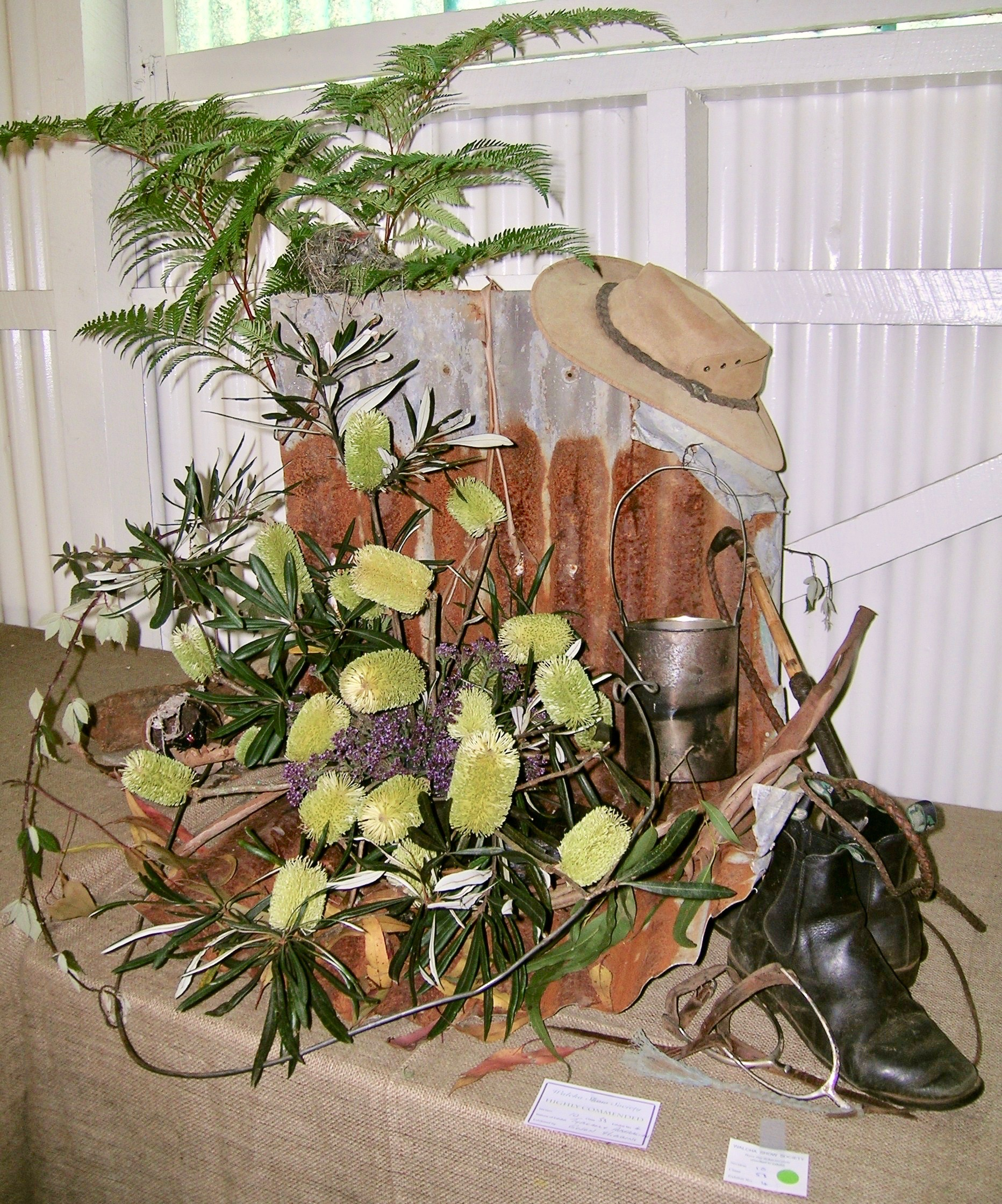
Icons of the Australian bush: bracken, corrugated iron, eucalyptus leaves, banksia, bramble, felt hat, billy, stockwhip and elastic-side boots

The term "to go bush" has several similar meanings all connected with the supposed wildness of the bush. It can mean to revert to a feral nature (or to "go native"), and it can also mean to deliberately leave normal surroundings and live rough, with connotations of cutting off communication with the outside world – often as a means of evading capture or questioning by the police. The term bushwhacker is used in Australia and New Zealand to mean someone who spends his or her time in the bush. Going bush, or living in bushland, is a major trope in New Zealand fiction, popularised in such novels as Barry Crump's "A Good Keen Man" (see Man alone).

The verb to bushwhack has two meanings. One is to cut through heavy brush and other vegetation to pass through tangled country: "We had to do quite a bit of bushwhacking today to clear the new trail." The other meaning is to hide in such areas and then attack unsuspecting passers-by: "We were bushwhacked by the bandits as we passed through their territory and they took all of our money and supplies."

The Bushwhackers were also a New Zealand professional wrestling tag team that was inducted into the WWE Hall of Fame class of 2015.

In New Zealand, "The Bush" is a nickname for the Wairarapa Bush provincial rugby team. The team was formed by an amalgamation of two earlier teams, Wairarapa and Bush. The latter team had represented an area on the boundaries of the Wairarapa and Hawke's Bay which was in former times known as Bush due to its dense vegetation cover.

In the United States, minor league baseball, which is typically played in smaller cities, is sometimes derisively called "bush league baseball".

In Australia, "Sydney or the bush" equates with such terms as "Hollywood or bust" to mean staking total success or failure on one high-risk venture.

== See also ==
- Backcountry
- Black stump
- Bush flying
- Bush mechanic
- Bushcraft
- Bushland
- Deserts of Australia
- Wilderness
- Wild west
