= Saltbush Bill's Second Fight =

1893 poem by Banjo Paterson

- by Banjo Paterson
- First published in: The Antipodean
- Country: Australia
- Language: English
- Publication date: December 1897
- Preceded by: "Saltbush Bill"
- Followed by: "Saltbush Bill's Gamecock"

Full text
- Saltbush Bill's Second Fight at Wikisource

Saltbush Bill's Second Fight is a humorous poem by Australian writer and poet Andrew Barton "Banjo" Paterson. It was first published in The Antipodean in the 1897 Christmas edition.

Saltbush Bill was one of Paterson's best known characters who appeared in 5 poems: "Saltbush Bill" (1894), "Saltbush Bill's Second Fight" (1897), "Saltbush Bill's Gamecock" (1898), "Saltbush Bill on the Patriarchs" (1903), and "Saltbush Bill, J.P." (1905).

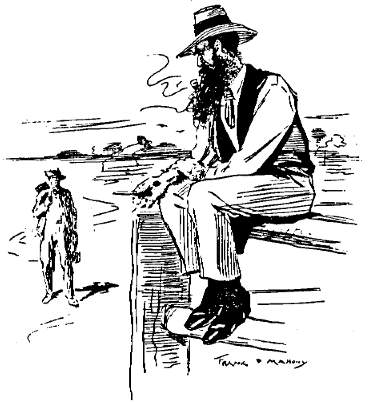
Illustration from original publication of "Saltbush Bill's Second Fight" - Stingy Smith meets the tramp

== Plot summary ==
Saltbush Bill is droving his sheep towards Castlereagh and Stingy Smith, the owner of Hard Times Hill station is worried that Bill's sheep will ruin his run. He chances on a travelling tramp, and finding out the man is a fighter, arranges for him to get Bill into a fight and tells him it's "a five-pound job if you belt him well -- do anything short of kill". When Bill arrives at the station, the tramp kicks his dog, starts a fight and beats Bill senseless. Bill has to recuperate for a week from his injuries, after which he and his sheep move on. It is only later that Stingy Smith comes to realise that he has been duped, and that Bill had arranged it all.

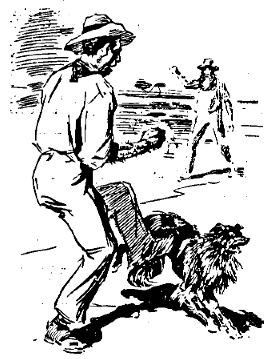
Illustration from original publication of "Saltbush Bill's Second Fight" - The tramp kicks Bill's dog

== Further publications ==
- Rio Grande's Last Race and Other Verses by Banjo Paterson (1902)
- Singer of the Bush, A. B. (Banjo) Paterson : Complete Works 1885-1900 edited by Rosamund Campbell and Philippa Harvie (1983)
- A Vision Splendid : The Complete Poetry of A. B. 'Banjo' Paterson (1990)
- The Collected Verse of Banjo Paterson (1992)

== See also ==
- 1897 in poetry
- 1897 in literature
- 1897 in Australian literature
- Australian literature
