= Saltbush Bill on the Patriarchs =

Poem by Banjo Paterson

Saltbush Bill on the Patriarchs is a humorous poem by Australian writer and poet Andrew Barton "Banjo" Paterson. It was first published in The Evening News on 19 December 1903.

Saltbush Bill was one of Paterson's best known characters who appeared in 5 poems: "Saltbush Bill" (1894), "Saltbush Bill's Second Fight" (1897), "Saltbush Bill's Gamecock" (1898), "Saltbush Bill on the Patriarchs" (1903), and "Saltbush Bill, J.P." (1905).

== Plot summary ==
Saltbush Bill tells the story of a successful sheep farmer using the biblical story of Isaac and Jacob as a metaphor.

== Further publications ==
- Saltbush Bill, J.P., and Other Verses by Banjo Paterson (1917)
- The Drovers edited by Keith Willey (1982)
- Song of the Pen, A. B. (Banjo) Paterson : Complete Works 1901-1941 edited by Rosamund Campbell and Philippa Harvie (1983)
- A Vision Splendid : The Complete Poetry of A. B. 'Banjo' Paterson (1990)
- The Collected Verse of Banjo Paterson (1992)

== See also ==
- 1903 in poetry
- 1903 in literature
- 1903 in Australian literature
- Australian literature
