= James Tyson =

Australian politician

The Hon James Tyson
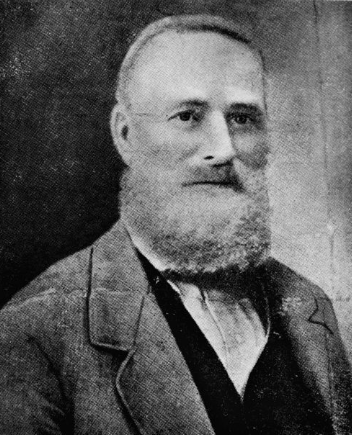
- Tyson in 1890

Member of the Queensland Legislative Council
- In office 23 May 1893 – 4 December 1898

Personal details
- Born: 8 April 1819 Cowpastures, New South Wales, Australia
- Died: 4 December 1898 (aged 79) Darling Downs, Queensland, Australia
- Resting place: Toowoomba Cemetery
- Occupation: Pastoralist
- Known for: Australia's first self-made millionaire

James Tyson (8 April 1819 – 4 December 1898) was an Australian pastoralist. He is regarded as Australia's first self-made millionaire. His name became a byword for reticence, wealth and astute dealing.

== Early life ==
James Tyson was born about 1820 in the Camden district (then called Cowpastures) of New South Wales, the son of William Tyson and Isabella Marie (née Coulsen). There is disagreement over the date of his birth. Some sources say 11 April 1823 while others say 8 April 1819. At his death in 1898, he was described as being either 75 years of age or 81 years of age, suggesting an even wider range of possible birth dates.

His mother, Isabella, was a convict, sentenced to transportation for theft. His father, William, and his eldest brother, also William, came with her. Receiving a grant from Governor Lachlan Macquarie in the Narellan area, the Tysons set themselves up as small farmers, later moving with their growing family to East Bargo. As a youth James commenced work for neighbours such as Major Thomas Mitchell, and John Buckland who contracted him to take cattle to the north-eastern border area of the colony of Victoria. Then, with his brothers, he took up squatting licences in western New South Wales. Eventually they settled on land at the junction of the Lachlan and Murrumbidgee Rivers, in the reed-beds which had defeated John Oxley's exploration in 1837.

== Business life ==
The legendary Tyson fortune was founded on success in butchering on the Bendigo goldfields.

It was extended by canny buying, knowledge of cattle and of stockroutes, pastoral lending and the judicious selection of enormous leaseholds to provide a chain of supply which stretched from North Queensland to Gippsland and which fed beef to Melbourne, Sydney and Brisbane.

His first property, Royal Bank Station, near Deniliquin was purchased in 1855, followed by Juanbong (along the Murrumbidgee River), then the Heyfield station at Gippsland. Moving into Queensland, he took up Felton station in the Darling Downs area. Going west he also picked up Tinnenburra cattle station which carried 20,000 head of cattle.

In 1866, he purchased a group of pastoral runs: Wooroorooka, Rottenrow, Gordonsheet and Teckulman, all on the Warrego River and its tributary, Cuttaburra Creek.

His other stations included Bangate, Goondublui, Tupra and Mooroonowa in New South Wales; and Glenormiston, Swanvale, Meteor Downs and Albinia Downs, Babbiloora, Carnarvon, Tully, Wyobie, Felton, and Mount Russell in Queensland.

== Link with Flora Shaw ==
Enid Moberly Bell (1947:124–126) recounts a chance meeting between Tyson and Flora Shaw on a long train journey: although vastly different in background, they had "a fundamental agreement on values – indifference to wealth, delight in adventure, satisfaction in work accomplished ..." – see E.M.Bell (1947) Flora Shaw: Lady Lugard, D.B.E. Constable.

== Death ==
Slow of speech, though astute and perceptive, "Jimmy" Tyson habitually dressed like a tradesman or boundary rider, and when he visited his various properties, he did so anonymously, preferring the swagmen's camp and the company of sundowners to the comfort of the manager's homestead.

He died in Darling Downs.on 4 December 1898. He had been ailing for two weeks but refused to see a doctor. His funeral service was held at St James's Church at Toowoomba and he was buried in Toowoomba Cemetery.

At the time of his death his estate was the largest in Australia to that time. However he died unmarried, childless and intestate. His estate was sold off, realising about £2.36 million, which was divided among his closest relatives. In 1901, his remains were exhumed and re-buried in a family vault at St Peter's Anglican Church in Campbelltown, New South Wales.

== Legacy ==
- Banjo Paterson (in T.Y.S.O.N.), Breaker Morant and Will Ogilvie all wrote about him.
- The papers of James Tyson are held by Deniliquin & District Historical Society, National Library of Australia, Queensland State Archives and the State Library of Queensland are of historical significance as the surviving records of the creator of one of Australia's greatest pastoral empires and this country's first millionaire, described as ‘a legend in his own lifetime’, and celebrated on his death by a poem by Banjo Paterson, 'T.Y.S.O.N.' In 2010 James Tyson was inducted into the Queensland Business Leaders Hall of Fame. A digital story was produced to mark the occasion where Tyson Doneley talks about the life of The Hon. James Tyson MLC and his pastoral interests throughout the 19th century. Doneley reads out the Banjo Patterson poem that mentions Tyson and talks about the considerable wealth he accumulated during his lifetime (estimated to be 9 billion AUD in today's terms).

== Awards ==
In 2010, the Hon James Tyson MLC was inducted into the Queensland Business Leaders Hall of Fame, as Australia's first cattle king.
