= Three Elephant Power and Other Stories =

Short story collection by Banjo Paterson

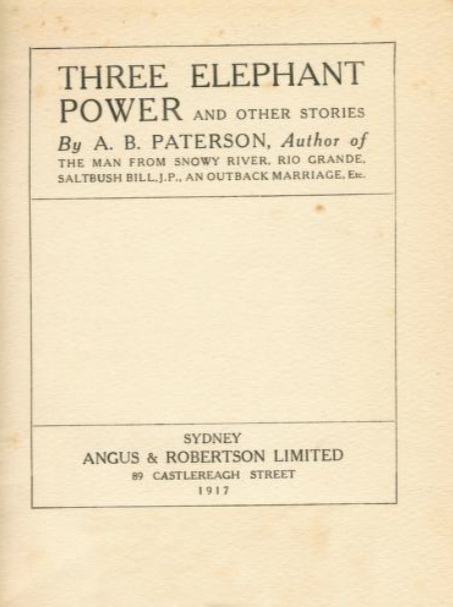
- Title page for Three Elephant Power and Other Stories (1917)
- Author: Banjo Paterson
- Language: English
- Genre: Short story collection
- Publisher: Angus & Robertson
- Publication date: 1917
- Publication place: Australia
- Media type: Print
- Pages: 138 pp.
- Preceded by: Rio Grande's Last Race and Other Verses
- Followed by: Saltbush Bill, J.P., and Other Verses

Three Elephant Power and Other Stories (1917) is a collection of short stories by the Australian writer Banjo Paterson.

== Contents ==
The collection contains 19 stories, of varying lengths, from a number of original sources.

- "Three Elephant Power : A Motor Story"
- "The Oracle in the Private Bar"
- "The Cast-Iron Canvasser"
- "The Trouble with Merinos"
- "The Bullock"
- "White-When-He's-Wanted"
- "The Downfall of Mulligan's"
- "The Amateur Gardener"
- "Dan Fitzgerald Explains"
- "The Cat"
- "Sitting in Judgement : A Show Ring Sketch"
- "The Dog"
- "The Dog - As a Sportsman"
- "Concerning a Steeplechase Rider"
- "Victor Second"
- "Concerning a Dog Fight"
- "His Masterpiece"
- "Done for the Double"
- "Thirsty Island"

== Critical reception ==
In The Richmond River Herald and Northern Districts Advertiser a writer noted: "This collection of stories is racy of the soil, and full of the inimitable 'Banjo's peculiar and effective humor."

A reviewer in the Goulburn Evening Penny Post wrote: "In this collection Paterson has given Australia something superior to anything previously published by him. There isn't a dull yarn from cover to cover, and discernment of character and correctness of detail are shown on practically every page. Paterson instinctively sees the underlying humour of common happenings, and brings it to the surface with the skill of one who understands and can discriminate."

The Oxford Companion to Australian Literature states that the stories "reveal Paterson's capacity for capturing an authentic Australian tone."

== See also ==
- 1917 in Australian literature
