= 1891 in Australian literature =

This article presents a list of the historical events and publications of Australian literature during 1891.

== Books ==
- Jennings Carmichael – Hospital Children: sketches of life and character in the Children's Hospital, Melbourne
- Fergus Hume – Whom God Hath Joined: A Question of Marriage
- Hume Nisbet — The Savage Queen: A Romance of the Natives of Van Dieman's Land

== Short stories ==
- Mary Gaunt – "The Yanyilla Steeplechase"
- Louisa Lawson – "A Bush Experience"
- A. B. Paterson
  - "The Cast-Iron Canvasser"
  - "His Masterpiece"
- Rosa Praed – "The Bunyip"
- Price Warung
  - "John Price's Bar of Steel"
  - "The Liberation of the First Three"

== Poetry ==
- Barcroft Boake
  - "The Digger's Song"
  - "On the Range"
  - "Where the Dead Men Lie"
- Victor J. Daley – "Lachesis"
- George Essex Evans
  - "An Australian Symphony"
  - The Repentance of Magdalene Despar and Other Poems
- Henry Lawson
  - "Freedom on the Wallaby"
  - "My Literary Friend"
  - "The Shame of Going Back"
- Louisa Lawson – "A Dream"
- Harriet Anne Patchett Martin – Coo-ee : Tales of Australian Life by Australian Ladies (edited)
- J. B. O'Hara – Songs of the South
- A. B. Paterson
  - "An Evening in Dandaloo"
  - "The Flying Gang: A Railroad Song"
  - "In the Droving Days"
  - "A Mountain Station"
  - "The Open Steeplechase"

== Births ==
A list, ordered by date of birth (and, if the date is either unspecified or repeated, ordered alphabetically by surname) of births in 1891 of Australian literary figures, authors of written works or literature-related individuals follows, including year of death.

- 13 March — Maie Casey, Baroness Casey, pioneer aviator, poet, librettist, biographer, memoirist and artist (died 1983)
- 9 April – Lesbia Harford, poet (died 1927)

== See also ==
- 1891 in Australia
- 1891 in literature
- 1891 in poetry
- List of years in Australian literature
- List of years in literature
