= Saltbush Bill's Gamecock =

Poem by Banjo Paterson

Saltbush Bill's Gamecock is a humorous poem by Australian writer and poet Andrew Barton "Banjo" Paterson. It was first published in Brooks's Australian Xmas Annual Volume 1 1898.

Saltbush Bill was one of Paterson's best known characters who appeared in 5 poems: "Saltbush Bill" (1894), "Saltbush Bill's Second Fight" (1897), "Saltbush Bill's Gamecock" (1898), "Saltbush Bill on the Patriarchs" (1903), and "Saltbush Bill, J.P." (1905).

== Plot summary ==
Saltbush Bill is again droving his sheep when he happens "on Take 'Em Down, the station of Rooster Hall." Rooster Hall is a follower of cockfighting and Bill challenges him to a contest: his Australian bird against Hall's, a "clipt and a shaven cock, the pride of his English Game". But Bill has a trick up his sleeve and wins the contest by forfeit.

== Further publications ==
- Rio Grande's Last Race and Other Verses by Banjo Paterson (1902)
- Singer of the Bush, A. B. (Banjo) Paterson : Complete Works 1885-1900 edited by Rosamund Campbell and Philippa Harvie (1983)
- A Vision Splendid : The Complete Poetry of A. B. 'Banjo' Paterson (1990)

== See also ==
- 1898 in poetry
- 1898 in literature
- 1898 in Australian literature
- Australian literature
