= Saltbush Bill, J.P. =

Poem by Banjo Paterson

Saltbush Bill, J.P. is a humorous poem by Australian writer and poet Andrew Barton "Banjo" Paterson. It was first published in The Evening News on 16 December 1905.

Saltbush Bill was one of Paterson's best known characters who appeared in 5 poems: "Saltbush Bill" (1894), "Saltbush Bill's Second Fight" (1897), "Saltbush Bill's Gamecock" (1898), "Saltbush Bill on the Patriarchs" (1903), and "Saltbush Bill, J.P." (1905).

== Plot summary ==
After a long life of droving Saltbush Bill is appointed a J.P. (Justice of the Peace). But he is disappointed to find no mention of pay until he discovers, in his contract, the line "A magistrate may charge a pound/For inquest on a fire." Bill and the local indigenous population collude to make good use of this provision.

== Further publications ==
- Saltbush Bill, J.P., and Other Verses by Banjo Paterson (1917)
- Along the Western Road : Bush Stories and Ballads (1981)
- Song of the Pen, A. B. (Banjo) Paterson : Complete Works 1901-1941 edited by Rosamund Campbell and Philippa Harvie (1983)
- A Vision Splendid : The Complete Poetry of A. B. 'Banjo' Paterson (1990)
- The Collected Verse of Banjo Paterson (1992)

== See also ==
- 1905 in poetry
- 1905 in literature
- 1905 in Australian literature
- Australian literature
