= The Man from Snowy River and Other Verses =

1895 poetry collection by Banjo Paterson

- 1967 edition (publ. Jacaranda Press)
- Author: Banjo Paterson
- Language: English
- Genre: Bush poetry
- Publisher: Angus and Robertson
- Publication date: 1895
- Publication place: Australia
- Media type: Print (hardback & paperback)
- Pages: 184
- Followed by: Rio Grande's Last Race and Other Verses

The Man from Snowy River and Other Verses (1895) is the first collection of poems by Australian poet Banjo Paterson. It was released in hardback by Angus and Robertson in 1895, and features the poet's widely anthologised poems "The Man from Snowy River", "Clancy of the Overflow", "Saltbush Bill" and "The Man from Ironbark". It also contains the poet's first two poems that featured in The Bulletin Debate, a famous dispute in The Bulletin magazine from 1892 to 1893 between Paterson and Henry Lawson.

The collection includes 48 poems by the author that are reprinted from various sources, along with a preface by Rolf Boldrewood, who defined the collection as "the best bush ballads written since the death of Lindsay Gordon".

== Contents ==
- "The Man from Snowy River"
- "Old Pardon, the Son of Reprieve : A Racing Rhyme"
- "Clancy of the Overflow"
- "Conroy's Gap"
- "Our New Horse : A Racing Rhyme"
- "An Idyll of Dandaloo"
- "The Geebung Polo Club"
- "The Travelling Post Office"
- "Saltbush Bill"
- "A Mountain Station"
- "Been There Before"
- "The Man Who Was Away"
- "The Man from Ironbark"
- "The Open Steeplechase"
- "The Amateur Rider"
- "On Kiley's Run"
- "Frying Pan's Theology"
- "The Two Devines"
- "In the Droving Days"
- "Lost"
- "Over the Range"
- "Only a Jockey"
- "How McGinness Went Missing"
- "A Voice from the Town"
- "A Bunch of Roses"
- "Black Swans"
- "The All Right 'Un"
- "The Boss of the 'Admiral Lynch'"
- "A Bushman's Song"
- "How Gilbert Died"
- "The Flying Gang : A Railroad Song"
- "Shearing at Castlereagh"
- "The Wind's Message"
- "Johnson's Antidote"
- "Ambition and Art : Art"
- "Ambition and Art : Ambition"
- "The Daylight is Dying"
- "In Defence of the Bush"
- "Last Week"
- "Those Names"
- "A Bush Christening"
- "How the Favourite Beat Us"
- "The Great Calamity"
- "Come-By-Chance"
- "Under the Shadow of Kiley's Hill"
- "Jim Carew"
- "The Swagman's Rest"
- "Prelude"

== Critical reception ==
On its original publication in Australia The Sydney Morning Herald saw semblances of Rudyard Kipling's collection Barrack-Room Ballads, but agreed with Boldrewood that the major influence on the poems was the work of Adam Lindsay Gordon.

The Adelaide Chronicle summed up the collection with the description: "There flits before us a wild phantasmagoria of break-neck steeplechases, conflicts of police and outlaws, hairbreadth escapes, and marvellous examples of bush, prowess, courage, and skill."

The Oxford Companion to Australian Literature declared it "the most successful volume of poetry ever published in Australia".

== See also ==
- 1890 in Australian literature
- 1895 in Australian literature
- 1890 in poetry
- 1895 in poetry
