= The Man from Ironbark =

1892 poem by Banjo Paterson

"The Man From Ironbark"
- by A. B. Paterson
- Written: 1892
- First published in: The Bulletin
- Country: Australia
- Language: English
- Publication date: 17 December 1892

Full text
- The Man From Ironbark at Wikisource

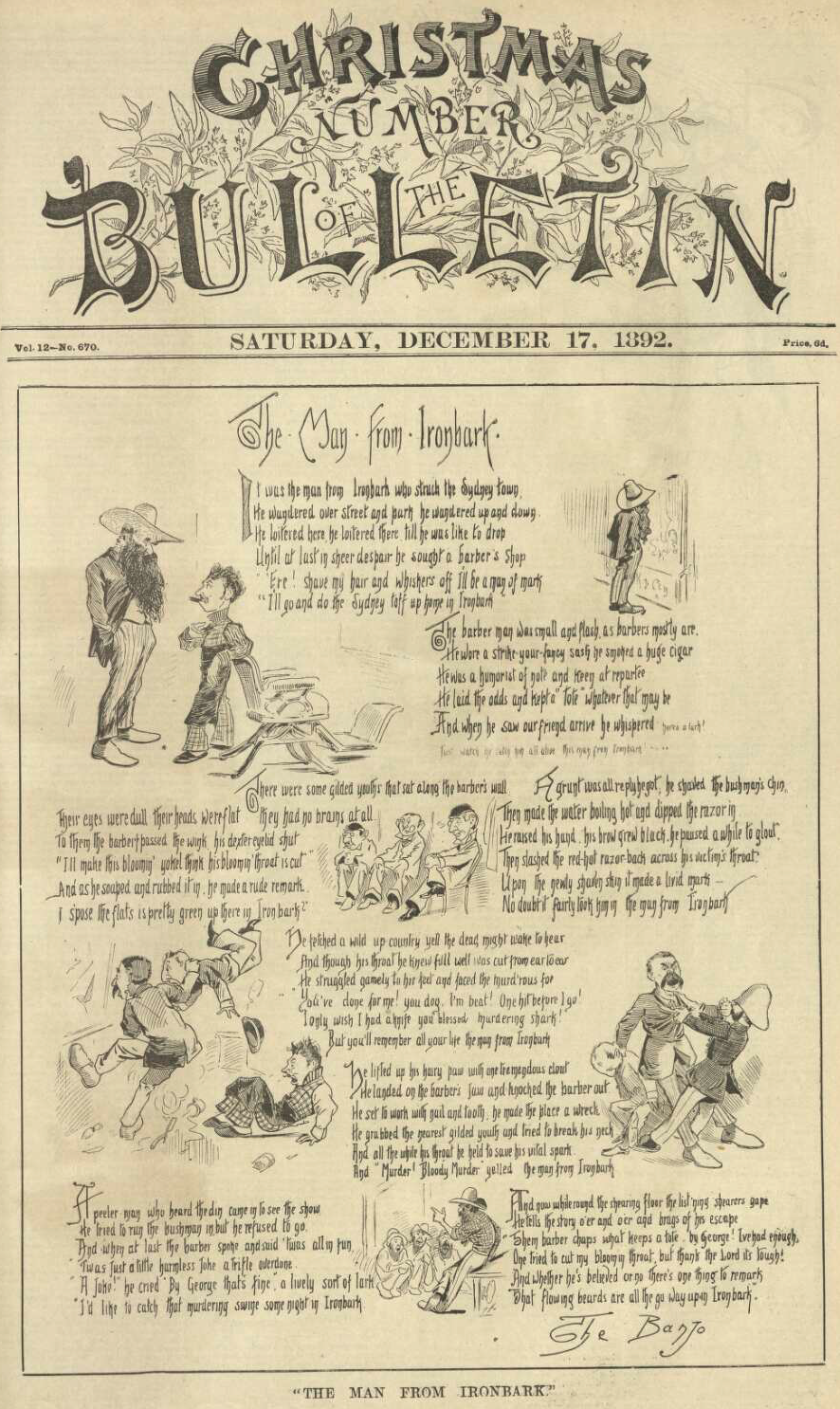
The Bulletin, 17 December 1892.

"The Man From Ironbark" is a poem by Australian bush poet Banjo Paterson (Andrew Barton Paterson). It is written in the iambic heptameter.

It was first published in The Bulletin on 17 December 1892.

== Analysis ==
The poem relates the experiences of a man from the Bush who visits Sydney and becomes the subject of a practical joke by a mischievous barber.

Playing to his audience of jeunesse dorée — "There were some gilded youths that sat along the barber's wall,/Their eyes were dull, their heads were flat, they had no brains at all" — the barber pretends to cut the bushman's throat by slashing his newly-shaven neck using the back of his cut-throat razor that had been heated in boiling water. While making his displeasure known,

A peeler man [i.e. policeman] who heard the din came in to see the show;
He tried to run the bushman in, but he refused to go.

The barber confesses that he was playing a joke, and the bushman, unconvinced, returns to Ironbark, where, due to his accounts of his Sydney experiences, "flowing beards are all the go".

There are obvious echoes in the poem of the urban legend of the murdering barber - fictionalised in the penny dreadful The String of Pearls which featured the notorious Sweeney Todd.

Ironbark was the earlier name for Stuart Town, a town in the Central West region of New South Wales.

In 2004, a representative of The Wilderness Society posed as "The Ghost of the Man from Ironbark", a reference to the poem, to campaign for the protection of the remaining Ironbark woodlands in New South Wales and Queensland.

== Critical reception ==
A writer in The Herald from Melbourne noted, after Paterson's death, that the poem "will remain a gem to the Outback as long as the Outback exists."

The Oxford Companion to Australian Literature states: "In ironbark the oft-told story reinforces traditional bush suspicion of the city and leads to a pronounced fashion in beards."

== Publication history ==
After its original publication in The Bulletin the poem was also included in the following anthologies, among others:

- The Man from Snowy River and Other Verses, 1895.
- Favourite Australian Poems edited by Ian Mudie, Rigby, 1963.
- From the Ballads to Brennan edited by T. Inglis Moore, Angus & Robertson, 1964.
- Silence into Song : An Anthology of Australian Verse edited by Clifford O'Brien, Rigby, 1968.
- A Treasury of Colonial Poetry, Currawong, 1982.
- Singer of the Bush, A. B. (Banjo) Paterson : Complete Works 1885-1900 edited by Rosamund Campbell and Philippa Harvie, 1983.
- The Penguin Book of Humorous Verse edited by Bill Scott, Penguin, 1984.
- The Illustrated Treasury of Australian Verse edited by Beatrice Davis, Nelson, 1984.
- My Country : Australian Poetry and Short Stories, Two Hundred Years edited by Leonie Kramer, Lansdowne, 1985.
- The Bushwackers Australian Song Book edited by Jan Wositzky and Dobe Newton, Sphere, 1988.
- A Vision Splendid: The Complete Poetry of A. B. 'Banjo' Paterson, Angus and Robertson, 1990.
- A Treasury of Bush Verse edited by G. A. Wilkes, Angus and Robertson, 1991
- The Penguin Book of Australian Ballads edited by Elizabeth Webby and Philip Butterss, Penguin, 1993.
- Classic Australian Verse edited by Maggie Pinkney, Five Mile Press, 2001.
- Our Country : Classic Australian Poetry : From Colonial Ballads to Paterson & Lawson edited by Michael Cook, Little Hills Press, 2002.
- 100 Australian Poems You Need to Know edited by Jamie Grant, Hardie Grant, 2008.
- The Penguin Anthology of Australian Poetry edited by John Kinsella, Penguin, 2009.

== See also ==
- "The Man from Ironbark" – full text of the book The Man from Snowy River and Other Verses (including the poem "The Man from Ironbark") on Project Gutenberg Australia
- 1892 in Australian literature
