= Conroy's Gap =

1890 poem by Banjo Paterson

- by A. B. Paterson
- Written: 1890
- First published in: The Bulletin
- Country: Australia
- Language: English
- Published in English: 20 December 1890

Full text
- Conroy's Gap at Wikisource

"Conroy's Gap" is a poem by Australian bush poet Banjo Paterson (Andrew Barton Paterson).

It was first published in The Bulletin on 20 December 1890, as by "The Banjo", under the title "The Story of Conroy's Gap", and subsequently reprinted in the author's poetry collections and other poetry anthologies.

== Critical reception ==
In a review of the poet's collection The Man from Snowy River and Other Verses a reviewer in The Argus (Melbourne) noted: "The swing of the verse is as various as the pace of a horse–now ambling along in an easy, careless measure, now breaking into a rough trot, and presently springing into full gallop, with a long stride, and a rhythmical recurrence of the rapid hoof-beats on the ringing around. And the general effect of the free and animated movement of the verse is thoroughly exhilarating, as in [this poem, among others], where the metre suits well with the hurry and excitement of the narrative."

== Publication history ==
After its original publication in The Bulletin the poem was later reprinted as follows:

- The Man from Snowy River and Other Verses, Angus and Robertson, 1895
- The Collected Verse of Banjo Paterson edited by Clement Semmler, Viking O'Neill, 1982
- Singer of the Bush, A. B. (Banjo) Paterson : Complete Works 1885-1900 edited by Rosamund Campbell and Philippa Harvie, Lansdowne, 1983
- My Country : Australian Poetry and Short Stories, Two Hundred Years edited by Leonie Kramer, Lansdowne, 1985
- A Vision Splendid: The Complete Poetry of A. B. 'Banjo' Paterson, Angus and Robertson, 1990
- Selected Poems : A. B. Paterson edited by Les Murray, 1992
- A. B. (Banjo) Paterson : Bush Ballads, Poems, Stories and Journalism edited by Clement Semmler, University of Queensland Press, 1992
- Banjo Paterson : His Poetry and Prose edited by Richard Hall, Allen & Unwin, 1993
- The Collected Verse of A. B. Paterson : Containing 'The Man from Snowy River', 'Rio Grande' and 'Saltbush Bill, M.P.', 1921
- The Penguin Book of Australian Ballads edited by Elizabeth Webby and Philip Butterss, Penguin, 1993

== Notes ==
- Conroy's Gap, and Conroy's sheep, would later be mentioned by Paterson in his 1894 poem "The Travelling Post Office", and also in his 1896 poem "Mulga Bill's Bicycle"

== See also ==
- 1890 in Australian literature
