= Saltbush Bill =

1894 poem by Banjo Paterson

- by Banjo Paterson
- Written: 1894
- First published in: The Bulletin
- Country: Australia
- Language: English
- Publication date: 15 December 1894

Full text
- Saltbush Bill at Wikisource

Saltbush Bill is a humorous poem by Australian writer and poet Andrew Barton "Banjo" Paterson. It was first published in The Bulletin magazine on 15 December 1894, the Christmas issue of that publication.

Saltbush Bill was one of Paterson's best known characters who appeared in 5 poems: "Saltbush Bill" (1894), "Saltbush Bill's Second Fight" (1897), "Saltbush Bill's Gamecock" (1898), "Saltbush Bill on the Patriarchs" (1903), and "Saltbush Bill, J.P." (1905).

== Plot summary ==
The character is introduced in this poem as a drover of sheep along "the track of the Overland", who stretches "the law of the Great Stock Routes" by allowing his sheep to make use of all the good grass they find. On the occasion described in the poem, Bill's sheep have spread across a squatter's property. A Jackaroo arrives and attempts to drive the sheep back into the accepted "space of the half-mile track". An argument and then fight ensues between Bill and the Jackaroo, and, while Bill concedes after a marathon fight, in the end he achieves his aim of finding his sheep a good feed.

== Further publications ==
- The Man from Snowy River and Other Verses by Banjo Paterson (1895)
- Favourite Australian Poems edited by Ian Mudie, Rigby, 1963
- The Penguin Book of Australian Verse edited by Harry Heseltine, Penguin Books, 1972
- A Treasury of Colonial Poetry, Currawong, 1982
- Singer of the Bush, A. B. (Banjo) Paterson : Complete Works 1885-1900 edited by Rosamund Campbell and Philippa Harvie, 1983
- A Vision Splendid: The Complete Poetry of A. B. 'Banjo' Paterson, Angus and Robertson, 1990
- A Treasury of Bush Verse edited by G. A. Wilkes, Angus and Robertson, 1991
- The Penguin Book of Australian Ballads edited by Elizabeth Webby and Philip Butterss, Penguin, 1993

== See also ==
- 1894 in poetry
- 1894 in literature
- 1894 in Australian literature
- Australian literature
