= The Daylight is Dying =

1890 poem by Banjo Paterson

- by A. B. Paterson
- Written: 1890
- First published in: The Australasian
- Country: Australia
- Language: English
- Published in English: 27 December 1890
- Lines: 52

Full text
- The Daylight is Dying at Wikisource

"The Daylight is Dying" is a poem by Australian bush poet Banjo Paterson (Andrew Barton Paterson).

It was first published in The Australasian on 27 December 1890, as by "Andrew Barton", and subsequently reprinted in the author's poetry collections and other poetry anthologies.

== Critical reception ==
In an overview of poetry from New South Wales, critic D. J. Quinn noted of the poet: "Though Mr. Paterson owes his popularity in large measure to the stirring character of his ballads, which are nothing if not racy of the soil, he has restful moods, in which the lyrical quality of his muse shows to excellent advantage." He then quoted from this poem by way of example.

A reviewer for The Western Argus (Kalgoorlie) suggested this poem as one that should be read in schools, noting that the poem "provides a fine conception of the effect that harmony with the bush life will have upon our depiction of it."

== Publication history ==
After its original publication in The Australasian the poem was later reprinted as follows:

- The Man from Snowy River and Other Verses, Angus and Robertson, 1895
- An Anthology of Australian Verse edited by Bertram Stevens, Angus and Robertson, 1907
- The Golden Treasury of Australian Verse edited by Bertram Stevens, Angus and Robertson, 1909
- The Children's Treasury of Australian Verse edited by Bertram Stevens and George Mackaness, Angus and Robertson, 1913
- The Collected Verse of A. B. Paterson : Containing 'The Man from Snowy River', 'Rio Grande' and 'Saltbush Bill, M.P.' , 1921
- Selections from Australian Poets edited by Bertram Stephens and George Mackaness, Cornstalk Publishing, 1925
- Poets of Australia : An Anthology of Australian Verse edited by George Mackaness, Angus & Robertson, 1946
- An Anthology of Australian Verse edited by George Mackaness, Angus & Robertson, 1952
- Singer of the Bush, A. B. (Banjo) Paterson : Complete Works 1885-1900 edited by Rosamund Campbell and Philippa Harvie, Lansdowne, 1983
- Banjo Paterson's Poems of the Bush, J. M. Dent, 1987
- A Vision Splendid: The Complete Poetry of A. B. 'Banjo' Paterson, Angus and Robertson, 1990
- Banjo Paterson : His Poetry and Prose edited by Richard Hall, Allen & Unwin, 1993
- The Collected Verse of Banjo Paterson edited by Clement Semmler, Viking O'Neill, 1993
- The Bush Poems of A. B. (Banjo) Paterson edited by Jack Thompson, FinePoets, 2008

== See also ==
- 1890 in Australian literature
