= On Kiley's Run =

1890 poem by Banjo Paterson

- by A. B. Paterson
- Written: 1890
- First published in: The Bulletin
- Country: Australia
- Language: English
- Published in English: 20 December 1890
- Lines: 112

Full text
- On Kiley's Run at Wikisource

"On Kiley's Run" is a poem by Australian bush poet Banjo Paterson (Andrew Barton Paterson).

It was first published in The Bulletin on 20 December 1890, as by "The Banjo", and subsequently reprinted in the author's poetry collections and other poetry anthologies.

== Critical reception ==
While reviewing the poet's collection The Man from Snowy River and Other Verses a reviewer in The Sydney Morning Herald noted that in poem's such as this "one finds the authentic transcript of the moods of inland Australia, the life of her people, and sometimes in their own words."

In a review of the same volume in The Daily Telegraph (Sydney) the writer commented that Paterson "has a mastery over his subject which always appears. He knows the way of the shearer, the drover, the fine old type of squatter who once prospered 'on Kiley's run,' and the new type who now administers the same property in the interests of some financial institution, and chills the whole district as an exemplar of hard-faced economy."

In a lecture titled The Beginnings of an Australian Literature, delivered at South Place Institute in London in 1898, Arthur Patchett Martin stated that "Paterson's poem, 'On Kiley's Run,' is the most thoroughly Australian set of verses I know; and those verses have a beauty and pathos of their own, infinitely surpassing the best suburban imitations of Wordsworth and Tennyson. For in Literature, as in Life, nothing is easier than to imitate–to follow some one else's lead–nothing so difficult as to originate."

== Publication history ==
After its original publication in The Bulletin the poem was later reprinted as follows:

- The Man from Snowy River and Other Verses, Angus and Robertson, 1895
- The Oxford Book of Australasian Verse edited by Walter Murdoch, Oxford University Press, 1924
- Freedom on the Wallaby : Poems of the Australian People edited by Marjorie Pizer, Pinchgut Press, 1953
- The Collected Verse of Banjo Paterson edited by Clement Semmler, Viking O'Neill, 1982
- Singer of the Bush, A. B. (Banjo) Paterson : Complete Works 1885-1900 edited by Rosamund Campbell and Philippa Harvie, Lansdowne, 1983
- Banjo Paterson's Poems of the Bush, J. M. Dent, 1987
- The Banjo's Best-Loved Poems edited by edited by Rosamund Campbell and Philippa Harvie, Weldon Publishing, 1985
- A Vision Splendid: The Complete Poetry of A. B. 'Banjo' Paterson, Angus and Robertson, 1990
- A. B. (Banjo) Paterson : Bush Ballads, Poems, Stories and Journalism edited by Clement Semmler, University of Queensland Press, 1992
- Selected Poems : A. B. Paterson edited by Les Murray, 1992
- Banjo Paterson : His Poetry and Prose edited by Richard Hall, Allen & Unwin, 1993
- The Penguin Book of Australian Ballads edited by Elizabeth Webby and Philip Butterss, Penguin, 1993
- Classic Australian Verse edited by Maggie Pinkney, Five Mile Press, 2001
- Banjo Paterson Treasury by A. B. Paterson, Random House, 2013

== See also ==
- 1890 in Australian literature
