= Saltbush Bill, J.P., and Other Verses =

Poetry collection by Banjo Paterson

- First edition
- Author: Banjo Paterson
- Language: English
- Genre: Bush poetry
- Publisher: Angus and Robertson
- Publication date: 1917
- Publication place: Australia
- Media type: Print (hardback & paperback)
- Pages: 137
- Preceded by: Three Elephant Power and Other Stories
- Followed by: The Animals Noah Forgot

Saltbush Bill, J.P., and Other Verses (1917) is the third collection of poems by Australian poet Banjo Paterson. It was released in hardback by Angus and Robertson in 1917, and features the poems "Waltzing Matilda", "Saltbush Bill, J.P.", "An Answer to Various Bards" and "T.Y.S.O.N.".

The original collection includes 43 poems by the author that are reprinted from various sources. The book formed part of the publisher's series of "Pocket Editions for the Trenches", designed to fit a serviceman's coat pocket.

== Contents ==
- "Song of the Pen"
- "Song of the Wheat"
- "Brumby's Run"
- "Saltbush Bill on the Patriarchs"
- "The Reverend Mullineux"
- "The Wisdom of Hafiz"
- "Saltbush Bill, J.P."
- "The Riders in the Stand"
- "Waltzing Matilda"
- "An Answer to Various Bards"
- "T.Y.S.O.N."
- "As Long as your Eyes are Blue"
- "Bottle-O!"
- "The Story of Mongrel Grey"
- "Gilhooley's Estate"
- "The Road to Hogan's Gap"
- "A Singer of the Bush"
- ""Shouting" for a Camel"
- "The Lost Drink"
- "Mulligan's Mare"
- "The Matrimonial Stakes"
- "The Mountain Squatter"
- "Pioneers"
- "Santa Claus in the Bush"
- ""In re a Gentleman, One""
- "The Melting of the Snow"
- "A Dream of the Melbourne Cup"
- "The Gundaroo Bullock"
- "Lay of the Motor-Car"
- "The Corner Man"
- "When Dacey Rode the Mule"
- "The Mylora Elopement"
- "The Pannikin Poet"
- "Not on It"
- "The Protest"
- "The Scapegoat"
- "An Evening in Dandaloo"
- "A Ballad of Ducks"
- "Tommy Corrigan"
- "The Maori's Wool"
- "The Angel's Kiss"
- "Sunrise on the Coast"
- "The Reveille"

== Critical reception ==
On its original publication in Australia The Sunday Times noted "As to the contests of Saltbush Bill, J.P., it is to be regretted that Banjo himself was not responsible for the selection, as he would certainly have omitted quite a number of verses — fugitive lines, poor jokes in rhyme, and inconsequentialities that, although well enough in the columns of a newspaper, would be better out of a volume." The Australian Worker was similarly unimpressed: "A man with the reputation made by The Man from Snowy River and Rio Grande's Last Race has a very high standard to maintain, and, so far as this latest volume is concerned, it cannot be said that Paterson has maintained it."

== See also ==
- 1917 in Australian literature
- 1917 in poetry
