= The Cast-Iron Canvasser =

Short story by A. B. "Banjo" Paterson

- Short story by Banjo Paterson
- Country: Australia
- Language: English
- Genre: Humour

Publication
- Published in: The Bulletin
- Publication type: Periodical
- Media type: Print
- Publication date: 19 December 1891

"The Cast-Iron Canvasser" is a humorous short story by Banjo Paterson. It was first published in the 19 December 1891 issue of The Bulletin, and later included in the author's short story collection, Three Elephant Power and Other Stories, and in many short story anthologies.

== Plot summary ==
It tells of a mechanical book-seller, built to overcome the treatment given to travelling salesmen by residents of the outback, which attempts to sell an atlas to a giant Scot named MacPherson.

== Further publications ==
- Three Elephant Power and Other Stories by Banjo Paterson (1917)
- The Herald, 17 May 1934
- Short Stories of Australia : The Lawson Tradition edited by Douglas Stewart (1967)
- Best Australian Short Stories edited by Douglas Stewart and Beatrice Davis (1971)
- Banjo Paterson : Short Stories by Banjo Paterson (1980)
- The Bulletin, 29 January 1980
- Futuristic Tales, December 1980
- The Bulletin, 22–29 December 1981
- Singer of the Bush, A. B. (Banjo) Paterson : Complete Works 1885–1900 edited by Rosamund Campbell and Philippa Harvie (1983)
- My Country : Australian Poetry and Short Stories, Two Hundred Years edited by Leonie Kramer (1985)
- The Bulletin, 31 December 1985
- A. B. 'Banjo' Paterson : Bush Ballads, Poems, Short Stories and Journalism edited by Clement Semmler (1992)

The story was also translated into German in 1984.

== Critical reception ==
A reviewer in The Sydney Morning Herald said it is a "broadly farcial" story "in which the fun waxes fast and furious, and even where the comedy is less uproarious the author indulges his vein of quiet humour very effectively."

In The Canberra Times Maurice Dunlevy called the story "not only one of the best examples in our literature of that familiar form of the tall tale, the remarkable invention story, but is also one of Paterson's best remembered."

== Notes ==
The depiction of the mechanical book-seller has led some critics to label this as story as an early example of steampunk.

== See also ==
- 1891 in Australian literature
