= Freedom on the Wallaby =

1891 poem by Australian writer Henry Lawson

- by Henry Lawson
- Written: 1891
- First published in: The Worker
- Country: Australia
- Language: English
- Publication date: 16 May 1891

Full text
- Freedom on the Wallaby at Wikisource

"Freedom on the Wallaby", Henry Lawson's well known poem, was written as a comment on the 1891 Australian shearers' strike and published by William Lane in The Worker in Brisbane, 16 May 1891.

The last two stanzas of the poem were read out by Frederick Brentnall MP on 15 July 1891 in the Queensland Legislative Council during a 'Vote of Thanks' to the armed police who broke up the Barcaldine strike camp. There were calls in the chamber for Lawson's arrest for sedition. Lawson wrote a bitter rejoinder to Brentnall, The Vote of Thanks Debate.

The "Rebel flag" referred to in the poem is the Eureka Flag that was first raised at the Eureka Stockade in 1854, above the Shearers' strike camp in 1891 and carried on the first Australian May Day march in Barcaldine on 1 May 1891.

== Publication history ==
After the poem's initial publication in The Worker it was reprinted in that newspaper on 29 September 1894, and then included in the following anthologies and collections:

- Freedom on the Wallaby : Poems of the Australian People edited by Marjorie Pizer, Pinchgut Press, 1953
- The Penguin Australian Song Book edited by J. S. Manifold, 1964
- The Essential Henry Lawson : The Best Works of Australia's Greatest Writer edited Brian Kiernan, Currey O'Neil, 1982
- A Campfire Yarn : Henry Lawson Complete Works 1885-1900 edited by Leonard Cronin, Lansdowne, 1984
- A Treasury of Bush Verse edited by G. A. Wilkes, Angus and Robertson, 1991
- The Penguin Book of Australian Ballads edited by Elizabeth Webby and Philip Butterss, Penguin, 1993
- Our Country : Classic Australian Poetry : From Colonial Ballads to Paterson & Lawson edited by Michael Cook, Little Hills Press, 2002
- 60 Classic Australian Poems for Children edited by Chris Cheng, Random House, 2009

== See also ==
- 1891 in Australian literature
