= The Song of Old Joe Swallow =

Poem by Australian writer Henry Lawson

- by Henry Lawson
- Written: 1890
- First published in: The Bulletin
- Country: Australia
- Language: English
- Preceded by: The Third Murder : A New South Wales tale
- Followed by: Skeleton Flat

Full text
- The Song of Old Joe Swallow at Wikisource

"The Song of Old Joe Swallow" (1890) is a poem by Australian poet Henry Lawson.

It was originally published in The Bulletin on 24 May 1890 and subsequently reprinted in several of the author's other collections, other newspapers and periodicals and a number of Australian poetry anthologies.

== Critical reception ==
Writing in The Australian Town and Country Journal about the author's collection, In the Days When the World was Wide and Other Verses, a reviewer noted that this poem has "a swinging, haunting refrain, a melodious simplicity and pathos which rival his contemporary on the other side of the globe, Rudyard Kipling."

== Publication history ==
After the poem's initial publication in The Bulletin it was reprinted as follows:

- In the Days When the World was Wide and Other Verses by Henry Lawson, Angus and Robertson, 1900
- Humorous Verses by Henry Lawson, Angus and Robertson, 1941
- The Penguin Book of Australian Verse edited by Harry Heseltine, Penguin Books, 1972
- Poems of Henry Lawson edited by Walter Stone, Ure Smith, 1973
- A Campfire Yarn : Henry Lawson Complete Works 1885-1900 edited by Leonard Cronin, Lansdowne, 1984
- A Collection of Australian Bush Verse Peter Antill-Rose, 1989
- Our Country : Classic Australian Poetry : From Colonial Ballads to Paterson & Lawson edited by Michael Cook, Little Hills Press, 2002

== Note ==
Henry Lawson used the name "Joe Swallow" as a pseudonym under which he published two poems: "The Water-Lilies" in 1891, and "A Stranger on the Darling" in 1892.

== See also ==
- 1890 in Australian literature
- 1890 in poetry
