= Black Swans (poem) =

1893 poem by Banjo Paterson

- by A. B. Paterson
- Written: 1893
- First published in: The Sydney Mail
- Country: Australia
- Language: English
- Publication date: 22 July 1893
- Lines: 64

Full text
- Black Swans at Wikisource

"Black Swans" is a poem by Australian bush poet Banjo Paterson (Andrew Barton Paterson).

It was first published in The Sydney Mail on 22 July 1893, as by "A. B. P", and subsequently reprinted in the author's poetry collections and other poetry anthologies.

== Critical reception ==
In reviewing the poet's collection The Man from Snowy River and Other Verses a reviewer in The Daily Telegraph (Sydney) noted that while Paterson is best known for his poems of men of the bush he is also capable of producing "reflective and imaginative poems", such as this one.

Reviewing the same volume The Australian Town and Country Journal called the poem "one of the best that Mr. Paterson gives us", and The Sydney Mail wrote that in this poem, among others, "one finds the authentic transcript of the moods of inland Australia, the life of her people, and some times in their own words."

== Publication history ==
After its original publication in The Sydney Mail the poem was later reprinted as follows:

- The Man from Snowy River and Other Verses, by A. B. Paterson, Angus and Robertson, 1895
- An Anthology of Australian Verse edited by Bertram Stevens, Angus and Robertson, 1907
- The Golden Treasury of Australian Verse edited by Bertram Stevens, Angus and Robertson, 1909
- Silence Into Song : An Anthology of Australian Verse edited by Clifford O'Brien, Rigby, 1968
- The Collected Verse of A. B. Paterson : Containing 'The Man from Snowy River', 'Rio Grande' and 'Saltbush Bill, M.P.', Angus and Robertson, 1982
- Singer of the Bush, A. B. (Banjo) Paterson : Complete Works 1885-1900 edited by Rosamund Campbell and Philippa Harvie, Lansdowne, 1983
- Cross-Country : A Book of Australian Verse edited by John Barnes and Brian MacFarlane, Heinemann, 1984
- Banjo Paterson’s Poems of the Bush, J. M. Dent, 1987
- A Vision Splendid: The Complete Poetry of A. B. 'Banjo' Paterson, Angus and Robertson, 1990
- A. B. (Banjo) Paterson : Bush Ballads, Poems, Stories and Journalism edited by Clement Semmler, University of Queensland Press, 1992
- Banjo Paterson : His Poetry and Prose edited by Richard Hall, Allen & Unwin, 1993
- The Collected Verse of Banjo Paterson edited by Clement Semmler, Viking O'Neill, 1993
- Banjo Paterson Treasury by A. B. Paterson, Random House, 2013

== See also ==
- 1893 in Australian literature
