= In the Droving Days =

1891 poem by Australian poet Andrew Barton Paterson

- by Banjo Paterson
- Written: 1891
- First published in: The Bulletin
- Country: Australia
- Language: English
- Lines: 116

Full text
- In the Droving Days at Wikisource

"In the Droving Days" (1891) is a poem by Australian poet Banjo Paterson.

It was originally published in The Bulletin magazine on 20 June 1891 and was subsequently reprinted in a number of Australian poetry anthologies.

== Synopsis ==
An auctioneer is attemtping to sell a "drover's horse" for "Only a pound". A bystander, watching the auction, is transported back in his imagination to his earlier life in the droving days, and so puts in a bid and buys the horse. But he doesn't dare ride it as it is too old and lets it wander "fat and sleek" at pasture.

== Critical reception ==
A writer in The Journal (Adelaide), when writing of the lure of the outback, asked "What real Australian could resist the appeal so eloquently put in the lines of Banjo Patercon's 'In the Droving Days'". They continued by noting that the "spirit of the real Australia is contained [in the poem], and what a fund of memories they would bring back to the old pioneer who, in the twilight of life, chanced to peruse them."

== Publication history ==
After the poem's initial publication in The Bulletin magazine it was reprinted as follows:

- The Man from Snowy River and Other Verses, Angus and Robertson, 1895
- The Collected Verse of A. B. Paterson: Containing 'The Man from Snowy River', 'Rio Grande' and 'Saltbush Bill, M.P.' , Angus and Robertson, 1921
- The Bulletin, 23-30 December 1980
- Singer of the Bush, A. B. (Banjo) Paterson: Complete Works 1885-1900 edited by Rosamund Campbell and Philippa Harvie, Lansdowne, 1983
- A. B. Paterson's Off Down the Track: Racing and Other Yarns by A. B. Paterson, edited by Rosamund Campbell and Philippa Harvie, Angus and Robertson, 1986
- A Vision Splendid: The Complete Poetry of A. B. 'Banjo' Paterson, Angus and Robertson, 1990
- The Collected Verse of Banjo Paterson edited by Clement Semmler, Penguin, 1992
- Selected Poems: A. B. Paterson edited by Les Murray, Angus and Robertson, 1992
- Banjo Paterson: His Poetry and Prose edited by Richard Hall, Allen & Unwin, 1993
- The Advertiser, 26 January 1994
- Two Centuries of Australian Poetry edited by Kathrine Bell, Gary Allen, 2007
- Banjo Paterson: The Man Who Wrote Waltzing Matilda by Derek Parker, Woodslane Press, 2009
- Banjo Paterson Treasury by A. B. Paterson, Random House, 2013

== See also ==
- 1891 in Australian literature
- 1891 in poetry
