= The Golden Lake =

1890 novel by Carlton Dawe

- Title page for The Golden Lake (1891)
- Author: Carlton Dawe
- Original title: The Marvellous History of a Journey Through the Great Lone Land of Australia
- Language: English
- Genre: Science fiction
- Publisher: Trischler, London
- Publication date: 1890
- Publication place: Australia
- Media type: Print (Hardcover)
- Pages: 284

The Golden Lake (1890) is a science fiction adventure novel by Australian author Carlton Dawe. It was subtitled: "The Marvellous History of a Journey Through the Great Lone Land of Australia".

== Premise ==
Two adventurers, Dick Hardwicke and Archibald Martesque, use a map bequeathed by a dying explorer to discover a golden lake hidden in the Australian interior.

== Critical appraisal ==
In her essay "Fabulating the Australian Desert: Australia's Lost Race Romances, 1890-1908", (Philament No. 3, April 2004) Melissa Bellanta includes this novel under the general category of Australian "lost race romances" along with Francis Hogan's The Lost Explorer (1890), Ernest Favenc's The Secret of the Australian Desert (1896) and Marooned on Australia (1896), John David Hennessey's An Australian Bush Track (1896), George Firth Scott's The Last Lemurian (1898), Rosa Praed's Fugitive Anne (1902), Alexander MacDonald's The Lost Explorers (1906) and William Sylvester Walker's The Silver Queen (1908).

== Reviews ==
Writing in The Brisbane Courier at the time of the book's publication, a reviewer stated: "This work of "The Golden Lake" is Rider Haggard, out-haggarded. It is a bold feat of stand and deliver, every faculty but credulity, and it deserves corresponding approbation to find in these latter days of scepticism, a writer and a publisher with coinage sufficient to count upon a remunerative quantity of readers. The imagination of the bushmen is sufficiently fertile to produce stiff yarns, but for a sequence of glaring improbabilities commend us to the idealist who has distorted every canon of bush law to create a bush legend."

A reviewer in The Sydney Morning Herald was equally as scathing: "To be entirely devoid of imagination is bad, although the persons so circumstanced are generally ignorant of their misfortune; but it is not so bad as to possess an imagination which submits to no control - a fancy which, once fairly started, revels in a phantasmagoria of incredibilities."
