= T.Y.S.O.N. =

1898 poem by Australian author Banjo Paterson

"T.Y.S.O.N." is a poem by Banjo Paterson, first published in The Australasian Pastoralists' Review on 15 December 1898. The subject of the poem was James Tyson, who had died early that month. The poem highlighted his good points and eccentricities.

But in that last great drafting yard,
Where Peter keeps the gate,
And souls of sinners find it barred,
And go to meet their fate;
There's one who ought to enter in,
For good deeds done on earth;
Such deeds as merit ought to win,
Kind deeds of sterling worth.
Not by the straight and narrow gate,
Reserved for wealthy men,
But through the big gate, opened wide,
The grizzled figure, eagle-eyed,
Will travel through—and then
Old Peter'll say : "We pass him through,
There's many a thing he used to do,
Good-hearted things that no one know;
That's T. Y. S. O. N."

James Tyson (8 April 1819 – 4 December 1898) was an Australian pastoralist and is regarded as Australia's first self-made millionaire. Unmarried and without children, he died intestate in 1898 and his extensive holdings were sold off and divided among his closest relatives.
