= The Travelling Post Office =

Poem by Banjo Paterson

- by A. B. Paterson
- Written: 1894
- First published in: The Bulletin
- Country: Australia
- Language: English
- Publication date: 10 March 1894
- Lines: 34

Full text
- The Travelling Post Office at Wikisource

Unfinished - individual poem - Gilmore, Lawson, Harpur, Kendall, Paterson

"The Travelling Post Office" is a poem by Australian bush poet Banjo Paterson (Andrew Barton Paterson).

It was first published in The Bulletin on 10 March 1894.

== Analysis ==
An old man's son has left home to go driving sheep along the Castlereagh. The old man asks the author to write a letter to his son and to post it "Care of Conroy's sheep along the Castlereagh," thinking that the various mailmen along the way will pass it along until it reaches the son.

== Critical reception ==
While reviewing The Man from Snowy River and Other Verses a writer in The Sydney Morning Herald noted of this poem, among others, that it "finds the authentic transcript of the moods of inland Australia, the life of her people, and sometimes in their own words."

Another critic, reviewing the same collection in Freeman's Journal, commented that in reading the poem "we feel that indefinable charm which distinguishes all true poetry, but which defies analysis."

In his commentary on the poem in 60 Classic Australian Poems Geoff Page noted that while the story in the poem is "minimal" it is "no less real" than some of the poet's other works. And while the "history and scoiology of the poem are simplistic at best", the "virtues of the ballad stanza appear" timeless.

== Publication history ==
After its original publication in The Bulletin the poem was also included in the following anthologies, among others:

- The Man from Snowy River and Other Verses, by A. B. Paterson, Angus and Robertson, 1895
- An Anthology of Australian Verse edited by Bertram Stevens, Angus and Robertson, 1907
- The Golden Treasury of Australian Verse edited by Bertram Stevens, Angus and Robertson, 1909
- The Children's Treasury of Australian Verse edited by Bertram Stevens and George Mackaness, Angus and Robertson, 1913
- Selections from Australian Poets edited by Bertram Stephens and George Mackaness, Cornstalk Publishing, 1925
- The Oxford Book of Australasian Verse edited by Walter Murdoch, Oxford University Press, 1945
- Songs for All Seasons : 100 Poems for Young People edited by Rosemary Dobson, Angus and Robertson, 1967
- Australia Fair : Poems and Paintings edited by Douglas Stewart, Ure Smith, 1974
- The Collins Book of Australian Poetry edited by Rodney Hall, Collins, 1981
- The Bulletin, 22-29 December 1981
- Singer of the Bush, A. B. (Banjo) Paterson : Complete Works 1885-1900 edited by Rosamund Campbell and Philippa Harvie, 1983
- The Illustrated Treasury of Australian Verse edited by Beatrice Davis, Nelson, 1984
- The Banjo's Best-Loved Poems edited by edited by Rosamund Campbell and Philippa Harvie, Weldon Publishing, 1985
- The New Oxford Book of Australian Verse edited by Les Murray, Oxford University Press, 1986
- Banjo Paterson’s Poems of the Bush, J. M. Dent, 1987
- A Vision Splendid: The Complete Poetry of A. B. 'Banjo' Paterson, Angus and Robertson, 1990
- Selected Poems : A. B. Paterson edited by Les Murray, 1992
- A. B. (Banjo) Paterson : Bush Ballads, Poems, Stories and Journalism edited by Clement Semmler, 1992
- Banjo Paterson : His Poetry and Prose edited by Richard Hall, 1993
- The Bush Poems of A. B. (Banjo) Paterson edited by Jack Thompson, FinePoets, 2008
- 60 Classic Australian Poems edited by Geoff Page, University of NSW Press, 2009
- 60 Classic Australian Poems for Children edited by Chris Cheng, Random House, 2009
- The Puncher & Wattmann Anthology of Australian Poetry edited by John Leonard, Puncher & Wattmann, 2009
- Australian Poetry Since 1788 edited by Geoffrey Lehmann and Robert Gray, University of NSW Press, 2011
- Banjo Paterson Treasury by A. B. Paterson, Random House, 2013

== See also ==
- 1894 in Australian literature
