= A Bush Christening =

1893 poem by Banjo Paterson

- by Banjo Paterson
- Original title: "The Christening of Maginnis Magee"
- First published in: The Bulletin
- Country: Australia
- Language: English
- Publication date: 16 December 1893
- Preceded by: "Behind the Scenes"
- Followed by: "The Geebung Polo Club"

Full text
- A Bush Christening at Wikisource

A Bush Christening is a humorous poem by Australian writer and poet Andrew Barton "Banjo" Paterson. It was first published in The Bulletin magazine on 16 December 1893 (under its original title of "The Christening of Maginnis Magee"), the Christmas issue of that publication. It has been called "a rollicking account of how the traditional pre-occupations, whisky and religion, come together".

== Plot summary ==
‘Mike was the dad of a ten-year-old lad’ (stanza 2, line 5) who has never been christened. Magee lives "On the outer Barcoo where the churches are few,"(stanza 1, line 1) and rarely sees a priest. By chance a priest passes by one day and his parents decide to christen the boy as soon as possible. The Magee (son) overhears the conversation, and, thinking that a "christening" is like branding of animals, decides to make a run for it. The priest and parents chase after him. They see that they have no chance of catching the runaway boy, ‘so the priest, flung a flask at his head that was labelled ‘Maginnis Whisky’ (stanza 11, line 43, 44). Thereafter the boy is known and christened as "Maginnis Magee". He grows up to be a justice of the peace who hates to be asked how he came to be christened "Maginnis".

== See also ==
- 1893 in poetry
- 1893 in literature
- 1893 in Australian literature
- Australian literature

== Notes ==
The poem has been linked by Australian literary researcher Lucy Sussex to an anonymous story, "Peggy's Christening", in the Colonial Monthly, April 1868.

== Further publications ==
- The Man from Snowy River and Other Verses by Banjo Paterson (1895)
- From the Ballads to Brennan edited by T. Inglis Moore, Angus & Robertson, 1964
- A Treasury of Colonial Poetry (1982)
- Singer of the Bush, A. B. (Banjo) Paterson : Complete Works 1885-1900 edited by Rosamund Campbell and Philippa Harvie (1983)
- My Country : Australian Poetry and Short Stories, Two Hundred Years edited by Leonie Kramer (1985)
- A Vision Splendid : The Complete Poetry of A. B. 'Banjo' Paterson (1990)
- A Treasury of Bush Verse edited by G. A. Wilkes, Angus and Robertson, 1991
