= A Bushman's Song =

Poem by Australian writer A. B. Paterson

- by A. B. Paterson
- Original title: Travelling Down the Castlereagh
- Written: 1892
- First published in: The Bulletin
- Country: Australia
- Language: English
- Publication date: 24 December 1892

Full text
- A Bushman's Song at Wikisource

"A Bushman's Song" (1892) is a poem by Australian poet A. B. Paterson.

It was originally published in The Bulletin on 24 December 1892, with the title "Travelling Down the Castlereagh", and subsequently reprinted in a collection of the author's poems, other newspapers and periodicals and a number of Australian poetry anthologies.

== Critical reception ==
While reviewing the poet's collection The Man From Snowy Rover and Other Verses a reviewer in The Sydney Morning Herald noted: "In poems such as 'The Travelling Post-office,' 'Clancy of the Overflow,' 'On Kiley's Run,' 'Black Swans,' 'In the Droving Days,' 'A Bushman's Song,' 'The 'Wind's Message,' 'The Daylight is Dying,' and a few others, one finds the authentic transcript of the moods of inland Australia, the life of her people, and sometimes in their own words."

The Oxford Companion to Australian Literature states: "In 'A Bushman's Song' [Paterson] is the radical, putting the case for the ordinary drover and shearer against the squatter and the absentee landlord."

== Publication history ==
After the poem's initial publication in The Bulletin it was reprinted as follows:

- The Man from Snowy River and Other Verses by Banjo Paterson, 1895
- The Collected Verse of A. B. Paterson : Containing 'The Man from Snowy River', 'Rio Grande' and 'Saltbush Bill, M.P.', 1921
- The Oxford Book of Australasian Verse edited by Walter Murdoch, 1924 [Note: not included in 1918 edition.]
- New Song in an Old Land edited by Rex Ingamells, 1943
- Spoils of Time : Some Poems of the English Speaking Peoples edited by Rex Ingamells, 1948
- The Bulletin, 11 May 1955, with the title "Travelling Down the Castlereagh"
- The Boomerang Book of Australian Poetry edited by Enid Moodie Heddle, 1956
- Favourite Australian Poems edited by Ian Mudie, Rigby, 1963
- From the Ballads to Brennan edited by T. Inglis Moore, Angus & Robertson, 1964
- The Penguin Australian Song Book edited by J. S. Manifold, 1964
- Folk Songs of Australia and the Men and Women Who Sang Them edited by John Meredith and Hugh Anderson, 1967
- The Overlander Songbook edited by Ronald George Edwards, 1971
- Australian Verse from 1805 : A Continuum edited by Geoffrey Dutton, 1976
- Singer of the Bush, A. B. (Banjo) Paterson : Complete Works 1885-1900 edited by Rosamund Campbell and Philippa Harvie, 1983
- Duke of the Outback : The Adventures of "A Shearer Named Tritton" by Duke Tritton and John Meredith
- The Bushwackers Australian Song Book edited by Jan Wositzky and Dobe Newton, 1988
- A Treasury of Bush Verse edited by G. A. Wilkes, Angus and Robertson, 1991
- Selected Poems : A. B. Paterson edited by Les Murray, 1992
- A. B. (Banjo) Paterson : Bush Ballads, Poems, Stories and Journalism edited by Clement Semmler, 1992
- The Penguin Book of Australian Ballads edited by Elizabeth Webby and Philip Butterss, Penguin, 1993
- Banjo Paterson : His Poetry and Prose edited by Richard Hall, 1993
- The Collected Verse of Banjo Paterson edited by Clement Semmler, 1993
- Australian Verse : An Oxford Anthology edited by John Leonard, Melbourne University Press, 1998
- Classic Australian Verse edited by Maggie Pinkney, Five Mile Press, 2001

== See also ==
- 1892 in Australian literature
- 1892 in poetry
