= Carlton Dawe =

Australian author (1865–1935)

William Carlton Lanyon Dawe, generally known as Carlton Dawe (30 July 1865 – 30 May 1935), was a prolific Australian author of over 70 books including romance, mystery and crime.

== Biography ==
William was born in Moonta, South Australia in 1865 to Henry Dawe and Francis Lanyon. Dawe was born in Adelaide and came from an old Cornish family. He grew up with his sister, Gwendoline Lanyon Dawe. In 1885, he published in Sydonia and other Poems in London, beginning a trend of publishing novels in both this city and his local Melbourne.

Both Zantha and the poetry book were published under his given name, William Dawe. After that, the author began publishing under his more well known name, Carlton Dawe. Dawe began by writing poetry and fiction, then morphed it into thrillers and romances by the end of his career as a writer.

While in Hong Kong, Dawe was initiated into the Masonic order at the Zetland Lodge on 16 February 1887 at the age of 23. Still operational, the lodge is now known as the Zetland Hall.

It is unclear whether or not Dawe was married or had any children. The 1901 England Census records the "author" as residing in Battersea in a house with his unmarried sister Gwendolen, Helen C. Crough (possibly his landlady), her teenage son Charles, and a servant, Alice Warren. He appears to have lived for several decades at 2A Flat C Wetherby Terrace, in London. In 1935, Dawe died in Middlesex, England in 1935, leaving £13 to his unmarried sister, Gwendoline through his will.

== Themes ==
Dawe's experiences of growing up in Australia influence many of his novels and essays. A later novel, The Golden Lake (1891), has been described as a Lemurian novel and is an adventure story based on the search for a cave of gold in Australia. The Emu's Head (1893) is about the violence in Australian gold mines.

Other of his fictional works are strongly influenced by his adventures in the Far East. Dawe was a lifelong traveller, journeying around the world more than once and living for a time in Asia, before settling permanently in England from 1892 onwards. His work often examined the difficulties of a white man's settlement in the Far East, and his earlier short stories anticipate Joseph Conrad and Somerset Maugham.

Dawe also wrote many stories about the problems of colonial civil servants faced when pursuing interracial marriage, as these were issues he witnessed first hand while traveling. Yellow and White (1895) and Kakemonos (1897), are collections of short stories and notes along this line and gave straightforward accounts of interracial sex ("the love of the white for the yellow"). Yellow Man (1900) is a thriller involving Chinese secret societies.

In total, Dawe published 74 novels between 1890 and 1936. Additionally, he wrote a few plays; The Black Spider was produced in London in 1927. Towards the end of his life, Dawe also had two plays filmed, The Black Spider (US: Foolish Monte Carlo) in 1920 and The Shadow of Evil in 1921.

== Works ==
Dawe published more than seventy-seven books during his life, covering romance, mystery and crime.

- Sydonia, and Others Poems (1885)
- Love and the World, And Other Poems (1886)
- Zantha (1886)
- Sketches in Verse (1889)
- The Golden Lake (1890)
- Mount Desolation (1892)
- The Emu's Head: a Chronicle of Dead Man's Flat (1893)
- The History of Godfrey Kinge (1893)
- The Pilgrims: a Bit of Cornwall in Australia (1894)
- The Confessions of a Currency Girl (1894)
- Yellow and White (1895)
- Captain Castle (1897)
- Kakemonos (1897)
- A Bride of Japan (1898)
- The Voyage of the "Pulo Way" (1898)
- The Mandarin (1899)
- The Yellow Man (1900)
- The Great Lonely One (1900)
- Rose and Chrysanthemum (1900)
- Claudia Pole (1901)
- Straws in the Wind (1901)
- The Demagogue (1902)
- The London Plot (1903)
- The Prime Minister and Mrs. Grantham (1903)
- Lammas Grove (1904)
- The Grand Duke (1905)
- A Morganatic Marriage (1906)
- The Life Perilous (1907)
- Her Highness's Secretary (1907)
- Feuilleton (1907)
- The Red Hammock (1907)
- The Plotters of Peking (1907)
- The Confessions of Cleodora (1908)
- One Fair Enemy (1908)
- The Woman, the Man, and the Monster (1909)
- The New Andromeda (1909)
- A Saint in Mufti (1910)
- The Black Spider (1911). Filmed in 1920.
- The Shadow of Evil (1913). Filmed in 1921.
- Eternel Glory: a Novel (1912)
- The Crackswoman (1914)
- The Girl from Nippon (1915)
- The Super Barbarians (1915)
- The Redemption of Grace Milroy (1916)
- The Woman with the Yellow Eyes (1917)
- The Admiralty's Secret (1918)
- The Mighty Arm (1919)
- A Brush with Fate (1920)
- A Tangled Marriage (1921)
- Euryale in London (1922)
- Stranger Than Fiction (1923)
- Virginia (1923)
- Desperate Love (1924)
- The Temptation of Selma (1924)
- The Way of a Maid (1925)
- Love, the Conqueror (1925)
- The Forbidden Shrine (1926)
- The Glare (1926)
- The Knightsbridge Affair (1927)
- Slings and Arrows (1927)
- After Many Days (1928)
- Pacific Blue (1928)
- The Desirable Woman (1929)
- The Winding Road (1929)
- The Missing Clue (1930)
- Fishers of Men (1930)
- Leathermouth (1931)
- Wanted ! (1931)
- Fifteen Keys (1932)
- Lawless (1932)
- The Sign of the Glove (1932)
- The Man of Many Faces (1932)
- The Chief (1933)
- Crumpled Lilies (1933)
- The Law of the Knife (1934)
- Leathermouth's Luck (1934)
- The Missing Treaty (1934)
- A Royal Alliance (1935)
- Waste Lands (1935)
- The Green Killer (1936)
- Tough Company (1936)
- Live Cartridge (1937)
- A Strange Destiny (1937)
