= The Geebung Polo Club =

Poem by Australian poet Banjo Paterson

- Short story by Banjo Paterson
- Country: Australia
- Language: English

Publication
- Published in: The Antipodean
- Publication type: Periodical
- Media type: Print (Magazine, Hardback & Paperback)
- Publication date: 1893

Chronology
A Bush Christening	Black Swans

"The Geebung Polo Club" is a poem by Banjo Paterson, first published in The Antipodean in c. 14 December 1893. It was also included in his first anthology of bush poetry The Man from Snowy River and Other Verses in October 1895.

== Style ==
It is one of Paterson's best-known poems and combines several of the most frequently recurring characteristics of his poetry – humour, tragedy and horses; and was given as "finest example of the humor of exaggeration in the language". Paterson's love of polo formed the basis of the poem.

The poem's unnamed narrator clearly admires the rough and ready "Geebung Polo Club", who are contrasted with their wealthy city opponents, "The Cuff and Collar Team".

Equestrian illustrations with the poem were done by Frank P. Mahony.

== Historical origins ==
In February 1939, Paterson gave an insight into the poem's origins. Able to proceed through the Australian banking crisis of 1893, an English cavalry officer started a polo club in Sydney. From there,

We played a match against the Cooma team, real wild men with cabbage-tree hats, and skin-tight pants, their hats held on by a strap under their noses. I must have had the gift of prophecy because, before we went up, I wrote a jingle called "The Geebung Polo Club," a jingle which has outlasted much better work.

Another writer added: One of the "Roughies" Ted Litchfield travelled from Cooma to Goulburn in 1892, and competed against the "classy locals" beside the town's Wollondilly River. Paterson was a spectator at this match, and on return to Cooma, arranged for a city team to play the local Cooma team. At the conclusion of the game, people retired to the Prince of Wales Hotel, and when asked to recite "The man from Snowy River"; instead Paterson presented the more appropriate "The Geebung Polo Club". (It has also been claimed the poem was first recited at the Monaro Polo Club, after players from that club had defeated the rival Goulburn district club; and at Muswellbrook.)

One researcher indicated the poem "was written just after the Cox Brothers came down from Wagga Wagga and played in Sydney. They swept everything before them. They were never beaten". (With the Wagga Polo Club formed in June 1887, the brothers were celebrated polo players: Richard (d. 1891), Oliver (d. 1892), Thomas, and John (d. 1915). Oliver was given to be the best polo player in NSW in 1892.)

The Cooma Polo Club was officially established in October 1892, with twenty-one members, so the first match likely occurred in the second half of 1892 and led to the club's formation. Goulburn's Argyle Polo Club was not officially established until April 1893. By January 1893, in a match between Cooma and Goulburn on the latter's racecourse grounds, it was reported the new Cooma club had the largest membership within the Colony of New South Wales.

On Tuesday 9 May 1893, a Sydney team arrived in Goulburn, after competing against Cooma on the Monday. Amongst the Sydney riders was Paterson, who "played a brilliant game throughout".

The significant competitions commenced on Monday 18 September 1893, where the first of three games was played between Cooma and Union at Sydney's Centennial Park, and included Paterson for Sydney, and Ted Litchfield and Zouch Moriarty (team captain) for Cooma. It was played before many distinguished persons including the colony's governor. The second game was on the Wednesday and held at Sydney's Rosehill Racecourse, Cooma winning 4:2, and where it was reported:

Some Indian visitors present at the match were of opinion that the game was played with dangerous recklessness, but with such skilful [sic] riders as the Cooma men there is not much fear of collision or accident.

A third game was held for the Friday, again at Rosehill.

It is likely the first rendition of the poem was held at a Prince of Wales Hotel, in Sydney, on Friday night, 22 September 1893. The May 1893 Sydney–Cooma game day finished with a banquet at George Rolfe's Prince of Wales Hotel in Cooma; an earlier writer indicates the poem was written after that May 1893 match, despite Paterson indicating it was written before a match that may have been the May instance. With a December 1893 publication date, the poem is more likely to have been written around September 1893.

James Malcolm Campbell from Muswellbrook, New South Wales died in 1932, and was said to be a member of the town's club whose club was given to be used as a basis for the poem. The "town" team was said to have consisted of a Sydney group of military officers, who brought their valets. The Muswellbrook team was described as "the long and wiry natives from the rugged mountain side". A complete list of Cooma or Goulburn players at the times of the 1892, or May or September 1893, matches is not available.

Pioneering grazier Ted Litchfield, who died in 1953 aged 93, was the second-last member of the first Cooma match, leaving 1892 Cooma club secretary Zouch Moriarty the sole survivor of the historic team. Cooma were the "ferocious band of polo experts", up against the Goulburn "gougers". Moriarty died in 1962 aged about 97.

== Name associations ==
While it has been suggested that the Brisbane suburb of Geebung might be the origin of the polo club's name, there is no evidence to support this while a number of claims assert that the name is a fictitious place, noting also that the mention of the Campaspe River suggests a location in Victoria rather than in Queensland.

Author and historian Frank Clune in 1940 suggested Dandaloo as the headquarters of Paterson's Geebung Polo Club; a distance of 465 kilometres (289 mi) NNW of Cooma. However, Cooma's 'Polo Flat' area did not take that name until after 1893.

== Use in popular culture ==
Upon its original publication, the poem has also been parodied and been a cento for other poems, including rifle shooting, dancing, tennis, hockey, football, and shearing.

Scottish-Australian bush poet, and acquaintance of Paterson, Will H. Ogilvie penned "For the honor of Old England and the glory of the game" in 1897. Although similar in nature to Paterson's earlier-written "The Geebung Polo Club", Ogilvie's work was written after an actual polo competition in Parkes, New South Wales, involving Harry 'Breaker' Morant and Ogilvie.

A number of sporting clubs have adopted the team name of the "Geebungs" at one time, for polo, and other sports such as cricket.

There is a Victorian era hotel in affluent Melbourne suburb of Hawthorn that was called The Geebung Polo Club for many years.

There is an annual Geebung polo match held near Dinner Plain in the Victorian Alps. The teams are the "Geebung Polo Club" and"Cuff n' Collar".

Between the 1980s and the early 2000s there was also a hotel of this name in the inner Sydney suburb of Redfern on the corner of George and Redfern Streets, which was initially run by Wilton Morley, son of the British actor Robert Morley. Today the Hotel trades as The Redfern.
