= Banjo Paterson =

Australian journalist, author, and poet (1864–1941)

Banjo Paterson CBE
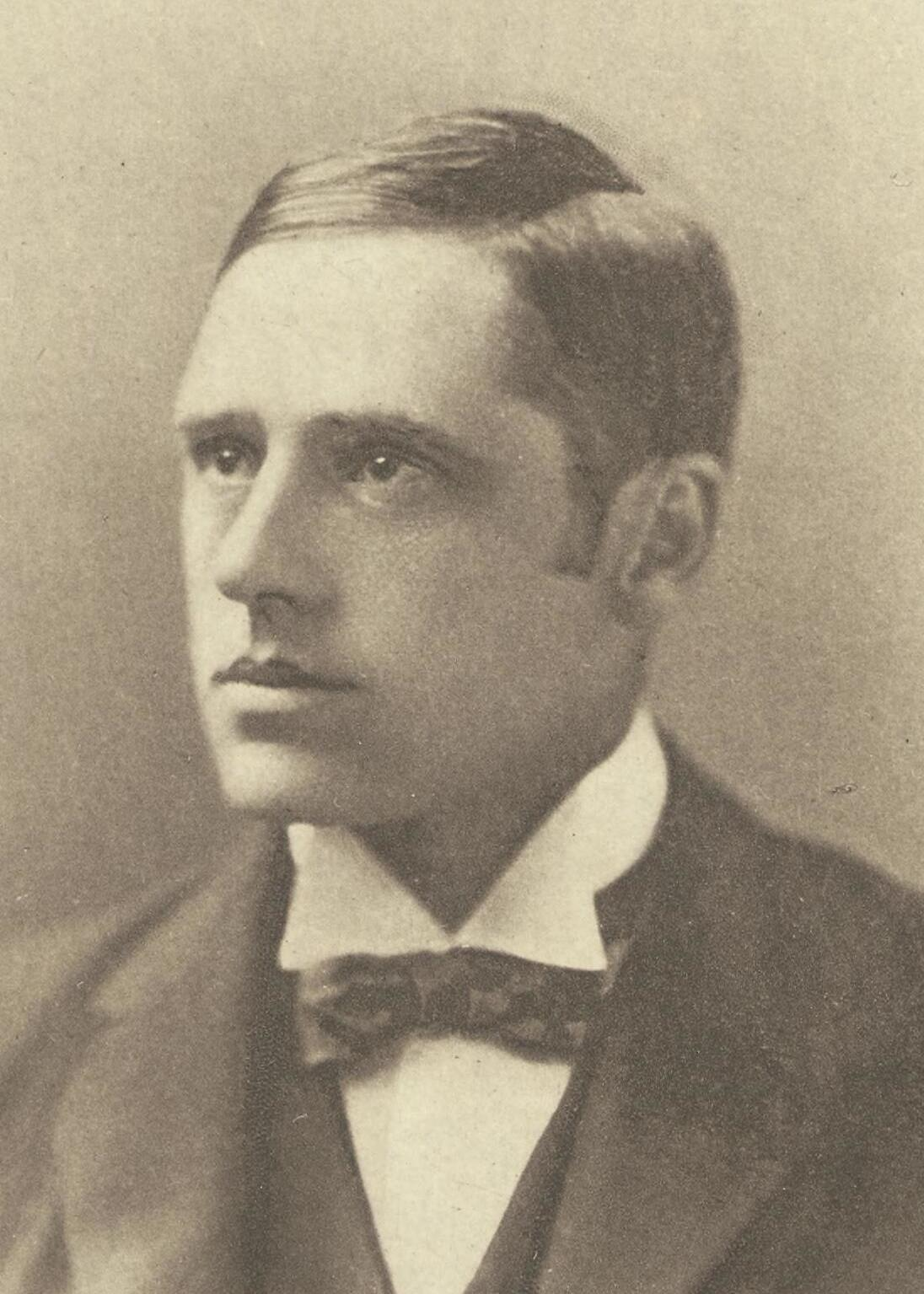
- Banjo Paterson, c. 1890
- Born: Andrew Barton Paterson; 17 February 1864 "Narrambla", near Orange, New South Wales, Australia
- Died: 5 February 1941 (aged 76); Sydney, New South Wales, Australia
- Resting place: Northern Suburbs Crematorium, Sydney, New South Wales, Australia
- Occupations: Author, journalist, composer, clerk, poet
- Spouse: Alice Emily Walker (m. 1903)
- Children: 2
- Relatives: John Paterson (uncle)

Andrew Barton "Banjo" Paterson (17 February 1864 – 5 February 1941) was an Australian bush poet, journalist and author, widely considered one of the greatest writers of Australia's colonial period.

Born in rural New South Wales, Paterson worked as a lawyer before transitioning into literature, where he quickly gained recognition for capturing the life of the Australian bush. A representative of the Bulletin School of Australian literature, Paterson wrote many of his best known poems for the nationalist journal The Bulletin, including "Clancy of the Overflow" (1889) and "The Man from Snowy River" (1890). His 1895 ballad "Waltzing Matilda" is regarded widely as Australia's unofficial national anthem and, according to the National Film and Sound Archive, has been recorded more than any other Australian song.

== Early life ==
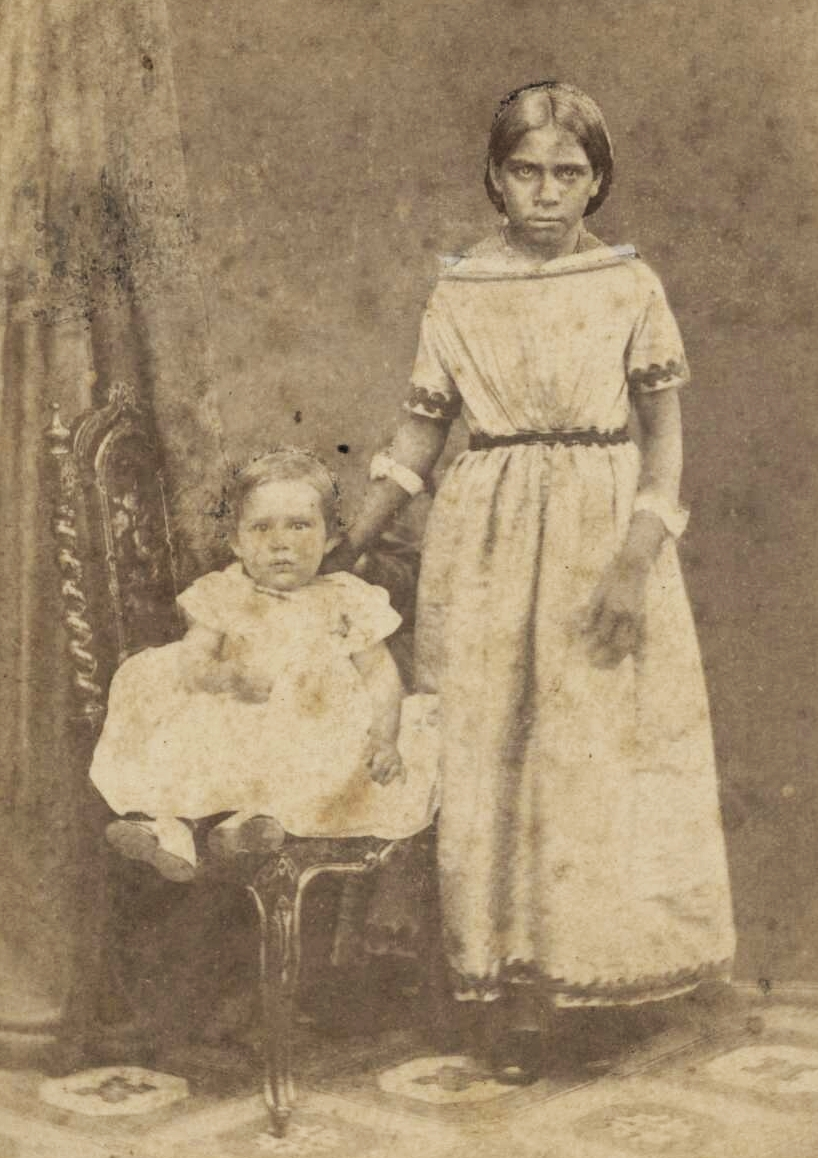
Paterson as a baby with his nanny, Wiradjuri girl Fanny Hopkins, mid-1860s

Andrew Barton Paterson was born on 17 February 1864 at the property "Narrambla", near Orange, New South Wales, the eldest son of Andrew Bogle Paterson, a Scottish immigrant from Lanarkshire, and Australian-born Rose Isabella Barton, related to the future first prime minister of Australia, Edmund Barton. Paterson's family lived on the isolated Buckinbah Station near Yeoval NSW until he was five when his father lost his wool clip in a flood and was forced to sell up. When Paterson's uncle John Paterson died, his family took over John Paterson's farm in Illalong, near Yass, close to the main route between Melbourne and Sydney. Bullock teams, Cobb and Co coaches and drovers were familiar sights to him. He also saw horsemen from the Murrumbidgee River area and Snowy Mountains country take part in picnic races and polo matches, which led to his fondness of horses and inspired his writings.

Paterson's early education came from a governess, but when he was able to ride a pony, he was taught at the bush school at Binalong. In 1874 Paterson was sent to Sydney Grammar School, performing well both as a student and a sportsman. During this time, he lived in a cottage called Rockend, in the suburb of Gladesville. The cottage is now listed on the Register of the National Estate and New South Wales State Heritage Register. He left the prestigious school at 16 after failing an examination for a scholarship to the University of Sydney.

== Career ==
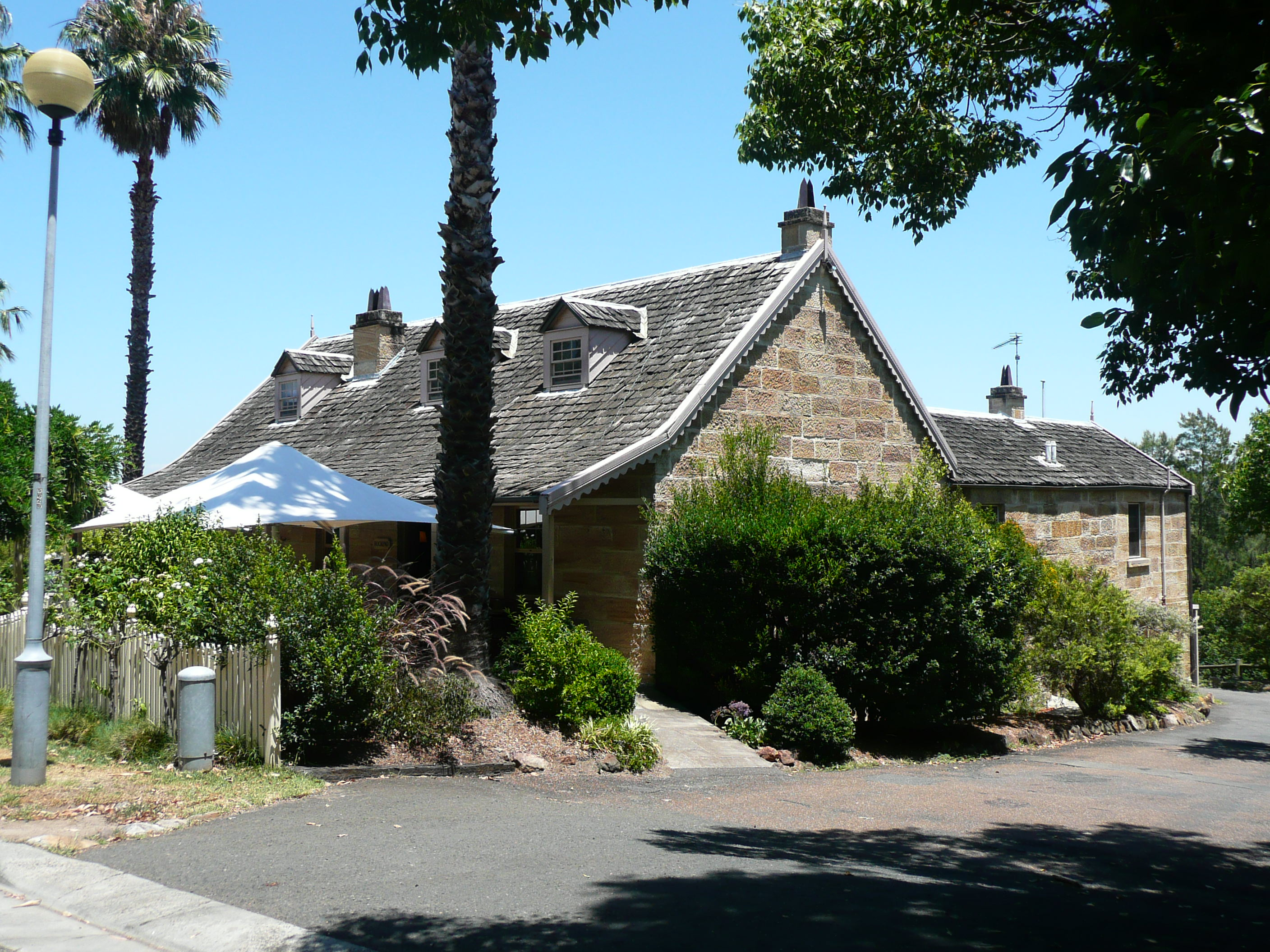
The Gladesville cottage Rockend, where Paterson lived in the 1870s and 1880s

Paterson was a law clerk with a Sydney-based firm headed by Herbert Salwey, and was admitted as a solicitor in 1886. In the years he practised as a solicitor, he also started writing. From 1885, he began submitting and having poetry published in The Bulletin, a literary journal with a nationalist focus. His earliest work was a poem criticising the British war in the Sudan, which also had Australian participation. Over the next decade, the influential journal provided an important platform for Paterson's work, which appeared under the pseudonym of "The Banjo", the name of his favourite horse. As one of its most popular writers through the 1890s, he formed friendships with other significant writers in Australian literature, such as E.J. Brady, Harry "Breaker" Morant, Will H. Ogilvie, and Henry Lawson. In particular, Paterson became engaged in a friendly rivalry of verse with Lawson about the allure of bush life.

=== Journalism ===
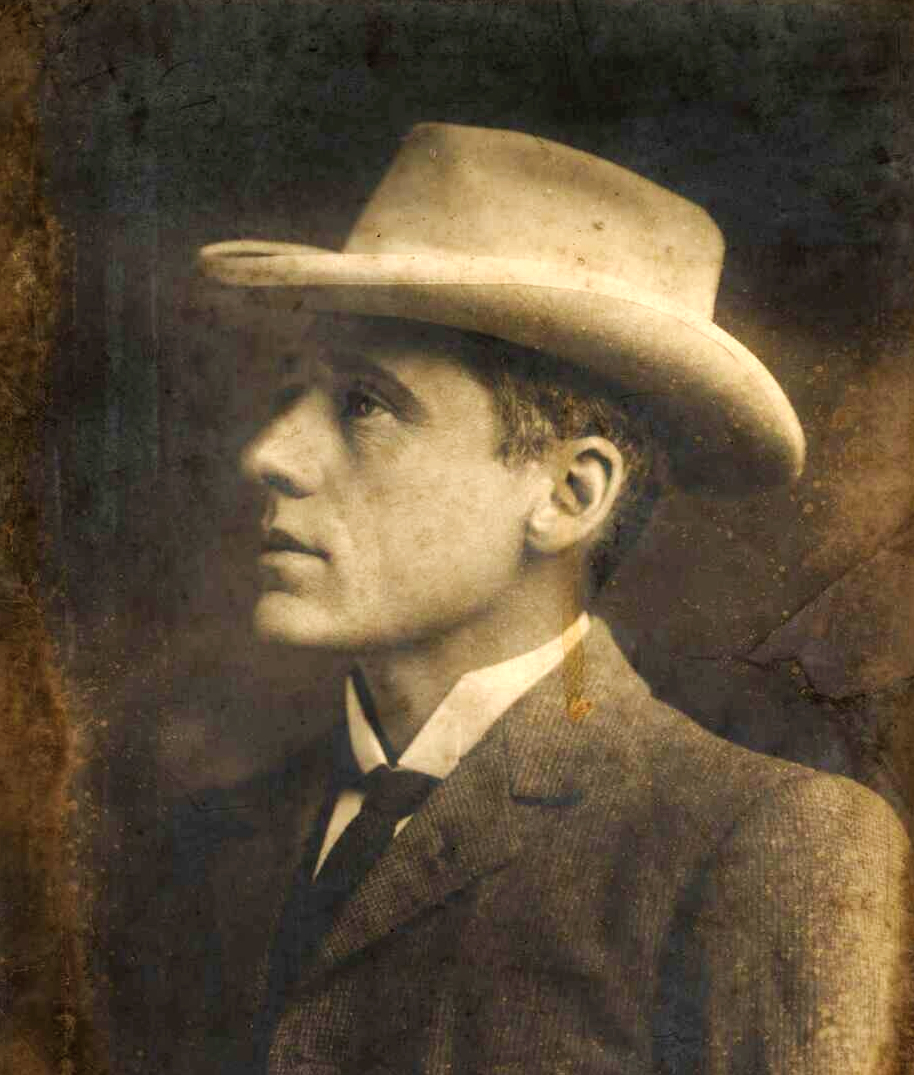
This portrait of Paterson is reproduced on the Australian ten-dollar note.

Paterson became a war correspondent for The Sydney Morning Herald and The Age during the Second Boer War, sailing for South Africa in October 1899. There he met fellow war correspondents Winston Churchill and Rudyard Kipling as well as British army leaders Kitchener, Roberts and Haig. His graphic accounts of the relief of Kimberley, surrender of Bloemfontein (the first correspondent to ride in) and the capture of Pretoria attracted the attention of the press in Britain. An untouched box of chocolates, created by the British company Cadburys for Queen Victoria as a 1900 New Year's gift for troops serving in South Africa, was discovered in Paterson's papers at the National Library of Australia in 2020.

Paterson was also was a correspondent during the Boxer Rebellion from 1901 to 1902, where he met George "Chinese" Morrison and later wrote about his meeting. In 1902 he accompanied a group of Australian settlers to Espiritu Santo in the New Hebrides, where they were establishing an agricultural settlement at Annandale. He wrote nine articles on the settlement scheme for the Herald.

Paterson was editor of Samuel Bennett's Evening News from 1903 to 1908, and his Town and Country Journal 1907 to 1908.

=== Hiatus and military service ===
In 1908, after a trip to the United Kingdom he decided to abandon journalism and writing and moved with his family to a 16,000-hectare (40,000-acre) property near Yass.

In World War I, Paterson failed to become a correspondent covering the fighting in Flanders, but did become an ambulance driver with the Australian Voluntary Hospital, Wimereux, France. He returned to Australia early in 1915 and, as an honorary vet, travelled on three voyages with horses to Africa, China and Egypt. He was commissioned in the 2nd Remount Unit, Australian Imperial Force on 18 October 1915, serving initially in France where he was wounded and reported missing in July 1916 and latterly as commanding officer of the unit based in Cairo, Egypt. He was repatriated to Australia and discharged from the army having risen to the rank of major in April 1919. His wife had joined the Red Cross and worked in an ambulance unit near her husband.

== Later life and death ==
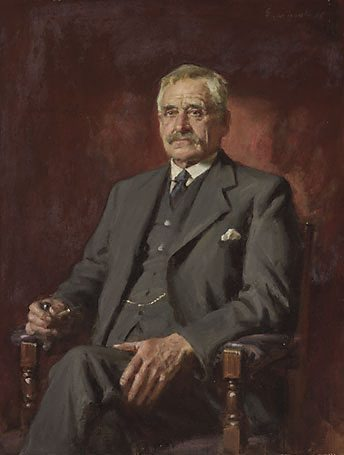
John Longstaff's portrait of Banjo Paterson, winner of the 1935 Archibald Prize

Just as he returned to Australia, the third collection of his poetry, Saltbush Bill JP, was published and he continued to publish verse, short stories and essays while continuing to write for the weekly Truth. Paterson also wrote on rugby league football in the 1920s for the Sydney Sportsman.

In December 1938, Paterson was appointed Commander of the British Empire (CBE).

He died of a heart attack in Sydney on 5 February 1941, aged 76.

== Personal life ==
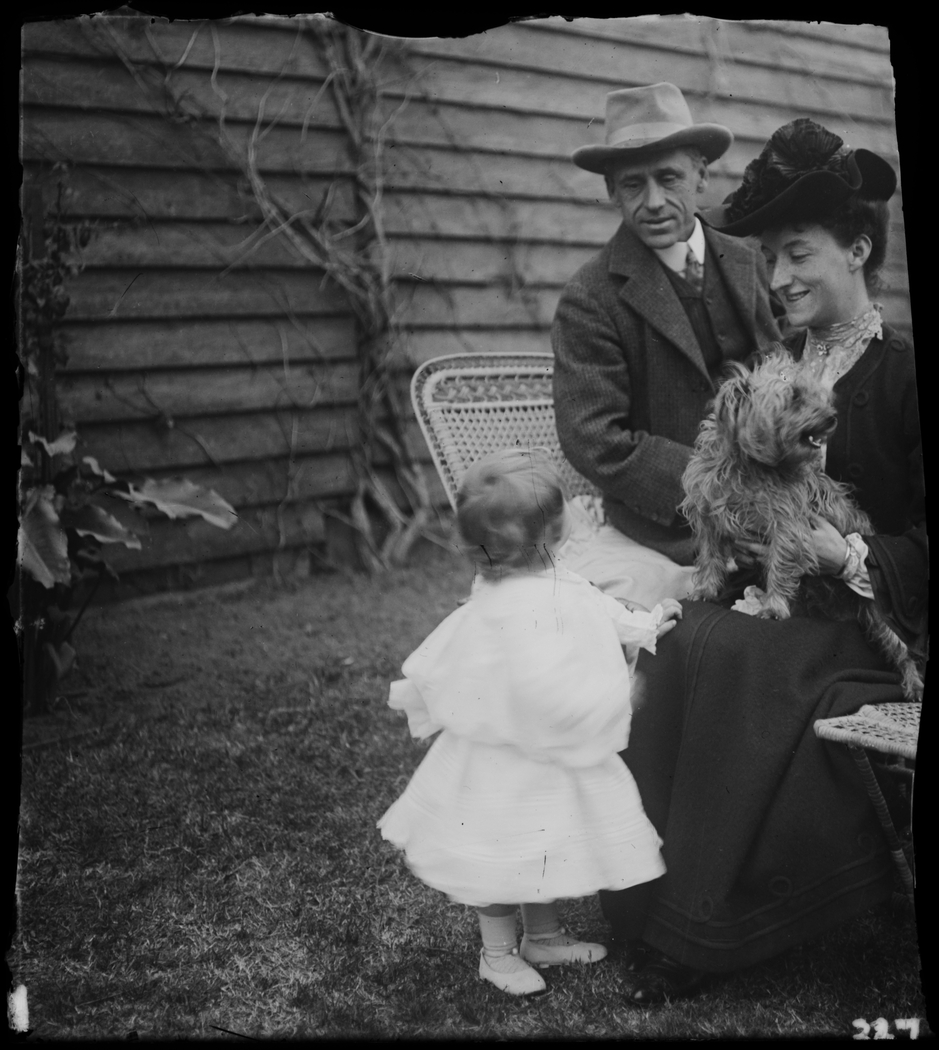
Paterson with his wife Alice and daughter Grace, photographed by Lionel Lindsay

On 8 April 1903, he married Alice Emily Walker, of Tenterfield Station, in St Stephen's Presbyterian Church, in Tenterfield, New South Wales. Their first home was in Queen Street, Woollahra. The Patersons had two children, Grace (born in 1904) and Hugh (born in 1906).

Paterson had been previously engaged to Sarah Riley for eight years, but this was abruptly called off in 1895 following a visit to her at Dagworth Station in Queensland where she was visiting the Macpherson family. It was here that Paterson met his fiancée's best friend from school days, Christina Macpherson, who composed the music for which he then wrote the lyrics of the famous Waltzing Matilda. However, following this collaboration Paterson was suddenly asked to leave the property, leading historians to conclude that he was a womaniser and had engaged in a scandalous romantic liaison with Macpherson.

== Works ==
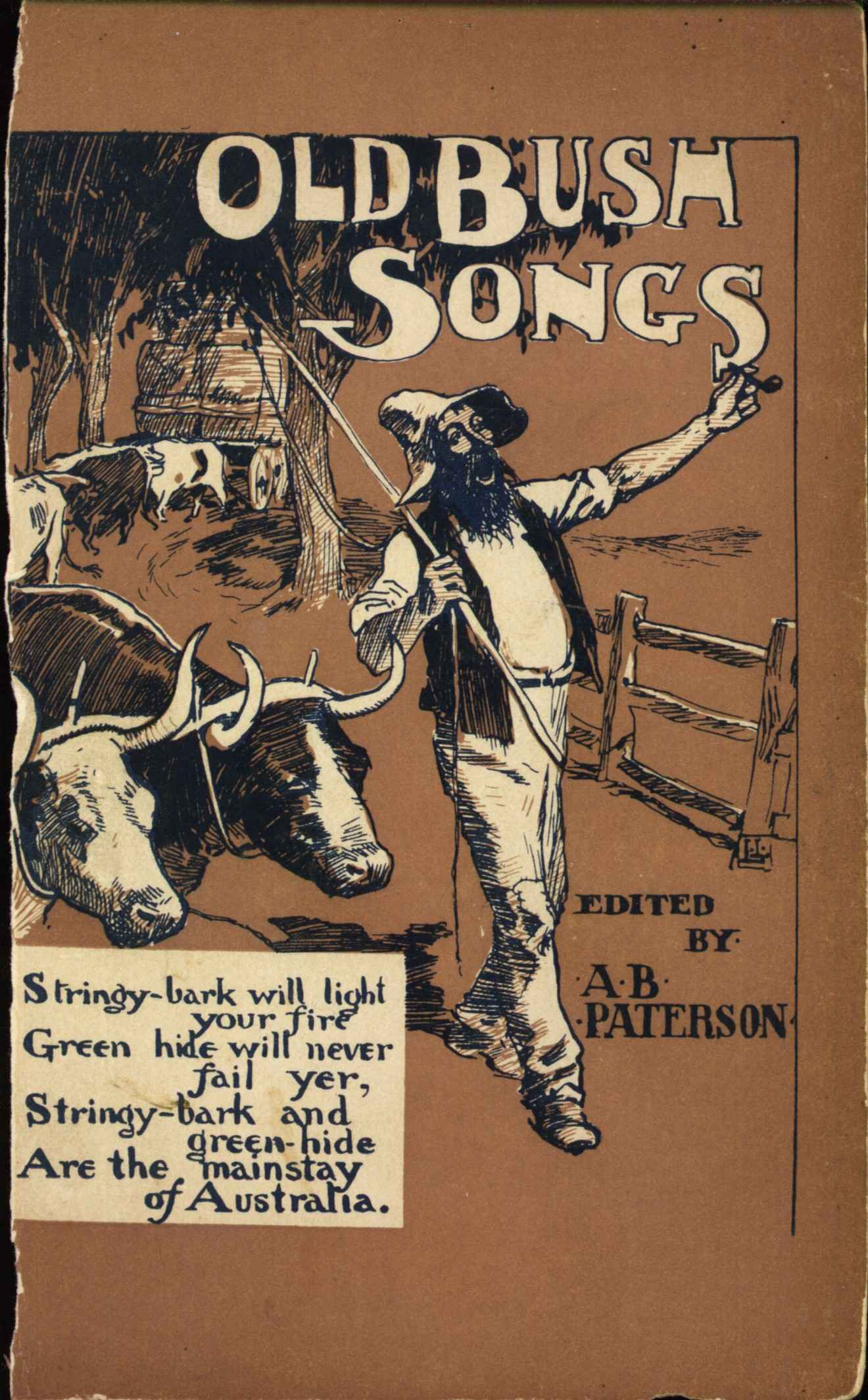
Cover to Paterson's seminal 1905 collection of bush ballads, entitled Old Bush Songs

The publication of The Man from Snowy River and five other ballads in The Bulletin made "The Banjo" a household name. In 1895, Angus & Robertson published these poems as a collection of Australian verse. The book sold 5000 copies in the first four months of publication.

In 1895, Paterson headed north to Dagworth station near Winton, Queensland. Travelling with fiancée, Sarah Riley, they met with her old school friend, Christina Macpherson, who had recently attended a race at Warrnambool in Victoria. She had heard a band playing a tune there, which became stuck in her head and replayed it for Paterson on the autoharp. The melody also resonated with him and propelled him to write "Waltzing Matilda" While there has been much debate about what inspired the words, the song became one of his most widely known and sung ballads.

In addition, he wrote the lyrics for songs with piano scores, such as "The Daylight is Dying" and Last Week. These were also published by Angus & Robertson between the years 1895 to 1899. In 1905, the same publishers released Old Bush Songs, a collection of bush ballads Paterson had been assembling since 1895.

Although for most of his adult life, Paterson lived and worked in Sydney, his poems mostly presented a highly romantic view of the bush and the iconic figure of the bushman. Influenced by the work of another Australian poet, John Farrell, his representation of the bushman as a tough, independent and heroic underdog became the ideal qualities underpinning the national character. His work is often compared to the prose of Henry Lawson, particularly the seminal work, "The Drover's Wife", which presented a considerably less romantic view of the harshness of rural existence of the late 19th century.

Paterson authored two novels; In No Man's Land (later titled An Outback Marriage) (1900) and The Shearer's Colt (1936), wrote many short stories; Three Elephant Power and Other Stories (1917), and wrote a book based on his experiences as a war reporter, Happy Dispatches (1934). He also wrote a book for children, The Animals Noah Forgot (1933).

Contemporary recordings of many of Paterson's well known poems have been released by Jack Thompson, who played Clancy in the 1982 film adaptation of "The Man from Snowy River". While having no connection to the movie, an Australian television series of the same name was broadcast in the 1990s.

Media reports in August 2008 stated that a previously unknown poem had been found in a war diary written during the Boer War.

== Legacy ==
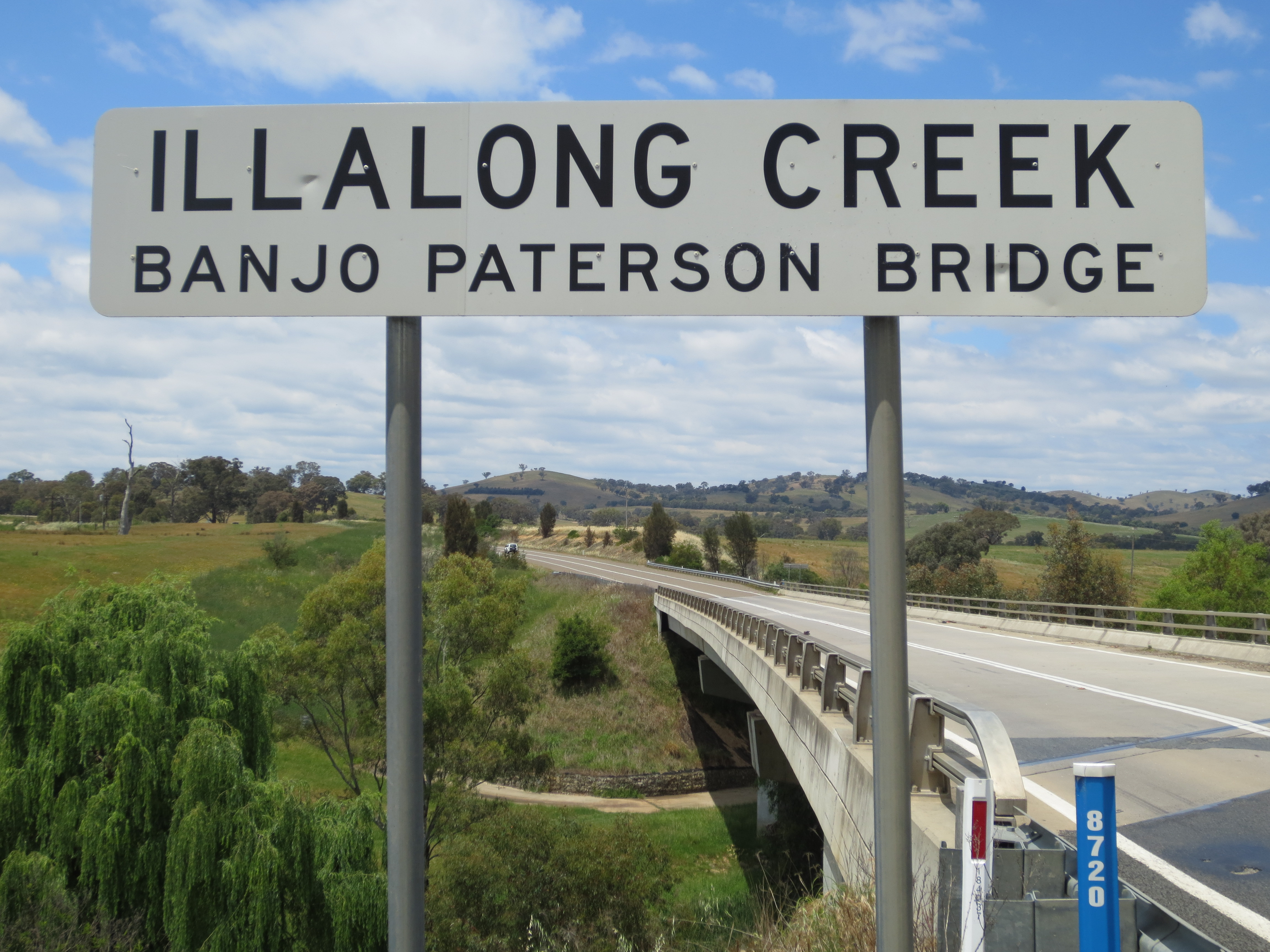
Bridge named after Banjo Paterson near Illalong

Banjo Paterson's image appears on the $10 note, along with an illustration inspired by "The Man From Snowy River" and, as part of the copy-protection microprint, the text of the poem itself.

Artist Violet Bowring painted a portrait of her one-time neighbour Banjo Paterson, now hanging in Sydney’s Australian Club, and used as the cover illustration of a book The Best of Banjo Paterson, compiled by Walter Stone, published in 1977.

In 1981, he was honoured on a postage stamp issued by Australia Post.

A.B. Paterson College, at Arundel on the Gold Coast, Australia, is named after Paterson.

The A. B. "Banjo" Paterson Library at Sydney Grammar School was named after Paterson.

The Festival of Arts in Orange, New South Wales, presents a biennial Banjo Paterson Award for poetry and one-act plays and there is also an annual National Book Council Banjo Award. Orange also has an annual Banjo Paterson Poetry Festival.

In 1983, a rendition of "Waltzing Matilda" by country-and-western singer Slim Dusty was the first song broadcast by astronauts to Earth.

He topped the list of The Greatest of All - Our 50 Top Australians published in The Australian on 27 June 2013.

== Bibliography ==
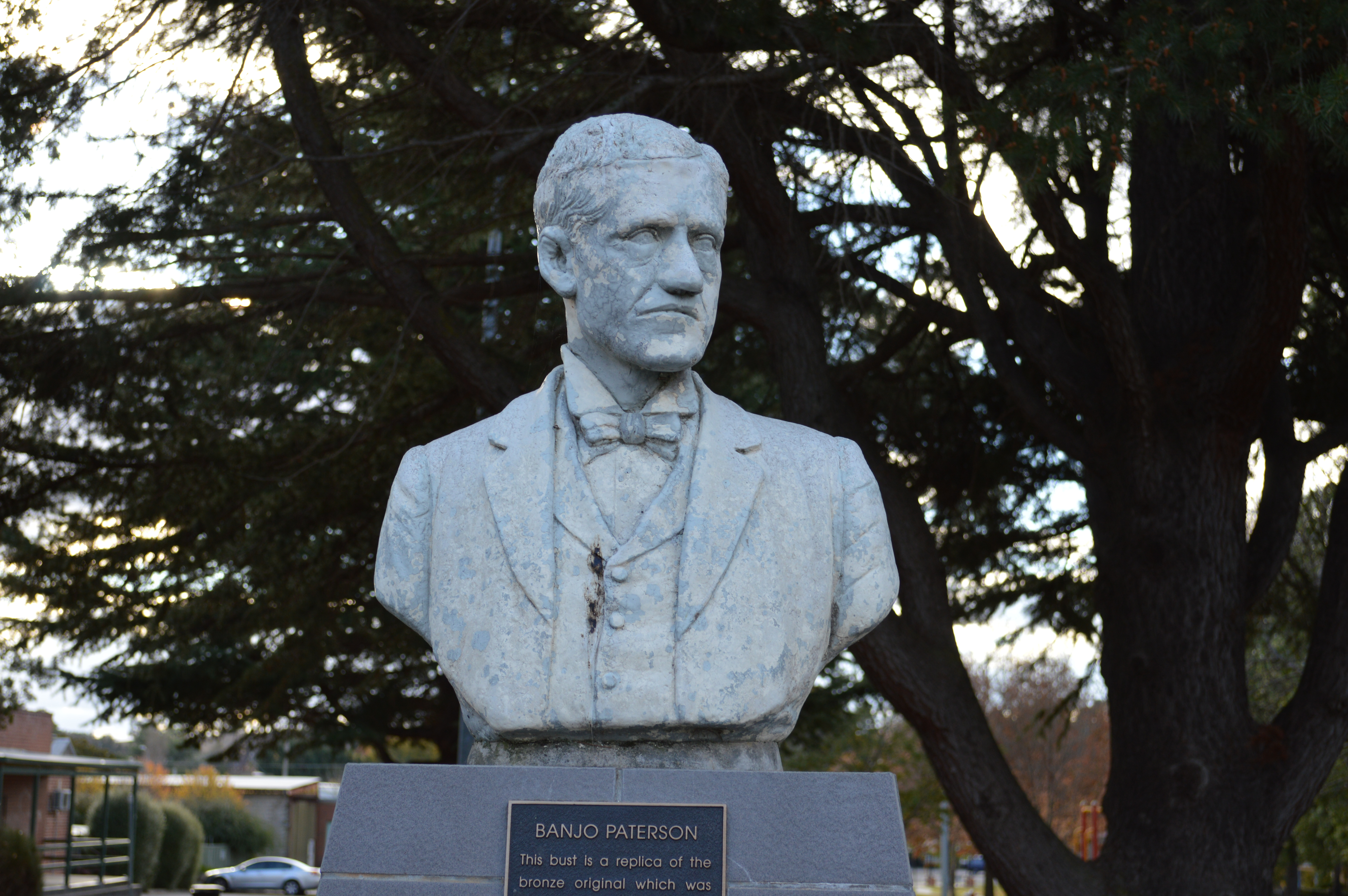
A bust of Paterson in Banjo Paterson Park, Yass, New South Wales

=== Collections ===
- The Man from Snowy River and Other Verses (1895)
- Rio Grande's Last Race and Other Verses (1902)
- Three Elephant Power and Other Stories (1917)
- Saltbush Bill, J.P., and Other Verses (1917)
- The Animals Noah Forgot (1933)
- Happy Dispatches (1934)
- The Man from Snowy River and Other Verses (1961)
- The World of 'Banjo' Paterson: His Stories, Travels, War Reports and Advice to Racegoers, edited by Clement Semmler (1967)
- Banjo Paterson's Horses: The Man from Snowy River, Father Riley's Horse, Story of Mongrel Grey (1970)
- Poems of Banjo Paterson (1974)
- Poems of Banjo Paterson : Volume Two (1976)
- The Best of Banjo Paterson compiled by Walter Stone (1977)
- Happy Dispatches: Journalistic Pieces from Banjo Paterson's days as a War Correspondent (1980)
- Banjo Paterson: Short Stories (1980)
- Banjo Paterson's Old Bush Songs edited by Graham Seal (1983)
- Banjo Paterson: A Children's Treasury (1984)
- The Banjo's Best-Loved Poems: Chosen by his Grand-Daughters compiled Rosamund Campbell and Philippa Harvie (1985)
- A. B. Paterson's Off Down the Track: racing and other yarns compiled Rosamund Campbell and Philippa Harvie (1986)
- Banjo Paterson's Poems of the Bush (1987)
- Banjo Paterson's People: selected poems and prose (1987)
- A Literary Heritage: 'Banjo' Paterson (1988)
- Banjo Paterson's Australians : Selected Poems and Prose (1989)
- A Vision Splendid: The Complete Poetry of A. B. 'Banjo' Paterson (1990)
- A. B. 'Banjo' Paterson: A Book of Verse (1990)
- Snowy River Riders: selected poems (1991)
- Selected Poems: A. B. Paterson compiled by Les Murray (1992)
- A. B. 'Banjo' Paterson: Bush Ballads, Poems, Stories and Journalism edited by Clement Semmler (1992)
- Banjo Paterson Favourites (1992)
- Singer of the Bush: The Poems of A. B. Paterson (1992)
- Selected Verse of 'Banjo' Paterson (1992)
- Banjo Paterson: His Poetry and Prose compiled by Richard Hall (1993)
- Favourite Poems of Banjo Paterson (1994)
- In the Droving Days compiled by Margaret Olds (1994)
- Under Sunny Skies (1994)
- Banjo's Animal Tales (1994)
- The Works of 'Banjo' Paterson (1996)
- The Best of Banjo Paterson compiled by Bruce Elder (1996)
- Banjo's Tall Tales (1998)
- From the Front : Being the Observations of Mr. A.B. (Banjo) Paterson: Special War Correspondent in South Africa: November 1899 to July 1900, for the Argus, the Sydney Mail, the Sydney Morning Herald edited by R. W. F. Droogleever (2000)
- Mulga Bill's Bicycle and Other Classics (2005)
- The Bush Poems of A. B. (Banjo) Paterson compiled by Jack Thompson (2008)
- The Battlefield Poems of A.B. (Banjo) Paterson compiled by Jack Thompson (2010)
- Banjo Paterson Treasury illustrated by Olso Davis (2013)
- Looking for Clancy: Ballads by A. B. 'Banjo' Paterson illustrated by Robert Ingpen (2013)
- Banjo Paterson Treasury (2013)

=== Novels ===
- An Outback Marriage (1900) (aka In No Man's Land)
- The Shearer's Colt (1936)

=== Selected individual works ===
==== Selected list of poems ====
| Title | Year | First published | Reprinted/collected in |
|---|---|---|---|
| "Clancy of the Overflow" | 1889 | The Bulletin, 21 December 1889 | The Man from Snowy River and Other Verses, Angus and Robertson, 1895, pp. 20-22 |
| "The Man from Snowy River" | 1890 | The Bulletin, 26 April 1890 | The Man from Snowy River and Other Verses, Angus and Robertson, 1895, pp. 3-9 |
| "On Kiley's Run" | 1890 | The Bulletin, 20 December 1890 | The Man from Snowy River and Other Verses, Angus and Robertson, 1895, pp. 80-85 |
| "Conroy's Gap" | 1890 | The Bulletin, 20 December 1890 | The Man from Snowy River and Other Verses, Angus and Robertson, 1895, pp. 23-30 |
| "The Daylight is Dying" | 1890 | The Australasian, 27 December 1890 | The Man from Snowy River and Other Verses, Angus and Robertson, 1895, pp. 153-155 |
| "In the Droving Days" | 1891 | The Bulletin, 20 June 1891 | The Man from Snowy River and Other Verses, Angus and Robertson, 1895, pp. 91-95 |
| "In Defence of the Bush" | 1892 | The Bulletin, 23 July 1892 | The Man from Snowy River and Other Verses, Angus and Robertson, 1895, pp. 156-159 |
| "The Man from Ironbark" | 1892 | The Bulletin, 17 December 1892 | The Man from Snowy River and Other Verses, Angus and Robertson, 1895, pp. 64-68 |
| "A Bushman's Song" | 1892 | The Bulletin, 24 December 1892 | The Man from Snowy River and Other Verses, Angus and Robertson, 1895, pp. 125-128 |
| "Black Swans" | 1893 | The Sydney Mail, 22 July 1893 | The Man from Snowy River and Other Verses, Angus and Robertson, 1895, pp. 113-116 |
| "The Geebung Polo Club" | 1893 | The Antipodean, 14 December 1893 | The Man from Snowy River and Other Verses, Angus and Robertson, 1895, pp. 43-46 |
| "A Bush Christening" | 1893 | The Bulletin, 16 December 1893 | The Man from Snowy River and Other Verses, Angus and Robertson, 1895, pp. 165-167 |
| "The Travelling Post Office" | 1894 | The Bulletin, 10 March 1894 | The Man from Snowy River and Other Verses, Angus and Robertson, 1895, pp. 47-49 |
| "Saltbush Bill" | 1894 | The Bulletin, 15 December 1894 | The Man from Snowy River and Other Verses, Angus and Robertson, 1895, pp. 50-55 |
| "Waltzing Matilda" | 1895 | | Saltbush Bill, J.P., and Other Verses, Angus and Robertson, 1917, pp. 23-24 |
| "Hay and Hell and Booligal" | 1896 | The Bulletin, 25 April 1896 | Rio Grande's Last Race and Other Verses, Angus and Robertson, 1902, pp. 39-41 |
| "Mulga Bill's Bicycle" | 1896 | The Sydney Mail, 25 July 1896 | Rio Grande's Last Race and Other Verses, Angus and Robertson, 1902, pp. 7-8 |
| "By the Grey Gulf-Water" | 1897 | The Bulletin, 11 December 1897 | Rio Grande's Last Race and Other Verses, Angus and Robertson, 1902, pp. 7-8 |
| "T.Y.S.O.N." | 1898 | The Australasian Pastoralists' Review, 15 December 1898 | Saltbush Bill, J.P., and Other Verses, Angus and Robertson, 1917, pp. 29-31 |
| "The Old Australian Ways" | 1902 | | Rio Grande's Last Race and Other Verses, Angus and Robertson, 1902, pp. 92-95 |

==== Selected list of short stories ====
| Title | Year | First published | Reprinted/collected in |
|---|---|---|---|
| "The Cast-Iron Canvasser" | 1891 | The Bulletin, 19 December 1891 | Three Elephant Power and Other Stories, Angus and Robertson, 1917, pp. 20-33 |

== Sources ==
- Notes on Author: Andrew Barton Paterson
- Australian Authors – A. B. ("Banjo") Paterson (1864–1941)
- "Banjo" Paterson
