= 1892 in Australian literature =

This article presents a list of the historical events and publications of Australian literature in 1892.

== Events ==
- 9 July - Henry Lawson kicks off the Bulletin Debate with the publication of his poem "Borderland", later retitled "Up the Country". "Banjo" Paterson and others replied.

== Books ==
- Fergus Hume — The Island of Fantasy: A Romance
- John Miller — The Workingman's Paradise: An Australian Labour Novel
- Hume Nisbet
  - The Bushranger's Sweetheart: An Australian Romance
  - The Divers: A Romance of Oceania
- Robert Potter
  - The Germ Growers
- Rosa Praed
  - December Roses: A Novel
  - The Romance of a Chalet

== Poetry ==
- Barcroft Boake
  - "An Allegory"
  - "At Devlin's Siding"
  - "Down the River"
  - "Jim's Whip"
- Jennings Carmichael – "The Old Bush Road"
- Victor J. Daley
  - "A-Roving"
  - "Cares"
- Edward Dyson
  - "Cleaning Up"
  - "The Fact of the Matter"
  - "The Old Whim Horse"
  - "Struck It At Last"
- George Essex Evans — "The Two Goblets"
- Sydney Jephcott — The Secrets of the South: Australian Poems
- Francis Kenna — "Banjo, of the Overflow"
- Henry Lawson
  - "The City Bushman"
  - "The Grog-an'-Grumble Steeplechase"
  - "The Poets of the Tomb"
  - "Up the Country"
  - "When Your Pants Begin to Go"
- Louisa Lawson
  - "A Birthday Wish"
  - "To a Bird"
- Breaker Morant — "Brigalow Mick"
- Henry Parkes — "Weary"
- A. B. Paterson
  - "In Answer to Various Bards"
  - "The Ballad of G.R. Dibbs"
  - "A Bushman's Song"
  - "In Defence of the Bush"
  - "The Man from Ironbark"

== Short stories ==
- John Arthur Barry — "Far Inland Football"
- Ernest Favenc
  - "How the Reverend Joseph Simmondsen Lost His Character"
  - "The Track of the Dead"
- E. W. Hornung - Under Two Skies: A Collection of Stories
- Henry Lawson
  - "Arvie Aspinall's Alarm Clock"
  - "The Bush Undertaker"
  - "A Day on a Selection"
  - "The Drover's Wife"
  - "In a Dry Season"
  - "A Visit of Condolence"
- Price Warung
  - "Beneath the Summer Sun"
  - "Bess O' the Rivers"
  - "The Heart-Breaking of Anstey's Bess"
  - "Parson Ford's Confessional"

== Births ==
A list, ordered by date of birth (and, if the date is either unspecified or repeated, ordered alphabetically by surname) of births in 1892 of Australian literary figures, authors of written works or literature-related individuals follows, including year of death.

- 18 March — William Hatfield, novelist (died 1969)
- 17 May — Leon Gellert, poet (died 1977)

Unknown date

- Elsie Clarice Cole, poet (died 1968)

== Deaths ==
A list, ordered by date of death (and, if the date is either unspecified or repeated, ordered alphabetically by surname) of deaths in 1892 of Australian literary figures, authors of written works or literature-related individuals follows, including year of birth.

- 2 May — Barcroft Boake, poet (born 1866)

== See also ==
- 1892 in Australia
- 1892 in literature
- 1892 in poetry
- List of years in Australian literature
- List of years in literature
