= In Answer to Various Bards =

1892 poem by Banjo Paterson

In Answer to Various Bards (a.k.a. An Answer to Various Bards) is a poem by Australian writer and poet Andrew Barton "Banjo" Paterson. It was first published in The Bulletin magazine on 1 October 1892 in reply to fellow poet Henry Lawson's poem, In Answer to "Banjo", and Otherwise.

In Up The Country, Lawson had criticised "City Bushmen" such as Banjo Paterson who tended to romanticise bush life. Paterson, in turn, accused Lawson of representing bush life as nothing but doom and gloom, famously ending with the line "For the bush will never suit you, and you'll never suit the bush."

This exchange sparked what is known as the Bulletin Debate, mainly between Paterson and Lawson, but also including Edward Dyson and Francis Kenna.

== Reception ==
Writing in The Advertiser, in a review of Saltbush Bill, J.P., and Other Verses, a reviewer states: "The 'note of melancholy' which Marcus Clarke and other writers have found in the bush does not appeal to him [Paterson], and he has set out his attitude in regard to the 'dismal' tribe in 'an answer to various bards,' which appears in this volume."

== Further publications ==
- Saltbush Bill, J.P., and Other Verses by A. B. Paterson, 1917
- The Collected Verse of A. B. Paterson : Containing 'The Man from Snowy River', 'Rio Grande' and 'Saltbush Bill, M.P.' , 1921
- Singer of the Bush, A. B. (Banjo) Paterson : Complete Works 1885-1900 edited by Rosamund Campbell and Philippa Harvie, Lansdowne, 1983
- The Penguin Book of Australian Satirical Verse edited by Philip Neilsen, Penguin, 1986
- A Vision Splendid: The Complete Poetry of A. B. 'Banjo' Paterson, Angus and Robertson, 1990
- The Macmillan Anthology of Australian Literature edited by Ken L. Goodwin and Alan Lawson, Macmillan, 1990
- Selected Poems : A. B. Paterson edited by Les Murray, 1992
- The Collected Verse of A. B. Paterson : Containing 'The Man from Snowy River', 'Rio Grande' and 'Saltbush Bill, M.P.' , Angus and Robertson, 1921
- Banjo Paterson : His Poetry and Prose by Richard Hall, Allen & Unwin, 1993
- The Sting in the Wattle : Australian Satirical Verse edited by Philip Neilsen, University of Queensland Press, 1993

== See also ==
- 1892 in poetry
- 1892 in literature
- 1892 in Australian literature
- Australian literature
