= A Voice from the Town =

1894 poem by Banjo Paterson

- by Banjo Paterson
- First published in: The Bulletin
- Country: Australia
- Language: English
- Publication date: 20 October 1894
- Lines: 72

Full text
- A Voice from the Town at Wikisource

A Voice from the Town is a poem by Australian writer and poet Andrew Barton "Banjo" Paterson. It was first published in The Bulletin magazine on 20 October 1894.

In Up The Country, Lawson had criticised "The City Bushman" such as Banjo Paterson who tended to romanticise bush life. Paterson, in turn, accused Lawson of representing bush life as nothing but doom and gloom, famously ending with the line "For the bush will never suit you, and you'll never suit the bush."

This exchange sparked what is known as the Bulletin Debate, mainly between Paterson and Lawson, but also including Edward Dyson and Francis Kenna.

This poem appeared two years after "The Poets of the Tomb" by Henry Lawson, the previous poem in the debate, and brought the exercise to an end. An author's note stated that it had been written in response to the 1871 poem "A Voice from the Bush", written by Mowbray Morris.

== Further publications ==
- The Man from Snowy River and Other Verses by Banjo Paterson (1895)
- Singer of the Bush, A. B. (Banjo) Paterson : Complete Works 1885-1900 edited by Rosamund Campbell and Philippa Harvie (1983)
- A Vision Splendid : The Complete Poetry of A. B. 'Banjo' Paterson (1990)

== See also ==
- 1894 in poetry
- 1894 in literature
- 1894 in Australian literature
- Australian literature
