= The Old Bush Road =

Poem by Australian writer Jennings Carmichael

- by Jennings Carmichael
- Written: 1892
- First published in: The Australasian
- Country: Australia
- Language: English

Full text
- An Old Bush Road at Wikisource

"The Old Bush Road" (1892) (aka ("An Old Bush Road") is a poem by Australian poet Jennings Carmichael.

It was originally published in The Australasian on 23 April 1892 and subsequently reprinted in Poems, the author's sole poetry collection, other newspapers and periodicals and a number of Australian poetry anthologies. The poem is also known by the title "An Old Road".

== Critical reception ==
While reviewing the author's poetry collection, Poems, a writer in The Australasian observed that Jennings had made the subject of "charmingly poetical" all her own: "It deals with the Australian bush as seen in the tender light of a loving memory that goes back to girlhood's days, and amid the city's growl and grime catches faint breaths of the gum forest at evening, hears the magpies fluting their tumultuous welcome to the dawn, or follows in fancy every winding of the 'old bush road' as it passes round the clumps of wattles, or over the creek where the bell-birds haunt, or skirts the marsh where the mosses grow in their redness, and the swan, the bittern, and the curlew dwell."

== Publication history ==
After the poem's initial publication in The Australasian it was reprinted as follows:

- Poems by Jennings Carmichael, Melville Mullen and Slade, 1895
- An Anthology of Australian Verse edited by Bertram Stevens, Angus and Robertson, 1907
- Selections from the Australian Poets edited by Bertram Stevens, Cornstalk Publishing, 1913
- A Treasury of Colonial Poetry, Currawong, 1982
- Australian Bush Poems, Axiom, 1991

== See also ==
- 1892 in Australian literature
- 1892 in poetry
