= The Poets of the Tomb =

1892 poem by Henry Lawson

- by Henry Lawson
- Written: 1892
- First published in: The Bulletin
- Country: Australia
- Language: English
- Series: The Bulletin Debate
- Publication date: 8 October 1892

Full text
- The Poets of the Tomb at Wikisource

The Poets of the Tomb is a poem by Australian writer and poet Henry Lawson. It was first published in The Bulletin magazine on 8 October 1892 in reply to fellow poet Andrew Barton "Banjo" Paterson's poem, In Answer to Various Bards.

In Up The Country, Lawson had criticised "The City Bushman" such as Banjo Paterson who tended to romanticise bush life. Paterson, in turn, accused Lawson of representing bush life as nothing but doom and gloom, famously ending with the line "For the bush will never suit you, and you'll never suit the bush."

This exchange sparked what is known as the Bulletin Debate, mainly between Paterson and Lawson, but also including Edward Dyson and Francis Kenna.

This poem ended the first phase of the debate because, as Paterson observed in 1939, the poets "...ran out of material."

== Reception ==
The Oxford Companion to Australian Literature said of the poem that it "...widened the discussion to include the role of literature in reforming the total Australian society..."

== Further publications ==
- In the Days When the World was Wide and Other Verses by Henry Lawson, 1896
- Humorous Verses by Henry Lawson, Angus and Robertson, 1941
- Freedom on the Wallaby : Poems of the Australian People edited by Marjorie Pizer, Pinchgut Press, 1953
- A Campfire Yarn : Henry Lawson Complete Works 1885-1900 edited by Leonard Cronin, Lansdowne, 1984

== See also ==
- 1892 in poetry
- 1892 in literature
- Australian literature
