= The Penguin Book of Australian Satirical Verse =

1986 poetry anthology edited by Philip Neilsen

- Author: Philip Neilsen
- Language: English
- Genre: Poetry anthology
- Publisher: Penguin
- Publication date: 1986
- Publication place: Australia
- Media type: Print
- Pages: 298 pp.
- ISBN: 0140585591

The Penguin Book of Australian Satirical Verse is an anthology of Australian poetry edited and introduced by Philip Neilsen, published by Penguin in 1986.

The collection contains 152 poems, from a number of authors and sources.

== Contents ==
- "Alas; Poor Botany Bay", Anonymous
- "A Convict's Tour of Hell", Francis MacNamara
- "'Where'er the Sickning Muse'", William Charles Wentworth
- "Impromptu", William Charles Wentworth
- "Ode to Tallow", A. T.
- "From K.C.B. : An Epitaph for Sir Charles Hotham", R. H. Horne
- "Song of the Squatters", Robert Lowe
- "Songs of the Squatters (No.3.)", Robert Lowe
- "Two Satires on the Gladstone Colony : 1 (North Australia : [In Rhyme])", Robert Lowe
- "Two Satires on the Gladstone Colony : 2 (Inscription on the Monument Proposed To Be Erected on the Spot Where Colonel * "Barney Landed at Port Curtis)", Robert Lowe
- "The Beautiful Squatter", Charles Harpur
- "Squatter Song : Bush Justice", Charles Harpur
- "Marvellous Martin - II", Charles Harpur
- "Canto First (from The Patriot of Australia - an Heroic Poem in Ten Cantos)", Charles Harpur
- "Lines Suggested by a Newly Invented Sort of Pickle-Dish", Charles Harpur
- "Impromptu", Charles Harpur
- "A Republican's Creed", Charles Harpur
- From : "The Temple of Infamy (Marvellous Martin I)", Charles Harpur
- "The Devil and the Governor : A Dramatic Sketch", 'Sylvanus'
- From : "The Genius and the Ghost", William Forster
- "The Squatter of the Olden Time", Anonymous
- "The Fierce and Bloody Battle of the Weddin Mountains", Damphool Jnr
- "Private Despatch of Captain Bumble of the 40th Stationed at Ballarat to His Excellency Sir Charles Hotham (Captain Bumble's Letter),", Charles Thatcher
- "The Song of Ninian Melville", Henry Kendall
- "The Gagging Bill", 'A Mopoke'
- "[Untitled]", Henry Kendall
- "[Untitled]", Henry Kendall
- "Fashion", Ada Cambridge
- "James Twycer", Thos. E. Spencer
- "My Sundowner", John Farrell
- "When London Calls", Victor J. Daley
- "Correggio Jones", Victor J. Daley
- "A Treat for the London Poor", Victor J. Daley
- "The Model Journalist", Victor J. Daley
- "The Call for Kipling", Victor J. Daley
- "Narcissus and Some Tadpoles", Victor J. Daley
- "Two of a Trade", Victor J. Daley
- "Faith (Quatrains : 5 : Finis)", Victor J. Daley
- "To J.D. Fitzgerald", Victor J. Daley
- "In Defence of the Bush", A. B. Paterson
- "The Ballad of G.R. Dibbs", A. B. Paterson
- "In Defence of the Bush : An Answer to Various Bards", A. B. Paterson
- "Now Listen to Me and I'll Tell You My Views", A. B. Paterson
- "It's Grand to Be a Squatter (It's Grand)", A. B. Paterson
- "Butchered to Make a Dutchman's Holiday", Breaker Morant
- "The Hanging Judge", Alfred George Stephens
- "The Cow", Bernard O'Dowd
- "Middleton's Rouseabout", Henry Lawson
- "Ballad of Mabel Clare : An Australian Story to be Read and Sung Hereafter", Henry Lawson
- "Borderland", Henry Lawson
- "In Answer to "Banjo," and Otherwise", Henry Lawson
- "The Man from Waterloo (With kind regards to 'Banjo')", Henry Lawson
- "Australian Bards and Bush Reviewers", Henry Lawson
- "Ripperty! Kye! Ahoo!", Henry Lawson
- "Mrs Grundy Goes Into the Question", Anonymous
- "Much Distressed", Anonymous
- "King George V", Charles Wiltens Andree Hayward
- "The White Man's Burden", J. K. McDougall
- "Apples", 'Dryblower'
- "Frank Hann-Guish : An 'Orrible Tale of Gore", 'Dryblower'
- From "Apollo in George Street : A Satire", David McKee Wright
- "The Martyred Democrat", C. J. Dennis
- "Bump Me Into Parliament", Bill Casey
- "The Digger's London Leave", Anonymous
- "The Man Who Waters the Workers' Beer", Anonymous
- "Nursery Rhyme", Furnley Maurice
- "Ottawar! An Ode in Humbug", Furnley Maurice
- "Work-Girl's Holiday", Lesbia Harford
- "Skirt Machinist", Lesbia Harford
- "Miss Mary (Miss Mary Fairfax)", Lesbia Harford
- "Organised", Russ Singleton
- "The Loyalist", Russ Singleton
- "The Richest Man in Rookwood", Russ Singleton
- "Foreign Policy", Ian R. Maxwell
- "Advice to Psychologists", Kenneth Slessor
- "Vesper-Song of the Reverend Samuel Marsden", Kenneth Slessor
- "An Inscription for Dog River", Kenneth Slessor
- "Evolution", Kenneth Slessor
- "Policeman of the Lord : A Political Satire (The Lampoon)", P. R. Stephensen
- "Benelong Returns to Heaven", E. O. Schlunke
- "Conquistador", A. D. Hope
- "To Julia Walking Away", A. D. Hope
- "The Brides", A. D. Hope
- "The Messenger of the Goddess Dullness Describes to the Immortals the Inhabitants of New Holland – the 'Lost Heirs of Dullness'", A. D. Hope
- "The Effect of the Radio on New Holland and Culture Described (from Dunciad Minor : An Heroick Poem : Book III)", A. D. Hope
- "The State of Modern Literary Studies in the Universities Described (from Dunciad Minor : An Heroick Poem : Book III)", A. D. Hope
- "Inscription for a War", A. D. Hope
- "[Untitled] (from Sir Galahad and Co.)", Harry Hooton
- "University Council Song", Beth Gott
- "Retrial", Swilliam
- "I Wouldn't be Lord Mayor", Ian Mudie
- "Retreat of a Pioneer", Ian Mudie
- "Doctor Black", John Blight
- "[Untitled]", Douglas Stewart
- "Night at the Opera", Dorothy Auchterlonie
- "Madame Butterfly at Nagasaki", Dorothy Auchterlonie
- "The Australian Dream", David Campbell
- "The Bunyip and the Whistling Kettle", J. S. Manifold
- "Makhno's Philosophers", J. S. Manifold
- "Walking Race on Hampstead Heath", David Martin
- "Dirge for a Press Lord", David Martin
- "Unsolicited Sonnet to a Sydney Policeman", David Martin
- "[Untitled] (from Rob the Robber)", David Martin
- "Jindyworobaksheesh", James McAuley
- "Culture as Exhibit", 'Ern Malley'
- "Australian Film Studio", Muir Holburn
- "The Denunciad : Part 1 - De Profundis", Alister Kershaw
- "The Tantanoola Tiger", Max Harris
- "Part II (from Don Juan in Melanesia)", Peter Lawrence
- "Part III (from Don Juan in Melanesia)", Peter Lawrence
- "Our Leisured Ladies", Geoffrey Dutton
- "The Wild Colonial Don", R. F. Brissenden
- "The Death of the Devil", R. A. Simpson
- "All Friends Together : A Survey of Present-Day Australian Poetry", R. A. Simpson
- "Phar Lap in the Melbourne Museum", Peter Porter
- "Sex and the Over Forties", Peter Porter
- "Mort aux Chats", Peter Porter
- "Enter Without So Much as Knocking", Bruce Dawe
- "The Not-So-Good Earth", Bruce Dawe
- "News from Judaea", Bruce Dawe
- "Which One's the Dog", Bruce Dawe
- "Testimonials : A Ballad for the Subliminal Age", Bruce Dawe
- "Birth Rite", Bruce Dawe
- "Deathbed Sketch (for an Unnamed Portrait, Signed)", Vivian Smith
- "Health Farm", David Malouf
- "Mythologies", David Malouf
- "A Financier's Epitaph (A Financier's Obituary)", Rodney Hall
- "Question and Answer : Imperial Style", Rodney Hall
- "In the System : II : 'These Subversives, These Friends of the Dirt'", Thomas Shapcott
- "In the System : II : "The Joyner Act" : A Queensland Text", Thomas Shapcott
- "Rostered Duty", Les Murray
- "The Canberra Suburbs' Infinite Extension", Les Murray
- "The Swarm", Les Murray
- "A Gesture Towards James Joyce", Clive James
- "Will Those Responsible Come Forward?", Clive James
- "The Book of My Enemy Has Been Remaindered", Clive James
- "The New Academy", Geoffrey Lehmann
- "Christ at Gallipoli", Geoff Page
- "An Ode", Julian Croft
- "Note / to a Friend / on a Commune", Nigel Roberts
- "Ode to Col Joye", John Tranter
- "Bob Hawke Replies", Graham Rowlands
- "Bulldozer Driver", Graham Rowlands
- "Endsight", Michael Dransfield
- "Colonial Poet", Michael Dransfield
- "The Jubilee Cakewalk", Robyn Archer
- "Snow White", J. S. Harry
- "The Bushranger Comes Home", Philip Neilsen
- "The Hangman", Philip Neilsen
- "Son of Dracula", Philip Neilsen
- "Bush Lullaby", Philip Neilsen
- "Mangoes (for Robyn Ravlich)", Richard Tipping

== Critical reception ==
Reviewing the anthology for The Age newspaper critic Peter Pierce quoted the editor by stating that, prior to this publication, one of "the strongest traditions in Australian verse has been greatly neglected." He then notes that "the editor's redress will be to individual poets...whose satirical output was suppressed or ignored, rather than to a 'tradition' whose outlines and impact cannot easily be defined."

== See also ==
- 1986 in Australian literature
