= Middleton's Rouseabout =

Poem by Henry Lawson

- by Henry Lawson
- First published in: The Freeman's Journal, 8 March 1890
- Country: Australia
- Language: English
- Publication date: 1890
- Lines: 28

Full text
- Middleton's Rouseabout at Wikisource

"Middleton's Rouseabout" is a poem by Australian poet Henry Lawson. It was first published in The Freeman's Journal on 8 March 1890, and later in the poet's collections and other Australian poetry anthologies.

== Outline ==
This is the story of Andy, who starts out as Middleton's rouseabout and ends up buying the station after Middleton succumbs to "liquor and drought". Though he stil doesn't have any opinions or "idears".

== Analysis ==
In his commentary on the poem in 60 Classic Australian Poems Geoff Page described it as "very much a political poem in a very political era". He also notes that Lawson in just 28 lines "has given us an emblematic story for which some novelists would need 300 pages."

== Further publications ==
- In the Days When the World was Wide and Other Verses by Henry Lawson, 1896
- An Anthology of Australian Verse edited by Bertram Stevens, Angus and Robertson, 1907
- The Freeman's Journal, 5 December 1912
- Selected Poems of Henry Lawson by Henry Lawson, Angus and Robertson, 1918
- Out Back and Other Poems by Henry Lawson, W. H. Honey, 1943
- Silence Into Song : An Anthology of Australian Verse edited by Clifford O'Brien, Rigby, 1968
- The Penguin Book of Australian Verse edited by Harry Heseltine, Penguin Books, 1972
- The World of Henry Lawson edited by Walter Stone, Hamlyn, 1974
- The Essential Henry Lawson : The Best Works of Australia's Greatest Writer edited Brian Kiernan, Currey O'Neil, 1982
- A Treasury of Colonial Poetry, Currawong, 1982
- A Campfire Yarn : Henry Lawson Complete Works 1885-1900 edited by Leonard Cronin, Lansdowne, 1984
- Cross-Country : A Book of Australian Verse edited by John Barnes and Brian MacFarlane, Heinemann, 1984
- My Country : Australian Poetry and Short Stories, Two Hundred Years edited by Leonie Kramer, Lansdowne, 1985
- Henry Lawson : An Illustrated Treasury edited by Glenys Smith, Lansdowne, 1985
- The Penguin Book of Australian Satirical Verse edited by Philip Neilsen, Penguin, 1986
- A Collection of Australian Bush Verse Peter Antill-Rose, 1989
- Australian Bush Poems, Axiom, 1991
- A Treasury of Bush Verse edited by G. A. Wilkes, Angus and Robertson, 1991
- The Penguin Book of Australian Ballads edited by Elizabeth Webby and Philip Butterss, Penguin, 1993
- The Romance of the Stockman: The Lore, Legend and Literature of Australia's Outback Heroes, Viking O'Neill, 1993
- The Penguin Book of 19th Century Australian Literature edited by Michael Ackland, Penguin, 1993
- Australian Verse : An Oxford Anthology edited by John Leonard, Oxford University Press, 1998
- Classic Australian Verse edited by Maggie Pinkney, Five Mile Press, 2001
- Henry Lawson edited by Geoffrey Blainey, Text Publishing, 2002
- Our Country : Classic Australian Poetry : From Colonial Ballads to Paterson & Lawson edited by Michael Cook, Little Hills Press, 2002
- The Penguin Anthology of Australian Poetry edited by John Kinsella, Penguin, 2009
- 60 Classic Australian Poems edited by Geoff Page, University of NSW Press, 2009
- The Puncher & Wattmann Anthology of Australian Poetry edited by John Leonard, Puncher & Wattmann, 2009
- Australian Poetry Since 1788 edited by Geoffrey Lehmann and Robert Gray, University of NSW Press, 2011

== Note ==
The "Andy" of this poem is not the same as the "Andy" of Lawson's poem "Andy's Gone with Cattle".

== See also ==
- 1890 in poetry
- 1890 in Australian literature
- Australian literature
