= The Fact of the Matter =

1892 poem by Edward Dyson

- by Edward Dyson
- Written: 1892
- First published in: The Bulletin
- Country: Australia
- Language: English
- Publisher: The Bulletin
- Publication date: 30 July 1892

Full text
- The Fact of the Matter at Wikisource

The Fact of the Matter (also known as 'The drovers in reply') is a poem by prolific Australian writer and poet Edward Dyson (1865–1931). It was first published in The Bulletin magazine on 30 July 1892 in reply to fellow poets Henry Lawson and Banjo Paterson. This poem formed part of the Bulletin Debate, a series of poems by Lawson, Paterson, and others, about the true nature of life in the Australian bush.

== Background ==
In 'Up The Country' (9 July 1892) Lawson had criticised 'city bushmen' such as Banjo Paterson who tended to romanticise bush life. Paterson, in turn, in 'In Defence of the Bush' (23 July 1892) accused Lawson of representing bush life as nothing but doom and gloom. Dyson, who grew up in Ballarat, Victoria, working from an early age in the mines and on the land before moving to Melbourne, sided with Lawson, expressing the view that those who glorified country life should go and live there.

== Original version ==
The four-line ten-stanza poem, making reference to some of Paterson's own phrases, first appeared as:

I’m wonderin' why those fellers who go buildin' chipper ditties,
'Bout the rosy times out drovin', an' the dust an' death of cities,
Don't sling the bloomin' office, strike some drover for a billet,
And soak up all the glory that comes handy while they fill it.

P’r’aps it’s fun to travel cattle or to picnic with merinos,
But the drover don’t catch on, sir, not much high-class rapture he knows.
As for sleepin' on the plains there in the shadder of the spear-grass,
That’s liked best by the Juggins with a spring-bed an' a pier-glass.

An' the camp fire, an' the freedom, and the blanky constellations,
The 'possum-rug an' billy, an' the togs an' stale ole rations—
It’s strange they’re only raved about by coves that dress up pretty,
An' sport a wife, an' live on slap-up tucker in the city.

I’ve tickled beef in my time clear from Clarke to Riverina,
An' shifted sheep all round the shop, but blow me if I’ve seen a
Single blanky hand who didn’t buck at pleasures of this kidney,
And wouldn’t trade his blisses for a flutter down in Sydney.

Night-watches are delightful when the stars are really splendid
To the chap who’s fresh upon the job, but, you bet, his rapture’s ended
When the rain comes down in sluice-heads, or the cuttin' hailstones pelter,
An' the sheep drift off before the wind, an' the horses strike for shelter.

Don’t take me for a howler, but I find it come annoyin'
To hear these fellers rave about the pleasures we're enjoyin',
When p’r’aps we’ve nothin' better than some fluky water handy,
An' they’re right on all the lickers—rum, an' plenty beer an' brandy.

The town is dusty, may be, but it isn’t worth the curses
'Side the dust a feller swallers an' the blinded thirst he nurses
When he’s on the hard macadam, where the jumbucks cannot browse, an'
The wind is in his whiskers, an' he follers twenty thousan'.

This drovin' on the plain, too, it’s all O.K. when the weather
Isn’t hot enough to curl the soles right off your upper leather,
Or so cold that when the mornin' wind comes hissin' through the grasses
You can feel it cut your eyelids like a whip-lash as it passes.

Then there’s bull-ants in the blankets, an' a lame horse, an' muskeeters,
An' a D.T. boss like Halligan, or one like Humpy Peters,
Who is mean about the tucker, an' can curse from start to sundown,
An' can fight like fifty devils, an' whose growler’s never run down.

Yes, I wonder why the fellers what go buildin' chipper ditties
'Bout the rosy times out drovin' an' the dust an' death of cities,
Don't sling the bloomin' office, strike ole Peters for a billet,
An' soak up all the glory that comes handy while they fill it.

== 1896 variation ==
By 1896 the poem was reworded and renamed 'The drovers in reply' and appeared in Dyson's first anthology Rhymes from the Mines and Other Lines in 1896:

We are wondering why those fellows who are writing cheerful ditties
Of the rosy times out droving, and the dust and death of cities,
Do not leave the dreary office, ask a drover for a billet,
And enjoy 'the views,’ 'the campfires,’ and 'the freedom' while they fill it.

If it’s fun to travel cattle or to picnic with merinoes,
Well the drover doesn't see it—few poetic raptures he knows.
As for sleeping on the plains beneath "the pale moon" always seen there,
That is most appreciated by the man who’s never been there.

And the "balmy air", the horses, and the 'wondrous constellations,’
The 'possum-rugs, and billies, and the tough and musty rations,
It's strange they only please the swell in urban streets residing,
Where the trams are always handy if he has a taste for riding.

We have travelled far with cattle for the very best of reasons—
For a living—we’ve gone droving in all latitudes and seasons,
But have never had a mate content with pleasures of this kidney,
And who wouldn't change his blisses for a flutter down in Sydney.

Night-watches are delightful when the stars are really splendid
To the sentimental stranger, but his joy is quickly ended
When the rain comes down in sluice-heads, or the cutting hailstones pelter,
And the sheep drift with the blizzard, and the horses bolt for shelter.

Don't imagine we are soured, but it's peculiarly annoying
To be told by city writers of the pleasures we're enjoying,
When perhaps we've nothing better than some fluky water handy,
Whilst the scribes in showy bar-rooms take iced seltzer with their brandy.

The dust in town is nothing to the dust the drover curses,
And the dust a drover swallows, and the awful thirst he nurses
When he's on the hard macadam, where the wethers cannot browse, and
The sirocco drives right at him, and he follows twenty thousand.

This droving on the plain is really charming when the weather
Isn't hot enough to curl the soles right off your upper leather,
Or so cold that when the morning wind comes hissing through the grasses
You can feel it cut your eyelids like a whip-lash as it passes.

There are bull-ants in the blankets, wicked horses, cramps, and 'skeeters,’
And a drinking boss like Halligan, or one like Humpy Peters,
Who is mean about the rations, and a flowing stream of curses
From the break of day to camping, through good fortune and reverses.

Yes, we wonder why the fellows who are building chipper ditties
Of the rosy times out droving and the dust and death of cities,
Do not quit the stuffy office, ask old Peters for a billet,
And enjoy the stars, the camp-fires, and the freedom while they fill it.

== See also ==
- 1892 in poetry
- 1892 in literature
- 1892 in Australian literature
- Australian literature
