= In the Days When the World was Wide and Other Verses =

First book of poems by Henry Lawson

In the Days When the World Was Wide and Other Verses
- 1970 edition (publ. Lloyd O'Neil)
- Author: Henry Lawson
- Language: English
- Genre: Bush poetry
- Publisher: Angus and Robertson
- Publication date: 1896
- Publication place: Australia
- Media type: Print (hardback & paperback)
- Pages: 234pp
- Preceded by: While the Billy Boils
- Followed by: Verses, Popular and Humorous

In the Days When the World Was Wide and Other Verses (1896) is the first collection of poems by Australian poet and author Henry Lawson. It was released in hardback by Angus and Robertson in 1896, and features the poet's widely anthologised poems "The Free Selector's Daughter", "Andy's Gone with Cattle", "Middleton's Rouseabout" and the best of Lawson's contributions to The Bulletin Debate, a famous dispute in The Bulletin magazine from 1892-93 between Lawson and Banjo Paterson.

The collection contains a dedication to J. F. Archibald and on the title page a sketch by Frank Mahony of Lawson 'humping his bluey'.

== Contents ==
- "To an Old Mate"
- "In the Days When the World Was Wide"
- "Faces in the Street"
- "The Roaring Days"
- "'For'ard'"
- "The Drover's Sweetheart"
- "Out Back"
- "The Free-Selector's Daughter"
- "'Sez You'"
- "Andy's Gone with Cattle"
- "Jack Dunn of Nevertire"
- "Trooper Campbell"
- "The Sliprails and the Spur"
- "Past Carin'"
- "The Glass on the Bar"
- "The Shanty on the Rise"
- "The Vagabond"
- "Sweeney"
- "Middleton's Rouseabout"
- "The Ballad of the Drover"
- "Taking His Chance"
- "When the 'Army' Prays for Watty"
- "The Wreck of the 'Derry Castle'"
- "Ben Duggan"
- "The Star of Australasia"
- "The Great Grey Plain"
- "The Song of Old Joe Swallow"
- "Corny Bill"
- "Cherry-Tree Inn"
- "Up the Country"
- "Knocked Up"
- "The Blue Mountains"
- "The City Bushman"
- "Eurunderee"
- "Mount Bukaroo"
- "The Fire at Ross's Farm"
- "The Teams"
- "Cameron's Heart"
- "The Shame of Going Back"
- "Since Then"
- "Peter Anderson and Co."
- "When the Children Come Home"
- "Dan, the Wreck"
- "A Prouder Man Than You"
- "The Song and the Sigh"
- "The Cambaroora Star"
- "After All"
- "Marshall's Mate"
- "The Poets of the Tomb"
- "Australian Bards and Bush Reviewers"
- "The Ghost"

== Critical reception ==
A reviewer in The Evening News (Sydney), on the original publication, noted that "What is best in Mr. Lawson's verse is its genuine local color, to employ a much misused but, in this case, strictly appropriate, phrase. Where he is strongest, most picturesque, and most poetical, he is unmistakably Australian — a man really influenced by his surroundings, and expressing himself in that natural way which is essential to the production of a true poetic note of any kind.

In the Australian Town and Country Journal the reviewer concluded that "What Kipling has done for "Tommy Atkins" in the great Indian colony, Lawson has done for the silent wanderer on the dreary Australia plains, giving voice to many a dumb heart, and translating its unbroken emotions into verse in such songs as "A Prouder Man than You," "The Shame of Going Back," "Since Then" and "Sez You.""

== See also ==
- 1896 in Australian literature
- 1896 in poetry
