= An Anthology of Australian Verse =

1906 poetry anthology by Bertram Stevens

- Title page for An Anthology of Australian Verse (1906)
- Author: Bertram Stevens
- Language: English
- Genre: Poetry anthology
- Publisher: Angus and Robertson
- Publication date: 1906
- Publication place: Australia
- Media type: Print
- Pages: 299pp
- Preceded by: –
- Followed by: The Australia Birthday Book

An Anthology of Australian Verse (1906) is an anthology of poems edited by Australian critic Bertram Stevens. The editor notes in his introduction that the book is "A selection of published and previously unpublished verse" representative of the best short poems written by Australians or inspired by Australian scenery and conditions of life, - 'Australian' in this connection being used to include New Zealand.' It has been noted as the first national anthology of Australian poetry.

== Critical reception ==
A reviewer in The Leader noted that the anthology "will be gratefully received by those who are willing to acknowledge that there are sweet strains worth remembrance among the vast volume of minor poetry. If a critical judgment may cavil at the inclusion of some who have been awarded this distinction, the plea may be urged that we know not the mass of rejection." And concluded "On the whole, the work of selection has been well done, and the editor may be complimented on the discretion and critical taste he has displayed. "

In The Western Mail a reviewer was unequivocal: "This is perhaps the most serious effort that has yet been made to compile an anthology of Australian poetry, and not until many years shall have passed, and a greater store of poetic material shall have been acquired, will the publication be superseded. It is beyond doubt the best of its kind that has yet appeared, and for this result the able editor deserves more than a passing word of thanks. The best writers are, so far as it is possible to average the general taste, represented by their best work, and most poems that have earned a justified popular favour, have, where length has permitted, been included."

== Contents ==
- William Charles Wentworth
  - "Australasia"
- Charles Harpur
  - "Love"
  - "Words"
  - "A Coast View"
- William Forster
  - "The Love in Her Eyes Lay Sleeping"
- James Lionel Michael
  - "Through Pleasant Paths'"
  - "Personality"
- Daniel Henry Deniehy
  - "Love in a Cottage"
  - "A Song for the Night"
- Richard Rowe
  - "Superstites Rosae"
  - "Soul Ferry"
- Sir Henry Parkes
  - "The Buried Chief"
- Thomas Alexander Browne ("Rolf Boldrewood")
  - "Perdita"
- Adam Lindsay Gordon
  - "A Dedication"
  - "Thora's Song"
  - "The Sick Stockrider"
- Henry Kendall
  - "Prefatory Sonnets: I"
  - "Prefatory Sonnets: II"
  - "September in Australia"
  - "Rose Lorraine"
  - "To a Mountain"
  - "Araluen"
  - "After Many Years"
  - "Hy-Brasil"
  - "Outre Mer"
- Marcus Clarke
  - "The Song of Tigilau"
- Patrick Moloney
  - "Melbourne"
- Alfred Domett
  - "An Invitation"
  - "A Maori Girl's Song"
- James Brunton Stephens
  - "The Dominion of Australia"
  - "The Dark Companion"
  - "Day"
  - "Night"
- Thomas Bracken
  - "Not Understood"
  - "Spirit of Song"
- Ada Cambridge
  - "What of the Night?"
  - "Good-Bye"
  - "The Virgin Martyr"
  - "Honour"
  - "Despair"
  - "Faith"
- Alexander Bathgate
  - "The Clematis"
- Philip Joseph Holdsworth
  - "Quis Separabit?"
  - "My Queen of Dreams"
- Mary Hannay Foott
  - "Where the Pelican Builds"
  - "New Country"
  - "No Message"
  - "Happy Days"
- Henry Lea Twisleton
  - "To a Cabbage Rose"
- Mrs. James Glenny Wilson
  - "Fairyland"
  - "A Winter Daybreak"
  - "The Lark's Song"
- Edward Booth Loughran
  - "Dead Leaves"
  - "Isolation"
  - "Ishmonie"
- John Liddell Kelly
  - "Immortality"
  - "Heredity"
- Robert Richardson
  - "A Ballade of Wattle Blossom"
  - "A Song"
- James Lister Cuthbertson
  - "Australia Federata"
  - "At Cape Schanck"
  - "Wattle and Myrtle"
  - "The Australian Sunrise"
- John Farrell
  - "Australia to England"
- Arthur Patchett Martin
  - "Bushland"
- Douglas Sladen
  - "Under the Wattle"
- Victor Daley
  - "Players"
  - "Anna"
  - "The Night Ride"
- Alice Werner
  - "Bannerman of Dandenong: An Australian Ballad"
- Ethel Castilla
  - "The Australian Girl"
  - "A Song of Sydney"
- Francis Adams
  - "Something"
  - "Gordon's Grave"
  - "To A. L. Gordon"
  - "Love and Death"
- Thomas William Heney
  - "Absence"
  - "A Riverina Road"
- Patrick Edward Quinn
  - "A Girl's Grave"
- John Sandes
  - "'With Death's Prophetic Ear'"
- Inez K. Hyland
  - "To a Wave"
  - "Bread and Wine"
- George Essex Evans
  - "An Australian Symphony"
  - "A Nocturne"
  - "A Pastoral"
  - "The Women of the West"
- Mary Colborne-Veel
  - "`What Look hath She?'"
  - "Saturday Night"
  - "`Resurgam'"
  - "Distant Authors"
- John Bernard O'Hara
  - "Happy Creek"
  - "A Country Village"
  - "Flinders"
- M. A. Sinclair
  - "The Chatelaine"
- Sydney Jephcott
  - "Chaucer"
  - "White Paper"
  - "Splitting"
  - "Home-woe"
  - "A Ballad of the last King of Thule"
  - "A Fragment"
- A. B. Paterson
  - "The Daylight is Dying"
  - "Clancy of the Overflow"
  - "Black Swans"
  - "The Travelling Post Office"
  - "The Old Australian Ways"
  - "By the Grey Gulf-Water"
- Jessie Mackay
  - "The Grey Company"
  - "A Folk Song"
  - "Dunedin in the Gloaming"
  - "The Burial of Sir John Mackenzie"
- Henry Lawson
  - "Andy's Gone with Cattle"
  - "Out Back"
  - "The Star of Australasia"
  - "Middleton's Rouseabout"
  - "The Vagabond"
  - "The Sliprails and the Spur"
- Arthur Albert Dawson Bayldon
  - "Sunset"
  - "The Sea"
  - "To Poesy"
- Jennings Carmichael
  - "An Old Bush Road"
  - "A Woman's Mood"
- Agnes L. Storrie
  - "Twenty Gallons of Sleep"
  - "A Confession"
- Martha M. Simpson
  - "To an Old Grammar"
- William Gay
  - "Primroses"
  - "To M."
  - "Vestigia Nulla Retrorsum"
- Edward Dyson
  - "The Old Whim Horse"
- Dowell O'Reilly
  - "The Sea-Maiden"
- David MacDonald Ross
  - "Love's Treasure House"
  - "The Sea to the Shell"
  - "The Silent Tide"
  - "The Watch on Deck"
  - "Autumn"
- Mary Gilmore
  - "A Little Ghost"
  - "Good-Night"
- Bernard O'Dowd
  - "Love's Substitute"
  - "Our Duty"
- Edwin James Brady
  - "The Wardens of the Seas"
- Will H. Ogilvie
  - "Queensland Opal"
  - "Wind o' the Autumn"
  - "Daffodils"
  - "A Queen of Yore"
  - "Drought"
  - "The Shadow on the Blind"
- Roderic Quinn
  - "The House of the Commonwealth"
  - "The Lotus-Flower"
- David McKee Wright
  - "An Old Colonist's Reverie"
- Christopher John Brennan
  - "Romance 'XXI Poems: Towards the Source'"
  - "Poppies"
- John Le Gay Brereton
  - "The Sea Maid"
  - "Home"
  - "Wilfred"
- Arthur H. Adams
  - "Bayswater, W."
  - "Bond Street"
- Ethel Turner
  - "A Trembling Star"
  - "'Oh, if that Rainbow up there!'"
- Johannes Carl Andersen
  - "Soft, Low and Sweet"
  - "Maui Victor"
- Dora Wilcox
  - "In London"
- Ernest Currie
  - "Laudabunt Alii"
- George Charles Whitney
  - "Sunset"
- James Lister Cuthbertson (reprise)
  - "Ode to Apollo"

== See also ==
- 1906 in Australian literature
- 1906 in poetry
