= Portrait: The Very Best of John Schumann =

Greatest hits album by John Schumann
- Released: 2003
- Genre: Folk
- Label: Columbia

John Schumann chronology
True Believers (1993)	Portrait: The Very Best of John Schumann (2003)	Lawson (2005)

Portrait: The Very Best of John Schumann is a "best of" album by John Schumann, previously the frontman of Redgum. It includes songs from his previous two solo albums, Etched in Blue and True Believers, I was only 19 from his Redgum days, and a previously unreleased track, "One True Game", about Australian rules football.

== Album artwork ==
The cover art shows a painting of Schumann by Sue Flanagan, which was entered in the Archibald portrait competition in 2002.

== Track listing ==
1. "I Was Only Nineteen"
2. "Borrowed Ground"
3. "Holy Mary"
4. "Thunder Across The Reef"
5. "Safe Behind The Wire"
6. "For The Children"
7. "If I Close My Eyes"
8. "Leigh Creek Road"
9. "Clancy of the Overflow"
10. "Eyes on Fire"
11. "Roll on the Day"
12. "If the War Goes On"
13. "One True Game"
