= 1895 in Australian literature =

This article presents a list of the historical events and publications of Australian literature during 1895.

== Books ==
- Guy Boothby
  - A Bid for Fortune; Or, Doctor Nikola's Vendetta
  - A Lost Endeavour
  - The Marriage of Esther: A Torres Strait Sketch
- Ada Cambridge – Fidelis: A Novel
- Henry Kingsley – Reginald Hetherage and Leighton Court
- Rosa Praed – Mrs Tregaskiss: A Novel of Anglo-Australian Life
- Ethel Turner
  - The Family at Misrule
  - The Story of a Baby

== Short stories ==
- Edward Dyson
  - "After the Accident"
  - "Dead Man's Lode"
  - "The Trucker's Dream"
  - "A Visit to Scrubby Gully"
- Ernest Favenc – "The Boundary Rider's Story"
- Mary Fortune – "The Major's Case"
- Henry Lawson – "Steelman's Pupil"
- A. B. Paterson – "Concerning a Dog Fight"
- Steele Rudd
  - "Our First Harvest"
  - "Starting the Selection"
  - "When the Wolf Was at the Door"

== Poetry ==
- Jennings Carmichael – Poems
- Daniel Henry Deniehy – "A Song for the Night"
- Edward Dyson
  - "Bullocky Bill and His Old Red Team"
  - "When Brother Peetree Prayed: A Recollection"
- Henry Lawson – "The Vagabond"
- Louise Mack – "Of a Wild White Bird"
- John Shaw Neilson – "Marian's Child"
- Will H. Ogilvie
  - "From the Gulf"
  - "Northward to the Sheds"
- A. B. Paterson
  - "Brumby's Run"
  - The Man from Snowy River and Other Verses
  - "Waltzing Matilda"

== Births ==
A list, ordered by date of birth (and, if the date is either unspecified or repeated, ordered alphabetically by surname) of births in 1895 of Australian literary figures, authors of written works or literature-related individuals follows, including year of death.

- 7 April – E. V. Timms, novelist (died 1960)
- 11 August — Victor Kennedy, poet (died 1952)
- 28 September — Edward Harrington, poet (died 1966)
- 15 November – Leonard Mann, poet and novelist (died 1981)
- 10 December — Campbell Dixon, journalist, publicist and playwright (died 1960 in London)

== Deaths ==
A list, ordered by date of death (and, if the date is either unspecified or repeated, ordered alphabetically by surname) of deaths in 1895 of Australian literary figures, authors of written works or literature-related individuals follows, including year of birth.

- 21 October – Louisa Anne Meredith, poet (born 1812)

== See also ==
- 1895 in Australia
- 1895 in literature
- 1895 in poetry
- List of years in Australian literature
- List of years in literature
