= 1866 in Australian literature =

This article presents a list of the historical events and publications of Australian literature during 1866.

== Books ==
- Benjamin Farjeon – Grif : A Story of Colonial Life
- Mary Fortune
  - Bertha's Legacy
  - Clyzia the Dwarf : A Romance
  - The Secrets of Balbrooke : A Tale
- Maud Jeanne Franc – Minnie's Mission : An Australian Temperance Tale
- Eliza Winstanley – Desmoro : or, The Red Hand

== Short stories ==
- Rolf Boldrewood – "A Kangaroo Drive"
- Marcus Clarke – "The Dual Existence" (aka "The Doppelganger")
- Mary Fortune – "Kirsty Oglevie"

== Poetry ==
- Ada Cambridge – Hymns on the Holy Communion
- Adam Lindsay Gordon
  - "The Old Leaven"
  - "Visions in the Smoke"
- Henry Kendall
  - "Campaspe"
  - "Sitting by the Fire" (aka "Song")
  - "The Voyage of Telegonus"
- Menie Parkes – Poems

== Births ==
A list, ordered by date of birth (and, if the date is either unspecified or repeated, ordered alphabetically by surname) of births in 1866 of Australian literary figures, authors of written works or literature-related individuals follows, including year of death.

- 26 March – Barcroft Boake, poet (died 1892)
- 11 April – Bernard O'Dowd, poet (died 1953)
- 21 July – Charles Wiltens Andree Hayward, English-born poet and short story writer (died 1950)

== See also ==
- 1866 in Australia
- 1866 in literature
- 1866 in poetry
- List of years in Australian literature
- List of years in literature
