= Banjo, of the Overflow =

1892 poem by Francis Kenna

- by Francis Kenna
- First published in: The Bulletin
- Country: Australia
- Language: English
- Publication date: 27 August 1892

Full text
- Banjo, of the Overflow at Wikisource

Banjo, of the Overflow is a poem by Australian poet Francis Kenna. It was first published in The Bulletin magazine on 27 August 1892 in reply to fellow poets Henry Lawson, Banjo Paterson and Edward Dyson. This poem formed part of the Bulletin Debate, a series of works by Lawson, Paterson, and others, about the true nature of life in the Australian bush.

In Up The Country, Lawson had criticised "City Bushmen" such as Banjo Paterson who tended to romanticise bush life. Paterson, in turn, accused Lawson of representing bush life as nothing but doom and gloom. Kenna's poem is a parody of Paterson's popular work, Clancy of the Overflow, playfully pointing out the irony of a city-dweller writing poems about life in the country. The author of the poem was initially credited only as "K."

== Further publication ==
After the poem's initial publication in The Bulletin it was reprinted in The Penguin Book of Australian Ballads edited by Elizabeth Webby and Philip Butterss (1993).

== See also ==
- 1892 in poetry
- 1892 in literature
- Australian literature
