= A Convict's Tour of Hell =

1830s poem by Francis MacNamara

"A Convict's Tour to Hell"
- by Francis MacNamara
- Written: ca. 1832-1839
- Country: Australia
- Language: English
- Publisher: The Cumberland Times
- Publication date: 27 December 1900
- Lines: 228

Full text
- A Convict's Tour of Hell at Wikisource

"A Convict's Tour to Hell" is a poem by Australian author Francis MacNamara, also known as "Frank the Poet", written some time in the 1830s.

It is believed to have been written in 1839 when the author was working at Establishment Station in Stroud, New South Wales, although a manuscript of the poem, held in the Mitchell Library in Sydney, indicates a composition date of 23 October 1832, at the same location.

The poem's first known publication was in The Cumberland Times, 27 December 1900, under the title "A Tour to Hell". This publication was accompanied by a note indicating that the poem had not been published anywhere previously. The first book publication of the poem later in 1900, along with a poem by Henry Kendall, was a copy of this version.

== Synopsis ==
"'A Convict's Tour to Hell' chronicles Frank's tour of the underworld, where he discovers the notorious penal administrators such as Captain Logan and Governor Darling are suffering the kind of hellish punishment that they inflicted on the convicts."

== Critical reception ==
The Oxford Companion to Australian Literature states that the poem is "modelled on the satires of Jonathan Swift".

== Publication history ==
The poem has appeared under the alternate titles of "A Tour to Hell" and "A Convict's Tour of Hell".

After the poem's initial publication in The Cumberland Times in 1900 it was reprinted as follows:

- Frank the Poet : The Life and Works of Francis MacNamara edited by John Meredith and Rex Whalan, Red Rooster Press, 1979
- The New Oxford Book of Australian Verse edited by Les Murray, Oxford University Press, 1986
- The Penguin Book of Australian Satirical Verse edited by Philip Neilson, Penguin, 1986
- The Irish-Australian Connection (An Caidream Gael-Astralach) edited by Seamus Grimes and Gearoid O Tuathaigh, University College Galway, 1988
- Exiles from Erin : Convict Lives in Ireland and Australia edited by Bob Reece, Macmillan, 1991
- The Penguin Book of Australian Ballads edited by Elizabeth Webby and Philip Butterss, Penguin, 1993
- The Sting in the Wattle : Australian Satirical Verse edited by Philip Neilsen, University of Queensland Press, 1993
- A Working Forest : Selected Prose by Les Murray, Duffy and Snellgrove, 1997
- Australian Verse : An Oxford Anthology edited by John Leonard, Oxford University Press, 1998
- The Turning Wave : Poems and Songs of Irish Australia edited by Colleen Burke and Vincent Woods, Kardoorair Press, 2001
- Hell and After : Four Early English-language Poets of Australia edited by Les Murray, Carcanet, 2005
- An Anthology of Australian Poetry to 1920 edited by John Kinsella, University of Western Australia Library, 2007
- 100 Australian Poems You Need to Know edited by Jamie Grant, Hardie Grant, 2008
- Macquarie PEN Anthology of Australian Literature edited by Nicholas Jose, Kerryn Goldsworthy, Anita Heiss, David McCooey, Peter Minter, Nicole Moore, and Elizabeth Webby, Allen and Unwin, 2009

== Notes ==
- Australian cultural historian Warren Fahey used the poem as the basis for an episode of his Sydney Stories historical video series
