= 1888 in Australian literature =

This article presents a list of the historical events and publications of Australian literature during 1888.

== Events ==
- Angus & Robertson publish their first book, A Crown of Wattle, a collection of poetry by H. Peden Steel (unknown date)

== Books ==
- Rolf Boldrewood — A Sydney-Side Saxon
- Ada Cambridge — A Woman's Friendship
- Fergus Hume — Madame Midas : A Realistic and Sensational Story of Australian Mining Life
- Hume Nisbet — The Land of the Hibiscus Blossom : A Yarn of the Papuan Gulf
- Rosa Praed
  - The Ladies' Gallery : A Novel with Justin McCarthy
  - The Rebel Rose : A Novel with Justin McCarthy
  - The Soul of Countess Adrian : A Romance

== Poetry ==
- Francis Adams — Songs of the Army of the Night
- Victor Daley — "A Sunset Fantasy"
- George Essex Evans — "Alone"
- Henry Lawson
  - "Andy's Gone with Cattle"
  - "Andy's Return"
  - "The Blue Mountains"
  - "Faces in the Street"
- Louisa Lawson — "To a Bird"
- A. B. Paterson
  - "Old Pardon, the Son of Reprieve : A Racing Rhyme"
  - "Uncle Bill : The Larrikin's Lament"
- Douglas Sladen
  - A Century of Australian Song (edited)
  - "Under the Wattle"
- James Brunton Stephens — "The Gentle Anarchist"
- William Charles Wentworth — "Sydney in 1822"

== Short stories ==
- Edward Dyson — "Mr and Mrs Sin Fat"
- Henry Lawson — "His Father's Mate"

== Drama ==
- John Perry — The Life and Death of Captain Cook

== Non-fiction ==
- Ernest Favenc — The History of Australian Exploration from 1788 to 1888

== Births ==
A list, ordered by date of birth (and, if the date is either unspecified or repeated, ordered alphabetically by surname) of births in 1888 of Australian literary figures, authors of written works or literature-related individuals follows, including year of death.

- 18 March — Pat Hanna, dramatist (died 1973)

Unknown date

- Grace Ethel Martyr, poet (d. 1934)

== See also ==
- 1888 in Australia
- 1888 in literature
- 1888 in poetry
- List of years in Australian literature
- List of years in literature
