= Wallis and Matilda =

Australian folk music group

- Origin: Australia
- Genres: Pop rock
- Years active: 1980–present
- Labels: Festival Records

Wallis and Matilda are an Australian group that interpret the works of Australian bush poet, Banjo Paterson.

== Discography ==
=== Studio albums ===
List of studio albums, with Australian positions
Title	Details	Peak chart positions
Title	Details	AUS
Pioneers A Musical Tribute to A. B. (Banjo) Paterson	Released: 1980; Label: Festival Records (L-37481)	17
The Old Australian Ways A Musical Tribute to A.B. (Banjo) Paterson Vol. 2	Released: 1981; Label: Festival Records (L-37671)	83
A Singer Of The Bush A Musical Tribute to A.B. (Banjo) Paterson Vol. 3	Released: 1984; Label: Festival Records (L-38283)	-
Australian Gold A Commemorative Tribute to A.B (Banjo) Paterson	Released: 1987; Label: Festival Records (CD-38807)	-
Song of the Federation A Musical Tribute to A.B. (Banjo) Paterson Vol. 4	Released: December 2003; Label: Access Music (WM0004)	-
Over the Range A Musical Tribute to A.B. (Banjo) Paterson Vol. 5	Released: 2008; Label: Access Music	-
Song of the Pen A Musical Tribute to A.B. (Banjo) Paterson Vol. 5	Released: 2008; Label: Access Music	-
Banjo the Bard of the Bush 30th Anniversary Musical Tribute to A.B. (Banjo) Paterson	Released: 2013; Label: Access Music	-

=== Compilation albums ===
Title	Details
The Great A.B. 'Banjo' Paterson Collection	Released: 2002; Label: Rajon Music Group (R0074); Note: 3xCD Collection of Tributes 1,2 & 3.

=== Charting singles ===
Year	Title	Peak chart positions	Album
Year	Title	AUS	Album
1980	"Clancy of the Overflow"	30	Pioneers - A Tribute to A. B. (Banjo) Paterson
