= The Overflow of Clancy =

1892 poem by Henry Lawson

- by "H.H.C.C"
- Written: 1892
- First published in: The Bulletin
- Country: Australia
- Language: English
- Publication date: 20 August 1892

Full text
- The Overflow of Clancy at Wikisource

The Overflow of Clancy is a poem written under the pseudonym "H.H.C.C" and first published in The Bulletin magazine on 20 August 1892 as part of the Bulletin Debate, a series of poems about the true nature of life in the Australian bush. The poem is a parody of Paterson's Clancy of the Overflow.

Colin Roderick, in his biography Banjo Paterson: Poet by Accident (1993), states on page 76 that he believes the poem was written by Henry Lawson.

However, Herbert Humphrey Cripps-Clark (1860–1929) was a contemporary poet whose initials were the same as those of the pseudonym.

== External sources ==
- Original Bulletin magazine text

== See also ==
- 1892 in poetry
- 1892 in literature
- Australian literature
