= The Vagabond (poem) =

1895 poem by Australian writer Henry Lawson

- by Henry Lawson
- First published in: The Bulletin
- Country: Australia
- Language: English
- Publication date: 31 August 1895
- Lines: 108

Full text
- The Vagabond (Lawson) at Wikisource

"The Vagabond" (1895) is a poem by Australian poet Henry Lawson.

It was originally published in The Bulletin on 31 August 1895 and subsequently reprinted in several of the author's collections, other periodicals and a number of Australian poetry anthologies.

== Critical reception ==
While reviewing the author's collection In the Days When the World was Wide and Other Verses, a reviewer in The Daily Telegraph (Sydney) commented "While there is an absence of the humor so marked a feature in Mr. Lawson's admirable prose sketches, there are equal minuteness and accuracy of delineation. The writer is at his best in 'The Vagabond'".

== Publication history ==
After the poem's initial publication in The Bulletin it was reprinted as follows:

- In the Days When the World was Wide and Other Verses by Henry Lawson, Angus and Robertson, 1900
- An Anthology of Australian Verse edited by Bertram Stevens, Angus and Robertson, 1907
- The Golden Treasury of Australian Verse edited by Bertram Stevens, Angus and Robertson, 1909
- Selected Poems of Henry Lawson by Henry Lawson, Angus and Robertson, 1918
- The World of Henry Lawson edited by Walter Stone, Hamlyn, 1974
- A Treasury of Colonial Poetry, Currawong, 1982
- A Campfire Yarn : Henry Lawson Complete Works 1885-1900 edited by Leonard Cronin, Lansdowne, 1984

== See also ==
- 1895 in Australian literature
- 1895 in poetry
