= True Believers (John Schumann album) =

Studio album by John Schumann
- Released: October 1993
- Recorded: September 1992
- Studio: Hargrave St, East Sydney
- Genre: Folk
- Label: Columbia
- Producer: Mal Logan, John Schumann

John Schumann chronology
John Schumann Goes Looby-Loo: A Collection of Songs for Little Kids (1988)	True Believers (1993)	Portrait: The Very Best of John Schumann (2003)

True Believers is the third solo album by John Schumann, previously the frontman of Redgum. Released in October 1993, it was reissued in 2009.

== Album artwork ==
The cover art shows a black and white photomosaic of various famous and influential Australians from the time the album was released, with Schumann in the middle, the only face in color.

== Track listing ==
1. "If I Close My Eyes"
2. "Leigh Creek Road"
3. "Fallen Angel"
4. "Eyes on Fire"
5. "Working Class Man"
6. "Roll On The Day"
7. "Clancy of the Overflow"
8. "If The War Goes On"
9. "Hyde Park Calling (King William Road, Scene 1)"
10. "Plympton High"
11. "Eyes on Fire" (acoustic)
12. "If I Close My Eyes" (reprise)
