= Faces in the Street =

Poem by Australian writer Henry Lawson

- by Henry Lawson
- Written: 1888
- First published in: The Bulletin
- Country: Australia
- Language: English
- Preceded by: "Andy's Return"
- Followed by: "The Blue Mountains"

Full text
- Faces in the Street at Wikisource

"Faces in the Street" (1888) is a poem by Australian poet Henry Lawson.

It was originally published in The Bulletin on 28 July 1888. It was subsequently reprinted in several of the author's other collections, other newspapers and periodicals and a number of Australian poetry anthologies.

== Critical reception ==
A writer in The Oxford Companion to Australian Literature comments: "Written in a stirring rhythm from the perspective of a person whose 'window-sill is level with the faces in the street', the poem focuses on the flotsam and jetsam of the city who pass by from before dawn until after midnight."

In reviewing the author's collection In the Days When the World was Wide and Other Verses a writer in The Daily Telegraph (Sydney) noted: "'Faces In the Street,' 'For'ard,' and 'The Cambaroora Star' touch questions of social reform. Or perhaps it would be better to say that they show the author's sympathy therewith, since he merely rails against the visible wrongs that now exist without seeming to have a constructive policy."

== Publication history ==
After the poem's initial publication in The Bulletin it was reprinted as follows:

- In the Days When the World was Wide and Other Verses by Henry Lawson, Angus and Robertson, 1900
- Selected Poems of Henry Lawson by Henry Lawson, Angus and Robertson, 1918
- Freedom on the Wallaby : Poems of the Australian People edited by Marjorie Pizer, Pinchgut Press, 1953
- Favourite Australian Poems edited by Ian Mudie, Rigby, 1963
- Poems of Henry Lawson edited by Walter Stone, Ure Smith, 1973
- The World of Henry Lawson edited by Walter Stone, Hamlyn, 1974
- The Bulletin, 29 January 1980
- The Collins Book of Australian Poetry edited by Rodney Hall, Collins, 1981
- The Essential Henry Lawson : The Best Works of Australia's Greatest Writer edited Brian Kiernan, Currey O'Neil, 1982
- A Campfire Yarn : Henry Lawson Complete Works 1885-1900 edited by Leonard Cronin, Lansdowne, 1984
- The Illustrated Treasury of Australian Verse edited by Beatrice Davis, Nelson, 1984
- My Country : Australian Poetry and Short Stories, Two Hundred Years edited by Leonie Kramer, Lansdowne, 1985
- The Penguin Book of Australian Ballads edited by Elizabeth Webby and Philip Butterss, Penguin, 1993
- The Illustrated Treasury of Australian Verse edited by Beatrice Davis, State Library of NSW Press, 1996
- 200 Years of Australian Writing : An Anthology edited by James F. H. Moore, VDL Publications, 1997
- Harbour City Poems : Sydney in Verse 1788-2008 edited by Martin Langford, Puncher and Wattman, 2009

== See also ==
- 1888 in Australian literature
- 1888 in poetry
