= Out Back (poem) =

1893 poem by Australian writer Henry Lawson

- by Henry Lawson
- First published in: The Bulletin
- Country: Australia
- Language: English
- Publication date: 30 September 1893
- Lines: 40

Full text
- Out Back at Wikisource

"Out Back" (1893) is a poem by Australian poet Henry Lawson.

It was originally published in The Bulletin on 30 September 1893 and subsequently reprinted in several of the author's collections, other periodicals and a number of Australian poetry anthologies.

== Critical reception ==
In a review of In the Days When the World was Wide and Other Verses in The Sydney Morning Herald a reviewer referred to the poem's "pitiless realism".

Reviewing the same volume in The South Australian Register a reviewer called the poem a "powerful piece of realism".

== Publication history ==
After the poem's initial publication in The Bulletin it was reprinted as follows:

- The Worker, 15 December 1894
- In the Days When the World was Wide and Other Verses by Henry Lawson, Angus and Robertson, 1900
- The Queenslander, 14 December 1901
- An Anthology of Australian Verse edited by Bertram Stevens, Angus and Robertson, 1907
- The Golden Treasury of Australian Verse edited by Bertram Stevens, Angus and Robertson, 1909
- Selected Poems of Henry Lawson by Henry Lawson, Angus and Robertson, 1918
- Winnowed Verse by Henry Lawson, Angus and Robertson, 1924
- Selections from Australian Poets edited by Bertram Stephens and George Mackaness, Cornstalk Publishing, 1925
- New Song in an Old Land edited by Rex Ingamells, 1943
- Out Back and Other Poems by Henry Lawson, W. H. Honey, 1943
- Poets of Australia : An Anthology of Australian Verse edited by George Mackaness, Angus & Robertson, 1946
- A Treasury of Colonial Poetry, Currawong, 1982
- A Campfire Yarn : Henry Lawson Complete Works 1885-1900 edited by Leonard Cronin, Lansdowne, 1984
- A Collection of Australian Bush Verse, Peter Antill-Rose, 1989
- An Australian Treasury of Popular Verse edited by Jim Haynes, ABC Books, 2002

== See also ==
- 1893 in Australian literature
- 1893 in poetry
