= The Sliprails and the Spur =

Poem by Australian writer Henry Lawson

- by Henry Lawson
- Written: 1899
- First published in: The Bulletin
- Country: Australia
- Language: English

Full text
- The Sliprails and the Spur at Wikisource

"The Sliprails and the Spur" (1899) is a poem by Australian poet Henry Lawson.

It was originally published in The Bulletin on 1 April 1899 and subsequently reprinted in several of the author's other collections, other periodicals and a number of Australian poetry anthologies.

== Critical reception ==
While reviewing The Golden Treasury of Australian Verse edited by Bertram Stevens a writer in The Western Mail noted that this poem, among others in the anthology, represents "Australian bush life in a way to delight those who know it by experience, and are a means of interpretation to the city man".

In an essay outlining Lawson's career and work, the reviewer "Wayfarer" called this poem a "nugget of pure Australian gold", and asked "Is there in Australian literature a more poignantly beautiful piece than this?"

== Publication history ==
After the poem's initial publication in The Bulletin it was reprinted as follows:

- In the Days When the World was Wide and Other Verses by Henry Lawson, Angus and Robertson, 1900
- An Anthology of Australian Verse edited by Bertram Stevens, Angus and Robertson, 1907
- The Golden Treasury of Australian Verse edited by Bertram Stevens, Angus and Robertson, 1909
- Selected Poems of Henry Lawson by Henry Lawson, Angus and Robertson, 1918
- The Oxford Book of Australasian Verse edited by Walter Murdoch, Oxford University Press, 1924
- Winnowed Verse by Henry Lawson, Angus and Robertson, 1924
- Selections from Australian Poets edited by Bertram Stephens and George Mackaness, Cornstalk Publishing, 1925
- The Australian Women's Mirror, 5 January 1926, p37
- An Australasian Anthology : Australian and New Zealand Poems edited by Percival Serle, R. H. Croll, and Frank Wilmot, Collins, 1927
- New Song in an Old Land edited by Rex Ingamells, 1943
- Out Back and Other Poems by Henry Lawson, W. H. Honey, 1943
- From the Ballads to Brennan edited by T. Inglis Moore, Angus & Robertson, 1964
- Poems of Henry Lawson edited by Walter Stone, Ure Smith, 1973
- The World of Henry Lawson edited by Walter Stone, Hamlyn, 1974
- The Essential Henry Lawson : The Best Works of Australia's Greatest Writer edited Brian Kiernan, Currey O'Neil, 1982
- A Treasury of Colonial Poetry, Currawong, 1982
- A Campfire Yarn : Henry Lawson Complete Works 1885-1900 edited by Leonard Cronin, Lansdowne, 1984
- Cross-Country : A Book of Australian Verse edited by John Barnes and Brian MacFarlane, Heinemann, 1984
- The Penguin Book of Australian Ballads edited by Elizabeth Webby and Philip Butterss, Penguin, 1993
- The Oxford Book of Australian Love Poems edited by Jennifer Strauss, Oxford University Press, 1993
- Australian Verse : An Oxford Anthology edited by John Leonard, Oxford University Press, 1998
- The Puncher & Wattmann Anthology of Australian Poetry edited by John Leonard, Puncher & Wattmann, 2009
- Australian Poetry Since 1788 edited by Geoffrey Lehmann and Robert Gray, University of NSW Press, 2011

== See also ==
- 1899 in Australian literature
- 1899 in poetry
