= The Star of Australasia =

1897 poem by Australian writer Henry Lawson

- by Henry Lawson
- First published in: The Australian Workman
- Country: Australia
- Language: English
- Publication date: 6 March 1897
- Lines: 80

Full text
- The Star of Australasia at Wikisource

"The Star of Australasia" (1987) is a poem by Australian poet Henry Lawson. The poem is also known by the titles "War: A Prophecy Fulfilled" and "The Star of Australia".

It was originally published in The Australian Workman on 6 March 1897 and subsequently reprinted in several of the author's collections, other periodicals and a number of Australian poetry anthologies.

== Critical reception ==
Writing about Lawson's "Battle Songs" for The Cairns Post in 1940, a critic noted that "Lawson saw the things that we suffered in the last war [World War I], that we will endure in this war [World War II], as far back as 1895 in 'Star of Australasia', one of his longest and most passionate utterances of belief in the future of Australia."

In his volume A History of Australian Literature, H. M. Green called the poem "a rousing appeal to all who hope for the future", and one where "Lawson looked forward to the brightening and unifying effect of a great defensive war fought for a high ideal."

== Publication history ==
After the poem's initial publication in The Australian Workman it was reprinted as follows:

- In the Days When the World was Wide and Other Verses by Henry Lawson, Angus and Robertson, 1900
- An Anthology of Australian Verse edited by Bertram Stevens, Angus and Robertson, 1907
- The Freeman's Journal, 23 April 1908
- The Golden Treasury of Australian Verse edited by Bertram Stevens, Angus and Robertson, 1909
- The Queenslander, 1 December 1917
- Selected Poems of Henry Lawson by Henry Lawson, Angus and Robertson, 1918
- Out Back and Other Poems by Henry Lawson, W. H. Honey, 1943
- The World of Henry Lawson edited by Walter Stone, Hamlyn, 1974
- The Essential Henry Lawson : The Best Works of Australia's Greatest Writer edited Brian Kiernan, Currey O'Neil, 1982
- A Treasury of Colonial Poetry, Currawong, 1982
- A Campfire Yarn : Henry Lawson Complete Works 1885-1900 edited by Leonard Cronin, Lansdowne, 1984

== See also ==
- 1897 in Australian literature
- 1897 in poetry
