= Poems (Carmichael collection) =

Poetry collection by Jennings Carmichael

- Author: Jennings Carmichael
- Language: English
- Publisher: Longmans, Green, and Co London, and Melville, Mullen and Slade Melbourne
- Publication date: 1895
- Publication place: Australia
- Media type: Print (Hardback)
- Pages: 212

Poems (1895) is a collection of poems by Australian poet Jennings Carmichael. It was published in hardback by Longmans, Green, and Co in London, and Melville, Mullen and Slade in Melbourne in 1895.

The anthology includes 90 poems by the author.

== Contents ==
- "The Dead Laureate"
- "When Lightwood Flowers"
- "At Ebb-tide"
- "The Dance of the Shadows"
- "A Wallaby Christmas-Tide"
- "To a Laughing Jackass"
- "A Poem 'bout Me"
- "Noon at Tynong, Victoria"
- "Only Ted"
- "Unspoken"
- "Wattle-Gold"
- "A Story at Sunset"
- "To A.C.C."
- "Evening, On the Plains"
- "Getting at Jim"
- "English Trees"
- "The Birds' Home-Coming"
- "One, Two, Three"
- "A Lost Baby"
- "Eventide"
- "Ours to Keep"
- "The Shadow of the Cross"
- "Alder-Lievist : A Song"
- "Nine Years Old"
- "In Glenmarie Orchard, Doncaster"
- "God Knoweth Best"
- "In the Furrows : To F.M.S."
- "Evening-Time"
- "To J. J. M. (On His Wedding Day)"
- "When God Says No"
- "Peace, Perfect Peace"
- "Shadow and Shine"
- "Little Jim : At the Children's Hospital"
- "To an Urchin"
- "The Wooden Legs"
- "A Nursery Lullaby"
- "At the Last"
- "Renunciation"
- "A Bush Noontide, and Thoughts"
- "A Bird's Nest"
- "A Christmas Morning Soliloquy"
- "To a Spray of Gippsland Wattle-Blossom"
- "Late Laurels (At the grave of A. L. Gordon, Poet)"
- "A Bush Gloaming"
- "A City Sparrow"
- "Tomboy Madge"
- "In the Nursery"
- "To the Little Ones"
- "A Wreath from Adam's Garden"
- "Laughing Jackasses"
- "From the Pomegranates"
- "The Southward Breeze"
- "An Autumn Mood"
- "To Ivy"
- "A Wooden Doll"
- "Baby"
- "An Old Bush Road"
- "Will You Remember?"
- "A Remonstrance"
- "To the Chime of Bells (Christmas, 1887)"
- "Granny"
- "For Someone's Sake"
- "In the Cool of the Day"
- "A Woman's Mood"
- "Beautiful Life"
- "Let There Be No To-Morrow"
- "The Theme Supreme"
- "Autumn"
- "The Neglected Garden"
- "Old Manuscripts"
- "The Prodigal"
- "Wattle-Time"
- "Sunset in the City"
- "In the Twilight"
- "To C.F.R."
- "Passion and Poppies"
- "A Minor Key"
- "In the Moonlight"
- "The Cross"
- "Sweet Summer's Dead"
- "Just as Well"
- "Good-Bye, My Friend"
- "The Years Ago"
- "Faded Flowers"
- "Not Such a While Ago"
- "In Vain"
- "Were It Light Instead of Darkness"
- "Elm Trees in Autumn"
- "In Memory (C. S. C.)"
- "A Good-Night"

== Critical reception ==
A reviewer in The Australasian newspaper stated: "She never probes deeply; her verses reveal no spirit wrestling with inscrutable problems, those dark mysteries of time and eternity that underlie the passing of busy days and restful nights. Her work is sweet and true in its own round, a narrow round no doubt, but in it lie the subjects that the average reader of poetry finds most readily suggestive of emotion...But while it is true that Miss Carmichael is not too deep, nor too passionate, nor to remote from human sympathies to be readily and without an effort understood, she yet has gifts of her own without which her popularity would be impossible."

In The Herald the reviewer noted: "This is a book of poetry upon which we heartily congratulate the gentle Australian authoress, of whom Melbourne is pardonably proud. Essentially is Miss Carmlchael the poetess of the children. Rarely indeed are their pretty ways so tenderly and truly pictured, or their winsome prattle put into verse so charming as we find in this volume."

== Publication history ==
After the original publication of the book in 1895, it was reprinted in 1910 by Lothian Books in Melbourne.

== See also ==
- 1895 in poetry
- 1895 in Australian literature
