= 1892 in poetry =

This article covers 1892 in poetry. Nationality words link to articles with information on the nation's poetry or literature (for instance, Irish or France).

== Events ==
- William Butler Yeats founds the National Literary Society in Dublin.

== Works published ==
=== Australia ===
Works of poetry involved in the "Bulletin Debate" series of poems in The Bulletin magazine about the true nature of life in the Australian bush
Publication Date	Author	Title
9 July 1892	Henry Lawson	Borderland (retitled Up The Country)
23 July 1892	Banjo Paterson	In Defence of the Bush
30 July 1892	Edward Dyson	The Fact of the Matter
6 August 1892	Henry Lawson	In Answer to "Banjo", and Otherwise (retitled: The City Bushman)
20 August 1892	H.H.C.C.	The Overflow of Clancy
27 August 1892	Francis Kenna	Banjo, of the Overflow
1 October 1892	Banjo Paterson	In Answer to Various Bards (retitled An Answer to Various Bards)
8 October 1892	Henry Lawson	The Poets of the Tomb
20 October 1894	Banjo Paterson	A Voice from the Town

=== United Kingdom ===
- A. C. Benson, Le Cahier Jaune
- Wilfred Scawen Blunt, Esther, Love Lyrics, and Natalia's
- Austin Dobson, The Ballad of Beau Brocade, and Other Poems of the XVIIIth Century
- Rudyard Kipling, Barrack-Room Ballads, and Other Verses, including "Gunga Din," "Danny Deever", "Fuzzy-Wuzzy", "Mandalay" and "Gentlemen-Rankers", first book publication, Methuen (second series published in 1896)
- Richard Le Gallienne, English Poems
- George Meredith:
  - Modern Love: A Reprint (originally published 1862)
  - Poems
- John Gambril Nicholson, Love in Earnest: Sonnets, Ballades, and Lyrics
- Arthur Symons, Silhouettes
- Alfred Tennyson (died October 6):
  - The Silent Voices
  - The Death of Oenone, Akbar's Dream, and Other Poems
- William Watson, Lachrymae Musarum, and Other Poems, about the death of Tennyson
- W. B. Yeats, The Countess Kathleen and Various Legends and Lyrics, including "The Lake Isle of Innisfree" (a poem first published in 1890) and the first version of the verse drama The Countess Cathleen, Irish poet published in the United Kingdom

=== United States ===
- Ambrose Bierce, Black Beetles in Amber, verse, nonfiction and drama
- James Whitcomb Riley, Green Fields and Running Brooks
- Walt Whitman (died March 26), Leaves of Grass, ninth edition

=== Other in English ===
- Frederick George Scott, Elton Hazlewood, Canada

== Works published in other languages ==
=== France ===
- Théodore de Banville, Dans la fournaise
- Paul Claudel, La Ville
- Francis Jammes, Vers, (also 1893 and 1894)
- Stéphane Mallarmé, Vers et prose
- Catulle Mendès, Les Poesies de Catulle Mendes, in three volumes
- François Villon (died 1460s?), first publication of Poems 7–11 of his "Ballades en jargon" in Oeuvres complëtes de François Villon, publiès díaprës les manuscrits et les plus anciennes Èditions, edited by Auguste Longnon, Paris: Lemerre, (Poems 1–6 were first published in 1489)

=== Other languages ===
- Stefan George, Algabal, illustrated by Melchior Lechter; limited, private edition; German
- Iwan Gilkin, Les ténèbres, frontispiece by Odilon Redon, French, published in Belgium
- Verner von Heidenstam, Hans Alienus, Swedish

== Births ==
Death years link to the corresponding "[year] in poetry" article:

- January 3 – J. R. R. Tolkien (died 1973), South African-born English fantasy novelist, poet, philologist and academic
- January 8 – Horiguchi Daigaku 堀口 大学 (died 1981), Japanese, Taishō and Shōwa period poet and translator of French literature; member of the Shinshisha ("The New Poetry Society"); accompanies his father on overseas diplomatic postings (surname: Horiguchi)
- January 30 – Caresse Crosby (died 1970), American poet, publisher, peace activist, socialite and patentee of a bra
- January 31 – Ozaki Kihachi 尾崎喜八 (died 1974), Japanese, Shōwa period poet (surname: Ozaki)
- February 8 – Ralph Chubb (died 1960), English poet, printer and artist
- February 22 – Edna St. Vincent Millay (died 1950), American poet and playwright
- March 8 – Juana de Ibarbourou (died 1979), Uruguayan poet
- March 9 – Vita Sackville-West (died 1962), English novelist, poet and gardener
- March 16 – César Vallejo (died 1938), Peruvian poet
- May 7 – Archibald MacLeish (died 1982), American poet, writer and the Librarian of Congress
- May 17 – Leon Gellert (died 1977), Australian poet
- May 26 – Maxwell Bodenheim (murdered 1954), American poet and novelist
- June 12 – Djuna Barnes (died 1982), American writer and poet
- July 8 – Richard Aldington (died 1962), English poet, novelist, writer, translator and biographer
- August 11 – Hugh MacDiarmid, pen name of Christopher Murray Grieve (died 1978), Scottish poet and nationalist
- October 8 (September 26 O.S.) – Marina Tsvetaeva (suicide 1941), Russian poet
- November 12 – Guo Moruo 郭沫若 (died 1978), Chinese archaeologist, historian, poet, politician and writer
- December 21 – Amy Clarke (died 1980), English mystical poet, writer and teacher

== Deaths ==
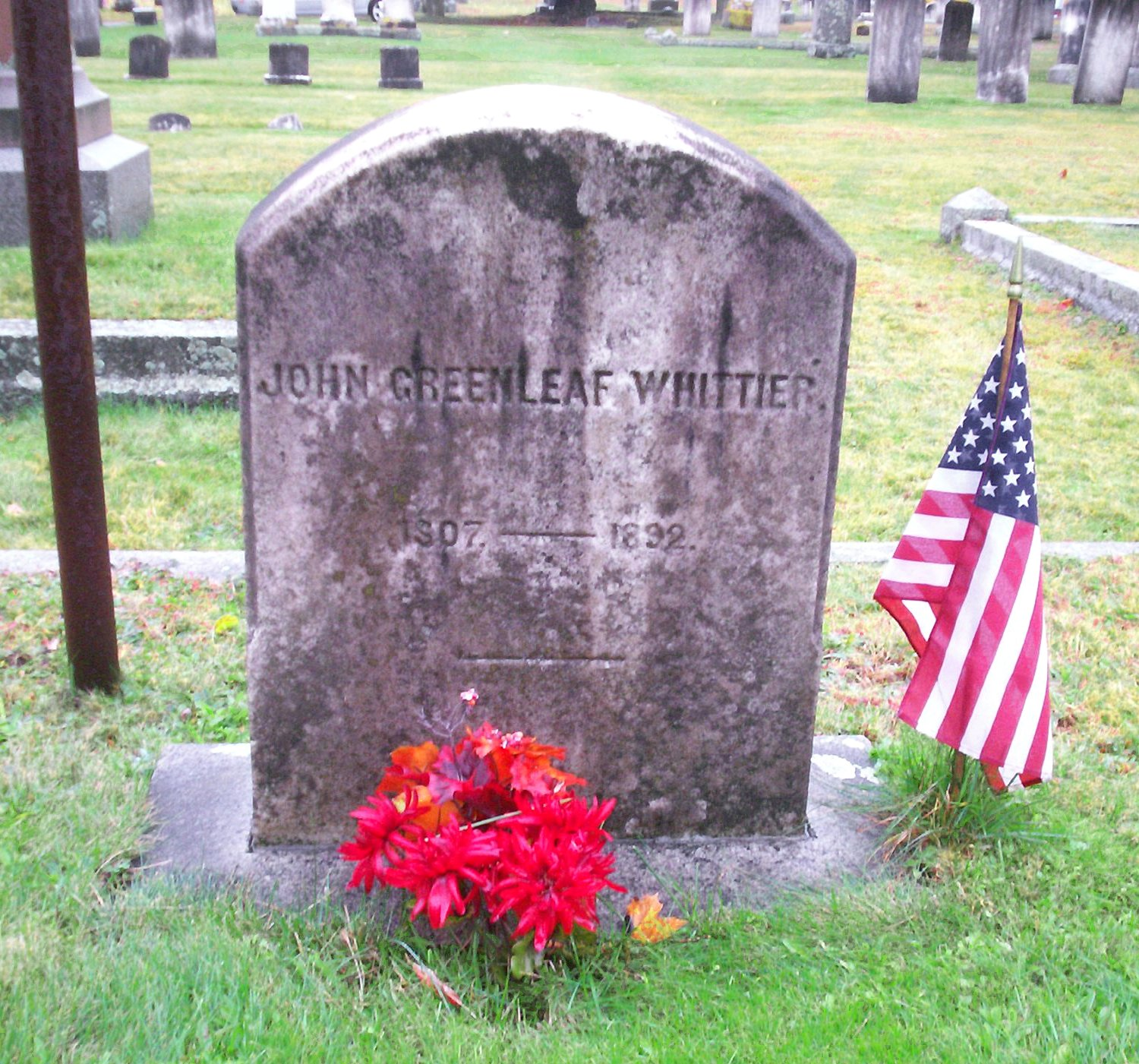
Grave of John Greenleaf Whittier in Amesbury, MA

Birth years link to the corresponding "[year] in poetry" article:

- March 26 – Walt Whitman (born 1819), American poet and journalist
- May 2 – Barcroft Boake (born 1866), Australian poet and boundary rider, probable suicide
- May 30/31 – Mary H. Gray Clarke (born 1835), American poet, author, correspondent
- July 15 – Thomas Cooper (born 1805), English Chartist, poet and religious lecturer
- September 7 – John Greenleaf Whittier (born 1807), American poet
- October 6 – Alfred, Lord Tennyson (born 1809), English Poet Laureate of the United Kingdom
- October 7 – Thomas Woolner (born 1825), English sculptor and poet
- December 1 – Carlo Favetti (born 1819), Friulian politician and poet
- December 3 (November 21 O.S.) – Afanasy Fet (born 1820), Russian lyric poet, essayist and short-story writer

== See also ==
- 19th century in poetry
- 19th century in literature
- List of years in poetry
- List of years in literature
- Victorian literature
- French literature of the 19th century
- Symbolist poetry
- Young Poland (Młoda Polska) a modernist period in Polish arts and literature, roughly from 1890 to 1918
- Poetry
