= In Defence of the Bush =

1892 poem by Banjo Paterson

- by Andrew Barton "Banjo" Paterson
- Written: 1892
- First published in: The Bulletin
- Country: Australia
- Language: English
- Series: Bulletin Debate
- Publication date: 23 July 1892

Full text
- In Defence of the Bush at Wikisource

In Defence of the Bush is a popular poem by Australian writer and poet Andrew Barton "Banjo" Paterson. It was first published in The Bulletin magazine on 23 July 1892 in reply to fellow poet Henry Lawson's poem, Up The Country. Paterson's rebuttal sparked the Bulletin Debate, a series of poems by both Lawson and Paterson about the true nature of life in the Australian bush.

In Up The Country, Lawson had criticised "The City Bushman" such as Banjo Paterson who tended to romanticise bush life. Paterson, in turn, accused Lawson of representing bush life as nothing but doom and gloom, famously ending with the line "For the bush will never suit you, and you'll never suit the bush."

== Publication history ==
After its original publication in The Bulletin magazine on 23 July 1892 the poem was later reprinted in the following collections and anthologies:

- The Man from Snowy River and Other Verses, 1895
- The Collected Verse of A. B. Paterson : Containing 'The Man from Snowy River', 'Rio Grande' and 'Saltbush Bill, M.P.' , 1921
- Singer of the Bush, A. B. (Banjo) Paterson : Complete Works 1885-1900 edited by Rosamund Campbell and Philippa Harvie, 1983
- The Penguin Book of Australian Satirical Verse edited by Philip Neilsen, Penguin, 1986
- Banjo Paterson's Poems of the Bush, J. M. Dent, 1987
- The Penguin Book of Australian Ballads edited by Elizabeth Webby and Philip Butterss, Penguin, 1993
- The Collected Verse of Banjo Paterson edited by Clement Semmler, Viking, O'Neill, 1993

== See also ==
- 1892 in poetry
- 1892 in Australian literature
- Australian literature
