= Frank the Poet =

Australian convict and poet

- Born: Francis MacNamara c. 1810; Ireland
- Died: 28 August 1861 (aged approx. 50–51); Mudgee, New South Wales
- Occupation: Writer
- Known for: Publication A Convict's Tour to Hell

Francis MacNamara (c. 1810 – 28 August 1861), known as Frank the Poet, was an Irish writer and poet who was transported as a convict to the penal colony of New South Wales. While incarcerated, he composed improvised verse that captured convict life and exposed the cruelties of the convict system. MacNamara's poems were initially passed on orally among convicts and later published.

== Transportation ==
MacNamara in 1832 was convicted of larceny, and sentenced to seven years transportation to Australia. He often absconded and received an extended sentence as well as floggings and other punishments, and was finally sent to the dreaded Port Arthur in Van Diemen's Land. He received a ticket of leave in 1847 and his freedom in 1849, after which there is little record of his life. His verse suggests he was an educated person with strong political convictions.

== Writings ==
He versified from the start of his convict career: treating the court to an extempore epigram about being sent to Botany Bay, and composing a mock-heroic poem about his case during the voyage out. Except for one longer poem, his verse was passed among convicts by word of mouth. Some of his ballads and epigrams survive in manuscript form in the Mitchell Library, Sydney, having been written down in the late nineteenth century. The popular ballad Moreton Bay or A Convict's Lament, often sung in Australian primary schools, has been attributed to Frank the Poet. His published work, A Convict's Tour to Hell was written in October 1839 while he worked as a shepherd at Stroud.

In A Convict's Tour to Hell Frank dies during captivity and, assuming there is no place for him in heaven, heads downwards, setting up camp by the River Styx, until Charon offers him a free fare on account of his reputation. Not liking the look of Hell, Frank first seeks admission to Purgatory but Pope Pius VII refuses him admittance, explaining that Limbo was invented by priests and popes for their own exclusive use. He then tries Hell, where he sees many of his former jailers, including the brutal Captain Logan, as well as Governor Darling and Captain Cook (condemned for discovering New South Wales) – before the Devil sends him to join the rest of the poor and downtrodden in Heaven, as Hell was made just for the 'Grandees of the Land'. Saint Peter admits him to Heaven on the say-so of several residents, such as Bold Jack Donahue (a convict who turned bushranger).

== Death and legacy ==
Francis MacNamara died in Mudgee on 28 August 1861. News of his death was carried in three newspapers in New South Wales, the Western Post on 31 August, the Empire on 4 September and the Maitland Mercury on 7 September.

In the Jerilderie Letter (1879), bushranger and outlaw Ned Kelly paraphrases lines from MacNamara's poems, describing the torture of Irish convicts in Australia.

On 5 August 2012 ABC Radio National broadcast "Frank the Poet - A Convict's Tour to Hell".

=== Selected list of poems ===
Title	Year	First published	Reprinted/collected in
"A Convict's Tour of Hell"	1832	The Cumberland Times, 27 December 1900	Frank the Poet : The Life and Works of Francis MacNamara edited by John Meredith and Rex Whalan, Red Rooster Press, 1979, pp. 45-51

== See also ==
- List of convicts transported to Australia
