= Edwin Greenslade Murphy =

Poet, journalist from Western Australia

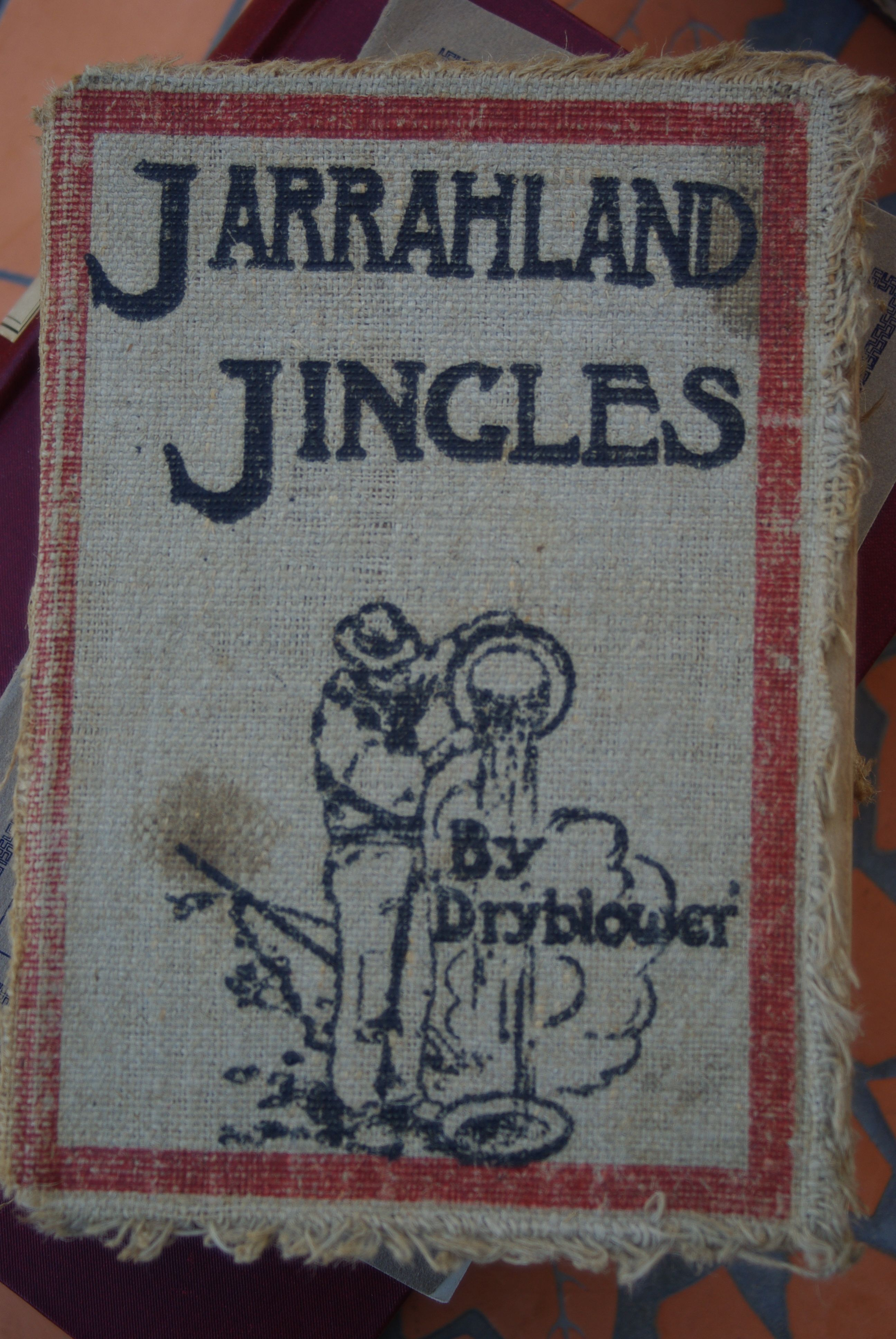
Cover of Jarrahland Jingles

"Dryblower" by David Low

Edwin Greenslade Murphy (also known as Dryblower Murphy or simply Dryblower; 12 December 1866 – 9 March 1939) was an Australian journalist and poet.

== Life and death ==
Murphy was born in Castlemaine, Victoria, Australia, the tenth child and eldest son of Irish-born Edwin Murphy (plasterer and clay modeller), and his English wife Ellen, née Greenslade. He was educated at a state school at South Melbourne.

For a short time the Sporting Life: Dryblower's journal was associated with Dryblower.

In 1910 he settled in Perth, Western Australia and continued to write for the Sunday Times and also did public readings of his poetry. A further selection of poetry, Dryblowers Verses, was published in 1924.

Murphy died on 9 March 1939.

== Legacy ==
Murphy is credited with only a fraction of the poems he wrote, for once he was established at the Perth "Sunday Times" (around 1902), he didn't put his name on his work in any of his several columns (his main one being "Verse and Worse") in the Sunday Times or in his column "A Mingled Yarn" in the Kalgoorlie "Sun". AustLit list only 191 of his poems (almost none from the "Sunday Times"), however we can make an estimate of his very prolific pen for each week he typically had 5 new poems (plus several short ditties), and, as his career spanned almost 40 years, this equates to a maximum of somewhere around 10,000 poems.

In addition to his main column in the Sunday Times, between 1902 and 1904 he produced a series of short 3 verse limerick style caricatures of various personalities in Perth and on the Goldfields. These were illustrated firstly by Fred Roofy and later Dick Hartley, resident artists with Sunday Times. These went under the heading "Pictorial Posters" or "Familiar on the Fields", in all there are over 300 of them. Once again, after identifying himself as the author in the first few, he did not do this for the remainder.
