= William Astley =

Australian writer

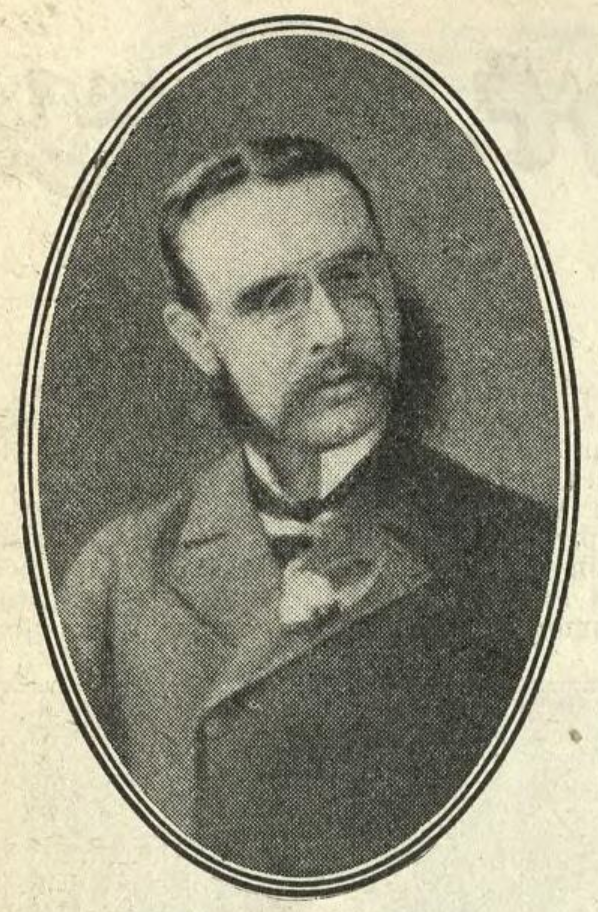
- Born: 13 August 1855; Liverpool, England
- Died: 5 October 1911 (aged 56); Artarmon, New South Wales, Australia
- Occupation: writer
- Writing career
- Language: English
- Years active: 1889–1898

William Astley (13 August 1855 – 5 October 1911) was an Australian short-story writer who wrote under the pseudonym Price Warung.

Astley was the second son of Captain Thomas Astley, a jeweller, and his wife Mary née Price. He was born in Liverpool, England, and was brought to Australia with his family in November 1859. The family settled in Richmond, a suburb of Melbourne. William studied at St Stephen's school and the Melbourne model school.

Astley obtained work in booksellers' shops.

He had regular correspondence with Sir Henry Parkes, Edmund Barton and George Black.

Astley married Louisa Frances Cope of Launceston, Tasmania on 22 September 1884.

He died at Rookwood Benevolent Asylum, Sydney on 5 October 1911.

A.G. Stephens, the literary critic, described Astley as a "sad rogue". In 1881 Astley had been charged in Hobart with embezzling 60 pounds, and eventually sentenced to two years imprisonment. In 1897 he attempted to extort money from the publishers Angus and Robertson, and was strongly implicated in the successful defrauding of the book collector David Scott Mitchell of 125 pounds by means of the sale of non-existent Australiana.

== Books ==
- Tales of the Convict System (Sydney: "The Bulletin" Newspaper Company, 1892, series: "Bulletin" Series No. 2; reprinted: University of Queensland Press, 1975)
- Tales of the Old Regime, and the Bullet of the Fated Ten (Sydney: "The Bulletin" Newspaper Company, 1892; Melbourne: George Robertson & Company, 1897; London: George Routledge and Sons Limited, 1897)
- Tales of Early Australian Days (London: Swan Sonnenschein & Co., 1894; series: Robertson's Library of Australian Authors)
- Half-Crown Bob, and Tales of the Riverine (Melbourne: George Robertson & Company, 1898; series: Robertson's Colonial Library; London: Swan Sonnenschein, 1898; series: Robertson's Library of Australian Authors)
- Tales of the Isle of Death, Norfolk Island (Melbourne: George Robertson & Company, 1898; series: Robertson's Colonial Library)
- Colonial Days (Sydney: Australasian Book Society, 1960)
- The Bullet of the Fated Ten: A Convict Tale of the Ring (Canberra: Mulini Press, 1994, series: Small Tales of Early Australia)
- Tales of the Early Days (Sydney University Press, 2009, series: The Australian Classics Library)
