= Menie Parkes =

Australian poet and writer

- Born: Clarinda Sarah Parkes; 23 July 1839 at sea, off Cape Howe, New South Wales, Australia
- Died: 11 October 1915 (aged 76); Ashfield, New South Wales, Australia
- Relatives: Sir Henry Parkes (father)
- Writing career
- Pen name: Patty Parsley; Alethea; Ariel; C. S. P.

Clarinda Sarah Parkes (23 July 1839 – 11 October 1915) was an Australian poet and writer. She was also known as Menie Parkes and wrote under that and a number of other pseudonyms, including Patty Parsley, Alethea, Ariel and C. S. P.

== Biography ==
Parkes was the daughter of Clarinda (née Varney) and Henry Parkes, later five-time Premier of New South Wales. She was born on board the Strathfieldsaye, off the New South Wales coast, near Cape Howe.

Her first poem appeared in print under her initials, C. S. P., in 1855 in the Empire, a Sydney newspaper owned and edited by her father. In 1859–1860, as Patty Parsley she wrote serialised stories for The Australian Home Companion and Band of Hope Journal. Writing as Ariel, Bitter-Sweet–So Is the World was serialised over 30 weeks in The Sydney Mail in 1860–1861.

On 30 March 1869 Parkes married William Thom, at Werrington. He was a Presbyterian minister and they settled in Pambula, where their first two sons were born, before moving to Ballan, near Ballarat in Victoria.

Parkes's last known published work was a reflection, Sydney Sixty Years Since, published in the Sydney Morning Herald in 1910.

== Death and legacy ==
Parkes died at her home in Ashfield, New South Wales on 11 October 1915. She was buried in St Thomas' cemetery at Enfield.

In 1983 A. W. Martin edited a collection of Thom's letters to her father, Letters from Menie : Sir Henry Parkes and his daughter.

== Works ==
- Parkes, Menie (1866), Poems, Sydney: E. Cunninghame
