= Andy's Gone with Cattle =

Poem by Henry Lawson

- by Henry Lawson
- Written: 1888
- First published in: The Australian Town & Country Journal
- Country: Australia
- Language: English
- Publication date: 13 October 1888

Full text
- Andy's Gone with Cattle at Wikisource

Andy's Gone With Cattle is a poem by Australian writer and poet Henry Lawson. It was first published in The Australian Town and Country Journal on 13 October 1888.

The "Andy" of this poem re-appeared in a sequel, "Andy's Return", which was published in the same journal some six weeks later.

== Critical reception ==
The Oxford Companion to Australian Literature states: "[the poem] laments the departure of a member of a selection family to go overlanding cattle."

== Trivia ==
- Some of the best-known lines in the poem were revisions of Lawson's originals by David McKee Wright when the poem was being prepared for publication in Lawson's Selected Poems in 1918.
- The "Andy" of this poem is not the same "Andy" as described in Lawson's poem "Middleton's Rouseabout".

== Further publications ==
- In the Days When the World was Wide and Other Verses by Henry Lawson (1896)
- An Anthology of Australian Verse edited by Bertram Stevens (1907)
- Selected Poems of Henry Lawson (1918)
- Favourite Australian Poems edited by Ian Mudie (1963)
- From the Ballads to Brennan edited by T. Inglis Moore, Angus & Robertson, 1964
- Poems of Henry Lawson edited by Walter Stone (1973)
- Australia Fair: Poems and Paintings edited by Douglas Stewart (1974)
- The World of Henry Lawson edited by Walter Stone (1974)
- The Essential Henry Lawson edited by Brian Kiernan (1982)
- A Treasury of Colonial Poetry (1982)
- A Camp-Fire Yarn: Henry Lawson Complete Works 1885-1900 edited by Leonard Cronin (1984)
- The Illustrated Treasury of Australian Verse edited by Beatrice Davis (1984)
- Henry Lawson: An Illustrated Treasury compiled by Glenys Smith (1985)
- The Bushwackers Australian Song Book edited by Jan Wositzky and Dobe Newton (1988)
- A Collection of Australian Bush Verse (1989)
- A Treasury of Bush Verse edited by G. A. Wilkes, Angus and Robertson, 1991
- Australian Bush Poems (1991)
- The Penguin Book of Australian Ballads edited by Elizabeth Webby and Philip Butterss (1993)
- The Illustrated Treasury of Australian Verse compiled by Beatrice Davis (1996)
- Classic Australian Verse edited by Maggie Pinkney (2001)

== See also ==
- 1888 in poetry
- 1888 in literature
- 1888 in Australian literature
- Australian literature
