= Clancy of the Overflow =

Poem written by Andrew Barton Paterson

- by Banjo Paterson
- Written: 1889
- First published in: The Bulletin
- Country: Australia
- Language: English
- Form: Quatrain
- Rhyme scheme: AA–B–CC–B
- Publication date: 21 December 1889
- Lines: 32
- Clancy of the Overflow at English Wikisource

"Clancy of the Overflow" is a famous Australian poem written by Banjo Paterson and first published in The Bulletin, an Australian news magazine, on 21 December 1889. The poem is typical of Paterson, offering a romantic view of rural life, and is one of his best-known works.

The poem is written in eight stanzas of four lines with AA–B–CC–B rhymes.

== History ==
The poem is written from the point of view of a city-dweller who once met the title character, a shearer and drover, and now envies the imagined pleasures of Clancy's lifestyle, which he compares favourably to life in "the dusty, dirty city" and "the round eternal of the cashbook and the journal".

And the bush hath friends to meet him, and their kindly voices greet him
In the murmur of the breezes and the river on its bars,
And he sees the vision splendid of the sunlit plains extended,
And at night the wond'rous glory of the everlasting stars.

The poem is possibly based on Paterson's own experience. The introduction to Banjo Paterson's Images of Australia by Douglas Baglin quotes Paterson as saying that he was working as a lawyer when someone asked him to send a letter to a man named Thomas Gerald Clancy, asking for a payment that had not been received. Paterson sent the letter to "The Overflow", a sheep station 100 kilometres south-west of Nyngan, and received a reply that read:

Clancy's gone to Queensland droving, and we don't know where he are.

The letter looked as though it had been written with a thumbnail dipped in tar and it is from this that Banjo Paterson found the inspiration for the poem, along with the meter.

Clancy makes a cameo appearance in another popular Banjo Paterson poem, "The Man from Snowy River", which was first published the following year.

There are claims that Clancy was based on a man called Thomas Michael MacNamara, who described the ride with the "Man from Snowy River" (his brother-in-law Jim Troy) in an article in The Courier-Mail in 1938

In 1897, Thomas Gerald Clancy wrote a poem in reply to "Clancy of the Overflow", titled "Clancy's Reply", which paints a far less romantic picture of the life of a drover. There had also been a parody in 1892, "The Overflow of Clancy", which formed part of the Bulletin Debate.

== Publication history ==
After its original publication in The Bulletin on 21 December 1889, the poem was reprinted in numerous newspapers and magazines as well as the following anthologies and collections (among many others):

- A Golden Shanty : Australian Stories and Sketches in Prose and Verse (1890)
- The Man from Snowy River and Other Verses by A. B. Paterson (1895)
- An Anthology of Australian Verse edited by Bertram Stevens (1907)
- The Golden Treasury of Australian Verse edited by Bertram Stevens (1909)
- The Oxford Book of Australasian Verse edited by Walter Murdoch (1924)
- Selections from Australian Poets edited by Bertram Stevens and George Mackaness (1925)
- New Song in an Old Land edited by Rex Ingamells (1943)
- An Anthology of Australian Verse edited by George Mackaness (1952)
- Australian Poets Speak edited Colin Thiele and Ian Mudie (1961)
- Favorite Australian Poems edited by Ian Mudie (1963)
- From the Ballads to Brennan edited by T. Inglis Moore (1964)
- Singer of the Bush, A. B. (Banjo) Paterson : Complete Works 1885–1900 (1983)
- Cross-Country : A Book of Australian Verse edited by John Barnes and Brian MacFarlane, Heinemann, 1988
- My Country : Australian Poetry and Short Stories, Two Hundred Years edited by Leonie Kramer (1985)
- The Macmillan Anthology of Australian Literature edited by Ken L. Goodwin and Alan Lawson (1990)
- A Treasury of Bush Verse edited by G. A. Wilkes, Angus and Robertson, 1991
- The Puncher & Wattmann Anthology of Australian Poetry edited by John Leonard (2009) ISBN 978-1921450297

== In other media ==
Clancy was portrayed by Jack Thompson in the movie The Man from Snowy River, and Clancy is mentioned in the musical theatre production The Man from Snowy River: Arena Spectacular – during the recitation of the poem, Clancy is mentioned by Steve Bisley in his role of Banjo Paterson while the poem is being re-enacted in the show.

Contemporary recordings of the poem include Jack Thompson's recitation on Jack Thompson: The Bush Poems of A.B. (Banjo) Paterson (2008) and Jack Thompson, Favourite Australian Poems, Fine Poets Collection, volume 5 (2010).

The poem "Clancy of the Overflow" has also been set to music and recorded several times, including:

- John Cameron's recording of Albert Arlen's setting, with an orchestra conducted by George S. English (1955)
- Peter Dawson's recording of the same setting, with the London Symphony Orchestra conducted by Charles Mackerras (4 May 1955)
- In 1974 Slim Dusty released a song version on LP
- In 1980 the Australian folk group Wallis and Matilda recorded a popular song version of the poem, eventually peaking at 30 on the ARIA charts
- John Schumann of Redgum recorded it on his 1993 album True Believers
- The ensemble Tenor Australis included a musical arrangement of the poem on their 1999 album Under an Australian Sky
- The fifteenth track from The Herd's 2001 self-titled debut album, "Gutter Rats", features an unknown voice repeating a line from the poem: "And the language uninviting of the gutter children fighting".
- The 2006 album The Overflow by New Zealand musicians Humphreys & Keen of the Able Tasmans references the poem in its title and also celebrates Paterson's work in one of its songs, "Clancy".
- Comedian Adam Hills performed it on his ABC show Adam Hills Tonight in July 2013 as a mashup with Ali McGregor singing The Church hit "Under the Milky Way"
- Melbourne-based production company Yut Art produced a contemporary version in 2013.

== Proposed film ==
In 2004, there were plans to make a movie of "Clancy of the Overflow", a sequel to the 1982 film The Man from Snowy River, but this fell through due to financial reasons. The director was to have been Simon Wincer, who was a co-producer for The Man from Snowy River. Bruce Rowland (who composed the music for both the 1982 film The Man from Snowy River and its 1988 sequel film The Man from Snowy River II, as well as composing music for The Man from Snowy River: Arena Spectacular, was to compose the music for the film. The film was to have been funded by private investors, but the A$22 million minimum investment was not met by the deadline of June 2004, and the film has been shelved indefinitely.

== See also ==
- Bulletin Debate
- 1889 in Australian literature
