= The City Bushman =

1892 poem by Henry Lawson

- by Henry Lawson
- Original title: "In Answer to 'Banjo' and Otherwise"
- Written: 1892
- First published in: The Bulletin
- Country: Australia
- Language: English
- Series: The Bulletin Debate
- Publication date: 6 August 1892

Full text
- In Answer to Banjo, and Otherwise at Wikisource

The City Bushman is a poem by iconic Australian writer and poet Henry Lawson. It was first published in The Bulletin magazine on 6 August 1892, under the title In Answer to "Banjo", and Otherwise. It was the fourth work in the Bulletin Debate, a series of poems by both Lawson and Andrew Barton "Banjo" Paterson, and others, about the true nature of life in the Australian bush.

In The City Bushman, Lawson responds to Paterson's poem, In Defence of the Bush, quoting a number of phrases, and criticising each in turn.

== Publication details ==
After its initial publication in The Bulletin on 9 July 1892, the poem was then included in the following collections and anthologies:

- In the Days When the World was Wide and Other Verses, 1896
- Humorous Verses by Henry Lawson, Angus and Robertson, 1941
- The World of Henry Lawson edited by Walter Stone, Hamlyn, 1974
- The Essential Henry Lawson : The Best Works of Australia's Greatest Writer edited Brian Kiernan, Currey O'Neil, 1982
- A Campfire Yarn : Henry Lawson Complete Works 1885-1900 edited by Leonard Cronin, Lansdowne, 1984
- The Penguin Book of Australian Satirical Verse edited by Philip Neilsen, Penguin, 1986

== See also ==
- 1892 in poetry
- 1892 in literature
- 1892 in Australian literature
- Australian literature
