= Bulletin Debate =

Literary dispute between Henry Lawson and Banjo Peterson

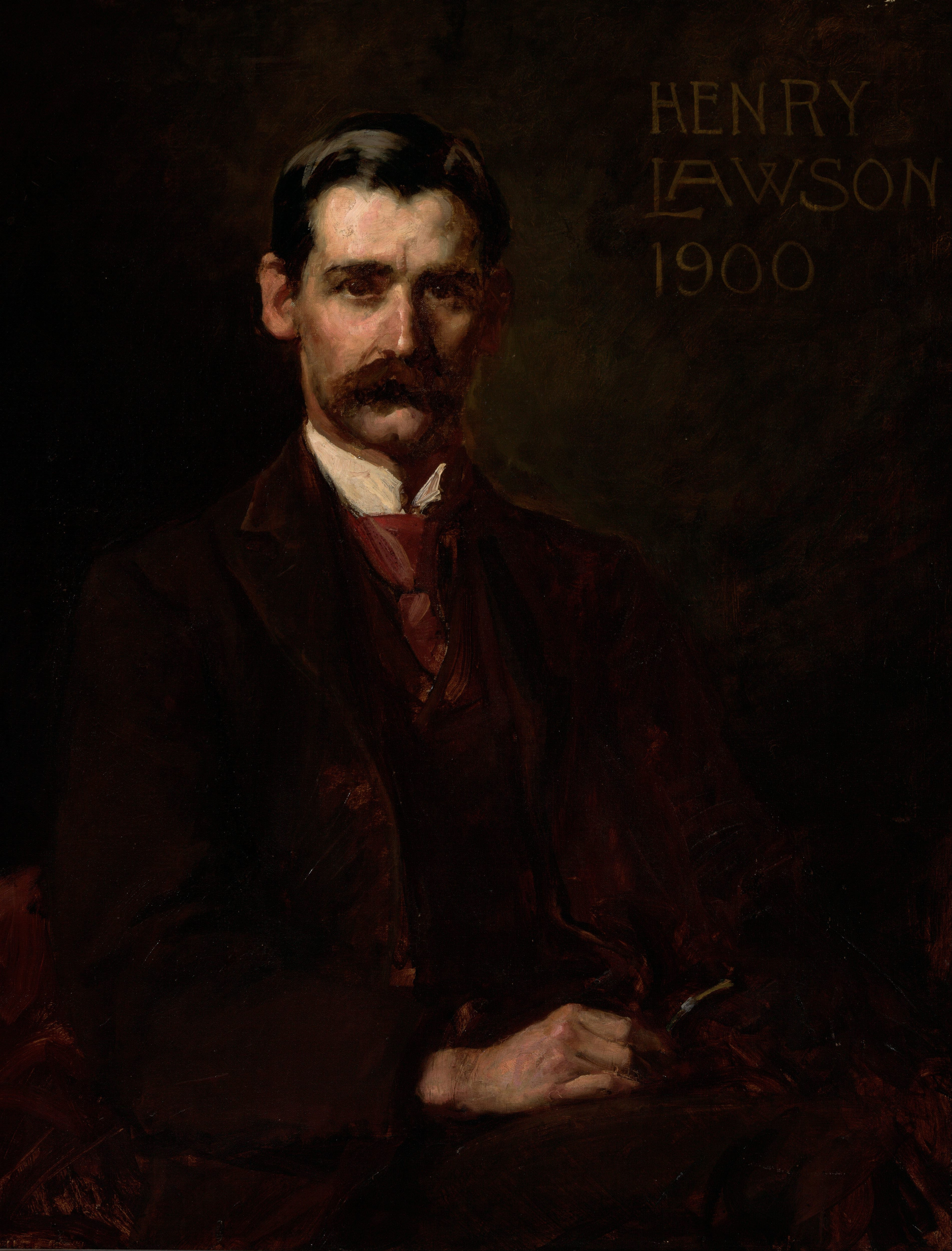
Henry Lawson

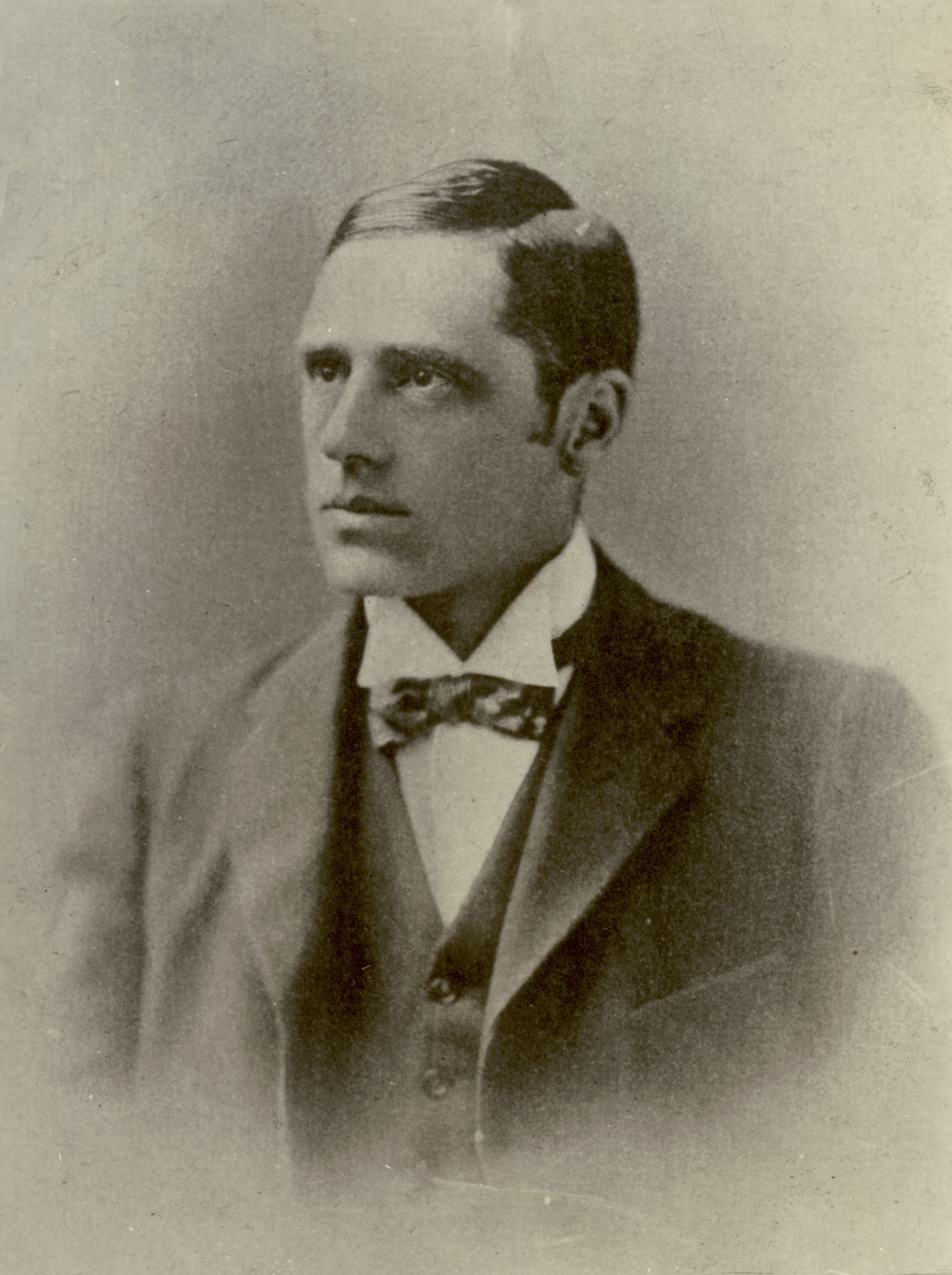
Banjo Patterson

The "Bulletin Debate" was a well-publicised dispute in The Bulletin magazine between two of Australia's best known writers and poets, Henry Lawson and Banjo Paterson. The debate took place via a series of poems about the merits of living in the Australian "bush", published from 1892 to 1893.

== Origin ==
At the time, The Bulletin was a popular and influential publication, and often supported the typical national self-image held by many Australians, sometimes termed the "bush legend." Many Australian writers and poets, such as Banjo Paterson, were based primarily in the city, and had a tendency to romanticise bush life.

On 9 July 1892, Lawson published a poem in The Bulletin entitled "Borderland", later retitled "Up The Country". In this poem (beginning with the verse "I am back from up the country—very sorry that I went,—"), Lawson attacked the typical "romanticised" view of bush life.

== Paterson's response ==
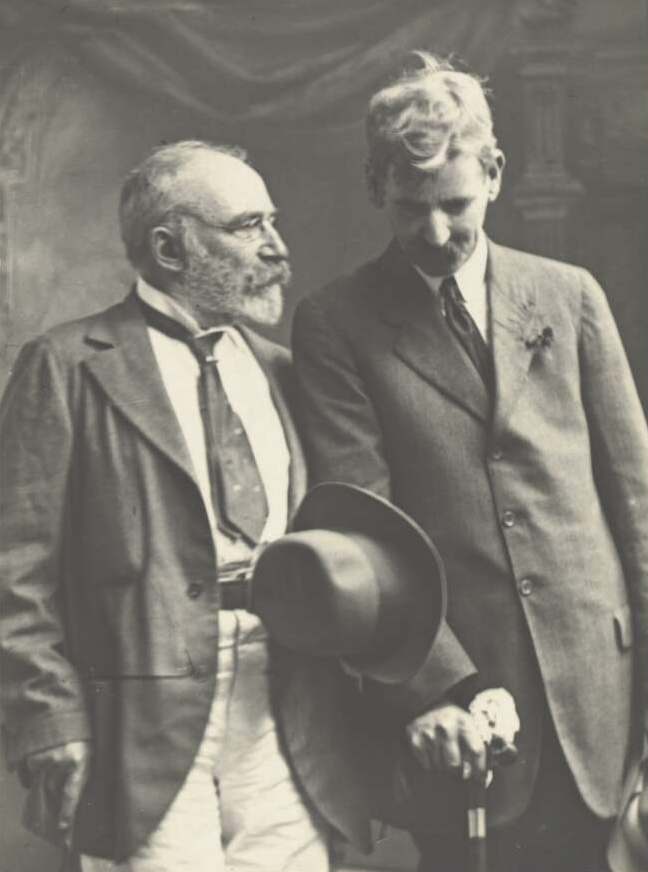
Henry Lawson (right) with J.F. Archibald, editor of The Bulletin

On 23 July 1892, Paterson published his reply to Lawson's poem, titled "In Defence of the Bush". While Lawson had accused writers such as Paterson of being "City Bushmen", Paterson countered by claiming that Lawson's view of the bushlife was full of doom and gloom. He finished his poem with the line "For the bush will never suit you, and you'll never suit the bush." Other Australian writers, such as Edward Dyson, also later contributed to the debate.

In 1939, Banjo Paterson recalled his thoughts about the Bulletin debate:

Henry Lawson was a man of remarkable insight in some things and of extraordinary simplicity in others. We were both looking for the same reef, if you get what I mean; but I had done my prospecting on horseback with my meals cooked for me, while Lawson has done his prospecting on foot and had had to cook for himself. Nobody realized this better than Lawson; and one day he suggested that we should write against each other, he putting the bush from his point of view, and I putting it from mine.

"We ought to do pretty well out of it," he said. "We ought to be able to get in three or four sets of verses before they stop us."

This suited me all right, for we were working on space, and the pay was very small ... so we slam-banged away at each other for weeks and weeks; not until they stopped us, but until we ran out of material ...

== Cultural significance ==
The Bulletin Debate was followed closely by widespread readers of the publication, reinforcing "the Bush" as a significant part of Australia's national identity. There was never any clear "winner" to this debate. However, Paterson presented Australia with the desired image of its national identity, and his short story collections received spectacular sales. Despite their vastly differing perspectives on Australian bush life, both Lawson and Paterson are often mentioned alongside each other as Australia's most iconic and influential writers.

== Criticisms ==
The Debate did not pass without receiving criticism in regards to its attempts to define Australia's national identity. One British reviewer of the 1890s declared:

The delusion these writers [of 'The Bulletin' school] labour under is trying to be too exclusively Australian, by which they come merely provincial. That a man's lot should be cast in the wilds of Australia is no reason that his whole inner life should be taken up with the glorification of shearers or the ridicule of jackaroos. And a genuine Australian poetry can only arise when such matters fall into their true place and assume their relatively small artistic importance.

Tony Moore, in his 1997 paper about bohemian culture, says:

The bohemian traits revered by 'The Bulletin' writers are almost a caricature of the Australian national type propagated by the journal: mateship and blokey bonding to the exclusion of family life; hostility to religion, personified by the Protestant wowser; ironic humour; a fondness for alcohol, pubs and gambling; pre-occupation with a free-wheeling Australian identity (overlaid with francophilia and Irish nationalism) invariably opposed to a conservative Englishness; and an occasional flirtation with political causes such as socialism and republicanism. The identification of the bohemian with male mateship remains a strong thread in the Australian tradition, but one contested by women like Mary Gilmore in the 1890s, Dulcie Deamer in the 1920s, Joy Hester in the 1940s and Germaine Greer in the 1960s.

== Works involved in the debate ==
Works of poetry involved in the Bulletin Debate
Publication Date	Author	Title
9 July 1892	Henry Lawson	"Borderland" (retitled "Up The Country")
23 July 1892	Banjo Paterson	"In Defence of the Bush"
30 July 1892	Edward Dyson	"The Fact of the Matter"
6 August 1892	Henry Lawson	"In Answer to 'Banjo', and Otherwise" (retitled "The City Bushman")
20 August 1892	"H.H.C.C."	"The Overflow of Clancy"
27 August 1892	Francis Kenna	"Banjo, of the Overflow"
1 October 1892	Banjo Paterson	"In Answer to Various Bards" (retitled "An Answer to Various Bards")
8 October 1892	Henry Lawson	"The Poets of the Tomb"
20 October 1894	Banjo Paterson	"A Voice from the Town"

== See also ==
- 1892 in poetry
- 1892 in literature
- Australian literature
