= Jennings Carmichael =

Australian poet and nurse

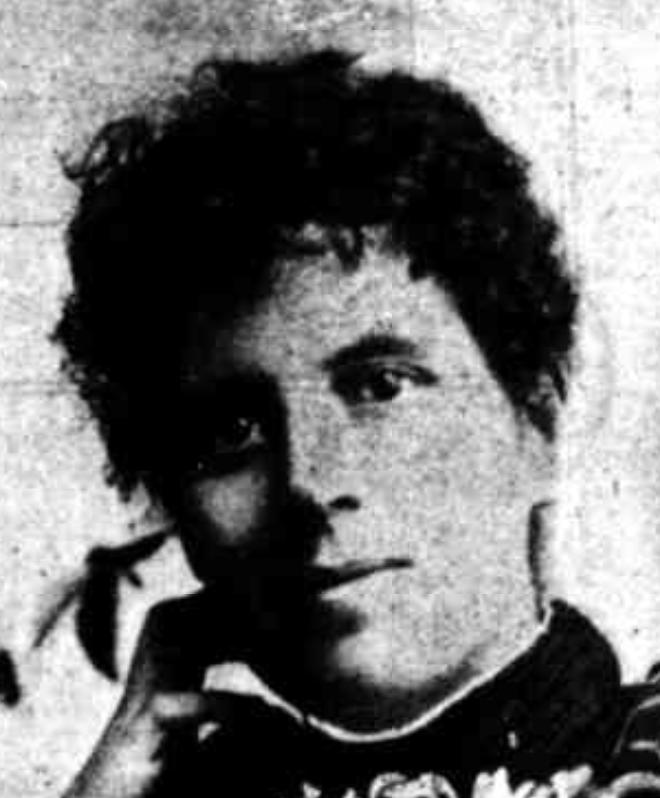
- Born: Grace Elizabeth Jennings Carmichael; 24 February 1868; Ballarat, Victoria, Australia
- Died: 9 February 1904 (aged 35); London, England
- Occupation: writer
- Writing career
- Language: English
- Years active: 1886-1904

Grace Carmichael Mullis (24 February 1867 – 9 February 1904), known by her pen name Jennings Carmichael, was an Australian poet and nurse.

== Early life and education ==
Grace Elizabeth Jennings Carmichael was born on 24 February 1867 at Ballarat, Victoria. She was the daughter of Archibald Carmichael, a Scottish miner, and Margaret Jennings, née Clark, originally from Cornwall. Her father died when she was 8 and her mother remarried Charles Henderson.

Carmichael attended school in Melbourne before the family moved to a pastoral station at Orbost, Victoria. An early story of hers was published in the Bairnsdale Advertiser. In 1888, Carmichael returned to Melbourne to train as a nurse at the Royal Children's Hospital.

== Career ==
Carmichael qualified in 1890 and got a job near Geelong. Carmichael joined the Buonarottii Club sometime before 1887. In 1891, she published a book of stories entitled Hospital Children. Carmichael was a member of the Austral Salon in the 1890s.

In September 1895, she gave a public lecture on "The Spirit of the Bush" at the Masonic Hall in Melbourne with Alfred Deakin as chairman. The same year, Carmichael published another volume of poems.

== Personal life and death ==
Carmichael married architect Henry Francis Mullis on 1 April 1895 in Fitzroy. Carmichael had four sons and a daughter.

The family moved to England where her husband deserted the family and Carmichael died in 1904. She was only 36. She was survived by three sons. Money was raised to repatriate the boys, who were in a workhouse, back to Australia. Carmichael was buried in London's Woodgrange Park Cemetery.

A selection of her poetry was published in 1910. In 1937, a memorial plaque was unveiled in her honour at Orbost. In 1938, another plaque was erected at the public library in Ballarat.

== Works ==
- Hospital Children : sketches of life and character in the Children's Hospital, Melbourne (1891)
- Poems (1895)
- For Some One's Sake (1955)
