= Up the Country =

1892 poem by Henry Lawson

"Up The Country"
- by Henry Lawson
- Original title: "Borderland"
- Written: 1892
- First published in: The Bulletin
- Country: Australia
- Language: English
- Series: The Bulletin Debate
- Publication date: 9 July 1892

Full text
- Up The Country at Wikisource

"Up The Country" is a popular poem by iconic Australian writer and poet Henry Lawson. It was first published in The Bulletin magazine on 9 July 1892, under the title "Borderland." Its publication marked the start of the Bulletin Debate, a series of poems by both Lawson and Andrew Barton "Banjo" Paterson asserting contrasting views of the true nature of life in the Australian bush.

In Up The Country, Lawson recounts his trip to the barren and gloomy Australian bush, and criticises "City Bushmen" such as Banjo Paterson who tended to romanticize bush life.

Paterson later responded with a poem of his own, entitled In Defense of the Bush, in which he accused Lawson of representing bush life as nothing but doom and gloom, famously ending with the line "For the bush will never suit you, and you'll never suit the bush."

== Publication details ==
After its initial publication in The Bulletin on 9 July 1892, the poem was then included in the following collections and anthologies:

- In the Days When the World was Wide and Other Verses, 1896
- Humorous Verses by Henry Lawson, Angus and Robertson, 1941
- The World of Henry Lawson edited by Walter Stone, Hamlyn, 1974
- The Collins Book of Australian Poetry edited by Rodney Hall, Collins, 1981
- A Campfire Yarn : Henry Lawson Complete Works 1885-1900 edited by Leonard Cronin, Lansdowne, 1984
- Cross-Country : A Book of Australian Verse edited by John Barnes and Brian MacFarlane, Heinemann, 1984
- The Penguin Book of Australian Satirical Verse edited by Philip Neilsen, Penguin, 1986
- Australian Verse : An Oxford Anthology edited by John Leonard, Melbourne University Press, 1998
- The Puncher & Wattmann Anthology of Australian Poetry edited by John Leonard, Puncher & Wattmann, 2009

== See also ==
- 1892 in poetry
- 1892 in Australian literature
- 1892 in literature
- The Bulletin Debate
- Australian literature
