= Francis Kenna =

Australian politician (born 1965–1932)

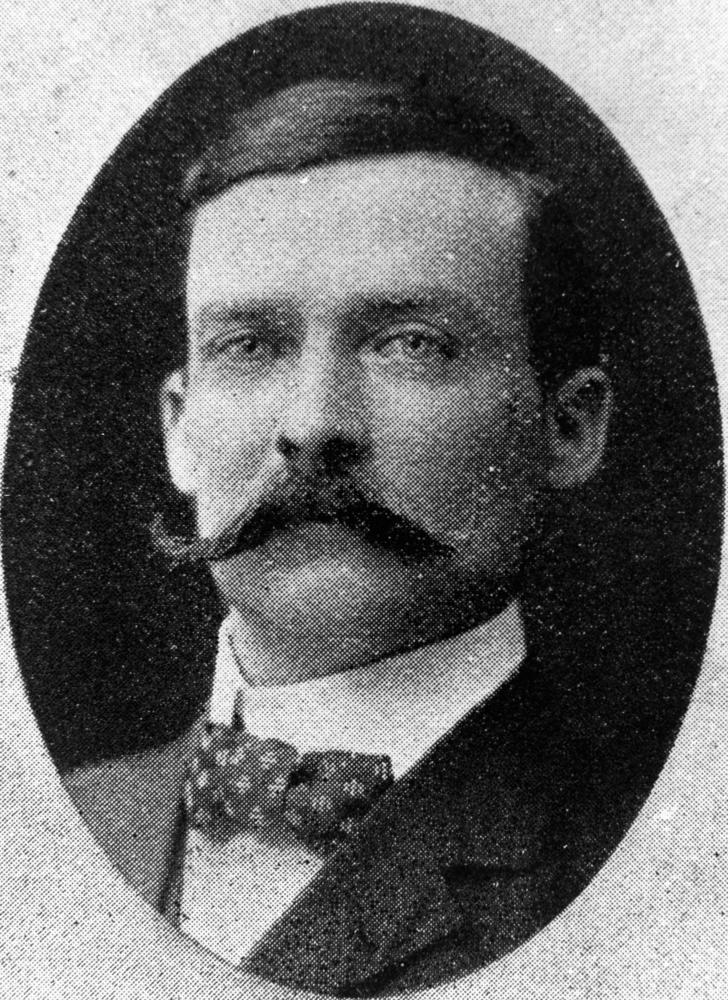

Member of the Queensland Legislative Assembly for Bowen
- In office 11 March 1902 – 2 October 1909
- Preceded by: Robert Smith
- Succeeded by: Myles Ferricks

Personal details
- Born: Francis Kenna; 21 September 1865 Maryborough, Queensland, Australia
- Died: 23 June 1932 (aged 66) Brisbane, Queensland, Australia
- Resting place: Lutwyche Cemetery
- Party: Labor (1902-1907); Kidstonites (1907-1908); Ind. Opposition (1908-1909)
- Spouse: Edith Elvira Stamp
- Occupation: Poet, journalist

Francis Kenna (21 September 1865 – 23 June 1932), was an Australian poet, journalist, and Labor Member of the Legislative Assembly in Queensland. He edited the "Brisbane Worker".

He published Banjo, of the Overflow, a parody of Banjo Paterson's Clancy of the Overflow in 1892, as part of the Bulletin Debate about the true nature of life in the Australian bush. Like many of his poems (including those later published in Phases), it was first published in the Sydney Bulletin.

In 1907 he married Edith Elvira Stamp; they had two sons, Herbert and Vernon. Kenna died in 1932 and was buried in Lutwyche Cemetery.

== Works ==
- Songs of a Season (1895, Melville, Mullen & Slade; Melbourne)
- Phases (1915, Thos S Laidler, NSW)
- Queensland Authors and Artists' Xmas Magazine (1926, Watson Ferguson, Brisbane) edited by Francis Kenna and issued by the Queensland Authors and Artists' Association

Parliament of Queensland
Preceded by Robert Smith	Member for Bowen; 1902–1909	Succeeded by Myles Ferricks
