= Philip Neilsen =

Australian poet

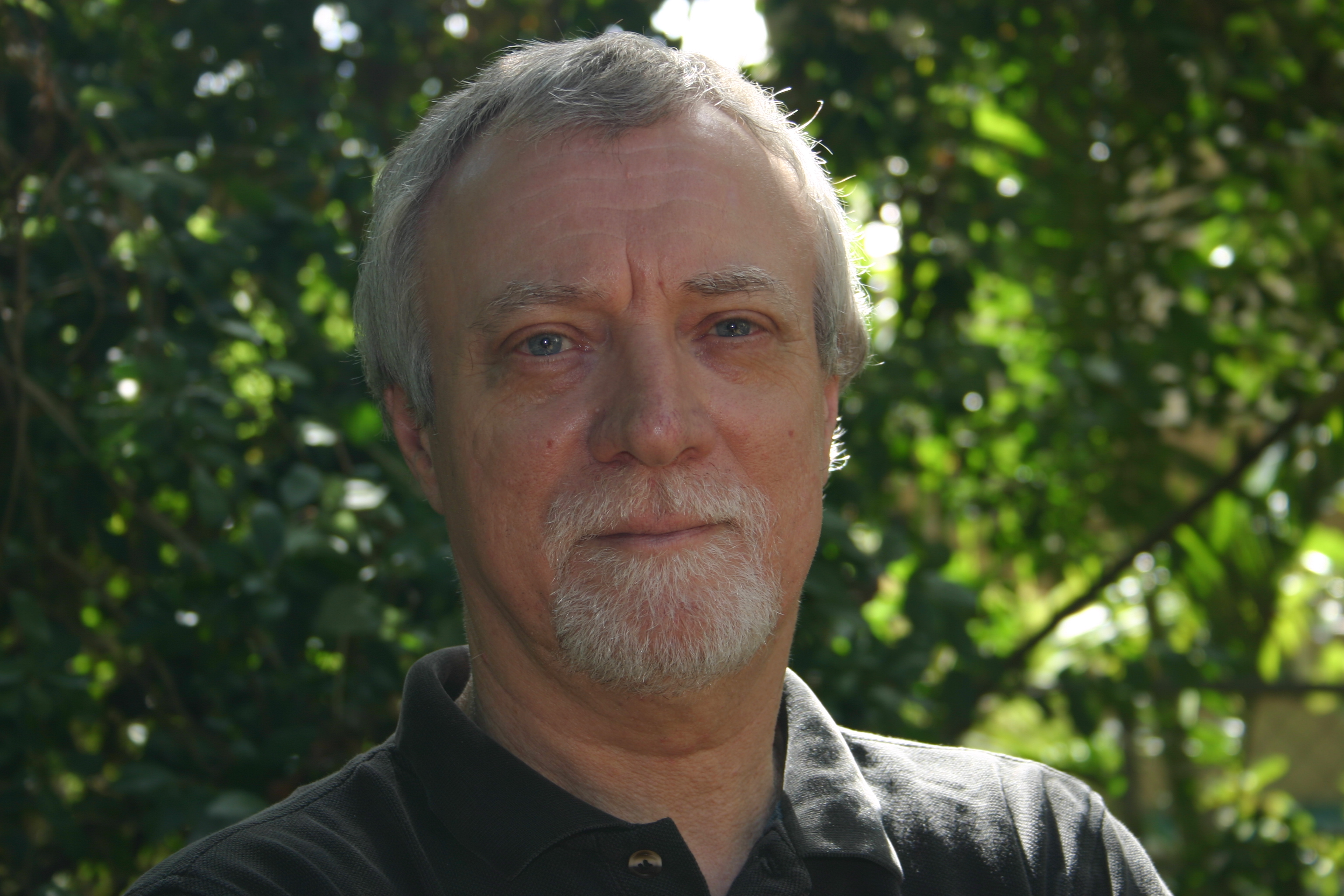
- Born: Brisbane, Queensland, Australia^{1}
- Occupations: Poet, Academic, Editor
- Writing career
- Genres: Poetry, Fiction.

Philip Max Neilsen is an Australian poet, fiction writer and editor. He teaches poetry at the University of Queensland and was previously professor of creative writing at the Queensland University of Technology.

== Biography ==
Neilsen was born in Brisbane, Queensland, Australia. His grandparents and great-grandparents were emigrants from Norway, Scotland, England and Germany. He attended Brisbane Grammar School and the University of Queensland where he gained honours, masters and doctoral degrees in English and taught for nine years. His PhD was on the representation of women in Arnold Bennett's novels. He founded the creative writing program at the Queensland University of Technology in 1997, the first in Queensland. He has been a member of the Literature Board of the Australia Council for the Arts. Previously, he has been Chair of the Queensland Writers Centre and Chair of PEN Australia North. He established the Imago: New Writing Literary Magazine with poet Helen Horton. Neilsen is married to lawyer and writer Mhairead MacLeod, and was previously married to public servant Samantha Organ-Moore (now Samantha Palmer).

== Writing and editing ==
Neilsen's work ranges from satire and fabulism to lyricism and social realism, and explores social, environmental, and personal subjects. Literary influences he has mentioned include W. H. Auden, Billy Collins, Elizabeth Bishop, Franz Kafka, Simon Armitage, Sharon Olds, John Berryman, Anne Carson, David Morley, Gwen Harwood and Judith Wright. His poetry earned a Young Writer's Fellowship from the Australia Council in 1976. Edward Britton, a young adult novel co-authored with Gary Crew, was a CBC Australian Notable Book in 2001. His work has been translated into Chinese, German, Korean, and Serbian. His poetry was included in the 2008 Norton anthology The Making of a Sonnet (eds. Edward Hirsch and Eavan Boland), The Penguin Anthology of Australian Poetry (ed. John Kinsella, 2009), Australian Poetry Since 1788 (eds. Geoffrey Lehmann and Robert Gray, 2011), The Turnrow Anthology of Contemporary Australian Poetry (University of Louisiana, 2014), and The Best Australian Poems 2017 (ed. Sarah Holland-Batt) (Black Inc.)

He wrote the first monograph of literary criticism on David Malouf’s work, Imagined Lives (UQP, 1990 and 1996), and edited the first collections of Australian satirical poetry, The Penguin Book of Australian Satirical Verse (1986) and The Sting in the Wattle (UQP, 1993). Neilsen's poetry has been praised by Les Murray, John Kinsella, Sarah Holland-Batt, Bronwyn Lea, Martin Duwell, and Bruce Dawe, among others. His work has been shortlisted for an Aurealis Award, the Fair Australia Prize, the Woorilla Poetry Prize, and the ASAL Gold Medal. He has won prizes in the Philip Bacon Ekphrasis Poetry Award and the MPU International Poetry Competition. His book Wildlife of Berlin was shortlisted for the Kenneth Slessor Poetry Prize in the 2019 New South Wales Premier's Literary Awards.

His areas of research include creative writing therapy in the promotion of mental health, eco-criticism, and environmental poetry. He currently teaches poetry writing at the University of Queensland.

Neilsen's papers are kept in Special Collections, UNSW Canberra.

=== Poetry collections ===
Faces of a Sitting Man (Makar Press, 1975)
The Art of Lying (Makar Press, 1979)
Australian Poets on Tape: Philip Roberts & Philip Neilsen (UQP, 1980)
Life Movies (QCP, 1981)
We'll All Go Together (with Barry O’Donohue) (QCP, 1983)
Without an Alibi (Salt: Cambridge, 2008)
Wildlife of Berlin (University of Western Australia Publishing, 2018)

=== Children's and young adult books ===
Emma and the Megahero (Reed Books, 1995)
The Lie (Lothian, 1997)
The Wombat King (Lothian, 1997)
Edward Britton (with Gary Crew) (Lothian, 2000)
Splot the Viking (Penguin, 2008)

=== Scholarly books ===
Imagined Lives: A Study of David Malouf (University of Queensland Press, 1990; revised 1996)
The Cambridge Companion to Creative Writing co-edited with David Morley (Cambridge University Press, 2013)
Creative Arts in Counseling and Mental Health co-edited with Robert King and Felicity Baker (SAGE, 2015)

=== Edited anthologies ===
- The Penguin Book of Australian Satirical Verse edited by Philip Neilsen, Penguin, 1986
- The Sting in the Wattle : Australian Satirical Verse edited by Philip Neilsen, University of Queensland Press, 1993
