= Curlewis =

Curlewis may refer to:

- Curlewis, New South Wales, Australia, in the New England region
- Curlewis, Victoria, Australia, a suburb of Geelong
- 3898 Curlewis, a minor planet

== People with the surname Curlewis ==
- Adrian Curlewis (1901–1985), Australian judge, surfer, and sports administrator
- Jean Curlewis (1898–1930), Australian author
- Harold Curlewis (1875–1968), Australian astronomer
- Herbert Curlewis (1869–1942), Australian judge and writer
- John Stephen Curlewis (1863–1940), Chief Justice of the Union of South Africa
