= Woodlands, Killara =

Woodlands
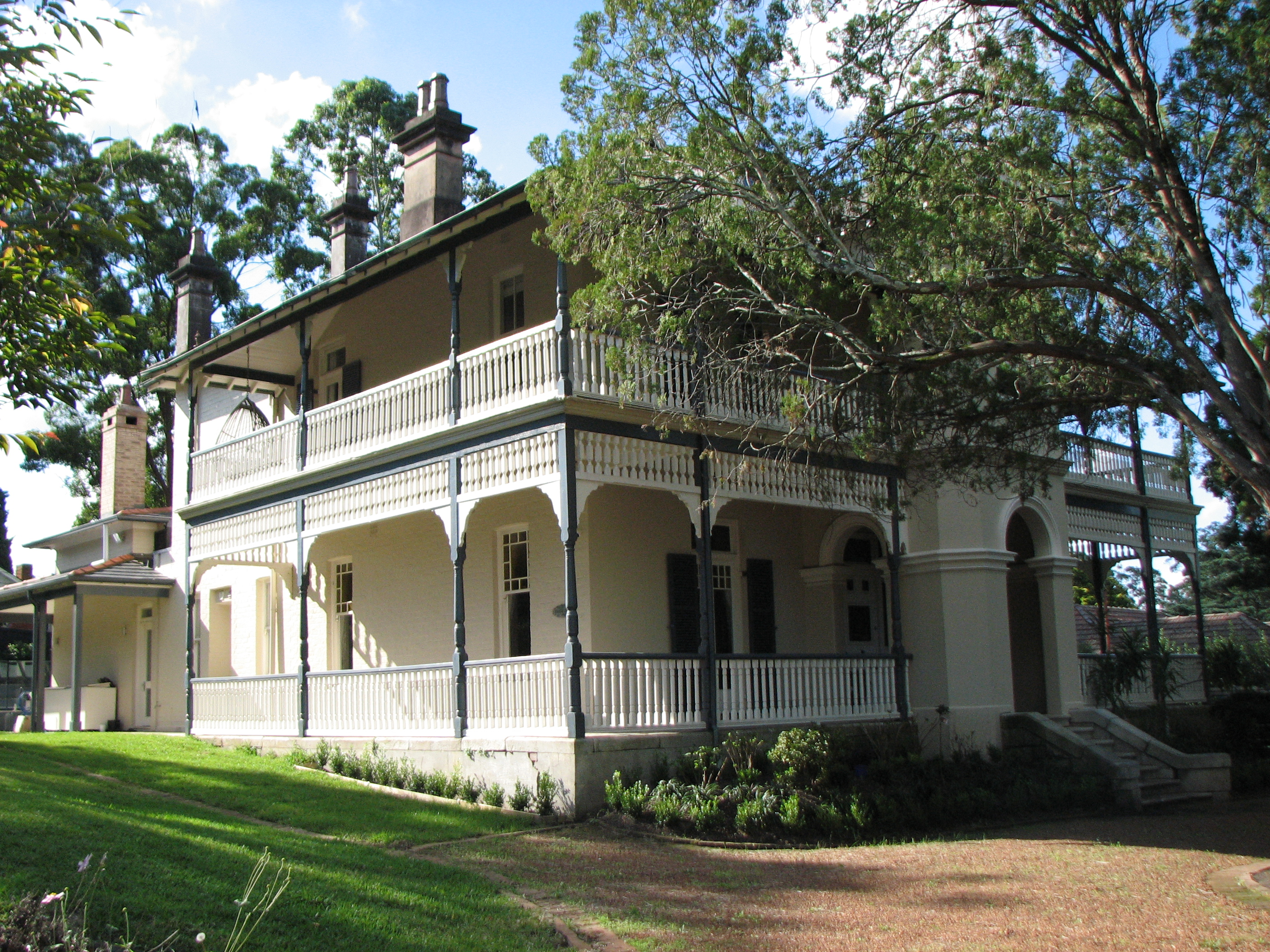
- Woodlands, 1 Werona Avenue Killara, New South Wales

- Location within Sydney Location within Australia
- 33°46′11″S 151°09′57″E
- Location: 1 Werona Avenue, Killara, Ku-ring-gai Council, New South Wales, Australia

History
- Built: 1884–

Site notes
- Architect: Henry Austen Wilshire
- Architectural style: Federation Filigree
- Owner: Peter and Carol Himmelhoch

New South Wales Heritage Register
- Official name: Woodlands; Inglewood; Inglenook
- Type: State heritage (built)
- Designated: 13 October 2006
- Reference no.: 1762
- Type: House
- Category: Residential buildings (private)

Woodlands is a heritage-listed residence at 1 Werona Avenue, in the Sydney suburb of Killara in the Ku-ring-gai Council local government area of New South Wales, Australia. It was designed by Henry Austin Wilshire, and built from 1884. It is also known as Inglewood; Inglenook. The property is privately owned. It was added to the New South Wales State Heritage Register on 13 October 2006.

== History ==
Woodlands (originally called Inglewood) pre-dates the development and growth of the Ku-ring-gai municipality. It lies within the boundaries of the original grant given to Ku-ring-gai pioneer, Henry Oliver (1821). It remains as one of the most substantial residential properties built prior to the 1890 subdivision of Oliver's holding.

Subdivision of this original block was indicative of the development of large private land holdings into suburban allotments in anticipation of the Hornsby to St Leonards railway line which commenced operation on 1 January 1890. Edward Allyn Braham of Sydney purchased a block of four acres, two roods and twenty seven perches (1.88 hectares) on 4 October 1884 for A£500. Woodlands was built on this block of land. Braham was a gentleman's outfitter of the firm Braham and Mulch.

At the time that Braham purchased the property the Railway Commissioners had not yet acquired part of the land for the Hornsby to St Leonards railway line. On 19 January 1889, the Railway Commissioners acquired a portion of Braham's property for the sum of £134, 17s and 6p.

In December 1890, Braham sold the remainder of the property to George Munro, coinciding with the year in which the railway officially opened. Ethel Turner, her stepfather Charles Cope, mother Sarah, sisters Lilian and Rose, and brother Rex, were amongst the new residents that were attracted to Ku-ring-gai with the promise of a healthy new lifestyle, "clear of air and free from pollution". The Cope family were tenants of the then Inglewood (now Woodlands) from 29 September 1891 until December 1894.

During the time that Ethel Turner resided at Inglewood, she was deeply influenced by the native Australian bushland that provided a fundamental component of the setting for Seven Little Australians. The Cope family's move from Paddington to Lindfield was a pivotal part in the writing of Seven Little Australians. The isolation of the suburb of Lindfield "had an effect, like adding half a dozen hours or so to days that since leaving school had been filled to the very brim; red, lonely roads running up hill and down dale; silent bushland everywhere filled with towering gums and wattles and the songs and flittings of birds; sunrises and sunsets uninterrupted by houses - of course one wrote a book!".

The three years spent at Lindfield (now Killara) are well documented in "The Diaries of Ethel Turner" (Philippa Poole) with references to social engagements, courtship with her future husband, Herbert Curlewis and most importantly commencement of her literary career. Turner's writing during this period was prolific. Apart from the three books written whilst living at Inglewood - Seven Little Australians (1893), The Family at Misrule (1894) and The Story of a Baby (1894), she also wrote many stories and articles that were published in the Illustrated Sydney News, The Parthenon, Tasmanian Mail, The Bulletin, Daily Telegraph and Town and Country Journal.

Turner and her family worshipped at St. John's Church at Gordon, she was married in that church, and local identities referred to in her diary included the Pockley family at Killara.

The subsequent ownership of Inglewod by Andrew J. Sievers (1895) marked a new chapter in the history of the property with significant changes to both the exterior and interior. During Sievers' ownership the Victorian Georgian style house, a classic Georgian-styled two-storey villa with attic was remodelled and extended in the then more contemporary Federation Filigree style. It is likely that the house was renamed "Woodlands" during this period. Sievers returned from his tenure in Europe as Acting Consul to the Royal Swedish and Norwegian Consulate (1887) with significant ideas that added innovations to his home. Sievers' died in 1916 with ownership passing to Agnes Parkinson. Agnes Parkinson in turn sold the property after six years to John Waugh, a bachelor, for the sum of five thousand one hundred pounds. John Waugh died in 1945.

Following Waugh's death, Eric B. Mills is understood to have purchased Woodlands in 1946. The property acquired by Eric Mills extended from the present day Kiamala Crescent on the north to Treatts Road on the south and encompassed the formal entry to the property from Treatts Road. The lands formerly associated with Woodlands to its north and east were subdivided and offered for auction under the title of the "Waugh Estate" on 27 November 1948. The auction by Hardie and Gorman Pty Ltd was the first on-site auction of vacant lots of land following World War II in New South Wales. The auction drew large crowds as restrictions on the sale of vacant lots in the wake of World War II had been lifted on 20 September 1948.

On 14 October 1948, the land presently forming the eastern boundary of Woodlands was added to the property as compensation for land resumed by Ku-ring-gai Council on the northern boundary, to allow for the extension of Kiamala Crescent to Werona Avenue. This parcel of land had previously formed a small part of the original estate. The Mills family later subdivided Woodlands on 24 September 1952, and sold the southern lot fronting Treatts Road. The subsequent construction of a red brick house on this lot resulted in the loss of formal gardens and the alienation of Woodlands from Treatts Road. As a consequence the street address of "Woodlands" changed to that of the adjoining suburb of Killara. Mature palm trees still mark the former entry to Woodlands on Treatts Road.

The house and remnant grounds of Woodlands (Ingelwood) have remained in the ownership of the Mills family and at the time of preparing this information (2006), William J. Mills was the listed owner. Mrs Patricia Mills the wife of Eric B. Mills had an interest in Ethel Turner and wrote an article about her in "Descent" the genealogical magazine in 1967.

=== Ethel Turner (1870–1958) ===
Ethel Turner was born on 24 January 1870 at Balby, Yorkshire England, second child of Bennett George Burwell (d. 1872), a commercial traveller and his wife Sarah Jane (née Shaw). Burwell died in Paris during Ethel's infancy. In 1872 Ethel's widowed mother Sarah Jane Burwell married Henry Turner, a widower with six children. They were to have a daughter Jeannie Rose (b.1873). Ethel and her older sister Lilian Wattnall Burwell (1867-1956) took their step father's name and were known by it throughout their professional careers. Turner, a factory manager, fell into financial difficulties and left only 200 pounds when he died at Coventry in August 1878.

In 1879 the twice widowed Mrs Turner migrated to NSW with her three daughters, Ethel, Lilian and Rose. Also in her care were her step daughter Lucy Turner and another child known as Annie. On 31 December 1880, Sarah Turner married Charles Cope, a clerk of the NSW Lands Department. The following year, Charles and Sarah had a son, Rex (b. 1881). At this time they lived at Woollahra, moving to Paddington in 1885 remaining there until 1890. Turner's autobiographical novel "Three Little Maids" (1900) describes her mother's struggle to maintain her family in genteel poverty and presents the third marriage to Charles Cope as a means of rescue.

Ethel and her older sister Lilian Turner, who would also become an author, attended Sydney Girls High School. Their literary careers began with the magazine they established at school called the Iris.

In 1889 following her graduation from school, Ethel and Lilian founded and co-edited a literary magazine, entitled The Parthenon. The Parthenon consisted of romantic fiction, serial stories, essays, poems, household hints, reviews and letters. By Turner's admission, many of the contributions were contributed by herself and Lilian under various pseudonyms, with the children's page largely being Ethel's responsibility. The Parthenon which lasted for three years sold about 1,500 copies per month and made £50 annually for its editors.

The Parthenon had already been in circulation for two years when the Cope family moved to Lindfield in September 1891. Ethel Turner's diaries likened the move to the house in Lindfield (now Killara) to "being buried alive to live in a quiet little country place after the bustle and excitement of town life." The lapse of The Parthenon, and Ethel's subsequent contribution to the Illustrated Sydney News in the form of the children's page prepared Ethel for what she referred to as her "grand work". The move to Lindfield served to provide her with the inspiration for this undertaking.

On 24 January 1893, the day of her birthday, Ethel Turner began writing Seven Little Australians. Nine months later in October Turner wrote "Finished 7 Little Australians, hurrah. Now I only have to copy out 7 chapters and it is ready to go and hunt for a publisher." The writing of Seven Little Australians was completed while sitting in a low hanging branch of an apple tree in the orchard within the grounds of "Inglewood". At other times she wrote inside the house both in the drawing room and the bedroom that she shared with Lilian.

Seven Little Australians was a watershed in Australian children's literature due to its depiction of an Australian rather than British family. The conflict and melodramatic aspects within the family life of the fictional Woolcott's have ensured the universal longevity which has made it popular worldwide.

Following the publication of Seven Little Australians, Turner wrote The Family at Misrule" in 1894 and The Story of a Baby in the same year. In December 1894, the Cope family moved to a house they had built in Powell Street, Killara called Bukyangi. By 1896 a further three books were written and published by Turner – The Little Duchess, The Little Larrikin and Miss Bobbie. In April of this same year she married Herbert Raine Curlewis (1869–1942), Barrister at Law, and later Judge of the Industrial Arbitration Court (1917) and the District Court (1928).

Ethel and Herbert Curlewis moved to a rented cottage at Mosman while building their own house Avenel which overlooked Middle Harbour. This house, Avenel was where Ethel lived for the rest of her life. From 1897 until 1928 Turner wrote and published a further thirty six books. She also became Editor of Sunbeams a weekend coloured comic supplement of the Sydney Sun until 1931. At the peak of her editorship, Turner who called herself Chief Sunbeamer received four thousand letters in one week. It was also during her editorship that Turner encouraged the creation of the iconic comic strip character Ginger Meggs.

Ethel and Herbert Curlewis had two children, Ethel Jean Sophia (1898–1930) and Adrian Herbert (1901–1985). Jean Charlton (née Curlewis) who was also an author died of tuberculosis in March 1930, Ethel was said to be so affected by her daughter's untimely death that she did not write another book.

Ethel Turner's son Sir Adrian Herbert Curlewis (1901–1985), was a Judge, surf life-saver and administrator. He graduated from Sydney University and was called to the Bar in 1927. He served in Malaya in World War II and was a prisoner of war from 1942 to 1945. He was a New South Wales District Court Judge from 1948 to 1971, retiring at the age of 70. He was also President of the Surf Life Saving Association of Australia from 1933 to 1974, and President of the International Council of Surf Life Saving from 1956 to 1973.

Ethel Turner died at Mosman on 8 April 1958, in her eighty eighth year. She was buried in the Anglican section of the Northern Suburbs cemetery. Extracts from her diaries were compiled and published by her grand daughter Philippa Poole in 1979.

Of the four houses in which Turner completed her writing, Woodlands is only one of the two houses, with Yanalla, that still remain. Ethel and Herbert also lived at Neuk in Mosman and Avenel but these two properties have since been demolished.

=== Comparison to Grandview ===
Woodlands (prior to its Federation style modifications) displayed many similarities to the c.1880 "Grandview" located on the Pacific Highway at Pymble.

== Description ==
Woodlands (formerly known as Inglewood, Inglenook) is situated on approximately 2,113-square-metre (22,740 sq ft) corner block (formed of 2 lots) bound by Kiamala Crescent to the north and Werona Avenue to the west. The house occupies a central position on the site with evidence of the original tennis court adjacent to the western side of the house. The original entrance (Treatts Road) is marked by two palm trees, subdivision of the property has altered the original front (southern) boundary.

In its original form (c. 1880) the house was a two-storey square brick building reminiscent of the Victorian Georgian style ('a classic Georgian-styled two-storey villa with attic'. The bricks were coated with stucco and marked to give the appearance of ashlar masonry. A paint scrape on one of the external walls suggests that the original stuccoed brickwork was painted a pale red colour. The family that has owned the property since 1946 has advised that the masonry was painted a grey colour when they first purchased it.

It was originally approached from what was Treatt's Road, Lindfield. The later subdivision of the property to the south fronting Treatt's Road has had a negative impact on the aesthetic attributes and landmark qualities of Woodlands. The carriage loop was originally accessed with a driveway from Treatts Road as evidenced by two Canary Island palm trees (Phoenix canariensis) on the road which once flanked this driveway entry.

In its present form Woodlands retains the original footprint of the Victorian house with extensive renovations to the external facade of the property and some modifications to the exterior in the Federation Filigree style. The Federation Filigree overlay is evident in the timber verandahs extending along the full length of the western side and approximately one third of the eastern perimeter. Midway on the eastern wall is a timber and glass addition which houses the sunroom. Central to the front of the house is a two-storey bay with gable roof, flanked either side by a timber verandah. French doors on both upper and lower storeys are symmetrically aligned to the right and left of the front door. Each French door has adjoining timber shutters. The external brick walls are rendered and painted white. The roof is made of slate tile.

Entry into Woodlands is reached by an ascending series of sandstone steps flanked by sandstone step walls. The panelled front door is inset with a stained glass bird motif within a leadlight frame. Australian fauna motifs are repeated throughout - on the interior door leading to the rear of the house, and in a grand stained glass window above the cedar staircase.

The garden retains much of its early layout and fabric, with mature trees including the relatively rare Queensland lacebark (Brachychiton discolor), Illawarra flame (B.acerifolium) and two mature eucalypts (likely to be Sydney blue gum, E.saligna) on the nature strip / (Werona Avenue) street providing and retaining a sympathetic "bushland" or "rural" setting. The tennis court formerly west of the house has been removed, although evidence of it remains. The existing half carriage loop with its central planting in front (south) of the house may be original features. These are now accessed from Werona Avenue. Access in Ethel Turner's time would have been from Treatts Road which is now subdivided off to form a separate allotment. The rear garden facing Kiamala Crescent was subdivided off in the 1950s (part of it in the 1940s). A mature cocks-comb coral tree (Erythrina christa-galli), some eucalypts and a wooden paling fence face this rear address. Another tennis court was made in the north-east of the house in the 1950s when Kiamala Crescent and Werona Avenue works necessitated removal of the earlier court.

=== Condition ===
The property is substantially intact with original brickwork dating back to the 1880s. Subsequent renovations carried out in the early twentieth century include stained glass windows, timber work and fireplaces all of which remain in good condition.

During the time in which Andrew J. Sievers was owner, he installed "an unusual luxury, a hot water system to serve bathroom, laundry and kitchen". This was an innovation which Sievers' brought with him following his return from Europe where he was Acting Consul to the Royal Swedish and Norwegian Consulate

The integrity of Woodlands (formerly known as Inglewood) in terms of its association with the author, Ethel Turner is significant. The Drawing Room and Bedroom where she undertook her writing remain intact. Furthermore, the original footprint of the house remains intact despite the external and internal additions. There is evidence of the original ashlar masonry finish below the verandah which gives a partial view of the external appearance of the property as it was during Ethel Turner's tenure. In terms of its appearance as a Federation property renovated by Sievers, the house is substantially intact despite various subdivisions that have been made to its boundaries throughout its history.

=== Modifications and dates ===
1884–1894

During the period when Ethel Turner was a resident of Woodlands, the dwelling was a square house with a long balcony and a painted striped bullnose verandah roof. Ethel Turner describes the interior of the house in The Diaries of Ethel Turner "the Drawing Room is on the left hand side, a nice long room with four windows and pale blue walls. On the right hand side was the Dining room - rather small, with a small room attached. Upstairs were four bedrooms, downstairs kitchen, servant's rooms and various outhouses.' According to plans completed for the Sievers' renovation, the layout of the house is as described by Ethel in her diary:

- Drawing Room being 7.0 by 4.2 metres (23 ft × 13.9 ft)
- Dining Room being 7.0 by 4.3 metres (23 ft × 14 ft) on the ground floor level.
- Bedroom 1 being 4.3 by 4.0 metres (14 ft × 13 ft) at the front of the house, on the upper level
- Bedroom 2 being 5.2 by 4.3 metres (17 ft × 14 ft)
- Bedroom 3 being 6.1 by 4.0 metres (20 ft × 13 ft)
- Bedroom 4 being 4.9 by 4.3 metres (16 ft × 14 ft).

Evidence suggests that the kitchen and servants quarters were contained within a lean-to style timber building.

1895

Ownership of the house passed to Andrew Johnstone Sievers in 1895 and subsequent renovations gave the property its current appearance of a distinctly Federation Filigree style property. Cast iron decorations were replaced by turned timber verandah posts, a timber balcony around the perimeter of the building, and a new central two storey front bay with gable roof. Evidence of the attachments of original cast iron frieze and fringe are evident on the lower front wall. On the eastern wall, the base of the verandah has been built over the original ashlar masonry wall, thereby protecting the original colour, a pale red, which can be viewed through a series of shallow arches.

Significant alterations were made to the size of the property. Sievers made additions which consisted of a laundry and kitchen and enclosed the verandah to the rear lower portion of the property. A bathroom and additional bedrooms were added to the upstairs level. Sievers also moved the cedar staircase from the front to the back of the hall.

- 1921 Ku-ring-gai valuation cards stated that the house had 6 rooms and an office, with a slate roof, stables and shed.
- 1946 acquired by Eric Mills - the property extended from the present day Kiamala Crescent on the north to Treatts Road on the south and encompassed the formal entry to the property from Treatts Road.
- 1948 The lands formerly associated with Woodlands to its north and east were subdivided and offered for auction under the title of the "Waugh Estate" on 27 November 1948.
- 1952 Subdivision of "Woodlands" and sale of the land fronting Treatts Road, Lindfield. The land subdivided and sold is the present Lot 1 DP 91685.

=== Further information ===
Listed on the Local Environment Plan for Ku-ring-gai.

== Heritage listing ==
As at 13 July 2006, the c. 1884 Woodlands (formerly known as Inglewood) is of State heritage significance for its historic association with the acclaimed Australian children's author Ethel Turner (1870–1958) whose most famous literary work Seven Little Australians was written during Turner's occupancy of the property.

Ethel Turner lived at Woodlands with her family from September 1891 to December 1894. During this period she wrote three books: her first and most famous children's novel 'Seven Little Australians'; its sequel The Family at Misrule; and The Story of a Baby. Seven Little Australians and its sequel were strongly influenced by the social and domestic environment of Woodlands and its natural surroundings creating a provocative portrayal of children and Australian identity in the late 19th century.

Seven Little Australians has been in print for well over 100 years. It has sold over several million copies in the English language. It has been translated into at least 13 languages, performed as a stage play and been made into a film, a BBC television series in 1953, a 10 episode television series for the ABC in 1973 and a musical in 1988.

Woodlands is one of the earlier substantial Ku-ring-gai residences pre-dating the Hornsby to St Leonards railway line which opened in 1890. The two storey late Victorian Georgian style house demonstrates many aspects of the Federation Filigree style having been remodelled during the Federation period. It provides a rare example of the layering of the Victorian and Federation era styles in domestic architecture.

Woodlands was listed on the New South Wales State Heritage Register on 13 October 2006 having satisfied the following criteria.

The place is important in demonstrating the course, or pattern, of cultural or natural history in New South Wales.

Woodlands (formerly known as Inglewood) is of Local heritage significance as one of the oldest surviving examples of architecture in the Lindfield/Killara area. It is an excellent surviving example of pre-railway settlement within the Ku-ring-gai municipality. The significance of the property is derived from it being one of few examples of a large residence in Ku-ring-gai, occupied by a businessman (Edward Allyn Braham, merchant), prior to the coming of the railway. The advent of the railway attracted many businessmen to the Ku-ring-gai municipality with the promise of a healthy new lifestyle, 'clear of air and free from the pollution from an inadequate Sydney sewerage system.'

The place has a strong or special association with a person, or group of persons, of importance of cultural or natural history of New South Wales's history.

State Significance: Woodlands (formerly known as Inglewood) is of State and local heritage significance for its association with the acclaimed Australian children's author Ethel Turner (1870–1958) whose most famous literary work Seven Little Australians was written during Turner's occupancy of the property.

Ethel Turner lived at Inglewood with her family from September 1894 to December 1896. During this period she wrote three books: her first and most famous children's novel 'Seven Little Australians'; its sequel The Family at Misrule; and The Story of a Baby.

Seven Little Australians has been in print for over 100 years. It has sold over two million copies in the English language. It has been translated into at least 11 languages, performed as a stage play, and been made into a film, a BBC television series in 1953, and a 10 episode television series for the ABC in 1973.

The novel and its sequel were strongly influenced by the social and domestic environment of Woodlands and its natural surroundings to create a provocative portrayal of children in late 19th century Australia.

Ethel Turner published 42 books during her lifetime. Of the four houses occupied by Ethel Turner during her writing career (1894–1928), only "Woodlands" remains. Although there have been changes to the house both externally and internally, the Drawing Room and the bedroom where Turner wrote her most famous book remain.

The place is important in demonstrating aesthetic characteristics and/or a high degree of creative or technical achievement in New South Wales.

Woodlands (formerly known as Inglewood) is aesthetically distinctive and has landmark qualities at the Local level. Although altered from its original fabric, it continues to represent a good example of Federation architecture and fittings. The interior of the property boasts a stained glass window on the rear wall which provides a magnificent backdrop to the hall and cedar staircase.

Gardens surrounding the property of Woodlands evoke a past synonymous with nineteenth century gardens as described in Ethel Turner's literature. The property occupies a landmark position high on the ridges of the Hornsby plateau within the Ku-ring-gai municipality.

The place has a strong or special association with a particular community or cultural group in New South Wales for social, cultural or spiritual reasons.

Local Significance: Ethel Turner is widely known as Australia's most significant children's author. The NSW Premier's Literary Awards have included an Ethel Turner Prize for young people's literature since 1979. Ethel Turner is also commemorated by a plaque on Writer's Walk on Sydney's foreshore. In the suburb of Lindfield, the local bushland reserve is called "Seven Little Australians" Park in commemoration of her most famous book. In addition the library of Lindfield Public School is named the Ethel Turner Library in her honour.

'Seven Little Australians' is the only Australian children's book to have remained continuously in print since its first publication in 1894. Its translation in 1895 marked it as the first Australian children's publication to have received payment in foreign currency. There have been over forty different editions in ten languages, and its story has been told in the form of stage plays and films. The television serial titled "Seven Little Australians" made in 1973 continues to be shown on television as recently as 2005.

The place has potential to yield information that will contribute to an understanding of the cultural or natural history of New South Wales.

Local Significance: The underground water tank which supplied the bathroom, laundry and kitchen with hot running water is of local heritage technical significance and merits full investigation and further research. It is situated on the eastern side of the property approximately two metres from the enclosed verandah.

The site is likely to yield technological and archaeological relics.

The place possesses uncommon, rare or endangered aspects of the cultural or natural history of New South Wales.

Local Significance: "Woodlands" (formerly known as 'Inglewood') is a locally rare example of pre-railway settlement in the Ku-ring-gai locality.

Written evidence states that A. J. Sievers installed an underground water system to supply the bathroom, laundry and kitchen with hot running water which may be a rare surviving example of this technology. Further investigation is required to determine the extent of its importance.

The place is important in demonstrating the principal characteristics of a class of cultural or natural places/environments in New South Wales.

Local Significance: Woodlands (formerly known as Inglewood) is locally significant as an example of the substantial residential properties which pre-dated the development of the railway and the suburb of Lindfield/Killara. In addition it demonstrates a layering of the Federation architectural style over a mid Victorian building that in its original presentation was not dissimilar to the c.1880 "Grandview" at Pymble.

== See also ==
- Australian residential architectural styles
- Media related to Woodlands, Killara at Wikimedia Commons
