= David Reeves (composer) =

Australian composer, conductor, and organist

David Reeves OAM (born 1943) is an Australian composer, conductor and organist. He began his professional career as a concert organist in the early 1960s, turning to conducting and composition some ten years later. He is the composer of original modern music that bridges commercial and classical styles. 'An original Australian Musical Trailblazer' - Tommy Tycho OBE AM - Channel 9 - Star-Sound Recording Studios 1992 (Interview - Rod Henshaw Radio 4BC).

== Education and career ==
Reeves was born in Sydney and educated at Shore School, where his musical promise was recognised early by George Faunce Allman who, with his wife Dora, taught him piano and organ as well as placing him in the choir of St James' Church, Sydney, as a chorister.

Reeves' first organ appointment was as organist for Sydney Hospital Chapel, followed by his first professional engagement as Director of Music at the Garrison Church, Miller's Point, both while he was still at school.

Reeves studied at the Sydney Conservatorium of Music under Alexander Sverjensky (piano), George Faunce Allman (organ) and Norman Johnston (organ). He was awarded both of the overseas music scholarships available in the early sixties: the Alice Bryant Memorial Scholarship for Organists and the Sydney Organ Society Scholarship for Overseas Study. In 1962, Reeves was appointed accompanist to the Sydney University Graduate Choir. During the 1960s, English organ builders J. W. Walker & Sons expanded into Australia, and in 1963 they appointed Reeves as their recitalist, leading to the opening recitals of many new and rebuilt organs throughout Australia.

Whilst at the Sydney Conservatorium, Reeves performed as jazz pianist in addition to his organ performances (including Quo Vadis in Martin Place). He taught briefly at the Presbyterian Ladies' College in Croydon before being appointed by Betty Archdale to the music staff of Abbotsleigh school, where he later became Director of Music. By the end of the decade he had left Abbotsleigh to open his own music school, Bainbridge Reeves Academy of Music, which became well known on Sydney's North Shore. During this time, he also adjudicated for Channel Nine TV in Sydney with Terry Dear's New Faces Talent Programmes.

== Works as performer ==
Reeves has performed as an organ recitalist in all the main venues in Australia, including ABC radio broadcasts from the Sydney Town Hall. He was especially sought after for his improvisations which concluded nearly all his recitals, as well as becoming a feature of his liturgical performances, as demonstrated through his many recordings.

From 1963 to 1978, Reeves accompanied the very popular annual Combined Churches' presentations of Handel's Messiah conducted by Richard Thew. The choir grew to some eight hundred voices and these performances filled the Sydney Town Hall for three nights each year. They were a highlight of the Sydney Christmas calendar in the sixties and seventies.

Reeves became particularly identified with the famous "Hill" organ in the Sydney Town Hall, where he worked extensively from 1963 to 1976 as recitalist. He also performed at Civic Receptions, School Speech Days, presentation evenings and State occasions, including the presentation of Commercial Advertising Awards. He performed with a number of choirs and choral ensembles, including the Oriana Singers under the direction of Norman Johnston.

Reeves has been an advocate for music as an “international language” that transcends cultural and social boundaries. He has promoted music education among young people through workshops and seminars, and served as a visiting Australian composer at Gordonstoun School in Scotland. He also founded the Australian “Operation Young Composer” Award programme, which has provided opportunities for several young Australian composers to pursue overseas study.

Reeves has adjudicated numerous Eisteddfods, including the City of Sydney, Parramatta, Gunnedah and Tamworth Eisteddfods. He has given of his time to a number of schools and individuals in the interests of the "musical journey" he loves, including through music camps for performance and composition. Between 1977 and 1982, his schedule included two busy contracts with TAS in country NSW, a prolific period during which he composed the scores for at least one musical each year, musically directing the performances as well as practising music teaching techniques (including choral training) developed from his own performance and composition.

== Works as composer ==
David Reeves has composed music for theatre, stage, concert hall and church, warming particularly to vocal textures in the Cathedral and large Choral traditions, as well as theatrical/jazz styles. The musical spirit in his organ and piano (jazz) performances as a young performer infiltrated into nearly all his compositions as a mature composer.

His works includes opera, oratorio, musicals, orchestral and chamber compositions, as well as commercial music composed electronically. Reeves' work has been seen and heard on stage and in churches, concert halls and festivals. His style is theatrical and filmic, symphonic and homogenous, employing lyrical and linear melodic phrasing with a tendency towards rich orchestration. His approach to the human voice is similar, reaching out to the full range and tones of the artists and choirs for which he writes. He leans toward the classical and romantic but writes in contemporary styles influenced by Broadway.

Reeves has been described as "one of the most brilliant and unique artistic creative forces to originate from Australia" (Meridian Television 2000), through works including the chamber opera Dorian, the Oratorio Becket – The Kiss of Peace, and the musical Seven Little Australians, the very first major home-grown musical box-office success in Australia's theatrical history.

From the early 1970s Reeves has been awarded many creative contracts, including the Hanna Barbera Christmas film Silent Night, the musical recording Pilgrimage, a commercial album celebrating the musical highlights of the first Papal Tour of Australia, a music and poetry album featuring the voice and poetry of Sydney radio personality John Laws.

In 1987 the Australian Bicentennial Authority appointed Reeves as composer for the soundtrack to the promotional film for the "Tall Ships" celebration to take place on Sydney Harbour in 1988. Also in that year, his theatre musical Seven Little Australians, based on the classic Australian story originally created by Ethel Turner, opened at the Comedy Theatre in Melbourne. The musical was to run for more than 500 performances in the main theatres throughout the eastern states. The Royal Queensland Theatre Company produced a sellout season in 1991. The amateur rights are now regularly taken up and many musical societies have performed the piece in recent years. David Reeves' production quickly became the biggest box office success ever in this country for a fully homegrown original stage musical production with music, lyrics and book all created by Australians.

Reeves' opera Cyrano de Bergerac followed in 1992.

By now completely based in London, Reeves scored Oscar Wilde's The Picture of Dorian Gray, which was performed on the West End. The treatment of the text was extremely controversial, which was reflected in several negative critiques in 1997.

In 1999 Reeves returned to more conventional texts and recorded his oratorio Becket – The Kiss of Peace. A subsequent performance of this work became the highlight of the Canterbury Festival in 2000, given under the auspices of Prince Charles to raise funds for the Prince's Trust. That performance featured the choristers of Canterbury Cathedral with the English Chamber Singers, the English Festival Orchestra and soloists including James Bowman, Gillian Keith and David Wilson-Johnson.

In 2002 Reeves composed his oratorio Planet Requiem, which was commissioned by Assisi's 'Festival of Peace'.

2018 saw Reeves' 'STAGE DOOR' SONGBOOK SERIES titled 'SONGS FROM AUSTRALIAN MUSICALS' published by Origin Theatrical with international distribution through Hal Leonard Music. A work highlighting theatrical music and lyric material originating from Australia. The SYDNEY ORGAN JOURNAL interview was published in 2019 in an article titled 'EXPANDED HORIZONS'.

Reeves' new musical, 'EVER THE BEST OF FRIENDS', a cross between opera and musical completed a workshop at the SYDNEY CONSERVATORIUM OF MUSIC in February 2020.

== Awards and nominations ==
Reeves was presented with the Variety Club Award for Service to the Arts in 1995.

In the 2019 Queen's Birthday Honours Reeves was awarded the Medal of the Order of Australia (OAM) for his "service to the performing arts, particularly through music composition".

=== ARIA Music Awards ===
The ARIA Music Awards is an annual awards ceremony that recognises excellence, innovation, and achievement across all genres of Australian music. They commenced in 1987.

| Year | Nominee / work | Award | Result | Ref. |
|---|---|---|---|---|
| 1989 | Seven Little Australians | Best Original Soundtrack, Cast or Show Album | Nominated | |

== Major works ==
- 'Tuba I-IV-V' (for organ) – 1966 Publisher DRM [ APRA | AMCOS ]
- 'Instrumental Pops" – 1968 Publisher Anglo Continental Publishing
- Ballet – 1970 – Publisher DRM [APRA/AMCOS] (composed for ABC Television)
- 'Silent Night'– Incidental Music 1973 Publisher Hanna-Barbera (composed for film 'Silent Night' commission Hanna-Barbera)
- 'Musical Colours' 1976 – Publisher DRM [APRA/AMCOS] (commissioned for Crippled Children Concert Sydney Town Hall 1977)
- 'The Lord's my Shepherd' 1977 – Publisher DRM [APRA/AMCOS] (Cantata for choir and organ)
- 'Tall Ships' score 1977 – Publisher DRM [APRA/AMCOS] (commission Australian Bicentennial Authority)
- 'A People's Mass' – 1980 – Publisher DRM [APRA/AMCOS] (An approachable 'Folk Mass' for general performance)
- 'Piano Quintet' – 1982 – Publisher DRM [APRA/AMCOS] (Tone poem based on Australian outback)
- 'Organ Sonata' – 1985 – Publisher DRM [APRA/AMCOS] (first performed 1986 by the composer 'Great Hall' – Sydney University)
- 'Organ Fantasia' 1986 – Publisher DRM [APRA/AMCOS] (first performed by the composer 'Sydney Opera House' – 1987)
- 'This Australian Christmas' 2009 – (Works for choir and organ) Three Australian Christmas Carols – Publisher DRM [APRA/AMCOS]
- 'Seven Little Australians' – (Musical premiered 1988 – Premiered Comedy Theatre Melbourne – Publisher DRM [APRA/AMCOS]
- 'Favorite Son' – (Reeves/Stapleton 1990 – Musical premiered 1990 Melbourne Australia – Publisher DRM [APRA/AMCOS]
- 'James and Maggie' 1991 – Musical Reeves/Yeldham – based on the J C Williamson theatre years)
- 'Cyrano de Bergerac' – 1991–92 – (Opera premiered Brisbane Queensland Australia1992- first recorded EMI)
- 'Cyrano' – 1994 – (Musical album recorded Prestige Records – London UK)
- 'Dorian' – 1997 – (Opera premiered – Arts Theatre London −1997) Publisher DRM [APRA/AMCOS]
- 'Becket – The Kiss of Peace' – 1999 (Oratorio premiered Canterbury Festival, Canterbury 2000 – score recorded CTS London 1999 and 'live' at Canterbury Cathedral 2000) – Publisher DRM [APRA/AMCOS]
- 'Planet Requiem' – 2002 – (Oratorio commissioned Assisi Festival for Peace, Assisi Italy 2002) Publisher DRM [APRA/AMCOS]
- 'Grand Central' 2006 – (Musical Work in Progress- first try-out Civic Theatre Newcastle, NSW Australia)
- 'Vox' – 2009 (Musical – An original story of Americans returned from combat in Iraq) Publisher DRM [APRA/AMCOS]
- 'Hey! Hey! – [The Adventures of Tom Sawyer] – 1980–2013 (Young people's musical set to Mark Twain's theatrical text) Publisher DRM [APRA/AMCOS]

== Major recordings ==
- 'Tuba I-IV-V' (for organ) – 1966 (recorded by the composer 'Organ Album – St John's Launceston 1977 and 'Peace and Love' EP – Canterbury Cathedral 2001) DRM [APRA/AMCOS] (P) English Gramophone International
- 'Instrumental Pops" – 1968 Anglo Continental Publishing (P) Instrumental Pops Orchestra – Hamburg 1968)
- 'Musical Colours' 1976 – DRM [APRA/AMCOS] (P) Bodemo Pty Ltd ('Crippled Children' Album – Sydney Town Hall)
- 'The Lord's my Shepherd' (Cantata) 1977 – DRM [APRA/AMCOS] (P) Bodemo Pty Ltd
- 'Tall Ships' score 1977 – DRM [APRA/AMCOS] (P) Showproms EG (commission Australian Bicentennial Authority)
- 'Organ Sonata' – 1985 – DRM [APRA/AMCOS] (P) English Gramophone Showproms (recorded 1986 by the composer 'Great Hall' – Sydney University)
- 'Seven Little Australians' – 1988 – (Musical premiered 1988) (recording – Castle Communications Pty Ltd (P) EMI) (recording – DRM [APRA/AMCOS] (P) Showproms – English Gramophone)
- 'Seven Little Australians' – 1988 [EP] – Julie Anthony Castle Communications Pty Ltd (P) EMI
- 'Cyrano de Bergerac' – 1991–92 – (Opera premiered Brisbane Queensland Australia1992- first recorded EMI) DRM [APRA/AMCOS] (P) English Gramophone – Showproms)
- 'Cyrano' – Reeves/Shaper – 1994 St James (P) Prestige London
- 'Becket – The Kiss of Peace' – 1999 – DRM [APRA/AMCOS] (P) English Gramophone [Jersey ] (recorded CTS Studios Wembley Middlesex UK
- 'Becket – The Kiss of Peace' – 2000 – DRM [APRA/AMCOS] (P) English Gramophone Showproms – (Oratorio premiered Canterbury Festival, Canterbury 2000 – first recorded CTS London and 'live' at Canterbury Cathedral 2000)
- 'Peace and Love' – from Canterbury Cathedral – 2002 [EP] DRM [APRA/AMCOS] (P) English Gramophone

=== Major Recordings by Reeves as Producer ===
- 'Pilgrimage' – 1970 DRM [APRA/AMCOS] (P) Grenfel David Reeves Productions P/L
- 'In Love is an Expensive Place to Die' – 1971 DRM [APRA/AMCOS] (P) Ultimat ULP 2002
- 'Seven Little Australians Musical And Original Tour' - 1988-89

=== Major Recordings by Reeves as Organist ===
- David Reeves at the Grand Organ, Sydney Town Hall – 1971 DRM [APRA/AMCOS] (P) Unison AAVR
- David Reeves in the Church of St Gabriel, Reservoir, Victoria Australia DRM [APRA] (P) Bodemo Records
- SING MESSIAH 800 Voices – Combined Church Choirs – Richard Thew – David Reeves 1963–1972 – Sydney Town Hall DRM [APRA/AMCOS] (P) EG Jersey
- David Reeves Organ Virtuoso – St John's Church, Launceston, Tasmania – 1977 DRM [APRA] (P) Bodemo Records
- David Reeves The Crippled Children's Album – Sydney Town Hall −1979 DRM [APRA/AMCOS] (P) Bodemo Records
