= The Duke of Edinburgh's Award =

Youth awards programme founded in the United Kingdom

- Awarded for: Completing a range of challenging activities across five sections: volunteering, physical recreation, skills, expedition, and a residential.
- Date: 13 October 1956; 70 years ago
- Location: 9 Greyfriars Road; Reading, Berkshire RG11 NU
- Country: Commonwealth (including the United Kingdom, Canada, Australia, and New Zealand)
- Rewards: Bronze, Silver, or Gold
- Patron: Prince Edward, Duke of Edinburgh
- Website: dofe.org

The Duke of Edinburgh's Award (commonly abbreviated DofE) is a youth awards programme founded in the United Kingdom in 1956 by Prince Philip, Duke of Edinburgh, which has since expanded to 144 nations. The awards recognise adolescents and young adults for completing a series of self-improvement exercises modelled on Kurt Hahn's solutions to his "Six Declines of Modern Youth".

== History ==
In February 1955, The Duke of Edinburgh's Award was first announced. It was at first "for boys aged 15 to 18". It was first administered, and largely designed, by John Hunt, who had led the first successful ascent of Mount Everest in 1953, and who retired from the army in 1956 to become the first Director of the Duke of Edinburgh's Award.

It was designed to attract boys who had not been interested in joining one of the main British youth movements, such as the Scout Association. In the first twelve months, 7,000 boys enrolled for the scheme. The programme borrowed from the Moray Badge, instituted at Gordonstoun School by its headmaster, Kurt Hahn, in 1936, and the County Badge adopted in Moray in 1941.

In November 1957, it was announced that girls would be invited to participate. On 19 June 1958, the programme was extended to girls, with the first allowed to join from 1 September 1958. The programme for girls was not the same as that for boys, and was for ages 14 to 20. The first Gold Awards were achieved in 1958, and the charity was established in 1959. The first girls received their Gold Awards on 3 November 1959, at a ceremony at Buckingham Palace.

From January 1965, the Gold Award schemes for boys and girls were made more like each other. A single programme for young people aged 14 to 21 was launched in 1969, and in 1980 it was extended to those up to 25 years of age. In 2013, the Duke presented Awards at St James's Palace, one of which was his 500th Gold Award Presentation.

== United Kingdom ==
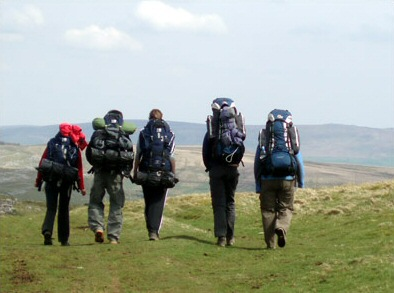
A Duke of Edinburgh group on their expedition in 2008.

The first Duke of Edinburgh's Award ceremony was held in the United Kingdom in 1956. Participation in DofE programmes and the number of awards achieved has grown every year since 1956. Young people take part in Duke of Edinburgh's Award programmes run in designated DofE centres – including schools, youth clubs, Air cadets, Army Cadets and businesses – throughout the country. Over 6 million people have taken part in the DofE since 1956 (8 million worldwide). The Duke of Edinburgh's Award is a member of the National Council for Voluntary Youth Services (NCVYS). In 2009, the old system of keeping track of progress through paper Record Books was replaced by the introduction of a major new online system – eDofE. Participants use this system to track their progress, while Leaders use it to oversee participants' progress.

=== Award programmes ===
The Duke of Edinburgh's Award programmes take between one and four years to complete, and they must be completed by the participant's 25th-birthday. The programmes are at three progressive levels which, if successfully completed, lead to a Bronze, Silver, or Gold Duke of Edinburgh's Award. With assistance from adult Leaders, participants select and set objectives in each of the following areas:

- Volunteering: undertaking service to individuals or the community.
- Physical: improving in an area of sport, dance or fitness activities.
- Skills: developing practical and social skills and personal interests.
- Expedition: planning, training for, and completion of an adventurous journey nationally or abroad.
- At Gold level, participants must do an additional fifth Residential section, which involves staying and working away from home for five days, doing a shared activity.

To achieve an award, the participant must work on each section for a minimum period of time, and must be monitored and assessed by someone with knowledge of the chosen activities. Each progressive level demands more time and commitment from participants: Bronze 3–6 months; Silver: 6–9 months; Gold: 12–18 months. Participants are required to show regular activity and commitment to the award for the duration of their DofE programme, which is usually at least one hour per week.

=== Joint Award Initiative ===
In Northern Ireland, participants completing the Duke of Edinburgh's Award can choose to accept a certificate from the Gaisce or an International Award Certificate instead of a Duke of Edinburgh certificate.

== Other nations ==
Awards modelled on The Duke of Edinburgh's Award are presented by sponsoring organisations affiliated with the Duke of Edinburgh's International Award Association in 144 nations: 29 located in the Americas; 36 in Africa; 32 in Asian Pacific countries; and 47 in Europe, around the Mediterranean, and in Arab countries. The prestige, scope and awareness of these awards vary from country to country and often – unlike awards programmes in Ireland and the United Kingdom – there is no connection to the head of state and awards are simply issued by private youth charities. In the United States, for instance, only about 7,000 of the estimated 47 million eligible persons age 14 to 24 annually participate in the programme.

=== Australia ===
The Award was established in Australia in 1959 on the initiative of Sir Adrian Curlewis (son of Herbert Curlewis) in 1958. By 1962 the award was available in all state and territories and today over 30,000 young Australians commence a Bronze, Silver or Gold Award each year. The Duke of Ed in Australia is a widely recognised organising and accrediting framework of non-formal education and learning. Over 775,000 young Australians have now completed their award and approximately 45,000 are actively participating in the award programme each year, supported by a network of 60,000 volunteers acting as award leaders, supervisors and assessors.

The Duke of Edinburgh's International Award can be found in over 1,200 locations and institutions across Australia including cities, rural and remote areas, through Government and independent schools, universities, indigenous communities, refugee support programmes, detention centres, community organisations, disability groups and other youth programmes. From 2018 to 2024, the National Chairman was Gary Nairn, and the National CEO is Peter Kaye. The Hon Larry Anthony is the chair of The Friends of The Duke of Edinburgh's Award in Australia and Andrew Murray AM is the deputy chair.

As of 2025, the award became available to complete through the Australian Army Cadets, making it more accessible and cheaper for people to complete the award.

=== Bangladesh ===
In Bangladesh, the award is offered through The Duke of Edinburgh's International Award Foundation Bangladesh, which has been based in Dhaka since 2008. Various schools and universities participate.

=== Canada ===
The first Duke of Edinburgh's Award ceremony in Canada was held in 1964. By 2011, approximately 500,000 Canadians had received the award over the programme's 57-year history. In 2013, the Royal Bank of Canada announced a $1 million grant to help fund marketing and publicity efforts to increase awareness for the programme.

=== Cyprus ===
Participation in the Award has been available for many years.

=== Eswatini ===
"The Prince Makhosini Award" had 3,000 young people participating in the programme in Eswatini (formerly Swaziland) as of 2013.

=== Ghana ===
The scheme in Ghana is named the Head of State Award. It began in 1967, and by 2021 about 750,000 young people had taken part.

=== Hong Kong ===
The "Hong Kong Award for Young People", formerly known as "The Duke of Edinburgh's Award", is one of the active members of the International Award Association. The Hong Kong Award was incepted in 1961. Currently, there are roughly 53,000 youth participants in Hong Kong. More than 600 different user units, including schools, universities, uniform group youth organisations and community centres, are running the Award Scheme.

=== India ===
India awards the "International Award for Young People" to youth who complete a self-improvement programme based on the Duke of Edinburgh's award model. The programme was first introduced to India in 1962 and was originally operated by the Indian Public Schools Conference. In 1989 the Award Programme Foundation, a registered charity, was established to oversee management of the award. According to the Award Programme Foundation, implementation of awards are undertaken by 154 local institutions, including governments, NGOs and universities. Despite the long history of the programme in India, only about 19,000 youth annually participate. As in many other nations, awards in India are granted in three levels – Gold, Silver and Bronze – based on the complexity and time commitment of the projects undertaken by the individual award participant.

=== Ireland ===
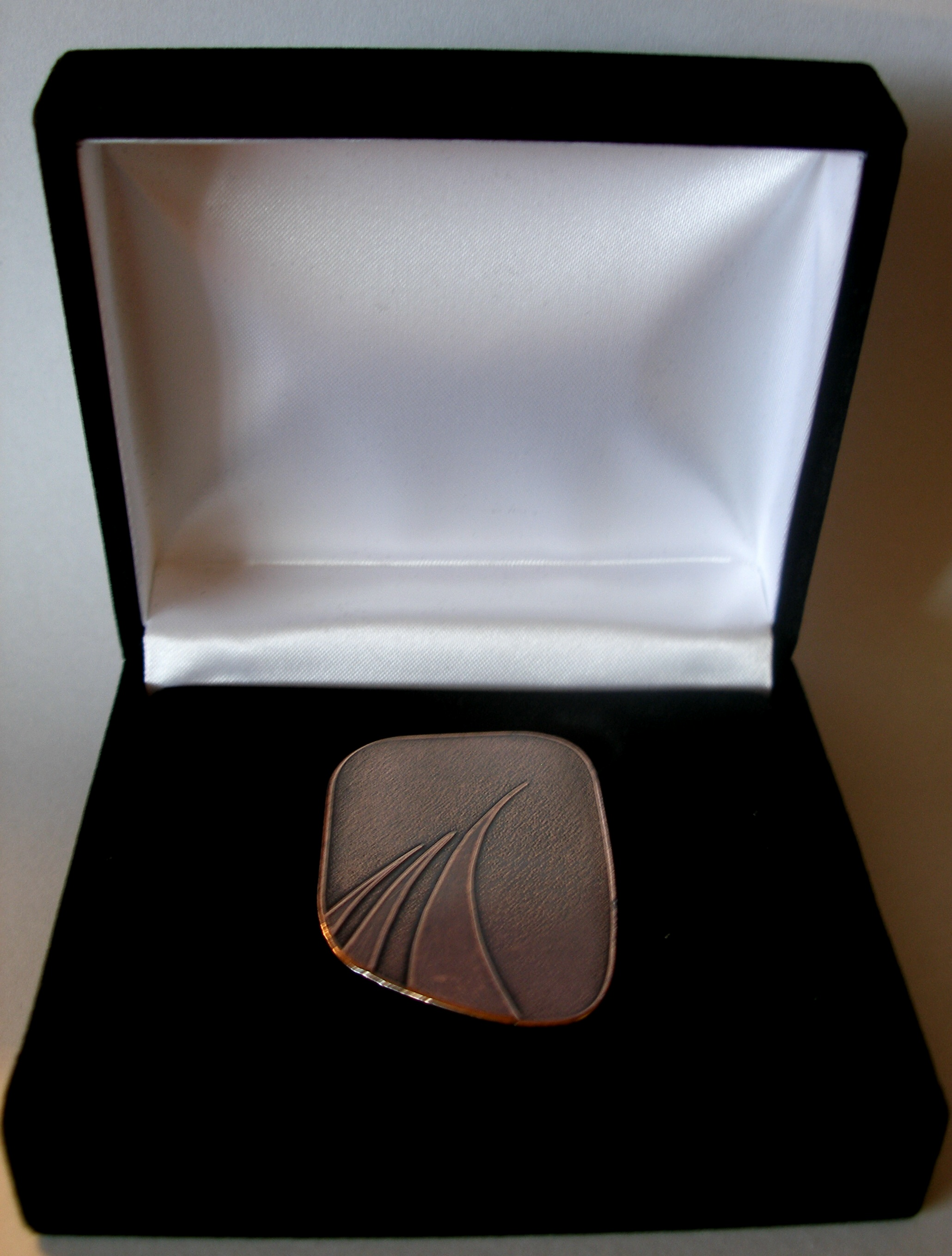
Gaisce – The President's Award

"Gaisce – The President's Award" (Irish: Gaisce – Gradam an Uachtaráin) was established by a trust deed under the patronage of the President of Ireland on 28 March 1985. It joined the Duke of Edinburgh's International Awards Association in 1988. There are three awards: bronze, silver and gold. The profile of the award was raised substantially during the term of Mary Robinson.

=== Israel ===
The "Israel Youth Award" is part of the global Duke of Edinburgh's International Award program. Open to Israeli youth aged 14 to 25 from all backgrounds - Jews, Arabs, Druze, Christians - the program promotes personal growth, leadership, and community involvement across three progressive levels: Bronze, Silver, and Gold. Participants engage in activities focused on developing skills, participating in sports, volunteering, and undertaking adventurous journeys, all tailored to their interests and abilities. The program emphasizes multiculturalism and inclusion, allowing Israeli youth to connect with peers both nationally and internationally through various exchanges and delegations, while fostering individual effort and self-improvement as the basis for achievement.

=== Korea ===
The award was established in Korea in 2008 by Korea Youth Services Centre. The award is currently supported under The Ministry of Gender Equality and Family, which is an organisation organised by the government. The applicants have to be in an age in between 14 and 25. Anyone who is over 14 but under 25 can challenge for the bronze award, but the applicants have to be at least 15 to start the silver medal, as well as the gold medal starts from 16. Despite the fact that there have been fewer than ten gold medal winners in eight years, there has been an exponential increase of the number of applicants in Korea. It reached its peak in 2011, which recorded 3,500 applicants and there are over 6,000 young people, who have completed their awards by 2015. Also, there are 17 organisations or associations that are supporting the award.

=== Lesotho ===
"The Prince Mohato Award" was established in 1976. Its current patron is King Letsie III. As with other nations, the award is presented in three levels and eligible youth are those age 14 to 25. The chairperson of the awards programme is Maureen Nyathi.

=== Malaysia ===
In Malaysia, the award is referred to as " Anugerah Remaja Perdana, RAKAN MUDA". It is a Full Member of The Duke of Edinburgh's International Association and was officially launched in Malaysia on 6 Nov 2000. The gold award will be awarded by the Malaysian Minister of Youth and Sport at an award ceremony.

=== New Zealand ===
In New Zealand, although one or two organisations started taking part earlier, it was not until 18 July 1963 that the Governor-General, Bernard Fergusson, Baron Ballantrae, held the inaugural meeting of the National Council of The Duke of Edinburgh's Award in New Zealand at Government House in Wellington, when a Constitution for The Award in New Zealand was adopted. In New Zealand the Award is referred to as the Duke of Edinburgh's Hillary Award. The name draws on one of New Zealand's greatest adventurers, Sir Edmund Hillary. The Award has also previously been called "The Young New Zealanders Challenge of the Duke of Edinburgh's Hillary Award".

=== Netherlands ===
The Award was founded in the Netherlands in 1997 by Wim van der Laan and Maurice Jurgens. Known as "The International Award for Young People", it was officially recognised by the ministry of education in 2007 as a substitute for community service in secondary education and is currently being offered by 45 institutions.

=== Portugal ===
The "Prémio Infante D. Henrique" is the Portuguese version of the Duke of Edinburgh's Award targeting those between 14-and-24-years-old. It was established in 1988 in Porto by The Duke of Braganza, who remains its honorary president. In 2015 the Prémio Infante D. Henrique became a licensee of the Duke of Edinburgh's Award and adopted the international brand. The Prémio Infante D. Henrique consists of a programme of personal and social development of voluntary and non-competitive activities in four areas:

- Community service
- Personal talents
- Sports
- Expedition
- Residential project – only for those who are older than 16-years-old.

=== Romania ===
The Award was first introduced in 1991 by Sister Agnes in the Roman Catholic Parish of Motru, being carried on locally until 2011. Since 2011, the programme has expanded nationwide, where it was successfully implemented in several cities of Romania. In April 2013, the license for Award Romania was signed in the presence of Secretary-General John May, and it became a National Award Authority. Starting in June 2013, The Duke of Edinburgh's International Award has Margareta, Custodian of the Romanian Crown, as Patron in Romania. Since then, the Award has seen a rapid expansion, engaging over 10,000 young people and over 2,000 Award Leaders and adult volunteers, with millions having participated around the world, finding their purpose, passion and place in the world.

=== Singapore ===
In Singapore, the award is referred to as "National Youth Achievement Award". It is a full member of The Duke of Edinburgh's International Association and was officially launched in Singapore on 9 May 1992 by president Wee Kim Wee at the Istana.

=== South Africa ===
In South Africa, the Award is referred to as the "President's Award for Youth Empowerment". The Award was first established in 1983 under the name "Gold Shield Award", but in 1992, in anticipation of Nelson Mandela becoming the first president of a democratic South Africa, the name was changed to "President's Award for Youth Empowerment". The President's Award has a full licence to operate the Award in South Africa, from the Duke of Edinburgh's International Award Foundation. It provides a framework for youth-at-risk, providing them with a positive, affirming alternative to the social challenges which they face within their communities. The Award Programme is a long-term process, taking between three and five years to complete all three levels of Bronze, Silver, and Gold.

=== United States ===
In the United States, the award is offered through "The Duke of Edinburgh's International Award USA" organization, based in Chicago. Various schools and some Scout councils participate.

=== Zambia ===
"The Duke of Edinburgh International Award", "The International Youth Award", or simply "The International Award" was founded in Zambia in 1989. Although the concept was introduced in September 1981, it was only in 1989 when the Zambian government decided to integrate it into the President's Youth Award of Zambia. In 1990, a National Youth Award Committee was elected and operated under the National Youth Development Council (NYDC). In May 1991, a pilot project started with 50 young individuals and by December the same year 30 had qualified for the Bronze Award level. In the mid-1990s, the Award got a new lease of life when private schools began to adopt the Award, reporting directly to the International Secretariat in London in the absence of a National Award Authority. At this point, slight name variations arose in different private schools depending on organisers; however, the integrity of the award is still maintained.

== See also ==
- Outward Bound
- Hong Kong Award for Young People, known formerly as Duke of Edinburgh's Award
- The President's Challenge
