= Seven Little Australians (musical) =

- Program cover of original Australian production
- Music: David Reeves
- Lyrics: John Palmer and David Reeves
- Book: David Reeves, John Palmer and Peter Yeldham
- Basis: Seven Little Australians by Ethel Turner
- Productions: 1988-89 Melbourne/national tour 1991 Brisbane

Seven Little Australians is an Australian musical with music by David Reeves, lyrics by John Palmer and Reeves and book by Reeves, Palmer and Peter Yeldham. It is based on the classic Australian children's 1894 novel Seven Little Australians by Ethel Turner.

== Development ==
David Reeves and Jim Graham, teachers from The Armidale School, first conceived a musical based on the children's novel Seven Little Australians in the late 1970s.

== Production history ==
The original production of Seven Little Australians opened in Melbourne at the Comedy Theatre on 22 June 1988. It was directed by John O'May and choreographed by Pamela French with musical direction by Reeves. The cast included John O'May, Melissa Bickerton, Alyce Platt, John Murphy, Judith McGrath, Judith Roberts and Noel Mitchell. The production moved to the Adelaide Festival Centre from 20 November 1988, and also played in Tasmania. A remount at the Footbridge Theatre in Sydney played from 16 September 1989.

A second production by the Royal Queensland Theatre Company played in Brisbane from 21 February to 16 March 1991 at the Suncorp Theatre.

== Reception ==
Seven Little Australians received generally positive reviews. Leonard Radic in The Age called it "a comfortable family-style show: warmhearted, sentimental and ever so wholesome", with the music "bright, conventional and homogenised" while "the book and lyrics follow a familiar pattern too".

The cast recording was nominated for an ARIA Award for Best Original Soundtrack or Cast Recording in 1989.
