= Maybanke Anderson =

Australian political reformer (1845–1927)

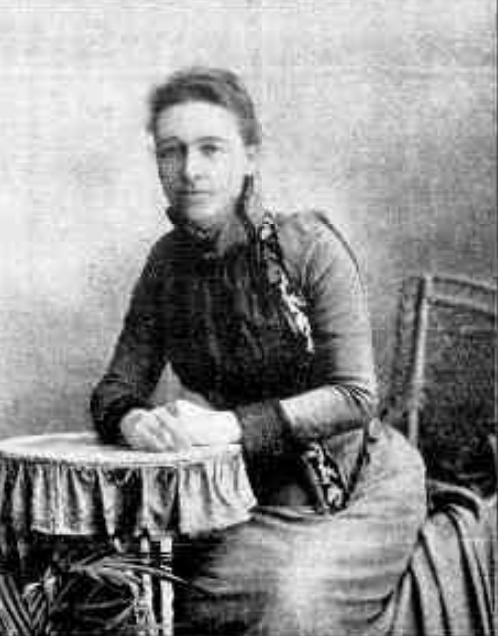
- Maybanke Anderson, c.1893
- Born: Maybanke Selfe; 16 February 1845; Kingston upon Thames, England, United Kingdom of Great Britain and Ireland
- Died: 15 April 1927 (aged 82); Paris, France
- Occupation: Suffragist
- Spouses: Edmund Kay Wolstenholme (m. 1867; div. 1893) Francis Anderson (m. 1899)

Maybanke Susannah Anderson (née Selfe and also known as Maybanke Wolstenholme; 16 February 1845 – 15 April 1927) was an Australian suffragist and education reformer involved in women's suffrage, Federation of Australia and the Free Kindergarten Movement.

== Early life ==
Maybanke Selfe was born at Kingston upon Thames, United Kingdom, near the city London. She was the daughter of Henry Selfe, a plumber, and his wife Elizabeth (née Smith), and was the sister of Norman Selfe and a cousin of Eadward Muybridge, who migrated to the United States in 1850. Her family migrated to Australia as free settlers in January 1855 when she was nine years old. Twelve years later in September 1867, Maybanke married Edmund Kay Wolstenholme, a timber merchant. The couple had seven children between 1868 and 1879, four of whom died from a heart condition before the age of five. Her son, Harry Wolstenholme, was a lawyer and keen amateur ornithologist. The Wolstenholmes built a large house called 'Maybanke' in Marrickville. The later years of the marriage were unhappy; Edmund had a number of business failures and became an alcoholic, leaving the family in 1884. Maybanke had to wait for the passage of the Divorce Amendment and Extension Act in 1892 before she could divorce Edmund on the grounds of "three years of desertion." The divorce was finalised in 1893. After the divorce, she was supported financially by her brother, the renowned engineer Norman Selfe, with whom she would later campaign for education reform.

In 1885 Maybanke opened Maybanke School, a girls' school that she operated in her home preparing girls for the University of Sydney entrance examination. Operating for 10 years, the school was later known as Maybanke College.

== Woman suffrage activist ==
Following her divorce, Maybanke took an active role in the promotion of women and children's rights. She became especially active in the women's suffrage movement; she believed that the vote was 'the kernel for all reform'. She was vice president of the Women's Literary Society started by her friend Rose Scott. Many of the society's members would go on to form the Womanhood Suffrage League of New South Wales (WSL) on 6 May 1891. In 1893 Maybanke was elected to the WSL presidency, and founded the Australasian Home Reading Union in the same year. The Union was a program to promote induction by organising small study groups in rural areas.

In 1894, Maybanke began publishing the fortnightly newspaper Woman's Voice. The paper ran for 18 months, drawing women's attention to suffrage issues at the national and international level.

During the depression of the 1890s, she pioneered the Free Kindergarten Movement. In 1895, she established the first free kindergarten in Australia at Woolloomooloo as the president of the Kindergarten Union, helping the children of working mothers.

The WSL's attempts to have suffrage implemented by the New South Wales government were not fruitful; however, in 1897, Maybanke decided to petition the 1897 Federal Convention in Adelaide. She reasoned that this would have the women's vote written into the Federal agenda. Thus, the women from South and Western Australia who already had the vote could not have it taken from them, and if there was suffrage at the federal level, it would flow down to the states. At this time, she also became involved in the pro-federation movement. She served as its president for several years. Maybanke resigned from the WSL in 1897. Suffrage was extended to the women of New South Wales in 1902.

Maybanke was inducted onto the Victorian Honour Roll of Women in 2001 in recognition of her achievements.

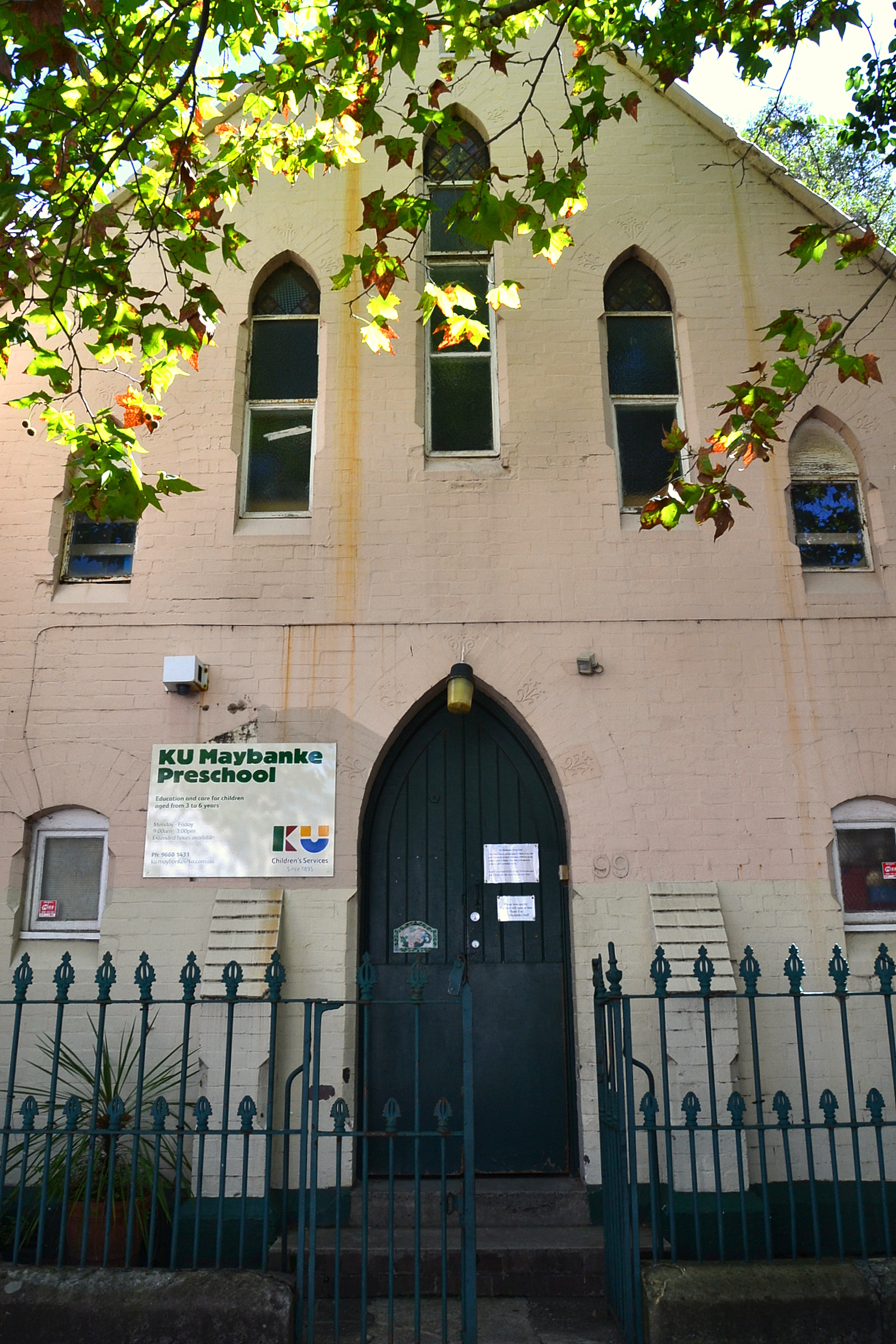
Maybanke Kindergarten in Pyrmont, New South Wales, named after Anderson

== Marriage and travel ==
In 1899, Maybanke married her second husband, Sir Francis Anderson. Anderson was the first Professor of Philosophy at the University of Sydney. They travelled and worked together on voluntary projects, including campaigning to have women stand for local government. She was active with the National Council of Women of New South Wales, and worked closely with the University Women's Society. Maybanke died in St Germain-en-Laye, Paris on 15 April 1927.

== Bibliography ==
- Roberts, Jan (1993). Maybanke Anderson: Sex, suffrage and social reform. Sydney: Hale & Iremonger. ISBN 0868064955.
