= Julia Britton =

Australian playwright

Julia Britton (27 June 1914 – 5 November 2012) was an Australian playwright. Britton was perhaps best known for her literary adaptations and biographical plays.

== Life ==
Julia Britton was born Hilda Hartt in Romiley, Cheshire 27 June 1914, the daughter of Richard and Elizabeth Hartt . She attended Withington Girls' School and later, the University of Manchester graduating with a Bachelor of Arts in 1930. She moved to South Africa six years later, where she worked as a journalist. It was during these years that she began to experiment with writing for the theatre, beginning with her un-produced play The Jacky Hangman. In 1939 she married musician/composer Philip Britton in Cape Town before they emigrated to Adelaide, South Australia with their three children in 1967 when he was appointed to the Elder Conservatorium, University of Adelaide, as the Lecturer in Music Education. She died in Adelaide on 5 November 2012.

== Plays ==
In 1984 she was appointed playwright-in-residence at the Stage Company in Adelaide, where her acclaimed play, Miles Franklin and the Rainbow's End, was developed and produced at The Space. The play was a critical and commercial success and was later invited for a season at the San Antonio Festival in Texas. It was produced again in Melbourne at the Playbox Theatre and subsequently as part of "A Short Season of Women Writers at La Mama" (1992). It was again revived at Theatreworks by Fly-On-The-Wall Theatre in 2000 and transferred to Perth's The Blue Room as part of the inaugural WA Fringe Festival.

Through friend actor/director Malcolm Robertson, Britton was introduced to director Robert Chuter in 1988, with whom she would later form a long-lasting partnership.

In 1991 she was commissioned to write Loving Friends which was produced site-specific at the National Trust of Australia property Rippon Lea in Elsternwick, Melbourne. The play, that was based on the life of arts patron Lady Ottoline and the Bloomsbury set, was a sell out success and followed with a revival the following year. The sequel to Loving Friends was An Indian Summer, which proved equally as popular.

In 1995 they made national headlines with their notorious adaptation of D.H. Lawrence's Lady Chatterley's Lover, produced as a site-specific adaption by Peter Holmes à Court (Back Row Productions), Foster Gracie and EHW Productions. The play became a succès de scandal thanks to its daring frankness and faithfulness to the source novels and was so popular that it received seven seasons across Australia in Melbourne, Adelaide, Sydney and eventually in Perth, where it was met with opposition when the Christian Democrats attempted to have the production closed down.

Her collaborations with Chuter continued with biographical productions of The Object of Desire (about Duncan Grant), The Lost (about Christopher Isherwood), The White Rose and the Blue (about Percy Grainger), I've Danced With A Girl Who Danced With The Prince Of Wales (about Prince Edward) and The Yellow Book (about Aubrey Beardsley). Literary adaptations include Little Lord Fauntleroy, Women In Love, Anne of Green Gables, Good Morning, Midnight! and Seven Little Australians.

Other productions produced include "The Singing Forest", "Sunset Children", "Five Minute Call", "The Dream Children", "A Singular Man" and others.

Her other productions include Animal Farm, Space Travel Unlimited, Erotica in Black and White and Mrs. Bloem.

Her plays have been produced in Melbourne at La Mama, Carlton Courthouse, Melbourne Town Hall, The Butterfly Club, Theatreworks, Melbourne Theatre Company, Playbox Theatre, fortyfivedownstairs, St Martins Theatre, Chapel Off Chapel; in Sydney at Griffin Theatre, Parnassus' Den, North West Theatre Company, New Theatre; in Adelaide at Theatre 62, Stage Company, Budgie Lung, State Theatre Company of South Australia, Lion Arts Centre; in Perth at The Blue Room] and at the Hong Kong Fringe Festival.

Britton's Oblomov's Dream and Fresh Pleasures were both staged in London. The staging of Fresh Pleasures along with her life and career, was the subject of the documentary Fearless.

== Radio plays ==
A Cage in the Country (produced by ABC) and Ritual Killing (produced by 5UV).

== Music theatre ==
Britton collaborated with daughter, musician, Louise Woodcock, who initiated and directed Music of Milhaud (1995), Faith, Folk & Fun: A Music Theatre-Patchwork (1997), Lord Byron: Child of Scotland (1998) and Robert Burns: Lov'd at Home, Rever'd Abroad (1998).

== Screenplays ==
In 2009 her stage play and original screenplay The Dream Children was adapted by Angus Brown. The feature film The Dream Children was produced by Fat Kid Films and is set for 2014 theatrical release. Britton served as the executive producer on the picture.

Her other screenplays include adaptations of Henry Handel Richardson's Maurice Guest and Ann Bridge's Peking Picnic. The staged rehearsed reading of 'Maurice Guest', directed by Jackson Raine and produced by Chuter was presented at Chapel Off Chapel in January 2013.

== Awards ==
- AWGIE Awards, Monte Miller Award, 1982 for Exits and Entrances
- Winner of section three of McGregor Literary Competition for A Cage in the Country, later produced by ABC radio
