= William Parker (master) =

Australian barrister

William Arthur Parker
- Born: 1870; Orange, New South Wales
- Died: 1953 (aged 82–83); Manar; Potts Point, New South Wales
- Education: Newington College; University of Sydney
- Occupations: Solicitor, Barrister, Master
- Title: The Hon. Master William Parker
- Spouse: Gertrude Lillian (nee Bavin)
- Children: 1 daughter

William Arthur Parker (1870 – 13 July 1953) was an Australian barrister who served as Master in Equity and Master in Lunacy in the Supreme Court of New South Wales from 1918 until 1940.

== Early life ==
Parker was born in Orange, New South Wales, the son of Josiah and Henrietta Matilda Parker and attended Newington College (1883–1887). In 1886 and again in 1887, he won the Wigram Allen Scholarship, endowed by Sir George Wigram Allen, for mathematics, with Herbert Curlewis receiving it in 1886 for classics. At the end of 1887 Parker was named dux of the college and received the Schofield Scholarship. He went up to the University of Sydney and in 1892 graduated as a Bachelor of Arts and in 1898 LL.B.

== Marriage ==
In 1903, Parker married Gertrude Lillian Bavin. She was born in New Zealand, a daughter of the Rev. Rainsford Bavin, a Methodist minister from Lincolnshire, England, and his New Zealand-born wife Emma, née Buddle. Her siblings were: Edna (Mrs Charles Lack); Jessie (Mrs Ambrose Fletcher); Sir Thomas Bavin; Major Cyril Bavin OBE; Horace Bavin; Florence Bavin (Mrs Ernest Warren); Lancelot Bavin; and Dora Bavin (Mrs Leslie Allen). Parker and his wife lived at Manar in Potts Point.

== Legal career ==
Parker practised at the Sydney Bar in the equity and probate jurisdictions from 1900. In 1918, he was appointed Master in Equity and Master in Lunacy in New South Wales. Parker retired from public service in 1940.

Awards
| Preceded by Herbert Curlewis | Schofield Scholarship; Dux of Newington College; 1887 | Succeeded by Frederick Pratt |
