= Francis Anderson (philosopher) =

Australian philosopher and educationist

Sir Francis Anderson
- Born: 3 September 1858; Glasgow, Scotland
- Died: 24 June 1941 (aged 82); Sydney, Australia
- Education: University of Glasgow (M.A.)
- Occupations: Philosopher and educator
- Spouses: Maybanke Selfe Wolstenholme, Josephine Wight
- Children: none
- Parents: Francis Anderson (father); Elizabeth Anna Lockart, née Ellison (mother)

Sir Francis Anderson (3 September 1858 – 24 June 1941) was a Scottish-born Australian philosopher and educator.

== Early life ==
Francis Anderson was born in Glasgow, the son of Francis Anderson, a manufacturer, and his wife Elizabeth Anna Lockart, née Ellison. Anderson was educated at Old Wynd and Oatlands public schools and became a pupil-teacher at the age of 14. He went on to the University of Glasgow, matriculating in 1876 and graduated M.A. in 1883. He was awarded Sir Richard Jebb's prize for Greek literature, took first place in the philosophical classes of Professors Veitch and Caird, and won two scholarships. For two years he was assistant to the professor of moral philosophy, studied in the theological faculty with the intention of entering the ministry, but apparently was not ordained.

== Honours and legacy ==
Anderson was knighted in the 1936 King's Birthday Honours and died in Sydney on 24 June 1941. for "educational and social welfare services".

His monograph on Liberty, Equality and Fraternity was published by the Association of Psychology and Philosophy.

== Personal life ==
He married twice, firstly to Maybanke Selfe Wolstenholme, and then to Josephine Wight who survived him; there were no children.
