= Harry Wolstenholme =

Australian lawyer and ornithologist (1868–1930)

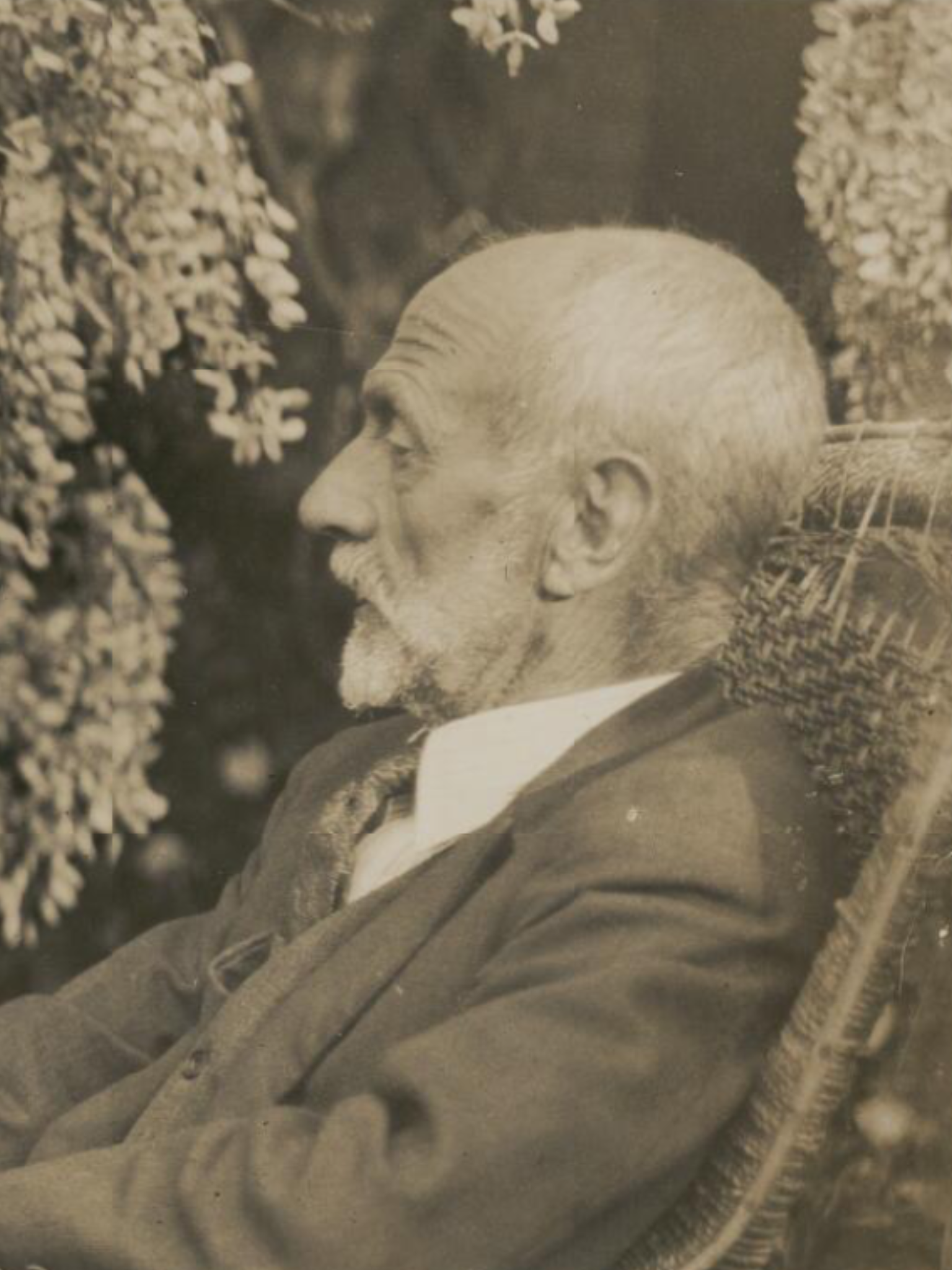
- Born: 21 June 1868; Maitland, New South Wales
- Died: 14 October 1930; Wahroonga, New South Wales
- Education: Newington College; University of Sydney
- Occupations: Solicitor & ornithologist
- Spouse: Edith Lucy (née Doust)
- Parent(s): Edmund Wolstenholme & Maybanke Anderson

Harry Wolstenholme (21 June 1868 – 14 October 1930) was an Australian lawyer and ornithologist.

== Early life ==
Wolstenholme was born in Maitland, New South Wales, the son of Edmund Kay Wolstenholme, a timber merchant from West Maitland, and Maybanke Susannah Anderson (1845–1927), feminist and educationist. When his parents moved to Marrickville, New South Wales, he became a pupil at Newington College (1881–1885). In 1883, 1884 and 1885 he was awarded the Wigram Allen Scholarship, awarded by Sir George Wigram Allen, sharing it in 1885 with Herbert Curlewis. At the end of 1885 he was named dux of the college and received the Schofield Scholarship. At the University of Sydney he graduated B.A. in 1890. Wolstenholme married Edith Lucy Doust (1875–1947) on 8 January 1902 in the Methodist Church, Stanmore. Lucy was the sister of Stanley Doust and was an early female graduate at the University of Sydney and tennis player.

== Legal career ==
He entered the legal profession and between 1907 and 1910 was in partnership with Henry Davis, the founder of Henry Davis York. Failing health caused his retirement from professional activity.

== Ornithology ==
Wolstenholme was a member of the Royal Australasian Ornithologists Union, to which he was a generous benefactor, and a member of its council. He served as a trustee of Ku-ring-gai Chase National Park.

== Publications ==
- The Official Checklist of the Birds of Australia: With Appendix: Scientific Names-Notes and Pronunciation

== Portrait ==
A portrait of Wolstenholme feeding a thrush in the garden of his home at Wahroonga, New South Wales is held by the National Library of Australia.

Awards
Preceded by Harold Hunt	Schofield Scholarship; Dux of Newington College; 1885	Succeeded by Herbert Curlewis
