= The Family at Misrule =

Novel by Australian writer Ethel Turner

- Author: Ethel Turner
- Language: English
- Genre: Fiction
- Publisher: Ward, Lock & Co.
- Publication date: 25 October 1895
- Publication place: Australia
- Media type: Print
- Pages: 282 pp
- Preceded by: Seven Little Australians
- Followed by: Story of a Baby

The Family at Misrule (1895) is a novel for children by Australian writer Ethel Turner. It is a sequel to the author's 1894 novel Seven Little Australians. The novel was originally published in the UK by Ward, Lock & Co. in 1895.

== Abstract ==
Five years on from the events of Seven Little Australians and Bunty runs off, accused of theft. His family believes he has headed for America but he stays around Sydney where he is later recognised by a sister and returned to the family fold. Nellie attends a dinner party and returns with scarlet fever.

== Publishing history ==
Following the book's initial publication by Ward, Lock & Co. in 1895 it was subsequently reprinted five times by the same publisher between 1895 and 1900 and then re-published as follows:

- David McKay, 1910, USA
- Ward, Lock & Co., 1949, UK
- Angus and Robertson, 1989, Australia

along with various paperback editions.

== Critical reception ==
A reviewer writing in Table Talk noted of the novel: "This work will add considerably to Miss Turner's well deserved and widely growing reputation and will gain for her a large circle of sympathetic readers who are ready at all times to welcome a writer whose style is simple and natural and free from the unhealthy tone pervading modern introspective and problematical fiction...Descriptive power, humour and pathos are the three chief characteristics of Miss Turner's writing, and extracts innumerable might be quoted in illustration of each quality."

A reviewer in The Sydney Morning Herald wrote that while the novel was rather restricted by being a sequel: "The Family at Misrule is a story without preachiness, but healthy throughout, and the few discordant notes will not be noticed by the circle of young readers who will be not its only, but perhaps its most loyal, audience."

== Notes ==
- A writer in The Traralgon Record in 1895 noted that the original proposed title for the book was Growing Up, but as this was already in use the new title of The Family at Misrule was chosen instead.
- A column in The Australian Town and Country Journal in 1896 states that the book, along with the author's earlier Seven Little Australians had been translated into Dutch, but no record of this edition has yet been discovered.

== See also ==
- 1895 in Australian literature
