= Adrian Curlewis =

Australian judge

Sir Adrian Curlewis

Judge of the District Court (NSW)
- In office 1948–1971

Personal details
- Born: Adrian Herbert Curlewis; 13 January 1901 Mosman, New South Wales
- Died: 16 June 1985 (aged 84) Mosman, New South Wales
- Spouse(s): Beatrice (Betty) Maude Carr; Married 12 December 1928
- Children: Son Ian; Daughter Phillipa
- Parent(s): Herbert Raine Curlewis; Ethel Turner
- Relatives: Sister Ethel Jean Sophia Curlewis
- Education: Sydney Church of England Grammar School (Shore); University of Sydney
- Occupation: Barrister; Judge

Sir Adrian Herbert Curlewis, CVO, CBE (13 January 1901 – 16 June 1985) was an Australian barrister, captain in WW2, a Changi and Thai-Burma Railway POW and later District Court judge. He was also a sportsman, one of the early surfers in Sydney and later a sports administrator.

== Early life ==
Adrian Curlewis was born to Ethel Turner, author and Herbert Raine Curlewis, barrister and later judge, at Mosman. Both his parents were involved in the community.

Curlewis started school at Mosman Preparatory School, attended Sydney Church of England Grammar School (Shore) where he became a senior prefect and after matriculating attended University of Sydney. He studied law.

He volunteered to work cleaning engines during the Australian General Strike of 1917.

While still a student, he met his wife Betty at a party, and taught her to surf. She learnt easily and they were married at St Philips, Church Hill in December 1928. They had two children, Phillipa and Ian.

He was called to the NSW Bar in 1927.

== Military service ==
Curlewis had wanted to enlist in World War I but his parents would not permit this until he was 18 years old, by which time to armistice was signed.

He became an officer in cadet corp at school in 1920 and at university joined the University Regiment as an orderly room corporal becoming an officer after a year before the militia was disbanded.

He was commissioned in the Militia on 6 June 1939 one week before the start of the war and transferred to the AIF, in September 1940, in February 1941 he was a Captain, General Staff Officer, in Headquarters 8th Division AIF, in Malaya and Singapore, he was taken prisoner by the Japanese with the surrender of Singapore on 15 February 1942. As with all allied troops he was sent to Changi POW Camp.

He participated in the early set up of the so-called Changi University in the POW camp. He worked under Brigadier H B Taylor, dubbed the Chancellor and Curlewis was dubbed the Dean of Law. Within 10 day of surrender Curlewis worked with Lesley Greener to develop a diverse range of courses. The objective of the Changi University was to address the boredom of being a prisoner of war, provide education to the men some who had missed a lot of school due to the depression and enlisting in the army.

Curlewis also worked on the wharves unloading vessels for the Japanese until April 1943 after which he was sent with a working party to the Thai-Burma Railway.

During his time as a POW, Curlewis kept two secret diaries.

The Australian War Memorial holds two recordings of Captain Adrian Curlewis' memory of the war on 11 April 1984.

The Army discharged him at 4pm on 26 January 1946 to civilian life and the reserve of officers. He was in his chambers as a civilian Barrister by 4:30pm the same day and had a barrister's brief the next day.

== The judiciary ==
In 1948 Curlewis was appointed a judge of the District Court of New South Wales and retired in 1971.

Curlewis participated in a number of inquiries:

- 1950 Royal Commission into the Claremont Hospital for the Mentally Insane, Western Australia
- State shark menace advisory committee (1934–35)
- commission of inquiry (1973–74) into Privately Operated Omnibus and Tourist Vehicle Services in New South Wales.

The painting His Hon. Judge Adrian Curlewis by Henry Aloysius Hanke was a finalist in the Art Gallery of NSW, 1962 Archibald Prize.

== Sport and community ==
In his early youth, Curlewis used to swim every morning at Chinaman's Beach or the Spit Baths, at Shore he stroked (rowed) with the First Four and was captain of the Rugby Union Firsts.

After witnessing a drowning in 1920, Curlewis decided to become a Life Saver. He was a founding member of the Palm Beach Surf Life Saving Club and was involved in the sport, locally, nationally and internationally for over 50 years.

He is one of the early surfers in Australia. He purchased his first surfboard in 1923, a 70-pounder, and his second of similar design in 1926. Curlewis could ride the board either standing on his feet, or standing on his head.

Outward Bound movement in New South Wales, was founded by Curlewis in 1956.

In 1960 Curlewis chaired the International Convention on Lifesaving Techniques that recommended and led to general adoption of the 'kiss of life' for resuscitation drowning victims.

There is a national scholarship program to build leadership in young adults called the Sir Adrian Curlewis Scholarship. The scholarship program provides mentoring for one young person, over the age of 21 years, in each state in surf life saving for a period of one year.

He was the first National Co-ordinator appointed in 1958 by HRH Prince Philip and the first National Chair for the Duke of Edinburgh's International Award – Australia from 1962 to 1973.

== Awards ==
Adrian Curlewis has been recognised with the following awards for service to the community:

- Australian Father of the Year award in 1961;
- Commander of the Order of the British Empire (CBE) in 1962 for his service as "President of the Surf Life Saving Association";
- Royal Victorian Order – Commander (CVO) in 1974, for his service as "Co-Ordinator – Duke of Edinburgh's Award Scheme ";
- Knight Bachelor in 1967, "In recognition of service to the community";
- In 2017 Duke of Edinburgh's International Award – Gold Distinguished Service Medal was posthumously awarded to Adrian.

== Membership ==
Curlewis was a member and active participant in the following organisations:

- State Shark Menace Advisory Committee (1934–35)
- New South Wales Bar Association
- Youth Policy Advisory Committee NSW (Chairman 1961)
- Surf Life Saving Association of Australia (President 1934–41, 1945–75)
- International Council of Lifesaving (President
- National Fitness Council (NSW) (Chairman 1949–71)
- Outward Bound (Founder 1956)
- Duke of Edinburgh Award (National Co-ordinator 1962–73)
- Royal Humane Society NSW (President 1968–84)
- Red Cross Appeals Committee (Chairman)
- Shore (school) Council
- 8th Division Council
- International Convention on Life Saving Techniques (Convenor and Chairman 1960)

== Books ==
The following books reference the work, achievements and writings of Adrian Curlewis:

- Of Love and War: The Letters and Diaries of Captain Adrian Curlewis and his family 1939–1945, by Phillipa Poole (Adrian's daughter), 1983 – 280 pages.
- The sportsmen of Changi, Kevin Blackburn, Sydney, New South Publishing, 2012, P127.
- LEGENDARY SURFERS Volume 3: The 1930s, Malcolm Gault-Williams, Lulu.com, 12 Dec 2012, P18.
- Across the Sea to War, Peter Plowman, Rosenberg Publishing, 2014, P208.
- The Changi Brownlow, Roland Perry, Hachette UK, 31 Jul. 2012, P23.
- Australian's Century of Surf, Tim Baker, Random House Australia, 2013
