= Robert Chuter =

Australian actor

Robert John Chuter (born 23 April 1964 in Carlton, Victoria, Australia) is an Australian actor, film and theatre director and producer.

== Early life ==
Robert John Chuter was born on 23 April 1964 in Carlton, Victoria, Australia, the only son of Rita Spalding and British emigrant Harry Chuter. He was educated at Williamstown Technical School and studied at RMIT, St. Martin's Theatre School, Melbourne Theatre Company Youth Theatre, Victorian College of the Arts - Drama School. He graduated in 1983 from Swinburne Film and Television School.

== Career ==
In 1976, Chuter worked with a touring company led by Lindsay Kemp in Australia and London and later cited the experience as an inspiration for becoming involved in theatre direction. His interest in film direction originated while working in a bookstore, when he was encouraged to create some Super 8 film by Australian silent screen and stage actress Agnes Dobson.

In 1981, he was a trainee director at the Queensland Theatre Company in Brisbane directing the highly successful production of David Allen's Upside Down at the Bottom of the World. Returning to Melbourne, he co-founded Performing Arts Projects (later to become Fly-On-The-Wall Theatre) with actor/playwright Daniel Lillford in 1985.

Between 2005 and 2008, Chuter worked in London directing three stage productions. Chuter has directed over 200 stage productions in Australia and the UK. He won a Green Room Award for his stage production In Angel Gear.

== Stage ==
Heeding advice from British film director Ken Russell, whom he met during his work directing the opera Madam Butterfly in Melbourne, Chuter has been diverse in his stage productions:

"I direct family shows, like the sell-out seasons of Anne of Green Gables and the children’s classic: Seven Little Australians, to plays about porn icons, drug culture, the Bloomsbury group, the Brontes, IVF, artists, feminist writers and serial killers. Diversity is the name of the game, and I love work which is challenging to the imagination. Can you imagine directing an opera when you don’t speak French and can’t remember music? Yep, I’ve done it - not sure if I was successful or not".

== Film ==
While at Swinburne Film and Television School, Chuter produced student films including In from the Sea, XOS: A Cry for Help, Tax, Letting Go and Killer Zombies. He worked on various short films as production assistant, casting and costume designer including Laughing with Joe, Paradise Taxi, Oedipus Tex, The Search of the Golden Boomerang, Jacob's Dream, The Uniform, Best Wishes for the Baby's Arrival, Inverted Kiss (unfinished) and Jacob's Dream.

He directed the 2015 feature The Dream Children co-produced by Chuter and Christopher Pender. He had previously directed a stage version, written by Julia Britton, for Fly-On-The-Wall Theatre and La Mama Theatre in 2009. He was co-producer and production manager on Dale Crawford's award-winning feature Lilith (aka Insomnia City).

== Exhibitions ==
Chuter produced, hosted, directed and curated events with artists such as Kent Morris on The Double Infant and The Kitchen Child, Josie Wadelton on Defaced: The Exhibition in 2010 and Anthony Breslin (and other artists) on In Good Company and with Breslin on St. Kaleidoscopia in 2023 and Love Bug Lane in 2024.
