= Jean Curlewis =

Australian children's writer

- Born: 7 February 1898; Mosman, Sydney, Australia
- Died: 30 March 1930 (aged 32)
- Occupation: Novelist

Jean Curlewis (7 February 1898 – 28 March 1930) was an Australian writer. The daughter of Ethel Turner and Herbert Curlewis she battled tuberculosis for many years before dying at 32 years of age.

== Life ==
Ethel Jean Sophia Curlewis was born in Sydney and spent her early years in Mosman. She grew up in a cultured and literate upper-middle-class family. Her mother was the popular author of Seven Little Australians and her father was a barrister and later a judge of the District Court of New South Wales. She attended Killarney, the Church of England Grammar School in Mosman where her family lived. Later Curlewis attended Sydney Church of England Girls' Grammar School in Darlinghurst. There is little doubt that the close bond between mother and daughter, the cultured lifestyle of her parents and the society in which she was raised helped Curlewis to develop into a highly literate, socially aware and articulate young woman. Because she was genuinely concerned with issues of social welfare it is not surprising to learn that she served as a Voluntary Aid, relieving overworked nurses during the Spanish 'flu epidemic that devastated Sydney in 1919. It is likely that during this period, when she was particularly open to infection, Curlewis contracted the tuberculosis that would ultimately claim her life. In 1923 Curlewis married Dr Leo Charlton and the couple spent two years in London while Charlton was engaged in postgraduate studies. Her later years were spent in a family cottage at the Blue Mountains and in private hospitals where she died from the disease she had fought for almost a decade.

== Career ==
One of her early literary mentors was the poet, Dorothea Mackellar, who encouraged her writing of poetry and who, after Jean's death, wrote an article for Art in Australia in which she labelled Curlewis as 'the best kind of Australian' because of her clear-sightedness, her sense of style and force of emotion. Like her illustrious mother Curlewis began her literary career early in life, becoming involved when only eighteen with her Aunt Lilian in writing 'legends and native stuff' for a new children's magazine planned for the Mirror. Later, after her return from England, Curlewis wrote articles for newspapers, the Home magazine and Australia Beautiful. She also contributed largely to 'Sunbeams', a children's supplement to The Sunday Sun, begun in 1921 and edited by her mother.

Like her mother, Curlewis' ambition was to become a respected novelist, and despite her contribution to the light-hearted The Sunshine Family she was most interested in novels which had serious themes embedded in well-paced stories. Primarily a storyteller, Jean Curlewis wrote in her short life four different novels. Each book recreates aspects of Australian society in the 1920s which were part of the writer's own experience.

The title of Jean Curlewis's first novel, The Ship that Never Set Sail (1921), turned out to be a foreboding reference to Jean's own life, in that she died so young and before she had time to develop her talent. But the title also refers to a recurring theme in her stories, for 'the ship that never set sail' is a symbol, in that first novel, of youth's romantic idealism forced to come to terms with the realities of life and the pressures of society. The Ship that Never Set Sail is the most personal of Jean Curlewis's novels and, although it contains elements that were to appear in her subsequent writing, it has a feminine grace that is not to be found to the same degree in the later yarns. Those novels, however, owe a great deal to genres less explored by her mother and her aunt.

Drowning Maze (1922) opens in the tradition of the school story as it was then established, but moves into melodrama – or Comic-Opera Country as one chapter is headed. Were she writing today, Curlewis's second, third and fourth novels would undoubtedly have moved more directly into 'metafiction' in that she makes deliberate use of the conventions of the genres established by writers such as H. Rider Haggard, John Buchan, Rudyard Kipling and G. K. Chesterton, with direct literary references to such writers, but also an ironic use of plot techniques such as the race against time, the chase, and misunderstandings that must be cleared up before the story can unravel.

== Works ==
- The Ship That Never Set Sail (1921)
- Drowning Maze (1922)
- Beach Beyond (1923)
- The Dawn Man (1924)
- Verse Writing for Beginners (1925)
- Christmas in Australia – Art in Australia Ltd, Sydney (1928) – decorated by Adrian Feint
- The Sunshine Family: A Book of Nonsense for Girls and Boys (1923) – with Ethel Turner

== Sources ==
- Ethel's Daughter: The writings of Jean Curlewis
- Australian Dictionary of Biography
- Pittwater Online News
