= Ethel Turner =

Australian writer

Ethel Mary Turner
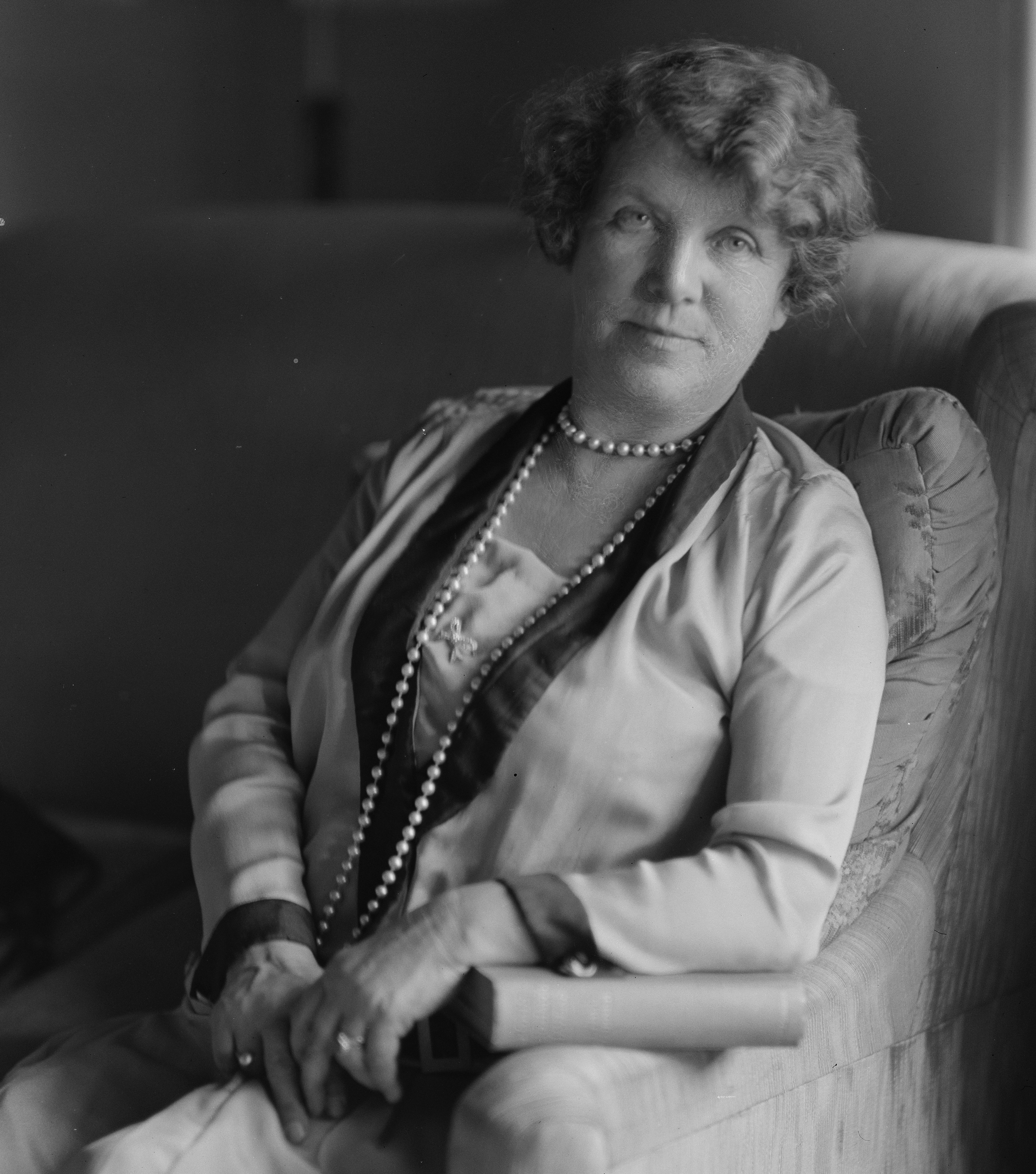
- Ethel Turner, 1928, by Harold Cazneaux
- Born: Ethel Sibyl Burwell; 24 January 1870; Doncaster, England
- Died: 8 April 1958 (aged 88); Mosman, Sydney
- Education: Paddington Public School; Sydney Girls High School
- Occupation: Writer
- Spouse: Herbert Raine Curlewis (m. 22 April 1896)
- Children: Jean Curlewis (1898–1930); Sir Adrian Curlewis (1901–1985)
- Parents: Bennett George Burwell ( ~1875); Sarah Jane Burwell (née O'Brien)

Signature
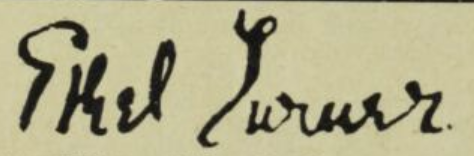

Ethel Turner (24 January 1870 – 8 April 1958) was an English-born Australian novelist and children's literature writer.

== Life ==
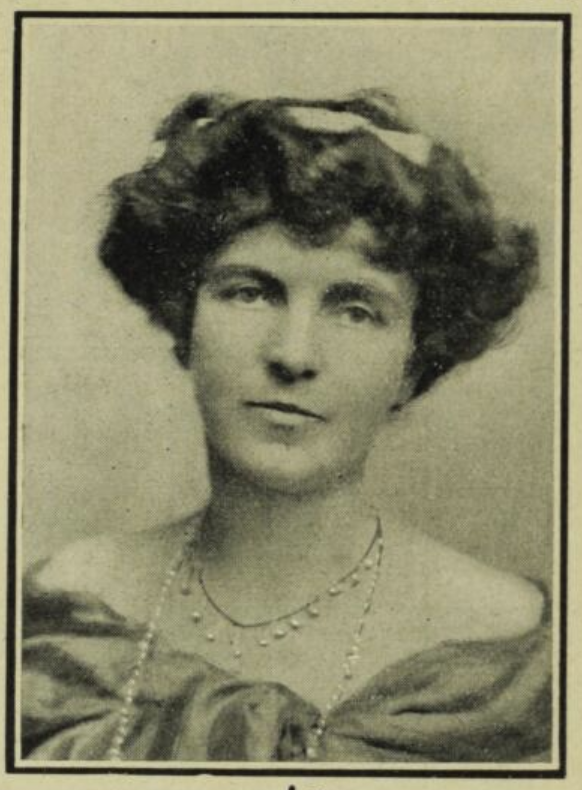
Ethel Turner 1912

She was born Ethel Mary Burwell in Doncaster in England. Her father died when she was two, leaving her mother Sarah Jane Burwell with two daughters (Ethel and Lillian). A year later, Sarah Jane married Henry Turner, who was 20 years older and had six children of his own. Sarah Jane and Henry had a daughter, Rose. Henry Turner died suddenly, leaving Sarah Jane with nine children and little income. In 1879 Sarah Jane moved to Australia with Ethel, Lillian, and Rose; within the next two years she married Charles Cope and gave birth to his son Rex.

Turner was educated at Paddington, New South Wales Public School and Sydney Girls High School—she was one of the school's original thirty-seven pupils.

She started her writing career at eighteen, founding the Parthenon, a journal for young people, with her sister Lillian. As 'Dame Durden' she wrote children's columns for the Illustrated Sydney News and later for the Australian Town and Country Journal. In 1891, the family moved to Inglewood (now known as Woodlands), a large house in Lindfield, now Killara, which was then out in the country. Woodlands still stands today in Werona Avenue and is where she wrote Seven Little Australians.

In 1896 Ethel married Herbert Curlewis, a lawyer. After living in Mosman, they built their own house overlooking Middle Harbour. The house, Avenel, is where Turner spent the rest of her years. She survived her daughter Jean Curlewis, who died of tuberculosis, by 28 years. Jean was also a writer of children's books, although not as popular as her mother. Jean's works include The Ship That Never Set Sail, Drowning Maze, and Beach Beyond (1923). Her son Adrian was a barrister, captain in WW2 and a Changi and Thai-Burma Railway POW and later judge.

Turner died at Mosman on 8 April 1958 at 85. She is buried at Macquarie Park Cemetery in Sydney's North.

== Career ==
Her best-known work is her first novel, Seven Little Australians (1894), which is widely considered a classic of Australian children's literature and was an instant hit both in Australia and overseas. It is about a family of seven children growing up in Australia. The book, together with its sequels The Family at Misrule (1895) and Little Mother Meg (1902) deal with the lives of the Woolcot family, particularly with its seven mischievous and rebellious children, in 1880s Australia. A companion to "Seven Little Australians", Judy and Punch was published in 1928. Like her stepfather, the character of Captain Woolcot was a widower with six children. The book was made into a feature film in Australia in 1939 and a UK television series in 1953. A 10-episode television series was made in 1973 by the Australian Broadcasting Corporation.

Turner published a number of other books for children, short stories and poems. Three Little Maids (1900) is a strongly autobiographical novel about her family's migration from England to Sydney, Australia. Turner wrote more than forty novels. Some were about the mischievous Woolcots. Others were serialized, like her books on "the Cub", and some were stand-alone. The children she wrote about were all adventurous and independent. They frequently got themselves into sticky situations and got themselves out of them with very little to no adult help.

== Awards and honours ==
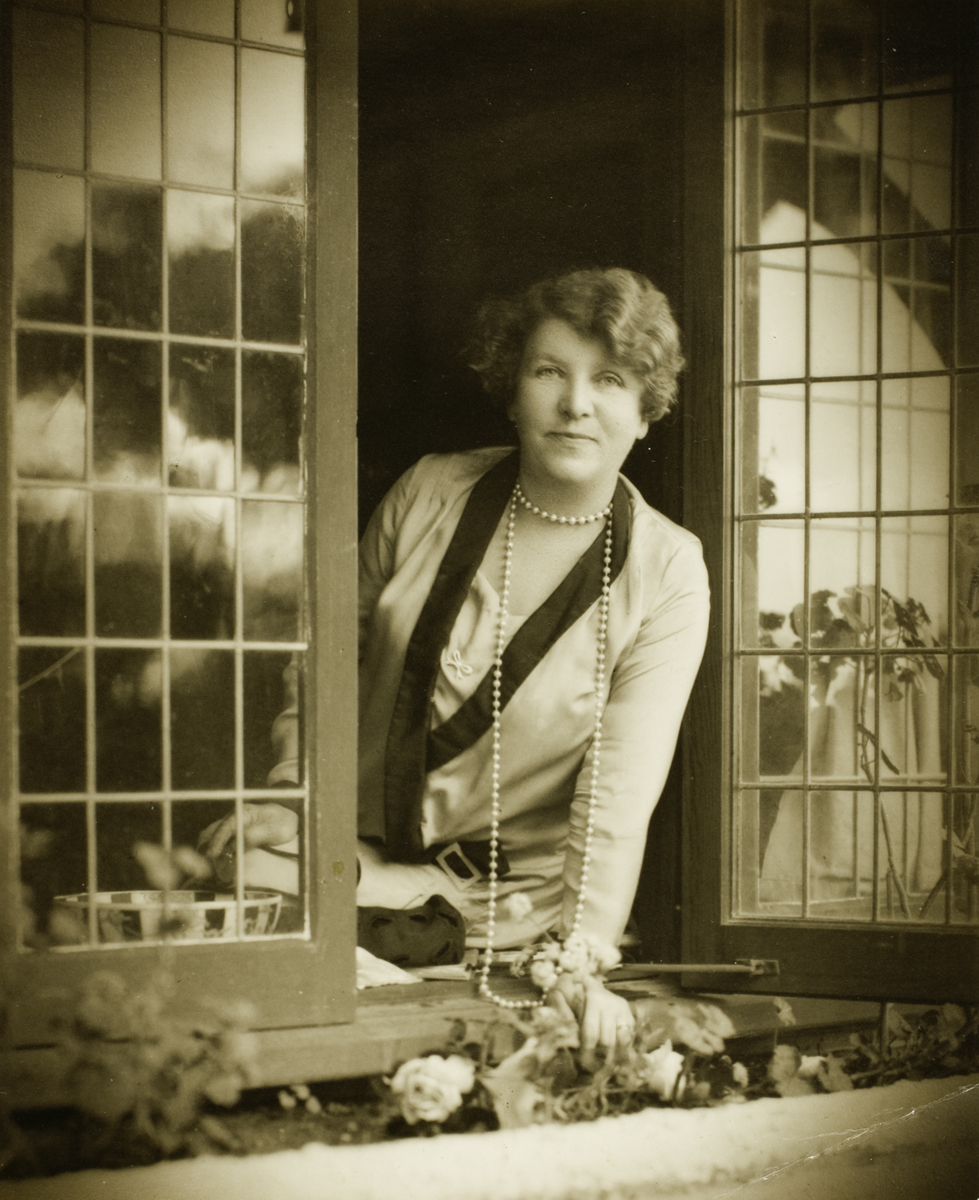
Cazneaux's portrait of Ethel Turner posing in the window of her study at her Mosman home, ‘Avenel’, 1928

Turner was awarded a number of prestigious literary awards and could be considered one of Australia's best-loved authors. She is listed on The Australian Women's Register. The Ethel Turner Prize for Young People's Literature is given annually under the auspices of the New South Wales Premier's Literary Awards.

Curlewis Crescent in the Canberra suburb of Garran is named in her honour and also for her husband.

In 2020, a river-class ferry on the Sydney Ferries network was named in her honour.

== Works ==
- Seven Little Australians (1894)
- The Family at Misrule (1895)
- Story of a Baby (1895)
- The Little Larrikin (1896)
- Miss Bobbie (1897)
- Camp at Wandining (1898)
- Gum Leaves (1900)
- Three Little Maids (1900)
- Wonder Child (1901)
- Little Mother Meg (1902)
- Raft in the Bush (1902)
- Betty & Co (1903)
- Mothers Little Girl (1904)
- White Roofed Tree (1905)
- In the Mist of the Mountains (1906)
- Walking to School (1907)
- Stolen Voyage (1907)
- Happy Hearts (1908)
- That Girl (1908)
- Birthday Book (1909)
- Fugitives from Fortune (1909)
- Fair Ines (1910)
- An Orge up to Date (1911)
- Apple of Happiness (1911)
- Fifteen & Fair (1911)
- Ports & Happy Havens (1911)
- Tiny House (1911)
- Secret of the Sea (1913)
- Flower O' the Pine (1914)
- The Cub (1915)
- John of Daunt (1916)
- Captain Cub (1917)
- St Tom & The Dragon (1918)
- Brigid & the Cub (1919)
- Laughing Water (1920)
- King Anne (1921)
- Jennifer, J. (1922)
- Sunshine Family (1923) (with Jean Curlewis, her daughter)
- Nicola Silver (1924)
- Ungardeners (1925)
- Funny (1926)
- Judy & Punch (1928)

=== Short stories ===
- "Widening the Horizon" appeared in the Argosy, July 1931.
- "The Death Ride", a short story, was in a mystery anthology, Murder Pie, published by Angus and Robertson in 1936.
