= Seven Little Australians =

Book by Ethel Turner

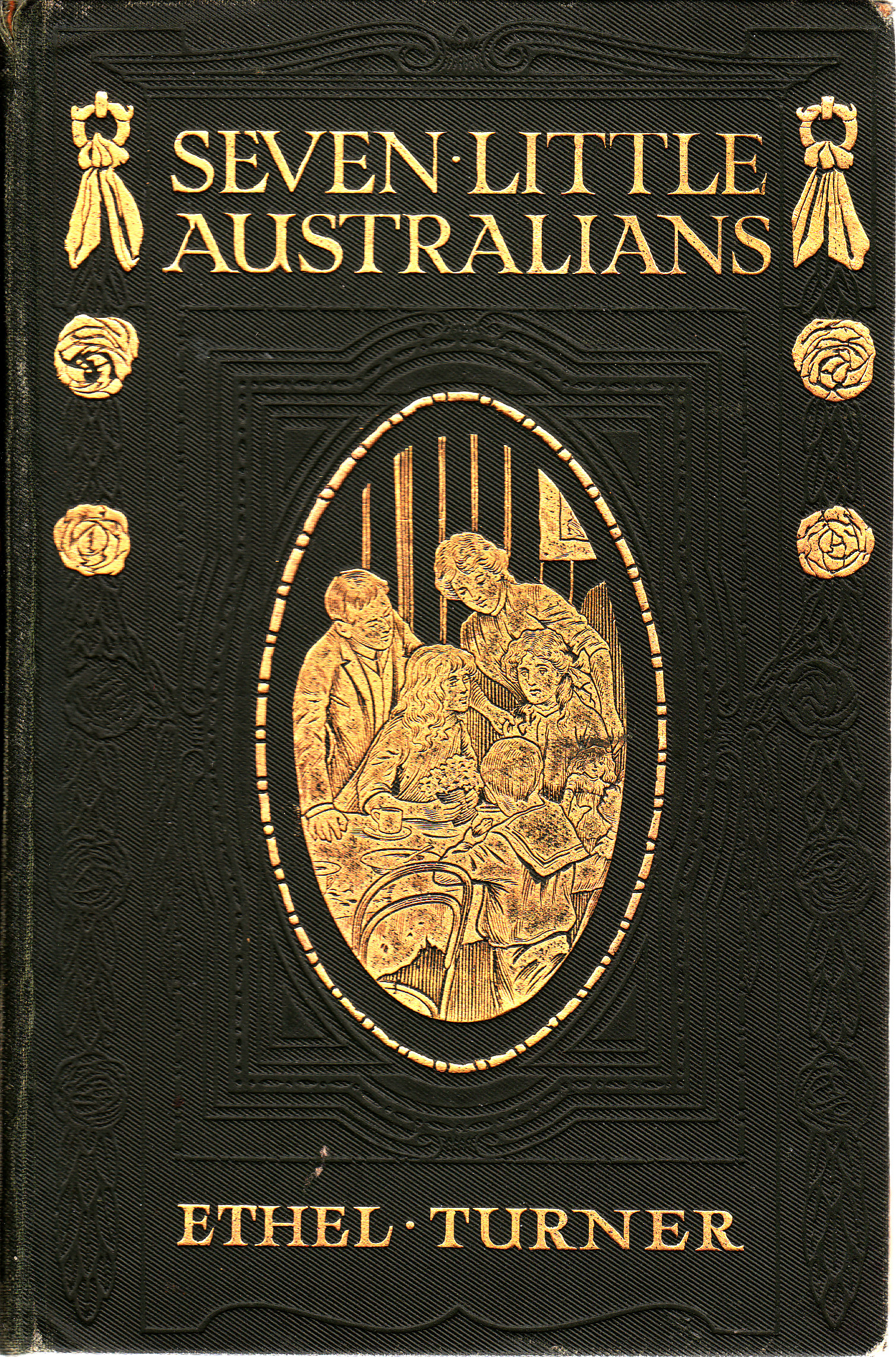
- Cover of the 16th edition, 1912, publisher Ward Lock & Co, illustrations by J. Macfarlane
- Author: Ethel Turner
- Language: English
- Genre: Children's literature
- Publisher: Ward, Lock and Bowden
- Publication date: 1894
- Publication place: Australia
- Media type: Print (hard~ & paperback)
- Pages: 240 pp
- ISBN: 0-554-31409-6
- Followed by: The Family at Misrule

Seven Little Australians is a classic Australian children's literature novel by Ethel Turner, published in 1894. Set mainly in Sydney in the 1880s, it relates the adventures of the seven mischievous Woolcot children, their stern army father Captain Woolcot, and faithful young stepmother Esther.

Turner wrote the novel in 1893 while living at Inglewood in what was then rural Lindfield (now Woodlands, Killara, New South Wales), having moved there from the inner city suburb of Paddington in 1891. The suburban bushland surroundings quickly became important in Turner's stories. On her 21st birthday, Ethel wrote in her diary, 'Seven L. Aust. – sketched it out.' (24 January 1893) In 1994, the novel was the only book by an Australian author to have been continuously in print for 100 years. The book's original handwritten manuscript is held by the State Library of NSW. The full text of the manuscript has been digitized and can be viewed on the Library's website. The original title of the novel, as written by Turner, was 'Seven Pickles'.

It has been extensively adapted for other media, including as a film, two different television mini-series, various stage plays and a stage musical.

== Characters ==
The book's protagonists are the seven Woolcot children, from oldest to youngest:

- Meg (real name Margaret), 16: naive, romantic, eldest (but immature) sister and sometime surrogate mother to the younger children.
- Pip (real name Philip), 14: eldest brother, handsome, intelligent but badly-behaved.
- Judy (real name Helen), 13: imaginative and lively, Pip's partner-in-crime, often leads the others into mischief.
- Nell (real name Elinor), 10: beautiful, slightly wistful child.
- Bunty (real name John), 6: described as 'fat and very lazy'. Bunty can be selfish and annoying but loves his family.
- Baby (real name Winifred), 4: the most well-behaved of the lot, was only a baby when her mother died.
- 'The General' (real name Francis Rupert Burnand), the baby; only natural child of Esther, who is stepmother to the other children.

== Plot summary ==
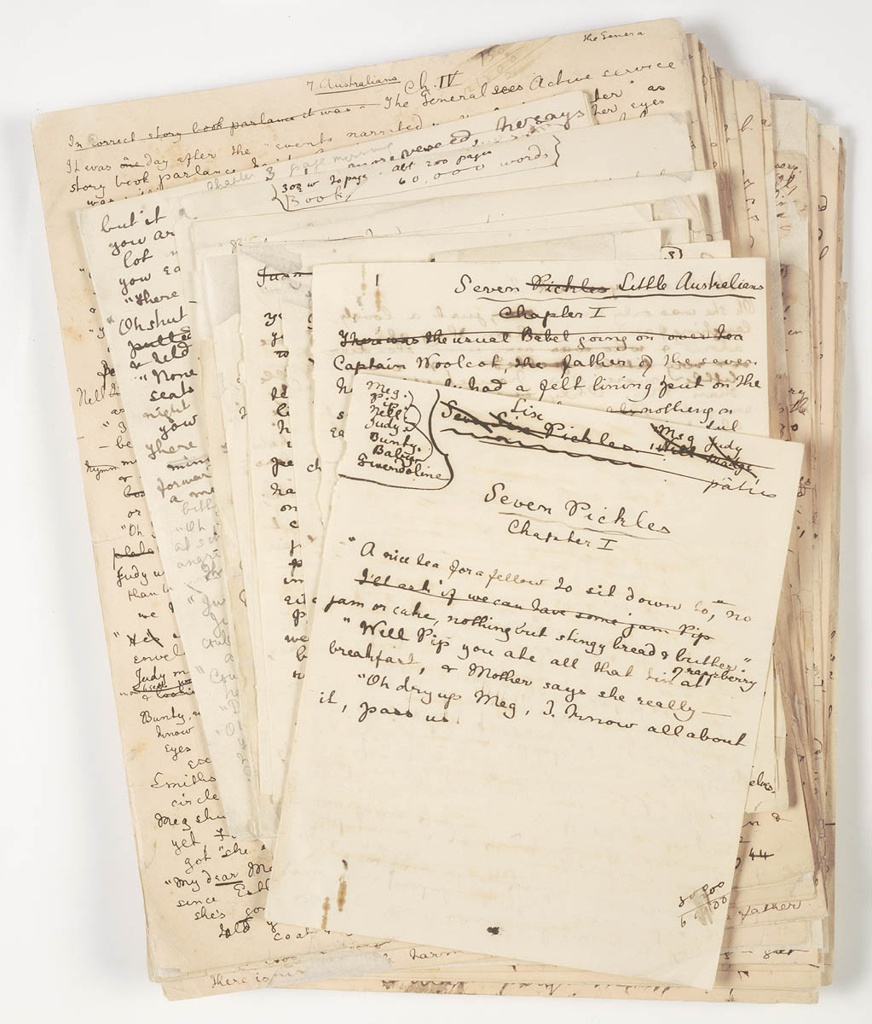
Manuscript version of 'Seven Little Australians' by Ethel Turner.

The seven children of the title live in 1880s Sydney with their father, an army Captain who has little understanding of his children, and their 20-year-old stepmother Esther, who can exert little discipline on them. Accordingly, they wreak havoc wherever possible, for example by interrupting their parents while they entertain guests and asking for some of their dinner (implying to the guests that the children's own dinner is inadequate).

After a prank by Judy and Pip embarrasses Captain Woolcot at his military barracks, he orders that ringleader Judy be sent away to boarding school in the Blue Mountains.

Meg comes under the influence of an older girl, Aldith, and tries to improve her appearance according to the fashions of the day. She and Aldith make the acquaintance of two young men, but Meg believes she has fallen in love with the older brother of one, Alan. When Aldith and Meg arrange to meet the young men for a walk, Meg is embarrassed after a note goes astray and Alan comes to the meeting instead and reproaches her for becoming 'spoilt', rather than remaining the sweet young girl she was. Meg returns home and later faints, having tight-laced her waist under pressure from Aldith until it affects her health.

Unhappy at being away from her siblings, Judy runs away from school, returns home, and hides in the barn. Despite her ill-health as a result of walking for a week to get home, the other children conceal her presence from their father, but that presence is disclosed after he cruelly whips one of them. He plans to send her back to school, but softens in fear when he sees her coughing up blood. When the doctor reports she has pneumonia and is at risk of tuberculosis, she is allowed to remain at home.

To assist Judy's recuperation, Esther's parents invite her and the children to their sheep station Yarrahappini, where Meg becomes intimately acquainted with Gillet, an assistant at Yarrahappini, who is a ruined English aristocrat and alcoholic. This verges upon romance, until Gillet goes on a drinking spree, disgusting Meg. At a picnic soon afterward, however, the two reconcile after Gillet has told the story of his sister, who spurned him and refused to help him when he became dissopated, and telling Meg he does not wish her to succumb to "hardness" as well.

One day the children go on a picnic far away from the property's main house. A ringbarked tree falls and threatens to crush 'the General', the youngest sibling and Esther's own child. Judy, who promised 'on her life' not to allow him to be harmed on the picnic, rushes to catch him and her body protects him from the tree. However her back is broken and she dies before help can be fetched.

After burying Judy on the property, the family returns home to Sydney sobered by her death. While ostensibly things remain the same, each character is slightly changed by their experience. In particular Captain Woolcot regrets the fact that he never really understood Judy. His remaining children are now 'dearer to his heart', though he shows it very little more than before.

== 1894 edition: Tettawonga's Lost Story ==
There is an Aboriginal narrative of significant interest in the original edition that was omitted in all editions from its first republication in 1897 until its centenary edition in 1994.

The Woolcot children, while holidaying at the cattle station, listen to Mr Gillet telling an Aboriginal story he "got at second-hand" from Tettawonga, the station's Aboriginal stockman.

"'Once upon a time' (Judy sniffed at the old-fashioned beginning), 'once upon a time,' said Mr. Gillet, 'when this young land was still younger, and incomparably more beautiful, when Tettawonga's ancestors were brave and strong and happy as careless children, when their worst nightmare had never shown them so evil a time as the white man would bring their race, when--' 'Oh, get on! muttered Pip impatiently. 'Well,' said Mr Gillet, 'when, in short, an early Golden Age wrapped the land in its sunshine, a young kukuburra and its mate spread their wings and set off towards the purple mountains beyond the gum trees..."

These lines are an excerpt from the omitted section, which amounts to about three pages of text in most editions.

Clare Bradford suggested in her book Reading Race "The main effect of the omission of Tettawonga's story is...to achieve a less problematic version of the Australian past than the one which prevails in the book's first edition." Brenda Niall has suggested that the omission may have been due to the extensive advertising in the first reprint, with the commercial editors capitalising on the book's success by removing a digression from the narrative that was considered expendable, and replacing it with advertising space they could sell.

== Follow-up books ==
Ethel Turner wrote three more books featuring the Woolcot family.

- The Family at Misrule tells the story of the family five years on, including new baby girl Esther.
- Judy and Punch describes Judy's experiences at boarding school, including meeting a boy named Punch while they are both on the train to school.
- Little Mother Meg describes Meg becoming a mother and raising her own children; and Peter (the General) and Essie (baby Esther) going on an adventure when they explore their neighbours' garden through a hole in the fence.

== Adaptations ==
The book was adapted as a stage play in 1914 by Beaumont Smith.

The first film adaptation of this novel was made in 1939, directed by Arthur Greville Collins. The film was shot in Sydney at the Commonwealth Film Laboratories and around Camden, New South Wales.

This was followed in 1953 by a BBC Television 6-part miniseries.

In 1973, the book was made into the 10-episode television series Seven Little Australians by Australia's ABC Television with Leonard Teale as Captain Woolcot. This adaption was largely faithful to the book, though differences include the fact that Judy was thin and waiflike in the book, whereas she is more solidly built in the series, and Meg's hair was long and dark, whereas in the book her hair is long and blonde.

A musical theatre adaptation ran in Melbourne and Sydney from 1988. It is now a popular production for local musical societies and high schools to perform.

An acclaimed site-specific stage adaptation by playwright Julia Britton and directed by Robert Chuter was produced at the historic National Trust property Rippon Lea between 26 December 1997 and 26 January 1998.

A new play in two acts was written by Anne Scott-Pendlebury. It was directed by C.A Duff, produced by the Wangaratta Players Inc and premiered at the Wangaratta Performing Arts Centre as part of the WPAC Opening Festival and Wangaratta City Golden Jubilee Celebrations. This production also featured musical interludes of Miriam Hyde's music played by local children.

== Chapter list ==
1. Chiefly Descriptive
2. Fowl for Dinner
3. Virtue Not Always Rewarded
4. The General Sees Active Service
5. "Next Monday Morning"
6. The Sweetness of Sweet Sixteen
7. "What Say You to Falling in Love?"
8. A Catapult and a Catastrophe
9. Consequences
10. Bunty in the Light of a Hero
11. The Truant
12. Swish, Swish!
13. At Thy Last
14. Uninvited Guests
15. The Squatter's Invitation
16. Three Hundred Miles in the Train
17. Yarrahappini
18. Cattle-Drafting at Yarrahappini
19. The Picnic at Krangi-Bahtoo
20. A Pale-Blue Hair Ribbon
21. Little Judy
22. When the Sun Went Down
23. And Last

== Audiobook adaptations ==
- "Seven Little Australians" (2009 Audio Book) Published by Kalliope Audiobooks, narrated by Drew deCarvalho, directed by Roy Yokelson of Antland Productions
- "Seven Little Australians" (2009 digital talking book) DAISY digital talking book produced by the Association for the Blind of Western Australia

== See also ==
- The Seven Little Australians Park is named for the book and is located in Lindfield, New South Wales.
- Manuscript of 'Seven Little Australians', 1893, by Ethel Turner, State Library of New South Wales, SAFE/MLMSS 7019
