= Herbert Curlewis =

Australian judge and writer

His Honour Judge H R Curlewis
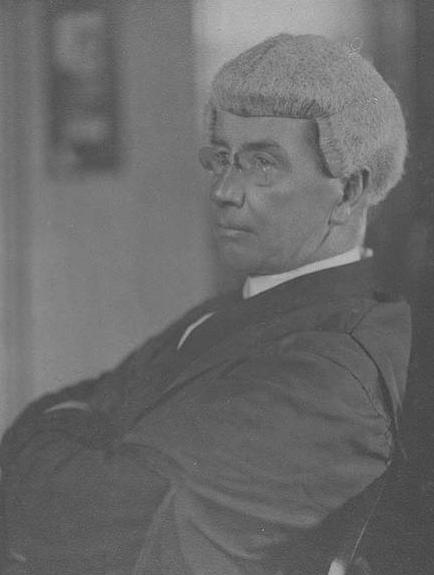
- Born: Herbert Raine Curlewis; 22 August 1869; Bondi, New South Wales
- Died: 11 October 1942 (aged 73); Mosman, New South Wales
- Education: Newington College; University of Sydney
- Occupations: Barrister; Judge
- Spouse(s): Ethel Turner; Married 22 April 1896
- Children: 1 daughter Jean Curlewis (1898-1930); 1 son Sir Adrian Curlewis (1901-1985)
- Parent(s): Frederick Charles Curlewis; Georgina Sophia (née O'Brien)

Herbert Raine Curlewis (22 August 1869 – 11 October 1942) was an Australian judge and writer.

== Early life and education ==
Curlewis was born in Bondi, New South Wales and was the eldest son of Frederick Charles Curlewis, a brickmaster, and his wife Georgina Sophia, née O'Brien. He attended Newington College commencing in 1881. In 1885 and again in 1886, he won the Wigram Allen Scholarship, endowed by Sir George Wigram Allen, for Classics. At the end of 1886 Curlewis was named Dux of the college and received the Schofield Scholarship. He went up to the University of Sydney and in 1890 graduated as a Bachelor of Arts and in 1892 LL.B. He later lectured in law at the university.

== Marriage and family ==
On 22 April 1896 he married Ethel Turner, the author of Seven Little Australians and they had two children, Jean and Adrian (later Sir Adrian).

== Publications ==
As a student Curlewis showed literary talent and in 1906 he wrote The Mirror of Justice, a layman's introduction to the legal process. He was also editor of the Australasian Annual Digest. Other publications held by the National Library of Australia include:

- Comparative tables showing the English laws and statutes in force in New South Wales, and the English statutes corresponding to New South Wales enactments (Sydney: 1904) Law Book Company of Australasia
- Pleading at common law in New South Wales : being notes of lectures delivered in the Law School of the University of Sydney / by Herbert Curlewis revised by David Edwards (Sydney: 1921) Law School of the University of Sydney, 1921
- Procedure at common law and in the inferior courts: being notes of lectures delivered in the Law School of the University of Sydney / by Herbert Curlewis revised by David Edwards (Sydney: 1929) Published for the Law School of the University of Sydney
- Introduction to the law of evidence (Sydney: 1940) University of Sydney

== Legal career ==
He was admitted to the Bar in 1893 and practised in common law. In 1917 he was appointed an additional judge of the Court of Industrial Arbitration of New South Wales. Following the abolition of that court in 1926, he was appointed a judge of the NSW District Court in 1928. Curlewis retired in 1939 and died in 1942.

Awards
Preceded by Harry Wolstenholme	Schofield Scholarship; Dux of Newington College; 1886	Succeeded by William Parker
