= 1896 in Australian literature =

This article presents a list of the historical events and publications of Australian literature during 1896.

== Books ==
- Guy Boothby
  - The Beautiful White Devil
  - Doctor Nikola
- E. W. Hornung – The Rogue's March: A Romance
- Fergus Hume – The Expedition of Captain Flick
- Louise Mack – The World is Round
- Ethel Turner – The Little Larrikin

== Short stories ==
- Barbara Baynton – "The Tramp" (a.k.a. "The Chosen Vessel")
- Ada Cambridge – "The Wind of Destiny"
- Albert Dorrington – "A Bush Tanqueray"
- Edward Dyson
  - "The Elopement of Mrs Peters"
  - "Spicer's Courtship"
- Henry Lawson
  - "Black Joe"
  - "The Geological Spieler"
  - While the Billy Boils
- K. Langloh Parker – Australian Legendary Tales (edited)
- A. B. Paterson – "White-When-He's-Wanted"
- Steele Rudd – "Dad and the Two Donovans"
- Ethel Turner – The Little Duchess and Other Stories

== Poetry ==
- Christopher Brennan – "Towards the Source : 1894-97 : I : 10" (a.k.a. "The Yellow Gas")
- Victor J. Daley – "Day and Night"
- Edward Dyson
  - "Peter Simson's Farm"
  - Rhymes from the Mines and Other Lines
- Ernest Favenc – "The Watchers"
- Henry Lawson
  - In the Days When the World was Wide and Other Verses
  - "Past Carin'"
  - "The Star of Australasia"
- A. B. Paterson
  - "Hay and Hell and Booligal"
  - "Mulga Bill's Bicycle"
  - "Pioneers"
  - "Rio Grande's Last Race"
  - "Song of the Artesian Water"
- J. Le Gay Brereton – The Song of Brotherhood, and Other Verses

== Drama ==
- Reg Rede – The Kelly Gang

== Biography ==
- Henry Parkes – An Emigrant's Home Letters

== Births ==
A list, ordered by date of birth (and, if the date is either unspecified or repeated, ordered alphabetically by surname) of births in 1896 of Australian literary figures, authors of written works or literature-related individuals follows, including year of death.

- 20 March – Cecil Mann, editor and critic (died 1967)
- 3 April – Ronald Campbell, novelist and short story writer (died 1970)
- 16 November – Joan Lindsay, novelist (died 1984)

== Deaths ==
A list, ordered by date of death (and, if the date is either unspecified or repeated, ordered alphabetically by surname) of deaths in 1896 of Australian literary figures, authors of written works or literature-related individuals follows, including year of birth.

- 27 April – Henry Parkes, poet and politician (born 1815)
- 27 December – Henry Clay, poet (born 1844)

== See also ==
- 1896 in Australia
- 1896 in literature
- 1896 in poetry
- List of years in Australian literature
- List of years in literature
