= 1896 in poetry =

If you can talk with crowds and keep your virtue,

Or walk with Kings—nor lose the common touch,
If neither foes nor loving friends can hurt you,
If all men count with you, but none too much:
If you can fill the unforgiving minute
With sixty seconds’ worth of distance run,
Yours is the Earth and everything that’s in it,

And—which is more—you’ll be a Man, my son!

— closing lines of Rudyard Kipling's If—, first published this year

Nationality words link to articles with information on the nation's poetry or literature (for instance, Irish or France).

== Events ==
- July 7 – Charles Thomas Wooldridge is hanged at Reading Gaol in England for uxoricide, inspiring fellow-prisoner C.3.3. Oscar Wilde's The Ballad of Reading Gaol (1897).
- William Morris publishes the Kelmscott Press edition of Chaucer's works

== Works published in English ==
=== Australia ===
- John Le Gay Brereton:
  - Perdita, A Sonnet Record
  - The Song of Brotherhood and Other Verses
- Edward Dyson, Rhymes from the Mines and Other Lines
- Henry Lawson:
  - In the Days When the World was Wide and Other Verses
  - "The Teams"
- Banjo Paterson:
  - The Man from Snowy River
  - "Mulga Bill's Bicycle"

=== Canada ===
- Bliss Carman, with Richard Hovey, More Songs from Vagabondia, Canadian author published in the United States
- Charles G. D. Roberts, The Book of the Native
- Charles Sangster, Our Norland. Toronto: Copp Clark, n.d.
- Duncan Campbell Scott, In the Village of Viger, Canada
- Francis Sherman
  - In Memorabilia Mortis. Boston: Copeland and Day.
  - Matins. Boston: Copeland and Day.

=== United Kingdom ===
To an Athlete Dying Young
by A. E. Housman

Smart lad, to slip betimes away
From fields where glory does not stay
And early though the laurel grows
It withers quicker than the rose.

Eyes the shady night has shut
Cannot see the record cut,
And silence sounds no worse than cheers
After earth has stopped the ears:
-- Lines 9-16

- Hilaire Belloc:
  - The Bad Child's Book of Beasts
  - Verses and Sonnets
- Laurence Binyon, First Book of London Visions (see also Second Book of London Visions 1899)
- Mary Elizabeth Coleridge, publishing under the pen name "Anodos", Fancy's Following (see also Fancy's Guerdon 1897)
- Lord Alfred Douglas, Poems
- Ernest Dowson, Verses, including "Non Sum Qualis Eram"
- A. E. Housman, A Shropshire Lad, including "To an Athlete Dying Young", "Loveliest of Trees, the Cherry Now" and "When I Was One-and-Twenty"
- Laurence Housman, Green Arras
- Rudyard Kipling, The Seven Seas
- Alice Meynell, Other Poems
- Henry Newbolt, "Drake's Drum", published in the St. John's Gazette (first published in book form in Admirals All, and Other Verses 1897)
- John Cowper Powys, Odes, and Other Poems
- Arthur Quiller-Couch, Poems and Ballads
- Christina Rossetti, New Poems, edited by W. M. Rossetti
- Robert Louis Stevenson, Songs of Travel, and Other Verses
- Algernon Charles Swinburne, The Tale of Balen
- William Watson, The Purple East

=== United States ===
- Thomas Bailey Aldrich:
  - Judith and Holofernes
  - Later Lyrics
- Bliss Carman, with Richard Hovey, More Songs from Vagabondia, Canadian author published in the United States
- Jennie Thornley Clarke, Songs of the South
- Emily Dickinson, Poems: Third Series
- Paul Laurence Dunbar
  - Lyrics of Lowly Life
  - Majors and Minors
  - "We Wear the Mask"
- Lizette Woodworth Reese, A Quiet Road
- Edwin Arlington Robinson, The Torrent and the Night Before

== Works published in other languages ==
- Nérée Beauchemin, Les floraisons matutinales; the author's first published collection; French language; Trois-Rivières, Canada
- José Santos Chocano, Azahares, Peru
- Richard Dehmel, Weib und Welt ("Woman and World"), German
- Narasinghrao, Hridayaveena containing khandakavyas, garbis (religious, ethical and romantic lyrics), and poems about nature and women (Indian, writing in Gujarati)
- Tekkan Yosano, Tozai namboku ("East-west, north-south"), tanka poetry, Japan

== Awards and honors ==
- Alfred Austin made Poet Laureate

== Births ==
Death years link to the corresponding "[year] in poetry" article:

- January 26 – Walter D'Arcy Cresswell (died 1960), New Zealand
- February 26 – Andrei Zhdanov (died 1948), a Soviet official who persecuted poets, writers and artists under the Zhdanov doctrine
- May 9 – Austin Clarke (died 1974), Irish poet, playwright and judge
- August 27 – Kenji Miyazawa 宮沢 賢治 (died 1933), Japanese, early Shōwa period poet and author of children's literature (surname: Miyazawa)
- September 22 – Uri Zvi Grinberg (died 1981), Jewish
- October 12 – Eugenio Montale (died 1981), Italian
- October 30 – Kostas Karyotakis (died 1928), Greek
- December 1 – Teiko Tomita (died 1990), Japanese-born American poet who wrote in Japanese

== Deaths ==
Birth years link to the corresponding "[year] in poetry" article:

- January 8 – Paul Verlaine (born 1844), French
- March 20 – Alexander McLachlan (born 1818), Scottish-born Canadian
- March 21 – Elizabeth Otis Dannelly (born 1838), American writer of Southern poetry
- May 11 – Henry Cuyler Bunner (born 1855), American novelist and poet
- October 3 – William Morris (born 1834), English poet, writer, designer and socialist
- October 29 – Thomas Edward Brown (born 1830), Manx poet writing in English
- November 26
  - Mathilde Blind (born 1841), German-born British poet writing in English
  - Coventry Patmore (born 1823), English

== See also ==
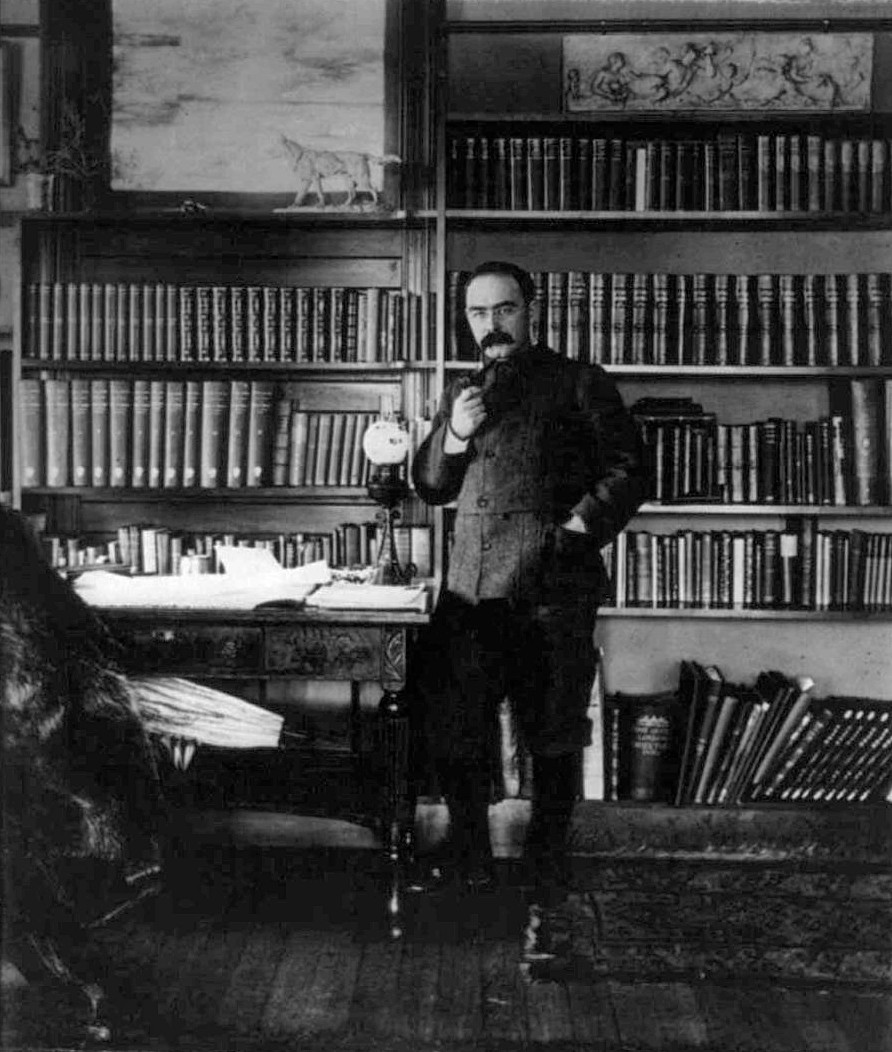
Rudyard Kipling in his study, about this year

- 19th century in poetry
- 19th century in literature
- List of years in poetry
- List of years in literature
- Victorian literature
- French literature of the 19th century
- Symbolist poetry
- Young Poland (Młoda Polska) a modernist period in Polish arts and literature, roughly from 1890 to 1918
- Poetry
