= Cleaning Up =

Cleaning Up may refer to:

- "Cleaning Up" (poem), an 1892 poem by Edward Dyson
- Cleaning Up (1925 film), an American comedy film directed by Fatty Arbuckle
- Cleaning Up (1933 film), a British comedy film
- Cleaning Up (British TV series), a 2019 British television drama series
- Cleaning Up (South Korean TV series), a 2022 South Korean TV series
- "Cleaning Up" (Slow Horses), a 2023 TV episode
- "Cleaning Up" (The Wire), a 2002 TV episode
- Cleaning Up, a climate change podcast with Baroness Bryony Worthington, Michael Liebreich
