= Rio Grande's Last Race =

1896 poem by Banjo Paterson

- by Andrew Barton "Banjo" Paterson
- Written: 1896
- First published in: The Sketch
- Country: Australia
- Language: English
- Publication date: 16 December 1896

Full text
- Rio Grande's Last Race at Wikisource

Rio Grande's Last Race is a racing poem by Australian writer and poet Andrew Barton "Banjo" Paterson. It was first published in the London Sketch magazine on 16 December 1896. It was later published as the title poem for Paterson's second poetry collection, Rio Grande's Last Race and Other Verses, in 1902.

The poem was one of Paterson's favourites, and its theme of a jockey's premonition of death is unusual for the poet.

== Plot summary ==
Jack Macpherson, the only jockey with the ability and "hands to hold/The rushing Rio Grande", sits in the stands and retells the story of his dream. He dreamt that he was surrounded before the race by horses and riders, all dead, who told him how to ride Rio Grande that day. But the race was to end in tragedy with horse and rider both dying.

== Further publications ==
- Rio Grande's Last Race and Other Verses by Banjo Paterson (1902)
- Favourite Australian Poems edited by Ian Mudie (1963)
- Singer of the Bush, A. B. (Banjo) Paterson : Complete Works 1885-1900 edited by Rosamund Campbell and Philippa Harvie (1983)
- A Vision Splendid : The Complete Poetry of A. B. 'Banjo' Paterson (1990)
- The Best Australian Yarns : And Other True Stories edited by Jim Haynes (2013)

== See also ==
- 1896 in poetry
- 1896 in literature
- 1896 in Australian literature
- 1902 in Australian literature
- Australian literature
