= The World Is Round =

The World Is Round may refer to:

- Spherical Earth, the idea of the world as round shaped
- The World Is Round (novel), an 1896 novel by Louise Mack
- The World Is Round, a play performed in NYC, see Grace McLean
- The World Is Round, a 1978 science fiction novel by Tony Rothman
- "The World Is Round", a 1965 song by American rhythm and blues singer Rufus Thomas
- The World Is Round, a 1939 children's book by Gertrude Stein

== See also ==
- La terre est ronde (disambiguation)
