= Peter Simson's Farm =

Poem by Australian writer Edward Dyson

- by Edward Dyson
- Written: 1896
- First published in: The Argus
- Country: Australia
- Language: English
- Publication date: 22 February 1896

Full text
- Peter Simson's Farm at Wikisource

"Peter Simson's Farm" (1896) is a poem by Australian poet Edward Dyson.

It was originally published in The Argus on 22 February 1896 and subsequently reprinted in a collection of the author's poems, other newspapers and periodicals and a number of Australian poetry anthologies.

== Synopsis ==
The poem tells of the fortunes of Peter Simson as he hacks a farm out of the scrub to make a home for his family. But the arrival of rabbits in the area ruins everything and his once-prosperous farm becomes a wasteland.

== Critical reception ==
While reviewing the poet's collection of poems, Rhymes from the Mines, a reviewer in The Australian Town and Country Journal noted: "Among the 'Other Lines,' those on 'Peter Simson's Farm' and 'The Theoretical Selector' are eloquent of the real conditions of the battle between man and nature, and worthy of the consideration of those who talk lightly of the advantages of 'going upon the land.'"

In a review of The Oxford Book of Australasian Verse edited by Walter Murdoch in The Herald from Melbourne a writer lamented the non-inclusion of some poems. "The more realistic and sinister poetry of the Bush and of the dwellers therein is poorly represented; but this defect is evidently due to copyright restrictions, and would doubtless have been remedied had the editor been able to draw on Boake and Lawson. As it is, we have one forcible and faithful example of the kind in Edward Dyson's 'Peter Simson's Farm'."

== Publication history ==
After the poem's initial publication in The Argus it was reprinted as follows:

- The Morning Bulletin, Rockhampton, 11 March 1896
- Rhymes from the Mines and Other Lines by Edward Dyson, 1896
- The Oxford Book of Australasian Verse edited by Walter Murdoch, 1918
- Old Ballads from the Bush edited by Bill Scott, 1987

== See also ==
- 1896 in Australian literature
- 1896 in poetry
