= Below and On Top =

Short story collection by Edward Dyson

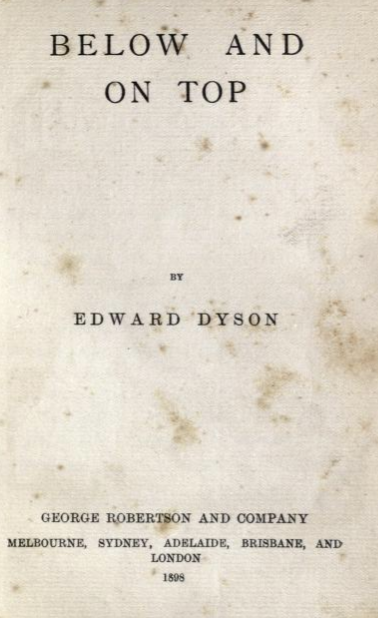
- Title page for Below and On Top (1898)
- Author: Edward Dyson
- Language: English
- Genre: Short story collection
- Publisher: George Robertson
- Publication date: 1898
- Publication place: Australia
- Media type: Print
- Pages: 327 pp
- Preceded by: Rhymes from the Mines and Other Lines
- Followed by: Fact'ry 'ands

Below and On Top (1898) is a collection of short stories by Australian writer Edward Dyson. It was published by George Robertson publishers in 1898.

The collection includes 24 stories by the author, from a variety of original sources; mainly The Bulletin, The Argus, Melbourne Punch, The Antipodean and Cosmos. The title story, "Below and On Top", was published for the first time in this edition.

== Contents ==
- "Of the True Endeavour"
- "Below and On Top"
- "A Sabbath Morn at Waddy"
- "The Trucker's Dream"
- "The Fossickers"
- "At the Yards"
- "A Visit to Scrubby Gully"
- "A Golden Shanty"
- "Hebe of Grasstree"
- "A Zealot in Labour"
- "The Washerwoman of Jacker's Flat"
- "Dead Man's Lode"
- "After the Accident"
- "Mr and Mrs Sin Fat"
- "An Incident at the Old Pioneer"
- "A Vain Sacrifice"
- "Glover's Little Joke"
- "A Child of Nature"
- "The Whim Boy"
- "Spicer's Courtship"
- "The Conquering Bush"
- "The Elopement of Mrs Peters"
- "One Night"
- "His Bad Luck"

== Critical reception ==
A writer in The Herald stated: "Mr Dyson has unquestionably the happy knack of describing in crisp and attractive style the scenes of daily life in the bush and in the township. His pictures are those we see around us every day, and yet through the medium of his pen we can while away many an hour looking at them again."

Writing about the book in a piece in 1954 for The Bulletin magazine Norman Lindsay noted: "Much of the best literature springs from a lack of literary consciousness, and Below and On Top is from that genesis. It was written shortly after Dyson had left the life of a working miner to make a living as a writer...As is inevitable with a young writer, some of the stories in Below and On Top are of unequal quality. If I were making a selection, I would pass the 'Dick Haddon' boy-stories. They generate, I suspect, from Tom Sawyer...The lasting quality of Below and On Top is in the mining stories, headed by 'The Golden Shanty,' which would be a classic in whatever country it was written."

== Publication history ==
After the book's initial publication on Melbourne in 1898 it was not until 2004 that it was reprinted by the Sydney University Press.

== See also ==
- 1898 in Australian literature

== Notes ==
- The first edition was illustrated by artists Phil May (caricaturist), Alf Vincent and Ambrose Dyson.
