= The Golden Shanty (short story) =

1887 short story by Edward Dyson

- Short story by Edward Dyson
- Country: Australia
- Language: English

Publication
- Published in: The Bulletin
- Publication type: Periodical
- Media type: Print
- Publication date: 24 December 1887

"The Golden Shanty" is a humorous short story by Australian writer Edward Dyson. It was first published in the 24 December 1887 issue of The Bulletin, and later included in the author's short story collection, Below and On Top, and in many short story anthologies. It was originally published under the title "The Profitable Pub". It is also known by the title "A Golden Shanty".

== Plot summary ==
The Shamrock Hotel stands on an abandoned goldfield near Ballarat in Victoria. It is owned by Irish-Australian publication Michael Doyle. After some local Chinese fossickers offer him £50 for the building, which he accepts, Doyle discovers that the hotel is made from high-yielding, gold-bearing clay bricks.

== Further publications ==
- A Golden Shanty: Australian Stories and Sketches in Prose and Verse, Bulletin, 1890
- Below and On Top, George Robertson, 1898
- The Golden Shanty, George Robertson, 1911
- Australian Short Stories edited by George Mackaness, J. M. Dent, 1928
- The Bulletin, 1 February 1950
- Favourite Australian Stories edited by Colin Thiele, Rigby, 1963
- The Golden Shanty, Angus and Robertson, 1963
- Short Stories of Australia: The Lawson Tradition edited by Douglas Stewart, Angus and Robertson, 1967
- Best Australian Short Stories edited by Douglas Stewart and Beatrice Davis, Lloyd O' Neill, 1971
- It Could Be You edited by Hal Porter, Rigby, 1972
- The Penguin Best Australian Short Stories edited by Mary Lord, Penguin, 1991
- The Penguin Book of 19th Century Australian Literature edited by Michael Ackland, Penguin, 1993
- From Yellow Earth to Eucalypt: Stories and Poems from China and Australia edited by Neil Whitfield, Longman, 1995

The story was also reprinted in a number of Australian newspapers.

== Critical reception ==
- The Oxford Companion to Australian Literature calls the story "one of Australia's most famous goldfields stories", and then goes on to state: "Despite its humour, 'A Golden Shanty' reflects the hostility that existed between white men and the Chinese on the goldfields.'"

== See also ==
- 1887 in Australian literature
