= The Old Whim Horse =

Poem by Edward Dyson

- by Edward Dyson
- Written: 1892
- First published in: The Bulletin
- Country: Australia
- Language: English
- Publisher: The Bulletin
- Publication date: 30 July 1892

Full text
- The Old Whim Horse at Wikisource

The Old Whim Horse is a poem by Australian writer and poet Edward Dyson. It was first published in The Bulletin magazine on 30 July 1892, and later in the poet's collection Rhymes from the Mines and Other Lines (1896).

== Synopsis ==
The poem details the fate of an old whim horse, no longer shackled to a winch after the mine has played out. The horse is put out to pasture and allowed to grow old and die.

== Analysis ==
In a review of the poem in "The Sunday Mail" (Brisbane), the reviewer describes the poem as follows: "Day after day, week after week, this horse comes along to the whim to work his 'shift' but never can he understand why his friends and his master do not come to work also. Still he hopes and waits patiently for their return. His thoughts are always of them and of the days when they toiled together side by side. But time passes by him swiftly, and gradually, through sadness and his desire to be with his friends again, his reasoning mind drops back into oblivion, and he begins to live in the world of his imagination."

Geoffrey Blainey, in "Days of Gold", his essay on the 150th anniversary of Eureka: "Nearby, a few spectators are patting a whim-horse, a slightly obstinate Clydesdale, about seven years old. He stands beside the whim, where his task is to plod round and round, tugging the rope that lifts materials from the nearby shaft. A few of the older generation are delighted to see him, because in their childhood, Edward Dyson's The Old Whim Horse was one of the most popular poems in the land: He's an old, grey horse, with his head bowed sadly."

Geoffrey Blainey, in his A History of Victoria (2006), stated that Dyson's poem "continued to remind thousands of young Victorians of the faithfulness of the horse in an era when the well-being of every Victorian depended on horsepower."

== See also ==
- 1892 in poetry
- 1892 in literature
- 1892 in Australian literature
- Australian literature

== Notes ==
- A "whim" is "a horse-drawn winch formerly used in mining to lift ore or water".

== Further publications ==
- An Anthology of Australian Verse edited by Bertram Stevens, Angus and Robertson, 1907
- The Golden Treasury of Australian Verse edited by Bertram Stevens, Angus and Robertson, 1909
- Favourite Australian Poems edited by Ian Mudie, Rigby, 1963
- This Land : An Anthology of Australian Poetry for Young People edited by M. M. Flynn and J. Groom, Pergamon Press, 1968
- The Collins Book of Australian Poetry edited by Rodney Hall, Collins, 1981
- The Illustrated Treasury of Australian Verse edited by Beatrice Davis, Nelson, 1984
- A Collection of Australian Bush Verse Peter Antill-Rose, 1989
- Classic Australian Verse edited by Maggie Pinkney, Five Mile Press, 2001
- Two Centuries of Australian Poetry edited by Kathrine Bell, Gary Allen, 2007
- 100 Australian Poems You Need to Know edited by Jamie Grant, Hardie Grant, 2008
