= The Little Larrikin =

1896 novel by Australian writer Ethel Turner

- Author: Ethel Turner
- Language: English
- Genre: Fiction
- Publisher: Ward, Lock & Co.
- Publication date: 1896
- Publication place: England
- Media type: Print
- Pages: 343 pp.
- Preceded by: Story of a Baby
- Followed by: Miss Bobbie

The Little Larrikin (1896) is a novel by Australian writer Ethel Turner. It was originally published by Ward, Lock & Co. in London, England, in 1896.

== Synopsis ==
Laurence (or Lol), the larrikin of the title, is the youngest of a family of male orphans. He is also the head of a small gang of other boys, a "push", that runs riot in an inner suburb of Sydney in the late 1800s.

== Critical reception ==
A reviewer in The Maitland Daily Mercury found some problems with the novel and noted: "This is Ethel Turner's most ambitious work so far; it is much more elaborate than any other of her books; it is not a atory for children or mainly of a child; but, instead of being a well constructed novel for adult reading, it is a series of episodes — doubtless interesting enough in themselves — wanting that bond of unity of intention which is required to make a fictitious tale an artistic success."

The critic in The Leader concurred: "The story is one which will charm many renders, though we cannot agree-with the estimate placed upon it by the author, in ranking it above other works from her pen. It does not possess the same unforced humor and natural delineation of character which distinguish Seven Little Australians and The Family at Misrule. From the language of the preface we may assume that it is a study from life, hut though personal knowledge may have helped to stimulate the imagination of the writer, she has not succeeded fully in conveying to her readers the impression of reality."

== Publication history ==
After its original publication in 1896 in England by publisher Ward, Lock & Co. the novel was later reprinted as follows:

- Ward, Lock & Co., 1896 (twice) and 1897 (twice)
- Ward, Lock & Co., England and Australia, 1914
- Ward, Lock & Co., England, 1920
- Ure Smith, Australia, 1978

The novel was also translated into German in 1922, and Swedish in 1946.

== See also ==
- 1896 in Australian literature
