= Fact'ry 'ands =

1906 short story collection by Edward Dyson

- Author: Edward Dyson
- Illustrator: Will Dyson
- Language: English
- Genre: comedy
- Publisher: George Robertson
- Publication date: 1906
- Publication place: Australia

Fact'ry 'ands is a 1906 collection of Australian short stories by Edward Dyson about people who work in a factory.

The collection comprises 12 short stories, the bulk of which were originally published in The Bulletin magazine.

They were based on Dyson's own experiences of factory work.

== Contents ==
- "Benno's Little Boshter"
- "A Question of Propriety"
- " A Little Love Affair"
- "The Morbid Boy"
- "The Fat Girl"
- "A Hot Day at Spats'"
- "The Man-Eater"
- "The Wooing of Minnie"
- "Levi's Trousers"
- "Spats' Cats"
- "The Packer's 'Little Silly'"

== Critical reception ==
The Sydney Morning Herald wrote "the characters in this interesting and entertaining book are capital company-to road about. We do not know that their conception of humour would be accepted in circles in real life that have any claim to refinement, and indeed' we are strongly tempted to believe that Mr. Dyson has attributed to them much of his own wit. The sketches are brimful of life."

The stories were popular and led to sequels.

== Play version ==
Fact'ry 'ands
- Original language: English
- Genre: comedy

Premiere
- Date: 26 February 1916
- Directed by: Charles Stanford

The stories were adapted into a popular play.

Dyson wrote the original draft of this play but says it was entirely rewritten. The play incorporated a murder plot, as had On Our Selection.

The Sunday Times said " The subtle humorous essence of the books has not been entirely preserved, but sufficient remains to provide a fair share of entertainment."

The Sydney Morning Herald wrote the play "remained "sketchy;" but the low-life characters he [Turner] had created were for the most part sufficiently well-embodied on the stage, and many humorous moments resulted."

"There is evidently a wide public always ready to appreciate Australian comedy," said The Referee.

The play was reviewed in The Bulletin in verse form.
