= Tom Durkin (artist) =

Australian caricaturist and cartoonist

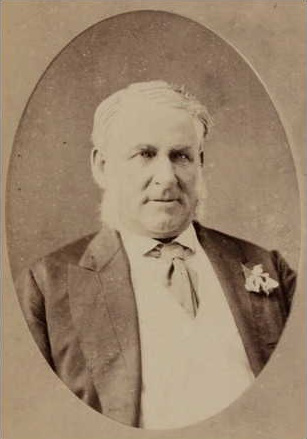
- Born: Thomas Coleman Durkin; 1853; At sea
- Died: 29 April 1902 (aged 48–49); Newport, Melbourne, Australia
- Occupations: Artist, cartoonist, illustrator, caricaturist
- Writing career
- Period: 1870-1900

Signature
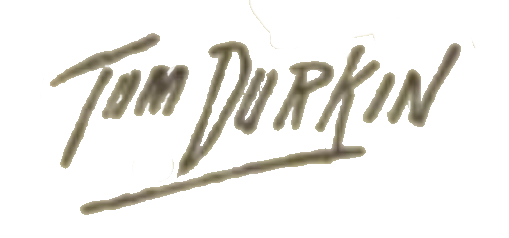

Thomas Coleman Durkin (1853 – 29 April 1902) was an Australian cartoonist and caricaturist based in Melbourne, active in the decades before Federation. He contributed to a variety of newspapers and illustrated journals during the 1870s and 1880s, including a series of caricatures of prominent Victorians published in the Melbourne newspaper, The Weekly Times. Fourteen lithographic prints from this series are now held by the National Portrait Gallery in Canberra. In the early 1890s Durkin was a part-owner with Edward Dyson of the illustrated Bull-Ant newspaper. From 1893 Durkin was employed as the Melbourne cartoonist for the Sydney-based Bulletin magazine, the first Australian-born artist to join its staff. He contributed a regular full-page of Melbourne-themed cartoons and caricatures, as well as smaller format illustrations. Durkin left The Bulletin in 1898, intending to travel to England, but his plans were abandoned through illness. Tom Durkin died of a liver disease in April 1902.

== Early life ==
Thomas Coleman Durkin was the eldest son of Michael Durkin and Jane (née Coleman), born at sea in 1853 aboard the S.S. West Wind in the South Atlantic Ocean south-east of the island of Saint Helena.^{[A]} His parents had departed from New York aboard the West Wind in early September 1852. Michael Durkin was a native of county Sligo in Ireland and Jane was born in the United States; the couple had married in March 1852 at Cincinnati, Ohio. The West Wind arrived at Melbourne in April 1853.^{[B]} Thomas' parents settled in the Williamstown area near Melbourne, on the west side of Hobsons Bay on Port Phillip, where Michael Durkin established a dairy business at Newport.

As a boy Durkin had a passion for sketching. He was "wholly self-taught as an artist".

Durkin trained at the Williamstown School of Design, learning the trade of engraving and die-sinking, after which he was apprenticed to an engraver. When the term of apprenticeship expired he found a job earning adult wages as a journeyman to a leading Melbourne jeweller.

== Career ==
=== Newspaper work ===
Durkin's first published cartoons appeared in The Trumpeter, a local Williamstown newspaper which he co-owned. The Trumpeter was printed in the building later occupied by the Williamstown Chronicle. In the early 1870s Durkin started a "comic paper" named The Tomahawk, which was also printed at Williamstown.

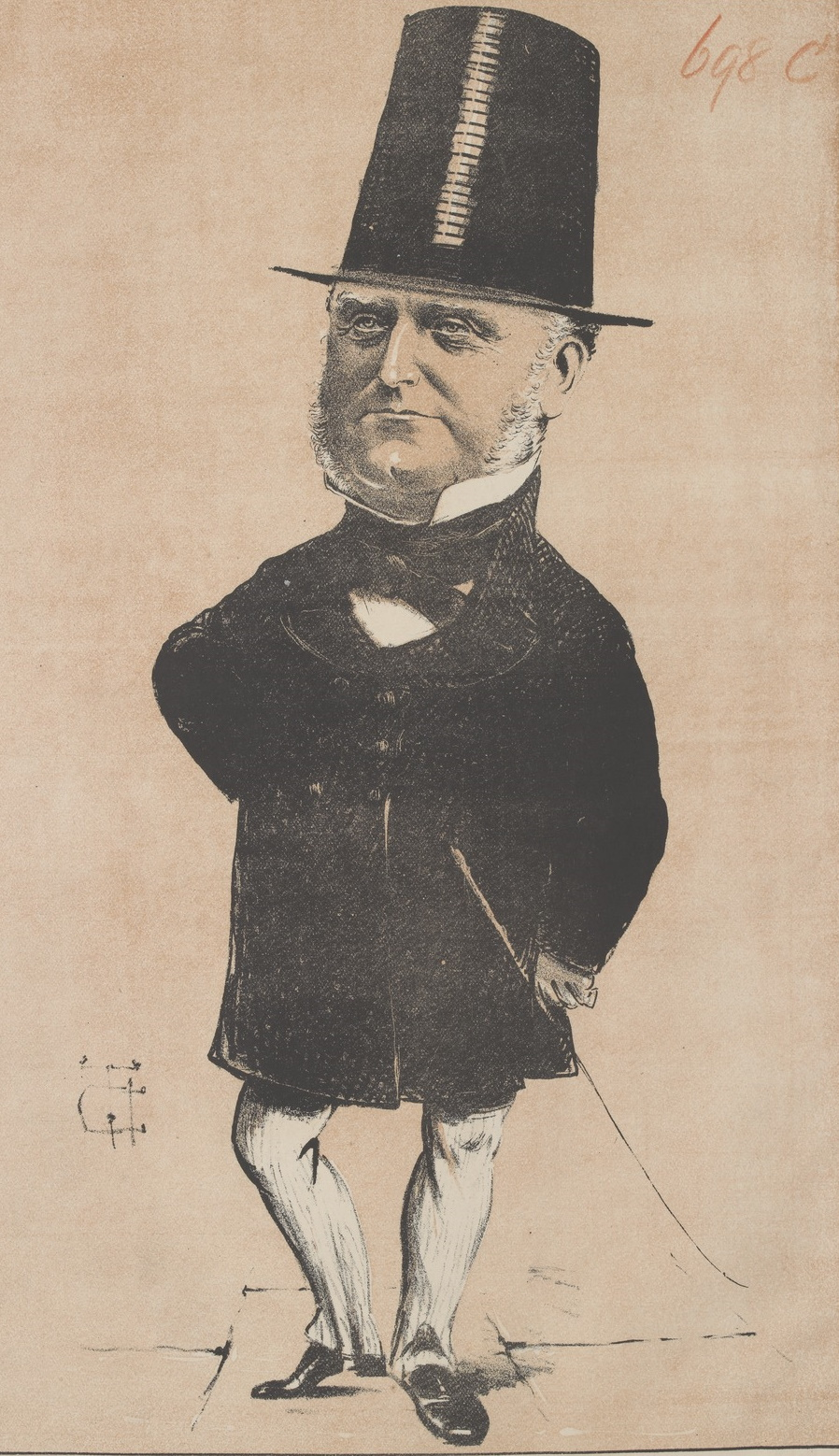
Caricature of Redmond Barry, Acting Chief Justice of Victoria, published in The Weekly Times, 25 October 1873.

Durkin produced a series of lithographic prints for the Melbourne newspaper, The Weekly Times, which were published from September 1873 to April 1875. The drawings were caricatures of thirty-six prominent men (and one woman), grouped under the title of 'Masks and Faces'. The concept was modelled on the 'Men of the Day' series of caricatures in London's Vanity Fair. The 'Masks and Faces' series commenced on 27 September 1873 with the publication of Durkin's caricature of John Thomas Smith. The illustration was entitled 'An Old Colonist' and came as a coloured supplement in the newspaper. The final caricature in the series was of William McCulloch, published on 3 April 1875.^{[C]}

In 1876, Tom Durkin and Bridget Agnes Murphy were married in Victoria.

Durkin also worked as an artist for the Victorian magazine Sam Slick which commenced in June 1879, described as a journal "brimful of wit, wisdom, satire and impudence". He also contributed to Queensland Punch in about 1880.

In December 1882, a number of cartoons and illustrations by Durkin were published in Punch Almanack 1883, the annual holiday-season publication by Melbourne Punch. A reviewer of the publication described Durkin as "well known for the special talent he possesses of delineating facial expression". His contributions to the Almanac included 'The Last Woman', depicting a semi-nude female figure addressing "Old Sol on the subject of departed fashion", against a background of "a heavy thunderstorm and impending chaos". Durkin contributed seven other large-format cartoons to the 1883 almanac, together with a number of "smaller etchings".

Durkin's wood engraving portrait of Miss Nellie Stewart was used for the cover of the 23 February 1884 edition of the Australian Graphic newspaper.

John Haynes, one of the founders of The Bulletin, left that magazine in 1885 to start Haynes' Weekly, described as "a very spicy production". Durkin contributed illustrations to Haynes' Weekly. Durkin also worked for three years as the staff artist for the Melbourne journal, Life.

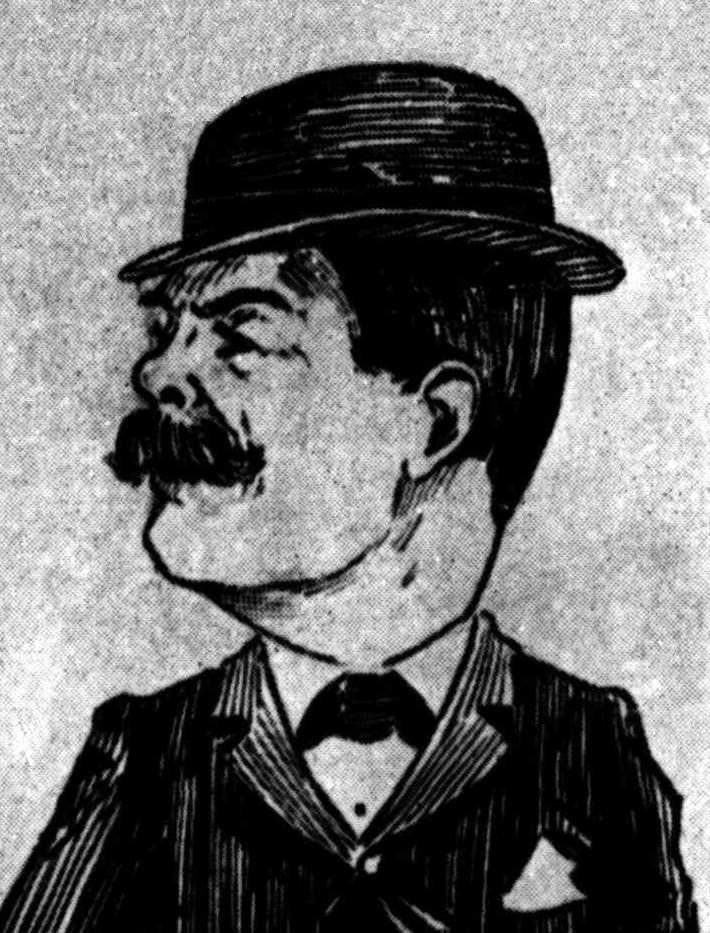
A caricature of Tom Durkin (artist unknown).

The popularity of Sydney's Bulletin magazine inspired Durkin and the writer Edward Dyson to establish a similar publication in Melbourne, which they named the Bull-Ant. Durkin and Dyson were part-owners of the newspaper, together with James Hamilton Smith. The journal, first printed in 1890, was described as "an illustrated comic weekly" and had its offices at 367a Little Bourke Street in Melbourne. The publication featured full-page cartoons and cover illustrations drawn by Durkin. During his time at Bull-Ant Durkin taught the "rudiments of art" to Edward Dyson's younger brothers Ambrose Dyson and Will Dyson. The Bull-Ant was considered to be an "unofficial Labor paper".

In late April 1891, Constable Cornelius Crowe, a policeman stationed at Fitzroy, initiated an action in the County Court against the proprietors of the Bull-Ant newspaper, Dyson, Durkin and Smith, seeking to recover £250 damages for libel. The alleged libel had been published on 29 January 1891, referring to the arrest and subsequent death of Alfred Gange, a cab-owner. Gange had been drunk on the streets of Fitzroy on the afternoon of January 22 and was arrested by Constable Crowe and put in the Fitzroy lock-up. Early the next morning when Gange was roused, "he appeared to be in a fit" and was taken to Melbourne Hospital in a cab where he later died. A coronial inquest that concluded on January 29 found that Gange had died "of an effusion of blood on the brain, caused by direct violence to the top of his head", but there was "no direct evidence to show how he received the injury". The jury expressed the opinion that Gange had received the fatal injury prior to being arrested. The references to the case published in the Bull-Ant was made up of "caustic remarks about the want of intelligence in the ordinary constable, and stated that Gange was only one of a number of unfortunate wretches who had been arrested in a dying state". An accompanying double-page cartoon by Durkin, as alleged by Constable Crowe, depicted him as incompetent, lacking intellect and engaging in "inhuman conduct", holding him up to "contempt, hatred and ridicule". The argument of the Bull-Ant proprietors was that the published comments and pictorial representation "were not meant to apply to the plaintiff individually, but to the lesser intellectual portion of the police force". The judge agreed that the article and illustration constituted libel and awarded damages of £100 against Dyson and Durkin. The judge determined that Smith had no part in the publication of the libel. The Ant, as the Bull-Ant was renamed, ceased publication in mid-1892.

=== The Bulletin ===
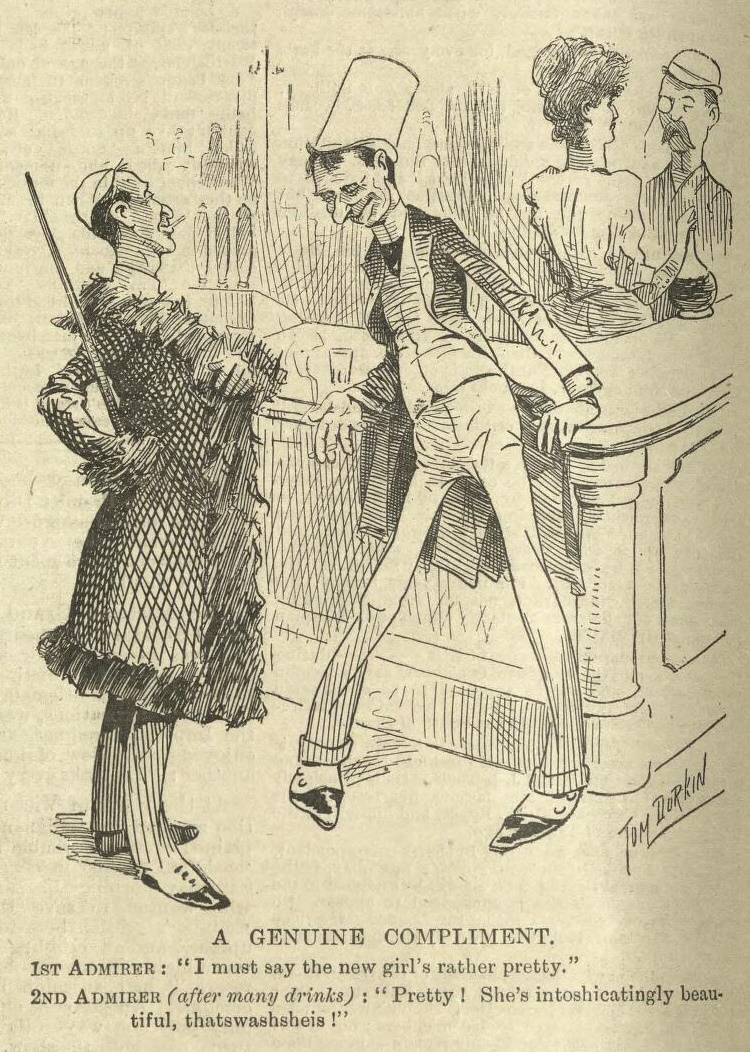
'A Genuine Compliment', from The Bulletin, 27 May 1893.

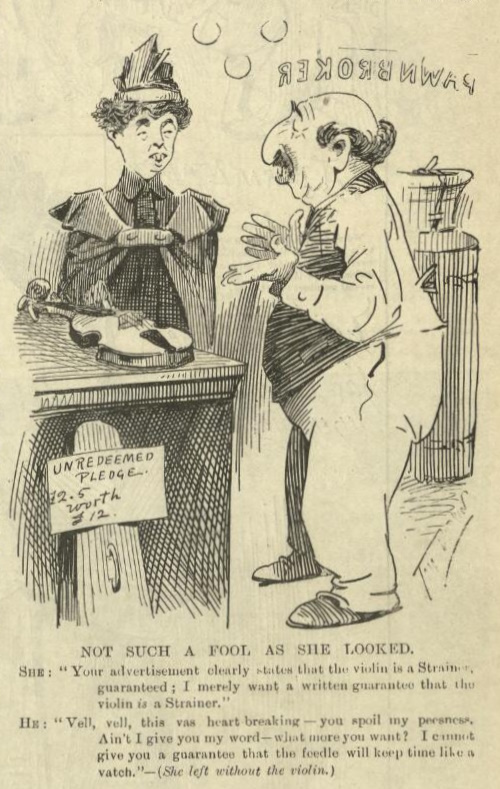
'Not Such a Fool as She Looked' (The Bulletin, 28 October 1893).

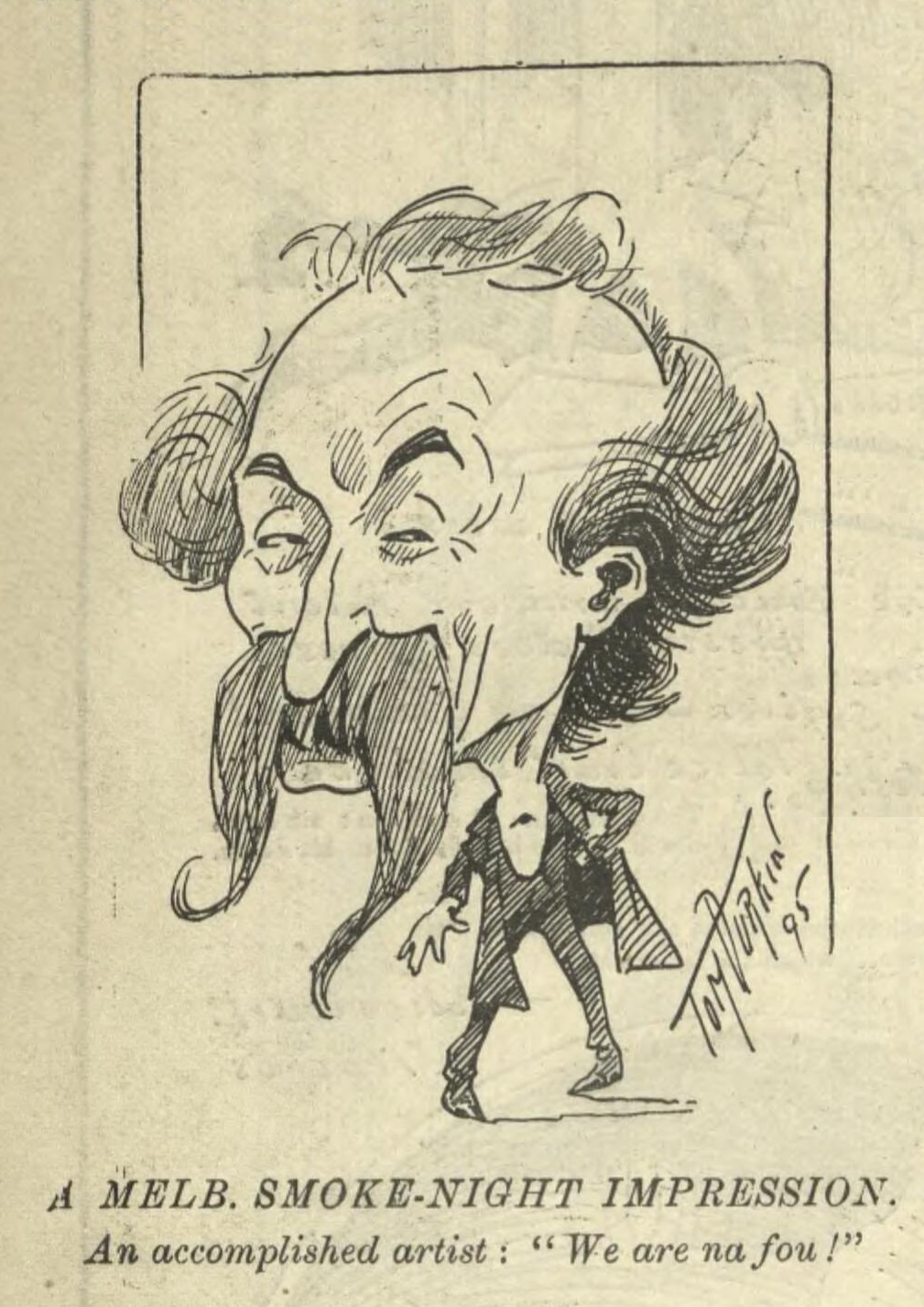
'A Melb. Smoke-night Impression', from The Bulletin, 10 August 1895.

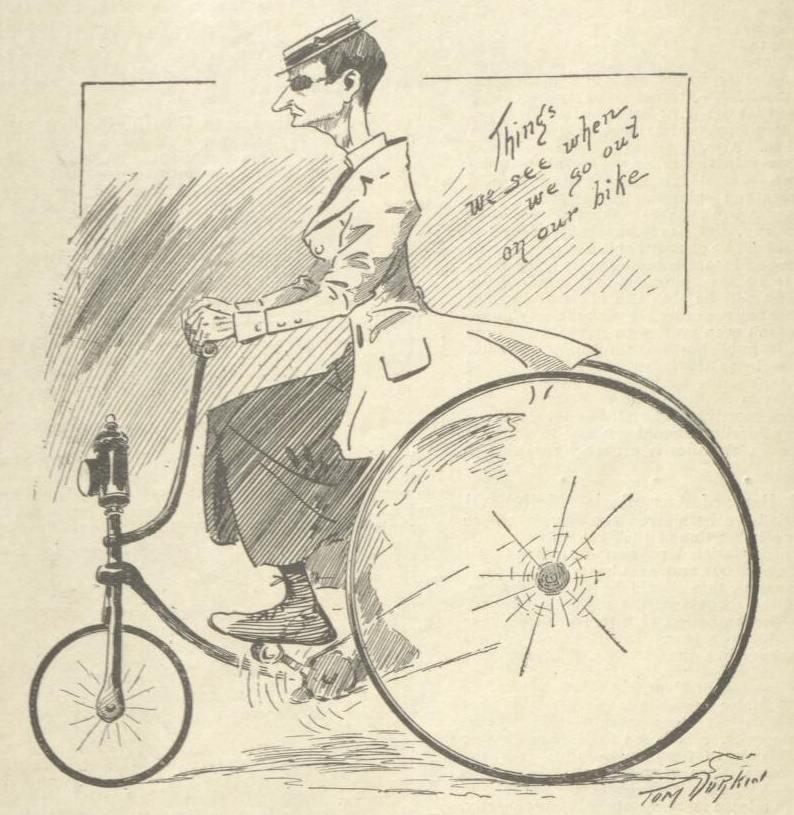
'Things we see when we go out on our bike', published in The Bulletin, 8 February 1896.

By 1889, Durkin had begun contributing cartoons to The Bulletin.

In February 1893, Durkin replaced George Rossi Ashton (brother of Julian Ashton) as The Bulletin's Melbourne cartoonist. Ashton had been contributing a regular full-page of cartoons and caricatures on a weekly basis, as commentary on political and social issues and current news-stories, most often as they related to Melbourne. When Durkin replaced Ashton he also produced a weekly Melbourne-themed page of cartoons and caricatures, similar to the pages previously done by Ashton, in addition to smaller-format cartoons.

Tom Durkin was considered to be the first Australian-born artist to join the staff of The Bulletin (though in a technical sense, he was born on board an incoming vessel).^{[D]}

During the years he worked for The Bulletin, Durkin also contributed cartoons to the Melbourne Tatler.

Durkin "had a genius for mechanics". In the last few years of his life he devoted himself to his various inventions, including a "novel weighbridge of his devising".

Durkin left The Bulletin at the end of April 1898, intending to depart for London soon afterwards to join the staff of Black and White, a leading English illustrated journal. He was replaced as the Bulletin's Melbourne artist by Alfred Vincent, who had previously worked for the Melbourne Punch. Durkin left Melbourne for Sydney, but did not proceed to London "through illness".

== Death ==
In December 1901, it was reported that Durkin was "lying seriously ill, of jaundice, in Melbourne Hospital". He was suffering from "a malignant growth on the liver" (also described as "an abscess on the liver"). By early February 1902 Durkin had been discharged from hospital after undergoing "a serious operation". It was initially thought that the operation had been successful, but "the disease developed again almost immediately".

Tom Durkin died on 29 April 1902 at his mother's residence in the Melbourne suburb of Newport, aged 49. He was buried in the Melbourne General Cemetery at North Carlton.

== Publications ==
Tom Durkin (1881), Original Comic Sketches.

== Gallery ==
A selection of images by Tom Durkin
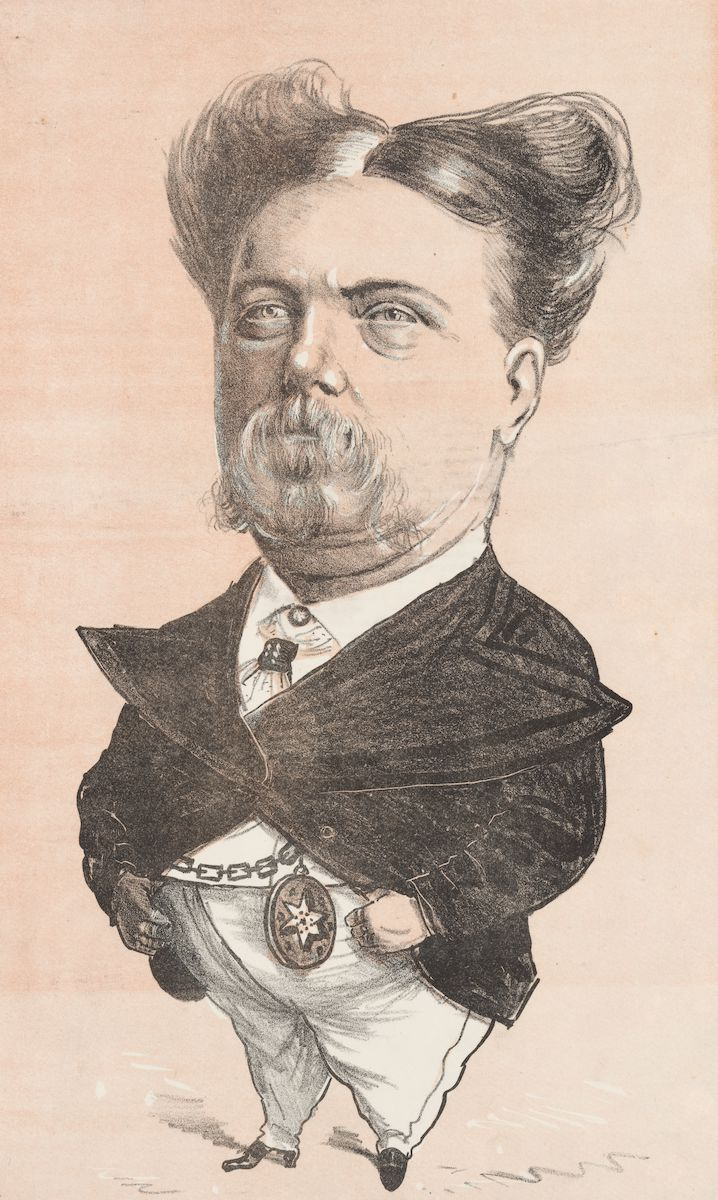
Caricature of Dr. James George Beaney (1828–1891), published in The Weekly Times 1874.

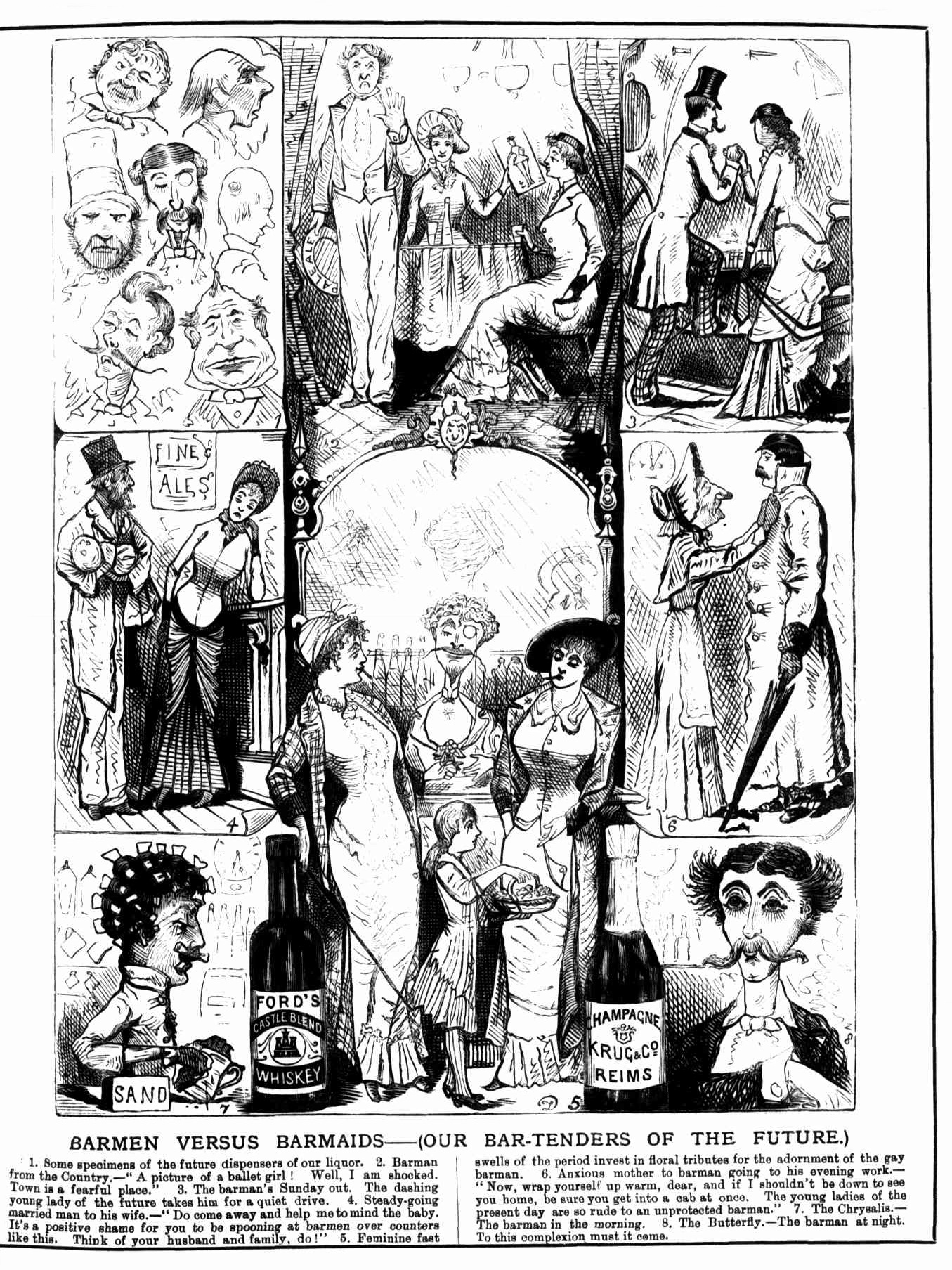
'Barmen Versus Barmaids', published in Punch Almanack 1983, 28 December 1882.

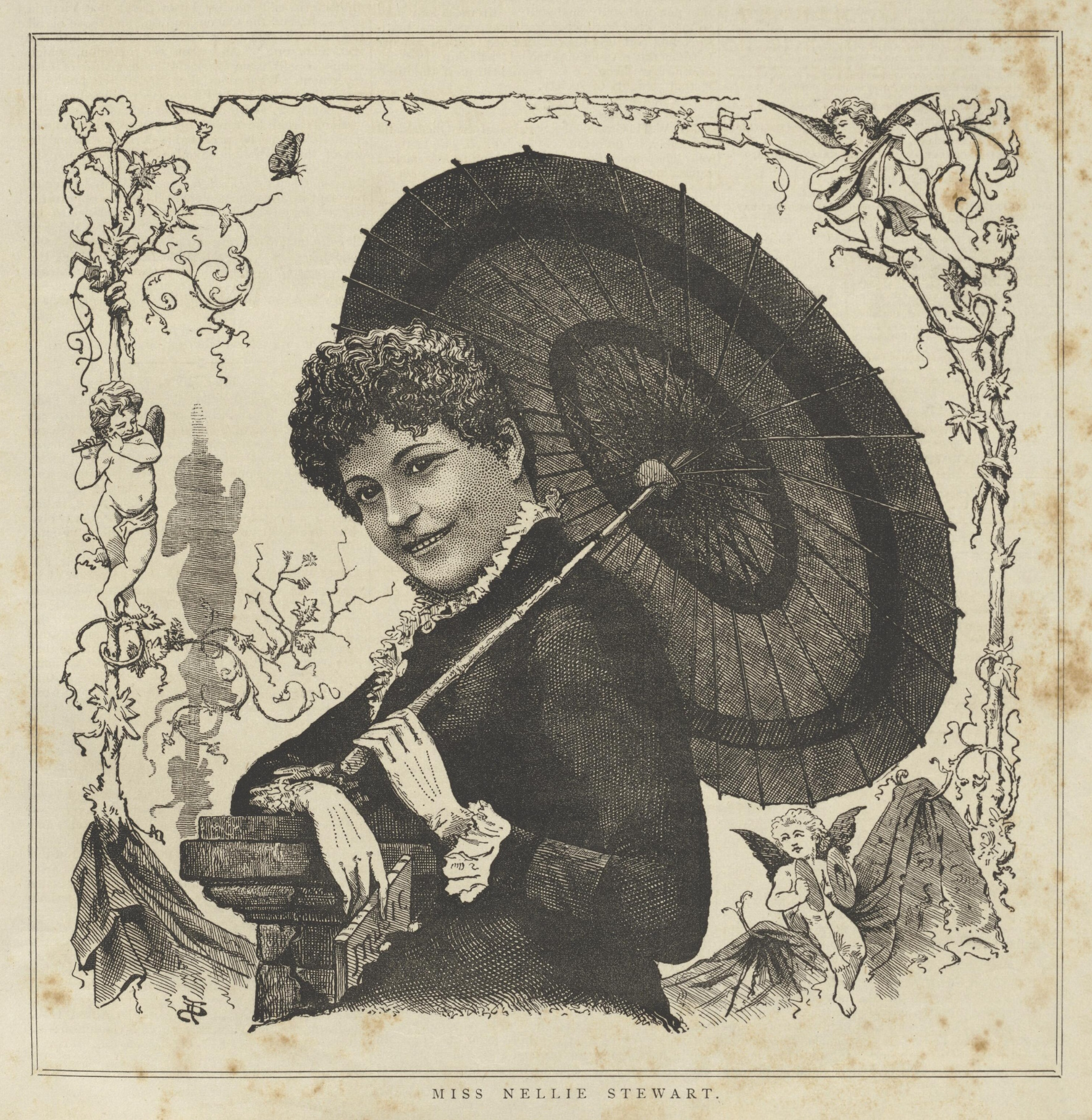
Portrait of Miss Nellie Stewart, from the cover of The Australian Graphic, 23 February 1884.

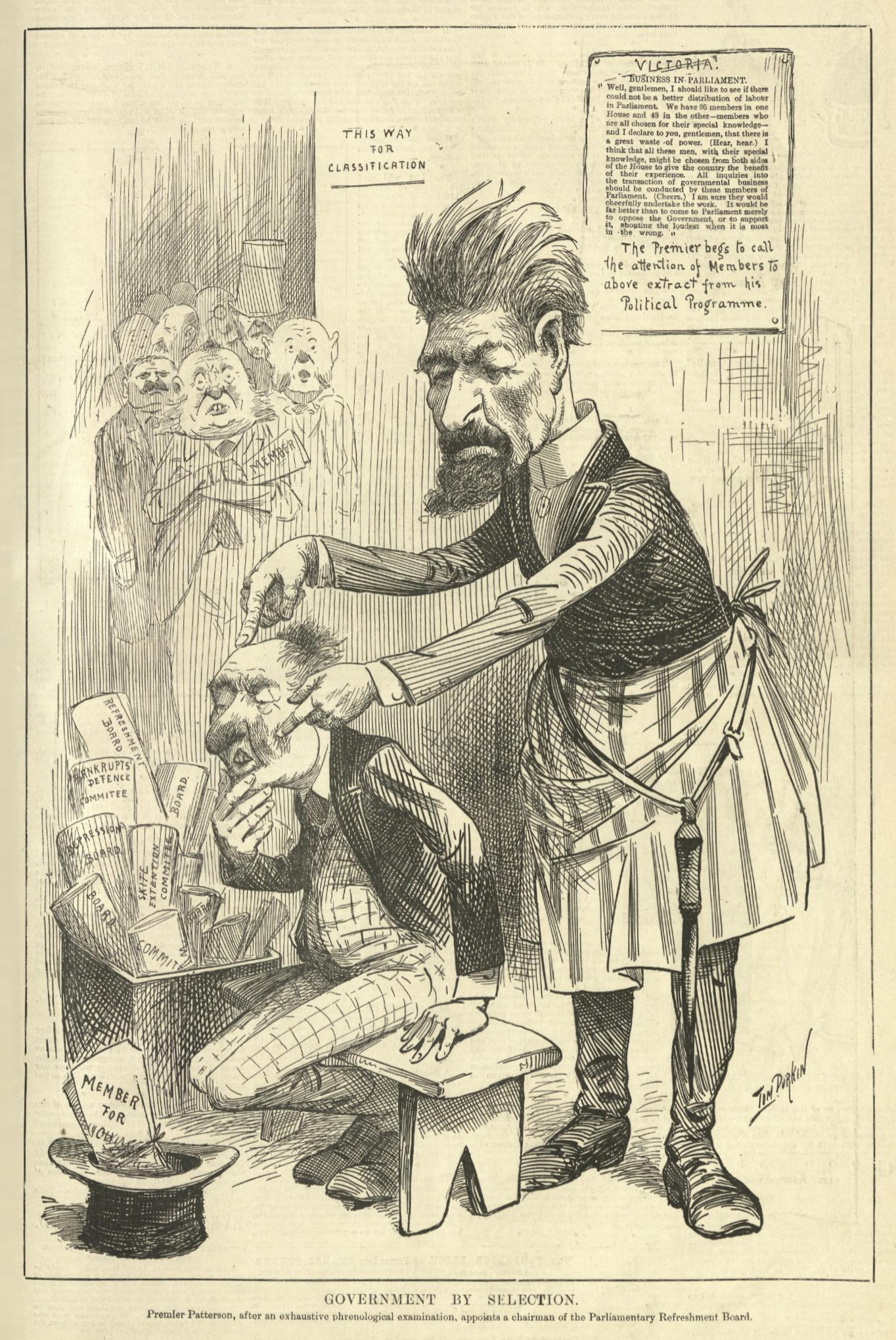
'Government by Selection' featuring a caricature of the Victorian Premier James Patterson, published in The Bulletin, 11 February 1893.

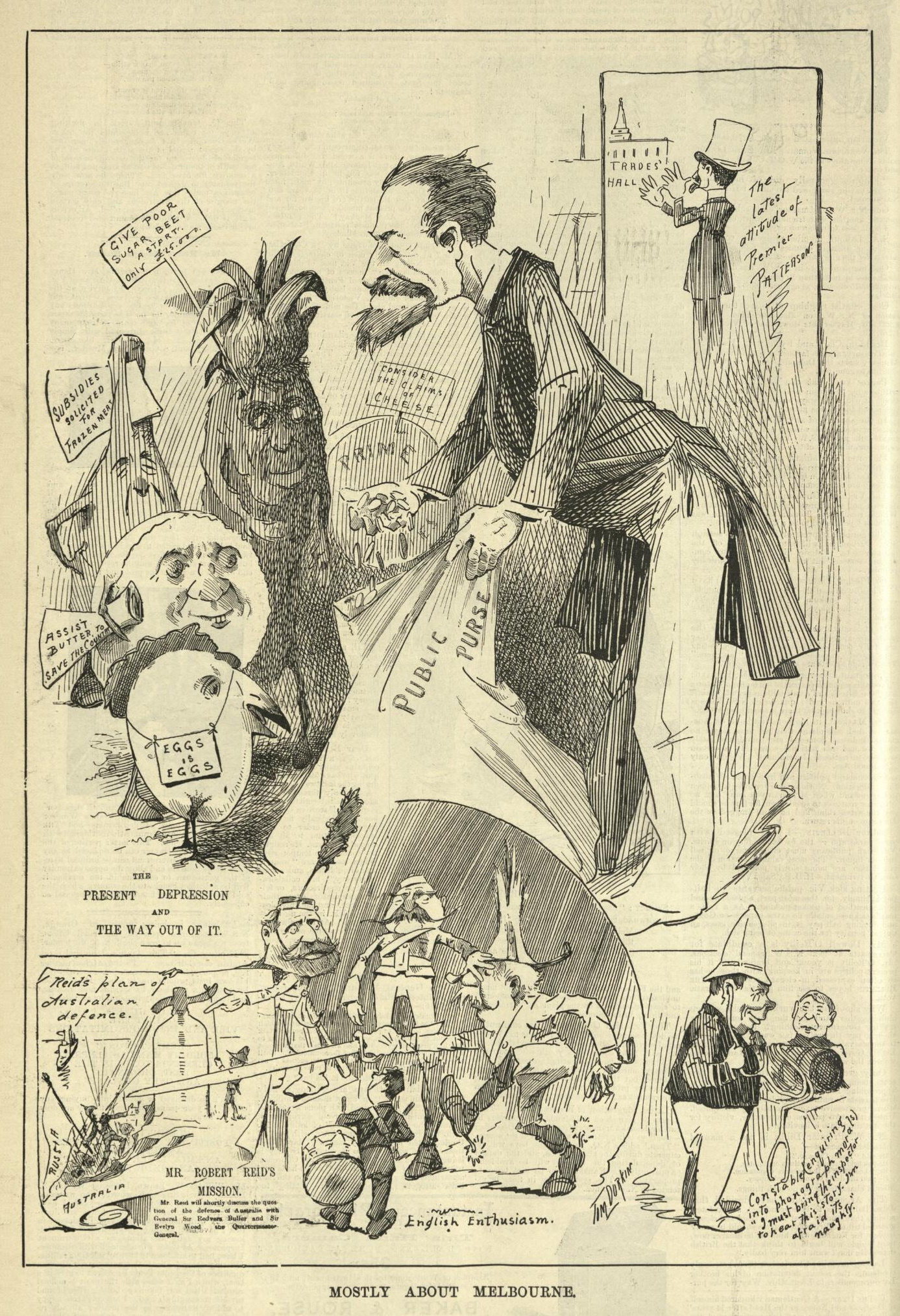
'Mostly About Melbourne', published in The Bulletin (Sydney), 3 March 1894.

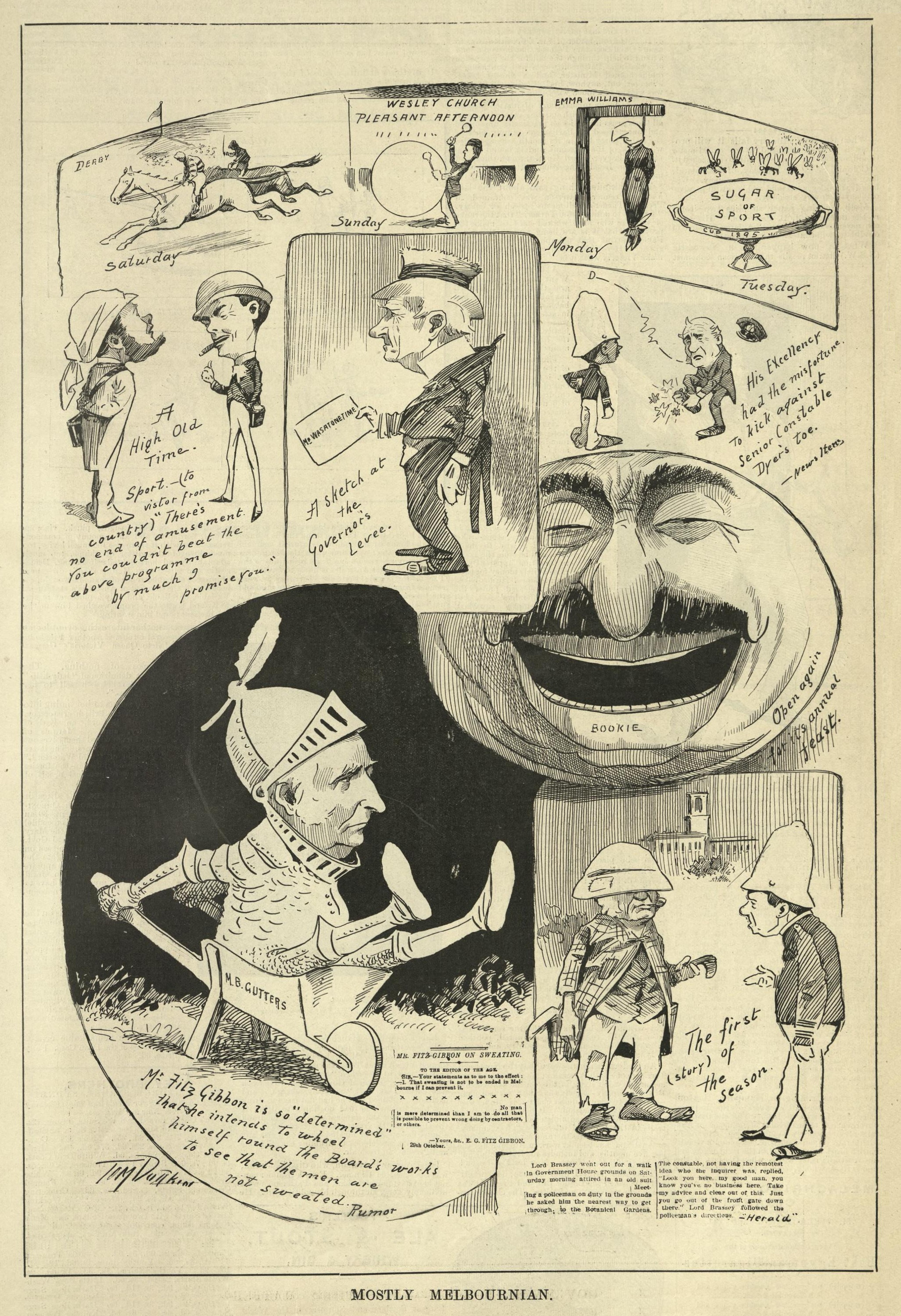
'Mostly Melbournian', published in The Bulletin, 9 November 1895.

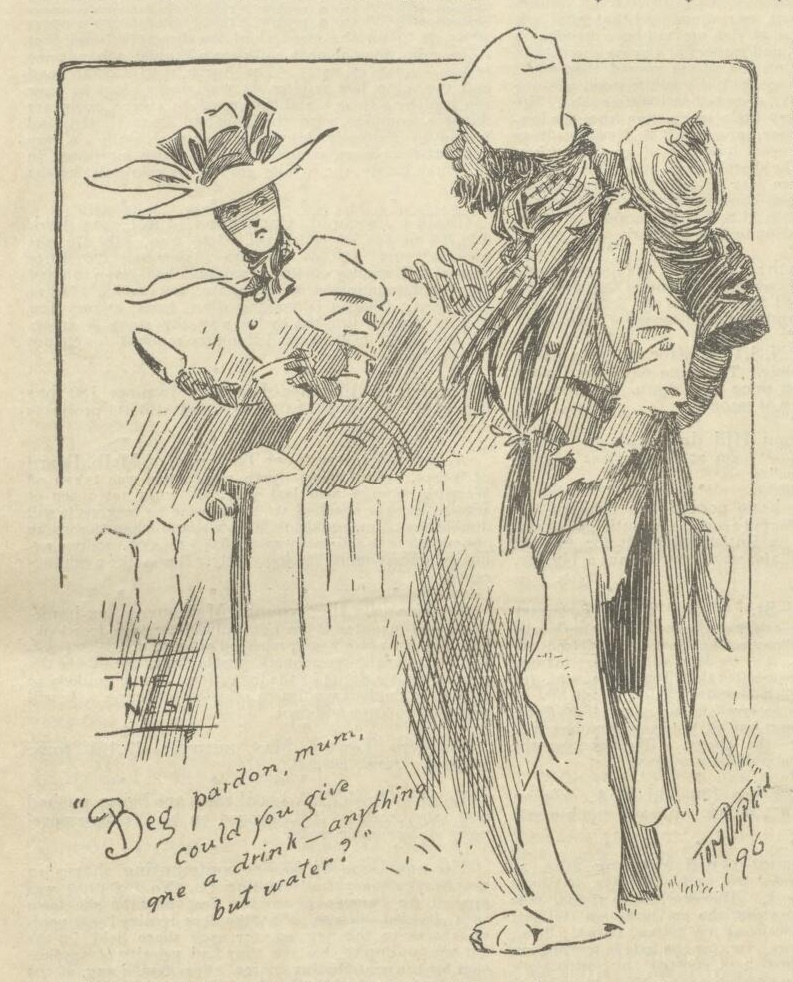
'Beg pardon, mum, could you give me a drink – anything but water?', published in The Bulletin, 27 June 1896.

== Notes ==
A.Family records state that Thomas Durkin was born at sea in 1853, aboard the West Wind at latitude 29°S and longitude 3°W. Some references claim Durkin was "born at sea near Victoria", but the location in the South Atlantic is based on the stated geographic co-ordinates.

B.The West Wind was a screw steam-ship, built in Delaware in the United States and launched in 1851. The steam-ship departed from New York in September 1852 for Australia. By the time it reached Cape Town in South Africa, the vessel had run out of fuel. The Captain was dismissed and the supercargo, William Smith, was eventually able to raise the funds, at a very high interest rate, to continue the voyage. When the West Wind reached Melbourne in late April 1853 "the ship was virtually insolvent". In August 1853 the ship was sold and made several trips between Melbourne and Adelaide. The vessel was destroyed by fire in February 1854 whilst laid up in Hobsons Bay, Port Phillip.

C.The National Portrait Gallery in Canberra holds fourteen lithographic prints from Durkin's 'Masks and Faces' series in its collection.

D.The Australian Natives' Association (A.N.A.) was a mutual society founded in Melbourne in 1871 for the benefit of white native-born Australians (with membership restricted to that group). In 1898 the A.N.A. adopted the rule that "a person born at sea on the voyage of his mother to an Australasian colony shall be deemed eligible for membership".
