= Rio Grande's Last Race and Other Verses =

1902 poetry collection by Banjo Paterson

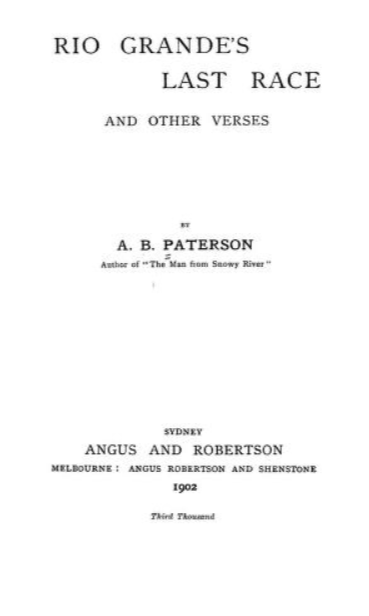
- Title page for Rio Grande's Last Race and Other Verses (1902)
- Author: Banjo Paterson
- Language: English
- Genre: Bush poetry
- Publisher: Angus and Robertson
- Publication date: 1902
- Publication place: Australia
- Media type: Print (hardback & paperback)
- Pages: 178
- Preceded by: The Man from Snowy River and Other Verses
- Followed by: Three Elephant Power and Other Stories

Rio Grande's Last Race and Other Verses (1902) is the second collection of poems by Australian poet Banjo Paterson. It was released in hardback by Angus and Robertson in 1902, and features the poems "Rio Grande's Last Race", "Mulga Bill's Bicycle", "Saltbush Bill's Game Cock" and "Saltbush Bill's Second Fight".

The original collection includes 46 poems by the author that are reprinted from various sources. Later editions added further poems.

== Contents ==
- "Rio Grande's Last Race"
- "By the Grey Gulf-Water"
- "With the Cattle"
- "The First Surveyor"
- "Mulga Bill's Bicycle"
- "The Pearl Diver"
- "The City of Dreadful Thirst"
- "Saltbush Bill's Gamecock"
- "Hay and Hell and Booligal"
- "A Walgett Episode"
- "Father Riley's Horse"
- "The Scotch Engineer"
- "Song of the Future"
- "Anthony Considine"
- "Song of the Artesian Water"
- "A Disqualified Jockey's Story"
- "The Road to Gundagai"
- "Saltbush Bill's Second Fight"
- "Hard Luck"
- "Song of Federation"
- "The Old Australian Ways"
- "The Ballad of the Calliope"
- "Do They Know?"
- "The Passing of Gundagai"
- "The Wargeilah Handicap"
- "Any Other Time"
- "The Last Trump"
- "Tar and Feathers"
- "It's Grand"
- "Out of Sight"
- "The Road to Old Man's Town"
- "The Old Timer's Steeplechase"
- "In the Stable"
- "He Giveth His Beloved Sleep"
- "Driver Smith"
- "There's Another Blessed Horse Fell Down"
- "On the Trek"
- "The Last Parade"
- "With French to Kimberley"
- "Johnny Boer"
- "What Have the Cavalry Done?"
- "Right in Front of the Army"
- "That V.C."
- "Fed Up"
- "Jock"
- "Santa Claus"

== Critical reception ==
On its original publication in Australia The Brisbane Courier noted "One may always bid welcome to the rattling poems of "Banjo" Paterson, for they have in them an irresistible swing, they are singularly grippy in descriptiveness, and they are racy of the soil. The verses in the volume now to hand are racy of more than one soil, however; they give us racing, droving, and bush incidents of Australia, and they rattle out also pen and ink pictures of South Africa, and of grim war."

== See also ==
- 1902 in Australian literature
- 1902 in poetry
