= La terre est ronde (disambiguation) =

La terre est ronde is a French expression meaning "world is round".

It may refer to:

- "La terre est ronde", single by Orelsan from his 2011 album Le chant des sirènes
- La terre est ronde, 1937 play by Armand Salacrou
- Le terre est ronde, 1960 film by Philippe Ducrest

== See also ==
- The World Is Round (disambiguation)
