= The Old Australian Ways =

1902 poem by Banjo Paterson

- by A. B. Paterson
- Written: 1902
- First published in: Rio Grande's Last Race and Other Verses
- Country: Australia
- Language: English
- Lines: 72

Full text
- The Old Australian Ways at Wikisource

"The Old Australian Ways" is a poem by Australian bush poet Banjo Paterson (Andrew Barton Paterson).

It was first published in the poet's collection Rio Grande's Last Race and Other Verses in 1902, and subsequently reprinted in the author's poetry collections and other poetry anthologies.

== Synopsis ==
The poet compares the "prison's bars" of the city folk of London, with the wide open land of Australia. He writes of Clancy (of the "Overflow") who saddled a horse and rode west and states that if you want to know what he found there, then you would need to go "Beyond the reach of rule or law", to "Nature's homestead" to "see what Clancy saw/And know what Clancy knew."

== Critical reception ==
In a review of the author's Rio Grande's Last Race and Other Verses a writer in The Grafton Argus and Clarence River General Advertiser noted that "The best of his work at present is that in which he abandons the purely quizzical vein, and which gives descriptions of the land he touched with some light of imagination–as in 'The Old Australian Ways'".

== Publication history ==
After its original publication in Rio Grande's Last Race and Other Verses the poem was later reprinted as follows:

- An Anthology of Australian Verse edited by Bertram Stevens, Angus and Robertson, 1907
- The Golden Treasury of Australian Verse edited by Bertram Stevens, Angus and Robertson, 1909
- The Children's Treasury of Australian Verse edited by Bertram Stevens and George Mackaness, Angus and Robertson, 1913
- Selections from Australian Poets edited by Bertram Stevens and George Mackaness, Cornstalk Publishing, 1925
- Poets of Australia : An Anthology of Australian Verse edited by George Mackaness, Angus & Robertson, 1946
- An Anthology of Australian Verse edited by George Mackaness, Angus & Robertson, 1952
- The Collected Verse of Banjo Paterson edited by Clement Semmler, Viking O'Neill, 1982
- Song of the Pen, A. B. (Banjo) Paterson : Complete Works 1901-1941 edited by Rosamund Campbell and Philippa Harvie, Lansdowne, 1983
- The New Oxford Book of Australian Verse edited by Les Murray, Oxford University Press, 1986
- Banjo Paterson's Poems of the Bush, J. M. Dent, 1987
- A Vision Splendid: The Complete Poetry of A. B. 'Banjo' Paterson, Angus and Robertson, 1990
- Selected Poems : A. B. Paterson edited by Les Murray, 1992
- The Collected Verse of A. B. Paterson : Containing 'The Man from Snowy River', 'Rio Grande' and 'Saltbush Bill, M.P.' , 1921
- Our Country : Classic Australian Poetry : From Colonial Ballads to Paterson & Lawson edited by Michael Cook, Little Hills Press, 2002
- Banjo Paterson Treasury by A. B. Paterson, Random House, 2013

== See also ==
- 1902 in Australian literature
