= By the Grey Gulf-Water =

1897 poem by Banjo Paterson

- by A. B. Paterson
- Written: 1897
- First published in: The Bulletin
- Country: Australia
- Language: English
- Publication date: 11 December 1897
- Lines: 36

Full text
- By the Grey Gulf-water at Wikisource

"By the Grey Gulf-Water" is a poem by Australian bush poet Banjo Paterson (Andrew Barton Paterson).

It was first published in The Bulletin on 11 December 1897, as by "The Banjo" under the title "On the Grey Gulf-water", and subsequently reprinted in the author's poetry collections and other poetry anthologies.

== Critical reception ==
In a review of Rio Grande's Last Race and Other Verses in The Register (Adelaide) the writer noted that the poem looks at a "little-known region" and describes it "in lines which skilfully give the impression of vague waste space".

A review of the same book in The Evening News (Sydney) called the poem "a mournful and beautiful song of 'a great grey chaos'".

== Publication history ==
After its original publication in The Bulletin the poem was later reprinted as follows:

- Rio Grande's Last Race and Other Verses by A. B. Paterson, Angus and Robertson, 1902
- An Anthology of Australian Verse edited by Bertram Stevens, Angus and Robertson, 1907
- The Golden Treasury of Australian Verse edited by Bertram Stevens, Angus and Robertson, 1909
- The Freeman's Journal, 2 February 1911
- The Bulletin, 1 February 1933
- The Collected Verse of A. B. Paterson : Containing 'The Man from Snowy River', 'Rio Grande' and 'Saltbush Bill, M.P.', 1921
- Singer of the Bush, A. B. (Banjo) Paterson : Complete Works 1885-1900 edited by Rosamund Campbell and Philippa Harvie, Lansdowne, 1983
- The Banjo's Best-Loved Poems compiled by Rosamund Campbell and Philppa Harvie, Weldon Publishing, 1985
- Banjo Paterson's Poems of the Bush, J. M. Dent, 1987
- A Vision Splendid: The Complete Poetry of A. B. 'Banjo' Paterson, Angus and Robertson, 1990
- Selected Poems : A. B. Paterson edited by Les Murray, 1992
- Banjo Paterson : His Poetry and Prose edited by Richard Hall, Allen & Unwin, 1993
- The Collected Verse of Banjo Paterson edited by Clement Semmler, Viking O'Neill, 1993
- The Bush Poems of A. B. (Banjo) Paterson edited by Jack Thompson, FinePoets, 2008

== See also ==
- 1897 in Australian literature
