= The Song of Brotherhood, and Other Verses =

Poetry collection by John Le Gay Brereton

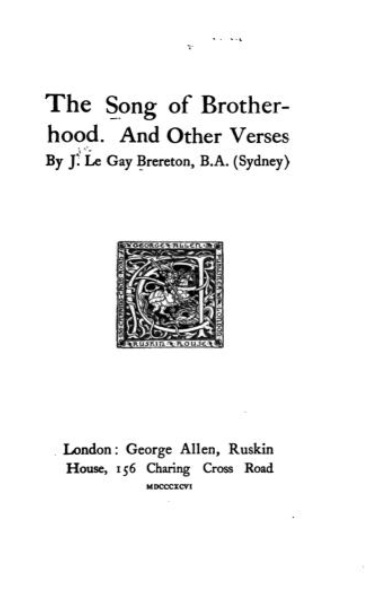
- Title page for The Song of Brotherhood, and Other Verses (1896)
- Author: J. Le Gay Brereton
- Language: English
- Genre: Poetry collection
- Publisher: G. Allen, London
- Publication date: 1896
- Publication place: Australia
- Media type: Print
- Pages: 175pp
- Preceded by: –
- Followed by: Landlopers

The Song of Brotherhood, and Other Verses (1896) is the first poetry collection by Australian poet J. Le Gay Brereton.

The collection sold well enough at the time of its release for The Sydney Mail to report on 22 August 1896 that a second edition had been ordered by the publishers.

== Contents ==
- "Apologia"
- "The Song of Brotherhood"
- "For a Woman"
- "Absence"
- "The Sunrise"
- "The Street"
- "Love's Invitation"
- "Kit Marlowe"
- "To Olive Schreiner"
- "Drinking Song"
- "Hill and Dale"
- "The Black Art"
- "Dream - Gold"
- "The End"
- "After"
- "Maiden with the Marvellous Lute"
- "A Song of Friendship"
- "The Last Quest"
- "The Watching of the Sparrow-Hawk"
- "Storm"
- "For My Sister"
- "Serenade"
- "The Presence of the Bush"
- "The Picture"
- "Fulfilment"
- "Sonnet"
- "Rouge et Noir"
- "We Meet"
- "The Unfading Vision"

== Critical reception ==
A reviewer in The Queenslander was impressed with every aspect of the collection finding that it "is got up (as a matter of course in super-excellent style) on hand-made rough-edged paper, with title-page lettered in red and black, and bound in dull-crimson cloth, so that the lover of good craftsmanship in the way of typography and book-making is taken with it at the first glance. Turning to the contents, one finds that the author has not bestowed less pains in the facetting and polishing of such jewels as he has to offer than upon their setting. With regard, nevertheless, to the gems themselves, it is to be confessed that their radiance is that of the Rhine-stone rather than of the rarer crystals of Blomfontein and Brazil."

After noting the poet's apology to his father (the poet John Le Gay Brereton snr) for presuming to be a poet in the first place, a reviewer in The Maitland Daily Mercury found "The devout and filial aspiration has been met: here is a volume of poetry — of narrow range certainly, but expressed in melodious words informed by deep thoughts. Mr. Le Gay Brereton has set himself, we take it, to utter what emotional men feel about woman's love, their sense of restraint under the conditions of life and the hamperings of mortality, their regret about past and lost joy and past failures, their longings for a bliss to come, their vagrant fancies and their fervent hopes. There are poets who paint the life of action and who inspire men to action, but since men dream and ponder as well as act and work, he is also a poet who utters for those last what is in their minds. Mr. Le Gay Brereton's muse is undoubtedly sensuous and dreamy; she is serious if not sombre; but she sings well in her minor key. We admire in these pages the mastery of the poet over language and rhyme, which he makes his obedient instruments. Popular his little work will not be, but it will be grateful to the lovers of melodious verse, who seek soothing rather than stirring influences from poetry."

== See also ==
- 1896 in Australian literature
