= Cleaning Up (poem) =

1892 poem by Edward Dyson

- by Edward Dyson
- Written: 1892
- First published in: The Bulletin
- Country: Australia
- Language: English
- Publication date: 4 June 1892
- Lines: 36

Full text
- Cleaning Up at Wikisource

Cleaning Up is a poem by Australian writer and poet Edward Dyson. It was first published in The Bulletin magazine on 4 June 1892, as by "E. D." and later in the poet's collection Rhymes from the Mines and Other Lines (1896).

== Synopsis ==
The poem describes a man's experience of the sluicing process on a mid-nineteenth century Victorian gold field. Here a large number of men are working together to process the loads of gravel and sand they have collected during the day.

== Analysis ==
While reviewing the poet's collection Rhymes from the Mines and Other Lines, a writer in The Maitland Daily Mercury noted, "The main burden of Mr. Dyson's song is the life of the gold digger. He sets forth in vigorous aud tuneful numbers, its varied phases — its humours and comedy, its dread tragedies, its vicissitudes, its longings and hopes, and its triumphs. Mr. Dyson writes of the life as one who has lived through it; he is as we judge one who has played the game, not a mere onlooker." They went on to describe this particular poem as "a story the burden of which is the eager anticipation attending the process described, and the satisfaction of success."

== Further publications ==
After the poem's initial publication in The Bulletin it was reprinted as follows:

- Rhymes from the Mines and Other Lines, Angus and Robertson, 1896
- Poets of Australia : An Anthology of Australian Verse edited by George Mackaness, Angus & Robertson, 1946
- An Anthology of Australian Verse edited by George Mackaness, Angus & Robertson, 1952
- The Boomerang Book of Australian Poetry edited by Enid Moodie Heddle, Longmans Green, 1956
- From the Ballads to Brennan edited by T. Inglis Moore, Angus & Robertson, 1964
- An Australian Treasury of Popular Verse edited by Jim Haynes, ABC Books, 2002
- Two Centuries of Australian Poetry edited by Kathrine Bell, Gary Allen, 2007

== See also ==
- 1892 in poetry
- 1892 in literature
- 1892 in Australian literature
- Australian literature
