= Jennie Thornley Clarke =

American educator, writer, anthologist (1860–1924)

- Born: September 20, 1860; Winston-Salem, North Carolina, U.S.
- Died: December 27, 1924 (aged 64); Winston-Salem, U.S.
- Education: University of Nashville
- Occupations: Educator; writer; anthologist
- Writing career
- Notable work: Songs of the South. Choice Selections from Southern Poets from Colonial Times to the Present Day

Jennie Thornley Clarke (September 20, 1860 – December 27, 1924) was an American educator, writer, and anthologist. She was the author of Songs of the South. Choice Selections from Southern Poets from Colonial Times to the Present Day. Joel Chandler Harris, who furnished an introduction to the book, said that, as far as he knew, this volume was the first of American anthologies devoted wholly to verse produced by southern writers. It was one of the two most influential poetry anthologies on the market between 1890 and World War I.

== Early life and education ==
Jennie Thornley Clarke was born in Winston-Salem, North Carolina, September 20, 1860. She said she was a native Georgia although she was born among the first families of Vermont. Her father, John Archer Clarke, was a poet; he died in early manhood. Brought up in a library and carefully taught by her mother, Mary Ellis (West) Clarke, Jennie was twice graduated with the highest honors; first, by a female college in Georgia and afterwards (in 1889), by the University of Nashville.

== Career ==
Immediately elected to the chair of Latin in the State Industrial College in Mississippi, she remained there until called to the same chair in the Georgia College & State University in Milledgeville. Her memory seemed to contain a whole library, and every line of Virgil or Horace recalled to her a wealth of illustrations from ancient and modern English poets. This exceptional acquaintance with poetry, coupled with her ability and experience as a critic, made her singularly fit for the task she undertook, that of collecting the highlights of southern poetry in a volume under the title of Songs of the South. She wrote for many periodicals, chiefly educational.

== Death ==
Clarke died in Winston-Salem on December 27, 1924.

== Awards and honors ==
The Normal College at Nashville awarded her a silver medal in 1889.

== Selected works ==
Songs of the South

- Songs of the South. Choice Selections from Southern Poets from Colonial Times to the Present Day (1896)
