= Songs of the South =

Songs of the South

Songs of the South. Choice Selections from Southern Poets from Colonial Times to the Present Day (Lippincott, 1896) was collected and edited by Jennie Thornley Clarke. It was one of the two most influential poetry anthologies on the market between 1890 and World War I. It included an appendix of brief biographical notes. The volume was said to have decided interest. About 150 southern poets were represented by one or more poems, including Edgar Allan Poe, Sarah Morgan Bryan Piatt, Abram Joseph Ryan, Amelia B. Welby, Sidney Lanier, Paul Hamilton Hayne, John Milton Harney, and others. In an introduction, Joel Chandler Harris, said: "So far as the writer knows, this volume is the first of American anthologies devoted wholly to verses produced by southern writers. There have been collections of the war poetry of the south, and there are others that deal with all forms of southern literary talent, but the following pages are given over entirely to collections from the writings of those who have made contributions to American verse."
