= The World Is Round (novel) =

Book by Louise Mack

The World is Round
- Author: Louise Mack
- Language: English
- Genre: Fiction
- Publisher: T. Fisher Unwin, London
- Publication date: 1896
- Publication place: Australia
- Media type: Print
- Pages: 96pp
- Preceded by: –
- Followed by: Teens: A Story of Australian School Girls

The World is Round (1896) is the first novel by Australian writer Louise Mack.

== Story outline ==
The novel follows the story of Jean Burnes, a young Sydney woman with dreams of becoming a novelist. Her manuscript is altered by her lover Musgrave and it goes on to great success. But Jean's fame is wounded when Musgrave claims the success for himself, denigrating her in the process.

== Critical reception ==
In The Sunday Times (Sydney) a reviewer believes that the author shows promise but the novel "is a well-written yet not deeply engrossing story of the love and literary aspirations of a Sydney girl. The book does not show Miss Mack at her best. Some of the characters are too evidently the creations of youthful inexperience, and are not likely to be acceptable to men and women of the world who know their species from constant contact with the many varieties under the ever-changing conditions of life."

Commenting on the re-issue of the book in 1993 Veronica Sen in The Canberra Times notes: "Surprisingly advanced in its asides on female role conditioning and the different valuing of male and female behaviour, this 1896 novella is otherwise a fairly standard romance. Until, that is, a rejected lover breaks the rules of good form. Mack treats with irony the triumph of love between the young heroine and her deliberately blind successful suitor, despite its foundation on vanity and falsehood. Had the author cultivated her obvious satiric gifts, her career might have been as brilliant as that of Miles Franklin."

== See also ==
- 1896 in Australian literature
