= Rhymes from the Mines and Other Lines =

Collected poems by Edward Dyson

Rhymes From the Mines and Other Lines
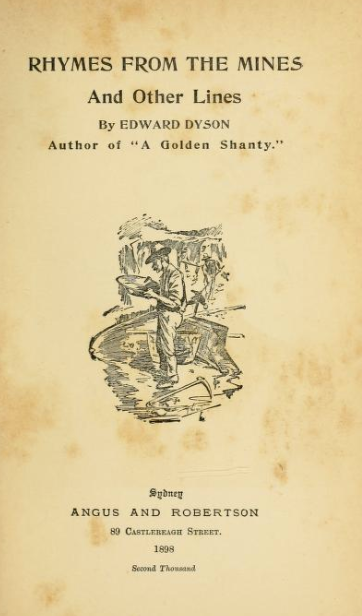
- Title page for Rhymes from the Mines and Other Lines (1898 edition)
- Author: Edward Dyson
- Language: English
- Genre: Bush poetry
- Publisher: Angus and Robertson
- Publication date: 1896
- Publication place: Australia
- Media type: Print (hardback & paperback)
- Pages: 178

Rhymes From the Mines and Other Lines (1896) was the first collection of poems by Australian poet Edward Dyson. It was released in hardback by Angus and Robertson in 1896, but not reprinted until 1973, and then with the title Rhymes From the Mines. It features some of the poet's major early works, including "The Old Whim Horse", "The Rescue" and "The Worked-Out Mine".

The original collection includes 39 poems by the author that are reprinted from various sources, though they mainly originally appeared in The Bulletin.

== Contents ==
- "The Men of the Mines"
- "The Old Whim Horse"
- "Cleaning Up"
- "The Rescue"
- "Bashful Gleeson"
- "The Worked-Out Mine"
- "German Joe"
- "Waiting for Water"
- "When Brother Peetree Prayed: A Recollection"
- "The Old Camp Oven"
- "When the Bell Blew Up"
- "The Trucker"
- "'Stop-And-See'"
- "In 'The Benevolent'"
- "Jonah's Luck"
- "Night Shift"
- "A Friendly Game of Football"
- "The Tale of Steven"
- "The Fossicker"
- "The Tin-Pot Mill"
- "A Poor Joke"
- "Breaking it Gently"
- "Struck It At Last"
- "The Prospectors"
- "Peter Simson's Farm"
- "Since Nellie Came to Live Along the Creek"
- "The Freak"
- "In Town"
- "The Deserted Homestead"
- "A New Girl up at White's : A Saw-Millers Lament"
- "Whose Wife?"
- "Battered Bob"
- "The Splitter"
- "To His Excellency"
- "Bullocky Bill and His Old Red Team"
- "The Drovers in Reply"
- "The Shanty"
- "Ah Ling, the Leper"
- "The Emu of Whroo"

== Critical reception ==
A reviewer in The Town and Country Journal opined that "The Australian school of poetry, as we may fairly call it by now, is usually associated with a free and easy style of composition, in which the metre is so excessively free that it is not always easy to read into rhythm. Of this style the present book of verses is a good and typical example, and will not diminish the fame earned for its author by "A Golden Shanty." In the subject of mining he has struck a lode of almost wholly new poetical material, full of incident and adventure, and thrilling with hopes fulfilled or disappointed. The writer is evidently well acquainted with mining life, and gives expression to the comic as well as the pathetic aspects of its scenes and characters. The daring rescue of entombed miners; the desolation of the deserted works haunted by the ghostly-grey old whim-horse, the regrets of one pent in a city slum for the fierce freshness of the wilder life, are few of the subjects, not unworthy of poetic treatment, and handled in a manner whose very ruggedness is appropriate."

In their review The Australasian ranked Dyson with some of the other well-known Australian poets of the time: "Mr. Edward Dyson is a welcome addition to the little band of writers who, within the last few years, have striven with no small success to found a distinctly Australian school of poetry. His "Rhymes from the Mines and Other Lines," published by Messrs. Angus and Robertson, of Sydney, are, like the verses of Messrs. A. B. Paterson, Henry Lawson, and Thomas Heney, thoroughly racy of the soil, and reproduce with great fidelity many of the rougher and more striking aspects of Australian society."

== See also ==
- 1896 in Australian literature
- 1896 in poetry
