= Mulga Bill's Bicycle =

Poem by Banjo Paterson

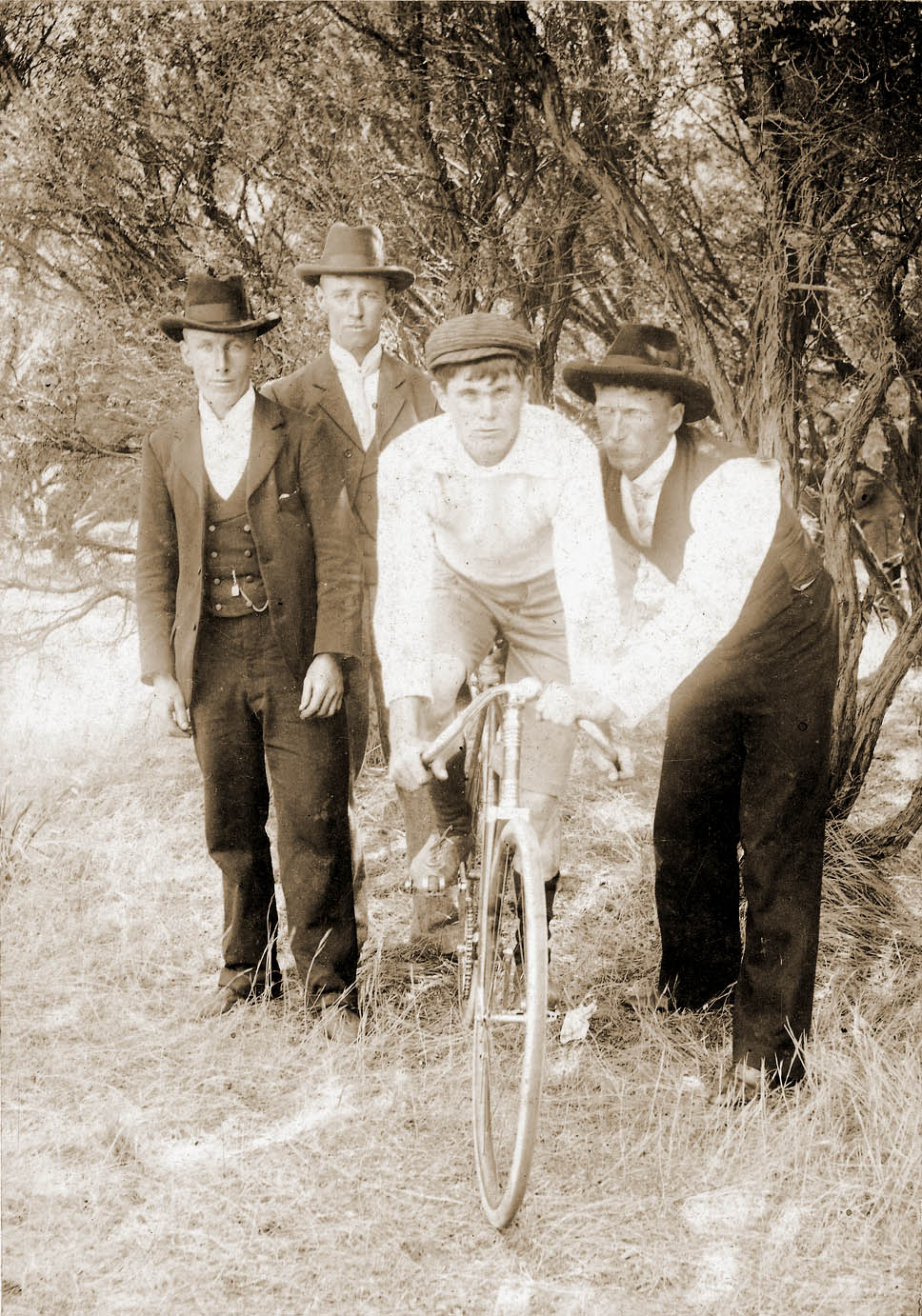
Three men and a boy on a bicycle ca. 1896- ca. 1904 in Victoria, Australia

"Mulga Bill's Bicycle" is a poem written in 1896 by Banjo Paterson. It was originally published on the 25 July 1896 edition of the Sydney Mail, and later appeared in the poet's second poetry collection Rio Grande's Last Race and Other Verses.

The poem is a ballad. Each line is a fourteener, having fourteen syllables and seven iambic feet.

== Synopsis ==
Mulga Bill's is a tragic tale of a young man whose pride in his riding skill causes him to purchase, ride and crash a bicycle. Although Mulga Bill claims expertise in riding all things his ineptitude and subsequent accident suggest that he may only know how to ride a horse.

== Background ==
The poem was first published in The Sydney Mail on 25 July 1896 and was illustrated by Norman Hardy who depicts Mulga Bill sat astride the front wheel pedaling with his knees UNDER the handle bars establishing with certainty that he is riding an Ordinary on his perilous ride. It is amongst Paterson's most popular works. A 1973 reprinting of the poem illustrated by Kilmeny & Deborah Niland has been continuously in print since publication and won the 1973 ABPA Book Design Award and the 1974 Visual Arts Board Award.

The novel by H. G. Wells on cycling, The Wheels of Chance: A Bicycling Idyll was published in the same year as this poem.

Ordinaries- the term "Penny-Farthings" is used interchangeably by many- were notoriously dangerous to ride on level ground, but Banjo has Mulga Bill cycling DOWNHILL on a mountain road at which point he gains so much speed that he becomes the Ordinary's PASSENGER, unable to stop or dismount it. On a standard bicycle one's feet could touch the ground to (inelegantly) brake their speed on a dirt road. But this being an Ordinary, once Mulga Bill sets off downhill with no previous experience riding one, he becomes a victim of his own hubris. There is no escaping his fate and he narrowly escapes death when his ride concludes with him sailing off of a precipice and crashes into a creek. Pride indeed came before Mulga's fall

The model for the character of Mulga Bill was William Henry Lewis (1880–1968), who knew Paterson in the vicinity of Bourke, New South Wales. Lewis had bought his bicycle as a result of a drought when there was no feed for horses.

== Legacy ==
Eaglehawk, Victoria—once a rural mining town, now part of greater Bendigo—was given as Mulga Bill's hometown ('Twas Mulga Bill, from Eaglehawk ...). This has been recognised with the development of the Mulga Bill Bicycle Trail, a scenic ride taking in many of the mining attractions, historic sites and modern-day amenities of Eaglehawk.

Mulga is a very common species of Acacia that predominates the interior regions of the Australian bush, and colloquially, it is an alternative term for the Bush itself or wilderness regions, for example ‘up the mulga’. This poem is extremely important to Australian culture because it includes the start of the cycling craze. In the time this poem was written, everyone was buying bicycles because it was (and still partly is) popular in Australia.

The poem has been set to music and the poem title was the name of a prominent Australian folk music group (also known as a bush band) in the 1970s.

The Mulga Bill Writing Award, an annual writing competition held in Bendigo, is named after the poem's titular character.
