= Edward Dyson =

Australian writer

Ted Dyson
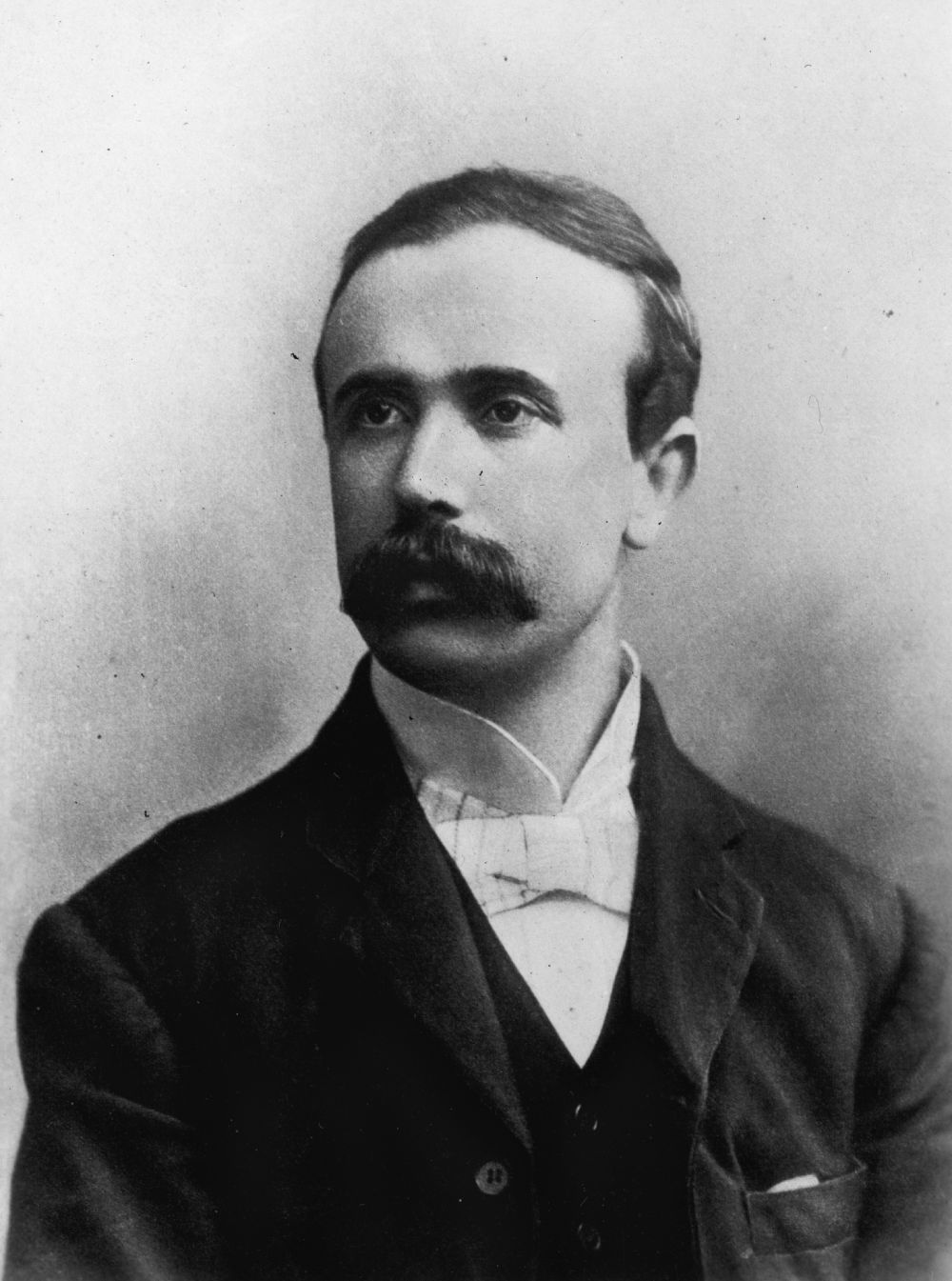
- Edward George Dyson, pre-1896
- Born: 4 March 1865; Ballarat, Victoria, Australia
- Died: 22 August 1931 (aged 66); Saint Kilda, Melbourne, Victoria, Australia
- Occupation: Short story writer
- Spouse: Dorothy Boyes (c. 1892–1975)
- Children: June (1917–)

Edward George Dyson (4 March 1865 – 22 August 1931) was an Australian journalist, poet, playwright and short story writer. He was the elder brother of illustrators Will Dyson (1880–1938) and Ambrose Dyson (1876–1913), with three sisters also of artistic and literary praise.

Dyson wrote under several – some say many – nom-de-plumes, including Silas Snell. In his day, the period of Australia's federation, the poet and writer was "ranked very closely to Australia's greatest short-story writer, Henry Lawson". With Lawson known as the "swagman poet", Ogilvie the "horseman poet", Dyson was the "mining poet". Although known as a freelance writer, he was also considered part of The Bulletin writer group.

== Early life ==
He was born at Morrison's Diggings near Ballarat in March 1865, to George Dyson and Jane, née Mayall. Brother Will would marry Ruby Lindsay while Ruby's brother Lionel would marry the Dyson sister Jean.

He was educated at the government schools in those towns until the age of thirteen. Whereas others his age were exploring the bush, he was examining abandoned mine shafts and associated buildings. He and his child friends would also be fossicking and re-washing hillsides.

At a 12-year-old he began to work as an assistant to a travelling draper (leading to the 1911 poem "Tommy the hawker") as well as various jobs "below and on top" in the Victorian and Tasmanian goldfields: Driving a whim horse at Ballarat, mining at Clunes and Bungaree, and panning shallow alluvial for gold at Lefroy, Tasmania, and on the Pinafore field, finding its largest nugget. His young working life also saw Dyson as a drover. Returning to Smeaton and Gordon, he was a trucker in a deep mine, then working in the battery building. About 1883 the family settled in South Melbourne, where he became a factory hand.

== Writing career ==
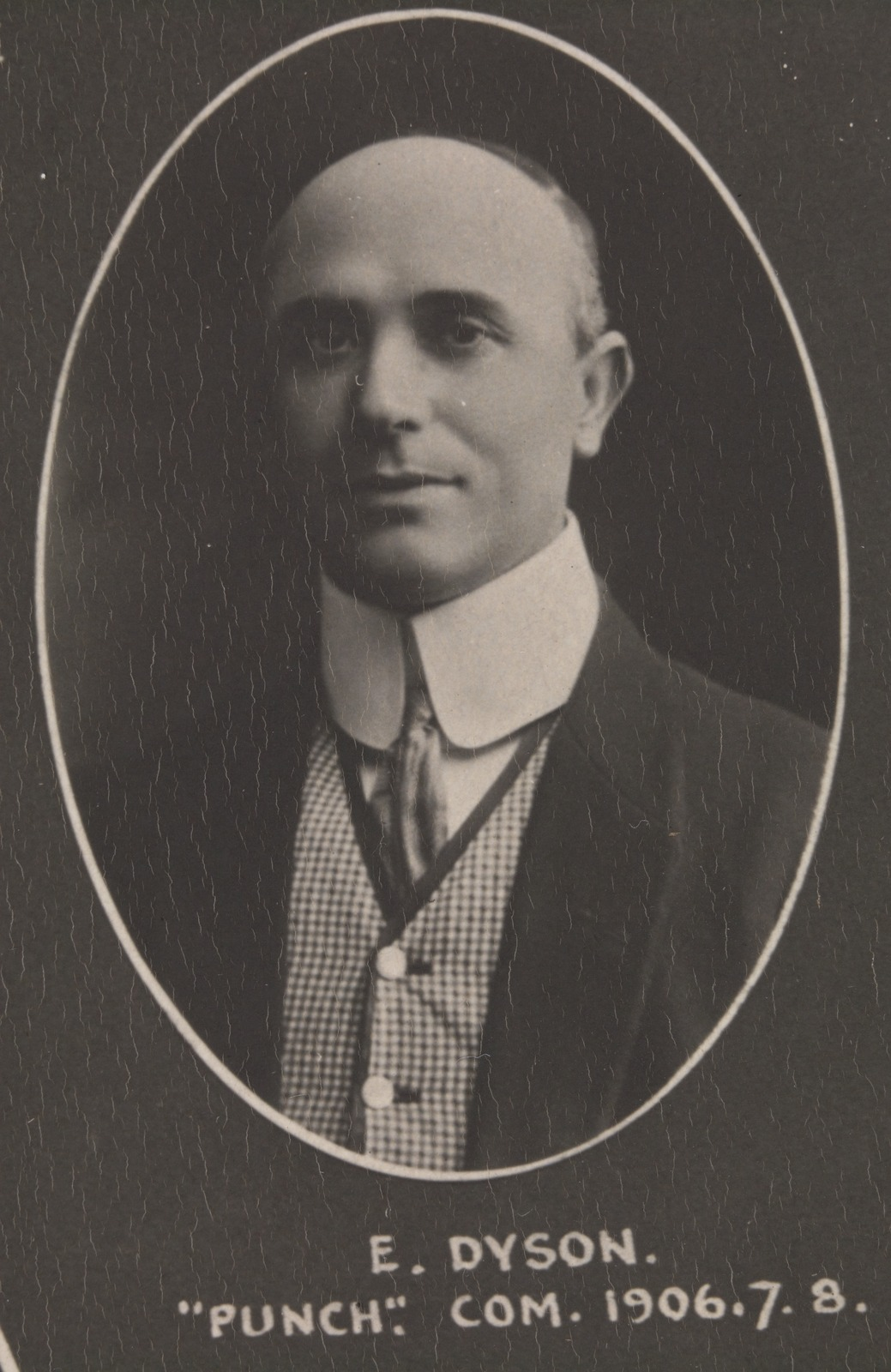
Dyson in 1908, Melbourne

At 19 years of age, Dyson wrote work that appeared in the Ballarat Courier. Themes were often derived from his childhood exposures to mining, and later working in a factory. He recorded many ideas and maintained a card index, that allowed him to reflect and refine the contents of his writing and produce such volumes.

He penned his first sketches, about mining, when arriving in Melbourne while working in the factory. This attracted the attention of J. F. Archibald, editor of The Bulletin. Acceptance of his writings allowed Dyson to leave the factory and earn his livelihood solely from his stories, verses, and paragraphs. His first real success came in 1889 when his short story A golden shanty was used as the title-piece in The Bulletin's Christmas anthology. His play The Golden Shanty was first performed in Sydney on 30 August 1913, produced by Bert Bailey. The early 1890s also saw Dyson investing his savings into a weekly publication, The Bull Ant, produced with later-member of parliament Randolph Bedford (1868–1941) and cartoonist Tom Durkin (1853–1902). He was forced to close the paper after a Constable Cornelius Crowe successfully sued him for libel after being depicted cheerfully bludgeoning to death a helpless drunk.

The year 1893 saw Dyson side with Lawson in a poetry slam on Banjo Paterson's bush idealism, as part of the Bulletin Debate, where he submitted the poem "The Fact of the Matter", which was later reworded and renamed "The drovers in reply".

In 1896 he published his only book of verse, a volume of poems, Rhymes from the Mines and Other Lines and, in 1898, the first collection of his short stories, Below and on top. The first book, Rhymes, was compared lesser with the recent first books of Paterson and Lawson, as his characters were not particularly Australian in identity and his broader humour. His writings today are one of the few recordings in verse of Australia's mining life (such as "The trucker" and "Cleaning up").

This comedy, Fact'ry 'Ands, was made into a stage production by 1916.

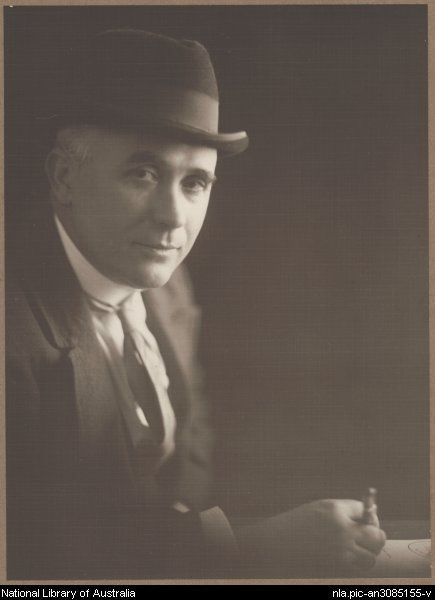
Dyson circa 1927

Hello, Soldier!, appeared in mid-March 1919. It was to the point of publication in January 1919, a few months before Dyson's personal health significantly impacted his capability to work due to the global Spanish flu. The anthology was well received as showing "his remarkable ability in seizing the soldier's point of view, and his dexterous use of language, plain and colored".

Dyson was influenced by The Bulletin stable of writers – of which he also became – included Victor Daley, Lawson, and Paterson. It was said:

although many of his characters are sketchy, there are some notable exceptions which, by reason of their strong humanity, remain as fixed in the reader's mind as the best of Lawson's. He later contributed to the Bulletin and Melbourne Punch stories of factory life in Melbourne. A mixture of humour, straight farce, and not a little pathos, these were entirely different from his earlier work, and, when published later in "Fact'ry 'Ands," "The Missing Link," and "Tommy the Hawker," etc., although they proved good sellers, they did little to enhance his literary reputation, which must stand or fall by virtue of his mining yarns.

It was considered despite earnest work, his was a "lesser talent" in comparison to Lawson and Paterson. Dyson also did not rank in the top twelve of the 1914 Melbourne's Herald ballot of Australia's one hundred and ten favourite poets. (Note: The 1914 Melbourne's Herald ballot ranked the top twelve of one hundred and ten favourite Australian poets as: 1st Adam Lindsay Gordon, Henry Kendall, Bernard O'Dowd, Victor Daley, Henry Lawson, Banjo Paterson, Will H. Ogilvie, James Brunton Stephens, Roderic Quinn, Mary Gilmore, George Essex Evans, E. J. Brady. (Barrier Miner newspaper, 29 July 1914, p. 6 (http://nla.gov.au/nla.news-article45290156))) His writing style whilst generally humorous, farcical or with exaggeration, tended to be laboured. He credited artist Louis Bradley as his mentor, and Archibald as his "Macaenas". Through his life Dyson's contributions included the Ballarat Courier, Tid-Bits, Life, Punch, The Bulletin, Age, Argus, Leader, Antipodean and the Cosmos.

Dyson did an enormous amount of work for many years until he broke down under the strain.

== Later life ==
In 1896 aged 31, Dyson leapt into the Yarra River to save an individual's life, indicating the physique of the former miner. In 1914 aged 49, he married twenty-two-year-old Dorothy Boyes, who was described as "one of the beauties of Melbourne, and has attained some prominence as a composer". Boyes had previously put one of Dyson's works to music.

By 1923 Edward Dyson was feeling weakened from an appendicitis operation, which only added to his long illness resulting from the Australian 1919 influenza pandemic. His sister-in-law Ruby Lindsay, and an illustrator for his 1919 book, died during that global influenza outbreak on 12 March 1919. Dyson died, aged 66, at his home at 94 Tennyson Street, Saint Kilda, on Saturday 22 August 1931, and was cremated. His wife Dorothy survived him with their one daughter June, aged 14. With his passing it was noted:

At present there is in the course of development a new school of writers, more polished, more in touch with world literature; but sometimes one regrets that they are not as close to the heart of their country as were the old bush story tellers.

== Bibliography ==
Some of his books were illustrated by his brother Will, a noted caricaturist.

=== Novels ===
- In the Roaring Fifties (1906)
- The Missing Link (1908)
- Tommy Minogue (1908)
- Tommy the Hawker and Snifter his Dog (1911)
- Loves of Lancelot (1914)
- The Escapades of Ann (1919)
- The Grey Goose Comedy Company (1922)

=== Short story collections ===
- Below and On Top (1898)
- Fact'ry 'ands (1906) (also a play)
- Benno and Some of the Push: Being Further 'Fact'ry 'ands' Stories (1911), published by the Railway Bookstall Company
- The Golden Shanty (1911)
- Spats' Fact'ry : More fact'ry 'ands (1914)

=== Major short stories ===
- "The Golden Shanty" (1887)
- "The Funerals of Malachi Mooney" (1900)

=== Poetry collections ===
- Rhymes from the Mines and Other Lines (1896)
- 'Hello, Soldier!': Khaki verse (1919), thirty-seven poems, printed on brown paper, with illustrations from Will Dyson, Ruby Lind, (Note: Ruby Lindsay in 1909 married Ted's brother Will Dyson. Ruby also died on 12 March 1919 as part of the global influenza pandemic, one week prior to the release of the book of verse Hello, Soldier!.) and George Dancey

==== Selected list of poems ====
Title	Year	First published	Reprinted/collected in
"Cleaning Up"	1892	The Bulletin, 4 June 1892	Rhymes from the Mines and Other Lines, Angus and Robertson, 1896, pp.23-25
"The Old Whim Horse"	1892	The Bulletin, 30 July 1892	Rhymes from the Mines and Other Lines, Angus and Robertson, 1896, pp.19-22
"The Fact of the Matter"	1892	The Bulletin, 30 July 1892	Not collected
"Peter Simson's Farm"	1896	The Argus, 22 February 1896	Rhymes from the Mines and Other Lines, Angus and Robertson, 1896, pp.117-122

Others

- "The Worked-Out Mine" (1889)
- "The Trucker" (1890)
- "Struck It At Last" (1892)
- "When the Bell Blew Up" (1893)
- "The Rescue" (1894)
- "Bullocky Bill and His Old Red Team" (1895)
- "When Father Petree Prayed : A Recollection" (1895)
- "A Friendly Game of Football" (1896)
- "Men of Australia" (1898)
- "At the Football Match: Last Saturday" (1897)
- "The Letters of the Dead" (1915)
- "Hello, Soldier!" (1918)
