= John Le Gay Brereton =

Australian poet, critic and professor

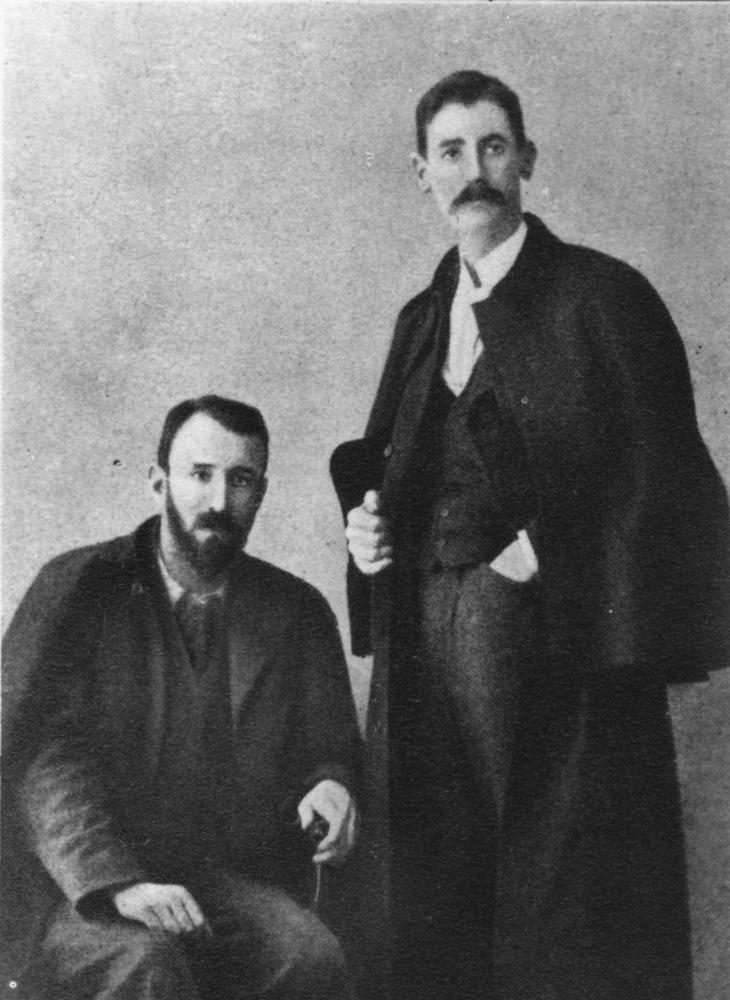
John Le Gay Brereton (sitting) with Henry Lawson in 1897.

John Le Gay Brereton (2 September 1871 – 2 February 1933) was an Australian poet, critic and professor of English at the University of Sydney. He was the first president of the Fellowship of Australian Writers when it was formed in Sydney in 1928.

== Early life ==
Brereton was born in Sydney, the fifth son of John Le Gay Brereton (1827–1886) and his wife Mary, née Tongue. His parents had travelled on the Dover Castle from England, arriving in Melbourne on 25 July 1859 and then moved to Sydney. The younger Brereton was educated at Sydney Grammar School from 1881 and the University of Sydney where he graduated BA (1894), reading English under Professor Sir Mungo MacCallum. He was editor of Hermes, the student literary annual, and became the university's chief librarian in 1915.

Brereton became a vegetarian in his youth and never lapsed throughout his life.

== Career ==
His edition of Lust's Dominion was sent to the Catholic University of Leuven, Belgium in 1914 but was thought lost in the German invasion; it was finally published there in 1931. So Long, Mick! a short one-act play in prose, was also published in 1931. Brereton contributed many letters and poems on diverse subjects to the Sydney Morning Herald, often under the pseudonym 'Basil Garstang'.

== Legacy ==
Brereton died on 2 February 1933 near Tamworth, New South Wales while on a caravan tour.

He was a close friend of and collaborator with Henry Lawson (whom he met in late 1894 through Mary Cameron, later Dame Mary Gilmore), and Christopher Brennan. For at least part of his life, he was a disciple of Annie Besant.

Brereton Park in East Ryde is named in his honour.

Brereton admitted to being profoundly affected by Christopher Marlowe and Walt Whitman, and several of his emotionally intense poems addressed to men, such as 'Cling To Me' ("Cling to me, love, and dare not let me go; Kiss me as though it were our time to die, And all our comradeship had drifted by...Over our love what shelter can I throw?"), have been anthologised in collections of homosexual verse, including Australian Gay and Lesbian Writing: An Anthology (1993), Sexual Heretics: Male homosexuality in English literature from 1850 to 1900 (1970), and The Penguin Book of Homosexual Verse (1983).

== Bibliography ==
- The Song of Brotherhood, and Other Verses (1896)
- Landlopers (1899)
- Sea and Sky (1908)
- The Burning Marl (1919)
- Swags up! (1928)
- Knocking Round (1930)
- Henry Lawson, by his Mates, ed. (1931)
