= Alan Wood (author) =

British-Australian author (1914–1957)

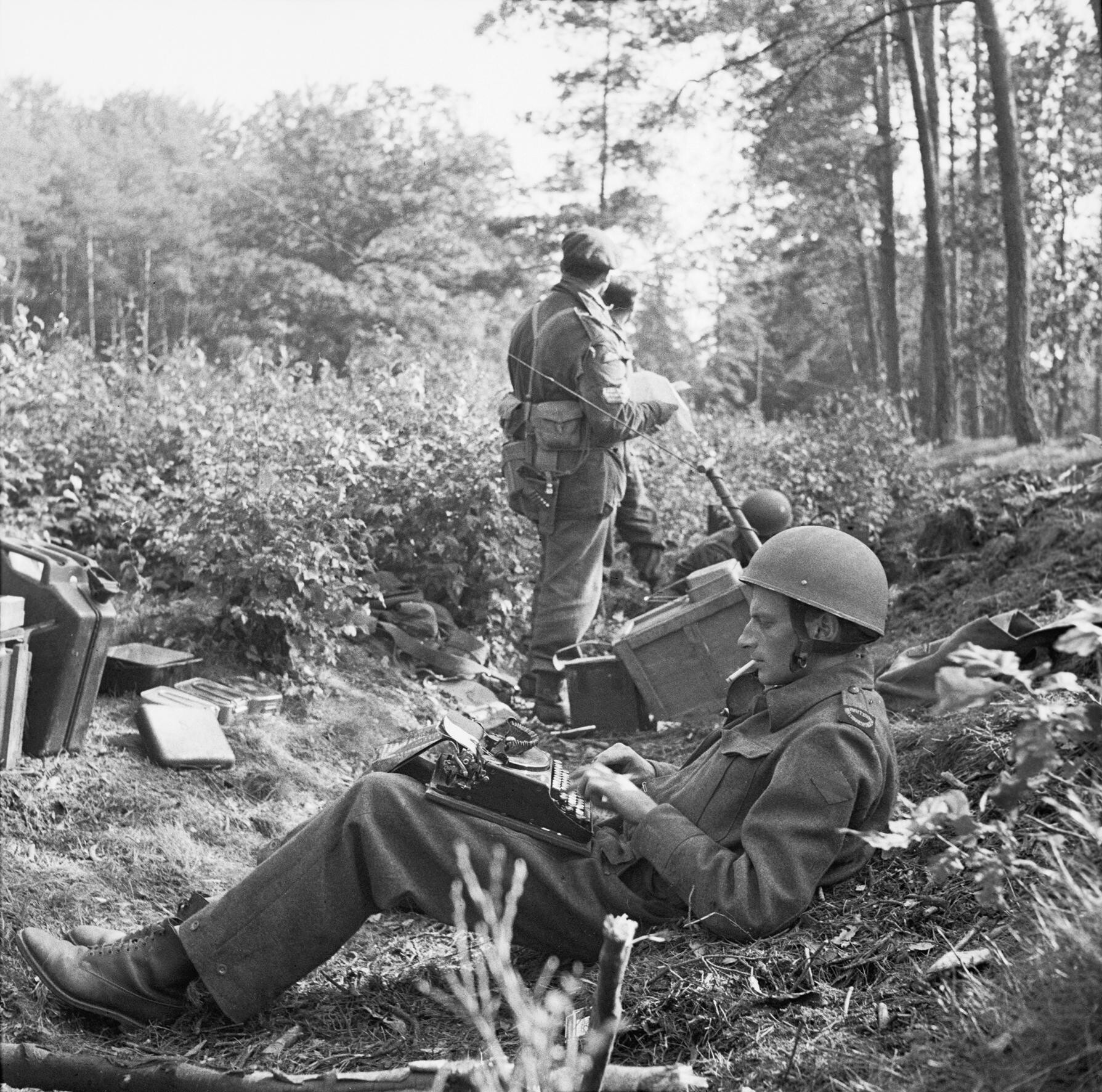
Wood, as war correspondent for the Daily Express, during the Battle of Arnhem in September 1944

Alliott Alan Whitfeld Wood (6 October 1914 – 27 October 1957) was an Australian-born British journalist, soldier, war correspondent, and author.

== Early life ==
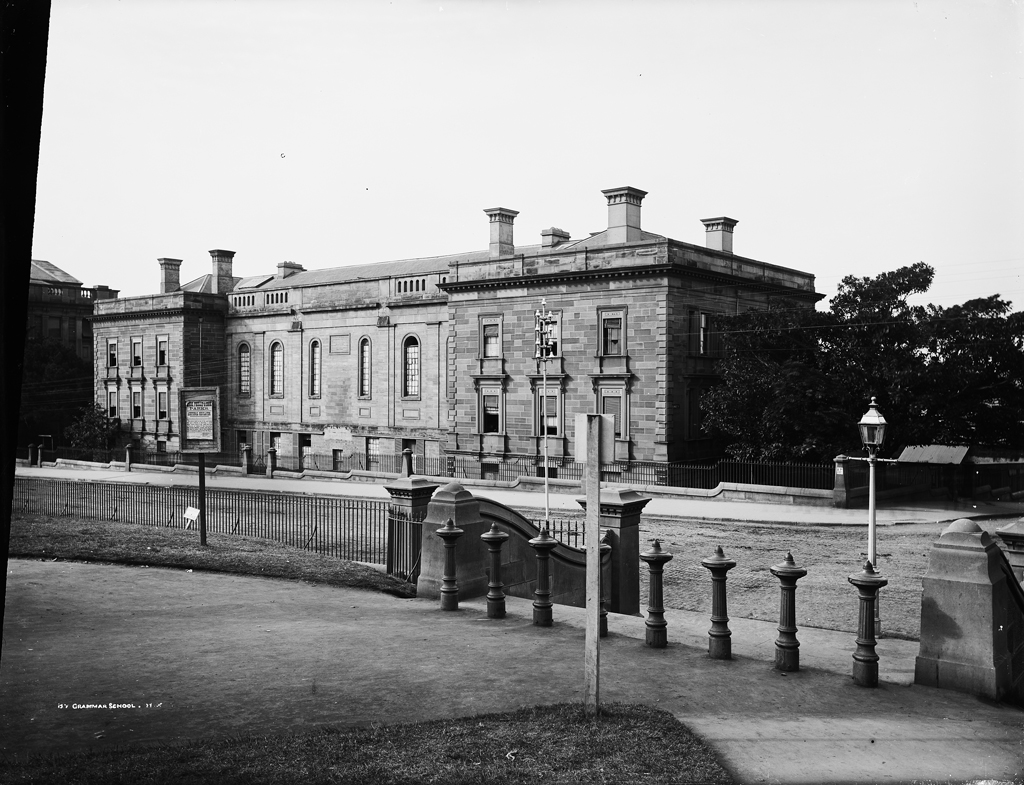
Sydney Grammar School, early 20th century

Born in Chatswood, New South Wales, a suburb of the Lower North Shore of Sydney, Australia, Wood was the son of George Arnold Wood, a historian, and his wife Madeline Whitfeld. His older brother Frederick Wood later became professor of history at Victoria University College in Wellington, New Zealand.

Wood was educated at Sydney Grammar School, then at the University of Sydney, and finally from 1935 to 1938 at Balliol College, Oxford, his father's and brother's old college, where his subject was philosophy. In his final term, he was elected as President of the Oxford Union, defeating the future British prime minister Edward Heath and remaining in Oxford to serve as President in the Michaelmas term. He was the first Australian to be so elected.

While serving his term as President of the Union, Wood helped to organize the campaign of Sandie Lindsay, the Master of Balliol, for the 1938 Oxford by-election, at which Lindsay argued against Neville Chamberlain's Munich Agreement with Hitler in September.

== Career ==
In January 1939, soon after leaving Oxford, to his family's dismay Wood joined Lord Beaverbrook’s Daily Express as a leader-writer.

In the summer of 1940, after the end of the "Phoney War", Wood enlisted in the Royal Artillery as a volunteer and served as an anti-aircraft gunner during the London Blitz. He did not seek a commission, later noting "I remained happily in the ranks, partly for the reason that I preferred the company there, and partly because I knew I would make a very bad officer, and there are enough bad officers in the Army already." However, in February 1941 he was posted to a military intelligence unit "somewhere in the Middle East" and was commissioned as a Captain.

In 1942, under the pen name of "Boomerang", Wood published Bless 'em All: an analysis of the British Army, its morale, efficiency, and leadership, giving his view of the wartime British Army as seen from the ranks. Some readers suspected the book was by George Orwell, and Orwell wrote to B. H. Liddell Hart "No, I didn't write Bless 'em All. I am not in the army because I am not physically fit... but I have been in the Home Guard from the beginning and could write a rather similar book about that."

Wood's General Staff Intelligence career was ended when it was discovered that he was the author of Bless 'em All, as the result of the unpublished manuscript having been found in his luggage at Singapore in July 1941. From there he had continued to Australia and visited his mother and his brother Bill.

In October 1943, Wood was in Sydney again, this time with Sir Walter Layton, chairman of the News Chronicle, and Samuel Storey, a Conservative member of parliament, as part of a "British newspaper mission" to Australia.

In the later stages of the war, Wood served as a war correspondent for the Daily Express. In June 1944, he was at the Normandy landings, then travelled with Canadian forces on the road to Falaise to capture Caen. He was at the Battle of Arnhem in September 1944. Also in 1944, James Proudfoot painted Wood's portrait, and the British Pathé film Art in Chelsea shows the work being done.

While taking part in the Allied advance into Germany in March 1945, Wood lost a leg from an injury suffered in Operation Varsity. In writing about this some years later, his fellow war correspondent Leonard Gander called him "the bravest war reporter I ever met". Wood made a cameo appearance playing himself in a movie about the Battle of Arnhem, Theirs is the Glory (1946). He is seen sitting writing and talking in a foxhole.

After the war, with a newly-elected Labour government now in office, Wood approached John Strachey, the Minister of Food, and was hired to help establish a scheme to grow groundnuts in east Africa. He was appointed as an inspector and within a year he was in Kenya and Tanganyika to see the planned plantations. He went on to head the Information Unit of the Overseas Food Corporation, but departed after exposing the Tanganyika groundnut scheme, on which he wrote The Groundnut Affair (1950). In March 1950, in the House of Commons John Boyd-Carpenter asked the Minister of Food to make a statement about attempts by Leslie Plummer, head of the Overseas Food Corporation, to stop the publication of the book.

Wood wrote a biography of his friend the philosopher Bertrand Russell, which was published in May 1957. In his review of this biography, A. J. Ayer found that Wood had been over-awed by Russell and noted that he was then working on a study of Russell's philosophy. A few months later, Wood killed himself, and the elderly Russell wrote an obituary of him for The Times.

The study of Russell's philosophy by Wood was published as an appendix to My Philosophical Development (1959).

Wood's major work The True History of Lord Beaverbrook was published posthumously by Heinemann in 1965, after the death of Beaverbrook in 1964, with a postscript by Sir John Elliot. Even then, some parts of the book were suppressed.

== Personal life ==
At Holborn in September 1946, Wood married a fellow journalist, Winifred Mary Seaton Jones. On 21 September, they boarded RMS Strathmore, bound for Sydney, Australia, giving their address as 12, Ridgmount Gardens, London WC1. Together, they later wrote Islands in Danger (1955) about the German occupation of the Channel Islands.

Wood was found to have an incurable brain disorder and died at the Atkinson Morley Hospital, Wimbledon on 27 October 1957, aged 43. Mary Wood wrote to Bertrand Russell that he had had Parkinson's disease and had killed himself. At the time of his death, his home address was 8, Queens Gate Place, South Kensington, and probate on his estate valued at £7,492 was granted to his widow on 10 January 1958.

Mary Wood died on 12 January 1958 at St Mary Abbots Hospital, Kensington, aged 39. In a front page story, the Kensington News reported that the Coroner for Hammersmith had "returned a verdict of suicide whilst under considerable mental stress on Mrs Winifred Mary Wood, 39-year-old widow of author Alliot Allen Whitfield Wood", and the Kensington Post added that following the death of her husband in October she had often been depressed. She left behind their two young sons, Jonathan and David.

A trust fund for the two Wood boys was organized by R. W. G. Mackay, a fellow-Australian. They were to be brought up by Evanne Garnsey, Alan Wood's sister, and her husband David Garnsey, headmaster of Canberra Grammar School, who in 1959 became the Anglican Bishop of Gippsland. As of 2025, David Wood is an associate professor in the School of Law at the University of Melbourne.

== Selected works ==
- "Boomerang", Bless 'em All: an analysis of the British Army, its morale, efficiency, and leadership (London: Secker & Warburg, 1942)
- Alan Wood, The Falaise Road (Toronto: Macmillan, 1944)
- Alan Wood, The Groundnut Affair (London: Bodley Head, 1950)
- Alan Wood, Herbert: a complete fiction (London: The Bodley Head, 1951), a novel
- Alan Wood, Mr Rank: a study of J. Arthur Rank and British Films (London: Hodder & Stoughton, 1952)
- Mary & Alan Wood, eds., Silver Spoon: Memoirs of Lord Grantley (London: Hutchinson, 1954)
- Alan Wood and Mary Seaton Wood, Islands in Danger: the first full story of the German occupation of the Channel Islands (London: Evans, 1955)
- Alan Wood, Flying Visits (Dennis Dobson, 1956)
- Alan Wood, Bertrand Russell: The Passionate Skeptic (London: George Allen & Unwin, 1957)
- Alan Wood, "Russell's philosophy", in Bertrand Russell, My Philosophical Development (1959)
- Alan Wood, The True History of Lord Beaverbrook (Heinemann, 1965)
