= Colloquialism =

Linguistic style used for casual communication

Colloquialism (also called colloquial language, everyday language, or general parlance) is the linguistic style used for casual (informal) communication. It is the most common functional style of speech, the language normally employed in casual conversation and other informal contexts. Colloquialism is characterized by the frequent use of expressive phrases, idioms, anthropocentrism, and a lack of specialized focus, and may have rapidly changing lexicon. It can also be distinguished by its usage of formulations with incomplete logical and syntactic ordering.

A specific instance of such language is termed a colloquialism. The most common terms used in dictionaries to label such expressions are colloquial and informal.

== Definition ==
Colloquialism is distinct from formal speech or formal writing. It is a form of language that speakers typically use when they are relaxed and inattentive to their own diction (choices of vocabulary and style of expression). An expression is labeled colloq. for "colloquial" in dictionaries when a different expression is preferred in formal usage, but this does not mean that the colloquial expression is necessarily slang or non-standard.

Some colloquial language contains a great deal of slang, but some contains no slang at all. Slang is often used in colloquial speech, but this particular register is restricted to particular in-groups, and it is not a necessary element of colloquialism. Other examples of colloquial usage in English include contractions or profanity.

"Colloquial" should be distinguished from "non-standard". The difference between standard and non-standard is not strictly connected to the difference between formal and colloquial. As shown by Peter Trudgill in his discussion of standard English, formal, colloquial, and vulgar language are more a matter of stylistic variation and diction, rather than of the standard and non-standard dichotomy. However, the term "colloquial" may be equated with "non-standard" at times, in certain contexts and terminological conventions.

In the philosophy of language, "colloquial language" is ordinary natural language, as distinct from specialized forms used in logic or other areas of philosophy. In the field of logical atomism, meaning is evaluated in a different way than with more formal propositions.

== Colloquial names ==
A colloquial name or familiar name is a name or term commonly used to identify a person or thing in non-specialist language, in place of another usually more formal or technical name. They are not slang nor vulgar, but are informal. This type is speech is used broadly for a variety of topics.

In biology, colloquial names are called "common names". Common pests often have common names. For example, armadillidiidae are often called "rollie pollies", while fly larvae are frequently called "maggots".

In medicine, types of musculoskeletal injuries and fractures have colloquial names. For example, the lateral epicondylitis injury is colloquially referred to as "tennis elbow".

In professional environments, colloquialisms often incorporate figures of speech. For example, when counter-arguing why an action ought not be performed, one may colloquially ask "why in God's name not?"

== Distinction from other styles ==
Colloquialisms are distinct from slang or jargon. Slang refers to words used only by specific social groups, such as demographics based on region, age, or socio-economic identity. In contrast, jargon is most commonly used within specific occupations, industries, activities, or areas of interest. Colloquial language includes slang, along with abbreviations, contractions, idioms, turns-of-phrase, and other informal words and phrases known to most native speakers of a language or dialect.

Jargon is terminology that is explicitly defined in relationship to a specific activity, profession, or group. The term refers to the language used by people who work in a particular area or who have a common interest. Similar to slang, it is shorthand used to express ideas, people, and things that are frequently discussed between members of a group. Unlike slang, it is often developed deliberately. While a standard term may be given a more precise or unique usage amongst practitioners of relevant disciplines, it is often reported that jargon is a barrier to communication for those people unfamiliar with the respective field.

== See also ==
- Eye dialect
- Oral history
- Vernacular
