= Logical holism =

Philosophical theory

In philosophy, logical holism is the belief that the world operates in such a way that no part can be known without the whole being known first.

Bertrand Russell concluded that "Hegel's dialectical logical holism should be dismissed in favour of the new logic of propositional analysis." and introduced a form of logical atomism.

== See also ==
- Doctrine of internal relations
- Semantic holism
