= George Arnold Wood =

English Australian historian (1865–1928)

George Arnold Wood (7 June 1865 – 14 October 1928) was an English Australian historian notable for writing an early work on Australian history entitled The Discovery of Australia.

Throughout his career Wood wrote for the Manchester Guardian, supporting Irish Home Rule and opposing Imperial Federation.

He married Eleanor Madeline Whitfeld, and had three sons and a daughter. One of his sons was the journalist Alan Wood, while another was Frederick Wood, professor of history at Victoria University College in Wellington, New Zealand.
