= Frederick Wood (historian) =

New Zealand historian and university professor

Freddie Wood CMG
- Born: Frederick Lloyd Whitfeld Wood; 29 September 1903; Sydney, New South Wales, Australia
- Died: 11 September 1989 (aged 85); Wellington, New Zealand
- Education: Sydney University; Balliol College, Oxford
- Scientific career
- Fields: History
- Notable students: Patrick White

Frederick Lloyd Whitfeld Wood CMG (29 September 1903 – 11 September 1989) was a notable New Zealand historian and university professor.

== Biography ==
He was born in Sydney, New South Wales, Australia in 1903. His father was George Arnold Wood who taught history at the University of Sydney. Wood Jr. was educated at Sydney Grammar School, Sydney University, and Balliol College, Oxford. When he returned to Sydney, he privately tutored the later Nobel-laureate Patrick White.

On 23 January 1932, he married a teacher, Joan Myrtle Walter, at Blackheath, New South Wales. In 1935, a committee of the Victoria University College recommended that John Cawte Beaglehole chair their history department, but this was blocked for political reasons. The position was offered to Wood instead. Wood spent the rest of his academic career at Victoria University of Wellington and was a contributor to the Official History of New Zealand in the Second World War 1939–45, writing a volume on political issues in New Zealand during the Second World War. He retired from teaching in 1969.

In 1953, Wood was awarded the Queen Elizabeth II Coronation Medal. He was appointed a Companion of the Order of St Michael and St George in the 1974 New Year Honours, for services to scholarship and Victoria University. He died at his home on 11 September 1989. His papers are held at Victoria University.

== Bibliography ==
- Wood, Frederick Lloyd Whitfeld (1940). New Zealand in the World. Wellington: Department of Internal Affairs.
- Wood, Frederick Lloyd Whitfeld (1958). Political and External Affairs. Wellington: Department of Internal Affairs.
