= Logical atomism =

Analytical philosophical view expounded by Bertrand Russell

Logical atomism is a philosophical view that originated in the early 20th century with the development of analytic philosophy. It holds that the world consists of ultimate logical "facts" (or "atoms") that cannot be broken down any further, each of which can be understood independently of other facts.

Its principal exponent was the British philosopher Bertrand Russell. It is also widely held that the early works (Note: This includes both the Tractatus Logico-Philosophicus and Wittgenstein's pre-Tractarian writings.) of his Austrian-born pupil and colleague, Ludwig Wittgenstein, defend a version of logical atomism, though he went on to reject it in his later Philosophical Investigations. (Note: See especially Philosophical Investigations §§46–49, §81, §91).) Some philosophers in the Vienna Circle were also influenced by logical atomism (particularly Rudolf Carnap, who was deeply sympathetic to some of its philosophical aims, especially in his earlier works). Gustav Bergmann developed a form of logical atomism that focused on an ideal phenomenalistic language, particularly in his discussions of J. O. Urmson's work on analysis.

The name for this kind of theory was coined in March 1911 by Russell, in a work published in French titled "Le Réalisme analytique" (published in translation as "Analytic Realism" in Volume 6 of The Collected Papers of Bertrand Russell). Russell was developing and responding to what he called "logical holism"—i.e., the belief that the world operates in such a way that no part can be known without the whole being known first. This belief is related to monism, and is associated with the absolute idealism which was dominant in Britain at the time. The criticism of monism seen in the works of Russell and his colleague G. E. Moore can therefore be seen as an extension of their criticism of absolute idealism, particularly as it appeared in the works of F. H. Bradley and J. M. E. McTaggart. Logical atomism can thus be understood as a developed alternative to logical holism, or the "monistic logic" of the absolute idealists.

== Origin ==
As mentioned above, the term "logical atomism" was first coined by Russell in 1911. However, since the paper in which it was first introduced was published only in French during Russell's lifetime, the view was not widely associated with Russell in the English-speaking world until Russell gave a series of lectures in early 1918 under the title "The Philosophy of Logical Atomism". These lectures were subsequently published in 1918 and 1919 in The Monist (Volumes 28 and 29), which at the time was edited by Phillip Jourdain. Russell's ideas as presented in 1918 were also influenced by Wittgenstein, as he explicitly acknowledges in his introductory note. This has partly contributed to the widely-held view that Wittgenstein was also a logical atomist, as has Wittgenstein's atomistic metaphysics developed in the Tractatus.

However, logical atomism has older roots. Russell and Moore broke themselves free from British Idealism in the 1890s. And Russell's break developed along its own logical and mathematical path. His views on philosophy and its methods were heavily influenced by revolutionary nineteenth-century mathematics developed by figures like Cantor, Dedekind, Peano, and Weierstrass. As he says in his 1901 essay, republished in his 1917 collection Mysticism and Logic, and Other Essays under the title "Mathematics and the Metaphysicians":

What is now required is to give the greatest possible development to mathematical logic, to allow to the full the importance of relations, and then to found upon this secure basis a new philosophical logic, which may hope to borrow some of the exactitude and certainty of its mathematical foundation. If this can be successfully accomplished, there is every reason to hope that the near future will be as great an epoch in pure philosophy as the immediate past has been in the principles of mathematics. Great triumphs inspire great hopes; and pure thought may achieve, within our generation, such results as will place our time, in this respect, on a level with the greatest age of Greece. (pg. 96)

With the operations of the calculus of relations as atoms or indefinables (primitive notions), Russell described logicism, or mathematics as logic, in The Principles of Mathematics (1903). Russell thought the revolutionary mathematical work could, through the development of relations, produce a similar revolution in philosophy. This ambition overlays the character of Russell's work from 1900 onward. Russell believes in fact that logical atomism, fully carried out and implemented throughout philosophy, is the realization of his 1901 ambition. As he says in the 1911 piece where he coins the phrase "logical atomism":

The true method, in philosophy as in science, should be inductive, meticulous, respectful of detail, and should reject the belief that it is the duty of each philosophy to solve all problems by himself. It is this method which has inspired analytic realism [a.k.a. logical atomism], and it is the only method, if I am not mistaken, with which philosophy will succeed in obtaining results as solid as those obtained in science. (pg. 139)

Logical atomism rightly makes logic central to philosophy. In doing so, it makes philosophy scientific, at least in Russell's view. As he says in his 1924 "Logical Atomism":

The technical methods of mathematical logic, as developed in this book [Principia Mathematica], seem to me very powerful, and capable of providing a new instrument for the discussion of many problems that have hitherto remained subject to philosophical vagueness.

In summary, Russell thought that a moral of the revolutionary work in mathematics was this: equally revolutionary work in philosophy could occur, if we only make logic the essence of philosophizing. This aspiration lies at the origin, and motivates and runs through, logical atomism.

== Principles ==
Russell referred to his atomistic doctrine as contrary to the tier "of the people who more or less follow Hegel" (PLA 178).

The first principle of logical atomism is that the World contains "facts". The facts are complex structures consisting of objects ("particulars"). A fact may be that an object has a property or that it stands in some relation to other objects. In addition, there are judgments ("beliefs"), which are in a relationship to the facts, and by this relationship either true or false.

According to this theory, even ordinary objects of daily life "are apparently complex entities". According to Russell, words like "this" and "that" are used to denote particulars. In contrast, ordinary names such as "Socrates" actually are definitive descriptions. In the analysis of "Plato talks with his pupils", "Plato" needs to be replaced with something like "the man who was the teacher of Aristotle".

In 1905, Russell had already criticized Alexius Meinong, whose theories led to the paradox of the simultaneous existence and non-existence of fictional objects. This theory of descriptions was crucial to logical atomism, as Russell believed that language mirrored reality.

=== Russell's principles ===
Bertrand Russell's theory of logical atomism consists of three interworking parts: the atomic proposition, the atomic fact, and the atomic complex. An atomic proposition, also known as an elemental judgement, is a fundamental statement describing a single entity. Russell refers to this entity as an atomic fact, and recognizes a range of elements within each fact that he refers to as particulars and universals. A particular denotes a signifier such as a name, many of which may apply to a single atomic fact, while a universal lends quality to these particulars, e.g. color, shape, disposition. In Russell's Theory of Acquaintance, awareness and thereby knowledge of these particulars and universals comes through sense data. Every system consists of many atomic propositions and their corresponding atomic facts, known together as an atomic complex. In respect to the nomenclature that Russell used for his theory, these complexes are also known as molecular facts in that they possess multiple atoms. Rather than decoding the complex in a top-down manner, logical atomism analyzes its propositions individually before considering their collective effect. According to Russell, the atomic complex is a product of human thought and ideation that combines the various atomic facts in a logical manner.

Russell's perspective on belief proved a point of contention between him and Wittgenstein, causing it to shift throughout his career. In logical atomism, belief is a complex that possesses both true and untrue propositions. Initially, Russell plotted belief as the special relationship between a subject and a complex proposition. Later, he amended this to say that belief lacks a proposition, and instead associates with universals and particulars directly. Here, the link between psychological experience – sense data – and components of logical atomism – universals and particulars – causes a breach in the typical logic of the theory; Russell's logical atomism is in some respects defined by the crossover of metaphysics and analytical philosophy, which characterizes the field of naturalized epistemology.

In his theory of Logical Atomism, Russell posited the highly controversial idea that for every positive fact exists a parallel negative fact: a fact that is untrue. The correspondence theory maintains that every atomic proposition coordinates with exactly one atomic fact, and that all atomic facts exist. The Theory of Acquaintance says that for any given statement taking the form of an atomic proposition, we must be familiar with the assertion it makes. For example, in the positive statement, "the leaf is green," we must be acquainted with the atomic fact that the leaf is green, and we know that this statement corresponds to exactly this one fact. Along this same line, the complementary negative statement, "the leaf is not green," is clearly false given what we know about the color of the leaf, but our ability to form a statement of this nature means that a corresponding fact must exist. Regardless of whether the second statement is or isn't true, the connection between its proposition and a fact must itself be true. One central doctrine of Logical Atomism, known as the Logically Perfect Language Principle, enables this conclusion. This principle establishes that everything exists as atomic proposition and fact, and that all language signifies reality. In Russell's viewpoint, this necessitates the negative fact, whereas Wittgenstein maintained the more conventional Principle of Bivalence, in which the states "P" and "Not (P)" cannot coexist.

=== Wittgenstein's principles ===
In his Tractatus Logico-Philosophicus, Ludwig Wittgenstein explains his version of logical atomism as the relationship between proposition, state of affairs, object, and complex, often referred to as "Picture theory". In view of Russell's version, the propositions are congruent in that they are both clear statements about an atomic entity. Every atomic proposition is constructed from "names" that correspond to "objects", and the interaction of these objects generates "states of affairs," which are analogous to what Russell called atomic facts. Where Russell identifies both particulars and universals, Wittgenstein amalgamates these into objects for the sake of protecting the truth-independence of his propositions; a self-contained state of affairs defines each proposition, and the truth of a proposition cannot be proven by the sharing or exclusion of objects between propositions. In Russell's work, his concept of universals and particulars denies truth-independence, as each universal accounts for a specific set of particulars, and the exact matching of any two sets implies equality, difference implies inequality, and this acts as a qualifier of truth. In Wittgenstein's theory, an atomic complex is a layered proposition subsuming many atomic propositions, each representing its own state of affairs.

Wittgenstein's handling of belief was dismissive and reflects his abstention from the epistemology that concerned Russell. Because his theory dealt with understanding the nature of reality, and because any item or process of the mind barring positive fact, i.e. something absolute and without interpretation, may become altered and thus divorced from reality, belief exists as a sign of reality but not reality itself. Wittgenstein was decidedly skeptical of epistemology, which tends to value unifying metaphysical ideas while depreciating the casewise and methodological inspection of philosophy that dominates his Tractatus Logico-Philosophicus. Furthermore, Wittgenstein concerned himself with defining the exact correspondence between language and reality wherein any explanation of reality that defies or overburdens these semantic structures, namely metaphysics, becomes unhinged. Wittgenstein's work bears the exact philosophical determinants that he openly dismissed, hence his later abandonment of this theory altogether.

=== Differences between Russell's and Wittgenstein's atomism ===
At the time Russell delivered his lectures on logical atomism, he had lost contact with Wittgenstein. After World War I, Russell met with Wittgenstein again and helped him publish the Tractatus Logico Philosophicus, Wittgenstein's own version of Logical Atomism.

Although Wittgenstein did not use the expression Logical Atomism, the book espouses most of Russell's logical atomism except for Russell's Theory of Knowledge (T 5.4 and 5.5541). By 1918 Russell had moved away from this position. Nevertheless, the Tractatus differed so fundamentally from the philosophy of Russell that Wittgenstein always believed that Russell misunderstood the work.

The differences relate to many details, but the crucial difference is in a fundamentally different understanding of the task of philosophy. Wittgenstein believed that the task of philosophy was to clean up linguistic mistakes. Russell was ultimately concerned with establishing sound epistemological foundations. Epistemological questions such as how practical knowledge is possible did not interest Wittgenstein. Wittgenstein investigated the "limits of the world" and later on meaning. For Wittgenstein, metaphysics and ethics were nonsensical - as they did not "speak of facts" - though he did not mean to devalue their importance in life by describing them in this way. Russell, on the other hand, believed that these subjects, particularly ethics, though belonging not to philosophy nor science and possessing an inferior epistemological foundation, were not only of certain interest, but also meaningful.

== Influence and decline ==
The immediate effect of the Tractatus was enormous, particularly by the reception it received by the Vienna Circle. However, it is now claimed by many contemporary analytic philosophers, that the Vienna Circle misunderstood certain sections of the Tractatus. The indirect effect of the method, however, was perhaps even greater long-term, especially on logical positivism. Wittgenstein eventually rejected the "atomism" of logical atomism in his posthumously published book, Philosophical Investigations, and it is still debated whether or not he ever held the wide-ranging version that Russell expounded in his 1918 logical atomism lectures. Russell, on the other hand, never abandoned logical atomism. In his 1959 My Philosophical Development, Russell said that his philosophy evolved and changed many times in his life, but he described all these changes as an "evolution" stemming from his original "revolution" into logical atomism in 1899-1900:

There is one major division in my philosophical work: in the years 1899-1900, I adopted the philosophy of logical atomism and the technique of Peano in mathematical logic. This was so great a revolution as to make my previous work, except such as was purely mathematical, irrelevant to everything that I did later. The change in these years was a revolution; subsequent changes have been of the nature of an evolution. (Chapter 1: "Introductory Outline")

Even into the 1960s, Russell claimed that he "rather avoided labels" in describing his views—with the exception of "logical atomism."

Philosophers such as Willard Van Orman Quine, Hubert Dreyfus and Richard Rorty went on to adopt logical holism.

== See also ==
- Logical positivism
- Philosophy of language
- Logic
- Ordinary language philosophy
- Theory of descriptions
- "On Denoting"
- Definitions of philosophy
