= My Philosophical Development =

1959 book by Bertrand Russell

- Cover of the first edition
- Author: Bertrand Russell
- Language: English
- Subject: Philosophy
- Publication date: 1959
- Publication place: United Kingdom
- Media type: Print (Hardcover and Paperback)

My Philosophical Development is a 1959 book by the philosopher Bertrand Russell, in which the author summarizes his philosophical beliefs and explains how they changed during his life.

== Summary ==
Russell gives an account of his philosophical development. He describes his Hegelian period and includes hitherto unpublished notes for a Hegelian philosophy of science. He deals next with the two-fold revolution involved with his abandonment of idealism and adoption of a mathematical logic founded upon that of Giuseppe Peano. After two chapters on Principia Mathematica (1910–1913), he passes to the problems of perception as dealt with in Our Knowledge of the External World (1914). In a chapter on "The Impact of Wittgenstein", Russell examines what he now thinks must be accepted and what rejected in that philosopher's work. He notes the changes from earlier theories required by the adoption of William James's view that sensation is not essentially relational and is not per se a form of knowledge. In an explanatory chapter, he endeavors to remove misconceptions of and objections to his theories as to the relation of perception to scientific knowledge. Russell concludes with a reprint of some articles on modern Oxford philosophy.

There is an appendix, "Russell's philosophy", by Alan Wood.
