= Doctrine of internal relations =

Philosophical doctrine that relations are internal to their bearers

The doctrine of internal relations is the philosophical doctrine that all relations are internal to their bearers, in the sense that they are essential to them and the bearers would not be what they are without them. It was a term used in British philosophy around in the early 1900s.

== Overview ==
Some relations are clearly internal in the sense that, for example, four would not be four unless it were related to two in the way it is. Some relations are internal to their bearers under one description but not under another, for example, a wife would not be a wife unless suitably related to a husband, but Mary would still be Mary had she not married. Or take the internal relation where Jack is taller than his wife, Joan. Here the relation is internal to both of them together; in symbolic form, it can be given as Jack(R)Joan, where R is the ordered relation of "taller than".

The doctrine that all relations are internal implies that everything has some relation, however distant, to everything else. Such a doctrine is ascribed by Bertrand Russell and G. E. Moore to certain ideas by Georg Wilhelm Friedrich Hegel and the American philosopher, C. S. Peirce. Russell associates it with pragmatism, objective idealism and the absolute idealism of Hegel. It also refers to coherentism, a holist approach to truth.

A contemporary of Russell, the English philosopher, Alfred North Whitehead, maintained the necessity of a doctrine of internal relations for the theory of evolution:

This material is in itself the ultimate substance. Evolution, on the materialistic theory, is reduced to the role of being another word for the description of the changes of the external relations between portions of matter. There is nothing to evolve, because one set of external relations is as good as any other set of external relations. There can merely be change, purposeless and unprogressive. But the whole point of the modern doctrine is the evolution of the complex organisms from antecedent states of less complex organisms. The doctrine thus cries aloud for a conception of organism as fundamental for nature. It also requires an underlying activity—a substantial activity—expressing itself in achievements of organism.

— Alfred North Whitehead, Science and the Modern World

== See also ==
- Bradley's regress
- Logical holism
