= Steelman and Smith =

Fictional characters in Henry Lawson stories

Steelman and Smith are two fictional characters appearing in a series of short stories by Australian writer Henry Lawson.

== Background ==
In 1893, Henry Lawson travelled to New Zealand, where he initially spent three months unemployed in Wellington, sleeping in a sewerage pipe. He then became a telegraph linesman on New Zealand's South Island, working in a team that was laying a cable between Picton and Dunedin. Lawson later described these times as among the happiest of his life. These experiences have been credited with inspiring his Steelman and Smith stories. It is reputed that the Steelman character was modelled on a "commercial traveller" that Lawson met during this period. Smith was partly a self-portrait, based, according to Lawson, on "the weaker side of myself."

== Description ==
Steelman and Smith are con-artists living in New Zealand, described in one story as "professional wanderers." Steelman "survives on the sharpness of his wits", while Smith is his "dim-witted and naive offsider." Steelman is usually successful in his ruses, with the exception of the story "The Geological Spieler."

== Legacy ==
According to the Oxford Companion to Australian Literature, the Steelman character "is the focus for some of Lawson's best yarns and tall stories [but] lacks the complexity of other recurring characters in Lawson's fiction such as Jack Mitchell and Dave Regan." Dorothy Hewett described the pair as "outsiders journeying on a discovery of themselves and society."

The Steelman and Smith stories were adapted into "Steelman and Smith", an episode of the television series Lawson's Mates, which aired on ABC TV on 2 February 1980. The episode was adapted by Cliff Green and featured Steve Bisley. In February 1944, radio station 2GB adapted "Steelman's Pupil" into a radio drama narrated by Lloyd Berrell, along with several other Lawson stories.

== Bibliography ==
Story	First published	Collection	Notes	Ref.
"Steelman"	The Bulletin (January 19, 1895)	While the Billy Boils (1896)	only features Steelman	
"Steelman's Pupil"	The Bulletin (December 14, 1895)	While the Billy Boils (1896)		
"The Geological Spieler"		While the Billy Boils (1896)		
"An Oversight of Steelman’s"	The Bulletin (September 18, 1897)	On the Track (1900)		
"How Steelman told his Story"	The Bulletin (February 25, 1899)	On the Track (1900)		
"A Gentleman Sharper and Steelman Sharper"		Over the Sliprails (1900)		
