= Short Stories in Prose and Verse =

1894 short story and poetry collection by Henry Lawson

- Author: Henry Lawson
- Language: English
- Genre: Short story and poetry collection
- Publisher: Louisa Lawson
- Publication date: 1894
- Publication place: Australia
- Media type: Print
- Pages: 96 pp
- Preceded by: -
- Followed by: While the Billy Boils

Short Stories in Prose and Verse is an 1894 collection of short stories and poetry by the Australian writer Henry Lawson, published by his mother, Louisa Lawson, in 1894. It was the author's first collection.

The collection consists of 15 short stories and poems from a variety of sources.

== Contents ==
- "Rats" (short story)
- "A Narrow Escape" (short story)
- "Bush Cats" (short story)
- "Johnson, Alias Crow" (poem)
- "The Drover's Wife" (short story)
- "The Fire at Ross's Farm" (poem)
- "The Union Buries Its Dead" (short story)
- "A Typical Bush-Yarn" (short story)
- "The Bush Undertaker" (short story)
- "A Legend of Coo-ee Gully"(poem)
- "Macquarie's Mate" (short story)
- "When the Childer Come Home" (poem)
- "The Mystery of Dave Regan" (short story)
- "A Derry on a Cove" (poem)
- "Trouble on the Selection" (poem)

== Critical reception ==
A reviewer for The Worker (Brisbane) was not impressed with the book. "The title is a misnomer, for the volume is much more a collection of sketches than of stories. The book is a very small one; as the author himself says in the preface, it is more a pamphlet than a volume. The printing cannot be commended, and as for the illustrations, perhaps the kindest thing that could be said about them is that their absence would considerably enhance the value of the volume. We agree with Mr. Lawson in holding that Australian books should be produced by Australian printers, and duly appreciated by Australian readers. But that consummation will never be realised until Australian printers and publishers produce something superior to the book which lies before us. If Mr. Lawson becomes famous it will be in spite of his printer."

A note in The Bulletin called it "a poor little, badly-printed volume," but went on to urge all Australians to buy a copy "firstly, because the book is well worth it; secondly, because it is a characteristically Australian book, one of the few really original attempts towards an Australian literature; and, thirdly, because the author will be thereby encouraged to produce a bigger volume in better form—a form more worthy of his genius."

The Oxford Companion to Australian Literature called the volume "a poor production", which "nevertheless confirmed his growing reputation."

== Notes ==
The Preface to the volume states: "This is an attempt to publish, in Australia, a collection of sketches and stories at a time when everything Australian, in the shape of a book, must bear the imprint of a London publishing firm before our critics will condescend to notice it, and before the 'reading public' will think it worth its while to buy nearly so many copies as will pay for the mere cost of printing a presentable volume."

== See also ==
- 1894 in Australian literature
