= His Father's Mate =

1888 short story by Henry Lawson

- Short story by Henry Lawson
- Country: Australia
- Language: English
- Genre: Humour

Publication
- Published in: The Bulletin
- Publication type: Periodical
- Media type: Print
- Publication date: 22 December 1888

"His Father's Mate" is a melodramatic short story by Henry Lawson. It was first published in the 22 December 1888 issue of The Bulletin, and later included in the author's short story collection, While the Billy Boils, and in many short story anthologies. It was the author's first published short story.

== Plot summary ==
Islay Mason is the narrator's father's mate, working on a goldfield stake. Mason is killed in a mine shaft collapse. Now the narrator arrives at the mine to help his father only to discover that his father, Tom, has also died.

== Further publications ==
- A Golden Shanty: Australian Stories and Sketches in Prose and Verse, Bulletin, 1890
- While the Billy Boils by Henry Lawson (1917)
- Modern Stories of the Open Air edited by John Charles Heywood Hatfield, J. M. Dent, 1936
- The Children's Lawson edited by Colin Roderick, Angus and Robertson, 1949
- The World of Henry Lawson edited by Walter Stone, Hamlyn, 1974
- The Essential Henry Lawson : The Best Works of Australia's Greatest Writer edited Brian Kiernan, Currey O'Neil, 1982
- Prose Works of Henry Lawson by Henry Lawson, Angus & Robertson, 1982
- A Campfire Yarn : Henry Lawson Complete Works 1885-1900 edited by Leonard Cronin, Lansdowne, 1984
- Henry Lawson's Mates: The Complete Stories of Henry Lawson, Viking, 1987

== Critical reception ==
While reviewing the anthology A Golden Shanty, a reviewer in The Daily Telegraph (Sydney) noted: "The touching story 'His Father's Mate,' by Henry Lawson, stands out distinctly as an excellent specimen of the kind of writing which Bret Harte set the world imitating in vain. Full of local color and pathetic suggestion, it is no unworthy copy of the great original."

Another critic writing about the author's short story collection While the Billy Boils in The Sydney Morning Herald found: "Reading such a sketch as 'His Father's Mate,' with its undeniable pathos and real power, one is more than inclined to think that the Australian life which Mr. Lawson has studied and lived has been coloured by a pessimism native to the writer; but the mounted trooper does or did enter largely into the chronicles of the Australian bush, and there is nothing improbable in the fate of the boy Islay as it is told here. The general effect of the sketch, however, is such an accumulation of fatalistic and crushing miseries as would make life unendurable, and it is doubtful if my effort after artistic effect justifies this. But Mr. Lawson is real, not artistic."

== Notes ==
- The Oxford Companion to Australian Literature states that the original story was revised before inclusion in the author's story collection While the Billy Boils.

== See also ==
- 1888 in Australian literature
