= The Fire at Ross's Farm =

Poem by Australian writer Henry Lawson

- by Henry Lawson
- Written: 1890
- First published in: The Bulletin
- Country: Australia
- Language: English
- Publication date: 6 December 1890

Full text
- The Fire at Ross's Farm at Wikisource

"The Fire at Ross's Farm" (1890) is a poem by Australian poet Henry Lawson.

It was originally published in The Bulletin on 6 December 1890 and subsequently reprinted in several of the author's other collections, other newspapers and periodicals and a number of Australian poetry anthologies.

== Critical reception ==
Writing about the "Inspiration of the Bush" in Australian verse, a critic in The Brisbane Courier noted that "the most graphic account of a bush-fire ever written is certainly that given in Lawson's 'Fire at Ross's Farm,' which is a masterpiece."

In an essay titled "'As only natives ride': Lawson's Adversity, Private Property and Australian Culture" writer Neil Boyack notes that the poem "catalogues aspects of a romanticised Australian identity: assumed mateship, hardy toughness, hearts of gold, a sense of fairness and adaptation to landscape. But through Lawson's simple, cut-to-the-bone prose and word power he creates harshness, uncertainty and a violence that at once dispels this romance."

== Publication history ==
After the poem's initial publication in The Bulletin it was reprinted as follows:

- Short Stories in Prose and Verse by Henry Lawson, L. Lawson, 1894
- In the Days When the World was Wide and Other Verses by Henry Lawson, Angus and Robertson, 1900
- The Children's Lawson edited by Colin Roderick, Angus and Robertson, 1949
- The Australian Christmas edited by Frank Cusack, Heinemann, 1966
- A Campfire Yarn : Henry Lawson Complete Works 1885-1900 edited by Leonard Cronin, Lansdowne, 1984
- Henry Lawson : An Illustrated Treasury edited by Glenys Smith, Lansdowne, 1985
- A Collection of Australian Bush Verse Peter Antill-Rose, 1989
- Family Ties : Australian Poems of the Family edited by Jennifer Strauss, Oxford University Press, 1998
- Classic Australian Verse edited by Maggie Pinkney, Five Mile Press, 2001

== See also ==
- 1890 in Australian literature
- 1890 in poetry
