= Joe Wilson (miniseries) =

- Based on: short stories by Henry Lawson
- Written by: Keith Dewhurst
- Directed by: Geoffrey Nottage
- Starring: Matthew Fargher; Kim Krejus; Tim Elliott
- Country of origin: Australia
- Original language: English
- No. of episodes: 3 x 2 hours

Production
- Producer: Alexandra Cann

Original release
- Network: Seven Network
- Release: 14 December – 16 December 1988

Joe Wilson is a 1988 mini series about Joe Wilson, based on the stories by Henry Lawson. Jack Thompson began as director but left after two weeks.

== Cast ==
- Matthew Fargher as Joe Wilson
- Kim Krejus as Mary Brand
- John Clayton as Dick
- Michael Caton as Dave Regan
- Alan David Lee as Jack Barnes
- Michele Fawdon as Hilda
- Antonia Kidman as Maggie Charlesworth
- Todd Boyce as Bob Black
- David Field as Billy Spicer
- Rob Carlton as Tommy Spicer
- Tim Elliott as Mr Black
- Kate Sheil as Mrs Black
- Reg Lye as Jimmy Nowlett
- Bill Hunter as Bill Galletley
- Hugh Keays-Byrne as Bob Galletley
- Terence Donovan as Mr Walls
- Brett Climo as Sam
- Sean Scully as Henry Lawson
