= The Drover's Wife =

The Drover's Wife may refer to:

- "The Drover's Wife" (short story), 1892 short story by Australian writer Henry Lawson
- The Drover's Wife (Drysdale), 1945 painting by Australian artist Russell Drysdale
- The Drover's Wife (play), 2016 play by Leah Purcell, loosely based on Lawson's short story
- The Drover's Wife: The Legend of Molly Johnson, 2019 novel by Leah Purcell
- The Drover's Wife (film) aka The Drover's Wife: The Legend of Molly Johnson, 2021 film by Leah Purcell
- The Drover's Wife (1984), short film by Sue Brooks

== See also ==
- The Drover's Wife (short story)#Cultural references
