= When I Was King and Other Verses =

1905 poetry collection by Henry Lawson

- Author: Henry Lawson
- Language: English
- Genre: Poetry collection
- Publisher: Angus and Robertson
- Publication date: 1905
- Publication place: Australia
- Media type: Print
- Pages: 270pp
- Preceded by: Joe Wilson's Mates
- Followed by: The Romance of the Swag

When I Was King and Other Verses (1905) is a collection of poetry by Australian poet and author Henry Lawson.

The original edition consisted of 76 poems, representing work that Lawson had published in the years since his previous major collection, Verses, Popular and Humorous, in 1900. The book's publisher, Angus and Robertson, also released the collection in two volumes later the same year, titled The Elder Son and When I Was King. These volumes were released under the publisher's Commonwealth Series of poetry collections and contain roughly half the original contents each.

== Contents ==
- "The Cross-Roads"
- "When I was King"
- "The Author's Farewell to the Bushmen"
- "From the Bush"
- "Heed Not"
- "The Bush Girl"
- "'G.S.,' or the Fourth Cook"
- "Jack Cornstalk"
- "The Men Who Made Australia"
- "The Bulletin Hotel"
- "Sacred to the Memory Of 'Unknown'"
- "The Shearers"
- "Knocking Around"
- "The Shearer's Dream"
- "The Never-Never Country"
- "With Dickens"
- "The Things We Dare Not Tell"
- "The Drums of Battersea"
- "As Far as Your Rifles Cover"
- "Gipsy Too"
- "The Wander-Light"
- "Genoa"
- "The Tracks That Lie by India"
- "Say Good-Bye When Your Chum is Married"
- "The Separation"
- "Ruth"
- "The Cliffs"
- "Bourke"
- "The Stringy-Bark Tree"
- "The Bush Fire"
- "The Bill of the Ages"
- "Waratah and Wattle"
- "My Land and I"
- "The Men Who Live It Down"
- "When Your Pants Begin to Go"
- "Robbie's Statue"
- "The Ballad of the Elder Son"
- "The Pride That Comes After"
- "A Voice from the City"
- "To-Morrow"
- "The Light on the Wreck"
- "The Secret Whisky Cure"
- "The Alleys"
- "The Scamps"
- "Break o' Day"
- "The Women of the Town"
- "The Afterglow"
- "Written Out"
- "New Life, New Love"
- "The King and Queen and I"
- "To Hannah"
- "The Water Lily"
- "Barta"
- "To Jim"
- "The Drunkard's Vision"
- "In the Storm That is to Come"
- "Australian Engineers"
- "The Drovers"
- "Those Foreign Engineers"
- "Skaal"
- "The Firing-Line"
- "Riding Round the Lines"
- "When the Bear Comes Back Again"
- "The Little Czar"
- "The Vanguard"
- "And the Bairns Will Come"
- "The Heart of Australia"
- "The Good Samaritan"
- "Will Yer Write It Down for Me?"
- "Andy's Return"
- "Pigeon Toes"
- "On the Wallaby"
- "The Brass Well"
- "Eureka"
- "The Last Review"
- "As Good as New"

== Critical reception ==
A reviewer in The Queenslander noted similarities between this book and a recent volume of poems by Louisa Lawson, the mother of Henry, although there was also something extra to be found in the current book: "Only a few weeks ago the poems of Henry Lawson's mother were noticed in these columns, and though in them there was more gentleness, better taste, more refinement than are found in the verses of the son, yet there is a similarity, if only in the very human tone pervading them and the strong Australian atmosphere. Henry Lawson has long since earned the right to be heard in both prose and verse; indeed, he is familiar to readers as are many of the verses in this new volume of his; but yet in one way we find a new Lawson, a man who has evidently upon him the spirit of repentance for something done, and a strong desire to make amends. So strong are these evidences, and so directly put, that it is impossible to dissociate them from a personal application."

A reviewer in The Age was not impressed: "It is to be feared that even the most ardent of Mr. Lawson's admirers will look upon this book of verse as a disappointment. It represents the results of his five years' work since he returned from England in 1900 — years that for various reasons must be considered the blackest of his life — and the unevenness of that work is almost painful to contemplate now that we have it in bulk. Only occasionally does he display any gleam — and then only a fleeting one — which bears any promise of better things in the future."

== Publication history ==
Following the original publication of this collection by Angus & Robertson in 1905, it was reprinted by the same publisher in 1906.

== See also ==
- 1905 in Australian literature
- 1905 in poetry
