= On the Edge of a Plain =

Short story by Henry Lawson

- Short story by Henry Lawson
- Country: Australia
- Language: English

Publication
- Published in: The Bulletin
- Media type: print (periodical)
- Publication date: 6 May 1893
- Series: Jack Mitchell stories

"On The Edge of a Plain" is a sketch story by Australian writer Henry Lawson, featuring his recurring character Jack Mitchell. The story was originally published in The Bulletin on 6 May 1893, and was collected in While the Billy Boils in 1896. It is considered among Lawson's best Mitchell stories.

== Plot summary ==
Mitchell and his mate drop their swags, and sit down in the mulga shade on the edge of a plain. Mitchell reflects about the last time he saw his family, after having been away for eight years. While he speaks, he holds a young cattle-pup, and occasionally intercuts his tale with observations about the pup's feet, or a request for a knife. With his story complete, Mitchell and his mate take up their swags, "[turn] their unshaven faces to the wide, hazy distance, and [leave] the timber behind them."

== Writing style ==
"On The Edge of a Plain" is an example of a sketch story, a style of short story of which Lawson was particularly fond. The story itself contains very little plot, and simply describes one particular moment in Mitchell's life.

== Reception ==
"On The Edge of the Plain" has been cited as the "perfect" example of an effective sketch story. Critic John Barnes believes that the story was ahead of its time, writing that "to a modern reader of Chekhov, the art of this little story is quickly recognised, but the originality of what Lawson was doing on his own went unremarked when While the Billy Boils was published in 1896."

== Publication Details ==
- First Published: Bulletin, 6 May 1893.
- Source: While The Billy Boils, Sydney, Angus and Robertson, 1896
