= A Double Buggy at Lahey's Creek =

- Short story by Henry Lawson
- Country: Australia

Publication
- Published in: Blackwood's Magazine
- Publication date: February 1901

Chronology
Brighton's Sister-in-law	Water Them Geraniums

"A Double Buggy at Lahey's Creek" is a short story by Australian writer and poet Henry Lawson, first published in 1901. It was Lawson's second story to include the character of Joe Wilson; however, chronologically, it is fourth and final in the Joe Wilson series. The story recounts the events that befall Joe Wilson and his family, and which ultimately lead to his buying a double buggy (Note: In this story, 'double buggy' refers to a vehicle with two seats that could seat four people.) for his wife, Mary.

== Plot summary ==
The story begins with Joe's earlier, unsuccessful attempts to acquire a double buggy, and how Mary's suggestion to grow potatoes becomes a profitable venture. Following a string of good luck, Joe decides to buy a double buggy for Mary, to show his appreciation for all the sacrifices she has made over the years of their marriage. The surprise gift strengthens what had been a somewhat unstable marriage.

== Publication ==
Lawson finished writing "A Double Buggy at Lahey's Creek" in August 1900. It was first published in Blackwood's Magazine in February 1901, and it was later included in the following:

- Joe Wilson and His Mates, 1901
- An Australian Story Book edited by Nettie Palmer, 1928
- Prose Passages edited by Alec King and Walter Murdoch, 1934
- Henry Lawson's Best Stories edited by Cecil Man, 1966
- The Bush Undertaker and Other Stories by Henry Lawson, edited by Colin Roderick, 1970
- Henry Lawson : Selected Stories edited by Brian Matthews, 1971
- The World of Henry Lawson edited by Walter W. Stone, 1974
- The Essential Henry Lawson : The Best Works of Australia's Greatest Writer edited by Brian Kiernan, 1982
- Prose Works of Henry Lawson, 1982
- A Camp-Fire Yarn : Henry Lawson Compete Works 1885-1900 edited by Leonard Cronin, 1984
- Henry Lawson Favourites, 1984
- The Penguin Henry Lawson : Short Stories edited by John Barnes, 1986
- Henry Lawson's Mates : The Complete Stories of Henry Lawson, 1987
- Classic Australian Short Stories edited by Maggie Pinkney, 2001
- Henry Lawson edited by Geoffrey Blainey, 2002

== Characters ==
- Joe Wilson
  - Narrator of the story. He is a typical Australian "battler," and experiences the ups and downs of late nineteenth century living. He cares greatly for his wife, though her opinion counts for little when it comes to making a living. He considers himself quite resourceful.
- Mary Wilson
  - Joe Wilson's wife. She is quite an intelligent woman, and likes to have her opinion heard, to the point that Joe considers her to be obstinate. She rarely complains about her dull, lonely lifestyle.
- Jim Wilson
  - The only child of Joe and Mary. His real name is John Henry Wilson, after an uncle godfather, but they'd called him Jim "from the first (and before it)." Though Jim plays a larger part in other Joe Wilson stories, particularly "Brighten's Sister-in-law," his role in this story is only marginal.
- James Black
  - Mary's "young scamp of a brother." He keeps Mary and the family company when Joe is on the road. He helps out around the property.
- Bill and Robert Galletly
  - Two brothers, the "biggest men in the district," who own a coach shop. They offer Joe a double buggy that he can pay off over time, whenever he can.
