= On the Track =

On the Track may refer to:

- On the Track (album), a 1975 album by Leon Redbone
- On the Track (short story collection), a 1900 collection of short stories by Henry Lawson
