= Bill, the Ventriloquial Rooster =

Short story by Henry Lawson

- Short story by Henry Lawson
- Genre: Sketch story

Publication
- Published in: Bulletin
- Publication date: 22 October 1898

"Bill, the Ventriloquial Rooster" is a sketch story by Australian writer Henry Lawson. The sketch is one of many to include Jack Mitchell the swagman as its main character and narrator. The story concerns a rooster that Mitchell's family once owned, named Bill, who was unknowingly ventriloquistic and always yearning to fight other roosters.

== Plot summary ==
The story begins with Mitchell reminiscing about the first time a cousin noticed that Bill the rooster was a ventriloquist. Not even Bill himself recognised his own peculiar skill, and he always "thought it was another rooster challenging him, and he wanted badly to find that other bird." When Mitchell's neighbour, an Irishman named Page, brings home a big white rooster, the two birds become involved in a vicious cock-fight. Though Bill emerges victorious, Page announces that it was "a grand foight" and bears no malice, yet he is then constantly on the lookout for a fighting-cock that may topple Bill.

Page borrows an experienced game-bird from town. Page and Mitchell's father agree on a fight, and Mitchell is forbidden to attend. Mitchell scales a tree and watches the fight unfold over a fence. Jim, the more experienced bird, runs Bill in circles for a whole hour until the large rooster can no longer move. Jim then gives Bill a "father of a hiding." Bill, his pride completely shattered after a defeat, is “so disgusted with himself that he [goes] under the cask and die[s].”

== Characters ==
- Jack Mitchell:
  - The narrator of the story. He speaks of this fond childhood memory as if he is telling the yarn to a companion.
- Bill, the rooster:
  - "A big mongrel of no particular breed, though the old lady said he was a ‘brammer.’" He is a ventriloquist, but doesn't realise it himself. He is a very proud rooster, and is always yearning for a fight.
- Jim, the game-cock:
  - The experienced game-bird that Page borrows from town, leaving five-pounds deposit on him, in the hope that he will beat Bill. Though "smaller and weaker" than Bill, Jim runs the larger, heavier bird is circles until he is no longer to move, at which point Jim strikes.
- Jack Mitchell's father:
  - Often referred to as Mitchell's 'Old Man.' Does not tell Mitchell about the fight, and gives him "the stepfather of a hiding" when he finds out that Mitchell was hiding up the tree.
- Page:
  - Mitchell's only neighbour, an Irishman. He and Mitchell's father had never been able to agree on anything. Doesn't mind when Bill defeats his own white rooster in a tussle, yet seeks out a fighting-bird that might defeat Bill.

== Quotes ==
- "Bill would stand on tiptoe, and hold his elbows out, and curve his neck, and go two or three times as if he was swallowing nest-eggs, and nearly break his neck and burst his gizzard; and then there’d be no sound at all where he was—only a cock crowing in the distance."
- "Sometimes he’d be out all day crowing and listening all over the country, and then come home dead tired, and rest and cool off in a hole that the hens had scratched for him in a damp place under the water-cask sledge."
- "But at last Bill couldn’t stand it any longer. He made up his mind to go and have it out, even if there was a whole agricultural show of prize and honourable-mention fighting-cocks in Page’s yard. He got down from the wood-heap and started off across the ploughed field, his head down, his elbows out, and his thick awkward legs prodding away at the furrows behind for all they were worth."
- "[Bill] held his head lower and lower and his wings further and further out from his sides, and prodded away harder and harder at the ground behind, but it wasn’t any use."
- "Bill was so disgusted with himself that he went under the cask and died."

== Publication Details ==
- First Published: Bulletin, 22 October 1898.
- Source: On The Track, Sydney, Angus and Robertson, 1900
