= Joe Wilson and His Mates =

Collection of short stories by Henry Lawson

- Title page for Joe Wilson and His Mates (1902 edition)
- Author: Henry Lawson
- Language: English
- Genre: Short story collection
- Publisher: William Blackwood
- Publication date: 1901
- Publication place: Australia
- Media type: Print (hardback & paperback)
- Pages: 334pp
- Preceded by: The Country I Come From
- Followed by: Children of the Bush

Joe Wilson and His Mates (1901) is a collection of short stories by Australian poet and author Henry Lawson. It was released in hardback by William Blackwood in 1901 when Lawson was living in England, and features one of the author's better known stories in "The Loaded Dog".

The collection contains twenty stories which are mostly reprinted from a variety of newspaper and magazine sources, with several published here for the first time.

== Contents ==
- "The Author's Farewell to the Bushmen"
- "Joe Wilson's Courtship"
- "Brighten's Sister-in-Law"
- "Water Them Geraniums"
- "A Double Buggy at Lahey's Creek"
- "The Golden Graveyard"
- "The Chinaman's Ghost"
- "The Loaded Dog"
- "Poisonous Jimmy Gets Left"
- "The Ghostly Door"
- "A Wild Irishman"
- "The Babies in the Bush"
- "A Bush Dance"
- "The Buck-Jumper"
- "Jimmy Grimshaw's Wooing"
- "At Dead Dingo"
- "Telling Mrs Baker"
- "A Hero in Dingo-Scrubs"
- "The Little World Left Behind"
- "The Never-Never Country"

== Critical reception ==
A reviewer in The Chronicle (Adelaide) noted that the collection is good in parts. "Joe Wilson and His Mates will bear a good deal of winnowing. On the other hand, when Mr. Lawson gets hold of a strong incident, as in "The Babies in the Bush", the power of imagination tells, and the reader is affected by the author's own feeling. It is an old truism that a writer who feels what he says will always arouse in some degree a corresponding feeling in others, and Mr. Lawson (being a poet) is a writer in whose work the emotional touch is rarely wanting when it is needed."

In The Record (Emerald Hill) the reviewer was impressed with Lawson's characters: "Lawson's men are men of flesh and blood; his landscapes, skies, atmosphere, are vivid and real; his broad humour is racy of the soil. He has brought a strong, unconventional mind, and a gift of intense expression to a set of new conditions and an unknown land. And, for us, it is our own land. In the softening of harsh tints too we detect Lawson looking back through the golden after-glow of memory and thinking lovingly of the homeland. He has sublime confidence in the Australian bushman."

== See also ==
- Full text of the volume is available at Project Gutenberg Australia
- 1901 in Australian literature
- Joe Wilson (character)

== Notes ==
This collection was later published in two volumes in 1904: Joe Wilson containing the first part of the original collection, and Joe Wilson's Mates the second.
