= Favourite Australian Stories =

1963 short story anthology edited by Colin Thiele

- Author: edited by Colin Thiele
- Language: English
- Genre: Short story anthology
- Publisher: Rigby
- Publication date: 1963
- Publication place: Australia
- Media type: Print
- Pages: 194 pp.

Favourite Australian Stories is an anthology of Australian short stories edited by Colin Thiele, published by Rigby in 1963.

The anthology contains 23 stories which were published in a variety of original publications, from a range of authors.

== Contents ==
- "The Drover's Wife", Henry Lawson
- "The Loaded Dog", Henry Lawson
- "The Perch", Dal Stivens
- "Fishing for Eels", Alan Marshall
- "Clarkey's Dead", Alan Marshall
- "A Golden Shanty", Edward Dyson
- "The Funerals of Malachi Mooney", Edward Dyson
- "The Foal", Vance Palmer
- "The Ant-Lion", Judith Wright
- "Tell Us About the Turkey, Jo", Alan Marshall
- "The Pelican", Cecil Mann
- "The Night We Watched for Wallabies", Steele Rudd
- "It Finds Its Level", Gavin Casey
- "'Twenty Strong'", Margaret Trist
- "The School Bus Driver", E. O. Schlunke
- "Quite a Blow", Standby (R. S. Porteous)
- "Kaijek the Songman", Xavier Herbert
- "The Grown-Up Ball" ('And Women Must Weep'), Henry Handel Richardson
- "The Good Herdsman", Frank Dalby Davison
- "Country Town", Hal Porter

== Critical reception ==
Writing in the Tribune (Sydney) reviewer J. M. noted: "Colin Thiele has done a service by including in the collection stories by Steele Rudd, Henry Handel Richardson and Xavier Herbert which otherwise might not be known...One of the interesting features of this collection is the preponderance of stories from the countryside — stories which give city dwellers a better understanding of the lives of country people."

== See also ==
- 1963 in Australian literature
