= The Never-Never Country =

Poem by Australian writer Henry Lawson

- by Henry Lawson
- Written: 1901
- First published in: Joe Wilson and His Mates
- Country: Australia
- Language: English
- Preceded by: "The Ballad of the Black Sheep"
- Followed by: "Knocking Around"

Full text
- The Never-Never Country at Wikisource

"The Never-Never Country" (1901) is a poem by Australian poet Henry Lawson. It is also known by the title "The Never-Never Land".

It was originally published in the writer's collection Joe Wilson and His Mates and subsequently reprinted in several of the author's other collections and a number of Australian poetry anthologies.

== Critical reception ==
Reviewing Joe Wilson and His Mates in The Sydney Morning Herald a writer noted "It has been said that Mr Lawson's knowledge of the Australian bush was at the best but second-hand, but this criticism has not been made or endorsed by bushmen in a literary sense, he "owed" them. His buses ran like wildfire from shearer's hut to shearer's hut They expressed to a certain extent and within certain limitations the feelings, hopes, and thoughts of the average bushmen. If they were not literature they were at least human document Sometimes they were both."

Binod Mishra, in examining Henry Lawson's poetry for The Atlantic Literary Review stated that "The poem...is a remarkable example of his patriotic feeling which grows jingoistic at times. The poet's home rests in his coveted country which has a long history of struggle. The chequered history of Australia comprises the indigenous people facing the threat to their existence by none other than the aliens who in the name of enriching the land depleted it by means fair or foul. One can find the poet admonishing the English people who made the real natives suffer."

== Publication history ==
After the poem's initial publication in Joe Wilson and His Mates it was reprinted as follows:

- When I Was King and Other Verses by Henry Lawson, Angus and Robertson, 1905
- Selected Poems of Henry Lawson by Henry Lawson, Angus and Robertson, 1918
- Favourite Australian Poems edited by Ian Mudie, Rigby, 1963
- A Fantasy of Man : Henry Lawson Complete Works 1901-1922 edited by Leonard Cronin, Lansdowne, 1984
- The Illustrated Treasury of Australian Verse edited by Beatrice Davis, Nelson, 1984
- Classic Australian Verse edited by Maggie Pinkney, Five Mile Press, 2001

== See also ==
- 1901 in Australian literature
- 1901 in poetry
