= Brummie =

Brummie is the colloquial demonym of Birmingham, England.

Brummie may refer to:

- Brummie dialect of English
- Birmingham Brummies, a motorcycle speedway team
- John Stokes (mountaineer) (1945–2016), British climber and soldier

== See also ==
- Brummy Hewson, fictional character
- Brum (disambiguation)
- Birmingham, England
- List of people from Birmingham
- Birmingham (disambiguation)
