= The Antipodean =

Australian magazine

- Editor: George Essex Evans
- Frequency: Annual
- Publisher: George Robertson & Co..
- Founded: 1892
- Country: Australia
- Language: English

The Antipodean was an annual Australian illustrated literary periodical first published in 1892. It was edited by George Essex Evans in 1892, 1893 and 1897, with co-editors John Tighe Ryan (1892–3) and Banjo Paterson (1897). The publisher was George Robertson & Co.

In its early years, the periodical published works such as:

- The Bush Undertaker (1892), by Henry Lawson
- The Geebung Polo Club (1893), by Banjo Paterson
- My Gulf Helmet, by George Essex Evans under the pseudonym "Christophus"
- A Daughter of Maoriland, by Henry Lawson
