= While the Billy Boils (short story collection) =

1896 short story collection by Henry Lawson

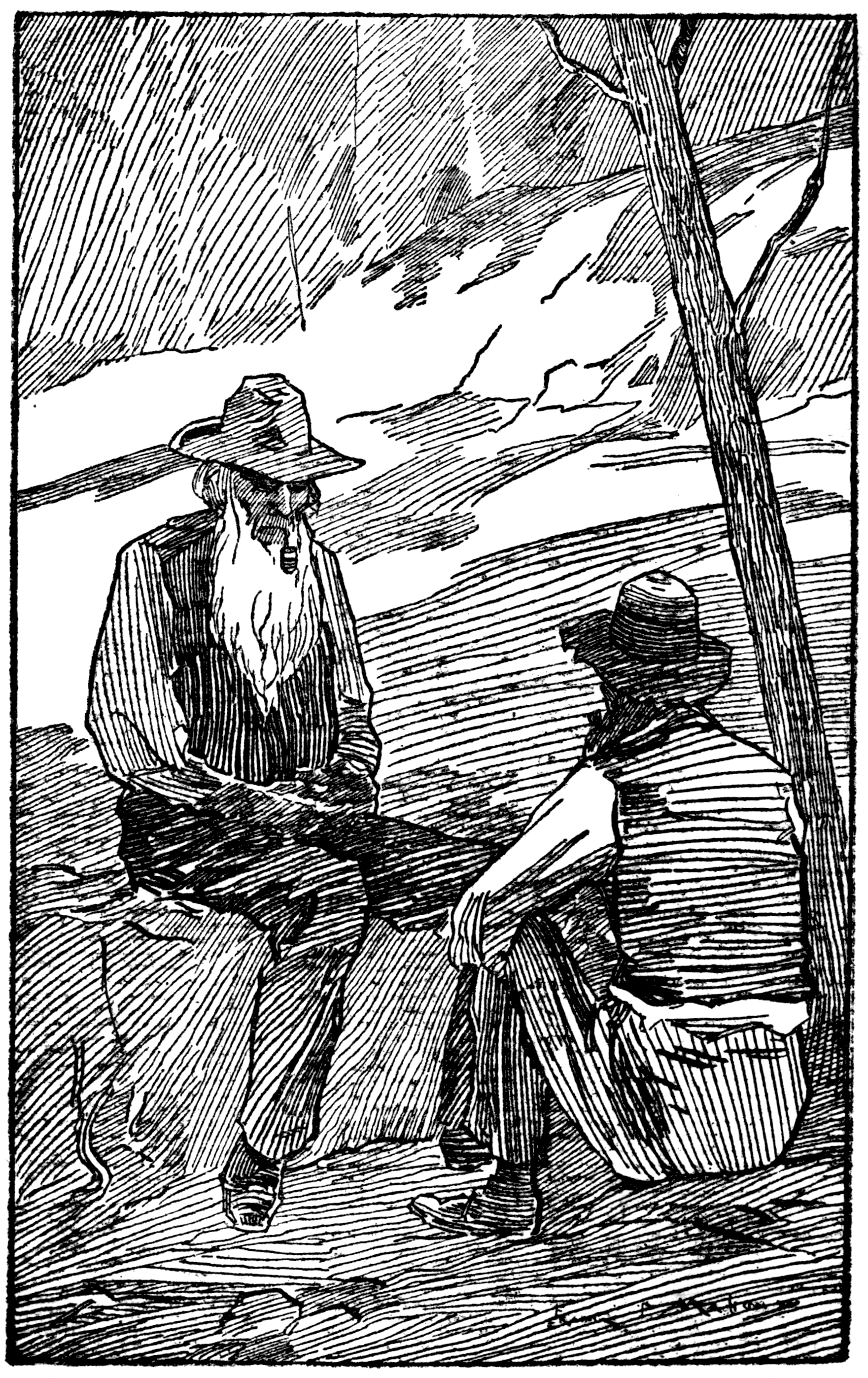
- "They would talk of some old lead" Frontispiece from the collection, by Frank P. Mahony
- Author: Henry Lawson
- Language: English
- Genre: Short story collection
- Publisher: Angus and Robertson
- Publication date: 1896
- Publication place: Australia
- Media type: Print
- Pages: 333 pp
- Preceded by: Short Stories in Prose and Verse
- Followed by: In the Days When the World was Wide and Other Verses

While the Billy Boils is a collection of short stories by the Australian writer Henry Lawson, published by Angus and Robertson in 1896. It includes "The Drover's Wife", "On the Edge of a Plain", and "The Union Buries Its Dead".

The collection consists of 52 short stories from a variety of sources.

== Contents ==
- "An Old Mate of Your Father's"
- "Settling on the Land"
- "Enter Mitchell"
- "Stiffner and Jim (Thirdly, Bill)"
- "When the Sun Went Down"
- "The Man Who Forgot"
- "Hungerford"
- "A Camp-Fire Yarn"
- "His Country - After All"
- "A Day on a Selection"
- "That There Dog O' Mine"
- "Going Blind"
- "Arvie Aspinall's Alarm Clock"
- "Stragglers"
- "The Union Buries Its Dead"
- "On the Edge of a Plain"
- "In a Dry Season"
- "He'd Come Back"
- "Another of Mitchell's Plans for the Future"
- "Steelman"
- "Drifted Back"
- "Remailed"
- "The Drover's Wife"
- "Mitchell Doesn't Believe in the Sack"
- "Shooting the Moon"
- "His Father's Mate"
- "An Echo from the Old Bark School"
- "The Shearing of the Cook's Dog"
- "'Dossing Out' and 'Camping'"
- "Across the Straits"
- "Steelman's Pupil"
- "An Unfinished Love Story"
- "Board and Residence"
- "His Colonial Oath"
- "Some Day"
- "A Visit of Condolence"
- "In a Wet Season"
- "Rats"
- "Mitchell : A Character Sketch"
- "The Bush Undertaker"
- "Our Pipes"
- "Coming Across : A Study in the Steerage"
- "The Story of Malachi"
- "Two Dogs and a Fence"
- "Jones's Alley"
- "Brummy Usen"
- "Bogg of Geebung"
- "She Wouldn't Speak"
- "The Geological Spieler"
- "Macquarie's Mate"
- "Baldy Thompson"
- "For Auld Lang Syne"

== Critical reception ==
A reviewer in The Queenslander found much to like about the book but also noted its limitations: "..most of the sketches can best be described as Bulletinesque, the evidence of their having been written with a view to appearance in that popular weekly being unmistakable. There is plenty of variety in the book; fun and pathos, and the two commingled, with running through nearly all a note of cynicism - not altogether spontaneous in the author, but rather inspired by his associations — which one has come to expect in the writings of Henry Lawson."

Similarly the reviewer in The Australian Town and Country Journal: "They are just such anecdotes and snap-shots of general conversation which would be in keeping with the time for rest and jest around camp-fires, and of course the author picked up his materials under such circumstances. They can scarcely all be denominated "stories" - inasmuch as many of them are merely impressions of men and things, and are no more tales than the descriptive writing of a journalist. These impressions give anything but a cheerful view of Australian life up country, The stranger who knows not Australia will doubtless apply Mr. Lawson's description to the whole country outside the towns, but the stories do not deal with the country as a whole, but with that part of it referred to as "out back.""

== Film adaptation ==
Several of the stories in this collections were adapted for the screen in a 1921 film. It was written, directed and produced by Beaumont Smith. It is considered a lost film.

== See also ==
- 1896 in Australian literature

== Notes ==
The State Library of New South Wales holds the correction drafts of this title. They are available online.
