= The Loaded Dog =

1901 Australian comedy short story by Henry Lawson

- Short story by Henry Lawson
- Country: Australia
- Language: English
- Genre: Comedy

Publication
- Published in: Joe Wilson and His Mates
- Publisher: Blackwood
- Media type: print (short story collection)
- Publication date: 1901

"The Loaded Dog" is a comedy short story by the Australian writer Henry Lawson. The plot concerns three gold miners and their dog, and the farcical consequences of leaving a bomb cartridge unattended. The story was first published in the collection Joe Wilson and His Mates in 1901.

== Plot summary ==
Three gold miners named Dave Regan, Jim Bently, and Andy Page are sinking a shaft at Stony Creek. The trio own a young retriever dog named Tommy, described as "an overgrown pup... a big foolish, four-footed mate." Andy and Dave, fishing enthusiasts, devise a unique method of catching fish using explosives. The dog picks up an explosive cartridge in its mouth, and runs the fuse through the campfire, prompting the three men to flee. Tommy, thinking it a game, playfully chases down his "two-legged mates," who try everything in their power to escape the cartridge. Jim tries to climb a tree and then drops down a mine shaft, meanwhile Andy has hidden behind a log. When Dave seeks refuge in the local pub, the dog bounds in after him, causing the Bushmen (people who live in the bush) inside to scatter. Tommy comes across a "vicious yellow mongrel cattle-dog sulking and nursing his nastiness under [the kitchen]," who takes the cartridge for himself. A crowd of dogs, curious about this unusual object, gather around the cartridge. The subsequent explosion blows apart the yellow cattle-dog and maims numerous others. For half an hour, the Bushmen who witnessed the spectacle are laughing hysterically. Tommy the retriever trots home after Dave, "smiling his broadest, longest, and reddest smile of amiability, and apparently satisfied for one afternoon with the fun he’d had.".

== Characters ==
- Tommy the retriever: A black, overgrown pup "who was always slobbering... Most of his head was usually a red, idiotic, slobbering grin of appreciation of his own silliness. He seemed to take life, the world, his two-legged mates, and his own instinct as a huge joke."
- Dave Regan: A laid-back gold miner, who is fond of fishing. It is Dave's idea to use a cartridge to catch fish.
- Andy Page: A fellow gold miner, who "usually put Dave’s theories into practice if they were practicable, or bore the blame for the failure and the chaffing of his mates if they weren’t."
- Jim Bently: Described as being uninterested in the "damned silliness" of Dave and Andy's scheme. He enjoys eating fish, but has no interest in fishing.

== Publication ==
"The Loaded Dog" first appeared in the collection Joe Wilson and His Mates, published by Blackwood in 1901. The following year, this collection was published in Australia by Angus and Robertson.

The story was then published as follows:

- Australian Short Stories edited by George Mackaness, 1928
- The Children's Lawson edited by Colin Roderick, Angus and Robertson, 1949
- A Century of Australian Short Stories edited by Cecil Hadgraft and R.B.J. Wilson, 1963
- Favourite Australian Stories edited by Colin Thiele, Rigby, 1963
- Southern Harvest : An Anthology of Australian Short Stories edited by R. F. Brissenden
- Henry Lawson's Humorous Stories edited by Cecil Mann, Angus & Robertson, 1967
- The World of Henry Lawson edited by Walter Stone, Hamlyn, 1974
- The Essential Henry Lawson : The Best Works of Australia's Greatest Writer edited Brian Kiernan, Currey O'Neil, 1982
- Prose Works of Henry Lawson by Henry Lawson, Angus & Robertson, 1982
- A Campfire Yarn : Henry Lawson Complete Works 1885-1900 edited by Leonard Cronin, Lansdowne, 1984
- Henry Lawson Favourites, Currey O’Neill, 1984
- My Country : Australian Poetry and Short Stories, Two Hundred Years edited by Leonie Kramer, Lansdowne, 1985
- Henry Lawson : An Illustrated Treasury edited by Glenys Smith, Lansdowne, 1985
- Henry Lawson's Mates: The Complete Stories of Henry Lawson, Viking, 1987
- The Illustrated Treasury of Australian Humour edited by Michael Sharkey
- The Penguin Century of Australian Stories edited by Carmel Bird, Penguin, 2000

Along with many publications in various periodicals and newspapers.

== Reception ==
"The Loaded Dog" is one of Henry Lawson's most popular works. John Barnes cites the story as being illustrative of Lawson's talent for humorous writing, calling it a "hilarious farce." Barnes further remarks that, despite focusing on the actions of the dog, "Lawson raises the story above the level of stock farce by making what happens the result of Dave Regan's bright idea."

== See also ==
- Dog Barbos and Unusual Cross
- 1901 in Australian literature
