= Saint Peter (poem) =

1893 poem by Australian writer Henry Lawson

- by Henry Lawson
- Written: 1893
- First published in: The Bulletin
- Country: Australia
- Language: English
- Publication date: 8 April 1893

Full text
- Saint Peter at Wikisource

"Saint Peter" is a well-known poem by iconic Australian writer and poet Henry Lawson. It was first published on 8 April 1893 in The Bulletin.

The poem references Saint Peter. It was written to music in 1975 by Australian musician Peter Duggan and is now a popular Australian folk song.

== Further publications ==
- Verses, Popular and Humorous (1900)
- Humorous Verses by Henry Lawson, Angus and Robertson (1941)
- Songs from Lawson edited by John Meredith, Bush Music Club (1957)
- The World of Henry Lawson edited by Walter Stone, Hamlyn (1974)
- A Campfire Yarn : Henry Lawson Complete Works 1885-1900 edited by Leonard Cronin, Lansdowne (1984)

== See also ==
- 1893 in Australian literature
- 1893 in poetry
