= The Bush Undertaker =

Short story by Henry Lawson

- Short story by Henry Lawson
- Country: Australia
- Language: English
- Genre: Humour

Publication
- Published in: The Antipodean
- Publication type: Periodical
- Media type: Print
- Publication date: 1892

"The Bush Undertaker" is a short story by Australian writer and poet Henry Lawson. Along with "The Drover's Wife", "The Bush Undertaker" is one of Lawson's first sketches, and is among the stories for which he first gained attention as an accomplished writer. The story concerns an eccentric old man, who lives alone with only his dog for company, and his discovery and treatment of a friend's deceased body.

== Plot summary ==
The sketch begins with old man preparing dinner for himself and his beloved dog, Five Bob. Dinner consumed, the man gathers a pick and shovel and travels to a "blackfellow's grave about which he was curious." He digs up the bones, places them in a bag, and starts for home. He discovers the body of a man, parched by the intense Australian sun. After close examination, the deceased man is determined to be a friend of the old man, an alcoholic named Brummy. The old man, somewhat ingeniously, devises a way of carrying Brummy back home, but he is startled by numerous large, greasy black goannas. He wonders why the peculiar lizards are so abundant today. He only discovers later, when he shoots one near the house, that they are attracted to Brummy's body. When the old man returns to his home, he decides that Brummy deserves a respectful funeral. He buries his friend, and decides that something must be said. He is unsure of Brummy's religion, or if he even has a religion at all, but the old man does his best. Presently, he rises, takes up his tools, and walks back to his hut as the sun sinks on the "grand Australian bush."

== Characters ==
- The Bush Undertaker: An old shepherd who lives alone; his only companionship comes from his beloved dog, Five-Bob. He is considerably eccentric, and often speaks to himself. He is respectful of his dead friend, though this obviously does not extend to many others, as he often exhumes the graves of "blackfellows" out of sheer curiosity.
- Brummy: An alcoholic, whose body is discovered about three months after his death. The body itself has been preserved by an excess consumption of rum, and "dried to a mummy by the intense heat of the western summer." When alive, Brummy had been a good worker, yet had wasted his money on alcohol.

== Quotes ==
- "In due time the dinner was dished up; and the old man seated himself on a block, with the lid of a gin-case across his knees for a table. Five Bob squatted opposite with the liveliest interest and appreciation depicted on his intelligent countenance..."
- "Dinner proceeded very quietly, except when the carver paused to ask the dog how some tasty morsel went with him, and Five Bob’s tail declared that it went very well indeed."
- "When he had raked up all the bones, he amused himself by putting them together on the grass and by speculating as to whether they had belonged to black or white, male or female."
- "On reaching the hut the old man dumped the corpse against the wall, wrong end up, and stood scratching his head while he endeavoured to collect his muddled thoughts..."
- "'Brummy,' he said at last. 'It’s all over now; nothin’ matters now—nothin’ didn’t ever matter, nor—nor don’t.'"
- "And the sun sank again on the grand Australian bush—the nurse and tutor of eccentric minds, the home of the weird, and of much that is different from things in other lands."

== Publication Details ==
- First Published: The Antipodean, 1892, under the title "Christmas in the Far West" or "The Bush Undertaker."
- Source: The Country I Come From, Edinburgh and London, Blackwood's Magazine, 1901
