= Brum =

Brum may refer to:

- Birmingham, England
  - Brummagem, its historic local name (etym of Brum)
  - Brummie dialect
  - University of Birmingham
  - Birmingham City F.C., in association football
- Brum (TV series)
- Brum (surname), a Portuguese name

== See also ==
- Brummie (disambiguation)
