= The Drover's Wife (Drysdale) =

1945 painting by Russell Drysdale

- Artist: Russell Drysdale
- Year: 1945
- Medium: oil on canvas
- Dimensions: 51.5 cm × 61.5 cm (20.3 in × 24.2 in)
- Location: National Gallery of Australia, Canberra

The Drover's Wife is an oil painting on canvas executed in 1945 by Australian artist Russell Drysdale. It depicts a flat, barren landscape with a woman in a plain dress in the foreground. The drover with his horses and wagon are in the background. The painting has been described as "an allegory of the white Australian people's relationship with this ancient land." Henry Lawson's 1892 short story "The Drover's Wife" is widely seen as an inspiration for the painting, although Drysdale denied that.

The painting is now part of the collection of the National Gallery of Australia in Canberra.
