= The Funerals of Malachi Mooney =

Short story by Edward Dyson

- Short story by Edward Dyson
- Country: Australia
- Language: English
- Genre: Humour

Publication
- Published in: The Bulletin
- Media type: print (magazine)
- Publication date: 24 February 1900

"The Funerals of Malachi Mooney" is a humorous short story by the Australian writer Edward Dyson.

The story was first published in the 24 February 1900 edition of The Bulletin magazine, and was subsequently reprinted in a number of Australian short story anthologies.

== Plot ==
The story tells of the death of Malachi Mooney, the subsequent uproarious wake, and the trip from the town of Bungaree into East Ballarat where the cemetery is located. But in the confusion and affected by drink the mourners have left the corpse still lying in the bed where he died.

== Publications ==
"The Funerals of Malachi Mooney" first appeared in The Bulletin magazine on 24 February 1900. It was subsequently published as follows:

- The Bulletin Story Book : A Selection of Stories and Literary Sketches from 'The Bulletin' [1881–1901] edited by Alfred George Stephens (1901)
- Australian Short Stories edited by Henrietta Drake-Brockman and Walter Murdoch (1951)
- Favourite Australian Stories edited by Colin Thiele (1963)
- The Old Bulletin Reader : The Best Stories from The Bulletin 1881–1901 (1973)
- My Country : Australian Poetry and Short Stories, Two Hundred Years edited by Leonie Kramer (1985)

It was also translated into German in 1961.

== Critical reception ==
Reviewing The Bulletin Story Book in The Australasian a reviewer noted: "A few of the stories are marked by a decided vein of humour, though even that is frequently grim and cynical. Among them may be mentioned..."The Funerals of Malachi Mooney" by Edward Dyson."

== See also ==
- 1900 in Australian literature
