= When Your Pants Begin to Go =

Poem by Henry Lawson

- by Henry Lawson
- First published in: The Bulletin, 17 December 1892
- Country: Australia
- Language: English
- Publication date: 1892
- Lines: 48

Full text
- When Your Pants Begin to Go at Wikisource

"When Your Pants Begin to Go" is a poem by Australian poet Henry Lawson. It was first published in The Bulletin on 17 December 1892, and later in the poet's collections and other Australian poetry anthologies.

== Outline ==
The poem puts the point that, no matter how low you may feel, how bad your circumstances may be, the most important thing that should be on your mind is the state of your trousers.

== Analysis ==
In an overview of Lawson's work in the Free Lance (Melbourne) in 1896 a writer noted that "Lawson is a sundowner of inveterate type, and although everything he writes is prompted by genuine inspiration, none of his pieces is more solidly inspired than 'When your pants begin to go.' That is the production of a man who has been there, and been there often."

Again in 1896, a critic in The Weekly Times commented, when discussing this poem, that Lawson "observes much – almost too much of some things. The centre of his observation, so far as men are concerned, is their trousers."

== Further publications ==
- When I Was King and Other Verses by Henry Lawson, 1905
- Selected Poems of Henry Lawson by Henry Lawson, Angus and Robertson, 1918
- The Bulletin, 29 January 1930
- Australian Poets Speak edited by Colin Thiele and Ian Mudie, Rigby, 1961
- Favourite Australian Poems edited by Ian Mudie, Rigby, 1963
- The Bulletin, 30 December 1980
- A Campfire Yarn : Henry Lawson Complete Works 1885-1900 edited by Leonard Cronin, Lansdowne, 1984
- The Illustrated Treasury of Australian Verse edited by Beatrice Davis, Nelson, 1984
- The New Oxford Book of Australian Verse edited by Les Murray, Oxford University Press, 1996
- An Australian Treasury of Popular Verse edited by Jim Haynes, ABC Books, 2002
- Two Centuries of Australian Poetry edited by Kathrine Bell, Gary Allen, 2007
- 100 Australian Poems You Need to Know edited by Jamie Grant, Hardie Grant, 2008

== See also ==
- 1892 in poetry
- 1892 in Australian literature
- Australian literature
