= The Drover's Wife (short story) =

Short story by Henry Lawson

- Short story by Henry Lawson
- Country: Australia
- Language: English
- Genre: Drama

Publication
- Published in: The Bulletin
- Media type: print (magazine)
- Publication date: 23 July 1892

"The Drover's Wife" is a dramatic short story by the Australian writer Henry Lawson. It recounts the story of a woman left alone with her four children in an isolated hut in the outback in the late 19th century.

The story was first published in the 23 July 1892 edition of The Bulletin magazine, and was subsequently reprinted in a number of the author's collections as well as other anthologies.

== Plot ==
A woman in the outback is isolated in a small hut with her four children. Her husband has been away droving for six months; near sunset one day, a snake disappears under the house. After putting her children to bed, the woman waits with her dog, Alligator, for the snake to re-appear. When the snake emerges near dawn, it is quickly killed by the woman and Alligator; the story shows the struggle of a lone woman against nature.

== Publications ==
"The Drover's Wife" first appeared in The Bulletin magazine on 23 July 1892. It was subsequently published in Short Stories in Prose and Verse, Lawson's 1894 collection of short stories and poetry. Since its initial publication it has become one of Henry Lawson's most re-published works.

- Short Stories in Prose and Verse by Henry Lawson (1894)
- While the Billy Boils by Henry Lawson (1896)
- The Bulletin Story Book : A Selection of Stories and Literary Sketches from 'The Bulletin' [1881–1901] edited by Alfred George Stephens (1901)
- Australian Short Stories edited by George Mackaness (1928)
- The Children's Lawson edited by Colin Roderick (1949)
- The Bulletin, 1 February 1950
- Hemisphere vol. 1 no. 2, (1957)
- Favourite Australian Stories edited by Colin Thiele (1963)
- A Century of Australian Short Stories edited by Cecil Hadgraft and R. B. J. Wilson (1963)
- Short Stories of Australia : The Lawson Tradition edited by Douglas Stewart (1967)
- While the Billy Boils : 87 Stories from the Prose Works of Henry Lawson by Henry Lawson (1970)
- The Bush Undertaker and Other Stories edited by Colin Roderick (1970)
- Henry Lawson : Selected Stories edited by Brian Matthews (1971)
- Best Australian Short Stories edited by Douglas Stewart and Beatrice Davis (1971)
- Henry Lawson's Best Stories by Henry Lawson (1973)
- The Old Bulletin Reader : The Best Stories from The Bulletin 1881–1901 (1973)
- An Australian Selection : Short Stories By Lawson, Palmer, Porter, White and Cowan edited by John Barnes (1974)
- The World of Henry Lawson edited by Walter Stone (1974)
- The Bulletin, 29 January 1980
- Short Stories by Henry Lawson (1981)
- Prose Works of Henry Lawson by Henry Lawson (1982)
- The Essential Henry Lawson : The Best Works of Australia's Greatest Writer edited by Brian Kiernan (1982)
- A Camp-Fire Yarn : Henry Lawson Complete Works 1885–1900 edited by Leonard Cronin (1984)
- Henry Lawson Favourites by Henry Lawson (1984)
- My Country : Australian Poetry and Short Stories, Two Hundred Years edited by Leonie Kramer (1985)
- Henry Lawson : An Illustrated Treasury by Henry Lawson (1985)
- The Penguin Henry Lawson : Short Stories edited by John Barnes (1986)
- Henry Lawson's Mates : The Complete Stories of Henry Lawson by Henry Lawson (1987)
- Australian Short Stories edited by Carmel Bird (1991)
- The Penguin Book of 19th Century Australian Literature edited by Michael Ackland (1993)
- An Anthology of Australian Literature edited by Ch'oe Chin-yong and Cynthia Van Den Driesen (1995)
- The Arnold Anthology of Post-Colonial Literatures in English edited by John Thieme (1996)
- 200 Years of Australian Writing : An Anthology edited by James F. H. Moore (1997)
- Classic Australian Short Stories edited by Maggie Pinkney (2001)
- Henry Lawson edited by Geoffrey Blainey (2002)
- The Campfire Yarns of Henry Lawson by Henry Lawson (2009)
- Macquarie PEN Anthology of Australian Literature edited by Nicholas Jose, Kerryn Goldsworthy, Anita Heiss, David McCooey, Peter Minter, Nicole Moore and Elizabeth Webby (2009)

== Cultural references ==
- The Drover's Wife is a 1945 painting by Australian artist Russell Drysdale. While the painting does not specifically illustrate a scene from the story, it takes its title from it.
- Murray Bail's story, "The Drover's Wife" (1975), is based on Drysdale's painting and is narrated by the woman's first husband.
- Frank Moorhouse's story, "The Drover's Wife" (1980), satirises the bush ethos of Lawson and academics who study him.
- Barbara Jefferis's story, "The Drover's Wife" (1980), provides a feminist viewpoint of the story.
- Damien Broderick's story, "The Drover's Wife's Dog" (1991), narrates the story from the point of view of the dog.
- Ryan O'Neill's 2018 collection of stories, The Drover's Wives: 99 Reinterpretations of Henry Lawson's Australian Classic, remixes and revises Lawson's story in 99 different ways.

== On screen and stage ==
In 1968, the Australian Broadcasting Commission created a 45-minute adaptation of the story, directed by Giancarlo Manara and featuring Clarissa Kaye in the lead role.

In 2016 the story was adapted into a play by Leah Purcell. It premiered at the Belvoir Theatre in September 2016, and was directed by Leticia Cáceres. Purcell's film version, entitled The Drover's Wife: The Legend of Molly Johnson, premiered at the South by Southwest film festival on 18 March 2021 and was released in Australia and the UK in May 2022. Purcell's play was adapted into an opera with music by George Palmer, part of the 2026 opening program of the Queensland Performing Arts Centre's Glasshouse Theatre, with Nina Korbe in the title role and Tahu Matheson conducting.
