= Brummy Hewson =

Poem fictional character

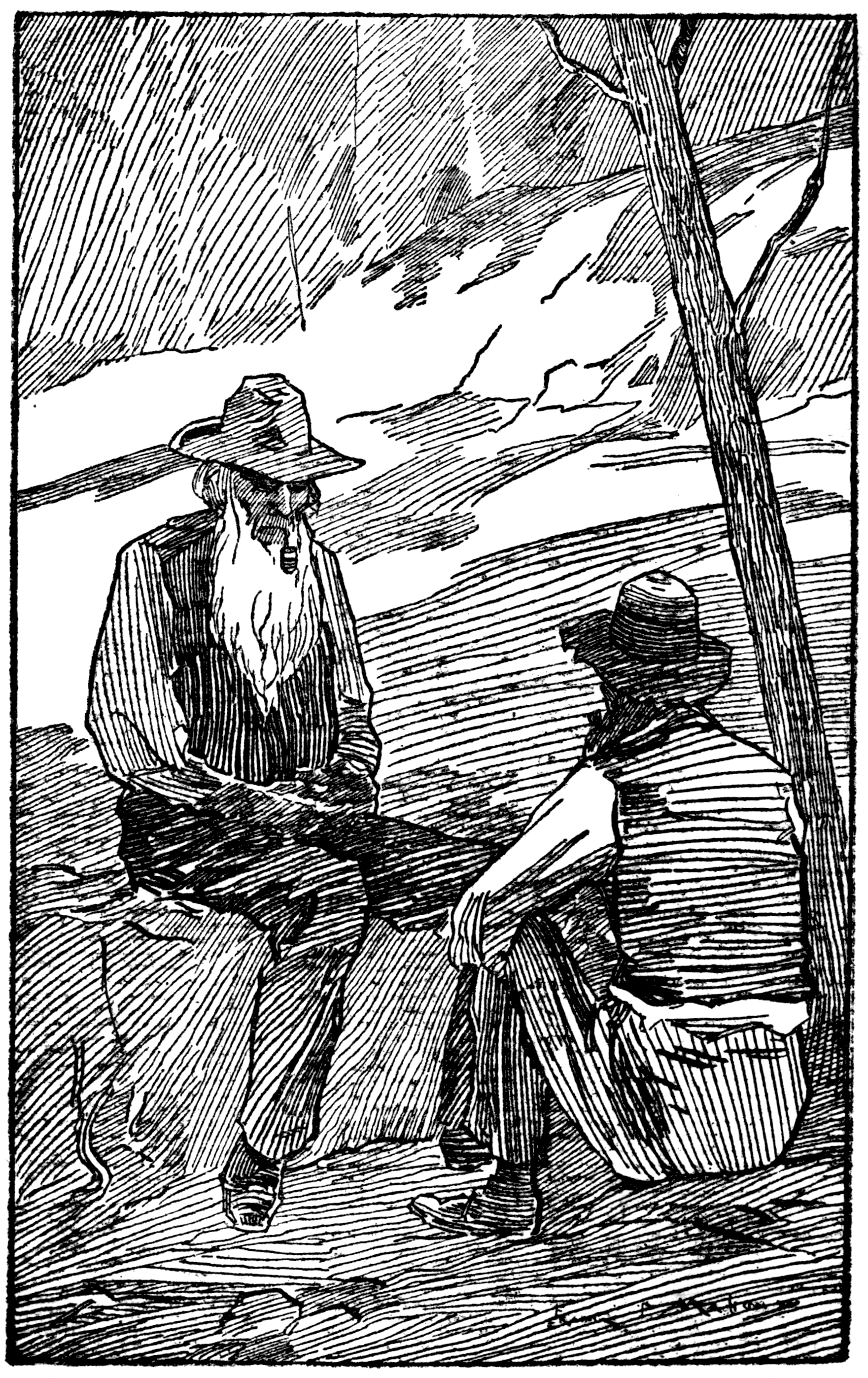
While the Billy Boils, 1913 - frontispiece.

Brummy Hewson also known as Brummy Hughson or Brummy Usen is a recurring fictional character in the works of writer and bush poet, Australia's Henry Lawson.

Brummy is described as a swagman or bush traveller. In the story Bush Undertaker he is described as a good worker, yet had wasted his money on alcohol, although much about his identity is wrapped by Lawson in myth and subterfuge. Elsewhere he is called a bushranger. Indeed, in the book While the Billy Boils a tale of Brummy is recounted by a nameless swagman, when the reader is left with the feeling that the nameless swagman telling his tale may actually be the supposedly deceased Hewson.

Brummy Hewson may have been based on John "Brummy" Hewson, a claims minder and dubious "horse trader" active in the Mudgee Area while Lawson was growing up.

The character Brummy is mentioned in:

- While the Billy Boils, by Henry Lawson
- The Bush Undertaker
- He Had so Much Work to Do
