= Over the Sliprails =

Collected short stories by Henry Lawson

- 1922 edition
- Author: Henry Lawson
- Cover artist: Terry Lindsay
- Language: English
- Genre: Short story collection
- Publisher: Angus and Robertson
- Publication date: 1900
- Publication place: Australia
- Media type: Print (hardback & paperback)
- Pages: 167pp
- Preceded by: On the Track
- Followed by: On the Track, and Over the Sliprails

Over the Sliprails (1900) is a collection of short stories by Australian poet and author Henry Lawson. It was released in hardback by Angus and Robertson in 1900, and features some of the author's lesser known stories.

The collection contains sixteen stories which are mostly reprinted from a variety of newspaper sources, with several published here for the first time. The story "The Hero of Redclay" was originally intended to be a novel but was shortened by the author and published here as a short story.

== Contents ==
- "The Shanty-Keeper's Wife"
- "A Gentleman Sharper and Steelman Sharper"
- "An Incident at Stiffner's"
- "The Hero of Redclay"
- "The Darling River"
- "A Case for the Oracle"
- "A Daughter of Maoriland : A Sketch of Poor-Class Maoris"
- "New Year's Night"
- "Black Joe"
- "They Wait on the Wharf in Black : Told by Mitchell's Mate"
- "Seeing the Last of You"
- "Two Boys at Grinder Bros"
- "The Selector's Daughter"
- "Mitchell on the `Sex' and Other `Problems'"
- "The Master's Mistake"
- "The Story of the Oracle"

== Critical reception ==
A reviewer in The Worker (Wagga), on the original publication, disagreed with a lot of views about Lawson at that time: "It is and has been said that Henry has worked his claim out, dug up all his potatoes, knocked down his cheque, burnt out his candle, lost his marbles, spent his remittance, or, in plain English, exhausted his stock of Australian pictures and experiences. After reading several of the short stories in this volume published by Angus and Robertson in paper covers at a shilling — the present writer is not so much inclined to agree with those who prognosticate an early drying-up of the Lawsonian fountain."

In The Sunday Times (Sydney) the reviewer was not so impressed: " As with previous volumes, it is made up of collected stories and sketches that have appeared in local publications, and the result in the present instance is not happy...the volume is made up of short sketches, all cleverly told, but with hardly an exception the incident not worth the telling; and this defect is much more noticeable now they are all brought together."

== See also ==
- Full text of the volume is available at Project Gutenberg Australia.
- 1900 in Australian literature

== Notes ==
This publication was preceded by another short story collection, On the Track, also in 1900. Later that same year the two collections were combined into one volume titled On the Track, and Over the Sliprails.
