= Joe Wilson (character) =

Joe Wilson is a fictional character appearing in several well-known short stories by Australian writer Henry Lawson. Joe Wilson first appeared in "Brighten's Sister-in-law," the first story Lawson wrote after his arrival to England, and the longest he had ever written up to that time. It was first published in Blackwood's Magazine in November 1900.

== Published Joe Wilson Stories ==
Publication order vs. Chronological order
Publication order	Chronological order
1. Brighten's Sister-in-law	1. Joe Wilson's Courtship
2. A Double Buggy at Lahey's Creek	2. Brighten's Sister-in-law
3. Water Them Geraniums	3. Water Them Geraniums
4. Joe Wilson's Courtship	4. A Double Buggy at Lahey's Creek

== Publication ==
"Joe Wilson's Courtship" was the final Joe Wilson story to have been written, though, chronologically, its events take place first. In 1901, when all four stories were published in the collection Joe Wilson and His Mates, the stories were printed in order of narrative chronology.

After the fourth story, Lawson added the following note, under the title "The Writer Wants to Say a Word":

IN writing the first sketch of the Joe Wilson series, which happened to be 'Brighten’s Sister-in-law', I had an idea of making Joe Wilson a strong character. Whether he is or not, the reader must judge. It seems to me that the man’s natural sentimental selfishness, good-nature, 'softness', or weakness—call it which you like—developed as I wrote on.

"I know Joe Wilson very well. He has been through deep trouble since the day he brought the double buggy to Lahey’s Creek. I met him in Sydney the other day. Tall and straight yet— rather straighter than he had been—dressed in a comfortable, serviceable sac suit of 'saddle-tweed', and wearing a new sugar-loaf, cabbage-tree hat, he looked over the hurrying street people calmly as though they were sheep of which he was not in charge, and which were not likely to get 'boxed' with his. Not the worst way in which to regard the world.

He talked deliberately and quietly in all that roar and rush. He is a young man yet, comparatively speaking, but it would take little Mary a long while now to pick the grey hairs out of his head, and the process would leave him pretty bald.

In two or three short sketches in another book I hope to complete the story of his life.

== Reception ==
According to The Oxford Companion to Australian Literature, the sequence of Joe Wilson stories "has been justly admired for its controlled presentation of the process of alienation and disintegration wrought by the experience of bush life." Kerryn Goldsworthy writes that the stories represent "the most sustained example we have of Lawson's skills in narrative and characterisation."

== Adaptations ==
The Joe Wilson stories were adapted into the 1924 silent movie Joe, and the 1998 miniseries Joe Wilson. They were also adapted into a segment of the 1957 movie Three in One.
