= Verses, Popular and Humorous =

Poetry collection by Henry Lawson

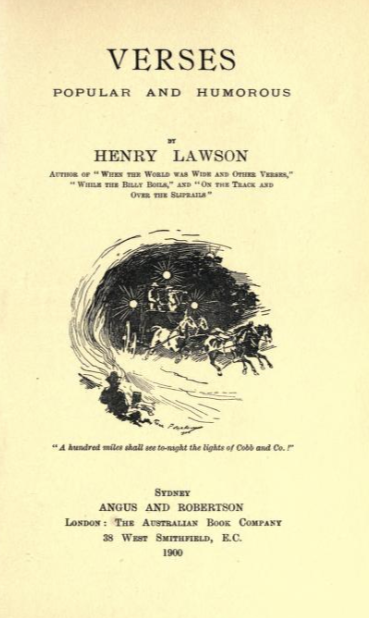
- Title page for Verses, Popular and Humorous (1900)
- Author: Henry Lawson
- Language: English
- Publisher: Angus and Robertson
- Publication date: 1900
- Publication place: Australia
- Media type: Print (hardback & paperback)
- Pages: 244
- Preceded by: In the Days When the World was Wide and Other Verses
- Followed by: On the Track

Verses, Popular and Humorous (1900) was the second collection of poems by Australian poet Henry Lawson. It was released in hardback by Angus and Robertson publishers in 1900. It features some of the poet's early major works, including "The Lights of Cobb and Co", "Saint Peter" and "The Grog-An'-Grumble-Steeplechase". Most of the poems in the volume had been written after the publication of In the Days When the World was Wide and Other Verses in 1896.

The original collection includes 66 poems by the author that are reprinted from various sources. Later publications split the collection into two separate volumes: Popular Verses and Humorous Verses, though the contents differed from the original list.

== Notes ==
- Preface

My acknowledgments of the courtesy of the editors and proprietors of the newspapers in which most of these verses were first published are due and are gratefully discharged on the eve of my departure for England. Chief among them is the Sydney Bulletin; others are the Sydney Town and Country Journal, Freeman's Journal, and Truth, and the New Zealand Mail.

A few new pieces are included in the collection.
H.L.

Sydney, March 17th, 1900.

== Contents ==
- "The Ports of the Open Sea"
- "The Three Kings"
- "The Outside Track"
- "The Rovers"
- "Sydney-Side"
- "Foreign Lands"
- "Mary Lemaine"
- "The Shakedown on the Floor"
- "Reedy River"
- "Old Stone Chimney"
- "Song of the Old Bullock-Driver"
- "The Lights of Cobb and Co."
- "How the Land was Won"
- "The Boss Over the Board"
- "When the Ladies Come to the Shearing Shed"
- "The Ballad of the Rouseabout"
- "Years After the War in Australia"
- "The Old Jimmy Woodser"
- "The Christ of the 'Never'"
- "The Cattle-Dog's Death"
- "The Song of the Darling River"
- "Rain in the Mountains"
- "A May Night on the Mountains"
- "The New Chum Jackeroo"
- "The Dons Of Spain"
- "The Bursting of the Boom"
- "Antony Villa"
- "Second Class Wait Here'
- "The Ships That Won't Go Down"
- "The Men We Might Have Been"
- "The Way of the World"
- "The Battling Days"
- "Written Afterwards"
- "The Uncultured Rhymer To His Cultured Critics"
- "The Writer's Dream"
- "The Jolly Dead March"
- "My Literary Friend"
- "Mary Called Him 'Mister'"
- "Rejected"
- "O'Hara, J.P."
- "Bill and Jim Fall Out"
- "The Paroo"
- "The Green-Hand Rouseabout"
- "The Man from Waterloo"
- "Saint Peter"
- "The Stranger's Friend"
- "The God-Forgotten Election"
- "The Boss's Boots"
- "The Captain of the Push"
- "Billy's 'Square Affair'"
- "A Derry on a Cove"
- "Rise Ye! Rise Ye!"
- "The Ballad of Mabel Clare"
- "Constable M'Carty's Investigations"
- "At the Tug-of-War"
- "Here's Luck!"
- "The Men Who Come Behind"
- "The Days when We went Swimming"
- "The Old Bark School"
- "Trouble on the Selection"
- "The Professional Wanderer"
- "A Little Mistake"
- "A Study in the "Nood""
- "A Word to Texas Jack"
- "The Grog-an'-Grumble Steeplechase"
- "But What's the Use"

== Critical reception ==
Writing in The Age soon after the book's publication a reviewer stated that the poems "...exhibit the old power of rhythm, cynical humor, and knowledge of the seamy side of Australian life, and will not lessen the writer's claim to be the first of purely Australian authors, as distinct from those who have wielded the pen with success to set forth a point of view derived from other lands."

A reviewer in The Queenslander was effusive in their praise: "There is the same keen observation of the under side of life in the colonies, the same acute sympathy with the woes of the swaggie, or the dead-beat, or the horny-handed son of toil, the same socialistic standpoint, and the same hatred of class distinction. Lawson has always been of the people, and has written for the people. He has endeavoured to open the eyes of luxury to the condition of life in those who work in order that such luxury may be enjoyed. He knows the feeling of despair, of hopeless, helpless rage that the sons of labour have against their more fortunate brethren, and in a fearless way he sets down his impressions."

== See also ==
- 1900 in poetry
- 1900 in Australian literature
