= Jack Mitchell (character) =

John "Jack" Mitchell, often referred to only as Mitchell, is a recurring fictional character in short stories and sketches by Australian writer Henry Lawson. He is widely considered one of Lawson's most memorable characters.

== Description ==
Mitchell is a "shrewd, kindly, swagman." In the story "Enter Mitchell", Lawson describes him as "short and stout and bow-legged, and freckled, and sandy. He had red hair and small, twinkling grey eyes, and ‒ what often goes with such things ‒ the expression of a born comedian." Mitchell is usually depicted as a traveller, often accompanied by a companion with whom he shares stories.

Manning Clark characterised Mitchell as follows:

Jack Mitchell knew a thing or two; he had been around. He had the sardonic wit; he expected little from life; he expected nothing but brief pleasure and then never-ending pain from a woman; he knew only one real pleasure in life, in which he let them see how the bushman could "one-up" all comers; he let slip hints of his melancholy, and his conviction that things would never be any different."

Lawson created two Mitchell stories, "Some Day" and "A Camp-fire Yarn", by changing the character name from Marsters to Mitchell, and a third by re-titling "That Swag" to "Enter Mitchell."

== Interpretation ==
Critic John Barnes suggests that Mitchell functions as a persona rather than a fully developed character, replacing the author as narrator and storyteller, an "instrument by which Lawson can create states of feeling and so define his sense of being human." He has been likened to the Romantic outcast figure of The Wanderer. Lawson's Mitchell stories explore the domestic consequences of the bohemian lifestyle. In the 1925 story "Mitchell on Matrimony", we learn that Mitchell's wife has left him, and Mitchell suggests to his companion that husbands should be more considerate of their wives.

== Partial bibliography ==
- "Mitchell: A Character Sketch"
- "On The Edge Of A Plain"
- "'Some Day'"
- "Shooting The Moon"
- "Our Pipes"
- "Bill, the Ventriloquial Rooster"
- "Enter Mitchell"
- "Mitchell Doesn't Believe in the Sack"
- "Another of Mitchell's Plans"
