= On the Track (short story collection) =

Book by Henry Lawson

- 1923 edition
- Author: Henry Lawson
- Language: English
- Genre: Short story collection
- Publisher: Angus and Robertson
- Publication date: 1900
- Publication place: Australia
- Media type: Print (hardback & paperback)
- Pages: 157pp
- Preceded by: Verses, Popular and Humorous
- Followed by: Over the Sliprails

On the Track (1900) is a collection of short stories by Australian poet and author Henry Lawson. It was released in hardback by Angus and Robertson in 1900, and features one of the author's better known stories in "Bill, the Ventriloquial Rooster", as well as a number of lesser known works.

The collection contains nineteen stories which are mostly reprinted from a variety of newspaper and magazine sources, with several published here for the first time.

== Contents ==
- "The Songs They Used To Sing"
- "A Vision of Sandy Blight"
- "Andy Page's Rival"
- "The Iron-Bark Chip"
- "Middleton's Peter"
- "The Mystery of Dave Regan"
- "Mitchell on Matrimony"
- "Mitchell on Women"
- "No Place for a Woman"
- "Mitchell's Jobs"
- "Bill, the Ventriloquial Rooster"
- "Bush Cats"
- "Meeting Old Mates"
- "Two Larrikins"
- "Mr Smellingscheck"
- "A Rough Shed"
- "Payable Gold"
- "An Oversight of Steelman's"
- "How Steelman Told His Story"

== Critical reception ==
A reviewer in The Freeman's Journal (Sydney) noted that the collection is "a very representative collection of Henry Lawson's inimitable bush sketches. Many of these have appeared from time to time in various Australian journals, including the Freeman, but the collection will not suffer in popular estimation on that account, for it makes up a very interesting volume of Lawson at his best."

In The Evening News (Sydney) the reviewer was not so impressed: "The stories are written with all Lawson's well-known descriptive power, and one regrets that the author does not occasionally give us some different phase of bush life to the sordid side that, he is so fond of. The unlovely swaggie is not even picturesque, and he is decidedly wearisome. Lawson might, now and then strike a higher note and relieve us from the ever-haunting presence of Bill and Jim with their swags and 'nosebags.' It seems strange that one who can so well appreciate the poetry of the bush in verse persistently ignores it in prose."

== See also ==
- Full text of the volume is available at Project Gutenberg Australia
- 1900 in Australian literature

== Notes ==
This publication was followed by another short story collection, Over the Sliprails, also in 1900. Later that same year the two collections were combined into one volume titled On the Track, and Over the Sliprails.
