= Sketch story =

Literary form

A sketch story, literary sketch or simply sketch, is a piece of writing that is generally shorter than a short story, and contains very little, if any, plot. The genre was invented after the 16th century in England, as a result of increasing public interest in realistic depictions of "exotic" locales. The term was most popularly used in the late nineteenth century. As a literary work, it is also often referred to simply as "the sketch".

== Style ==
A sketch is mainly descriptive, either of places (travel sketch) or of people (character sketch). Writers of sketches like Washington Irving clearly used the artist as a model. A sketch story is a hybrid form. It may contain little or no plot, instead describing impressions of people or places, and is often informal in tone.

In the nineteenth century, sketch stories were frequently published in magazines, before falling out of favor. Such stories may focus on individual moments, leaving the reader to imagine for themselves the events that led to this occasion and to wonder what events will follow. Writers from Sherwood Anderson to John Updike used this form, often as a hybrid. In short, a sketch story aims at "suggestiveness rather than explicitness".

== Modern usage ==
In modern usage, the term "short story" embraces what was once popularly termed "the sketch". Short stories of extreme brevity still exist under the names flash fiction or microfiction.

== Popular writers of sketch stories ==
- Anton Chekhov (1860–1904): A major Russian short story writer and playwright. The point of a typical Chekhov story is most often what happens within a given character, and that is conveyed indirectly, by suggestion, or by significant detail. Chekhov eschews the traditional build-up of chronological detail, instead emphasizing moments of epiphany and illumination over a significantly shorter period of time.
- Washington Irving (1783–1859): Most popular for The Sketch Book of Geoffrey Crayon, Gent., a book of thirty essays and short stories.
- Ernest Hemingway (1899–1961): Hemingway used sketches and conventional stories to depict the fictional Nick Adams character, as collected in The Nick Adams Stories (1972), "The Last Good Country" and "Summer People" and others.
- James Agee (1909–1955): Agee's "Knoxville: Summer of 1915" is a semi-autobiographical literary sketch describing a summer evening experienced in Knoxville, Tennessee, as a boy. It was originally written in 1935 and appears as a prelude to the novel A Death in the Family (1957).
- Henry Lawson (1867–1922): Australian writer Henry Lawson is noted for his sketch stories, many featuring recurring characters such as Jack Mitchell and Steelman and Smith. In 1933, Edward Garnett praised Lawson's sketches, once observing that "Lawson gets even more feeling observation and atmosphere into a page than does Hemingway." Lawson, himself, was a firm believer in the merits of "the sketch":
  I thought the short story was a lazy man's game, second to 'free' verse, compared with the sketch. The sketch, to be really good, must be good in every line. But the sketch story is best of all.
- Saki (1870–1916): Edwardian satirist, first published in the Westminster Gazette. His short stories were collected as books still in print 100 years later. His Parliamentary sketches were popular at the time.
- Saadat Hassan Manto (1912–1955): Combining psychoanalysis with human behavior, Manto was arguably one of the best short storytellers of the 20th century, and one of the most controversial as well. When it comes to chronicling the collective madness that prevailed, during and after the Partition of India in 1947, no other writer comes close to the oeuvre of Saadat Hassan Manto.
- Ivan Cankar (1878–1918): a major contributor to Slovene modernist literature, known for his symbolist sketches and other short stories.
