= The Union Buries Its Dead =

1893 short story by Henry Lawson

- Short story by Henry Lawson
- Country: Australia
- Language: English

Publication
- Published in: Truth
- Media type: print (periodical)
- Publication date: 16 April 1893

"The Union Buries Its Dead" is a well-known sketch story by iconic Australian writer and poet Henry Lawson. It was originally published in Truth on 16 April 1893 with the title: "The Union Buries Its Dead : A Bushman's Funeral. A Sketch from Life".

The story takes place in Bourke, and concerns the burial of an anonymous union labourer, who had drowned the previous day "while trying to swim some horses across a billabong of the Darling." The narrator, possibly Lawson himself, examines the level of respect the Bushfolk have for the dead, supplementing the story with his trademark dry, sardonic humour.

== Plot summary ==
The story opens with the unnamed narrator and his party, boating on the Darling River, coming across a young man on horseback driving some horses along the bank. The young man asks if the water is too deep to cross, to which a joker in the party replies that it is deep enough to drown him. The young man continues up the river.

The following day, a funeral gathers at a corner pub, the deceased being the young horsemen encountered the previous day. The anonymous man is a union member, however, little more is known about him. Though the "defunct" is of a different religion to the majority of the town, they, nonetheless, organise a respectful burial as "unionism is stronger than creed."

"Drink, however, is stronger than unionism," and, by the time the hearse passes by the pub, "more than two-thirds of the funeral were unable to follow."

The narrator and his party respectfully follow the dwindling funeral procession, observing the conflict between the Bushfolks' respect for the dead, and their own personal comfort. The burial itself is sombre, yet emotionless. Nobody actually knew the deceased, and so it is impossible to feel sad for him. It is heard that the young man's name is James Tyson, though this is "simply the name he went by." The narrator does eventually hear the man's real name, but he has already forgotten it.

== Characters ==
"The Union Buries Its Dead" dedicates very few words to describing any one character in detail; this effectively creates a sense of detachment from everyone, especially the deceased union member.

- Narrator:
  - He respectfully follows the funeral procession, despite feeling no emotional attachment to the deceased. The narrator is often taken to be Lawson himself.
- James Tyson:
  - The "defunct." J.T. wasn't his real name- "only 'the name he went by.'" He was a 'Roman,' and a young union labourer, of about twenty-five years. He had drowned while trying to swim his horses across a billabong of the Darling River.

The story was adapted for the first part of the trilogy film Three in One produced by Cecil Holmes and released in 1957. The screenplay by Rex Rienits is called Joe Wilson's Mates. Support for unionism is depicted by an increasing number of town and farm folk falling in behind the hearse as it moves to the cemetery. Edmund Allison strongly plays a union loyalist who emerges as leader.

== Lawson's avoidance of stock conventions ==
Lawson also takes time, nearing the end of the sketch, to draw attention to his own avoidance of the usual stock conventions.

"I have left out the wattle- because it wasn't there. I have also neglected to mention the heart-broken old mate, with his grizzled head bowed and great pearly drops streaming down his rugged cheeks. He was absent- he was probably 'Out Back.' For similar reasons I have omitted reference to the suspicious moisture in the eyes of a bearded bush ruffian named Bill. Bill failed to turn up, and the only moisture was that which was induced by the heat. I have left out the 'sad Australian sunset' because the sun was not going down at the time. The burial took place exactly at mid-day."

In many of his weaker stories, Lawson himself falls back upon the stock emotive devices he quite obviously disdained when he wrote this particular sketch.

It is this attitude towards the romanticisation of Bushlife that ultimately lead to the Bulletin Debate, during which the two popular poets, Lawson and Andrew Barton "Banjo" Paterson engaged in verse controversy by publishing numerous poems in the weekly Bulletin in 1892-93.

== Factual basis of story ==
In 1902 Lawson wrote: '"The Union Buries Its Dead" is simply an unornimented (sic) description of a funeral I took part in Bourk (sic) N.S.W.- it is true in every detail- even to the paragraph re the drowning of a man named Tyson having appeared in a Sydney Daily.'

William Wood, writing from Paraguay in 1931, recalled knowing Lawson during his stay in Bourke: 'I was present, with other Union officials, at the funeral described by Henry in "The Union Buries Its Dead" and still remember many of the details so humorously described... The cemetery was a good step from town and many of the mourners developed a strong thirst long before the first pub was met on the way back.'.

The text mentions the drowned Union Member's name as James Tyson, though this is "only the name he went by." James Tyson (1819–1898), a squatter, was reputed to be the wealthiest and meanest man in the whole continent.

== Quotes ==
- "You'd have taken more notice if you'd known he was doomed to die in the hour."
- "They were strangers to us who were on foot, and we to them. We were all strangers to the corpse."
- "They have too much respect for the dead."
- "Just here man's ignorance and vanity made a farce of the funeral."
- "A few shoved their hats on and off uneasily, struggling between their disgust for the living and their respect for the dead."
- "It didn't matter much- nothing does."
- "The fall of lumps of clay on a stranger's coffin doesn't sound any different from the fall of the same things on an ordinary wooden box- at least I didn't notice anything awesome or unusual in the sound."
- "I have left out the wattle- because it wasn't there..."
- "But unionism is stronger than creed... Drink, however, is stronger than unionism."

== Publication details ==
- First Published: Truth, 16 April 1893, under the title "A Bushman's Funeral: A Sketch For Life".
- Source: The Country I Come From, Edinburgh and London, Blackwood, 1901

== See also ==
- 1893 in Australian literature
