= Henry Lawson =

Australian writer and poet (1867–1922)

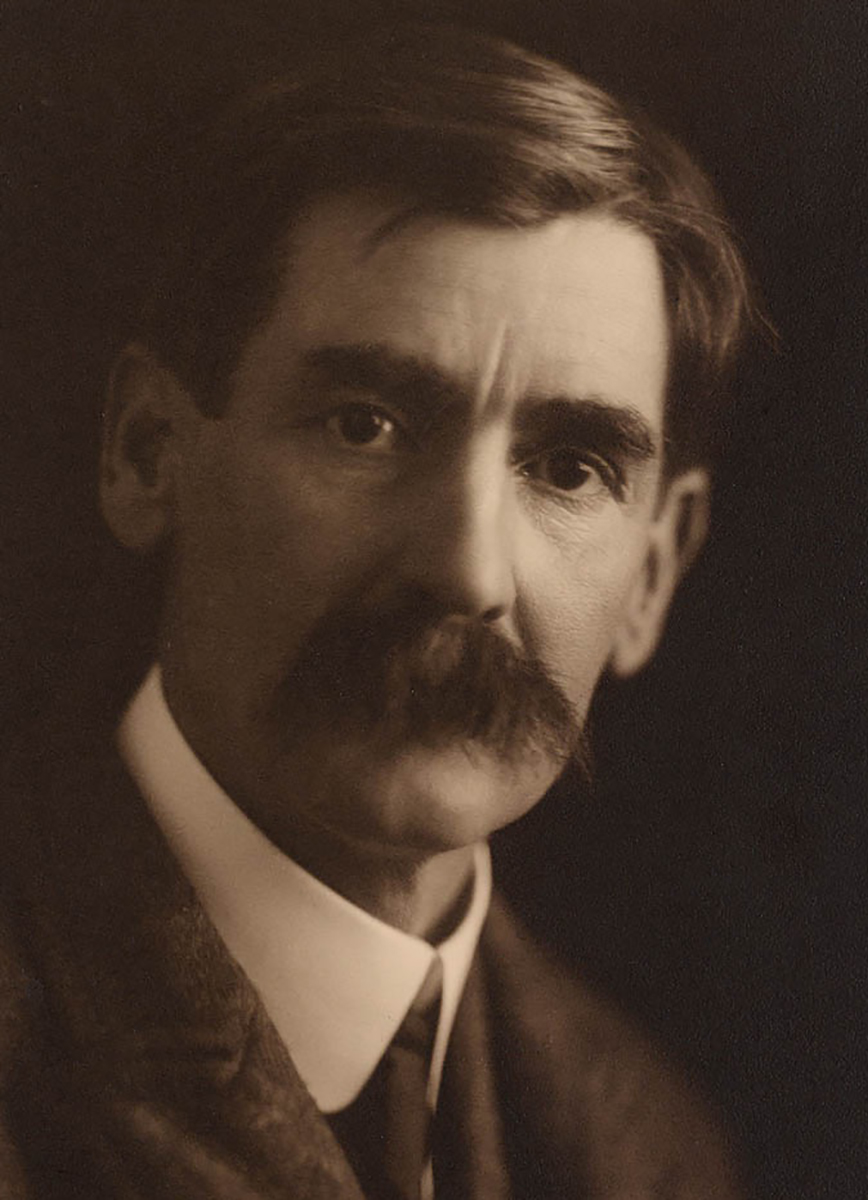
- Lawson c. 1915
- Born: Henry Archibald Hertzberg Lawson; 17 June 1867; Grenfell, New South Wales, Australia
- Died: 2 September 1922 (aged 55); Sydney, New South Wales, Australia
- Occupations: Author, poet, balladist
- Spouse: Bertha Marie Louise Bredt (m. 1896; div. 1903)
- Children: 2
- Relatives: Louisa Lawson (mother); Bertha McNamara (mother-in-law); Jack Lang (brother-in-law)

Henry Archibald Hertzberg Lawson (17 June 1867 – 2 September 1922) was an Australian writer and bush poet. Along with his contemporary Banjo Paterson, Lawson is among the best-known Australian poets and fiction writers of the colonial period and is often called Australia's "greatest short story writer".

A vocal nationalist and republican, Lawson regularly contributed to The Bulletin, and many of his works helped popularise the Australian vernacular in fiction. He wrote prolifically into the 1890s, after which his output declined, in part due to struggles with alcoholism and mental illness. At times destitute, he spent periods in Darlinghurst Gaol and psychiatric institutions. After he died in 1922 following a cerebral haemorrhage, Lawson became the first Australian writer to be granted a state funeral.

He was the son of the poet, publisher and feminist Louisa Lawson.

== Family and early life ==
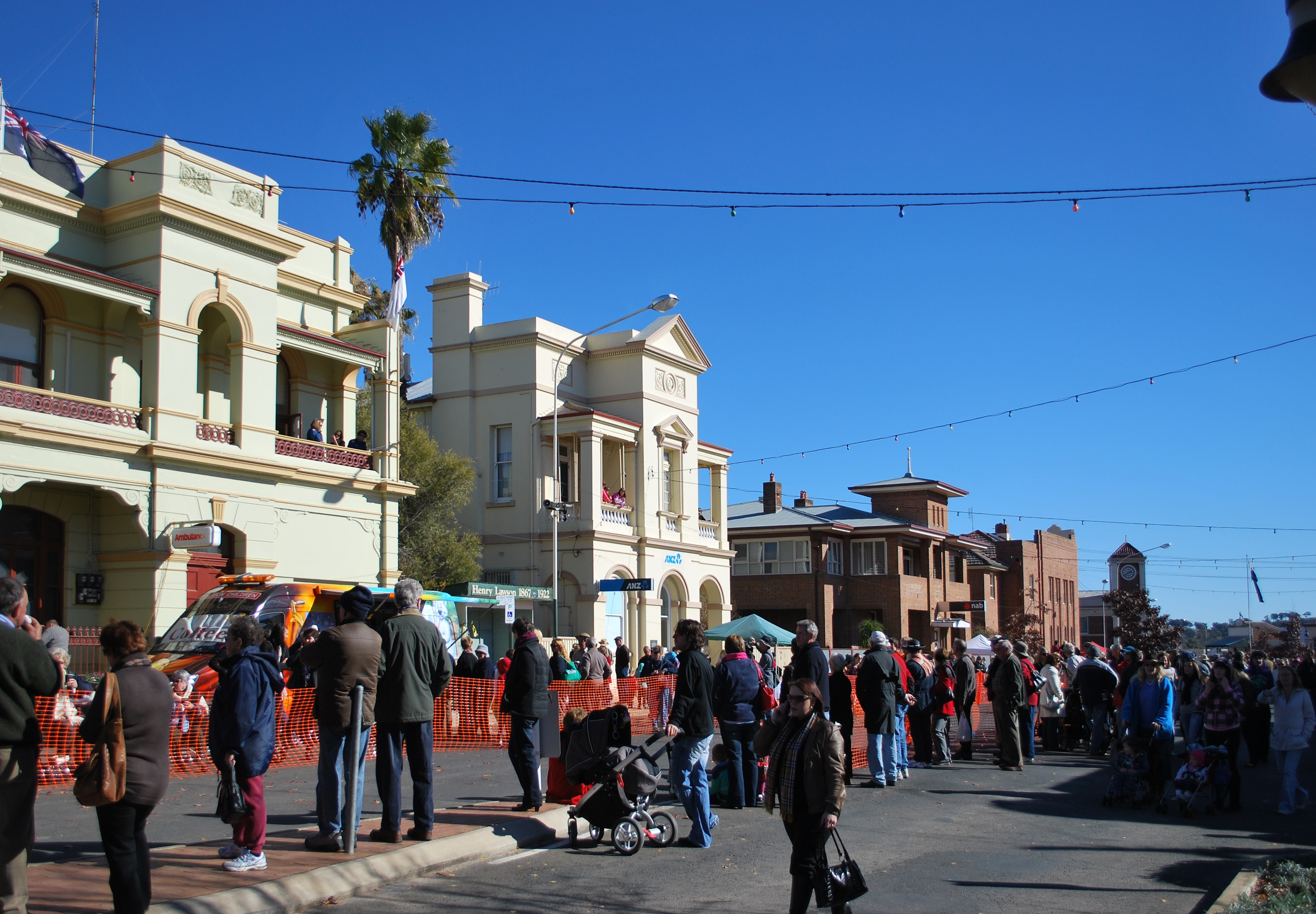
Grenfell, Lawson's birthplace, during the 2011 Henry Lawson Festival

Henry Lawson was born 17 June 1867 in a town on the Grenfell goldfields of New South Wales. His father was Niels Hertzberg Larsen, a Norwegian-born miner. Niels Larsen went to sea at 21 and arrived in Melbourne in 1855 to join the gold rush, along with partner William Henry John Slee. Lawson's parents met at the goldfields of Pipeclay (now Eurunderee, Locality Mudgee). Niels and Louisa Albury (1848–1920) married on 7 July 1866 when he was 32 and she 18. On Henry's birth, the family surname was Anglicised and Niels became Peter Lawson. The newly married couple were to have an unhappy marriage. Peter Lawson's grave (with headstone) is in the little private cemetery at Hartley Vale, New South Wales, a few minutes' walk behind what was Collitt's Inn.

Lawson attended school at Eurunderee from 2 October 1876 but experienced an ear infection around this time. It left him with partial deafness and by the age of fourteen he had lost his hearing entirely. However, his master John Tierney was kind and did all he could for Lawson, who was quite shy. Lawson later attended a Catholic school at Mudgee, New South Wales around 8 km away; the master there, Mr Kevan, would teach Lawson about poetry. Lawson was a keen reader of Dickens and Marryat and Australian novels such as Marcus Clarke's For the Term of His Natural Life (1874) and Rolf Boldrewood's Robbery Under Arms (1882); an aunt had also given him a volume by Bret Harte. Reading became a major source of his education because, due to his deafness, he had trouble learning in the classroom.

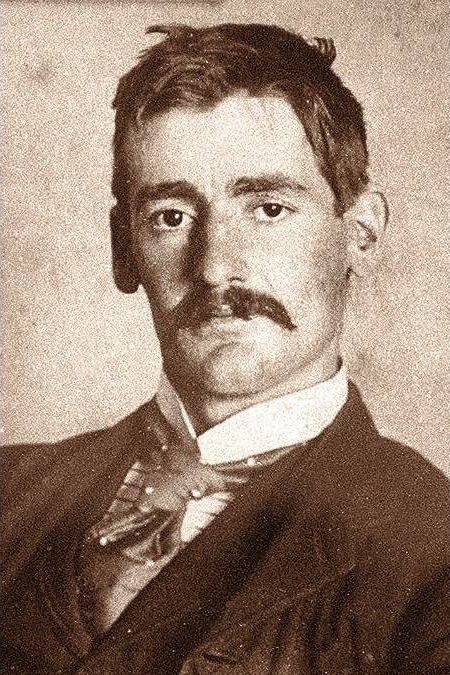
Portrait of Lawson, c. 1902

In 1883, after working on building jobs with his father in the Blue Mountains, Lawson joined his mother in Sydney at her request. Louisa was then living with Henry's sister and brother. At this time, Lawson was working during the day and studying at night for his matriculation in the hopes of receiving a university education. However, he failed his exams. Lawson lived in a boarding house along William Street and wrote a poem titled William Street. Lawson also spent time in Newcastle at the Wickham School of Arts while working for the Hudson Brothers branch railway workshops. He remarked that he "haunted the School of Arts, still with an idea of learning before it was too late." At around 20 years of age Lawson went to the eye and ear hospital in Melbourne but nothing could be done for his deafness.

In 1890 he began a relationship with Mary Gilmore. She writes of an unofficial engagement and Lawson's wish to marry her, but it was broken by his frequent absences from Sydney. The story of the relationship is told in Anne Brooksbank's play All My Love.

In 1896, Lawson married Bertha Bredt, Jr., daughter of Bertha Bredt, the prominent socialist. The marriage ended very unhappily. Bertha filed for divorce and in her affidavit she stated:

My husband has during three years and upwards been a habitual drunkard and habitually been guilty of cruelty towards me. My affidavit consists of the acts and matters following. That my husband during the last three years struck me in the face and about the body and blacked my eye and hit me with a bottle and attempted to stab me and pulled me out of bed when I was ill and purposely made a noise in my room when I was ill and pulled my hair and repeatedly used abusive and insulting language to me and was guilty of divers other acts of cruelty to me whereby my health and safety are endangered.

A judicial separation was granted and was declared in June 1903. They had two children, son Jim (Joseph) and daughter Bertha.

== Poetry and prose writing ==
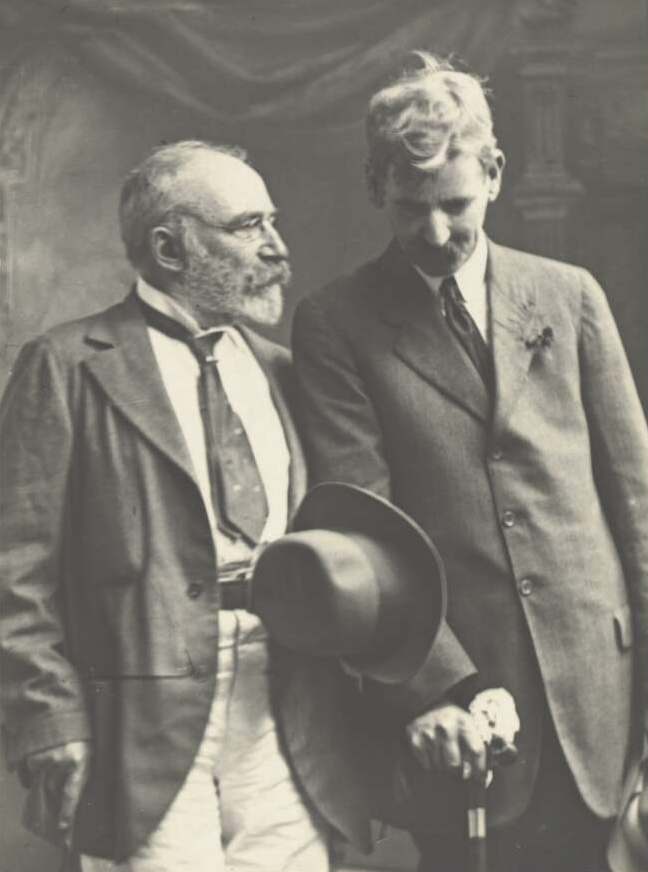
Lawson (right) with J. F. Archibald, founder of The Bulletin

Henry Lawson's first published poem was 'A Song of the Republic' which appeared in The Bulletin, 1 October 1887; his mother's republican friends were an influence. This was followed by 'The Wreck of the Derry Castle' and then 'Golden Gully.' Prefixed to the former poem was an editorial note:

In publishing the subjoined verses we take pleasure in stating that the writer is a boy of 17 years, a young Australian, who has as yet had an imperfect education and is earning his living under some difficulties as a housepainter, a youth whose poetic genius here speaks eloquently for itself.

Lawson was 20 years old, not 17.

In 1890–1891 Lawson worked in Albany. He then received an offer to write for the Brisbane Boomerang in 1891, but he lasted only around 7–8 months as the Boomerang was soon in trouble. While in Brisbane he contributed to William Lane's Worker; he later angled for an editorial position with the similarly named Worker of Sydney, but was unsuccessful. He returned to Sydney and continued to write for the Bulletin which, in 1892, paid for an inland trip where he experienced the harsh realities of drought-affected New South Wales. He also worked as a roustabout in the woolshed at Toorale Station. This resulted in his contributions to the Bulletin Debate and became a source for many of his stories in subsequent years. Elder writes of the trek Lawson took between Hungerford and Bourke as "the most important trek in Australian literary history" and says that "it confirmed all his prejudices about the Australian bush. Lawson had no romantic illusions about a 'rural idyll'." As Elder continues, his grim view of the outback was far removed from "the romantic idyll of brave horsemen and beautiful scenery depicted in the poetry of Banjo Paterson".

Lawson's most successful prose collection is While the Billy Boils, published in 1896. In it he "continued his assault on Paterson and the romantics, and in the process, virtually reinvented Australian realism". Elder writes that "he used short, sharp sentences, with language as raw as Ernest Hemingway or Raymond Carver. With sparse adjectives and honed-to-the-bone description, Lawson created a style and defined Australians: dryly laconic, passionately egalitarian and deeply humane." Most of his work focuses on the Australian bush, such as the desolate "Past Carin'", and is considered by some to be among the first accurate descriptions of Australian life as it was at the time. "The Drover's Wife" with its "heart-breaking depiction of bleakness and loneliness" is regarded as one of his finest short stories. It is regularly studied in schools and has often been adapted for film and theatre.

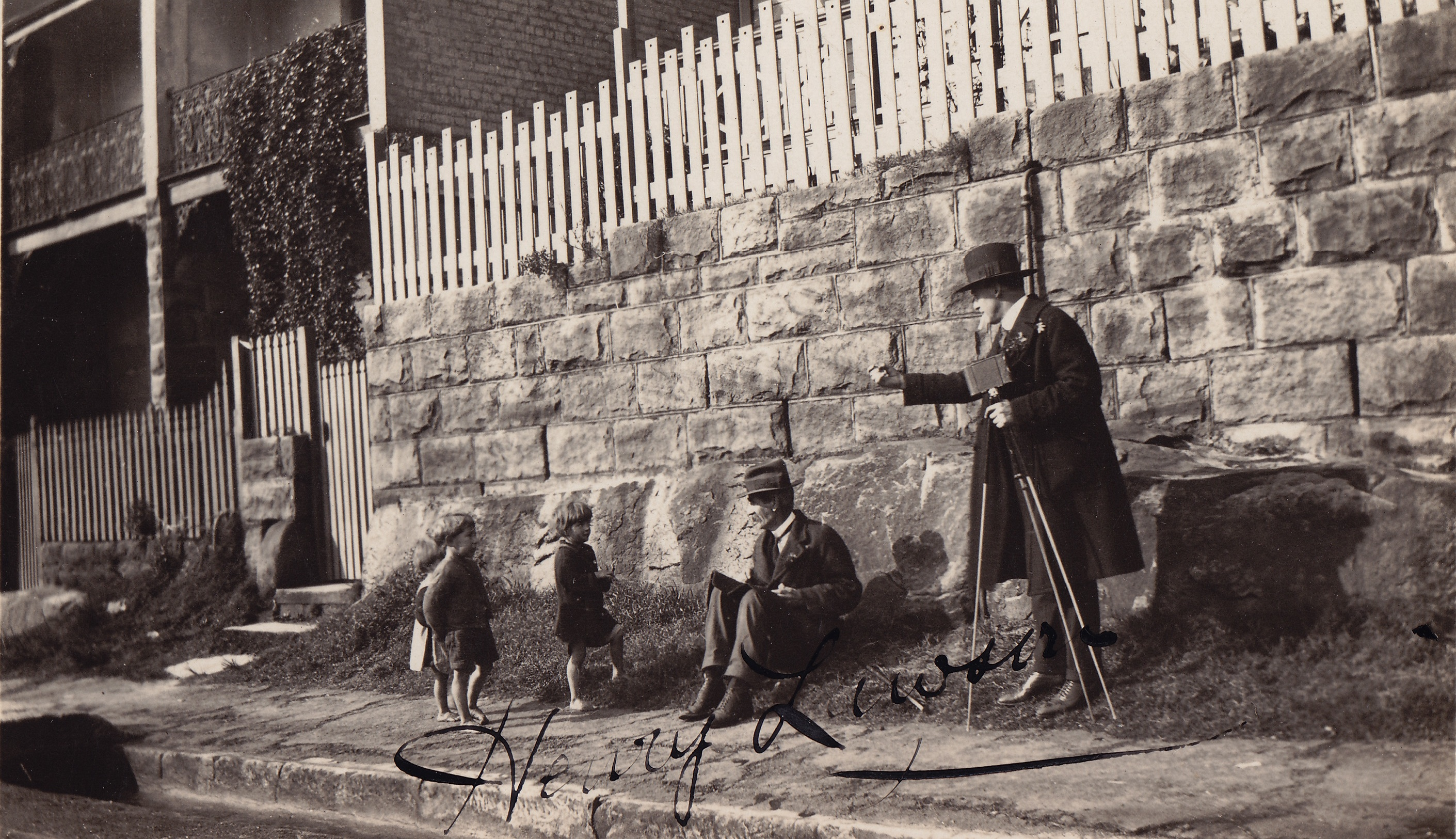
Henry Lawson and children (1922), Royal Australian Historical Society/Osborne Collection

Lawson was a firm believer in the merits of the sketch story, commonly known simply as 'the sketch,' claiming that "the sketch story is best of all." Lawson's Jack Mitchell story On the Edge of a Plain is often cited as one of the most accomplished examples of the sketch.

Like the majority of Australians, Lawson lived in a city, but had had plenty of experience in outback life, in fact, many of his stories reflected his experiences in real life. In Sydney in 1898 he was a prominent member of the Dawn and Dusk Club, a bohemian club of writer friends who met for drinks and conversation.

== Later years ==
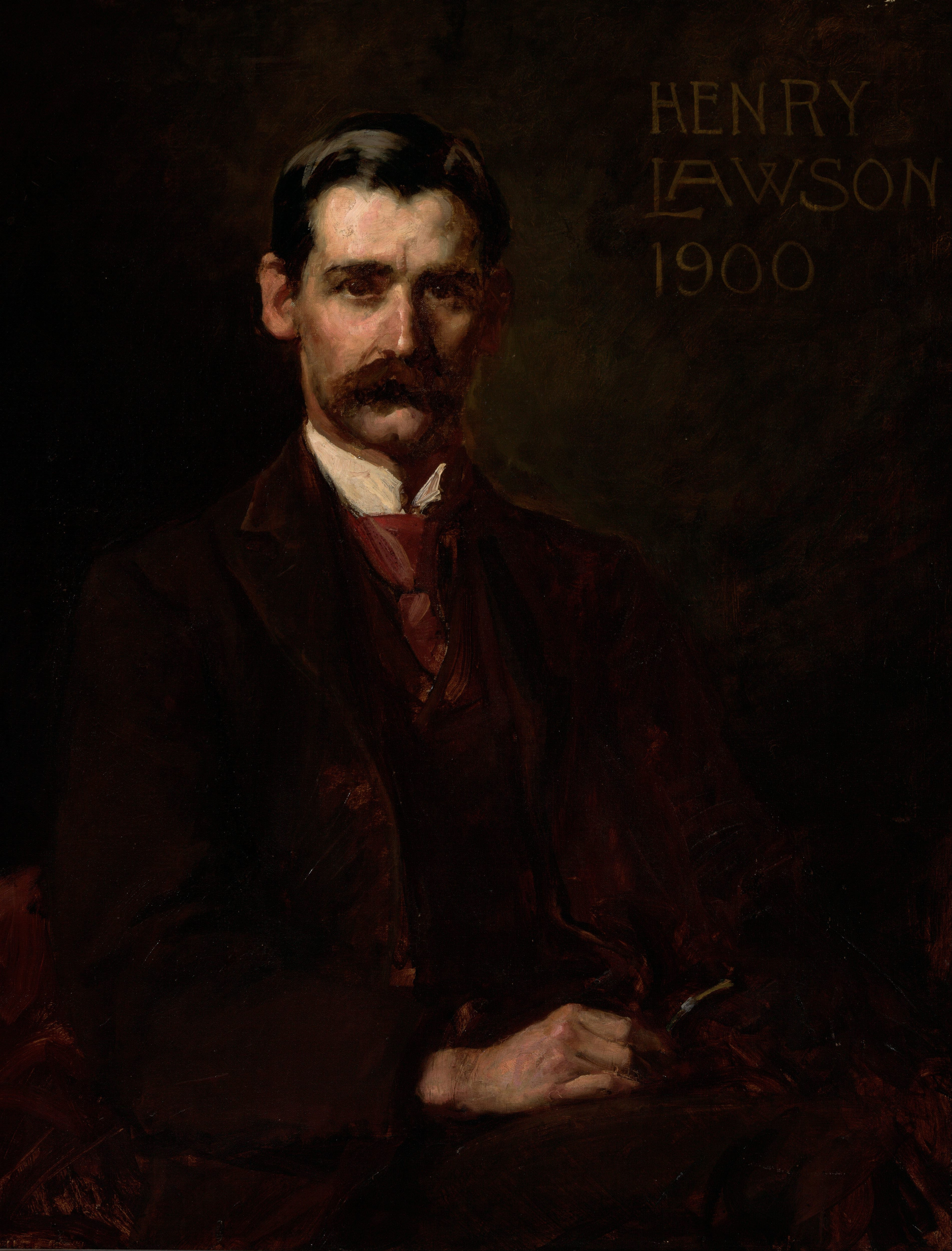
Portrait of Lawson by John Longstaff, 1900, Art Gallery of New South Wales

In 1903 he bought a room at Mrs Isabel Byers' Coffee Palace in North Sydney. This marked the beginning of a 20-year friendship between Mrs Byers and Lawson. Despite his position as the most celebrated Australian writer of the time, Lawson was deeply depressed and perpetually poor. He lacked money due to unfortunate royalty deals with publishers. His ex-wife repeatedly reported him for non-payment of child maintenance. He was gaoled at Darlinghurst Gaol for drunkenness, wife desertion, child desertion, and non-payment of child support seven times between 1905 and 1909, for a total of 159 days and recorded his experience in the haunting poem "One Hundred and Three" (his prison number) which was published in 1908. He refers to the prison as "Starvinghurst Gaol" because of the meagre rations given to the inmates.

At this time, Lawson became withdrawn, alcoholic, and unable to carry on the usual routine of life.

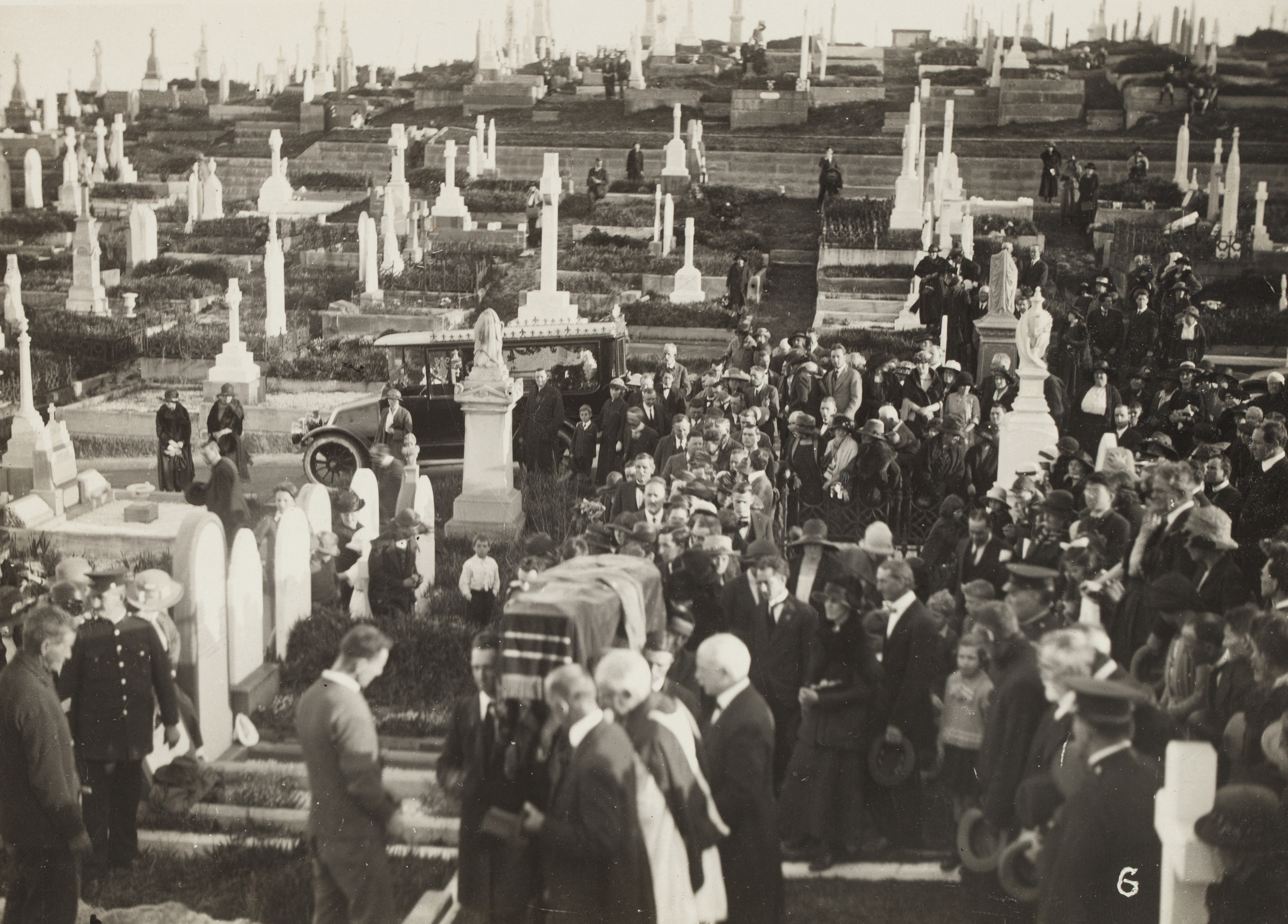
Henry Lawson's funeral, at Waverley Cemetery, Sydney, September 1922

Mrs Byers (née Ward) was an excellent poet herself and, although of modest education, had been writing vivid poetry since her teens in a similar style to Lawson's. Long separated from her husband and elderly, Mrs Byers was, at the time she met Lawson, a woman of independent means looking forward to retirement. Byers regarded Lawson as Australia's greatest living poet, and hoped to sustain him well enough to keep him writing. She negotiated on his behalf with publishers, helped to arrange contact with his children, contacted friends and supporters to help him financially, and assisted and nursed him through his mental and alcohol problems. She wrote countless letters on his behalf and knocked on any doors that could provide Henry with financial assistance or a publishing deal.

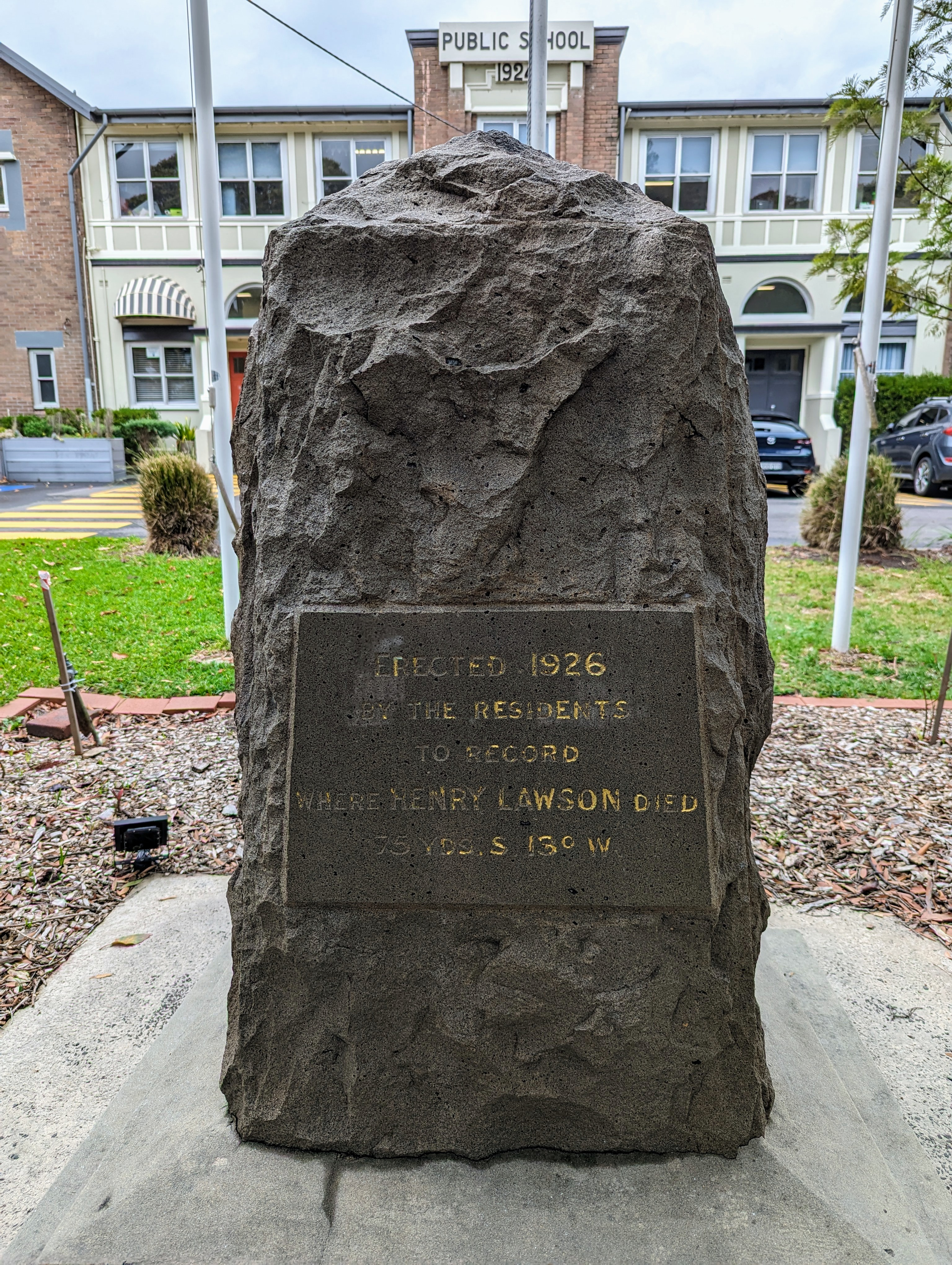
Memorial to Henry Lawson near the site of his death in Abbotsford

It was in Mrs Isabel Byers' home that Henry Lawson died, of a cerebral hemorrhage, in Abbotsford, Sydney in 1922. He was given a state funeral. His death registration on the NSW Births, Deaths & Marriages index is ref. 10451/1922 and was recorded at the Petersham Registration District. It shows his parents as Peter and Louisa. His funeral was attended by the Prime Minister Billy Hughes and the (later) Premier of New South Wales, Jack Lang (who was the husband of Lawson's sister-in-law Hilda Bredt), as well as thousands of citizens. He is interred at Waverley Cemetery Lawson was the first person to be granted a New South Wales state funeral (traditionally reserved for Governors, Chief Justices, etc.) on the grounds of having been a 'distinguished citizen'.

== Honours and legacy ==
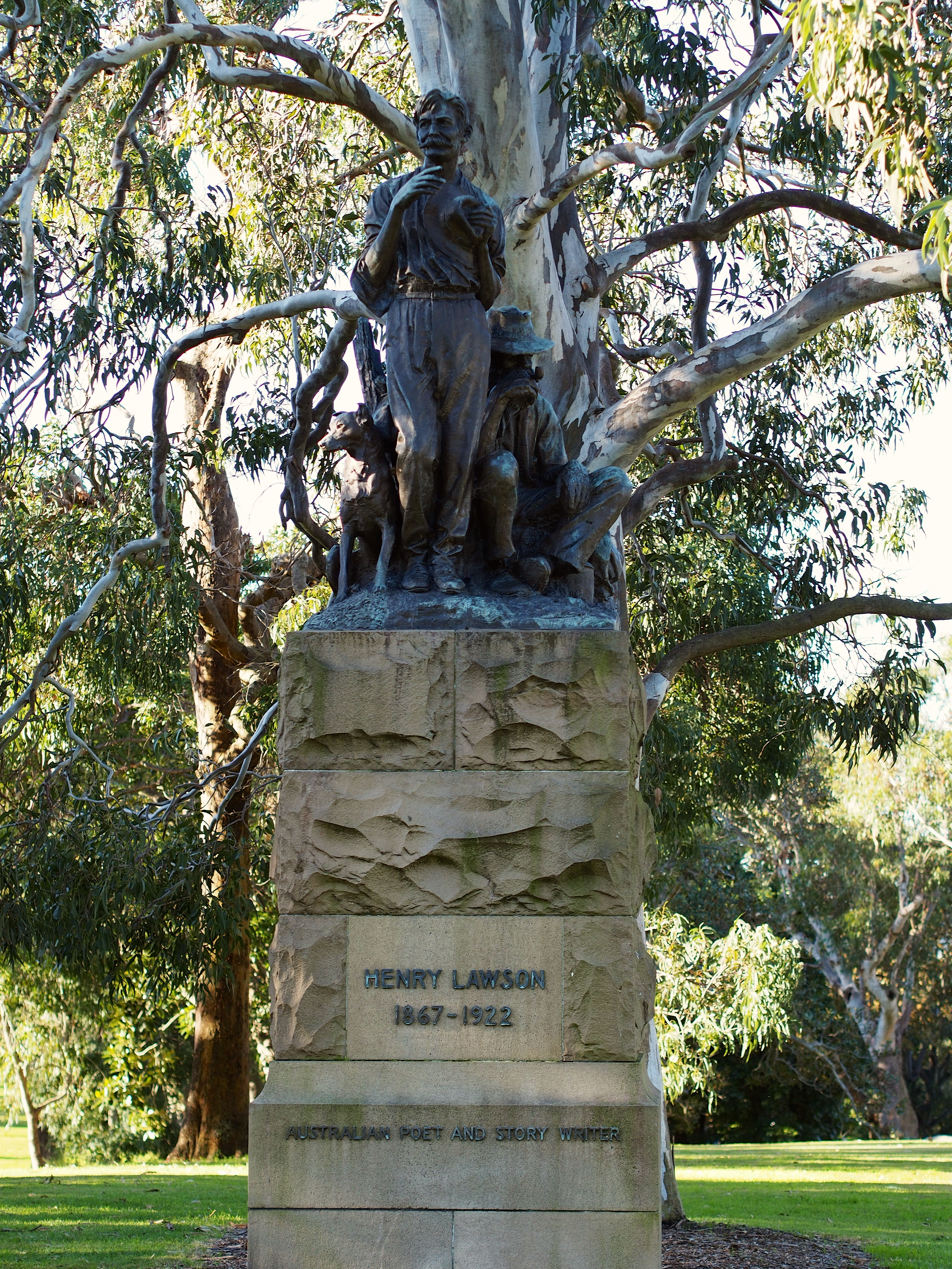
Bronze statue of Lawson accompanied by a swagman and dog, The Domain, Sydney, designed by George Washington Lambert and unveiled in 1931

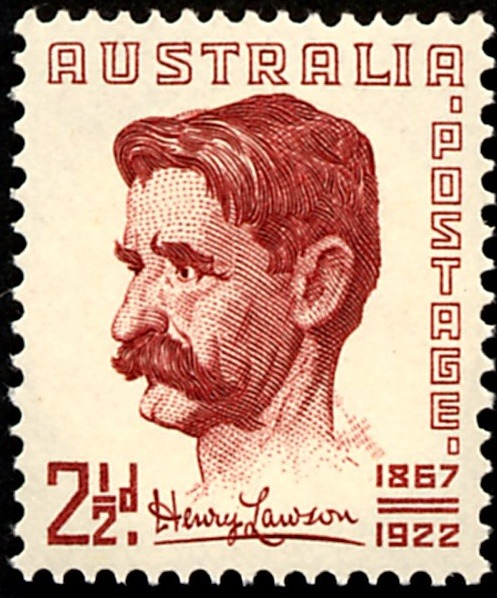
Henry Lawson honoured in 1949

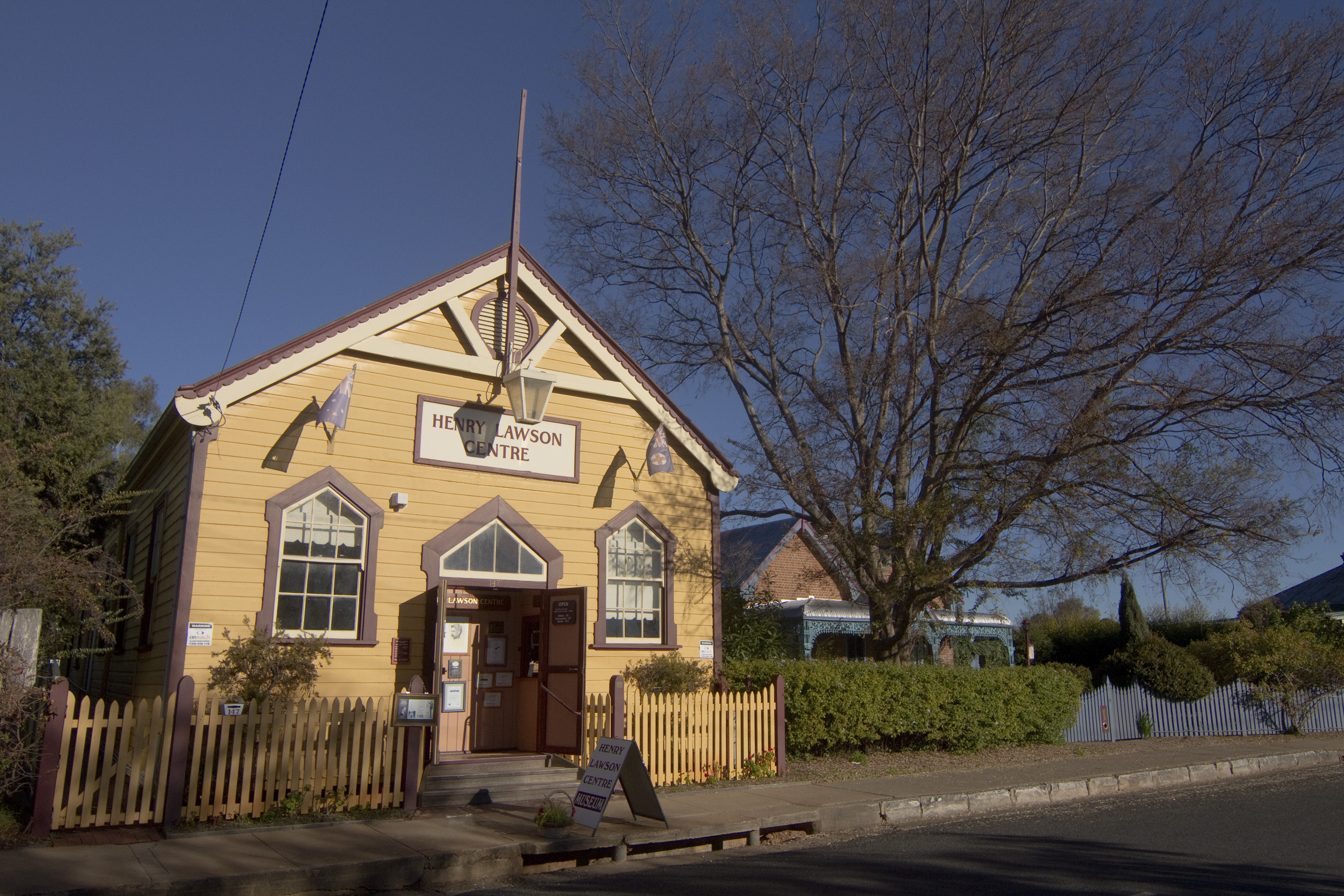
Henry Lawson Centre, Gulgong

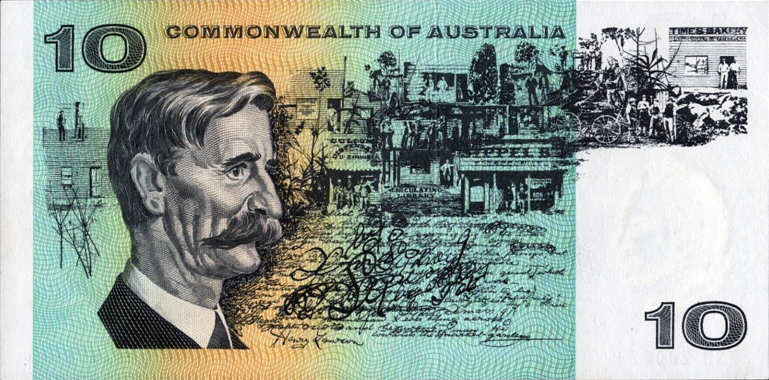
Henry Lawson on the reverse of a 10 Australian dollar banknote (1966-1993)

A bronze statue of Lawson accompanied by a swagman, a dog and a fencepost (reflecting his writing) stands in The Domain, Sydney. The Henry Lawson Memorial committee raised money through public donation to commission the statue by sculptor George Washington Lambert in 1927. The work was unveiled on 28 July 1931 by the Governor of New South Wales, Sir Philip Game.

In 1949 Lawson was the subject of an Australian postage stamp.

Lawson's "The Drover's Wife" short story was featured on a 1991 $1.20 stamp, and a 2017 $1.00 stamp, both from Australia Post.

In 2017 Lawson was again featured on two Australian postage stamps, one featuring Mitchell: A Character Sketch and the other The Drover's Wife and family, including dog, pitted against the snake.

He was featured on the first (paper) Australian ten-dollar note issued in 1966 when decimal currency was first introduced into Australia. Lawson was pictured against scenes from the town of Gulgong in NSW. This note was replaced by a polymer note in 1993; the polymer series had different people featured on the notes.

Lawson's treatment (or lack thereof) of Aboriginal Australians in his work has been criticised and debated. Author Ryan Butta writes that there are some "glaring omissions" in Lawson's writings about Bourke, in particular the Afghan cameleers who were there at the time, and being written about in local newspapers, and who were responsible for opening up the interior of the continent.

In 2024, to celebrate the 75th anniversary of diplomatic relationship between Australia and Indonesia, Indonesian composer Ananda Sukarlan was commissioned to set one of his poems to music, and Sukarlan chose "On the Night Train". It was premiered by the soprano Mariska Setiawan and the strings of the Melbourne Symphony Orchestra

== Henry Lawson Festivals ==
Currently the NSW towns of Gulgong and Grenfell both host Henry Lawson Festivals, with the Grenfell Festival also incorporating a literary competition.

== Bibliography ==
=== Collections ===
- Short Stories in Prose and Verse (1894) - short stories, prose, poetry
- While the Billy Boils (1896) - short stories
- In the Days When the World was Wide and Other Verses (1896) - poetry
- Verses, Popular and Humorous (1900) - poetry
- On the Track (1900) - short stories
- Over the Sliprails (1900) - short stories
- On the Track, and, Over the Sliprails (1900) - short stories
- Popular Verses (1900) - poetry
- Humorous Verses (1900) - poetry
- The Country I Come From (1901) - short stories
- Joe Wilson and His Mates (1901) - short stories
- Children of the Bush (1902) - short stories, prose, poetry
- When I Was King and Other Verses (1905) - poetry
- The Elder Son (1905) - poetry
- When I Was King (1905) - poetry
- The Romance of the Swag (1907) - short stories, prose
- Send Round the Hat (1907) - short stories
- The Skyline Riders and Other Verses (1910) - poetry
- The Rising of the Court and Other Sketches in Prose and Verse (1910) - short stories, prose, poetry
- For Australia and Other Poems (1913) - poetry
- Triangles of Life and Other Stories (1913) - short stories
- My Army, O, My Army! and Other Songs (1915) - poetry
- Song of the Dardanelles and Other Verses (1916) - poetry
- Selected Poems of Henry Lawson (1918) - poetry

=== Posthumous collections ===
- Poems of Henry Lawson (1973)
- The Best of Henry Lawson for Young Australians (1973)
- The Drover's Wife and Other Stories (1974)
- The World of Henry Lawson (1974)
- The Poems of Henry Lawson (1975)
- Poems of Henry Lawson : Volume Two (1975)
- Favourite Stories (1976)
- Henry Lawson : favourite verse (1978)
- Henry Lawson Poems (1979)
- Henry Lawson's Mates : The Complete Stories of Henry Lawson (1979)
- The Essential Henry Lawson : The Best Works of Australia's Greatest Writer (1982)
- A Camp-Fire Yarn: Henry Lawson Complete Works 1885-1900 (1984)
- A Fantasy of Man: Henry Lawson Complete Works 1901-1922 (1984)
- Henry Lawson Favourites (1984)
- Henry Lawson, The Master Story-Teller : Prose Writings (1984)
- The Penguin Henry Lawson Short Stories (1986)
- The Songs of Henry Lawson (1989)
- The Roaring Days (1994) (aka The Henry Lawson Collection Vol. 1)
- On the Wallaby Track (1994) (aka The Henry Lawson Collection Vol. 2)

== Popular poems, short stories and sketches ==
- "Australian Loyalty" (essay, 1887)
- "United Division" (essay, 1888)
- "A Neglected History" (essay)
- "The Babies of Walloon" (poem, 1891)
- "The Grog-an'-Grumble Steeplechase" (poem, 1892)
- "Steelman's Pupil" (short story, 1895)
- "The Geological Spieler" (short story, 1896)
- "The Iron-Bark Chip" (short story, 1900)
- "Triangles of Life, and other stories" (short stories, 1916)

=== Selected list of poems ===
Title	Year	First published	Reprinted/collected in
"A Song of the Republic"	1887	The Bulletin, 1 October 1887, p5	A Camp-Fire Yarn : Henry Lawson Complete Works 1885-1900 edited by Leonard Cronin (editor), Meanjin Press, 1946, p. 17
"Flag of the Southern Cross"	1887	Truth, 1887	Henry Lawson : Collected Verse : Vol 1. 1885-1900 edited by Colin Roderick, Angus & Robertson, 1967, pp. 8–9
"Faces in the Street"	1888	The Bulletin, 28 July 1888, p17	In the Days When the World was Wide and Other Verses, Angus and Robertson, 1900, pp. 26–32
"Andy's Gone with Cattle"	1888	The Australian Town and Country Journal, 13 October 1888, p757	In the Days When the World was Wide and Other Verses, Angus and Robertson, 1900, pp. 57–58
"The Ballad of the Drover"	1889	The Australian Town and Country Journal, 9 March 1889, p30	In the Days When the World was Wide and Other Verses, Angus and Robertson, 1900, pp. 99–102
"The Teams"	1889	The Australian Town and Country Journal, 21 December 1889, p16	In the Days When the World was Wide and Other Verses, Angus and Robertson, 1900, pp. 169–171
"The Roaring Days"	1889	The Bulletin on 21 December 1889, p26	In the Days When the World was Wide and Other Verses, Angus and Robertson, 1900, pp. 33–36
"Middleton's Rouseabout"	1890	The Freeman's Journal 8 March 1890, p14	In the Days When the World was Wide and Other Verses, Angus and Robertson, 1900, pp. 97–98
"The Song of Old Joe Swallow"	1890	The Bulletin, 24 May 1890, p13	In the Days When the World was Wide and Other Verses, Angus and Robertson, 1900, pp. 127–131
"The Fire at Ross's Farm"	1890	The Bulletin, 6 December 1890, p5	Short Stories in Prose and Verse, Louisa Lawson, 1894, pp. 40–45
"Freedom on the Wallaby"	1891	The Worker (Brisbane), 16 May 1891	The Essential Henry Lawson edited by Brian Kiernan, Currey O'Neil, 1982, pp. 69–70
"Up the Country"	1892	The Bulletin, 9 July 1892, p21	In the Days When the World was Wide and Other Verses, Angus and Robertson, 1900, pp. 137–141
"The City Bushman"	1892	The Bulletin, 6 August 1892, p5	In the Days When the World was Wide and Other Verses, Angus and Robertson, 1900, pp. 147–157
"The Poets of the Tomb"	1892	The Bulletin, 8 October 1892, p20	In the Days When the World was Wide and Other Verses, Angus and Robertson, 1900, pp. 225–227
"When Your Pants Begin to Go"	1892	The Bulletin, 17 December 1892, p24	When I Was King and Other Verses, Angus and Robertson, 1905, pp. 125–129
"Saint Peter"	1893	The Bulletin, 8 April 1893, p19	Verses, Popular and Humorous, Angus and Robertson, 1900, pp. 155–157
"Out Back"	1893	The Bulletin, 30 September 1893, p19	In the Days When the World was Wide and Other Verses, Angus and Robertson, 1900, pp. 47–50
"The Vagabond"	1895	The Bulletin, 31 August 1895, p28	In the Days When the World was Wide and Other Verses, Angus and Robertson, 1900, pp. 85–89
"The Star of Australasia"	1897	The Australian Workman, 6 March 1897, p34	In the Days When the World was Wide and Other Verses, Angus and Robertson, 1900, pp. 116–123
"The Sliprails and the Spur"	1899	The Bulletin, 1 April 1899, p32	In the Days When the World was Wide and Other Verses, Angus and Robertson, 1900, pp. 72–73
"The Never-Never Country"	1899		Joe Wilson and His Mates, Angus and Robertson, 1901, pp. 331–334
"Scots of the Riverina"	1917	The Bulletin, 24 May 1917, p47	Selected Poems of Henry Lawson, Angus and Robertson, 1918, p. 106

=== Selected list of short stories ===
Title	Year	First published	Reprinted/collected in
"The Bush Undertaker"	1892	The Antipodean, 1892	Short Stories in Prose and Verse, L. Lawson, 1894, pp. 55–71
"The Drover's Wife"	1892	The Bulletin, 23 July 1892, pp. 21–22	Short Stories in Prose and Verse, L. Lawson, 1894, pp. 26–39
"The Union Buries Its Dead"	1893	Truth, 6 May 1893	Short Stories in Prose and Verse, L. Lawson, 1894, pp. 46–53
"On the Edge of a Plain"	1893	The Bulletin, 16 April 1893, p. 20	While the Billy Boils, Angus and Robertson, 1896, pp. 98–100
"Bill, the Ventriloquial Rooster"	1898	The Bulletin, 22 October 1898, p. 32	On the Track, Angus and Robertson, 1900, pp. 95–101
"The Loaded Dog"	1901		Joe Wilson and His Mates, Angus and Robertson, 1901, pp. 183–193
"A Double Buggy at Lahey's Creek"	1901	Blackwood's Magazine, February 1901	Joe Wilson and His Mates, Angus and Robertson, 1901, pp. 121–152
"A Child in the Dark, and a Foreign Father"	1902	The Bulletin, 13 December 1902, pp. 14	Triangles of Life and Other Stories, Standard Publishing, 1913, pp. 168–178

== Recurring characters ==
- Joe Wilson
  - "Brighten's Sister-in-law"
  - "A Double Buggy at Lahey Creek"
  - "Water Them Geraniums"
  - "Joe Wilson's Courtship"
- Jack Mitchell
  - "Mitchell: A Character Sketch"
  - "On the Edge of a Plain"
  - "'Some Day'"
  - "Shooting The Moon"
  - "Our Pipes"
  - "Bill, the Ventriloquial Rooster"
  - "Enter Mitchell"
  - "Mitchell Doesn't Believe in the Sack"
  - "Another of Mitchell's Plans"
- Steelman and Smith
  - "The Geological Spieler"
  - "Steelman's Pupil"
  - "An Oversight of Steelman's"
  - "How Steelman told his Story"
  - "A Gentleman Sharper and Steelman Sharper"
- Dave Regan, Jim Bently and/or Andy Page
  - "The Loaded Dog"
  - "The Iron-Bark Chip"
  - "Andy Page's Rival"
  - "The Mystery of Dave Regan"
  - "Poisonous Jimmy Gets Left"
- Brummy Hewson

== Lawson in popular culture ==
- While the Billy Boils by Beaumont Smith
- Trooper Campbell by Raymond Longford
- Taking his Chance by Raymond Longford
- Bulletin Debate
- Recording of Henry Lawson's works by actor Jack Thompson
- The Drover's Wife: The Legend of Molly Johnson: a play, novel and film by Leah Purcell
- Lawson by John Schumann
