= Colin Roderick =

Australian writer

Colin Roderick CBE
- Born: 27 July 1911; Mount Morgan, Queensland
- Died: 16 June 2000 (aged 88); Townsville, Queensland
- Education: University of Queensland

Signature
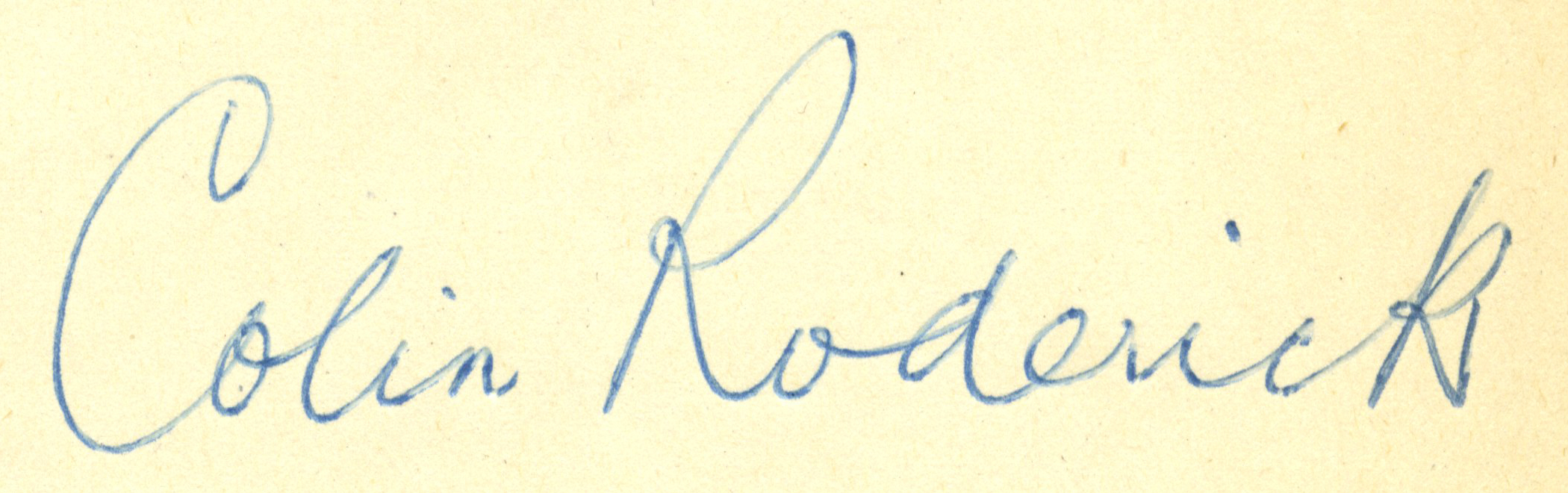

Colin Arthur Roderick CBE (27 July 1911 – 16 June 2000) was an Australian writer, editor, academic and educator.

== Early life and education ==
Colin Roderick was born in Mount Morgan, Queensland on 27 July, 1911.

He attended Bundaberg State School and then, while working as a school teacher, studied through the external studies programme at the University of Queensland, graduating in 1936 with a B.A. He later graduated from the same university with a B.Ed., an M.A., an M.Ed., and finally, in 1954, with a Ph.D. for which he wrote a thesis on Australian novelist Rosa Praed. For part of this period he belonged to the Australian Army.

== Career ==
Roderick worked as editor for the Australian publisher and bookseller Angus & Robertson from 1945 through 1965 and was the firm's director in 1961–65.

During the 1950s, he played an "instrumental" role in the setting up of a chair of Australian literature at the University of Sydney. He also helped establish the Miles Franklin Literary Award.

In 1965, he was appointed as the inaugural professor of English at the James Cook University, in Townsville, Queensland. During this period, he set up the Foundation for Australian Literary Studies (FALS). The Colin Roderick Award, founded in 1967, is named for him.

== Final years ==
After retiring, Roderick was made emeritus professor in English at James Cook University and subsequently received an honorary Litt.D. from that university and from the Université de Caen.

== Honours and awards ==
- 1966: CBE
- 1974: Gold Medal of the Australian Literature Society

== Select bibliography ==
=== As author ===
- The Lady and the Lawyer, Sydney: Angus & Robertson, 1956.
- John Knatchbull from Quarterdeck to Gallows, Sydney: Angus & Robertson, 1963.
- Miles Franklin: Her Brilliant Career, Adelaide: Rigby, 1982.
- Leichhardt: The Dauntless Explorer, North Ryde: Angus & Robertson, 1988.
- Henry Lawson: A Life, North Ryde, N.S.W.: Angus & Robertson, 1991.
- Banjo Paterson: Poet by Accident, St. Leonards, N.S.W.: Allen & Unwin, 1993.

=== As editor ===
- The Australian Novel: A Historical Anthology, Sydney, William Brooks, 1945
- 20 Australian Novelists, Sydney: Angus & Robertson, 1947.
- Australian Round-Up : Stories From 1790 to 1950, Sydney: Angus and Robertson, 1953.
- Rose Paterson’s Illalong Letters (1873-1888), East Roseville: Kangaroo Press (Simon & Schuster, Australia), 2000.

=== Henry Lawson Memorial Edition ===
- Henry Lawson: Collected Verse, Vol. I: 1885-1900, Sydney: Angus & Robertson, 1967.
- Henry Lawson: Collected Verse, Vol. II: 1901-1909, Sydney: Angus & Robertson, 1969.
- Henry Lawson: Collected Verse, Vol. III: 1910-1922, Sydney: Angus & Robertson, 1967.
- Henry Lawson: Letters, 1890-1922, Sydney, Angus & Robertson, 1970
- Henry Lawson: Collected Prose: Vol. I: Short Stories and Sketches, 1888-1922, Sydney, Angus & Robertson, 1972.
- Henry Lawson: Collected Prose: Vol. II: Autobiographical and Other Writings, 1887-1922, Sydney, Angus & Robertson, 1972.
- Henry Lawson: Collected Prose: Vol. III: Commentary, Sydney, Angus & Robertson, 1972
- Henry Lawson and His World: A Pictorial Biography (in preparation)

== Personal life ==
Roderick died in Townsville, Queensland on 16 June 2000.
