= Ian McGibbon =

New Zealand historian

Ian McGibbon ONZM
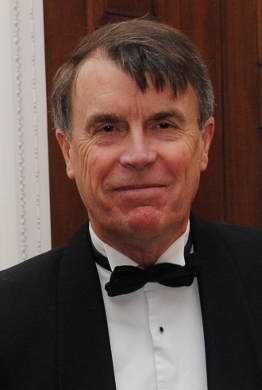
- McGibbon in 2014
- Born: Ian Callum McGibbon; 7 December 1947 (age 78); Dannevirke, New Zealand

Academic background
- Education: Victoria University of Wellington (LitD; MA)

Academic work
- Institutions: Ministry of Defence; Department of Internal Affairs; Ministry for Culture and Heritage
- Main interests: New Zealand military history

Ian Callum McGibbon ONZM (born 7 December 1947) is a New Zealand historian, specialising in military and political history of the 20th century. He has published several books on New Zealand participation in the First and Second World Wars.

== Biography ==
Born on 7 December 1947 in Dannevirke, McGibbon was educated at Victoria University of Wellington. He earned a Bachelor of Arts in 1968, Honours the following year and in 1971, he graduated with a Master of Arts degree with distinction, majoring in history.

His career as a historian began with an appointment in 1971 as the Defence Historian at the Ministry of Defence, where he worked for eight years. In 1979, he started work for the Department of Internal Affairs in the Historical Publications Branch. From 1982, he was the only staff member dealing with military history and produced the official history of New Zealand's involvement in the Korean War. In 1994 he earned a Doctor of Letters, also from Victoria University. He later was General Editor (War History) at the Ministry for Culture and Heritage. His primary areas of interest are New Zealand's diplomatic and military history, with particular focus on New Zealand's involvement in 20th-century warfare.

In the 1997 Queen's Birthday Honours, McGibbon was appointed an Officer of the New Zealand Order of Merit, for services to historical research. From 2010 to 2014, McGibbon was New Zealand's representative in the tri-nation Joint Historical and Archaeological Survey of the Anzac Battlefield, working alongside historians and archaeologists from Australia and Turkey; he was a co-editor of Anzac Battlefield: A Gallipoli Landscape of War and Memory, the resulting publication from the Cambridge University Press.

Since 1981 he has been managing editor of the New Zealand Institute of International Affairs' journal New Zealand International Review.

== Publications ==
McGibbon's publications include:

Author

- Blue-Water Rationale: The Naval Defence of New Zealand 1914–1942 (1981)
- The Path To Gallipoli, Defending New Zealand 1840–1915 (1991)
- New Zealand and the Korean War

Volume I: Politics and Diplomacy (1992)
Volume II: Combat Operations (1996)

- The Western Front: A Guide to New Zealand Battlefields and Memorials (2001, revised edition 2015)
- Gallipoli: A Guide to New Zealand Battlefields and Memorials (2005, revised edition 2014)
- Kiwi Sappers: The Corps of Royal New Zealand Engineers' Century of Service (2002)
- A History of the Mangatoro Station and the Waitahora Valley (2006)
- New Zealand and the Second World War: The People, the Battles and the Legacy (2004)
- New Zealand's Vietnam War: A History of Combat, Commitment and Controversy (2011)
- New Zealand's Western Front Campaign (2016)

Editor

- Undiplomatic Dialogue: Letters Between Carl Berendsen and Alister McIntosh, 1943–52 (1994)
- Unofficial Channels: Letters between Alister Mcintosh and Foss Shanahan, George Laking and Frank Corner 1946–1966 (1999)
- Oxford Companion To New Zealand Military History (2000)
- One Flag, One Queen, One Tongue: New Zealand and the South African War (2003)
- New Zealand's Great War: New Zealand, the Allies and the First World War (2007)
- The Penguin Book of New Zealanders at War (2009)
- Seeing Red, New Zealand, the Commonwealth and the Cold War, 1945–91 (2012)
- ANZAC Battlefield: A Gallipoli Landscape of War and Memory (2016)
- Tutu te Puehu, New Perspectives on the New Zealand Wars (2018)
- New Zealand’s Foreign Service: A History (2022)
