= Jim Bellwood =

New Zealand labourer and physical education instructor (1912–1994)

James Charles Bellwood MBE (10 July 1912 – 19 July 1994) was a New Zealand labourer, physical education instructor and sports coach.

He was born in Hastings, New Zealand, as James Charles Robertson, but was fostered by Arthur and Ada Bellwood in Christchurch. He was an athletics trainer and his most famous protégée was Yvette Williams.

In the 1984 Queen's Birthday Honours, Bellwood was appointed a Member of the Order of the British Empire, for services to athletics.
