= Official History of New Zealand in the Second World War 1939–45 =

New Zealand 48-volume history series

- Author: Howard Kippenberger (Editor-in-Chief 1945–1957); Monty C. Fairbrother (Editor-in-Chief 1957–1963); Numerous principal authors
- Language: English
- Subject: Military history of New Zealand in World War II
- Genre: Military history
- Publisher: War History Branch, Department of Internal Affairs
- Publication date: 1949–1986
- Publication place: New Zealand
- Preceded by: Official History of New Zealand's Effort in the Great War
- Followed by: New Zealand and the Korean War

The Official History of New Zealand in the Second World War 1939–45 is a 48-volume series published by the War History Branch (and its successors) of the Department of Internal Affairs which covered New Zealand involvement in the Second World War. The series was published during the period 1949 to 1986. A collection of booklets entitled Episodes and Studies were also published between 1948 and 1954. The Official History of New Zealand in the Second World War 1939–45 was the largest publication project undertaken in New Zealand.

== Background ==
It had long been felt in New Zealand that the four-volume 'popular' history of the New Zealand Expeditionary Force, the Official History of New Zealand's Effort in the Great War which had been published a few years after the First World War ended, had not matched the standard set by the Official History of Australia in the War of 1914–1918, edited by Charles Bean. In 1940, with a view to the production of an official history of New Zealand's contributions to the Second World War, an archivist was appointed to the headquarters of the 2nd New Zealand Expeditionary Force (2NZEF) to ensure the preservation of important documentation and records. He was joined by Eric McCormick, a published literary and art historian, in 1941. After he became aware of the progress made on the Australian official history, McCormick pushed for progress on New Zealand's own efforts in this regard. By 1944, the New Zealand government had decided to appoint an official historian who would be editor-in-chief of an official history which would cover the military contribution to the war effort and the efforts of the New Zealand people.

McCormick was recalled to New Zealand from 2NZEF headquarters and appointed Official War Archivist. He set about collecting and cataloging documents necessary for the official history. To produce the official history, an appropriate organisation was required and accordingly the War History Branch (later to become the Historical Publications Branch) of the Department of Internal Affairs was established in 1945. McCormick would run the War History Branch until an Editor-in-Chief was appointed. To lead the War History Branch, Major General Howard Kippenberger was approached in April 1945. A former commander of the 2nd New Zealand Division, he had been identified the previous year by New Zealand's prime minister, Peter Fraser, as being the ideal candidate for the position. Kippenberger, a keen student of military history, was working in England on the repatriation of former prisoners of war to New Zealand when the position was first offered. Although he accepted the offer, he did not return to New Zealand to start work on his new role until mid-1946.

== Preparation of the series ==
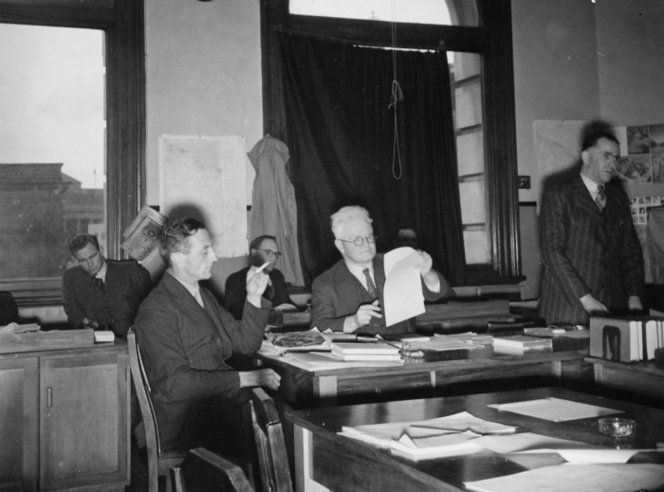
A conference at the War History Branch in relation to the 2NZEF unit histories. Attendees include Chief Archivist Eric McCormick (left foreground, with cigarette) and the Editor-in-Chief Major-General Howard Kippenberger (speaking, at right) 5 July 1946

The principle of the official histories was to tell the story of New Zealand at war, which involved a multifaceted approach covering the armed services, the battles in which they fought as well as the civilians contributing on the home front. The plan for the official histories, based on a proposal by McCormick, was to encompass three main series, plus three volumes of documents. The series was on the New Zealand People at War, which covered politics, diplomacy, economy, the home front, medical, navy and air force operations. The second was a series of histories for the units of the 2NZEF that fought in the African and Italian theatres (the units that fought in the Pacific were already the subject of unofficial unit histories, commissioned by the commanding officer of the 3rd New Zealand Division, Harold Barrowclough). The third was a series of campaign histories, covering the main campaigns of the 2NZEF. A series of booklets, entitled Episodes and Studies aimed at general readers was also planned.

Using documentation archived to date and material solicited from the public, professional historians at the War History Branch prepared brief narratives. There was also cooperation with war historians of other countries working on their official histories. Authors were then contracted to produce each volume based on the narratives prepared by the War History Branch. Many of the authors had recently served with the 2NZEF and included a former commanding officer of Kippenberger, Sir Edward Puttick, as well as William George Stevens, administrative officer of the 2NZEF. Other potential authors were journalists, such as Stephen Peter Llewellyn, or academics. Kippenberger had informally started the recruitment process for writers while he was based in England, sounding out Dan Davin and Geoffrey Cox as potential authors. Davin produced the campaign volume on the Battle of Crete and Cox started work on an account of the Libyan Campaign but had to later drop it to pursue his career. Staff were poorly paid, with many going several years without a salary increase.

Kippenberger set a high standard for the official histories; as well as disavowing any censorship, he diligently read every draft of every volume produced under his editorship, providing extensive feedback to the authors. Despite stressing the need for objectivity, he struggled with his own views on battles in which he had been involved. The volume on the Battle of Crete proved to be particularly difficult to produce and he struggled with the critical analysis of the leadership of some of his friends during the battle. Leslie Andrew, former commander of the 22nd Battalion, was one who took offence at the account of his handling of the unit during the fighting on Crete. The official histories had on occasion been threatened with political interference, particularly after a change in government in 1949. Kippenberger, a person of high standing with the government and the ordinary New Zealander, was a strong advocate for the project and convinced the new government of the merits of the official histories. Other problems arose when authors were unable to complete their contracted volumes due to other commitments, poor health or one case, death. It was often necessary for the War History Branch staff to step in and complete the outstanding work.

When Kippenberger died in 1957, his position as editor in chief was taken over by Monty Fairbrother, who had been associate editor of the War History Branch. By 1963, staff numbers at the War History Branch had fallen to seven, from its peak of fifty in 1946. The branch was soon renamed the Historical Publications Branch. Public and governmental interest in the project faded after Kippenberger's death. Although most volumes had been published by 1960, it was not until 1986 that the final two volumes as originally planned, relating to the Home Front in New Zealand, were published. With its 48 volumes and 24 booklets, the Official History of New Zealand in the Second World War 1939–45 was the largest publishing project ever undertaken in New Zealand.

== Volumes ==
=== Unit histories of 2NZEF ===
- 18 Battalion and Armoured Regiment - W. D. Dawson (1961)
- 19 Battalion and Armoured Regiment - D. W. Sinclair (1954)
- 20 Battalion and Armoured Regiment - W. A. Glue; D. J. C. Pringle (1957)
- 21 Battalion - J. F. Cody (1953)
- 22 Battalion - J. Henderson (1958)
- 23 Battalion - A. Ross (1959)
- 24 Battalion - R. M. Burdon (1954)
- 25 Battalion - E. Puttick (1960)
- 26 Battalion - F. D. Norton (1952)
- 27 (Machine Gun) Battalion - R. L. Kay (1958)
- 28 (Maori) Battalion - J. F. Cody (1956)
- 4th and 6th Reserve Mechanical Transport Companies - J. Henderson (1954)
- Journey Towards Christmas: History of the 1st Ammunition Company, Second New Zealand Expeditionary Force, 1939–45 - S. P. Llewellyn (1949)
- Supply Company - P. W. Bates (1955)
- Petrol Company - A. Kidson (1961)
- 2nd New Zealand Divisional Artillery - W. E. Murphy (1966)
- Divisional Cavalry - R. J. M. Loughnan (1963)
- Divisional Signals - C. A. Borman (1954)
- New Zealand Engineers, Middle East - J. F. Cody (1961)
- Medical Units of 2 NZEF in Middle East and Italy - J. B. McKinney (1952)

The size of New Zealand's military contribution was such that it favoured the production of battalion and in some cases, company level unit histories. By 1946, some units had already begun work on unofficial histories. When Kippenberger became Editor-in-Chief, he met with all the senior former commanding officers of each unit to ensure a co-ordinated approach to each unit history. Each serving member of a unit, or the next of kin of a member who had died in service with the unit, received a copy of the official history of the unit.

=== Campaign histories ===
- To Greece - W. G. McClymont (1959)
- Crete - D. M. Davin (1953)
- The Relief of Tobruk - W. E. Murphy (1961)
- Battle for Egypt - J. L. Scoullar (1955)
- Alam Halfa and Alamein - R. Walker (1967)
- Bardia to Enfidaville - W. G. Stevens (1962)
- Italy Volume I: The Sangro to Cassino - N. Phillips (1957)
- Italy Volume II: From Cassino to Trieste - R. L. Kay (1967)
- The Pacific - O. Gillespie (1952)

=== The New Zealand People at War ===
- Political and External Affairs - F. L. W. Wood (1958)
- War Economy - J. V. T. Baker (1965)
- The Home Front: Volume I - Nancy Margaret Taylor (1986)
- The Home Front: Volume II - Nancy Margaret Taylor (1986)
- Chaplains - Sydney D. Waters; John Ross; Rev. Michael L. Underhill; N. E. Winhall (1950)
- Prisoners of War - W. Wynne Mason (1954)
- War Surgery and Medicine - T. Duncan M. Stout (1954)
- New Zealand Medical Services in Middle East and Italy - T. Duncan M. Stout (1956)
- Medical Services in New Zealand and The Pacific - T. Duncan M. Stout (1958)
- The New Zealand Dental Services - T. V. Anson (1960)
- New Zealanders with the Royal Air Force: Volume I - H. L. Thompson (1953)
- New Zealanders with the Royal Air Force: Volume II - H. L. Thompson (1956)
- New Zealanders with the Royal Air Force:Volume III - H. L. Thompson (1959)
- Royal New Zealand Air Force - John Ross (1955)
- The Royal New Zealand Navy - S. D. Waters (1956)
- Problems of 2 NZEF - W. G. Stevens (1958)

=== Documents ===
- Documents Relating to New Zealand's Participation in the Second World War 1939–45: Volume I (1949)
- Documents Relating to New Zealand's Participation in the Second World War 1939–45: Volume II (1951)
- Documents Relating to New Zealand's Participation in the Second World War 1939–45: Volume III (1963)

=== Episodes and studies ===
- Guns Against Tanks : L Troop, 33rd Battery, 7th New Zealand Anti-Tank Regiment in Libya, 23 November 1941 - E. H. Smith (1948)
- Achilles at the River Plate - S. D. Waters (1948)
- Women at War - D. O. W. Hall (1948)
- The Assault on Rabaul : Operations by the Royal New Zealand Air Force December 1943 – May 1944 - J. M. S. Ross (1949)
- Long Range Desert Group in Libya, 1940–41 - by R. L. Kay (1949)
- Prisoners of Japan - D. O. W. Hall (1949)
- Troopships - S. P. Llewellyn (1949)
- Prisoners of Germany - D. O. W. Hall (1949)
- Prisoners of Italy - D. O. W. Hall (1949)
- German Raiders in the Pacific - S. D. Waters (1949)
- Wounded in Battle - J. B. McKinney (1950)
- Long Range Desert Group in the Mediterranean - R. L. Kay (1950)
- Aircraft against U-Boat - H. L. Thompson (1950)
- Early Operations with Bomber Command - B. G. Clare (1951)
- New Zealanders in the Battle of Britain - N. W. Faircloth (1951)
- Leander - S. D. Waters (1951)
- Malta Airmen - J. A. Whelan (1951)
- Takrouna - I. McL. Wards (1951)
- Coastwatchers - D. O. W. Hall (1951)
- The Royal New Zealand Air Force in South-East Asia 1941–42 - H. R. Dean (1952)
- "The Other Side of the Hill" - I. McL. Wards; W. E. Murphy; R. Walker; R. L. Kay; A. G. Potheroe (1952)
- Special Service in Greece - M. B. McGlynn (1953)
- Point 175: The Battle of Sunday of the Dead - W. E. Murphy (1954)
- Escapes - D. O. W. Hall (1954)

"Episodes and studies" was a series of 36 page booklets with a focus on certain aspects of the New Zealand war effort. The booklets were intended for the wider public and were often provided to secondary schools.

== Reception ==
The series was well received by the public and each volume usually sold out. Dan Davin's Crete had a print run of 4,000 when published in 1953 and promptly sold out. Some volumes received critical praise; Journey Towards Christmas, one of the earliest volumes published, was particularly singled out for its narrative style. Its author, journalist Peter Llewellyn, was contracted to produce another volume but slow progress resulted in the cancellation of his contract; other volumes were thought to be turgid and stilted. Since 1993, some volumes have been reissued by Willson Scott Publishing and The Battery Press, with the co-operation of the Department of Internal Affairs.
