= Amelia Batistich =

New Zealand fiction writer

Amelia Batistich QSM
- Born: Amelia Barbarich; 11 March 1915; Dargaville, New Zealand
- Died: 21 August 2004 (aged 89); New Zealand
- Occupation: Fiction writer

Amelia Batistich QSM (née Barbarich; 11 March 1915 – 21 August 2004) was a New Zealand fiction writer of Croatian descent.

== Life ==
Batistich was born in Dargaville to John Barbarich and Milka Matutinovich, settlers from Dalmatia. Her parents ran a boarding house which attracted new migrants, including labourers heading for Northland's gumfields for work. She was educated by the Sisters of St Joseph and the Sisters of Our Lady of the Missions.

The family moved to Auckland when Batistich was 11. Her father worked at a quarry there with Dalmatian stonemasons, and she was thus again surrounded by Dalmatian people.

In the 1940s, aged about 44, she began to write poems and stories about her family and community, and the hardships faced by early settlers. These were initially published in The Listener magazine and the New Zealand School Journal, a magazine for New Zealand school children. She also wrote about other ethnic minorities in New Zealand, such as Chinese in the Otago gold rush.

In 1981, Batistich's novel Pjevaj Vilo u Planini won first prize in an international competition in the former Yugoslavia for migrant writers, and she was invited to visit Croatia by the Croatian Writers' Guild.

In the 1997 Queen's Birthday Honours, Batistich was awarded the Queen's Service Medal for community service. She has been credited with leading the way for other ethnic groups, such as Māori, to also express their outlook on the community they were living in.

== Publications ==
=== Collections of short stories ===
- An Olive Tree in Dalmatia 1963; reprinted 1980
- Holy Terrors and Other Stories 1991

=== Novels ===
- Another Mountain, Another Song 1981
- Pjevaj Vilo u Planini 1981, in Serbo-Croatian; translated into English as Sing Vila in the Mountains 1987
- Never Lost for Words 2001

=== Memoirs ===
- My Story 2003
