= Maida Bryant =

Maida Bryant MBE JP
- Born: Maida Elizabeth Claire Ferguson; 12 December 1926; Coalgate, New Zealand
- Died: 4 April 2016 (aged 89); Hokitika, New Zealand
- Occupation: Nurse
- Known for: Community leader
- Spouse: Allen Lindsay Bryant (m. 1952; died 1993)
- Children: 4

Maida Elizabeth Claire Bryant (née Ferguson; 12 December 1926 – 4 April 2016) was a New Zealand nurse, local politician, and community leader.

== Biography ==
Born in Coalgate on 12 December 1926, Bryant was educated at Christchurch Girls' High School, and went on to study at the Christchurch School of Nursing between 1945 and 1948. In 1952, she married Allen Lindsay Bryant, and the couple went on to have four children.

Bryant worked as a practice nurse, and served four terms as president of the Westland branch of the New Zealand Nurses' Association. Active in community groups, particularly women's organisations, she served as president of both the Westland branch of the National Council of Women and Soroptimist International of Westland, and was the inaugural president of the Inner Wheel Club of Hokitika. She also served on the executive of the West Coast branch of the Women's Division of Federated Farmers.

Active in local politics, Bryant served as a Hokitika borough councillor, a member of the Westland Hospital Board, a member of the West Coast National Parks and Reserves Board, and was chair of the West Coast Walkways Committee. She was also a referee on the West Coast Disputes Tribunal, and was appointed a justice of the peace in 1976.

Bryant died in Hokitika on 4 April 2016, having been predeceased by her husband. Her ashes were buried in Hokitika Cemetery.

== Honours and awards ==
In 1971, Bryant was named Rotary woman of the year, and in 1975 she was the West Coast woman of the year. In the 1984 Queen's Birthday Honours, she was appointed a Member of the Order of the British Empire, for services to the community. In 1990, Bryant was awarded the New Zealand 1990 Commemoration Medal. She received the National Council of Women's national distinguished service award, recognising her contributions and commitment to the West Coast branch, in 1998.

In the 1978 New Year Honours, Allen Bryant was awarded the Queen's Service Medal for public services.
