= Roy Williams (decathlete) =

New Zealand decathlete

Roy Williams MNZM
Personal information
- Born: 9 September 1934 (age 91)
- Relative(s): Yvette Williams (sister); Buddy Corlett (brother-in-law)

Sport
- Sport: Track and field
- Event: Decathlon

Achievements and titles
- National finals: Decathlon champion (1956, 1957, 1958, 1959, 1960, 1961, 1965, 1966, 1967, 1969, 1970); 120 yds hurdles champion (1965); Long jump champion (1958); Discus champion (1956)
Medal record
Men's Athletics
Representing New Zealand
Commonwealth Games
Gold medal – first place	1966 Kingston	Decathlon

Roy Alfred Williams MNZM (born 9 September 1934) is a former track and field athlete from New Zealand, who won gold in the decathlon at the 1966 Empire and Commonwealth Games in Kingston, but was overlooked for the 1956, 1960 and 1964 Olympic Games (in 1964 he was in training in California, and was not seen by the selectors).

He also competed in the 1958 British Empire and Commonwealth Games at Cardiff in the long jump and triple jump, and in the 1970 British Commonwealth Games at Edinburgh in the decathlon.

He won the national decathlon title 11 times between 1956 and 1970, as well as the 120 yards hurdles title in 1965, the long jump title in 1958 and the discus title in 1956. Williams finished second behind Zlatko Sumich in the decathlon event at the British 1963 AAA Championships.

He is a (younger) brother of Yvette Williams.

He was inducted into the New Zealand Sports Hall of Fame in 1990. In the 2002 New Year Honours, Williams was appointed a Member of the New Zealand Order of Merit, for services to athletics.
