= New Zealand and the Korean War =

- Covers for the two books in the series
- Author: Ian McGibbon
- Language: English
- Subject: Military history of New Zealand during the Korean War
- Genre: Military history
- Publisher: Oxford University Press
- Publication date: 1992 (Volume 1); 1996 (Volume 2)
- Publication place: New Zealand
- Preceded by: Official History of New Zealand in the Second World War 1939–45
- Followed by: New Zealand’s Vietnam War: A History of Combat, Commitment and Controversy

New Zealand and the Korean War is the official history of New Zealand's role in the Korean War. The series consists of two volumes; the first, published in 1992, dealt with New Zealand's strategy and diplomacy in the war while the second, published four years later, covered New Zealand military's combat operations during the conflict. Both volumes were written by Ian McGibbon.

== Development and publication ==
New Zealand expended considerable effort in producing its official history of the Second World War, the last volume of which was published in 1986. This delayed efforts to record the country's contributions to the postwar conflicts in which it was involved, such as the Korean War, which lasted from 1950 to 1953. Despite this, there had been an intention to produce an official history of New Zealand's role in the Korean War since the 1950s. Ian McGibbon, responsible for military history at the Historical Publications Branch of the Department of Internal Affairs, started his work in 1979, but conceded that other duties delayed the publication of the first volume.

The first volume of the series, titled Politics & Diplomacy, was published in 1992 with a print run of 500 copies. It provided a detailed account of New Zealand's foreign and defence policies leading to the decision to commit Kayforce to Korea and how the conflict affected domestic affairs. The series' second volume, entitled Combat Operations, was published in 1996, and dealt with New Zealand's military contributions to the Korean War, which began first with frigates of the Royal New Zealand Navy being dispatched to Korean waters. The ships were later followed by Kayforce, composed of ground forces which remained in Korea until 1957.

== Reception ==
New Zealand and the Korean War was generally well received by critics. When it was released, W. David McIntyre described Politics & Diplomacy as being "the best book written so far on New Zealand's external affairs". In reviewing the second volume of the series for the Journal of Military History, Jeffrey Grey stated that it "matched the high standard" established by McGibbon's first volume.

== See also ==
- Australia in the Korean War 1950–53
