= Jim Henderson (writer) =

New Zealand writer, historian and broadcaster

Jim Henderson MBE
- Born: James Herbert Henderson; 26 August 1918; Motueka, New Zealand
- Died: 11 July 2005 (aged 86); New Zealand
- Resting place: Motueka Cemetery, Motueka, New Zealand
- Writing career
- Subjects: Military history Rural New Zealand

James Herbert Henderson MBE (26 August 1918 – 11 July 2005) was a New Zealand writer, historian and broadcaster. A soldier in the Second World War, he wrote two volumes of the Official History of New Zealand in the Second World War 1939–45, as well as a number of other books. He also conceived and presented a long-running radio programme, Open Country, and wrote several related books. He was appointed a Member of the Order of the British Empire in the 1984 Queen's Birthday Honours, for services to literature and broadcasting.

== Early life ==
Born in Motueka in New Zealand on 26 August 1918, James Herbert Henderson, who became known as 'Jim', was part of a farming family that ran sheep on nearby Tākaka Hill. Educated at Nelson College, Henderson subsequently became a reporter for the Nelson Evening Mail. He later worked for the NZ Free Lance newspaper.

== Second World War ==
On the outbreak of the Second World War, Henderson joined the 2nd New Zealand Expeditionary Force (2NZEF). He served as a gunner with the divisional artillery, fighting in the North African campaign. He was wounded at Sidi Rezegh on 1 December 1941. With the rest of his gun crew killed, he was not found until three days later by the Germans, becoming a prisoner of war. Due to the severity of his wounds, his left leg was amputated. Held in captivity in Italy, he remained there until July 1943, when he was repatriated in exchange for the return of wounded Italian prisoners of war.

Henderson wrote a book of his experiences during the war, partly to help in deal with the resulting mental trauma, and this was published in 1946 as Gunner Inglorious. Well received, it has been the subject of several reprints with over 100,000 copies sold. He sold the film rights in 1979. In 2004, it was adapted into a play and performed by Michael Burton in Auckland.

== Later life ==
Henderson was commissioned to write a volume of the Official History of New Zealand in the Second World War 1939–45, a series of publications stewarded by Major General Howard Kippenberger, formerly a senior officer in the 2NZEF, that would cover the military contribution to the war effort and the efforts of the New Zealand people. Henderson's work was a history of the two companies of the Reserve Mechanical Transport that served with the 2NZEF and was published in 1954. He was then contracted to produce a second volume, this being a history of the 22nd Battalion. This was published in 1958.

By 1961, Henderson was working in broadcast radio. He established and presented Open Country, a regular radio programme in which depictions of rural and farming life were aired on National Radio. A popular series, it spawned several books of the same name, the first of which being published in 1965, with Return to Open Country following in 1967, Open Country Calling in 1969 and Our Open Country in 1971. The radio programme ran for 14 years before being cancelled, partly due to the advent of Country Calendar, a television show with similar themes to Henderson's programme. Nonetheless Open Country had a devoted following, and complaints after its cancellation were made to New Zealand's prime minister at the time. The same year Henderson's radio programme was cancelled, the last of his related books, Open Country Muster, was published by Reed Publishers. The company had previously published Henderson's New Zealand's South Island in Colour, illustrated with photographs by Jean and Kenneth Bigwood, in 1966.

Henderson continued to write, including contributing regular columns for RSA Review, the newsletter of the Returned Servicemen's Association, for a number of years. These were collated into a book for publication in 1978 as Soldier Country. In June 1984, he was appointed a Member of the Order of the British Empire in the Queen's Birthday Honours, for services to literature and broadcasting.

Henderson died on 11 July 2005, survived by his children. His wife Jill predeceased him. He is buried at Motueka Cemetery in Motueka.

== Publications ==
A select list of publications by Henderson:

- Gunner Inglorious (1946)
- RMT: Official History of the 4th and 6th Reserve Mechanical Transport Companies (1954)
- 22 Battalion (1958)
- Open Country (1965)
- New Zealand's South Island in Colour (1966)
- Return to Open Country (1967)
- Open Country Calling (1969)
- Our Open Country (1971)
- Open Country Muster (1974)
- Swagger Country (1976)
- Soldier Country (1978)
