= Rod Weir =

New Zealand businessman (1927-2021)

Sir Rod Weir JP
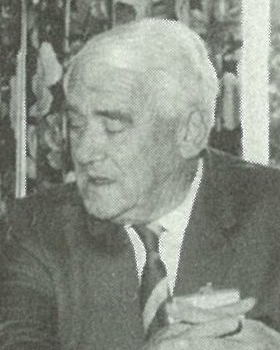
- Weir in 1988
- Born: Roderick Bignell Weir; 14 July 1927; Palmerston North, New Zealand
- Died: 15 November 2021 (aged 94); Waikanae, New Zealand
- Education: Wanganui Boys' College
- Occupation: Businessperson
- Years active: 1943–1985
- Spouses: Loys Agnes Wilson (m. 1952; died 1984) Anna Jane Peacock (m. 1986)
- Relatives: Gillian Weir (sister)

Sir Roderick Bignell Weir JP (14 July 1927 – 15 November 2021) was a New Zealand businessman.

== Early life and family ==
Weir was born in Palmerston North on 14 July 1927, the son of Clarice Mildred (née Bignell) and Cecil Alexander Weir. His younger sister is the organist Dame Gillian Weir, and his brother (1929–2016) was the bookseller and businessman Graham Ashley Weir. He received his schooling at Wanganui Boys' College, now known as Whanganui City College.

In 1952, Weir married Loys Agnes Wilson, and the couple had one child. After his wife's death in 1984, Weir married again in 1986, to Anna Jane Peacock, who as Anna MacFarlane had contested the Heretaunga electorate for the National Party at the 1984 general election, finishing in second place.

== Business career ==
Weir worked for the New Zealand Loan and Mercantile Agency Company from 1943 to 1963, which in 1961 had become Dalgety & New Zealand Loan Ltd. In 1963, he set up his own stock and station agency branded as Rod Weir & Co. After the merger with other agencies, Crown Corp was formed and eventually, the company purchased the New Zealand interests of Dalgety NZ Ltd. Weir retired from this company as chief executive in 1985. He merged his business with Wrightson NMA in 1986.

Weir has held a number of appointments. He was a consultant, appointed by the government, on the NZ Apple and Pear Marketing Board. He was chairman of the ASEAN/NZ Business Council, of Amuri Corporation Ltd, of McKechnie Pacific Ltd, and of Sherwood Mercantile Ltd. He was deputy chairman of Rangitira Ltd. He was the director of Sun Alliance Insurance Ltd, Sun Life Assurance Company Ltd, NZ Casing Company Ltd, Bain Clarkson Ltd, Crown Meats Ltd, and a number of other companies.

== Other interests ==
Weir was a member of The Salvation Army Advisory Board. He was on the council of the Wellington Medical Research Foundation. He was a board member of the Massey University Agricultural Research Foundation. He chaired the Massey University Business and Property Trust. He was a trustee of the New Zealand Institute of Economic Research, Medic Alert, and Wanganui Boys' College. He held appointments for committees of the National Party.

Weir was appointed a justice of the peace in 1972.He served as the honorary consul general for Austria from 1976 to 1984.

Weir died in Waikanae on 15 November 2021, aged 94.

== Honours ==
Weir was appointed a Knight Bachelor, for services to farming, commerce, and the community, in the 1984 Queen's Birthday Honours. He was conferred with an honorary Doctor of Science degree by Massey University in 1993. In 2008, he was inducted into the New Zealand Business Hall of Fame for "stock and station leadership"; he was the 100th laureate.
