= Ivan Lichter =

New Zealand surgeon and palliative care specialist (1918–2009)

Ivan Lichter ONZ FRCS
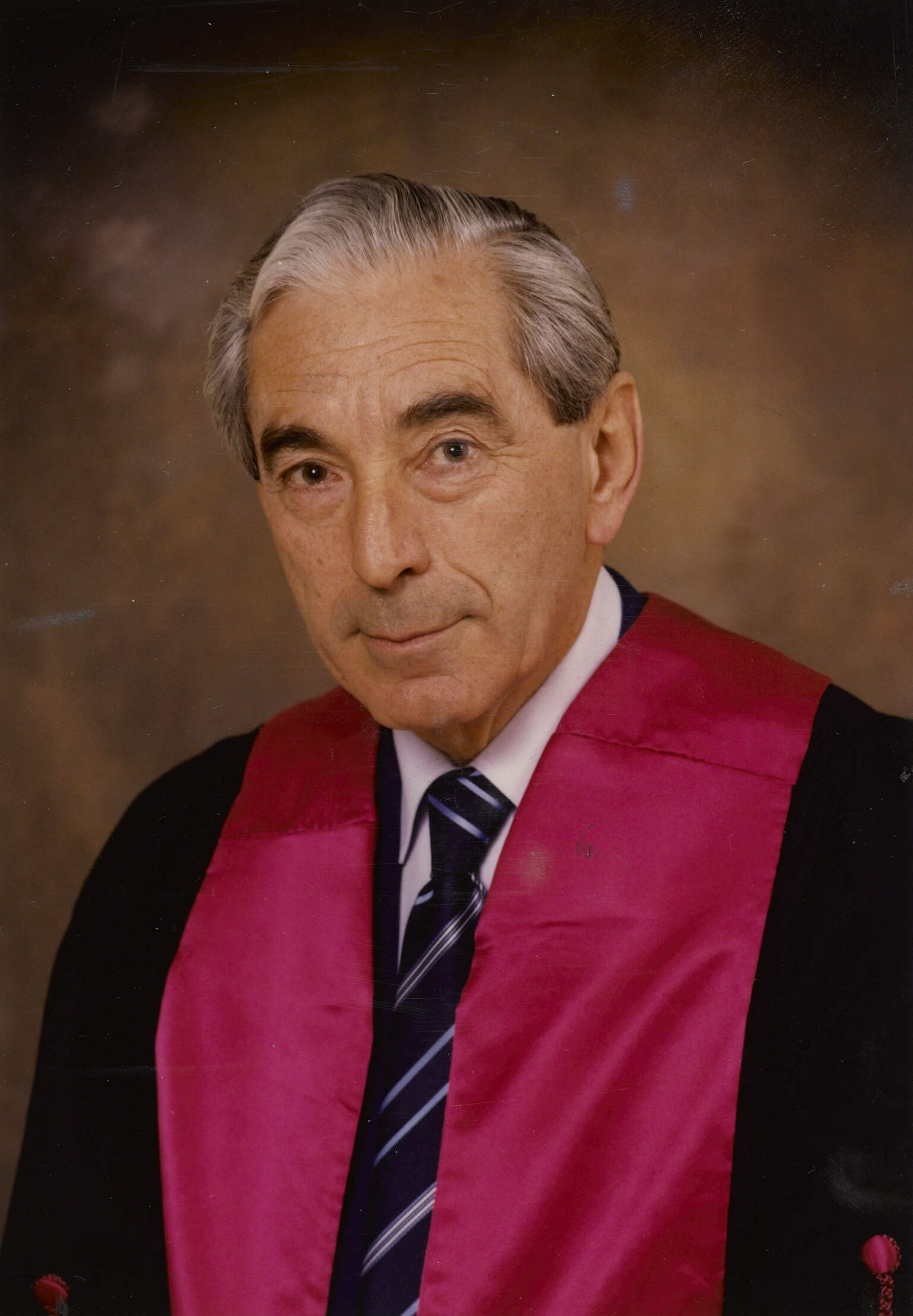
- Lichter in 1981
- Born: 14 March 1918; Oudtshoorn, Cape Province, South Africa
- Died: 12 June 2009 (aged 91); Auckland, New Zealand
- Education: University of the Witwatersrand
- Occupations: Thoracic surgeon; palliative care specialist
- Employer: University of Otago
- Known for: Pioneer of hospice care in New Zealand
- Spouse: Heather Lloyd (m. 1951)
- Children: 4

Ivan Lichter ONZ FRCS (14 March 1918 – 12 June 2009) was a thoracic surgeon and a pioneer in the field of palliative care in New Zealand. He was appointed to the Order of New Zealand, the country's highest honour and limited to 20 living people, in the 1997 Queen's Birthday Honours.

== Early life ==
Lichter was born in Oudtshoorn, Cape Province, South Africa, on 14 March 1918. He received his secondary education from Grey High School in Port Elizabeth. He graduated from the University of the Witwatersrand in Johannesburg in 1940, and served with the South African Medical Corps during World War II. After the war, he specialised in thoracic surgery and had his own medical practice.

In 1951, Lichter married Heather Lloyd and they were to have four children, three of whom also went into the medical profession. He wanted to leave South Africa to escape its politics, as the Afrikaans National Party started giving positions in hospitals to their supporters, and its antisemitism. He had the choice between a place in Texas and a place in New Zealand that he thought was called "Dune Din"; he settled on the latter and came to Dunedin (/dʌˈniːdɪn/) with his family. Lichter became a naturalised New Zealand citizen in 1964.

== Life in New Zealand ==
Lichter was an assistant lecturer at the University of Otago and at the same time was a surgeon for the Otago Hospital Board. From 1974, he was interested in palliative care. He retired from medical practice in 1984 and used the time to write Communication in Cancer Care, his most notable book.

Lichter moved to Wellington in 1986 and took up a medical directorship at Te Omanga Hospice. He retained his directorship until 1993 and was an honorary consultant afterwards.

Among the organisation that Lichter belonged to were:

- Advisory Board of Palliative Medicine
- International Advisory Committee to the International Congress on the Care of the Terminally Ill
- Executive of the Australian and New Zealand Society of Palliative Medicine, of which he was a founding member.

== Death ==
Lichter died in Auckland on 12 June 2009, at the age of 91. His wife, Heather Lichter, died the following year.
