= 1984 Birthday Honours (New Zealand) =

Awards list for New Zealand

The 1984 Queen's Birthday Honours in New Zealand, celebrating the official birthday of Elizabeth II, were appointments made by the Queen in her right as Queen of New Zealand, on the advice of the New Zealand government, to various orders and honours to reward and highlight good works by New Zealanders. They were announced on 16 June 1984.

The recipients of honours are displayed here as they were styled before their new honour.

== Knight Bachelor ==
- Cecil Lancelot Stewart Cross CBE – of Wellington. For services to sport.
- Lawrence Herbert Govan – of Christchurch. For services to manufacturing and the community.
- Roderick Bignell Weir JP – of Wellington. For services to farming, commerce and the community.
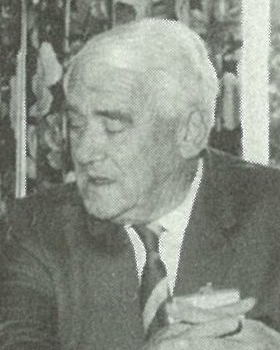
Sir Rod Weir

== Order of the Bath ==
=== Companion (CB) ===
Military division

- Rear Admiral Cedric John Steward – Royal New Zealand Navy.

== Order of Saint Michael and Saint George ==
=== Knight Commander (KCMG) ===
- The Right Honourable Lancelot Raymond Adams-Schneider – of Washington, D.C., United States. For public services, lately as New Zealand ambassador to the United States of America.
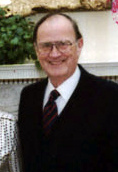
Sir Lance Adams-Schneider

=== Companion (CMG) ===
- Charles James Freeman – of Auckland. For public and community services.
- Arthur John Healy – of Wellington; Secretary for Transport.
- David Hamilton Tudhope DFC – of Wellington. For services to the development of energy resources.

== Order of the British Empire ==
=== Knight Commander (KBE) ===
Civil division

- The Right Reverend Edward Kinsella Norman DSO MC – of Wellington; Anglican Bishop of Wellington since 1973.

=== Commander (CBE) ===
Civil division

- Hugh Reginald Atkinson – of Christchurch; lately director, National Radiation Laboratory, Department of Health, Christchurch.
- Dr Carolyn Waugh Burns (Mrs Hubbard) – of Dunedin. For services to conservation.
- Thomas Stuart Dickson Hayton JP – of New Plymouth. For services to Taranaki Harbour Board and the community.
- Rangimārie Tūheka Hetet MBE – of Te Kūiti. For services to traditional Māori arts and crafts.
- Dr Malcolm John Nicolson – of Wellington. For services to the Wellington Hospital Board and the community.
- Hugh Lancelot Marshall Peirse – of Lower Hutt. For services to the wool industry and the community.

Military division

- Brigadier Thomas Geoffrey Leighs ED ADC – Brigadiers' List, New Zealand Army (Territorial Force).
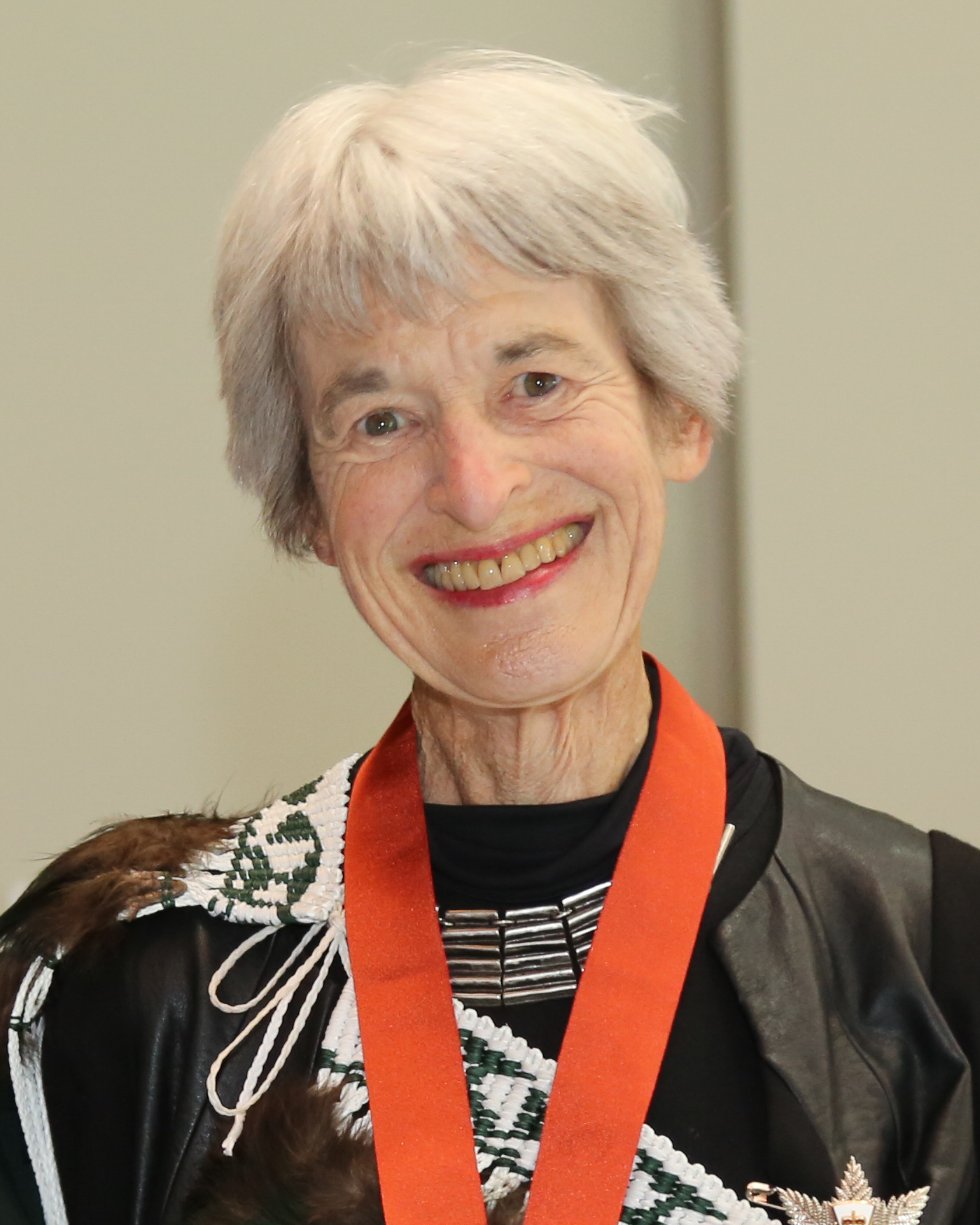
Carolyn Burns

=== Officer (OBE) ===
Civil division

- Eileen Rewa Begg – of Waikanae. For services to commercial education.
- Eric Wilfred Benton – of Wellington. For services to journalism.
- John Bruce Chrystall – of Ongaonga. For services to the wool industry.
- Roland Henry Clark – of Diamond Harbour. For services to agriculture.
- George Hopeful Gower – of Tokirima. For services to local-body and community affairs.
- Geoffrey Philip Howarth MBE – of Tauranga. For services to cricket.
- Thomas Michael Raeburn Maskew – of Christchurch. For services to agriculture.
- Alfred George Morgan-Coakle – of Auckland. For services to legal aid.
- Dr Francis John Newhook – of Auckland; professor emeritus of plant pathology, Department of Botany, University of Auckland.
- James Joseph O'Connor JP – of Hastings. For services to local government, sport and the community.
- William Horace Phillips JP – of Hāwera. For services to farming and the community.
- Dr Humphrey Barton Rainey – of Upper Hutt. For services to medicine and the community.
- Dr Mutyala Satyanand – of Auckland. For services to the community.
- John Hutchison Saunders – of Lower Hutt. For services to orthopaedics.
- Charles Herbert Speight – of Wellington; general manager, Shipping Corporation of New Zealand.
- Dr Charles Swanston – of Auckland. For services to ophthalmology.
- Thomas Victor Thomson – superintendent, New Zealand Police.
- Major Ross Tylden JP – of Mataraua, Northland. For services to farming.
- Clifford Ernest Wiseley JP – of Morrinsville. For services to education and local government.

Military division

- Captain Eric David Deane – Royal New Zealand Navy.
- Colonel Malcolm John Ross – Colonels' List, New Zealand Army.
- Group Captain Allan Tennant Dickie – Royal New Zealand Air Force.

=== Member (MBE) ===
Civil division

- James Charles Bellwood – of Auckland. For services to athletics.
- Jack Compton Blakeley JP – of Raumati South. For services to the surf lifesaving movement.
- Wilfred Edward Bown – of Blenheim. For services to local-body and community affairs.
- Maida Elizabeth Claire Bryant JP – of Hokitika. For services to the community.
- James Maurice Maitland Caffin – of Christchurch. For services to the New Zealand Antarctic Society and journalism.
- Lionel Graham Christiansen – of Cambridge. For services to the dairy industry.
- Joan Ethel Derbidge – of Christchurch. For services to physiotherapy and welfare organisations.
- Captain Emmet Peter Marcus Dowd – of Auckland. For services to aviation.
- Stanley Alexander Gurnell – of Whangārei. For services to pre-school education and the community.
- James Herbert Henderson – of Auckland. For services to literature and broadcasting.
- Dr Donald William McKenzie – of Havelock North; pomologist and senior scientist, Department of Scientific and Industrial Research orchard, Havelock North.
- Anne Kohi Martin – of Papakura. For services to social welfare.
- Elsie Elizabeth Neil – of Auckland. For services to the community.
- Phyllis May Persen – of Palmerston North; lately chief nursing officer, Palmerston North Hospital Board.
- Caroline Audrey Prowse – of Waiuku. For services to the community.
- Miriam Florence Redwood (Miriam McGregor) – of Waipawa. For services to literature.
- Joan Nancy Roscoe – of Auckland. For services to the Girls' Brigade.
- Andrew Gwillym Summers – of Lower Hutt; deputy Secretary of Energy, Corporate Services, Ministry of Energy.
- William Alexander Sutherland JP – of Gisborne. For services to the Cook Hospital Board.
- Roger Robertson Sutton – of Invercargill. For services to conservation.
- Hugh Barre Mewburn Walker JP – of Auckland. For services to the Auckland Waterside Workers' Union.
- Louis Lester Wintle – of Mangawhai. For services to the preservation of local history.
- Samuel Philip Wrightson – of Auckland; senior specialist, neurosurgery, Auckland Hospital.

Military division

- Warrant Officer Yeoman of Signals Noel George Carter – Royal New Zealand Navy.
- Lieutenant Commander Peter William Monk – Royal New Zealand Navy.
- Warrant Officer Control Electrical Artificer Samuel Popata – Royal New Zealand Navy.
- Major David Roland Abbott – Royal New Zealand Electrical and Mechanical Engineers.
- Captain John Gifford Sinton – Royal New Zealand Artillery (Territorial Force).
- Warrant Officer Class I Mel Wilson Webb – Royal New Zealand Infantry Regiment.
- Warrant Officer Owen John Cunliffe – Royal New Zealand Air Force.
- Warrant Officer Harvey Reynolds Howard – Royal New Zealand Air Force.

== British Empire Medal (BEM) ==
Military division

- Chief Petty Officer Administration Raymond Harold Thompson – Royal New Zealand Naval Volunteer Reserve.
- Lance Corporal Earle Alexander John Henry – New Zealand Special Air Service.
- Sergeant Ian Ralph Clifford – Royal New Zealand Air Force.
- Flight Sergeant Allan Kenneth Sheppard – Royal New Zealand Air Force.

== Companion of the Queen's Service Order (QSO) ==
=== For community service ===
- Joyce Horton Andrews – of Mangakino.
- Henry Tahawai Bird – of Murupara.
- Hector Jack Clark BEM – of Auckland.
- The Reverend Canon Wi Te Tau Huata MC – of Hastings.

=== For public services ===
- Leonard John Braddock – of Thames.
- The Honourable Michael Aynsley Connelly MP – of Christchurch.
- Albert Bakewell Fear – of Lower Hutt; director-general of housing, Housing Corporation of New Zealand, and general manager, Rural Banking and Finance Corporation.
- Leonard Manson Harvey – of Ōpunake.
- Ralph Henry Matthews JP – of Waipukurau.
- Joyce Motley – of Hamilton; principal nurse, Waikato Hospital.
- Alfred Preece JP – of Chatham Islands.
- Robert Geoffrey Ramshaw – of Frankton.
- Mangus Kenneth de Chazal Spence JP – of Te Karaka.
- Henry Philip Whitlock – of Gisborne.

== Queen's Service Medal (QSM) ==
=== For community service ===
- Harold Raymond Ashworth – of New Plymouth.
- Pattie Helen Collins – of Murupara.
- Bertram Cornthwaite – of Auckland.
- Nancy Eleanor Cresswell – of Blenheim.
- Winifred Charlotte Cuming – of Taupō.
- Alice Maud des Forges – of Taupiri.
- David Spencer Funnell – of Palmerston North.
- Trevor Charles Gottermeyer – of Christchurch.
- Cecily Gregory – of Levin.
- Elsie Helen Hill – of Mataura.
- Adeline Pearl Hobbs – of Lower Hutt.
- Evelyn Doris Hodder – of Thames.
- Charles Thomas Ross Knew – of Whangārei.
- Charles Earle William Levin – of Sanson.
- Douglas Ian McKerras – of Palmerston North.
- Poai (Jim) Manahi – of Woodend.
- Mary Elizabeth (Moira) O'Brien – of Auckland.
- Keriana Bessie Olson – of Wainuiomata.
- Gladys May Philips – of Paihia.
- John Cotterell Purdue – of Invercargill.
- Margaret Cecelia Read – of Wellington.
- Edith Frances Smith – of Wanganui.
- Cicely Louise Snoxell – of Longburn.
- Frederick Ernest Williamson – of Invercargill.
- Mirinda Annie Zwimpfer – of Timaru.

=== For public services ===
- Dr Donald Young Allen – of Waipawa.
- Mary Anstruther JP – of Tūrangi.
- Brian Douglas Bell – of Wellington; assistant director (protected fauna), Wildlife Service, Department of Internal Affairs.
- Violet Patricia Darraugh – of Te Awamutu.
- Ailsa Maureen Fletcher – of Rotorua.
- Edna Abigail Free – of Hāwera.
- Thomas Charles Stewart Keith Gilbertson – of Ōtāne.
- Iris May Hambleton – of Greymouth.
- John Conroy Henderson – of Richmond.
- Thomas Holdom – of Ōakura.
- Marie Menary King – of Russell.
- John Hugh McFarlane – of Gisborne.
- Clifford Geeveston McIntosh – of Kaikohe.
- Robert Buchanan McNaughton – sergeant, New Zealand Police.
- Kate Alison Mickelson – of Ōpunake.
- Agnes Kathleen Muir JP – of Hamilton.
- John Taseki Osikai – of Auckland.
- Bruce Josiah Perigo – detective senior sergeant, New Zealand Police.
- Robert James Tarbotton – of Ashburton.
- Jeanette Annie Vickerman JP – of Auckland.

== Queen's Fire Service Medal (QFSM) ==
- Ronald Peter Bell – senior station officer, Ravensbourne Volunteer Fire Brigade, New Zealand Fire Service.
- Victor Donald Cooper – chief fire officer, Henderson Volunteer Fire Brigade, New Zealand Fire Service.
- Leonard Sydney Corner – fire commander, Christchurch Fire Brigade, New Zealand Fire Service.
- Derek Arthur Varley – fire force commander, Wellington Fire Brigade, New Zealand Fire Service.

== Queen's Police Medal (QPM) ==
- Lawrence Robert Woodgate – chief inspector, New Zealand Police.

== Air Force Cross (AFC) ==
- Squadron Leader Bruce Reid Ferguson – Royal New Zealand Air Force.
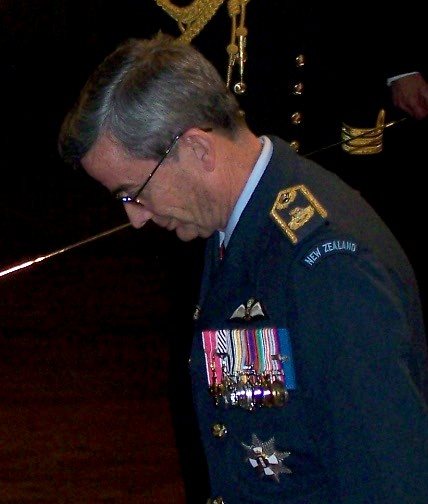
Bruce Ferguson
