= William George Stevens =

Military leader, diplomat

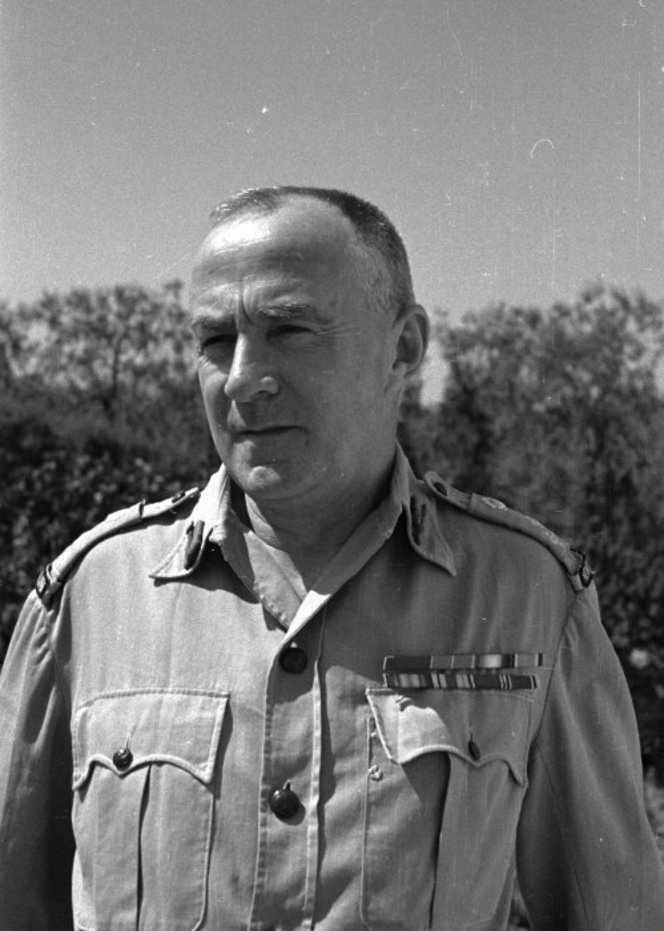
- Portrait of William George Stevens, 1943/44.
- Born: 11 December 1893; London, United Kingdom
- Died: 7 August 1975 (aged 81); Nelson, New Zealand
- Military career
- Allegiance: New Zealand
- Branch: New Zealand Military Forces
- Service years: 1912–1946
- Rank: Major-general
- Service number: 6356
- Conflicts: First World War; Gallipoli campaign; Western Front; Second World War
- Awards: Companion of the Order of the Bath; Commander of the Order of the British Empire
- Other work: Diplomat

Major-General William George Stevens, CB, CBE (11 December 1893 – 7 August 1975) was a New Zealand military leader and administrator.

Born in England, Stevens emigrated to New Zealand with his family in 1895. He joined the New Zealand Military Forces in 1912 and later served with the New Zealand Field Artillery during the First World War. Between the wars he attended Staff College in England and later held a number of positions which required co-ordination of civilian and military resources. During the Second World War he held important administrative roles in the 2nd New Zealand Expeditionary Force (2NZEF). He was commander of the 2NZEF from November 1945 to June 1946 and oversaw its demobilisation.

Stevens retired from the military in 1946 with the rank of major-general. He became a diplomat, serving at the New Zealand High Commission in London for several years before his retirement in 1953. He later authored two volumes of the Official History of New Zealand in the Second World War 1939–45. He died in 1975 in Nelson.

== Early life ==
William George Stevens was born in London, England, on 11 December 1893. His father, William Stevens, was a mariner employed by the New Zealand Shipping Company and would be absent from the family home for long periods of time while at sea. His mother, Catherine née Sclanders, was a former teacher. The Stevens family moved to New Zealand in 1895 and settled in Auckland. He attended Auckland Grammar School and planned to pursue a career in civil engineering but his mother encouraged him to enter the New Zealand Military Forces.

== Military career ==
In 1912, after initially being rejected due to a heart murmur, Stevens entered the Royal Military College at Duntroon in Australia as a cadet officer. He enjoyed his time at Duntroon but when the First World War broke out, his class was graduated early in November 1914.

=== First World War ===
Stevens was seconded to the New Zealand Expeditionary Force (NZEF) and was posted to the New Zealand Field Artillery. He embarked for Gallipoli with the fourth reinforcements in April 1915, going ashore in August of that year. Apart from a period of time during October which he spent in Malta recuperating from illness, he participated in the Gallipoli campaign until the Allied forces were evacuated in December 1915. In April 1916, he was transferred to the Western Front with the newly formed New Zealand Division.

In late December 1916, while recuperating from a horse-riding injury in England he married his fiancée, Gladys Baker, of Auckland. The couple had three children. He returned to active duty in early 1917 on attachment to the headquarters of the New Zealand Division. Later in the year, he suffered from trench foot for which he was hospitalised in England, before being appointed staff captain of the divisional artillery in December 1917. He was serving in this role when the war ended in November 1918. He was discharged from the NZEF in September 1919 with the rank of major.

=== Interwar period ===
Stevens returned to New Zealand in 1920, having using the intervening time to attend an artillery course in England. He had intended to quit the New Zealand Military Forces. However, upon earning top marks for the entrance examination for the Staff College in Camberley, he returned to England for a two-year course. After completing the course, he then went on to the Imperial Defence College in London. In 1929, Stevens was brought back to New Zealand as commander of the Royal Artillery, Central Command, based at Palmerston North. He then commanded the General Headquarters Training Depot at Trentham. He was also on the staff of General Headquarters's operations and intelligence branch.

While in London in the late 1920s, Stevens formed the view that New Zealand's future defence requirements would involve greater co-ordination between the civilian infrastructure of the government and the military. In 1937, when he was appointed as secretary of New Zealand's Council of Defence as well as the Chiefs of Staff Committee, he became absorbed in the Organisation for National Security. The organisation, consisting of a multitude of committees, was responsible for preparation of a manual detailing the actions necessary to bring the country to a war footing. This allowed Stevens the opportunity to put his theories in relation to integration of military and civilian resources into practice. As a result of his efforts, when war did break out in Europe in 1939, the infrastructure of New Zealand was well prepared for prompt mobilisation.

=== Second World War ===
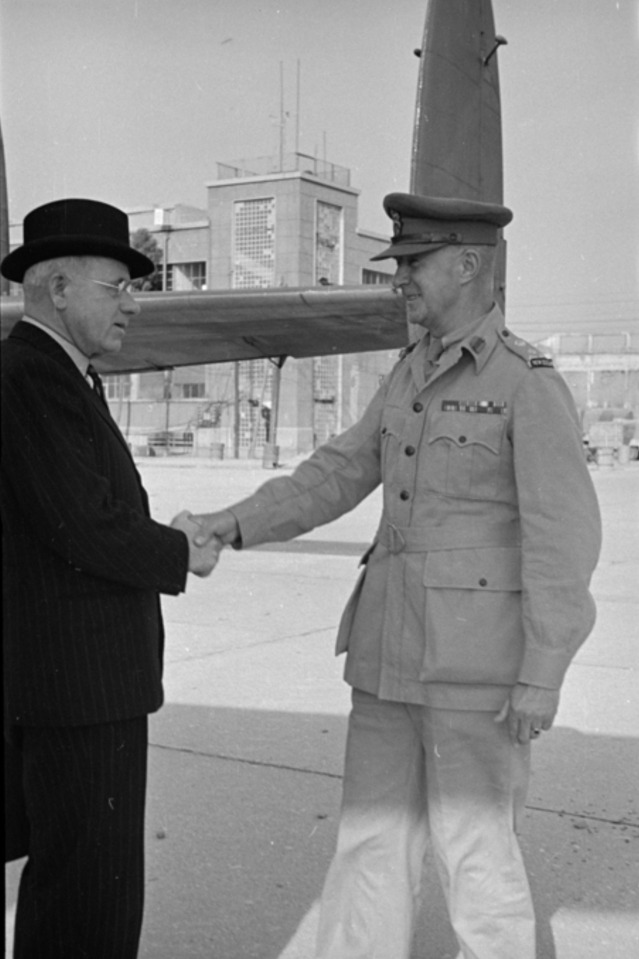
The then Brigadier Stevens greets Peter Fraser, Prime Minister of New Zealand, at Naples Airport, May 1944.

In late 1939, Stevens accompanied Peter Fraser, the acting prime minister of New Zealand, to London for talks with the British government, advising him on military affairs. He had worked with Fraser previously as part of the Council of Defence.

The 2nd New Zealand Expeditionary Force (2NZEF), consisting of a single division, the 2nd New Zealand Division, was then being raised in New Zealand for service overseas. Stevens, now a lieutenant colonel, was seconded to the 2NZEF and made assistant adjutant and quartermaster-general of the division. He duly embarked for Egypt with the 1st Echelon of the 2NZEF. In addition to his divisional duties, he was also required to administer the 2NZEF as a whole. Although an able administrator, the workload was excessive and in October 1940, he dropped his divisional responsibilities and was appointed officer in charge of administration of HQ 2NZEF. In this role, he controlled the various depots, administrative units and reinforcements for 2NZEF.

Stevens was based in Egypt from 1940 until 1944, when HQ 2NZEF was shifted to Italy. He was made a Commander of the Order of the British Empire and promoted to brigadier in 1941. This was followed three years later by an appointment as a Companion of the Order of the Bath. In November 1945, he reached the pinnacle of his military career when he was appointed general officer commanding, 2NZEF, replacing Bernard Freyberg. Promoted to major-general, he oversaw the demobilisation of the 2NZEF until mid-1946.

== Later life ==
After being overlooked for the role of chief of staff of the New Zealand Military Forces, Stevens decided that he did not desire a career in the peacetime army and retired in 1946. In June the same year he joined the Department of External Affairs and later took up a position as official secretary to the New Zealand High Commission in London. He retired in 1953 but continued to live with his wife in England rather than return to New Zealand. In 1953, both Stevens and his wife, Gladys, were awarded the Queen Elizabeth II Coronation Medal.

While in retirement, Stevens authored two volumes of the Official History of New Zealand in the Second World War 1939–45. The first was Problems of NZEF, published in 1958, and the second was Bardia to Enfidaville, published in 1962. By this time, he and his wife had moved back to New Zealand for financial and family reasons. He settled in Richmond, outside of Nelson in the South Island. He continued to write and in 1965, a work on the wartime service of his former commander, Freyberg, was published.

Stevens's last years were spent living in a retirement home in Stoke, a suburb of Nelson. He died of a heart attack on 7 August 1975, his wife having predeceased him in 1967, and his ashes were buried at Marsden Valley Cemetery.

== Publications ==
- Stevens, W. G. (1958). Problems of 2NZEF. Official History of New Zealand in the Second World War 1939–45. Wellington, New Zealand: War History Branch.
- Stevens, W. G. (1962). Bardia to Enfidaville. Official History of New Zealand in the Second World War 1939–45. Wellington, New Zealand: War History Branch.
- Stevens, W. G. (1965). Freyberg V.C., The Man 1939–1945. Auckland, New Zealand: AH & AW Reed Limited.
