= Tay Wilson =

Sir Tennant Edward "Tay" Wilson KNZM OBE (3 February 1925 – 26 October 2014) was the ninth member of the International Olympic Committee (IOC) from New Zealand, from 1988 to 2006 (being required to stand down when he turned 80), and later an honorary member. He was the last voluntary secretary-general of the NZOCGA, from 1985 to 1990, and was on many other sporting bodies.

Wilson was born in Feilding and attended Nelson College from 1938 to 1942. He was a competitive rower and was the double sculls New Zealand junior champion in 1959. He practised as a chartered accountant for 61 years, with his own firm Tay Wilson & Co in Lower Hutt and Wellington. Wilson replaced Lance Cross on the IOC in 1988.

He was New Zealand chef de mission at the 1980 Moscow Olympics (when New Zealand sent four sportspeople, who marched under the NZOCGA logo) and deputy chef de mission at the 1984 Los Angeles Olympics. He voted for London rather than Paris for the 2012 Olympics.

He was honoured as an Officer of the Order of the British Empire, for services to sport, in the 1989 Queen's Birthday Honours, and was appointed a Distinguished Companion of the New Zealand Order of Merit for services to the Olympic and Commonwealth Games in the 2007 New Year Honours. In August 2009, he accepted redesignation as a Knight Companion of the New Zealand Order of Merit, following the restoration of titular honours by the New Zealand government.

Wilson was a Freemason for over 60 years, and was a Past Grand Deacon.

He died in Wellington on 26 October 2014.
