= 1997 Birthday Honours (New Zealand) =

Awards list for New Zealand

1997 Queen's Birthday Honours
- Previous: 1997 New Year Honours; Next: 1998 New Year Honours
- Type: New Zealand royal honours: Order of New Zealand; New Zealand Order of Merit; Queen's Service Order; Queen's Service Medal
- Date: 2 June 1997
- Country: New Zealand

Highlights
- Total recipients: 176

The 1997 Queen's Birthday Honours in New Zealand, celebrating the official birthday of Queen Elizabeth II, were appointments made by the Queen in her right as Queen of New Zealand, on the advice of the New Zealand government, to various orders and honours to reward and highlight good works by New Zealanders. They were announced on 2 June 1997.

The recipients of honours are listed here as they were styled before their new honour.

== Order of New Zealand (ONZ) ==
Ordinary member

- Sir James Muir Cameron Fletcher – of Auckland.
- Dr Ivan Lichter – of Auckland.
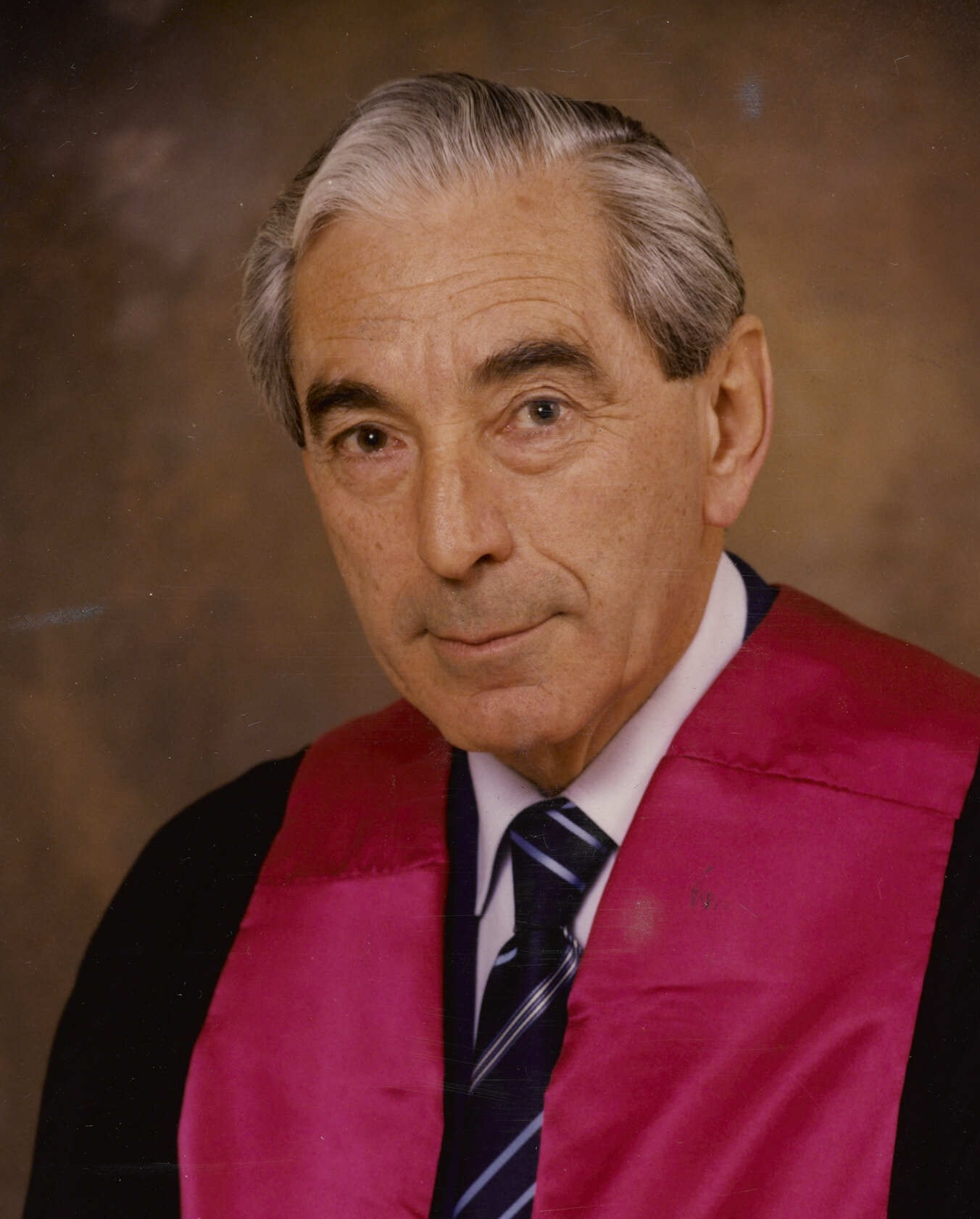
Ivan Lichter

== New Zealand Order of Merit ==
=== Dame Companion (DNZM) ===
- Janet Elaine Paul – of Wellington. For services to publishing, writing and painting.

=== Knight Companion (KNZM) ===
- Robert Arthur Owens CBE – of Auckland. For services to business and the community.
- The Honourable John Hamilton Wallace QC – of Auckland; lately a judge of the High Court.

=== Companion (CNZM) ===
- The Most Reverend Brian Newton Davis – of Wellington. For services to the Anglican Church and the community.
- Austin John Forbes QC – of Christchurch. For services to the legal profession.
- Professor Peter David Gluckman – of Auckland. For services to medicine.
- Dr Margaret Winn Guthrie – of Wellington. For services to gerontology.
- Nancy Wai-Lan Kwok-Goddard – of Wellington. For services to the community.
- John Leslie Munro DSO QSO DFC JP – of Te Kūiti. For services to local government and the community.
- Commodore David William Palmer – Royal New Zealand Navy.
- Hinetara Potaka OBE – of Te Puke. For services to the community.
- Dr Erihapeti Rehu-Murchie QSO JP – of Whanganui. For services to the community.
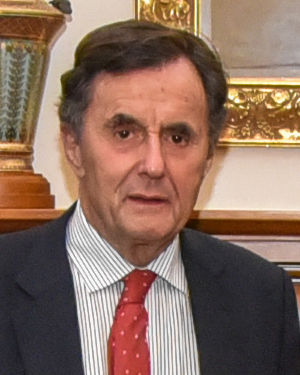
Austin Forbes

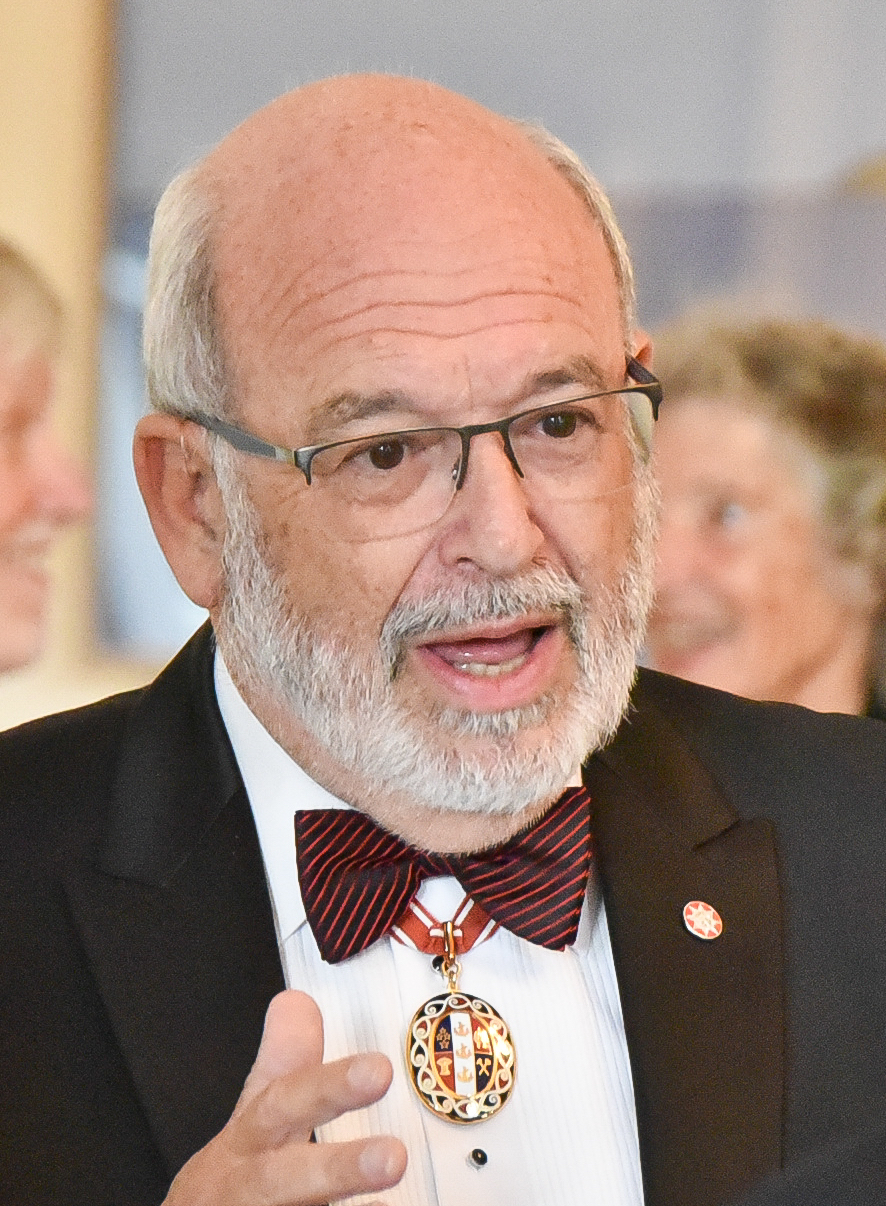
Peter Gluckman

=== Officer (ONZM) ===
- Graham Murray Bryant JP – of Awakino. For services to sheep breeding.
- Peter Standish Burke – of New Plymouth. For services to rugby.
- Group Captain Brian Carruthers AFC – Royal New Zealand Air Force.
- Morris David Chandler – of Auckland. For services to motorsport.
- Anthony John Farrington – of Wellington. For services to business and the community.
- Emeritus Professor Eric Desmond Fielden – of Palmerston North. For services to veterinary science.
- Leonard Bruce Gibbs – of Whakatāne. For services to mission work and the community.
- John Bernard Hart – of Auckland. For services to rugby.
- Denese Letitia Henare – of Auckland. For services to the Māori people.
- Dr John Clarence Hinchcliff – of Pukekohe. For services to education.
- Professor Linda Jane Holloway – of Wellington. For services to medicine.
- Ronald (Jock) MacGregor Irvine – of Auckland. For services to the legal profession.
- Dr John Blackburn Jillett – of Dunedin. For services to marine biology.
- James Bassett Macaulay – of Auckland. For services to banking and the community.
- Dr Ian Callum McGibbon – of Wellington. For services to historical research.
- Jennifer (Jenny) Helen McLeod – of Pukerua Bay. For services to music.
- Ivan Mercep – of Auckland. For services to architecture.
- Professor Raymond Francis Meyer – of Auckland. For services to education and engineering.
- Dr Brian Peter John Molloy – of Christchurch. For services to conservation.
- Milan Mrkusich – of Auckland. For services to painting.
- Peter Peryer – of Auckland. For services to photography.
- Dr Catherine Helen Barnard Smith – of Hamilton. For services to the veterinary profession.
- Dr William Ronald James Sutton – of Rotorua. For services to forestry.
- David Patterson Synnott – of Wellington. For service to athletics.
- Stephen Robert Tindall – of Auckland. For services to business and the community.
- Professor Alison Ann Trotter – of Dunedin. For services to historical research.
- Dr Ronald Valentine Trubuhovich – of Auckland. For services to medicine.
- Professor Christine Coe Winterbourn – of Christchurch. For services to medical research.

Additional

- Commander Paul David Gilkison – Royal New Zealand Navy.
- Lieutenant Colonel Steven Guy Ransley – Corps of Royal New Zealand Engineers.

Honorary

- Professor Claudia De Vita Scott – of Wellington. For services to public administration and the community.
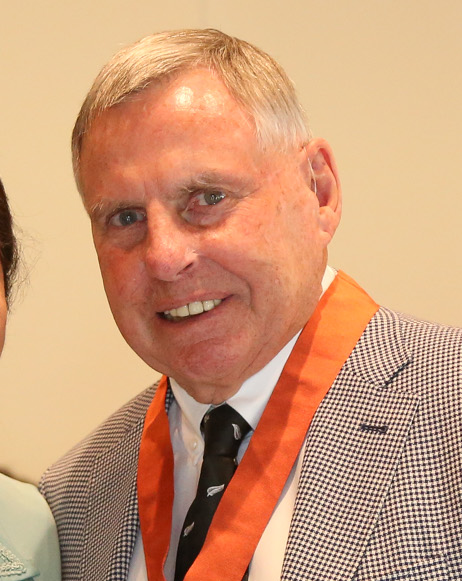
John Hart

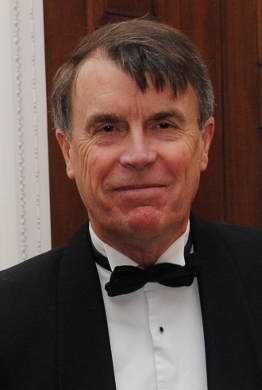
Ian McGibbon

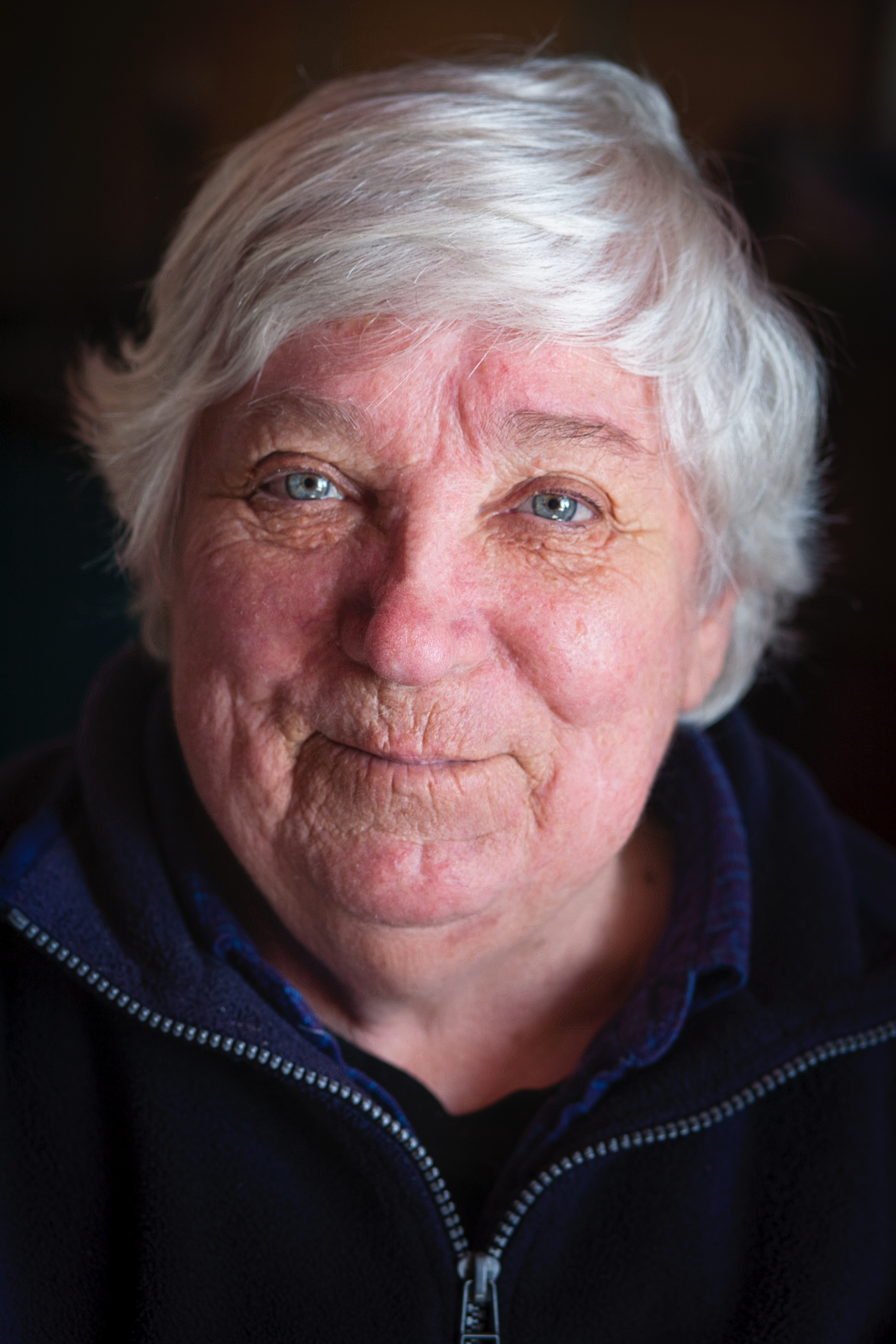
Jenny McLeod

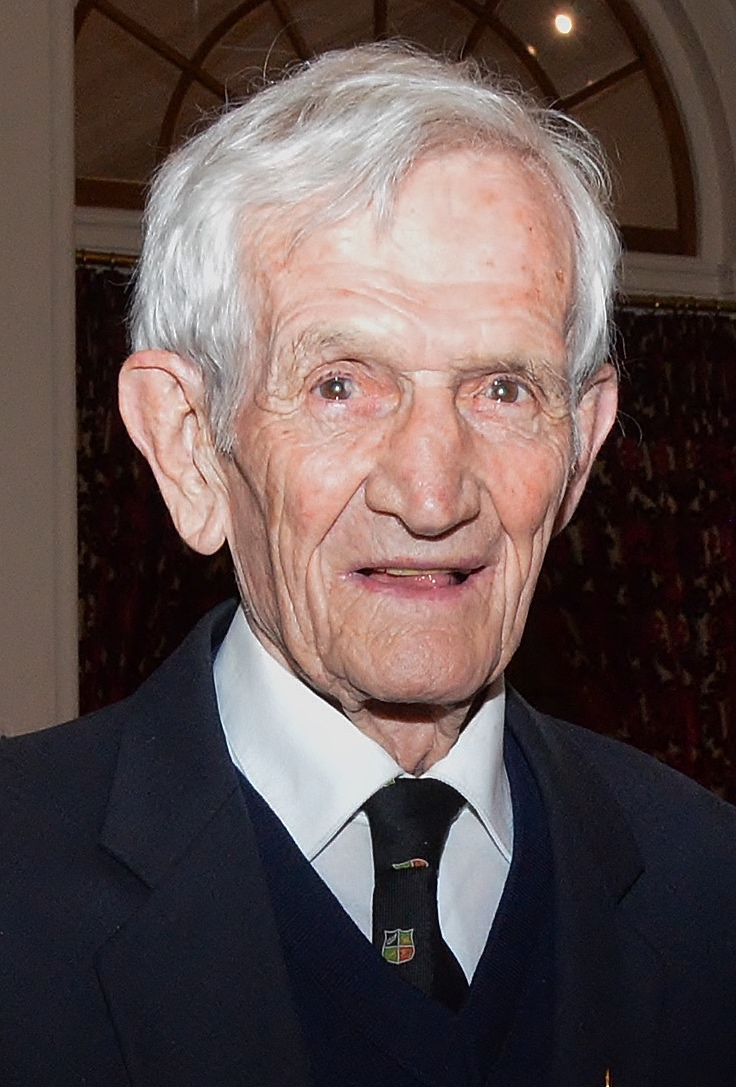
Brian Molloy

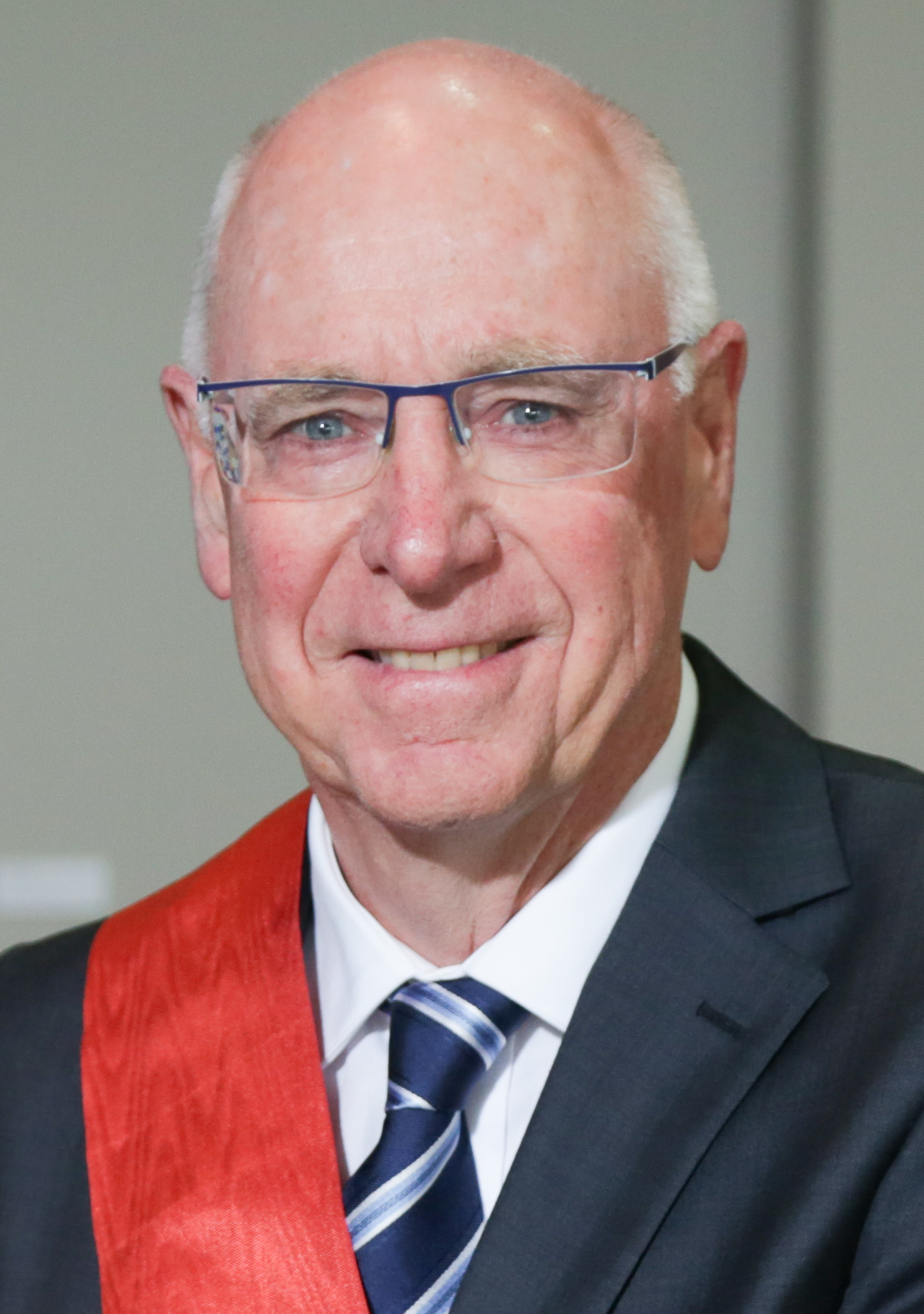
Stephen Tindall

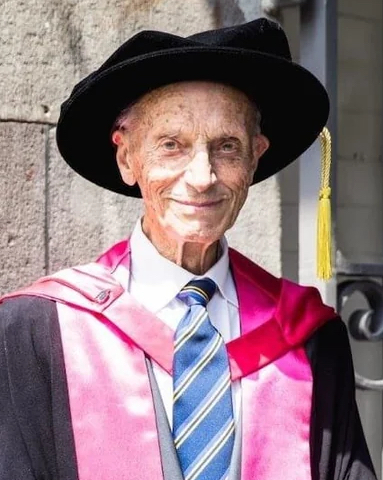
Ron Trubuhovich

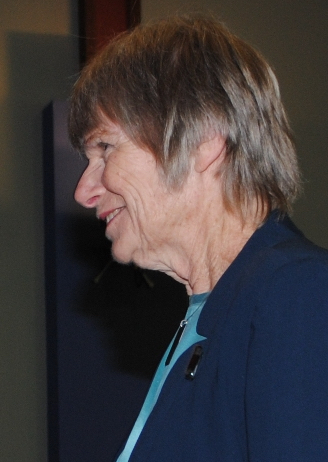
Christine Coe Winterbourn

=== Member (MNZM) ===
- Rex Albert Anderson – of Christchurch. For services to sports administration and the community.
- Hilary Claire Atchinson – of Waiuku. For services to the community.
- The Honourable Margaret Elizabeth Austin – of Christchurch. For public services.
- Major Robert Philip Barlin, New Zealand Army (Ret.) – of Tbilisi, Republic of Georgia. For services to humanitarian concerns.
- Gordon Joseph Blake JP – of Tīrau. For services to local government.
- Maurice Leicester Chatfield JP – of Auckland. For services to the community.
- Dr Una Vivienne Cooper – of Hamilton. For services to marine biology.
- Margaret Cross JP – of Warkworth. For services to the community.
- Robert Anthony Crowder – of Lincoln. For services to organic husbandry.
- Dr Stewart James Edward JP – of Rotorua. For services to dentistry and the community.
- Betty Maureen Fitzmaurice – of Auckland. For services to the community.
- Kerry-Anne Gilberd – of Sydney, New South Wales, Australia. For services to ballet.
- The Reverend Father Issac Joseph Gupwell SM – of Whanganui. For services to Māori education.
- Hugh Edward Staples Hamilton – of Waipukurau. For services to local-body and community affairs. (Note: Appointment cancelled and annulled, 29 November 2018.)
- Barry James Harcourt – of Invercargill. For services to photography.
- Ian le Clerc Harvey – of Whangaparāoa. For services to music.
- Margaret Edith Harvey – of London, United Kingdom. For services to New Zealand wine exports.
- Flying Officer Sarah Lee Hodges – Royal New Zealand Air Force.
- Lieutenant Commander Richard John Howland – Royal New Zealand Navy.
- Florinda Louisa Lambert – of Inglewood. For services to the community.
- The Honourable Graeme Ernest Lee JP – of Auckland. For public services.
- Seong Bang Lee – of Christchurch. For services to business and the community.
- Katie Mason-Moses JP – of Blenheim. For services to the community.
- Carol Anne Moffatt – of Oxford. For services to education.
- Wing Commander Michael George Pobog-Jaworowski – Royal New Zealand Air Force.
- Warrant Officer Gary Maurice Portas – Royal New Zealand Air Force.
- Keith Quinn – of Lower Hutt. For services to sports journalism.
- Rererangi Rangihika – of Auckland; superintendent, New Zealand Police.
- Murray Craig Reid – of Auckland. For services to sport and the community.
- Ian Ewart Searle – of Whakatāne. For services to physiotherapy.
- Kenneth George Smith – of Victoria, Australia. For services to music.
- William Farquhar Smith JP – of Auckland. For services to agriculture.
- Mary Forbes Symmans JP – of Hamilton. For services to the community.
- Erica Judith Tenquist JP – of Featherston. For services to the community.
- Raymond Benjamin Topia – of Whangārei; deputy chief fire officer, Kamo Volunteer Fire Brigade, New Zealand Fire Service.
- Warrant Officer Class I Keith Douglas Walker – Royal New Zealand Armoured Corps.
- Warrant Officer Control Electrical Artificer Colin Dennis White – Royal New Zealand Navy.
- Frederick David Wilson – of Whanganui. For services to the community.

Additional

- Lieutenant Commander John Fergus Campbell – Royal New Zealand Navy.
- Petty Officer Torpedo and Anti Submarine Instructor Miles James Singe – Royal New Zealand Navy.
- Major Ainsley Warren Leadley Watson – Royal New Zealand Army Logistic Regiment.

Honorary

- Takashige Katsuno – of Fukuoka-shi, Japan. For services to New Zealand interests in Japan.
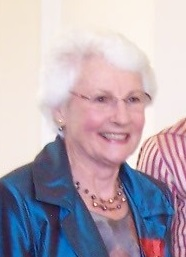
Margaret Austin

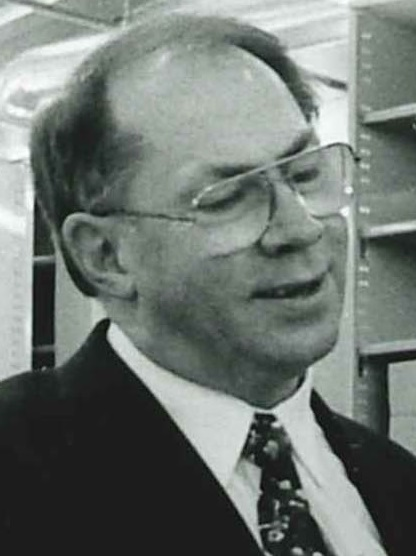
Graeme Lee

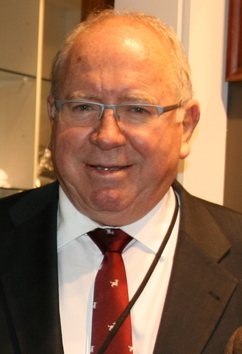
Keith Quinn

== Companion of the Queen's Service Order (QSO) ==
=== For community service ===
- Myra Margaret Barry – of Christchurch.
- Daphne Elizabeth Bluett – of Matamata.
- Shirley Annette Ellis – of Nelson.
- Robert Derek Haddoc – of Auckland.
- Mary Hope Meade (Sister Dorothea) – of Whanganui.
- Constance Betty Owen – of Tauranga.
- Heather Munro Russell – of Whanganui.
- Lurleen Grace Straith – of Invercargill.

=== For public services ===
- Francis John Cameron – of Lower Hutt.
- Claude Augustine Edwards – of Ōpōtiki.
- Dr Douglas William Girvan JP – of Dunedin.
- Ian Munro Mackay – of Wellington.
- Dorothy Brett Moon – of Ashburton.
- Fergus Gordon Paterson – of Picton.
- Ewing Robertson JP – of Havelock North.
- Malcolm James Campbell Templeton – of Wellington.
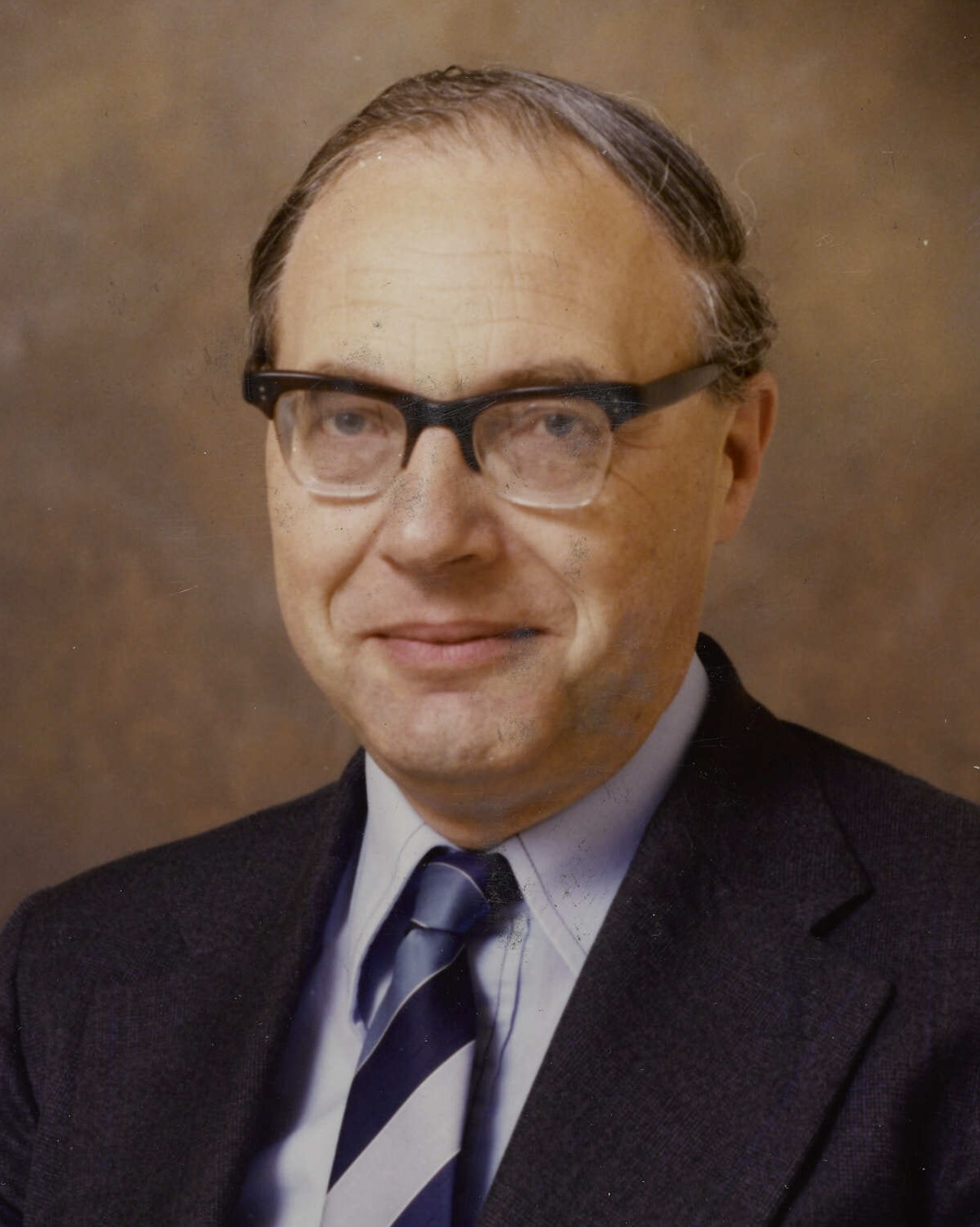
Douglas Girvan

== Queen's Service Medal (QSM) ==
=== For community service ===
- Angela Dorothy Holden Antony – of North Shore City.
- Amelia Batistich – of Auckland.
- Charles Tamati Bluett ED – of Whakatāne.
- Frances Robyn Bridgman – of Auckland.
- Darrell Le Marchant Carey ED – of Huntly.
- Eric James Clarke – of Paraparaumu Beach.
- Patricia Mavis Coope – of Great Barrier Island.
- Kathleen Rees Dalziel – of Ōtorohanga.
- William John Dalziel – of Ōtorohanga.
- Yvonne June Davison – of Greymouth.
- Mary Lilian Dobbie – of Auckland.
- George Maitland Duncan – of Gore.
- Shirley Diana (Billie) Galloway – of Auckland.
- William Kenneth Galloway – of Auckland.
- Gloria Elizabeth Hammond – of Greymouth.
- Bruce Henry Howell – of Te Kūiti.
- Miss Isla Irvine Hunter – of Christchurch.
- Ernest John Knox – of Wainuiomata.
- Mary Edith Ann Mackay – of Levin.
- Major David Thomas Millar – of Auckland.
- Ngaire Patricia Ockwell – of Mosgiel.
- Dawn Persson JP – of Auckland
- Robert Bruce Pulman – of Auckland.
- Valda Scott – of Auckland.
- Denis John Sheehan – of Rangiora.
- Agnes Jane (Nancy) Sibley – of Gisborne.
- Rita Mavis Simmonds – of Napier.
- Philip Walter d'Arcy Stewart – of Amberley.
- Brian Douglas Sutton – of Levin.
- James George Tate – of Ashburton.
- Sally Mary Thompson – of Christchurch.
- Hape Nuia Waikari JP – of Upper Hutt.
- Pirihira Priscilla Mei Wakefield – of Napier.
- Eleanor Ward – of Tokoroa.
- Lillie Watson JP – of Waitakere (West Auckland).
- Poppy Watts – of Lower Hutt.
- Allister Edmund Williamson – of Raglan.
- Melphie Josephine Wilson – of Featherston.
- Claud James Wintle – of Mangawhai.
- Isla Vivienne Woodham – of Hokitika.
- Shirley Lorraine Wright JP – of Kawerau.
- Donald McNearnie Frank Yeates – of Levin.
- Niborom Young – of Wellington.
- Wilfred Campbell Young JP – of Renwick.
Angela Antony

=== For public services ===
- Robert Henry Bell JP – of Ashburton.
- John William Blackwood – of Palmerston North.
- Lawrence William Blakemore – of Pleasant Point.
- Isabel Margaret Buist – of Eastbourne.
- Margaret Constance Cantwell – of Tauranga.
- Christopher Stanis Diamond – of Kaikohe.
- Laurance Douglas Fleming – of Thames; lately chief fire officer, Thames Volunteer Fire Brigade, New Zealand Fire Service.
- Bennett Eden Foster – of Waihi.
- Darren William Gamble – of Invercargill.
- Ian George Granger – of Napier.
- Catherine Violet Harris – of Orewa.
- Charles Laurence John Inder – of Ranfurly.
- Allan William Jupp JP – of Huntly.
- Elizabeth Jean Lockington – of Nelson.
- Shirley Joan Maihi – of Manukau City.
- Peter John Mitford-Burgess – of Bombay; detective senior sergeant, New Zealand Police.
- Jean Margaret Montague – of Auckland.
- Ngawini Toka Puru – of Auckland.
- Sara Bernardine Shand – of Dipton.
- Barry Alan Shepherd – of Taupō; senior constable, New Zealand Police.
- John Hubert Skilton – of Nelson.
- Philip Parnell Spackman – of Rotorua; senior sergeant, New Zealand Police.
- Harold George Henry Thomas JP – of Waikanae.
- Leanne Sharon Wheeler – of Te Kūiti.
- Robert Hutchinson White JP – of Springfield; chief fire officer, Springfield Volunteer Fire Brigade, New Zealand Fire Service.
- Nancy Isobel Winter – of Raetihi.
- Albert Edward Woolf JP – of Petone.
- Garrick Stanton Workman JP – of Ohakune.
- Raymond Robert Wright JP – of Wellington.
