= Yvette Williams =

New Zealand athlete (1929–2019)

Dame Yvette Corlett DNZM MBE
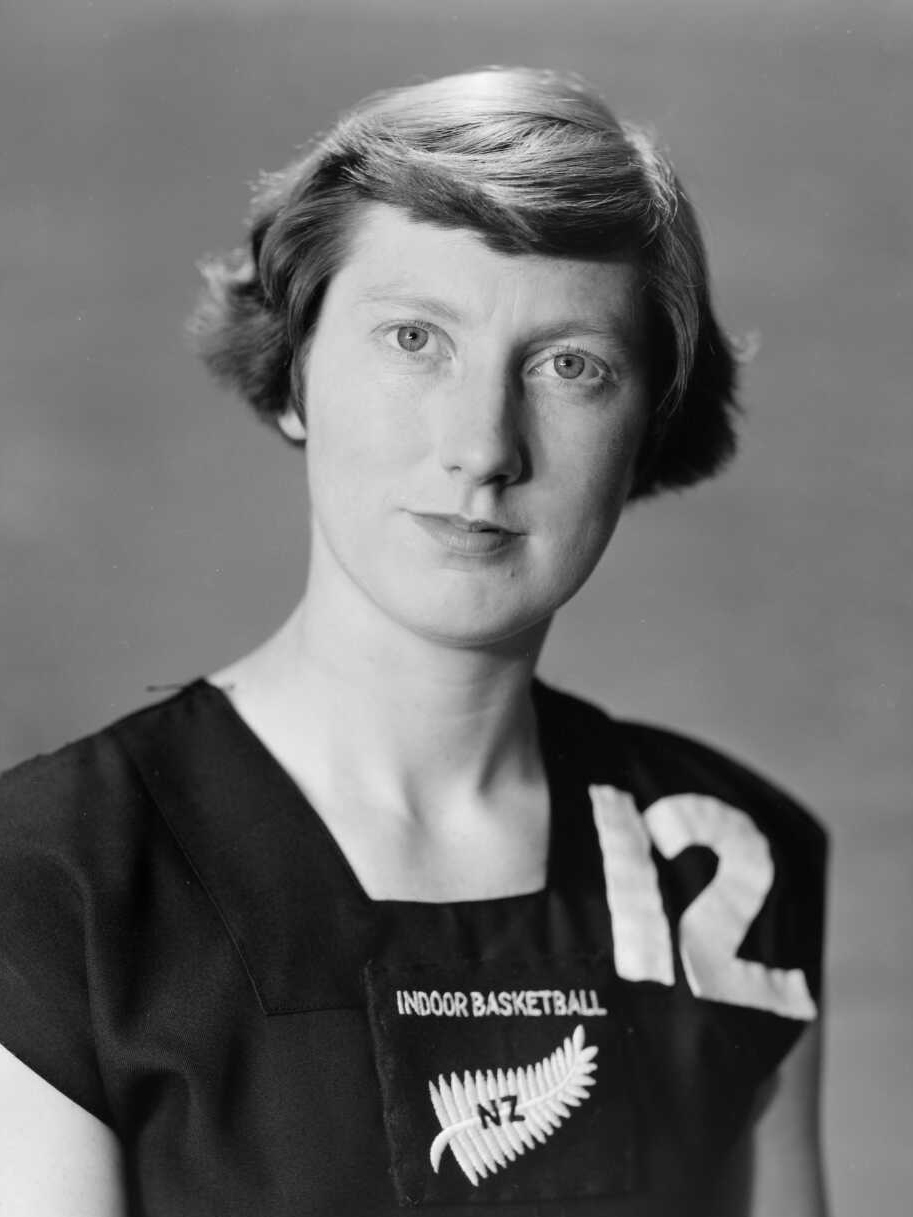
- Williams in 1954

Personal information
- Born: Yvette Winifred Williams; 25 April 1929 Dunedin, New Zealand
- Died: 13 April 2019 (aged 89) Auckland, New Zealand
- Height: 1.75 m (5 ft 9 in)
- Spouse: Charles Armistice Corlett (m. 1954; died 2015)
- Relative: Roy Williams (brother)

Sport
- Country: New Zealand
- Sport: Track and field
- Coached by: Jim Bellwood
- Retired: 1954

Achievements and titles
- National finals: Long jump champion (1948, 1949, 1950, 1951, 1952, 1953, 1954); Shot put champion (1947, 1948, 1949, 1950, 1951, 1952, 1953, 1954); Discus champion (1951, 1952, 1953, 1954); Javelin champion (1950); 80 m hurdles champion (1954)
- Personal bests: 200 m – 25.0 (1951); LJ – 6.28 m (1954); SP – 13.96 m (1954); DT – 47.85 m (1954)
Medal record
Women's athletics
Representing New Zealand
Olympic Games
Gold medal – first place	1952 Helsinki	Long jump
Commonwealth Games
Gold medal – first place	1950 Auckland	Long jump
Gold medal – first place	1954 Vancouver	Long jump
Gold medal – first place	1954 Vancouver	Discus throw
Gold medal – first place	1954 Vancouver	Shot put
Silver medal – second place	1950 Auckland	Javelin throw

Dame Yvette Winifred Corlett DNZM MBE (née Williams; 25 April 1929 – 13 April 2019) was a New Zealand track-and-field athlete who was the first woman from her country to win an Olympic gold medal and to hold the world record in the women's long jump. Williams was named "Athlete of the Century" on the 100th anniversary of Athletics New Zealand, in 1987.

== Early life ==
Williams was born on 25 April 1929 in Dunedin. She grew up there and attended Otago Girls' High School. While at high school, Williams played several sports, making the top netball team and playing for Otago and the South Island. Williams also represented Otago, the South Island and New Zealand (1950, 1953–55) in basketball.

== Athletics career ==
Williams joined the Otago Athletic Club in early 1947, mainly for social reasons. Two months later, she came to national attention when she won the shot put at the New Zealand athletics championships. She went on to win 21 national titles across 5 disciplines: shot put (1947–54), javelin (1950), discus (1951–54), long jump (1948–54) and the 80 m hurdles (1954). With 21 New Zealand titles, she is the joint second-most successful New Zealand female athlete at that level, with Beatrice Faumuina and Melissa Moon, behind Val Young (35 titles).

Jim Bellwood, who had moved to Dunedin in late 1947 or early 1948, became her trainer. When Bellwood moved to Auckland in 1952 to teach at Avondale College, Williams followed, boarding with an aunt and uncle in Devonport.

Controversially left out of the New Zealand team for the 1948 Olympic Games in London, Williams won the long jump title at the 1950 British Empire Games in Auckland. Her winning leap of 19 feet 4 5/8 inches (5.91 m) broke the national, Empire Games, and British Empire records. At the same competition, she also won the silver medal in the women's javelin, with a throw of 124 feet 6 3/4 inches (37.97 m).

In 1951 Williams jumped 20 feet 1 3/8 inches (6.13 m) at a meet in Melbourne, the third-best distance ever by a woman at that time, increased her New Zealand shot put record, and also became the New Zealand discus record holder.

At the 1952 New Zealand championships, Williams became the first woman in history to jump over 20 feet (6.10 m) more than once, winning the long jump title with a distance of 20 feet 7 3/4 inches (6.29 m), but the distance was not recognised as a world record as it was wind-assisted. Also in 1952 she recorded a score of 4219 points in the pentathlon, setting a New Zealand record that stood for 10 years.

Williams won the gold medal in the long jump at the 1952 Olympics in Helsinki; her winning distance of 6.24 m was a new Olympic record and 1 cm short of Fanny Blankers-Koen's world record set in 1943. Also at Helsinki, Williams finished in sixth place in the shot put and 10th in the discus throw.

In February 1954, Williams broke the women's long jump world record at Gisborne, New Zealand, with a leap of 6.28 metres. Later that year she travelled to Vancouver for the 1954 British Empire and Commonwealth Games, winning gold medals in the long jump, discus, and shot put, all with Empire Games record performances, and finishing sixth in the 80 m hurdles. She announced her retirement from athletic competition in November 1954. At the time she ranked number one in world track and field history in the long jump, fifth in the pentathlon, 12th in the discus throw and 19th in the shot put.

== Personal life ==
Williams married Buddy Corlett, a member of the national basketball team, in Auckland on 11 December 1954. The couple had four children, including national basketball representative Neville Corlett; Auckland provincial rugby union player Peter Corlett, and Karen Corlett, who represented New Zealand in rhythmic gymnastics at the 1977 world championships.

Williams' younger brother, Roy Williams, won the decathlon at the 1966 British Empire and Commonwealth Games in Kingston, Jamaica.

Buddy Corlett died on 9 May 2015.

Williams died in Auckland on 13 April 2019 at the age of 89, 12 days before her 90th birthday. She is buried at Purewa Cemetery.

== Honours and awards ==
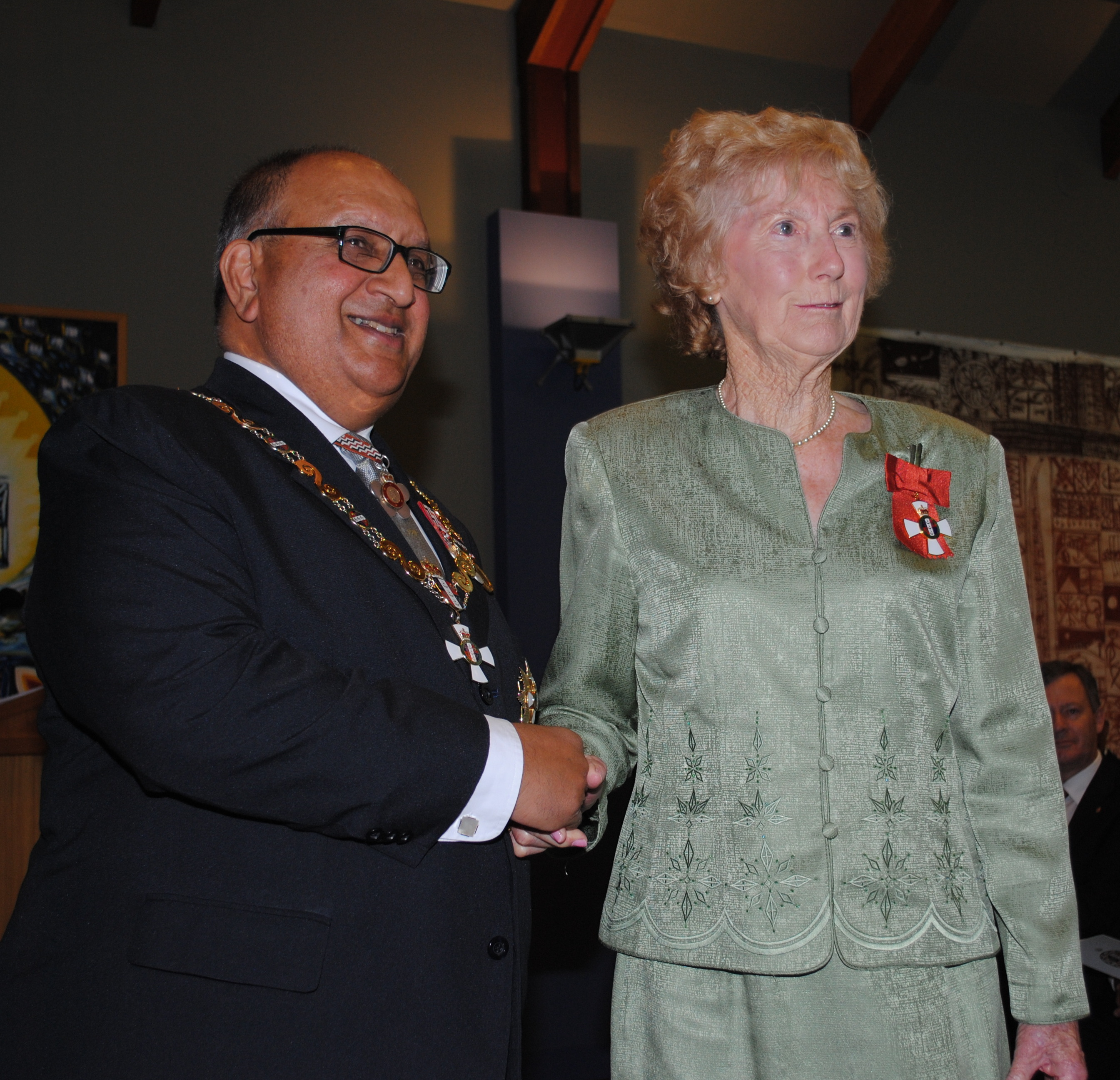
Corlett, after her investiture as a Companion of the New Zealand Order of Merit by the governor-general, Sir Anand Satyanand, in 2011

In the 1953 New Year Honours, Williams was made a Member of the Order of the British Empire, for services in women's athletics.

She was appointed a Companion of the New Zealand Order of Merit for services to athletics in the 2011 New Year Honours.

Williams was twice named the New Zealand Sportsman of the Year, for 1950 and 1952.

She was inducted into the New Zealand Sports Hall of Fame in 1990. In 2000, she was voted Otago Sportsperson of the Century. Sports writer Peter Heidenstrom, author of the book Athletes of the Century, rates her as New Zealand's top athlete of the 20th century.

The "Yvette Williams Retirement Village" in the Dunedin suburb of Roslyn is named in her honour. In 2013, the New Zealand Olympic Committee, in association with the Glenn Family Foundation, established the Yvette Williams Scholarship, to assist young athletes displaying both exceptional talent and need.

In the 2019 Queen's Birthday Honours, Williams was posthumously promoted to Dame Companion of the New Zealand Order of Merit, for services to athletics; the Queen's approval of the honour took effect on 12 April, the day before Williams's death. She had been advised of the award before her death.

== See also ==
- New Zealand Olympic medallists

Records
Preceded by Fanny Blankers-Koen	Long jump world record holder 20 February 1954 – 18 November 1955	Succeeded by Galina Vinogradova
