= Buddy Corlett =

New Zealand sportsman (1921–2015)

Buddy Corlett MBE
Personal information
- Born: Charles Armistice Corlett; 11 November 1921 Alberta, Canada
- Died: 9 May 2015 (aged 93) Auckland, New Zealand
- Spouse: Yvette Winifred Williams (m. 1954)
- Relative: Roy Williams (brother-in-law)

Sport
- Country: New Zealand
- Sport: Softball, basketball

Charles Armistice "Buddy" Corlett MBE (11 November 1921 − 9 May 2015) was a New Zealand sportsman. Born in Canada, he emigrated to New Zealand and represented his adopted country in both softball and basketball. He married New Zealand's first female Olympic gold medallist, Yvette Williams, in 1954.

== Biography ==
Born in the Canadian province of Alberta in 1921, Corlett emigrated to New Zealand, where he was a noted softball player. A third baseman known for his strong throw, he represented Auckland for 15 years, and also represented New Zealand. He also played for the New Zealand national basketball team.

A lifelong supporter of the YMCA, Corlett was the manager of the Panmure Young Citizens' Centre from its establishment in 1958. He was also involved in the formation of the Panmure Squash Club in 1965.

In 1954 he married field athlete Yvette Williams, who had become the first New Zealand woman to win an Olympic gold medal, in the long jump at the 1952 Olympic Games in Helsinki. The couple had four children, including national basketball representative Neville Corlett, Auckland provincial rugby union player Peter Corlett, and Karen Corlett, who represented New Zealand in rhythmic gymnastics at the 1977 world championships.

In the 1974 New Year Honours, Corlett was appointed a Member of the Order of the British Empire, for services to the community. In 2008, he was inducted as a Legend of Auckland Softball, and he was also named as one of the 10 most outstanding New Zealand basketball players of the 20th century.

Corlett died in Auckland in 2015.
