= Lance Cross =

New Zealand basketball player, sports administrator and broadcaster (1912–1989)

Sir Lance Cross CBE
- Born: Cecil Lancelot Stewart Cross; 12 November 1912; Dunedin, New Zealand
- Died: 13 May 1989 (aged 76); Wellington, New Zealand

Sir Cecil Lancelot Stewart Cross CBE (12 November 1912 – 13 May 1989), commonly known as Lance Cross, was the eighth member of the International Olympic Committee from New Zealand, from 1969 to 1987.

== Biography ==
Cross was born in Dunedin, New Zealand, on 12 November 1912, and attended Timaru Boys' High School from 1925 to 1929. In 1940, he married Amy Taylor, and the couple went on to have two children.

He was appointed chairman of the New Zealand Olympic Committee in 1967, and was Head of Sports Broadcasting for the New Zealand Broadcasting Corporation from 1953 to 1975. In 1969, Cross became the New Zealand International Olympic Committee member in 1969. He was replaced on the IOC by Tay Wilson in 1988.

Cross was made an Officer of the Order of the British Empire, for services to sports administration, in the 1973 New Year Honours, and promoted to Commander of the Order of the British Empire in the 1977 New Year Honours, for services to sport as a member of the International Olympic Committee and chairman of the New Zealand Olympic and Commonwealth Games Association. He was appointed a Knight Bachelor, for services to sport, in the 1984 Queen's Birthday Honours.

Cross died in Wellington in 1989.
