= Stephen Peter Llewellyn =

- Born: 18 July 1913; Hereford, Herefordshire, England
- Died: 14 November 1960 (aged 47); Waikanae, New Zealand
- Military career
- Branch: New Zealand Military Forces
- Service years: 1940–1945; 1950–1954
- Conflicts: Second World War; Battle of Greece; Battle of Crete; North African Campaign; Italian Campaign; Korean War
- Other work: Historian; Journalist

Stephen Peter Llewellyn MBE (18 July 1913 – 14 November 1960) was a New Zealand soldier, historian, journalist and novelist. Born in England, Llewwllyn work as a journalist before moving in New Zealand in the late 1930s. He served with the 2nd New Zealand Expeditionary Force during the Second World War. After the war, he wrote a volume of the Official History of New Zealand in the Second World War 1939–45; this was Journey Towards Christmas, an account of the exploits of the Divisional Ammunition Company, with which he had served during the war. He served with Kayforce during the Korean War, first as a public relations officer and then as commander of the Divisional Transport Platoon. Returning to civilian life as a freelance journalist at the end of 1954, he later had three novels published, one after his death from heart issues in 1960.

== Early life ==
Stephen Peter Llewellyn was born in Hereford in Herefordshire, England, on 18 July 1913 to a government valuer, Arthur Henry Llewellyn, and his wife, Martha Helen née Scott. He attended Durlston Court School before going on to Felsted School. His formal education was completed by 1931 and he started work as a journalist, serving as an apprentice for four years. In the mid-1930s, he was on the staff of the Daily Express before working freelance. Llewellyn emigrated to Auckland in New Zealand in the late-1930s and found work as a labourer with the Public Works Department.

== Second World War ==
Following the outbreak of the Second World War, Llewellyn enlisted in the 2nd New Zealand Expeditionary Force (2NZEF) for service aboard. Assigned to the Divisional Ammunition Company, he left New Zealand for the Middle East in early 1940 with the rest of the 1st Echelon of the 2NZEF. He served as a driver throughout many of the campaigns that the 2NZEF was involved in during the war, seeing action in Greece, Crete, North Africa and Italy. Towards the end of 1944, he was appointed the historian of the Divisional Ammunition Company. He returned in New Zealand in 1946 and was posted to the archives section of the headquarters of the New Zealand Military Forces. He was discharged from the 2NZEF the following year, having attained the rank of warrant officer.

== Official histories ==
At the time of Llewellyn's discharge, Sir Howard Kippenberger, the Editor-in-Chief of the Official History of New Zealand in the Second World War 1939–45 series that was being produced by the War History Branch, was in the process of selecting authors to produce official histories of the units of the 2NZEF. Llewellyn was contracted to write the volume for the Divisional Ammunition Company, with which he had served during the war. His book was entitled Journey towards Christmas and was published in 1949. It was particularly well received and commended for its narrative style, in contrast to some other volumes of the official histories which were thought to be turgid and stilted. Part of Kippenberger's work involved the production of what were called Episodes and Studies, booklets of specific aspects of the war; Llewellyn wrote one of these, entitled Troopships, which discussed the transportation of the 2NZEF to and from New Zealand. This too was published in 1949.

After a short period working with the New Zealand Forest Service, Llewellyn returned to the United Kingdom for a time. He briefly worked in freelance journalism and broadcasting. Back in New Zealand by early 1950, Kippenberger contracted him to produce another official history, this time for the 18th Battalion. However, shortly afterwards the Korean War broke out and Llewellyn volunteered to join Kayforce, the New Zealand contribution to the United Nations Command. His appointment was as a public relations officer and commenced in December 1950. Kippenberger supported Llewellyn's application and extended his official history contract.

Llewellyn's role was to last for nearly two years, which he spent in Busan in Korea, and then Kure in Japan. He wrote reports on the activities of Kayforce for the New Zealand public. In 1953, he transferred to the Royal New Zealand Army Service Corps and was given command of the Divisional Transport Platoon. The same year, in the Coronation Honours, he was made a Member of the Order of the British Empire for his services. His term of duty with Kayforce ended in 1954 and he returned to New Zealand towards the end the year. By then, his contract with the War History Branch for the history of the 18th Battalion had been cancelled due to a lack of progress.

== Later life ==
In civilian life, Llewellyn resumed his career in freelance journalism. He also turned to writing fiction and 1958, while he was living in the United Kingdom to care for his ill mother, he published his first novel, The Score at Tea-time which was set in Japan during the Korean War and involved New Zealand and British characters in a courtmartial. A second novel, The Angel in the Coffin was published a few years later, and was a mystery set on a passenger ship destined for New Zealand. These two works, neither of which were considered to be "impressive", were written under the pen name of Michael Ellis. He also wrote a number of short stories and book reviews for the New Zealand Listener.

Stricken suddenly with a heart condition, Llewellyn died on 14 November 1960. At the time, he was living in Waikanae. A third novel, Kissing the Four Corners, was posthumously released in 1961. He never married.
