= 1906 in Australian literature =

This article presents a list of the historical events and publications of Australian literature during 1906.

== Books ==
- Guy Boothby – The Race of Life
- Edward Dyson – In the Roaring Fifties
- Rosa Praed — The Lost Earl of Ellan
- Ambrose Pratt
  - The Counterstroke
  - The Remittance Man
- Ethel Turner – In the Mist of the Mountains
- Lilian Turner – Betty the Scribe

== Short stories ==
- Guy Boothby – A Royal Affair, and Other Stories
- Edward Dyson – Fact'ry 'ands
- Mabel Forrest – "The Housekeeper"
- Steele Rudd – Back at Our Selection
- Thos. E. Spencer – The Surprising Adventures of Mrs. Bridget McSweeney

== Poetry ==
- Ada Cambridge – "Good-Bye"
- C. J. Dennis
  - "Cow"
  - "Weary"
- Louis Esson – "Brogan's Lane"
- George Essex Evans – The Secret Key and Other Verses
- Mabel Forrest – "The Circus Lion"
- Henry Lawson
  - "The Bard of Furthest Out"
  - "To Victor Daley"
- Louisa Lawson
  - "The Old Brown Hen"
  - "They Are Taking the Old Piano"
- Dorothy Frances McCrae – "Homesick"
- Hugh McCrae – "A Bridal Song"
- Bernard O'Dowd – The Silent Land and Other Verses
- A. B. Paterson – "Santa Claus in the Bush"
- Thos. E. Spencer – How M'Dougall Topped the Score and Other Verses and Sketches
- Bertram Stevens – An Anthology of Australian Verse (edited)

== Births ==
A list, ordered by date of birth (and, if the date is either unspecified or repeated, ordered alphabetically by surname) of births in 1906 of Australian literary figures, authors of written works or literature-related individuals follows, including year of death.

- 14 March – R. Wilkes Hunter, novelist (died 1991)
- 19 March – Godfrey Blunden, journalist and author (died 1996)
- 8 April — Max Afford, playwright and novelist (died 1954)
- 11 April – Cyril Pearl, journalist and humorist (died 1987)
- 15 April — James Picot, poet and critic (died 1944)
- 30 April – Philip Lindsay, historical novelist (died 1958)
- 10 May – R. G. Howarth, poet and critic (died 1974)
- 22 December – Clive Turnbull, writer and journalist (died 1975)

Unknown date

- Mary Finnin, artist, art teacher and poet (died 1992)

== Deaths ==
A list, ordered by date of death (and, if the date is either unspecified or repeated, ordered alphabetically by surname) of deaths in 1906 of Australian literary figures, authors of written works or literature-related individuals follows, including year of birth.

- 6 February – James Bonwick, novelist and historian (born 1817)

== See also ==
- 1906 in Australia
- 1906 in literature
- 1906 in poetry
- List of years in Australian literature
- List of years in literature
