= 1899 in Australian literature =

This article presents a list of the historical events and publications of Australian literature during 1899.

== Books ==
- Rolf Boldrewood – 'War to the Knife', or, Tangata Maori
- Guy Boothby
  - Dr Nikola's Experiment
  - Love Made Manifest
  - The Red Rat's Daughter
  - A Sailor's Bride
- Louis de Rougemont – Adventures of Louis De Rougemont, as Told By Himself
- Nat Gould – The Dark Horse
- Ethel Pedley – Dot and the Kangaroo
- Rosa Praed – Madame Izan: A Tourist Story

== Short stories ==
- Louis Becke – Ridan the Devil and Other Stories
- Rolf Boldrewood – "The Mailman's Yarn: An Ower True Tale"
- Ernest Favenc – "Doomed"
- Lala Fisher
  - By Creek and Gully: Stories and Sketches Mostly of Bush Life, Told in Prose and Rhyme, by Australian Writers in England (edited)
  - "His Luck"
- E. W. Hornung – "Larrikin of Diamond Creek"
- Henry Lawson
  - "A Double Buggy at Lahey's Creek"
  - "The Loaded Dog"
- Steele Rudd
  - "Kate's Wedding"
  - "The Night We Watched for Wallabies"
  - On Our Selection
  - "The Summer Old Bob Died"
- Douglas Sladen – "The Inside Station"

== Prose ==
- Henry Lawson – "Crime in the Bush"

== Poetry ==
- Arthur H. Adams
  - "The Australian"
  - Maoriland and Other Verses
- E. J. Brady – The Ways of Many Waters
- Christopher Brennan
  - "Rondel" (a.k.a. "Towards the Source : 1894-97 : 21")
  - "Springtides Lost" (a.k.a. "Towards the Source : 1894-97 : 24")
- Victor J. Daley – "The Woods of Dandenong"
- George Essex Evans – "The Lion's Whelps"
- Mary Hannay Foott – "New Country"
- Mary Gilmore – "Sweethearts" (a.k.a. "Sweet-Heartin'")
- W. T. Goodge – Hits! Skits! and Jingles!
- James Hebblethwaite
  - "Perdita"
  - "Wanderers"
- Henry Lawson – "The Sliprails and the Spur"
- Francis MacNamara – "The Convict's Arrival"
- Jack Mathieu – "That Day at Boiling Downs"
- Dowell O'Reilly – "Sea-Grief"
- A. B. Paterson
  - "The City of Dreadful Thirst"
  - "Father Riley's Horse"
  - "The Lost Leichhardt"
- Roderic Quinn
  - The Hidden Tide
  - "Stars in the Sea"
- Agnes L. Storrie – Poems

== Drama ==
- Arnold Denham – The Kelly Gang

== Births ==
A list, ordered by date of birth (and, if the date is either unspecified or repeated, ordered alphabetically by surname) of births in 1899 of Australian literary figures, authors of written works or literature-related individuals follows, including year of death.

- 17 January
  - Peg Maltby, artist, book illustrator and children's writer (died 1984)
  - Nevil Shute, novelist (died 1960)
- 1 July – Edith Mary England, novelist and poet (died 1981)
- 9 August – P. L. Travers, novelist (died 1996)

== Deaths ==
A list, ordered by date of death (and, if the date is either unspecified or repeated, ordered alphabetically by surname) of deaths in 1899 of Australian literary figures, authors of written works or literature-related individuals follows, including year of birth.

- 9 September – Edward P. Vines, poet (born 1850)

== See also ==
- 1899 in Australia
- 1899 in literature
- 1899 in poetry
- List of years in Australian literature
- List of years in literature
