= Dad and Dave: On Our Selection =

- Theatrical release poster
- Directed by: George Whaley
- Written by: Geoffrey Atherden; George Whaley
- Based on: On Our Selection by Steele Rudd
- Produced by: Bruce Davey
- Starring: Leo McKern; Joan Sutherland; Geoffrey Rush; Noah Taylor; Essie Davis; Murray Bartlett; Ray Barrett; Celia Ireland
- Cinematography: Martin McGrath
- Music by: Peter Best (composer); John Williamson (theme song)
- Distributed by: Icon Entertainment International (though Roadshow Film Distributors
- Release date: 20 July 1995
- Country: Australia
- Language: English

Dad and Dave: On Our Selection is an Australian comedy film, based on the characters and writings of author Steele Rudd. It is set in late nineteenth century colonial Queensland, but largely filmed in Braidwood, New South Wales. The stories of the Rudds have been previously adapted for radio, television, and film (with this adaptation being a remake of the 1920 version). Geoffrey Atherden contributed to the screenplay with George Whaley, the latter of whom directed. This film featured numerous well-known Australian actors, such as Noah Taylor, Ray Barrett, Essie Davis, Murray Bartlett, Celia Ireland, Barry Otto, Nicholas Eadie, and future Oscar-winner Geoffrey Rush (reuniting with co-star Taylor in 1996's Shine) as the titular endearingly blundering son, Dave.

"Dad" and "Mum" Rudd were played, respectively, by veteran actor Leo McKern and opera singer Dame Joan Sutherland, in her only feature film role. The theme music was sung by Australian country musician John Williamson.

== Plot summary ==
The film portrays the Rudd family of 'Aussie battlers' in late 19th-century colonial Australia; Dad (McKern) and Mother (Sutherland) Rudd, and their hardworking but somewhat daffy son Dave (Rush). They take up a selection of land and attempt to farm it. The difficulties of the early colonial farming life are portrayed, with its ups and downs, humour and frustrations.

Finally tired of local corruption and the harshness of his life, Dad Rudd decides to run for State Parliament.

== Cast ==
- Leo McKern as Dad (Joseph) Rudd
- Joan Sutherland as Mother (Ellen) Rudd
- Geoffrey Rush as Dave Rudd
- Noah Taylor as Joe Rudd
- Ray Barrett as Dwyer
- Essie Davis as Kate Rudd
- Nicholas Eadie as Cyril Riley
- Barry Otto as J.P. Riley
- Murray Bartlett as Sandy Tayler
- Celia Ireland as Sarah Rudd
- Robert Menzies as Cranky Jack
- David Field as Dan
- Pat Bishop as Maude White
- John Gaden as Rev. McFarlane
- Peter Whitford as Mr. Todd
- Cathy Campbell as Lily White
- Bruce Venables as Petersen

== Reception ==
The movie was made to honour Australia's centenary of film and cinema. Despite a cast of well-known actors and actresses, it was not well received.

Rob Lowing, film critic for The Sydney Morning Herald rated the movie three stars out of four. Lowing described the film as "enormous fun" and praised the production values as "impeccable".

== Box office ==
Dad and Dave: On Our Selection grossed $1,222,051 at the box office in Australia.

== Home media ==
Dad and Dave: On Our Selection was released on DVD by Umbrella Entertainment in May 2006. The DVD is compatible with all region codes and includes special features such as the original theatrical trailer, unique Umbrella Entertainment trailers, a stills and poster gallery, TV spots, a behind the scenes making-of featurette and on-set footage and interviews with cast and crew.

The original soundtrack has been released twice on CD. First by EMI Records in 1995 with dialogue excerpts, and then reissued in 2002 in a limited Collector's Edition by Australian film music recording archivist, Philip Powers, on the 1M1 Records label. The re-issue was without dialogue and contained a 19-minute medley of the songs.

== See also ==
- Cinema of Australia
