= John Tighe Ryan =

Irish-Australian journalist and editor (1870–1922)

- Born: 1870; Milltown, Clonoulty, Tipperary, Ireland
- Died: 20 September 1922 (aged 51–52); St Vincent's Hospital, Sydney, Australia
- Occupations: Editor, Journalist, Anti-conscriptionist
- Known for: Editorship of The Catholic Press 1897-1922

John Tighe Ryan (1870 – 20 September 1922) was an Irish-Australian journalist, newspaper editor, and anti-conscriptionist.

== Early life ==
John Tighe Ryan was born in Milltown, Clonoulty, Tipperary, Ireland, in 1870.

He moved to Queensland, Australia, with his widowed mother, Margaret née Tighe, and five siblings, some years after the death of her husband Phillip Ryan in 1881. They lived at Ipswich, in the south of the state.

Nicknamed "Tighe", Ryan attended St Joseph's Christian Brothers' School, in Brisbane. He grew to medium height, with a slim wiry build, but had a commanding personality, and drew respect when he spoke.

== Career ==
After leaving school, Ryan worked at newspapers in Brisbane, and at The Queensland Times, in Ipswich.

He was a co-editor at The Antipodean, an illustrated annual, from 1892 to 1893, with George Essex Evans (editor) and Banjo Patterson (co-editor). That periodical published works by contemporary authors including Henry Lawson, Banjo Patterson, George Essex Evans and Robert Louis Stevenson, and political content, such as by Alfred Deakin about Federation, some of which content was actively sought by Ryan.

He later joined the Daily Telegraph in Sydney, and was the Australian representative for the Pall Mall Gazette and Westminster Gazette. About 1895 he became editor of The Gundagai Times.

In 1897, Ryan took on the chief editor role for The Catholic Press, two years after its inception, founded by Catholic priests, and he remained in that role until his sudden death twenty-five years later in 1922. "The Press" was a cheap alternative to The Freeman's Journal, selling at half the price.

As a "fearless and outspoken journalist" and editor, Ryan was well respected, and recognised internationally. He followed the stylistic lead of the original priest founders of the newspaper, and promoted the interests of the Irish Catholic and non-Catholic diaspora in Australia, supporting issues such as Irish Home Rule, the cause of the Irish uprising in Dublin, fairer distribution of wealth in Ireland, and also opposing the British' role in South Africa's second Boer War. It was said that: "Wherever and whenever Catholic rights, educational or civic, have been menaced, or, whenever the interests of Australian democracy have been imperilled, the enemies of both have had to reckon with Mr. Ryan."

Ryan took on a personally-felt battle in print against conscription during World War I, from 1916 onward. Prior to that he had been more willing to publish pro-conscription articles, such as speeches by the fourth Archbishop of Sydney, Michael Kelly, who was known for his piousness. Although Christians mainly believed the war to be necessary, and Australians in general were loyal to the British Empire, some Catholics opposed conscription and were "left cold" by the machinations of the Empire. Ryan's anti-conscription editorials included "Conscription: the racial and industrial suicide of Australia" and "Conscription is slavery". His influence saw the popularity and readership of The Catholic Press double in circulation around that time. As a leading Catholic layman, with connections to numerous public figures, his views appear to have strongly influenced lay-Catholic opinion of the day.

Ryan also supported the concept of Federation for Australia's states, and protection for local industries. His writings, through the medium of that popular "organ" The Catholic Press, supported the Labor party and its development in New South Wales in the early 20th century, facilitating unity among Catholics and Protestants working to secure workers' rights. However his stance favoured religion ahead of the Labor position, which was geared towards social reform, so that, despite partly similar views, he had disagreed in 1905 with Sydney's third Archbishop Patrick Francis Moran, who veered more towards socialism.

On a lighter note, Ryan is said to have helped bring the word "wowser" into common usage, referring to "a highly unpopular type of individual who saw sin in everything, even cigarettes and a glass of beer," or an antisocial and disruptive "lout", or puritanical and censorious person.

Following his death, the editor role of The Catholic Press was assumed by journalist Patrick Scott Cleary, who however lacked Ryan's "provocative brilliance" and his confidence in a democratic pluralist society.

== Personal life ==
Ryan had three sisters who became nuns. He never married himself, and resided with his mother until she died in 1908. His social life included prominent priests, politicians and authors.

Ryan may not have been especially physically hardy. It has been suggested that his health became worn down by the stress of opposing the pro-conscription movement, which was supported by The Freeman's Journal and by Archbishop Kelly.

On 20 September 1922, Ryan died from a cerebral haemorrhage, at St Vincent's Hospital, Sydney. He was 52 years old. Buried in Rookwood cemetery, his headstone, in the form of a Celtic Cross, was unveiled by the Right Reverend Monsignor J. P. Moynagh following the burial. Ryan was said to possess a "magnificent character", to never disappoint his friends, and to have been "a genuine born journalist, a genuine Catholic, and a most genuine Irishman".

The estate, valued at £4459, was donated to poorer schools in the Sydney archdiocese.
