= On Our Selection (disambiguation) =

On Our Selection is a series of stories written by Australian author Steele Rudd between 1899 and the early 1900s.

On Our Selection may also refer to any of a number of works based on the original stories:

- On Our Selection (1912 play)
- On Our Selection (1920 film)
- On Our Selection (1932 film)
- Dad and Dave: On Our Selection, a 1995 film
