= Crime in the Bush =

Essay by Henry Lawson

- Short story by Henry Lawson
- Country: Australia
- Language: English
- Genre(s): Essay

Publication
- Published in: The Bulletin
- Media type: print (magazine)
- Publication date: 11 February 1899

"Crime in the Bush" (1899) is a dramatic essay by the Australian writer Henry Lawson.

The essay was first published in the 11 February 1899 edition of The Bulletin magazine, and was subsequently reprinted in a number of Australian literary anthologies.

== Plot ==
Although generally considered, and indexed as a short story, this piece by Henry Lawson is more a rant about the isolated and terrible conditions experienced by Australian settlers in the bush: not seeing any non-family members for days or weeks at a time; working their children as slaves; and carrying grudges and slights for years that finally manifest into outright violence.

The final paragraph reads: "Mischief breeds mischief; malice, malice; and the tongues of the local hags applaud and chorus, and damn and exaggerate and lie, until the wretched hole is ripe for a 'horror.' Then the Horror comes."

== Publications ==
"Crime in the Bush" first appeared in The Bulletin magazine on 11 February 1899. It was subsequently published as follows:

- Southerly Vol. 25, No. 4 (1965)
- A Camp-Fire Yarn : Henry Lawson Compete Works 1885-1900 edited by Leonard Cronin, 1984
- Henry Lawson Recollections : A Selection of Autobiographical Works edited by Leonard Cronin, 1987
- The Macmillan Anthology of Australian Literature edited by Ken L. Goodwin and Alan Lawson (1990)

== Critical reception ==
Nikolett Sánta commented: "Margaret Nicholson describes [Henry Lawson] as a man whose "[...] vivid descriptions of the self-reliant bush folk of the century are legendary” and indeed, even if his descriptions of the bushman in the 'Crime in the Bush' do not draw the most flattering image of these people of the Australian wilderness, it still provides readers with a sad, albeit realistic reflection of the people living under those numbing and sometimes brutish conditions. The prevalence of the uneducated, intellectually underdeveloped bushman who lives far away from society and culture can be seen in other major Australian works as well, in A. B. ‘Banjo’ Paterson's (1864-1941) poems ('The Man from Snowy River' [1890], 'The Man from Ironbark' [1892]), and in Miles Franklin's novel, My Brilliant Career (1901)."

== See also ==
- 1899 in Australian literature
