= The Women of the West =

Poem written by George Essex Evans

- by George Essex Evans
- Written: 1901
- First published in: The Argus
- Country: Australia
- Language: English
- Publication date: 7 September 1901
- Preceded by: "Elands River"
- Followed by: "The World - Our Country"

Full text
- The Women of the West at Wikisource

The Women of the West is a poem by Australian poet George Essex Evans. It was first published in The Argus newspaper on 7 September 1901, and later in the poet's poetry collection The Secret Key and Other Verses (1906).

== Poem details ==
"This poem is dedicated to the pioneering women of the outback who left 'the pleasures of the city and faced the wilderness'. It was written to ensure that their sacrifice would not be forgotten. And what was this sacrifice? Not only did the 'red sun rob their beauty' and “the slow years steal the nameless grace', these women 'faced and fought the wilderness' and the man should be thankful. Evans realizes this and sees all the hard things that life in the bush brought to these women.

== Analysis ==
Reverend M. Lane, in The Catholic Press called this poem "the best-known verse of Essex Evans, who pays a well-deserved tribute to those who faced the wilderness, the everlasting sameness of the never-ending plains, and left behind the roar and rush and fever of the city for the slab-built hut or the tout in the wide, lone bush — the silent, 'han-shunned plans' of the land of the 'Never-never'."

== Further publications ==
- The Brisbane Courier, 14 September 1901
- The Queenslander, 21 September 1901
- The North Queensland Register, 23 September 1901
- The Secret Key and Other Verses by George Essex Evans (1906)
- An Anthology of Australian Verse edited by Bertram Stevens (1907)
- The Golden Treasury of Australian Verse edited by Bertram Stevens (1909)
- The Daily Mail, 10 August 1924
- A Book of Queensland Verse edited by J. J. Stable, and A.E.M. Kirwood (1924)
- Selections from the Australian Poets edited by Bertram Stevens (1925)* Australian Bush Songs and Ballads edited by Will Lawson (1944)
- Favourite Australian Poems edited by Ian Mudie (1963)
- From the Ballads to Brennan edited by T. Inglis Moore, Angus and Robertson, 1964
- Bards in the Wilderness : Australian Colonial Poetry to 1920 edited by Adrian Mitchell and Brian Elliott, Nelson, 1970
- Along the Western Road: Bush Stories and Ballads (1981)
- This Australia, Spring 1982
- A Treasury of Colonial Poetry (1982)
- The Illustrated Treasury of Australian Verse compiled by Beatrice Davis (1984)
- My Country: Australian Poetry and Short Stories, Two Hundred Years edited by Leonie Kramer (1985)
- A Treasury of Bush Verse edited by G. A. Wilkes, Angus and Robertson, 1991
- The Penguin Book of 19th Century Australian Literature edited by Michael Ackland (1993)
- The Romance of the Stockman: The Lore, Legend and Literature of Australia's Outback Heroes (1993)
- The Penguin Book of Australian Ballads edited by Elizabeth Webby and Philip Butterss (1993)
- The Illustrated Treasury of Australian Verse compiled by Beatrice Davis (1996)
- Classic Australian Verse edited by Maggie Pinkney (2001)
- Our Country: Classic Australian Poetry: From the Colonial Ballads to Paterson & Lawson edited by Michael Cook (2004)
- The Book of Australian Popular Rhymed Verse: A Classic Collection of Entertaining and Recitable Poems and Verse: From Henry Lawson to Barry Humphries edited by Jim Haynes (2008)

== See also ==
- 1901 in poetry
- 1901 in literature
- 1901 in Australian literature
- Australian literature
