= Dot Simons =

New Zealand sportswoman, sports journalist, and writer

Dorothy Edith Simons OBE (née Nash, 16 February 1912 – 13 September 1996) was a notable New Zealand sportswoman, sports journalist and writer. She was born in Greymouth, New Zealand, in 1912.

She was appointed an Officer of the Order of the British Empire, for services to youth and sport, in the 1974 New Year Honours.
