= Merv Corner =

Merv Corner CBE MC JP
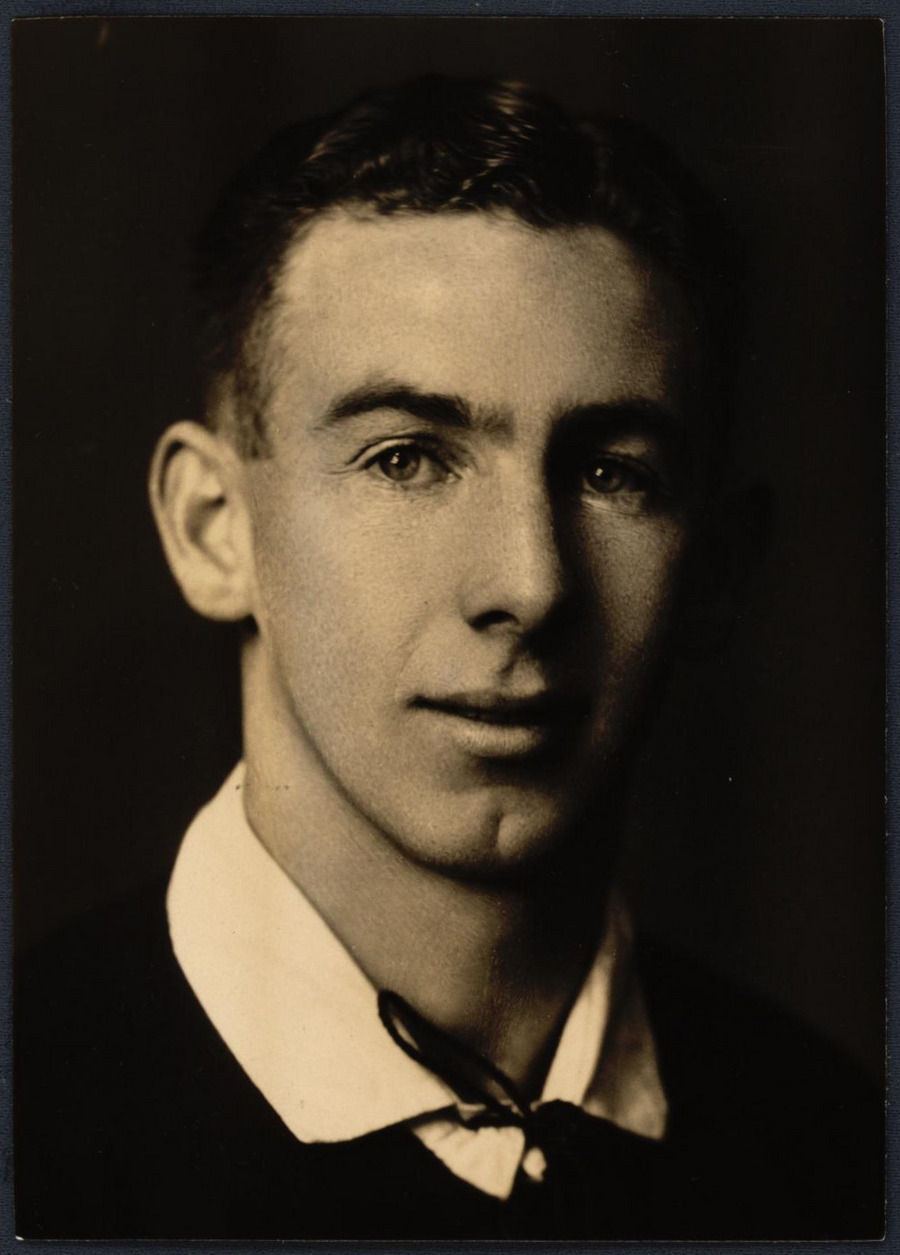
- Corner in 1935
- Born: Mervyn Miles Nelson Corner; 5 July 1908 Auckland, New Zealand
- Died: 3 February 1992 (aged 83) Auckland, New Zealand
- Height: 1.65 m (5 ft 5 in)
- Weight: 58 kg (128 lb)
- School: Auckland Grammar School
- Occupation: Banking executive

Rugby union career
- Position: Halfback
Provincial / State sides
Years	Team	Apps	(Points)
1929–35	Auckland		
International career
Years	Team	Apps	(Points)
1930–36	New Zealand	6	(0)

Mervyn Miles Nelson Corner CBE MC JP (5 July 1908 – 3 February 1992) was a New Zealand rugby union player, sporting administrator, and bank executive.

== Biography ==
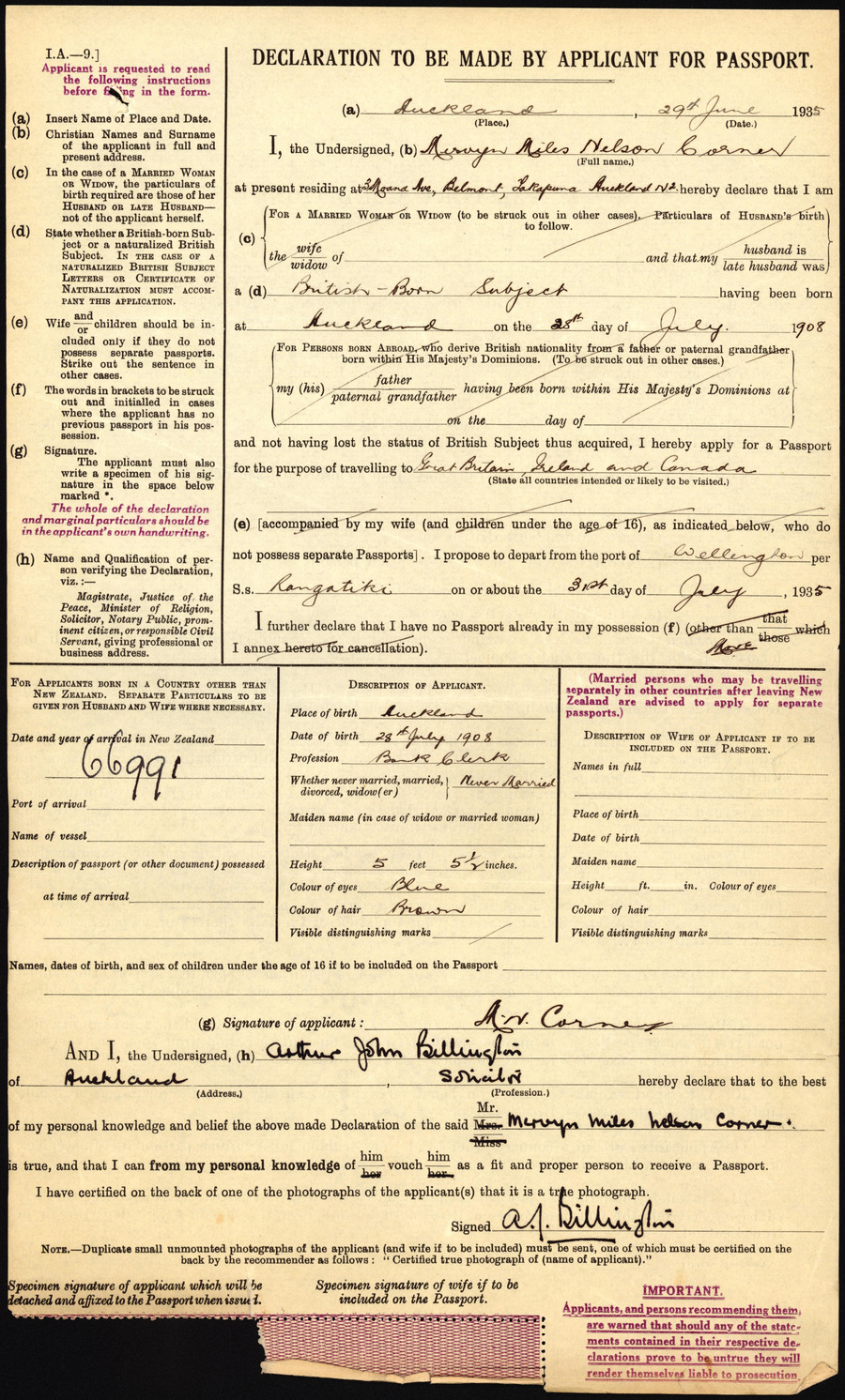
Mervyn Miles Nelson Corner passport application (1935)

Born in Auckland in 1908, Corner was educated at Auckland Grammar School. In 1938 he married Ira May Ardley in the Auckland suburb of Devonport, and the couple went on to have three children: Peter Mervyn Corner, Joan Ira (Reeves), and Pamela Joyce (Donnelly).

A rugby union halfback, Corner represented Auckland at a provincial level, and was a member of the New Zealand national side, the All Blacks, from 1930 to 1936. He played 25 matches for the All Blacks including six internationals, and captained the team in one game, against London Counties on the 1935–36 tour of Britain, Ireland and Canada.

Corner saw active service during World War II. In January 1942 he was appointed a second lieutenant in the New Zealand Infantry, and in December 1944, when he held the rank of captain, he was awarded the Military Cross in recognition of gallant and distinguished services in the southwest Pacific. He later reached the rank of lieutenant colonel. He served as a coast watcher in the Gilbert and Ellice Islands and also as commanding officer of the 1st Battalion Fiji Infantry Regiment.
Corner was under the command of the US army in Fiji and was awarded the Purple Heart for bravery in surviving a mortar attack that deafened him in his right ear. His family believe that he was one of two non-American militia to be awarded this honour in WWII.

Corner was prominent as a sporting administrator, serving as a member of the New Zealand Racing Authority for 12 years, the Eden Park Trust Board and the Totalisator Agency Board, also for 12 years. He was also president of the Auckland Trotting Club, and owned a number of standardbred racehorses with his friend and former All Black Arthur Knight. Corner served as president of the New Zealand Barbarians Rugby Football Club between 1958 and 1959, and president of the Auckland Rugby Football Union from 1959 to 1961. He also served as an Auckland and All Blacks selector.

Outside of sports, Corner started working at the Auckland Savings Bank after leaving school, rising to become general manager from 1968 to 1973, when he retired. He continued to be involved in public life, serving as chair of the Transport Improvement Committee and the Fishing Industry Board, and as a member of the New Zealand Film Commission from 1977 to 1986. He was also a member of the board of the Museum of Transport and Technology and was appointed as a justice of the peace in 1968.

In the 1974 New Year Honours, Corner was appointed an Officer of the Order of the British Empire, for services to the community, and he was promoted to Commander of the same order in the 1981 Queen's Birthday Honours, for services to the New Zealand fishing industry and the community. He was awarded the Queen Elizabeth II Silver Jubilee Medal in 1977.

Corner died in Auckland on 3 February 1992.
