= Catholic Press =

Australian periodical from 1895 to 1942

The Catholic Press
- Type: Weekly newspaper
- Format: Tabloid
- Founded: 9 November 1895
- Ceased publication: 26 February 1942
- Headquarters: Sydney
- Free online archives: Trove/NLA

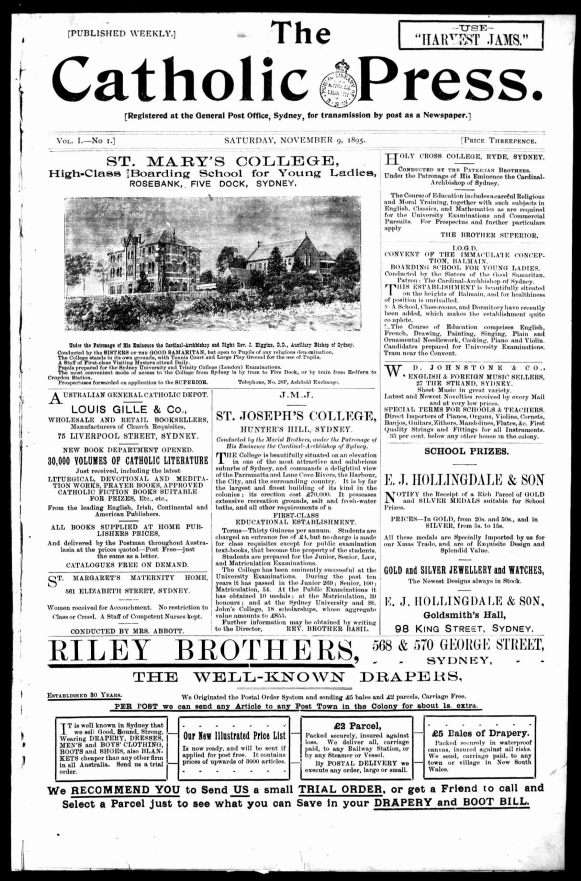
The Catholic Press, 9 November 1895

The Catholic Press was a Sydney-based newspaper that was first published on 9 November 1895 and ran until 26 February 1942, after which it was amalgamated with the Catholic Freeman's Journal and reborn as The Catholic Weekly.

== History ==
Sydney clergy had heeded the urgings of Pope Leo XIII, who called for Catholic newspapers to "counteract the appalling efforts of torrents of infidel filth that deluge the homes of our people, that desecrate the sacred sanctuary of family life, that poison the fountain-springs of society", and sought to establish a second Catholic newspaper. Initially costing threepence an issue, the newspaper was seen as a cheaper alternative to The Freeman’s Journal, which cost sixpence. Fr. Bunbury was the interim editor until first appointed editor, John F. Perrin, arrived from New Zealand in December 1895. Perrin had been editor of the New Zealand Tablet and a journalist in New Zealand for 20 years. John Tighe Ryan was the editor from 1897. The Catholic Press and Australian Workers' Union newspaper The Worker were the only two newspapers in Australia to oppose conscription in 1916-17, and also supported home rule for Ireland after 1916. Ryan's editorial stance against conscription was contrary to the views of Michael Kelly, Archbishop of Sydney, yet the newspaper printed many of Kelly's sermons supporting conscription and the war. The paper's circulation in 1917 was double that of 1916 and Ryan remained editor until he died in 1922.

Archbishop Kelly and his successor Cardinal Norman Thomas Gilroy preferred there to be only one Catholic newspaper in Sydney and so, in 1942, the Catholic Press was amalgamated, after almost 50 years' publication, with the Freeman's Journal to become the Catholic Weekly.

== Digitisation ==
The newspaper has been digitised as part of the Australian Newspapers Digitisation Program, a project hosted by the National Library of Australia.

== See also ==
- List of newspapers in New South Wales
- List of newspapers in Australia
