= Betty the Scribe =

1906 young adult novel by Lilian Turner

- Author: Lilian Turner
- Language: English
- Genre: Young adult novel
- Publisher: Ward, Lock
- Publication date: 1906
- Publication place: Australia
- Media type: Print
- Pages: 320

Betty the Scribe (1906) is a young adult novel by Australian author Lilian Turner. It was originally serialised in The Leader newspaper in 24 weekly instalments, from 16 June 1906 to 24 November 1906, under the title Betty of the Wilderness. It was subsequently published later in 1906 in both London and Melbourne by Ward, Lock publishers.

== Synopsis ==
A young motherless girl, Betty Bruce, leaves home to seek a literary career in Sydney, Australia. There she takes a job as the social reporter for a city newspaper. But her hard work only leads to a breakdown in her health and she has to struggle to get her career back on track.

== Critical reception ==
A review in The Sydney Mail and New South Wales Advertiser noted that Betty's "literary struggles, her hopefulness, and energy, make entertaining reading."

After comparing the author's work with that of her sister, Ethel Turner, and finding it to be rather an imitation, a review in The Register concluded that "Miss Lilian Turner has been more successful in her efforts to delineate character in the adolescent stage of development; and, as the abrupt ending of the present story suggests the possibility of a sequel, her next book may provide ampler scope for analytical and psychological studies of extremely interesting personalities."

== Publication history ==
After the novel's initial serialisation in The Leader newspaper in Melbourne, Australia, the novel was published by Ward, Lock, and then reprinted as follows:

- 1907, Saalfield Publishing, USA
- 1907, C.E. Fritzes Bokforlags Aktiebolag, Sweden
- 1907, Lodewijk Opdebeek, Netherlands
- 1923, Ward, Lock, Australia and UK
- 1927, Saalfield Publishing, USA

== Note ==
- The full text of the 1927 US edition is available on the Internet Archive.

== See also ==
- 1906 in Australian literature
