= Henry Joseph Rudolph =

Watch repairer, musician, choirmaster, music director

Henry Joseph Rudolph MBE (1902–1984) was a notable New Zealand watch repairer, musician, choirmaster and music director. He was born in London, England, in 1902.

In the 1974 New Year Honours, Rudolph was appointed a Member of the Order of the British Empire, for services to music and welfare.
