= 1974 New Year Honours (New Zealand) =

Annual awards for New Zealanders

The 1974 New Year Honours in New Zealand were appointments by Elizabeth II on the advice of the New Zealand government to various orders and honours to reward and highlight good works by New Zealanders. The awards celebrated the passing of 1973 and the beginning of 1974, and were announced on 1 January 1974.

The recipients of honours are displayed here as they were styled before their new honour.

== Order of the Bath ==
=== Companion (CB) ===
Military division

- Air Vice Marshal Douglas Fitzclarence St George CBE DFC AFC – Chief of Air Staff.

== Order of Saint Michael and Saint George ==
=== Knight Commander (KCMG) ===
- The Honourable Robert Mafeking Macfarlane CMG. For long and valuable services in Parliament and to the City of Christchurch.
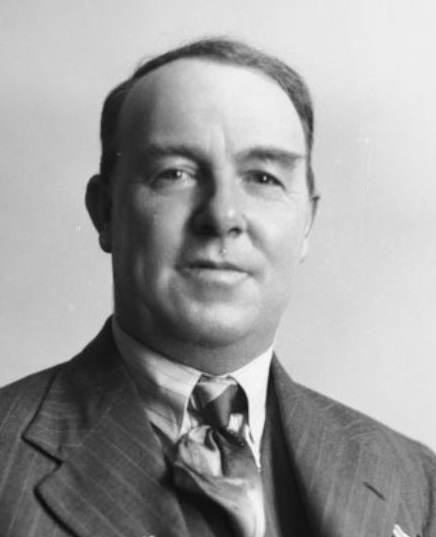
Sir Robert Macfarlane

=== Companion (CMG) ===
- Ormond Hutchinson – of Christchurch. For services to the community.
- Lewis Nathan Ross – of Auckland. For services to commerce.
- Kenneth Leslie Sandford – chairman of the Accident Compensation Commission.
- Professor Emeritus Frederick Lloyd Whitfeld Wood. For services to scholarship and Victoria University of Wellington.

== Order of the British Empire ==
=== Knight Commander (KBE) ===
Civil division

- The Honourable Albert Royle Henry – Premier of the Cook Islands. (Note: Knighthood revoked in 1980)
- William Harold Angus Sharp QPM – Commissioner of Police, New Zealand Police.

Military division

- Lieutenant General Richard James Holden Webb CB CBE – Chief of Defence Staff, New Zealand Armed Forces.
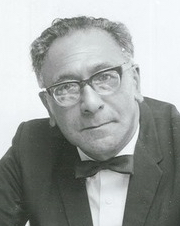
Albert Henry

=== Commander (CBE) ===
Civil division

- The Reverend Canon Colin Douglas Charles Caswell OBE – of Auckland; lately director, Selwyn Foundation.
- The Reverend Canon Charles Elliot Fox MBE – of Waipukurau. For humanitarian services, particularly in the Solomon Islands.
- James Henderson Macky – lately Commissioner of Works.
- Joseph de Valley McManemin JP – of Auckland. For services to sport and the community.
- Douglas Augustine Patterson MBE – of Wellington. For services to aviation.
- Antonio Valli Prendiville – of Dunedin. For services to mining.
- Haratua Rogers – of Rotorua. For services to Māoritanga and the community.
- The Reverend Father Francis Patrick Joseph Wall – of Taranaki. For services to the community.
- Frederick Miles Warren – of Christchurch. For services to architecture.

Military division

- Major-General Robin Hugh Ferguson Holloway OBE – Deputy Chief of the General Staff.
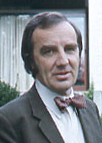
Miles Warren

=== Officer (OBE) ===
Civil division

- Robert Leslie Archibald – of Wellington. For services to local government.
- Professor Valentine Jackson Chapman – University of Auckland. For academic and public services.
- Mervyn Miles Nelson Corner MC JP – of Auckland. For services to the community.
- Alfred Ginsberg – veterinary adviser, New Zealand High Commission in London.
- Lionel Rexford Hetherington – of Waihi. For services to medicine and the community.
- John Patrick Kennedy – of Dunedin. For services to journalism.
- James McDonald JP – of Lower Hutt. For services to the community
- Thomas Bayne McDonald JP – of Hawke's Bay. For services to winemaking.
- Charles James Leonard Matheson – of Auckland. For services to youth, particularly Boystown.
- Edward James Briton Matthews JP – of Raumati South. For services to local government and organisations.
- Robert Frederick Moody MBE – of Auckland. For services to medicine.
- Eru Moka Pou – of Kaikohe. For services to the community, particularly to the Māori people.
- Dorothy Edith Simons – of Auckland. For services to youth and sport.
- Amy Victoria Castle Slack – of Auckland. For services to the Parent Teacher movement.
- Joseph Edward Story – of Taupō. For services to local government.
- Robert Charles Stuart – of Wellington. For services to agriculture and sport.
- The Reverend Te Napi Tute Wehi Wehi Waaka – of Hāwera. For services to Māori welfare.

Military division

- Lieutenant Colonel John Airth Mace MBE – New Zealand Defence Liaison Staff, New Zealand High Commission, Canberra.
- Wing Commander Colin Morris Hanson – Royal New Zealand Air Force.
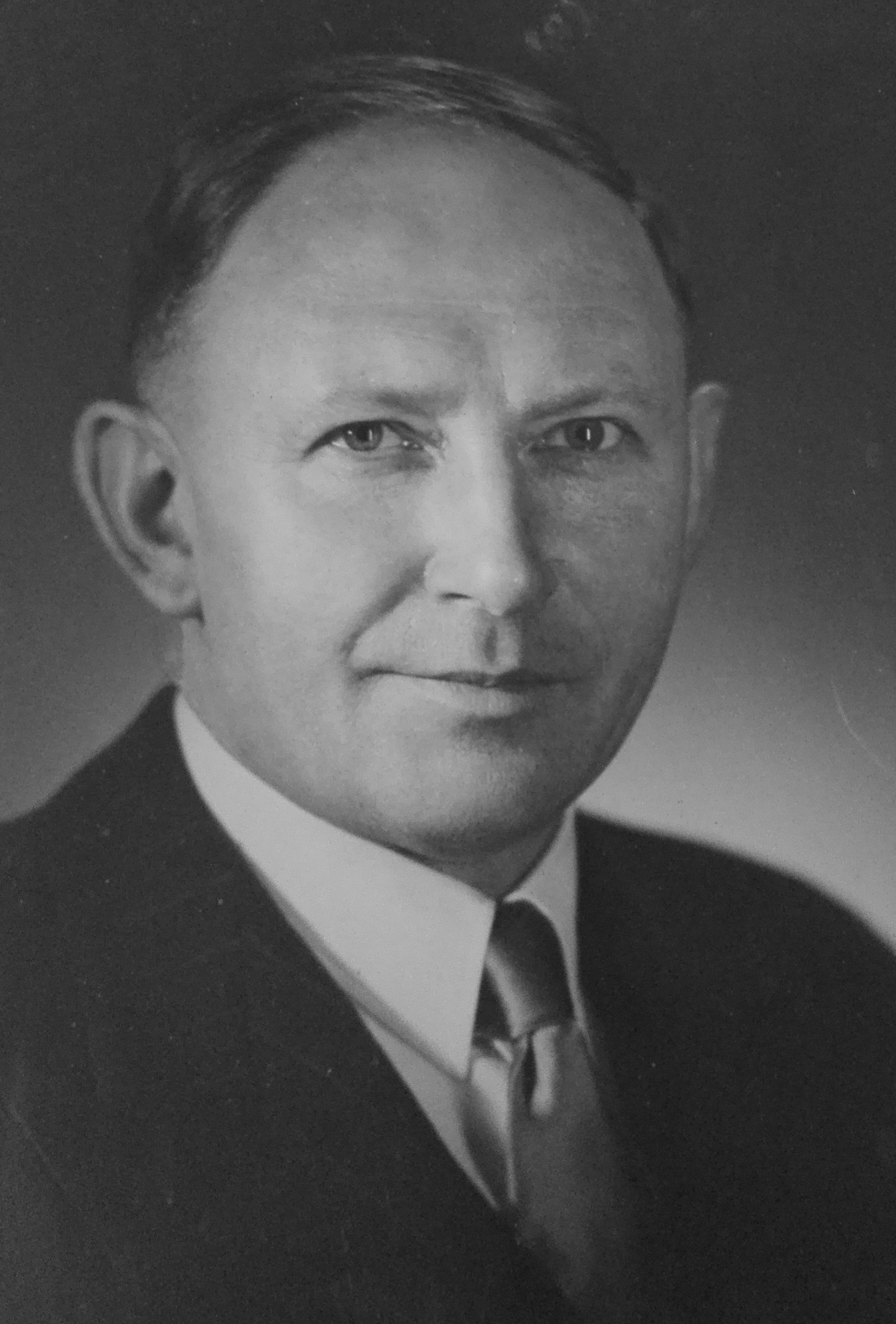
Bob Archibald

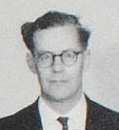
Val Chapman

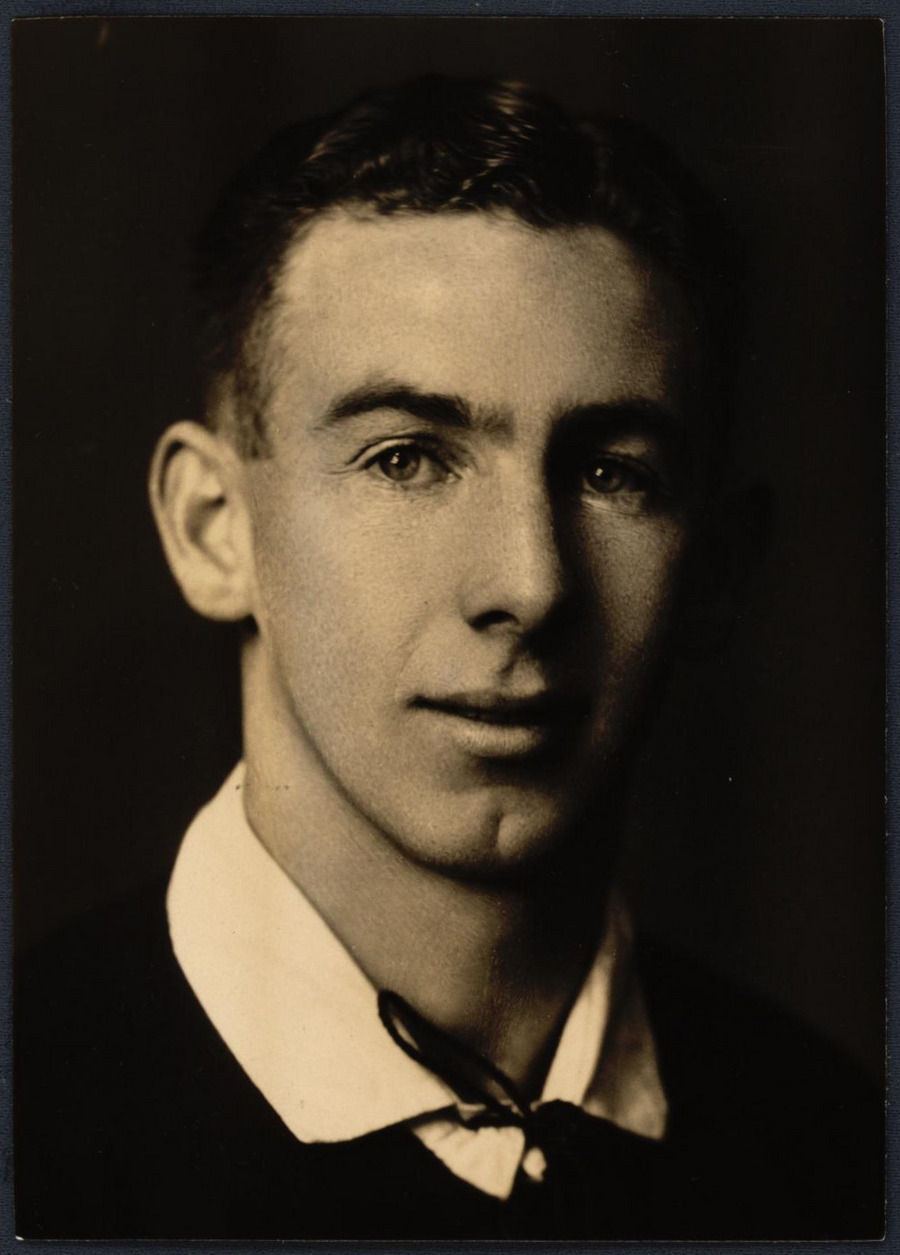
Merv Corner

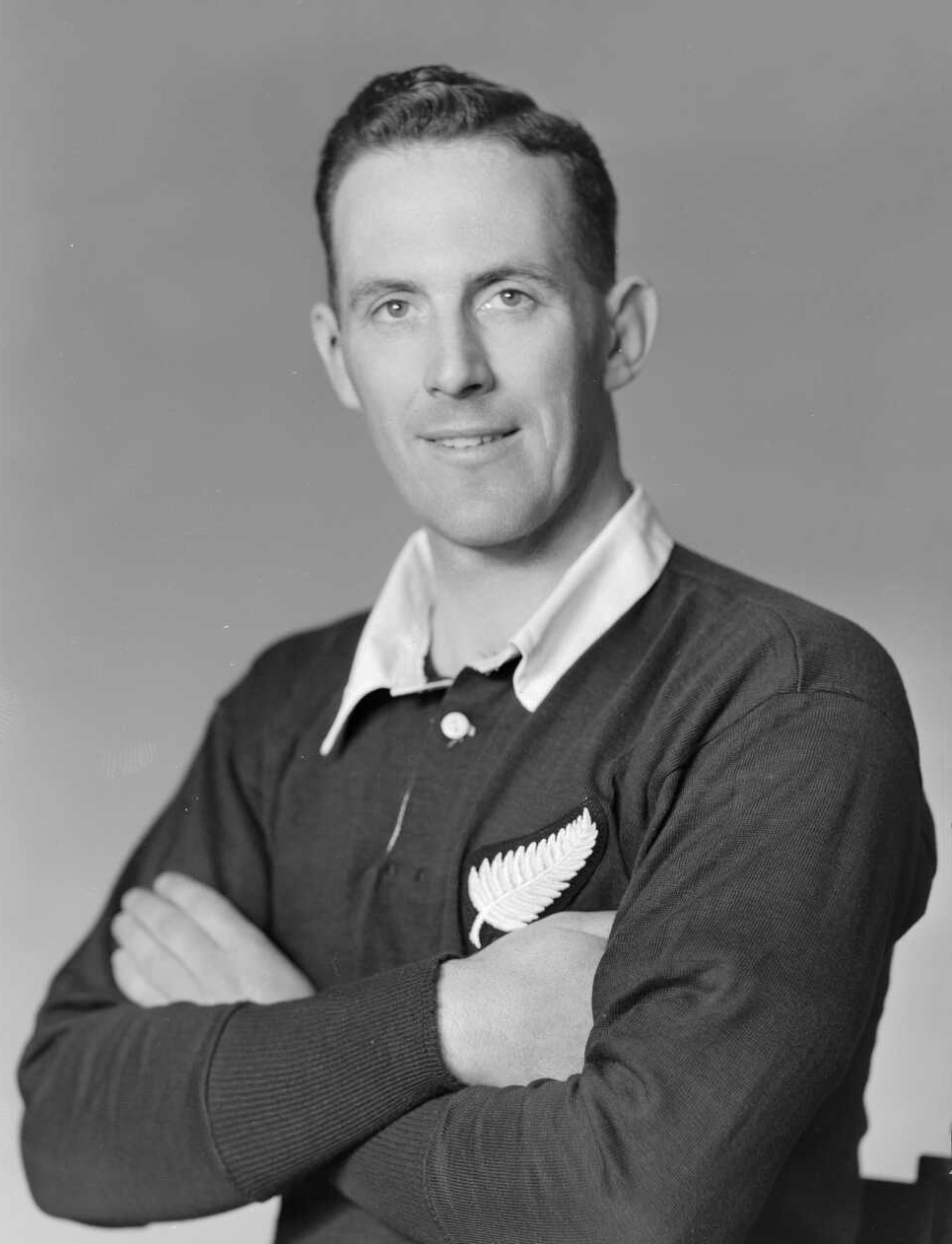
Bob Stuart

=== Member (MBE) ===
Civil division

- Kathleen Alison – bursar, University of Auckland.
- Ivan George Clement Anderson – mayor of Cromwell.
- Arthur William Boon – of Auckland; lieutenant colonel, Salvation Army.
- Daphne Frances Byrne – of Dunedin. For services to the community.
- Mark Vincent Comber – of New Plymouth. For services to the community.
- Charles Armistice Corlett – of Auckland. For services to the community.
- Nina Kathrine Dallinger JP – of Cambridge. For services to the community.
- Harry Delamere Barter Dansey – of Auckland. For services to journalism and the community.
- Irene Lucy Firman JP – of Geraldine. For services to the community.
- Hugh Donald Gillies – of Dunedin. For services to life saving.
- William Richard Hawkey – of Christchurch. For services to music.
- Raymond Joseph Wadman Jacobs – lately chief preparator, Canterbury Museum.
- Rita Mary King – of Wellington. For services to women.
- Eric James Kirk. For services to Wanganui Harbour Board.
- Ronald James McLean JP – of Invercargill. For services to the community.
- Betty Hamilton McPhail – of Wellington. For services in the field of social welfare.
- Eruera Riini Manuera JP – of Whakatāne. For services to the Māori people.
- David Hamilton Mason – of Dunedin. For services to sport.
- Kitty May Honour Mildenhall JP – of Lower Hutt. For services to the community.
- Noel Selwyn Murray JP – of Auckland. For services to the community.
- Patrick Joseph O'Regan – of Inangahua Junction. For services to local government.
- Nellie Ina Plunkett (Sister Oliver) – of Christchurch. For services to psychiatric nursing.
- Robert Gordon Robinson – of Christchurch. For services to the potato industry.
- Henry Joseph Rudolph – of Wellington. For services to music and welfare.
- Jon Charles Trimmer – of Wellington. For services to ballet.
- John Cuthbert Wishart JP – of Kaiara, Chatham Islands. For public services.

Military division

- Warrant Marine Engineering Artificer Alexander John Kildare – Royal New Zealand Navy.
- Lieutenant Leonard Anthony Mangos – Royal New Zealand Navy.
- Major Allan Olaf Bloomfield ED – Royal New Zealand Infantry Regiment (Territorial Force).
- Warrant Officer First Class Matthew Harawira Edwards – Royal New Zealand Armoured Corps (Regular Force).
- Warrant Officer Second Class Ronald Clifford Spraggs – Royal Regiment of New Zealand Artillery (Territorial Force).
- Major Melva Beatrice Walker – New Zealand Women's Royal Army Corps (Regular Force) (now retired).
- Squadron Leader (now temporary Wing Commander) Peter Raymond Adamson – Royal New Zealand Air Force.
- Temporary Flight Lieutenant Brian John Germain – Royal New Zealand Air Force
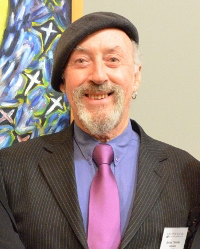
Jon Trimmer

== Companion of the Imperial Service Order (ISO) ==
- Ronald Johnson – supervisor, class III, New Zealand Post Office.

== British Empire Medal (BEM) ==
Civil division

- Alfred John Hesketh Allen JP – of Levin. For services to local government.
- Daphne May Barkman – of Dunedin. For services to the community.
- Cranleigh Harper Barton – of Christchurch. For his philanthropic services.
- George Joseph Brady JP – of Christchurch. For services to the trade union movement.
- Lawrence William Brennan JP – of Ōpunake. For services to the community.
- Ludlow Ellison Brooker – of Wellington. For services to rowing.
- Beth Isabel Fryer – of Oamaru. For services to the community.
- Daniel Gough – of Auckland. For services to the community.
- Emma Louise Hamel – of Kaiapoi. For services to the community.
- Catherine May Jones – of Invercargill. For services to music.
- Constance Lois Kerslake – of Wainuiomata. For services to the community.
- Eileen Mary Kingston JP – of Palmerston North. For services to the community.
- Basil George Mellor – of Hamilton. For services to the community.
- Rangimahora Reihana Mete – of Foxton. For services to Māori culture.
- William John Overton – of Dunedin. For services to the community.
- Olive Margaret Rayner – of Nelson. For services to the sick.
- Blanche Rhodes – of Dunedin. For services to the community.
- Adam Russell Ross – of Bluff. For services to medicine and the community.
- Ivy Mearle Shaw – of Hastings. For services to nursing and the community.
- Leonard Archibald Stuart – of Christchurch, For services to rugby league football.
- Percy Trebilcock – of Thames. For services to the community.
- Patrick Francis Ward – of Greytown. For services to the community.

Military division

- Temporary Warrant Officer Jennifer Clare O'Donnell – Women's Royal New Zealand Naval Service.
- Staff Sergeant (now temporary Warrant Officer Second Class) Ernest Mathew Dix – Royal New Zealand Electrical and Mechanical Engineers (Regular Force).
- Flight Sergeant Leslie Harrison – Royal New Zealand Air Force.
- Flight Sergeant Edward Ernest Morton – Royal New Zealand Air Force.
- Flight Sergeant John Francis Walsh – Royal New Zealand Air Force.

== Royal Red Cross ==
=== Member (RRC) ===
- Matron Ata Tamaki – Royal New Zealand Nursing Corps.

== Air Force Cross (AFC) ==
- Flight Lieutenant Graham Robert Lloyd – Royal New Zealand Air Force.

== Queen's Fire Service Medal (QFSM) ==
- George Mortimer MacGregor – foreman, Richmond Volunteer Fire Brigade.
- Eric Merriman Morris – chief fire officer, Balclutha Volunteer Fire Brigade.
- Lloyd Foster Wilson – chief fire officer, Auckland Metropolitan Fire Brigade.

== Queen's Police Medal (QPM) ==
- Allen David Knight – constable, New Zealand Police.
- James Wilfred McGuire – chief inspector, New Zealand Police.
