= The Secret Key and Other Verses =

Poetry collection by George Essex Evans

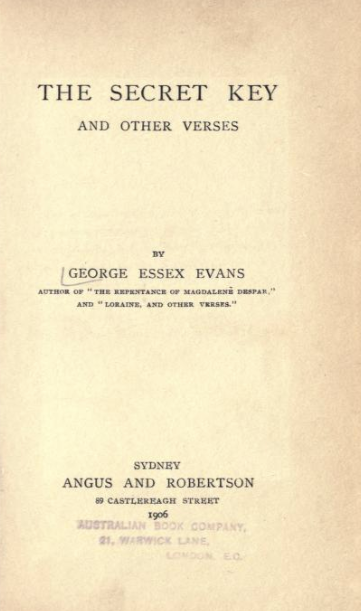
- Title page for The Secret Key and Other Verses (1906)
- Author: George Essex Evans
- Language: English
- Genre: Poetry collection
- Publisher: Angus and Robertson
- Publication date: 1906
- Publication place: Australia
- Media type: Print
- Pages: 204 pp
- Preceded by: The Sword of Pain
- Followed by: Kara, and Other Verses

The Secret Key and Other Verses (1906) is the fourth collection of poems by Australian poet George Essex Evans. It was released in hardback by Angus and Robertson in 1906, and features the poems "The Women of the West", "Ode for Commonwealth Day", and "Loraine".

The collection consists of 61 poems from a variety of sources. The poet notes in the original edition: "Some of these verses are taken from Loraine; many others, including the title piece and 'The Commonwealth Ode', have not previously appeared in book form. For permission to include such later verses the author is indebted to the proprietors of The Bulletin, Argus, Age, Australasian, Sydney Morning Herald, Courier, Queenslander, Toowoomba Chronicle, and Darling Downs Gazette."

== Contents ==
- "The Secret Key"
- "An Australian Symphony"
- "The Women of the West"
- "Ode for Commonwealth Day"
- "The Nation Builders"
- "On the Plains"
- "A Federal Song"
- "A Nocturne"
- "The Dream Star"
- "The Song of Life!"
- "The Lion's Whelps"
- "The Sword of Pain"
- "A Pastoral"
- "Lux in Tenebris"
- "The Song of Gracia"
- "Ad Astra"
- "The Grey Road"
- "But the Greatest of These is Charity"
- "Auri Sacra Fames"
- "The Spirit of Poetry"
- "Brunton Stephens"
- "Victoria : In Memoriam"
- "The Crown of Empire"
- "The Irish Dead : In Memory"
- "Elands River"
- "At the Base Hospital"
- "The Wayfarers"
- "Cymru"
- "To a Bigot"
- "Kara"
- "Out of the Silence"
- "Altiora Peto"
- "The Average Man"
- "A Commonplace Song"
- "The Wheels of the System"
- "By the Sea"
- "The Two Goblets"
- "The Doves of Venus"
- "Ode to the Philistines"
- "A Grave by the Sea"
- "The Land of the Dawning"
- "The Splendour and the Curse of Song"
- "Failure"
- "The Dead Democrat"
- "Toowoomba"
- "A Vision of Christ"
- "The Plains"
- "The Master"
- "In Collins Street"
- "In a Garden"
- "Welcome"
- "William Henry Groom Vale"
- "Australia"
- "John Farrell"
- "To the Unknown God"
- "Riches"
- "Thomas Joseph Byrnes"
- "Adrift : A Brisbane River Reverie"
- "Seddon"
- "Morning Land"
- "Loraine"

== Critical reception ==
A reviewer in The Australian Town and Country Journal found: "This book contains about sixty pieces all in the best style of the poet, and of these the Commonwealth Ode (which was awarded the fifty guinea prize by the Commonwealth Government), and about twenty other poems have not hitherto appeared in book form. This book should determine George Essex Evans's place in Australian literature up to the present time, and though the writer believes that the poet's great work has yet to be done, there is in "The Secret Key and Other Verses" sufficient to enshrine him in the hearts of all lovers of literature, to say nothing of the lovers of Australian literature. Evans would prefer to be judged on the common plane of letters, for letters in the wider sense have no restricting ambit of parish or continent."

== See also ==
- Full text of The Secret Key and Other Verses
- 1906 in Australian literature
- 1906 in poetry
