= John Kennedy (journalist) =

New Zealand journalist

John Patrick Kennedy OBE (7 June 1926 – 20 March 1994) was a New Zealand Catholic journalist who served as the editor of the weekly Catholic newspaper The New Zealand Tablet from 1967 to 1989.

== Biography ==
Born in Methven, Canterbury, Kennedy was educated at St Bede's College and at the University of Canterbury in Christchurch. He also worked as a journalist for several newspapers including the Christchurch Star-Sun and the Melbourne-based The Herald, before returning to New Zealand to become the editor of The Tablet in Dunedin. During his work as a journalist, he won several awards including the Cowan Memorial Prize for Good Journalism in 1947 and the Kemsley Empire Scholarship for Journalism in 1950. In the 1974 New Year Honours, Kennedy was appointed an Officer of the Order of the British Empire, for services to journalism. In 1981 he published a book entitled "Straight from The Shoulder" about developments in New Zealand society, broadcasting and politics. Kennedy was known for his socially-conservative stance on issues like abortion. During his career as editor of Tablet, he also had a close friendship with Prime Minister Robert Muldoon and the Society for the Protection of Unborn Children president Des Dalgety. During the Muldoon era, The Tablet adopted a pro-Muldoonist editorial standpoint and Muldoon himself contributed several articles. Muldoon himself supported The Tablet's position on private schools.

Kennedy was also anti-Communist and was critical of Prime Minister David Lange's anti-nuclear policies, which he saw as weakening the ANZUS alliance and benefiting the Soviet Union. According to peace activist Maire Leadbeater, Kennedy passed information on left-wing groups like the Philippines Solidarity Group to the New Zealand Security Intelligence Service, the country's main domestic intelligence agency.

Kennedy died on 20 March 1994. Following Kennedy's death, the Tablet struggled to maintain the level of support it had during his editorship. The newspaper ceased publication in April 1996.

Kennedy married Colleen McAleer. They had seven children together.
