= Leonard Cronin =

Journalist, editor, publisher (1900–1976)

Leonard John Cronin
- Born: 16 November 1900; Aramoho, Whanganui, New Zealand
- Died: 1 November 1976 (aged 75)
- Occupations: Journalist, editor
- Known for: Founder of Students' Digest (political and economic journal)

Leonard John Cronin (16 November 1900 – 1 November 1976) was a New Zealand journalist, editor and founder of the Students' Digest, monthly political and economic journal. He was born in Aramoho, Wanganui, New Zealand on 16 November 1900.

In 1916 Cronin started his career as a cadet journalist for the Patea and Waverley Press. Between 1925 and 1930 he worked as a parliamentary reporter for the New Zealand Times and the Auckland Sun. Cronin was known for his campaigns for stricter censorship of films and books. He also expressed his views on New Zealand politics and international affairs when working as an editor for the Catholic newspaper, the New Zealand Tablet until 1937.
