= Selection (Australian history) =

Process of acquiring farming land in Australia

Selection is the act of choosing and acquiring a subdivided tract of land for farming purposes in Australia. A selection is also descriptive of the plot of land that was selected. The term derived from "free selection before survey" of crown land in some Australian colonies under land legislation introduced in the 1860s. These acts were intended to encourage closer settlement, based on intensive agriculture, such as wheat-growing, rather than extensive agriculture, such as wool production. Selectors often came into conflict with squatters, who already occupied the land and often managed to circumvent the law.

== New South Wales ==
The Robertson Land Acts allowed those with limited means to acquire land. With the stated intention of encouraging closer settlement and fairer allocation of land by allowing 'free selection before survey', the Land Acts legislation was passed in 1861. The relevant acts were named the Crown Lands Alienation Act and Crown Lands Occupation Act. The application of the legislation was delayed until 1866 in inland areas such as the Riverina where existing squatting leases were still to run their course. In any case severe drought in the Riverina in the late 1860s initially discouraged selection in areas except those close to established townships. Selection activity increased with more favourable seasons in the early 1870s.

Both selectors and squatters used the broad framework of the Land Acts to maximise their advantages in the ensuing scramble for land. There was a general manipulation of the system by squatters, selectors and profiteers alike. The legislation secured access to the squatter's land for the selector, but thereafter effectively left him to fend for himself. Amendments passed in 1875 sought to remedy some of the abuses perpetrated under the original selection legislation.

However discontent was rife and a political shift in the early 1880s saw the setting up of a commission to inquire into the effects of the land legislation. The Morris and Ranken committee of inquiry, which reported in 1883, found that the number of homesteads established was a small percentage of the applications for selections under the Act, especially in areas of low rainfall such as the Riverina and the lower Darling River. The greater number of selections were made by squatters or their agents, or by selectors unable to establish themselves or who sought to gain by re-sale. The gaining of lands through agents—often old people who willed the land to the squatter—was known as dummying. The Crown Lands Act of 1884, introduced in the wake of the Morris-Ranken inquiry, sought to compromise between the integrity of the large pastoral leaseholds and the political requirements of equality of land availability and closer settlement patterns. The Act divided pastoral runs into Leasehold Areas (held under short-term leases) and Resumed Areas (available for settlement as smaller homestead leases) and allowed for the establishment of local Land Boards.

By 1890, 37,000,000 acres (150,000 km^{2}) had been transferred by selection, but over half of it was owned by 677 people. Although a major purpose of the legislation was to encourage cropping, only 330,000 acres (1,300 km^{2}) were being used for wheat-growing in 1890.

== Queensland ==
The process of land selection in Queensland began in 1860 and continued under a series of land acts in subsequent years. Land was considered the colony's greatest asset. Prosperity of the colony was measured according to the extent of land settlement. Rent from land leases was the colony's largest revenue earner. The initial political contest was between pastoralists and selectors led by the "town liberals" who desired that immigrants have an equitable right to small land holdings. Closer settlement for agricultural purposes was promoted by the Queensland Government who desired settlement by immigrants to Queensland and exports of agricultural produce and raw materials such as cotton and wool to Britain. No group (pastoralists or town liberals) held a dominant control over land policy. Legislation was framed with the aim of a comprehensive land policy but was changed following the efforts by both groups to interfere in areas of occupancy conditions and priority for selection, and there was tension between free selection and long leases particularly for pastoral class land. Consequently, there were over 50 principal and amending acts covering all land legislation up to 1910.

== South Australia ==
In South Australia Premier Henry Strangways passed the Strangways Land Act in January 1869 despite conflict with pastoralists, which provided for the creation of agricultural areas and credit purchases of up to 640 acres (259 ha), with a down payment of 25 per cent and four years to pay.

== Victoria ==
By 1859 only 343,916 acres of the land of the colony of Victoria had been alienated.

The Victorian Parliament passed Land Acts in 1860, 1862 and 1869, which offered settlers land within defined agricultural areas. Settlers paid for half of an allotment on selection at a uniform price of £1 per acre and paid rent on the other half for usually 7 years. By the end of the period, to obtain title to the land, settlers would have had to pay the balance of the purchase price and make certain improvements.

== In fiction ==
Steele Rudd (Arthur Davis) wrote a series of comic novels on rural life, starting with On Our Selection (1899), about Dad, Mother and Dave Rudd of Snake Gully. The Rudds had four (or six) acres in Darling Downs, Queensland. The novels were made into films and a radio series.

Peter Carey's book True History of the Kelly Gang (2000), roughly based on the story of Ned Kelly, has its beginning in rural Victoria. The Duffy Land Act of 1862 is mentioned.
