= Edith Mary England =

Australian novelist and poet

E. M. England
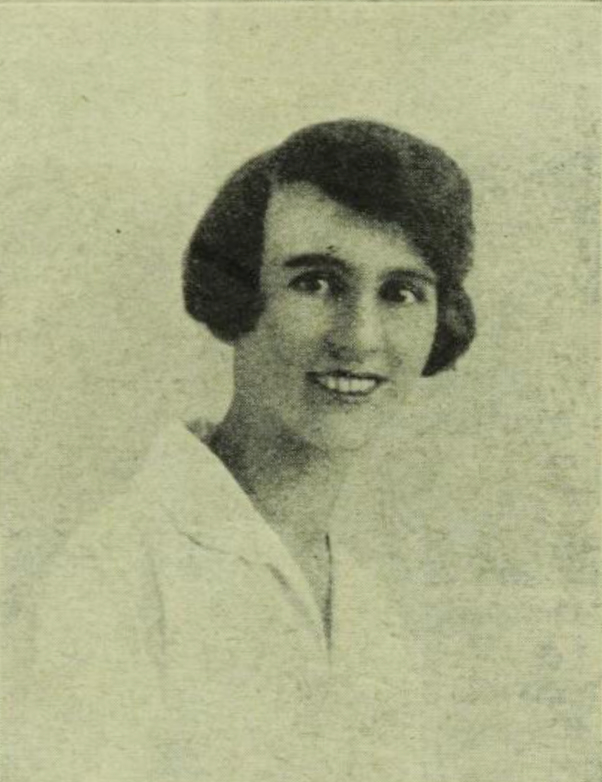
- England, c. 1928
- Born: Edith Mary England; 1 July 1899; Townsville, Queensland, Australia
- Died: 9 August 1981 (aged 82)
- Occupations: poet and novelist
- Spouse: Schomberg Montagu Bertie (m. 1922; died 1937) Harry August Anders (m. 1941; died 1968)
- Writing career
- Language: English
- Years active: 1915-1970

Edith Mary England (1 July 1899 – 9 August 1981) was an Australian novelist and poet who was born in Townsville, Queensland.

== Biography ==
England was born in Townsville, Queensland to John England and Jane Kelly England. She moved to Boonah in south-east Queensland at the age of six, and was later educated in Sydney and at Ipswich Grammar. She received a degree in music and taught for a while.

In 1922, England married Schomberg Montagu Bertie and had two daughters, Caroline (1923) and Patricia (1926). Bertie, a World War I veteran, suffered from PTSD and died by suicide in 1937. The following year, England left Boonah. She was remarried in 1941 to Harry August Anders.

E. M. England died on 9 August 1981.

== Writing career ==
Her first published poems appeared in the Australian Town and Country Journal in 1915 and her first poetry collection was published in 1927. She published eight novels during her lifetime with the first appearing as a serial in The Queenslander in 1928–29.

== Bibliography ==
=== Novels ===
- Laughing Devlin (1929)
- Hermit's Hill (1930)
- The Sealed Temple (1933)
- Strange Sequence (1948)
- House of Bondage (1950)
- Where the Turtles Dance (1950)
- Ganaralean (1950)
- Road Going North (1952)

=== Short story collection ===
- Tornado and Other Stories (1945)

=== Poetry collections ===
- The Happy Monarch and Other Verses (1927)
- Queensland Days : Poems (1944)
- Where the Old Road Ran; and Other Poems (1970)

=== Edited ===
- Lost Kinship and Other Poems : A Memorial to Llewelyn Lucas (1968)
