= Lilian Turner =

Australian writer

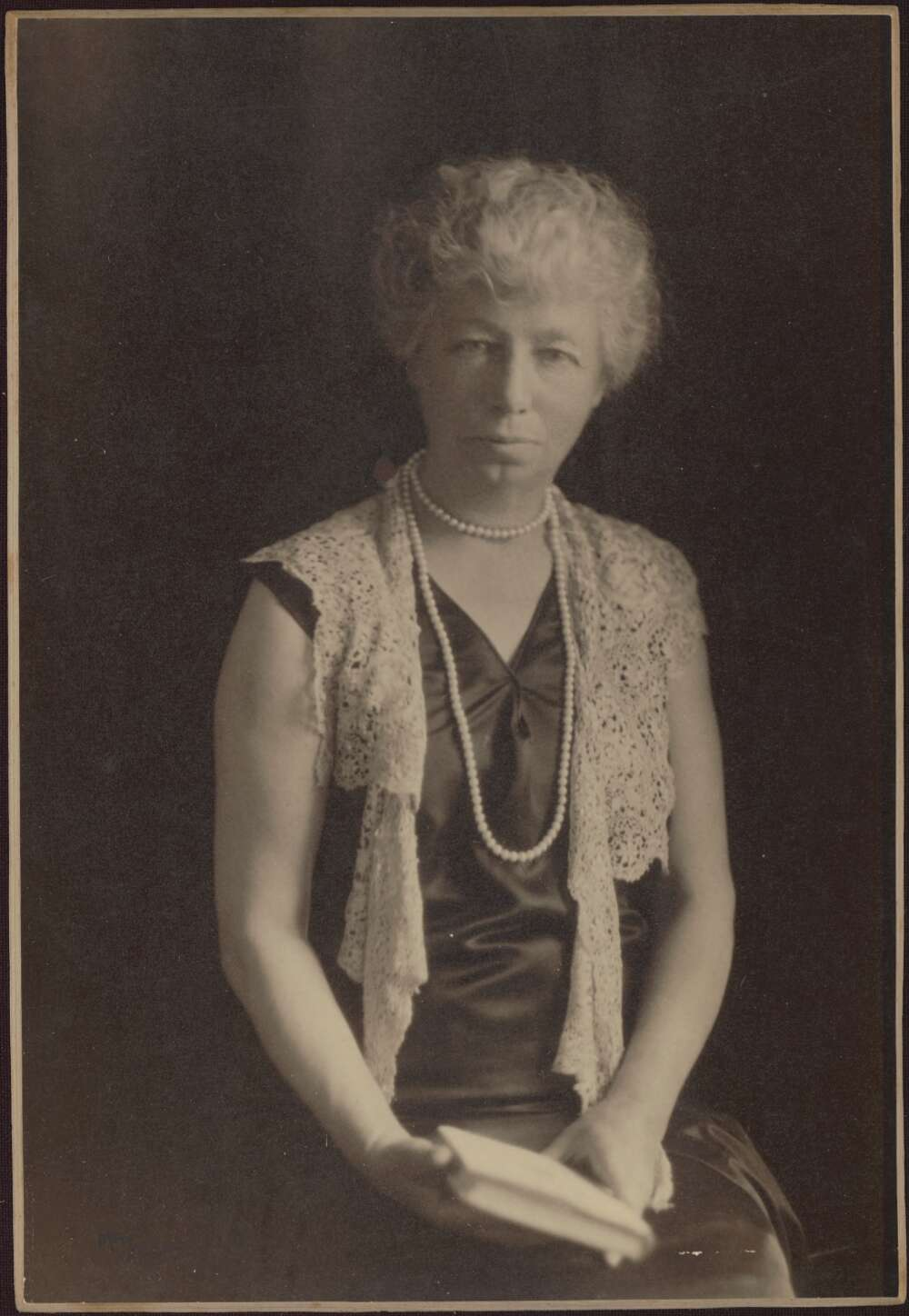
- Lilian Turner, 1927 (May Moore photograph)
- Born: Lilian Wattnall Burwell; 21 August 1867; Lincoln, Lincolnshire, England
- Died: 25 August 1956 (aged 89); Turramurra, New South Wales, Australia
- Occupations: novelist and writer for children

Lilian Turner (21 August 1867 – 25 August 1956) was an Australian writer.

== Biography ==
Lilian Wattnall Burwell was born 21 August 1867. She was the elder sister of Ethel Turner and the daughter of Bennett George and Sarah Jane Burwell. Bennett George Burwell died when Lilian was still a young child, and her mother married a widower, Henry Turner, a year later. Both Lilian and Ethel would later take their step-father's name for their professional writing careers. Sarah and Henry had a daughter, Jeannie Rose (born 1873), but Henry died suddenly in 1878. The next year, Sarah traveled to Australia with her three children, where she fell in love with and wed Charles Cope in Sydney.

Lilian and Ethel were educated at Sydney Girls' High School where they ran their own magazine, the Iris, in opposition to the Gazette, edited by Louise Mack. After leaving school the two sisters founded and co-edited a sixpenny monthly, the Parthenon, which lasted for three years. It was always the ambition of the two women to be novelists.

Lilian's early novel The Lights of Sydney (1896) won first prize in a competition run by a London publisher, but the win lead nowhere. Her work was soon eclipsed by her younger sister's and, as Brenda Niall states: "Accepting what she saw as a lesser aim, she turned to the 'flapper' novel: stories of love and ambition written for schoolgirls and young women." The World's News described Turner as "a simple, wholesome, restful writer, upon whom it is a pleasure to fall back for stories for growing Australian girls to read."

Turner was married on 22 February 1898 to Frederick Lindsay Thompson, a dentist, who was often out of work. The couple had two sons. She supported the family via her writing and over her career published a total of 25 novels. However, when she died on 25 August 1956 at Turramurra all of her novels were out of print.

== Publications ==
=== Novels ===
- By the Blue Mountains (1894) (serialised in The Australian Town and Country Journal)
- The Lights of Sydney (1896)
- Miss Elizabeth (1896) (serialised in The Australian Town and Country Journal)
- Barbara (1899) (serialised in The Australasian)
- Felise (1901) (serialised in The Evening News)
- Young Love (1902)
- An Australian Lassie (1903)
- Betty the Scribe (1906)
- Paradise and the Perrys (1908)
- The Perry Girls (1909)
- Three New Chum Girls (1910)
- April Girls (1911)
- Stairways to the Stars (1913)
- The Girl From the Back-blocks (1914)
- War's Heart Throbs (1915)
- The Noughts and Crosses (1917)
- Rachel (1920)
- Peggy the Pilot (1922)
- Jill of the Fourth (1924)
- The Happy Heriots (1926)
- Nina Comes Home (1927)
- Ann Chooses Glory (1928)
- Lady Billie (1929)
- There Came a Call (1930)
- Two Take the Road (1931)

=== Collections ===
- Written Down (1912)
