= On Our Selection =

Short story collection by Steele Rudd

On Our Selection!
- Author: Steele Rudd
- Language: English
- Genre: Short story collection
- Publisher: Bulletin, Sydney
- Publication date: 1899
- Publication place: Australia
- Media type: Print (hardback & paperback)
- Pages: 232pp
- Preceded by: –
- Followed by: Our New Selection

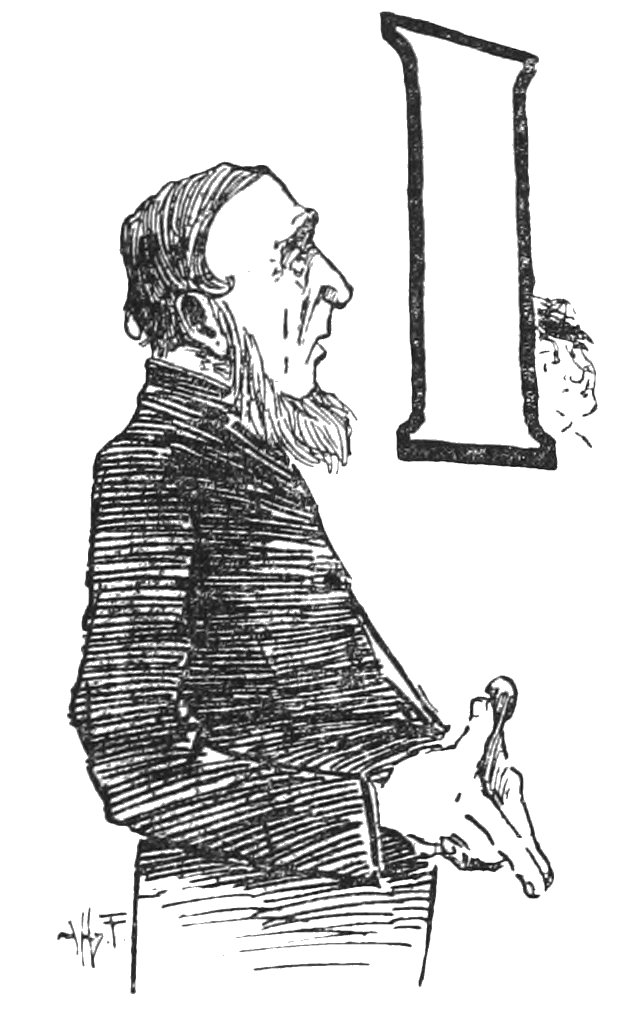
Illustration from Rudd’s book

On Our Selection (1899) is a series of stories written by Australian author Steele Rudd, the pen name of Arthur Hoey Davis, in the late 1890s, featuring the characters Dad and Dave Rudd.

The original edition of the book was illustrated by the Australian artists A. J. Fischer, Albert Henry Fullwood, G. W. Lambert, Fred Leist, Frank P. Mahony and Alf Vincent.

== Background synopsis ==
Towards the end of 1895 Davis sent to The Bulletin a sketch Starting The Selection based on his father's experience. The sketch was published on 14 December 1895. Encouraged by J. F. Archibald, the editor and publisher of The Bulletin, Davis continued writing the series of sketches. The stories were originally written about different families but accepting a suggestion by A. G. Stephens, a writer at The Bulletin, the work was reconstructed as the experiences of the Rudd family.

In Australian history, a selection was a "free selection before survey" of crown land under legislation introduced in the 1860s, similar to the United States Homestead Act. Selectors often came into conflict with squatters, who already occupied the land and often managed to circumvent the law.

The Bulletin published the illustrated collection comprising 26 stories in 1899 as On Our Selection. Within four years 20,000 copies had been printed. It afterwards appeared in numerous cheap editions and by 1940 the number of copies sold had reached 250,000.

== Contents ==
- "Starting the Selection"
- "Our First Harvest"
- "Before We Got the Deeds"
- "When the Wolf Was at the Door"
- "The Night We Watched for Wallabies"
- "Good Old Bess"
- "Cranky Jack"
- "A Kangaroo Hunt from Shingle Hut"
- "Dave's Snake-Bite"
- "Dad and the Two Donovans"
- "A Splendid Year for Corn"
- "Kate's Wedding"
- "The Summer Old Bob Died"
- "When Dan Came Home"
- "Our Circus"
- "When Joe Was in Charge"
- "Dad's Fortune"
- "We Embark in the Bear Industry"
- "Nell and Ned"
- "The Cow We Bought"
- "The Parson and the Scone"
- "Callaghan's Colt"
- "The Agricultural Reporter"
- "A Lady at Shingle Hut"
- "The Man with the Bear-Skin Cap"
- "One Christmas"

== Critical reception ==
A reviewer in The Queenslander, after pointing out that the author was a Queenslander and that the stories were set in Queensland, was very impressed with the work: " It is a volume whose recommendation rests solely on its own excellence, and that excellence is more than sufficiently great to guarantee a hearty welcome and a keen appreciation of "Steele Rudd's" talent...No review of the book would be complete without a reference to the excellent illustrations which enliven its pages. Men in the front rank of Australian artists, like Vincent, Fischer, Lambert, Mahoney, Fullwood, and Leist, have lent their beat energies to catching the author's method, his moods and his types. Usually illustration hinder rather than help the text, but in this case the reverse is the order, and it is doubtful whether anybody could fully understand the personality of Dad, Mother, and the others without Vincent's delightful pen-and-ink sketches."

A reviewer in The Western Mail (Perth) called the collection "really admirable" and went on "As the title implies, the story—or rather the series of sketches—deals with the duties of a family on a New South Wales selection. Anyone reared in the bush in Australia must admit the truthfulness of the study, with its manifold parings and scrapings, its many attempts to evade the miseries of the moneyless, and the vain attempts to make profits on a selection which was, to say the least of it, very unwilling to provide even a living for "Dad" and the rest of them."

== Stage and film adaptations ==
The stories have also been the basis of a play and several films. Davis sold the rights to a stage version of On Our Selection to Bert Bailey. The play was first produced by his company on 4 May 1912 at the Palace Theatre, Sydney. The play version deviated from the original version by the addition of subplots involving murder and a love triangle. Though it did well in Australia, it failed in London in 1920. In 1920, Davis sold the film rights to the stories to producer E.J. Carroll. Carroll did not have the rights to Bert Bailey's play adaptations, so the plot was based directly on the original work. Raymond Longford directed the 1920 silent film version of On Our Selection. In 1932, Bert Bailey's stage version was filmed in a talking film version of the stories. The 1932 film version of On Our Selection was directed by Ken G. Hall, who also co-wrote the script with Bailey. Most of the cast had appeared in the stage version. The movie was one of the most popular Australian films of all time. In 1995, a new version titled Dad and Dave: On Our Selection was produced, a remake of the 1920 silent film version, the version which was by then in the public domain. The film was presented as an honour to the centenary of Australian cinema, but the version was not especially successful.

== Radio series ==
There was also a radio series of the work, Dad and Dave from Snake Gully, which began in 1937.

== Notes ==
Epigraph: "Pioneers of Australia! To you 'Who gave Our Country Birth'; to the memory of you whose names, whose giant enterprise, whose deeds of fortitude and daring were never engraved on tablet or tombstone; to you who strove through the silences of the bush-lands and made them ours; to you who delved and toiled in loneliness through the years that have faded away; to you who have no place in the history of our country so far as it is yet written; to you who have done most for this land; to you for whom few, in the march of settlement, in the turmoil of busy city life, now appear to care; and to you particularly, Good Old Dad, this book is most affectionately dedicated."'

The initial print run was of the collection was 3,000 copies in 1899; 3,750 in 1901; 5,000 in 1902 and 8,450 in 1903.

== See also ==
- Selection (Australian history)
- 1899 in Australian literature
