= The New Zealand Tablet =

Weekly Catholic periodical

The New Zealand Tablet was a weekly Catholic periodical published in Dunedin from 1873 to 1996.

== History ==
Originally aimed at the influx of Irish immigrants to the new country, the New Zealand Tablet was founded by the first Bishop of Dunedin, Patrick Moran. Moran was noted as a strong-minded and literate speaker and the paper gave him the opportunity to voice his views on religion, the church, and politics - especially the latter. Moran was noted for his opposition to the secularisation of education (a policy of the New Zealand government), and strongly vocal on the issue of Irish nationalism, and used the paper as a pulpit from which to write on both subjects.

Moran died in 1895, and during the ten years which followed - under the editorship of Henry Cleary - the paper adopted a more gentle approach to politics. James Kelly, editor from 1917 to 1931, adopted a line closer to Moran's — so much so that Cleary founded an opposition Catholic journal, The Month, in 1918. Kelly's editorship raised hackles with its pro-Irish republican leanings, especially in the years around and immediately after World War I. Eventually, Kelly was forced to resign from the paper's editorship at the beginning of the 1930s. The Tablet remained an important means of communication within the New Zealand Catholic community, but after Kelly's time maintained a less outspoken approach. His successor, Leonard John Cronin, who was editor between 1932 and 1937, focused less on New Zealand politics and more on international affairs.

Despite this, it remained a political force, especially under the editorship of John Patrick Kennedy from 1967 to 1989. Kennedy was an astute political analyst and lively writer. During his career as editor of Tablet, he also developed a close friendship with Prime Minister Rob Muldoon and the Society for the Protection of Unborn Children president Des Dalgety, who all shared socially conservative views on moral and social issues. During the Muldoon era, The Tablet adopted a pro-Muldoonist editorial standpoint that favoured the National Party and Muldoon himself contributed several articles and supported the newspaper's position on private schools.

During the 1980s, The Tablet had an adversarial relationship with the left-leaning Catholic Commission for Justice, Peace and Development. One of the newspaper's most high-profile columnists was the journalist Bernard Moran, who became known for his conservative and anti-Communist leanings. In February 1989, he published a two-part article known as "The Philippines Connection" which alleged that the Philippines Solidarity Network had left-wing or pro-Communist leanings. This created controversy with the New Zealand Catholic Church hierarchy.

Following Kennedy's death, the Tablet struggled to maintain the level of support it had during his editorship. By 1988, The Tablet's circulation had dropped from 20,000 to around 8,000. The newspaper ceased publication in April 1996.
