= The Catholic Weekly =

Newspaper in Sydney, Australia

- Format: tabloid
- Editor: Roman Catholic Archdiocese of Sydney
- Language: English
- Headquarters: Sydney
- Website: catholicweekly.com.au

The Catholic Weekly is an English language newspaper currently published in Sydney, Australia. It is published in tabloid format. Throughout its history, it has also been published as The Freeman's Journal and Catholic Freeman's Journal.

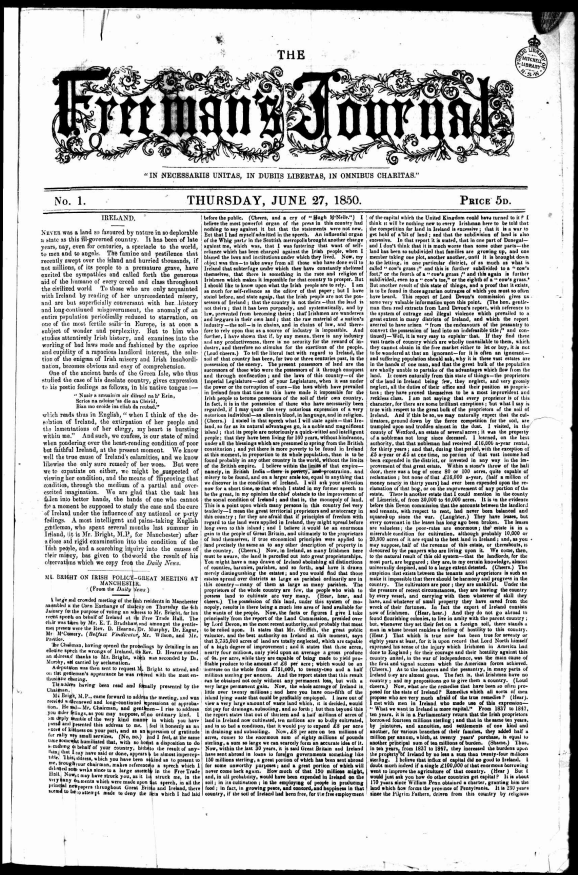
Front page of The Freeman's Journal newspaper on 27 June 1850.

== History ==
The paper's history can be traced back to 27 June 1850 when it was named The Freeman's Journal, under the influence of editor and later-archdeacon John McEncroe (1794–1868). Printer and publisher Jeremiah Moore went onto running a successful bookstore. John Francis Blakeney (–1914) was one of its principal editors, commencing as an apprentice in 1867. The managing director until 1919 was Mr J. H. de Courcy, having started in the printing section of the paper about 1865. Initially based in George Street, Sydney, by May 1886 was moved to Lang Street, and in 1925, to the Hibernian Building, Elizabeth Street.

In 1932 its name changed to Catholic Freeman's Journal. In 1942, the Catholic Freeman's Journal merged with another Catholic paper, The Catholic Press, and became The Catholic Weekly which it remains today.

The Freeman's Journal was a general newspaper with a focus on Catholic and Irish affairs with an Australian outlook. The paper also campaigned for Catholic education in Australia. It often maintained an independent line, not controlled by the clergy.

== Digitisation ==
The various versions of the paper have been digitised as part of the Australian Newspapers Digitisation Program, a project hosted by the National Library of Australia.

== See also ==
- Catholic Church in Australia
- List of newspapers in New South Wales
- List of newspapers in Australia

== Bibliography ==
- Two hundred years of Sydney newspapers : a short history, by Victor Isaacs and Rod Kirkpatrick, North Richmond, N.S.W. : Rural Press, 2003.
- Looking good : the changing appearance of Australian newspapers / by Victor Isaacs, for the Australian Newspapers History Group, Middle Park, Qld.: Australian Newspaper History Group, 2007.
- Press timeline : Select chronology of significant Australian press events to 2011 / Compiled by Rod Kirkpatrick for the Australian Newspaper History Group
- Australian Newspaper History : A Bibliography / Compiled by Victor Isaacs, Rod Kirkpatrick and John Russell, Middle Park, Qld. : Australian Newspaper History Group, 2004.
- Newspapers in Australian libraries : a union list. 4th ed.
