= George Essex Evans =

Australian poet (1863–1909)

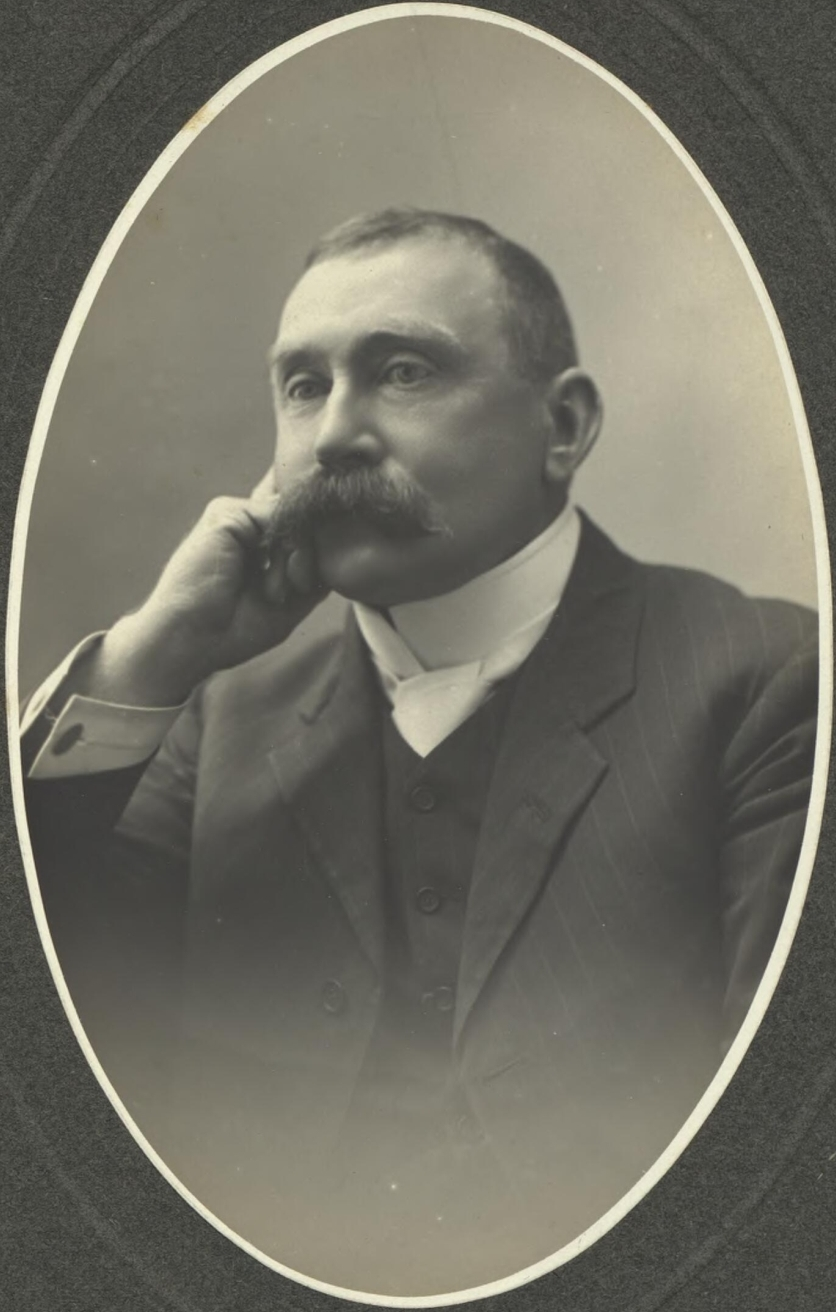
- Born: 18 June 1863; United Kingdom
- Died: 10 November 1909 (aged 46); Toowoomba, Queensland, Australia
- Education: Attended Haverfordwest Grammar School and James Collegiate School of Jersey
- Occupations: Poet, journalist, farmer, teacher, and public servant
- Spouse: Blanche Hopkins
- Writing career
- Pen name: G. Evans Essex; Anglo-Australian; Christophus; Coolabah; Drayton; and Kurrajong
- Genres: Poetry, short stories, journalism, literary criticism, and song lyrics

George Essex Evans (18 June 1863 – 10 November 1909) was an Australian poet.

== Biography ==
Essex Evans was born in London on 18 June 1863, to Welsh parents. His father, John Evans Q.C., Treasurer of the Inner Temple and a member of the House of Commons, died in 1864 when his son was only a few months old; he left his family £60,000. George Essex Evans was raised and educated by his mother Mary Ann (née Owen), who was one of the Bowens of Llwynwair, an old Welsh family. She was an educated woman, fluent in both Latin and Greek. The family lived in Haverfordwest in Pembrokeshire where Essex Evans attended Haverfordwest Grammar School and then the St. James Collegiate School of Jersey.

Essex Evans was partly deaf and although he was an excellent athlete, his tutors thought him "dull". His hearing impediment prevented him going into the armed forces.

In 1881, when Essex Evans was 17, the siblings J.B.O. (John Bowen Owen), Blanche Gough and Beatrice emigrated to Queensland, Australia, travelling first class on a journey around the Cape of Good Hope that lasted 65 days. Upon arrival in Queensland, the brothers bought some land in the Darling Downs with the intention of farming. Essex Evans, however, was badly injured in a horse riding accident, when he was thrown against a tree, and was unable to do any physical work. He represented Queensland in Rugby Union football, and also took part in athletic pursuits, competing in wrestling, running, and swimming.

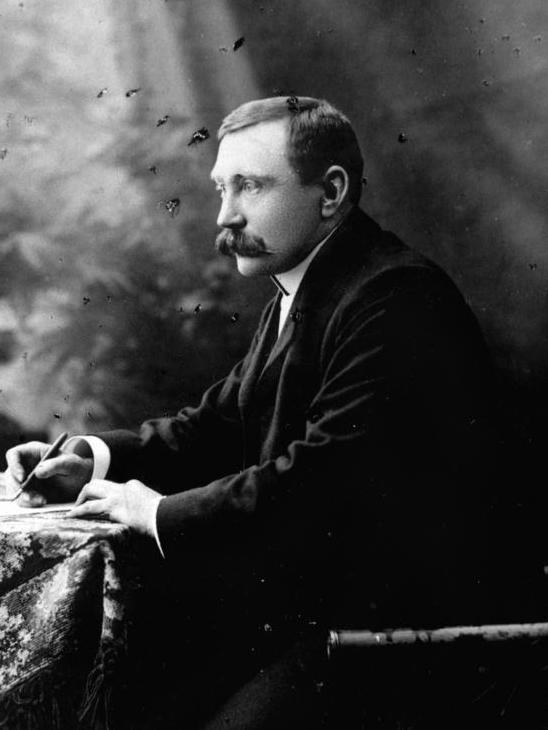
Essex Evans with ink pen

Essex Evans suffered from increasing deafness as he grew older, and this may be the reason why he was thought to be a secretive, quiet man. Initially he earned a living by working as a teacher at a private school, but eventually became an Agricultural Editor of The Queenslander. He also wrote travel books for the Government Tourist and Intelligence Bureau. He entered the public service in 1888 and eventually became District Registrar of births, deaths and marriages first for Gympie and then later for Toowoomba.

In 1899, Essex Evans married Blanche Hopkins, the young widow of E. B. Hopkins of Goondiwindi, the daughter of the late Rev. William Eglinton, a man who, himself liked to write poems. She was also sister of astronomer Dudley Eglinton, and former Police Magistrate & Native Mounted Police Sub-Inspector Ernest Eglinton. The wedding was described as a very secret affair. A letter from Evans to Dr. Black, whom he sought to perform the service, asks for a quiet ceremony with little fuss in Drayton. They were married on 6 November 1899.

Essex Evans and Blanche had two sons. The younger one, Owen Meylett Eglinton Essex Evans, died at five and a half years of ileo colitis acuta (a form of diarrhoea) As a result of his marriage, Essex Evans also had two stepdaughters, Lorna and Beryl Hopkins.

They built their home, "Glenbar", on the Tollbar Road on the eastern slope of the Toowoomba range. Essex Evans's sister continued to live with him.

Evans founded the Austral Society in Toowoomba in 1903 to promote music, art, literature, science and industry.

Essex Evans was described as a reserved man, and at times rather moody and impulsive. However, he was also described as a kind person and a loyal friend. He had a strong sense of honour and self-respect, traits which made him a model husband and father.

Essex Evans was described as having a tremendous memory, particularly for poetic verse, of which he was able to recite a prodigious amount. Few of his contemporaries were able to match his breadth of knowledge of English, American and Australian poetry.

== Works ==
Essex Evans's works were highly regarded during his career and for a time following his death. He was publicly praised by many acknowledged critics and political figures including William Archer, Sir Samuel Griffith, Alfred Deakin and Sir Henry Parkes.

His first volume of poetry, The Repentance of Magdalene Despar, was published in 1891. Between 1892 and 1897 Essex Evans was associated with Banjo Paterson and John Tighe Ryan in the production of the periodical The Antipodean, which appeared three times. In 1898 another collection of poetry, Loraine and other Verses, was published. In 1901 Evans won a prize of fifty guineas for his "Ode for Commonwealth Day". Although this ode was praised by the then Prime Minister, Alfred Deakin, it was criticised by his peers as trite.

The Secret Key and other Verses, which included part of the Loraine volume, was published in 1906. Essex Evans won a reputation in his own state of Queensland as the author of patriotic verse, as in "Cymru", and his bush ballads, such as "The Women of the West", were popular.

His work was also noticed by the Queensland State Government. Following the success of The Garden of Queensland, Essex Evans was promoted to the Chief Secretary's department to advertise and "sell" Queensland at the Franco-British Exhibition in Paris in May 1908.

Essex Evans also wrote and produced some theatrical works for the Brisbane Theatre including Robinson Crusoe, a pantomime, and Musical Whist. During the last two years of his life he wrote prolifically about the resources of his state for the Queensland government.

Essex Evans has over 200 published poems attributed to his name. His work frequently appeared in Australian newspapers and he wrote in many other literary forms including short stories, essays, various humorous works and a novella.

== Death ==
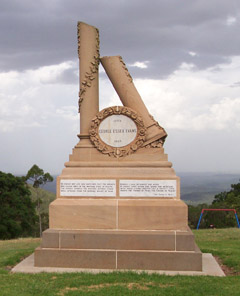
Essex Evans Memorial in Webb Park, Toowoomba

Essex Evans was an advocate for the construction of a new road northward across the Australia and after falling ill in 1909 he became the first passenger to be transported over it when taken to hospital. The men working on the road were so overcome with sorrow for the poet who had worked hard to bring about the new road that they relieved the ambulance men of their duty.

Essex Evans died from complications arising from gallbladder surgery in 1909 at forty-six years of age. The news of his death was first delivered on the stage of the Austral Hall during the largest Austral Festival celebrations ever held. His death prompted an emergency meeting of the Austral Association Committee who, knowing that of all the titles Essex Evans held he was most proud of 'Founder of the Austral Association,' decided that the festival must continue. A series of emotional tributes to his impact on advancing the cause of Australian music, art and literature followed.

His funeral was held on 11 November 1909 at the St. James Church and he was eulogized by Alfred Deakin with whom he shared a long correspondence in Federal Parliament as 'Australia's Poet.'

In a speech that was wired to the poet's widow after his death, Australian Prime Minister Deakin shared his sentiments stating that he was "Deeply grieved at sudden and unexpected death of your greatly-gifted husband. Australia will mourn the loss of her national poet whose patriotic songs stirred her people profoundly in the arduous campaign for union."

A memorial of Essex Evans was raised in Webb Park, Toowoomba. Inscribed on the statue are several verses from his poems, including the following excerpt from his poem "Toowoomba":

Dark purple, chased with sudden gloom and glory,
Like waves in wild unrest.
Low-wooded billows and steep summits hoary,
Ridge, slope and mountain crest,
Cease at her feet with faces turned to greet her,
Enthroned, apart, serene,
Above her vassal hills whose voices greet her
The Mountain Queen.

Many years after his death, on the anniversary of his birthday, large numbers of Toowoomba citizens would gather to pay homage to their great poet, in annual pilgrimages held at his monument in Webb Park.

== Legacy ==
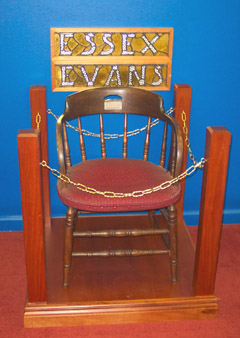
Essex Evans's chair in the Toowoomba City Library

An edition of his Collected Verse was published in 1928.

An annual pilgrimage to his memorial site has been carried out by the Toowoomba Ladies Literary Society since 1929. The society have also established a plaque at the site of Essex Evans's home to commemorate his memory.

A collection of Essex Evans's artefacts and archives can be found at the Toowoomba City Library. The Fryer Library at The University of Queensland also holds his papers.

== Bibliography ==
=== Poetry collections ===
- The Repentance of Magdalene Despar and Other Poems, 1891
- Loraine and other Verses, 1898
- The Sword of Pain, 1905
- The Secret Key and Other Verses, 1906
- Kara, and other verses, 1910
- The Collected Verse of G. Essex Evans, 1928

=== Individual poems ===
- The Women of the West (1901)
- Queen of the North: A Jubilee Ode (1909)

== Other reading ==
- George Essex Evans: Patriotic Poet of Australia - Volume 1 - His Life and Family. Bill Johnston. Maleny Qld. 2006.
