= Steele Rudd =

Author novelist and short story author (1868 - 1935)

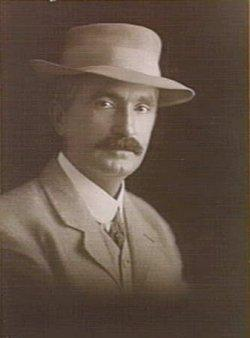
- Born: Arthur Hoey Davis; 14 November 1868; Drayton, Queensland, Australia
- Died: 11 October 1935 (aged 66); Brisbane, Queensland, Australia
- Resting place: Toowong Cemetery
- Occupation: Author
- Spouse: Violet Christina Davis
- Partner(s): Winifred Hamilton, Beatrice Sharp
- Writing career
- Pen name: Steele Rudd
- Notable works: On Our Selection, Rudd's Magazine
- Notable awards: King George V Silver Jubilee Medal
- Movement: Bulletin School

Steele Rudd was the pen name of Arthur Hoey Davis (14 November 1868 – 11 October 1935) an Australian author, best known for his short story collection On Our Selection.

In 2009, as part of the Q150 celebrations, Rudd was named one of the Q150 Icons for his role in Queensland literature.

== Early life ==
Davis was born at Drayton near Toowoomba, Queensland. His parents were Thomas Davis (1828–1904), a blacksmith from Abernant in south Wales who arrived to Australia in 1847 due to a five-year conviction for petty theft, and Mary, née Green (1835–1893), an Irishwoman from Galway who was driven to emigrate by the Great Famine.

In 1889, Davis moved to the sheriff's office and he began writing a column on rowing in a weekly paper. He needed a pseudonym and adopted "Steele Rudder", the first name from the English essayist Richard Steele, the second chosen because he wanted to bring into his name some part of a boat. Later it was shortened to "Steele Rudd". During his time as under sheriff, Davis had to give the signal at the hanging of Patrick Kenniff which left him nervous and irritable for months after the event.

== Writing career ==
His reputation was established by his short stories of country life. The 1920 movie On Our Selection and 1932–1952 radio series Dad and Dave helped turn the characters into Australian cultural icons.

Davis, however, detested his struggling but admirable family being made into comic yokels, and had nothing to do with the radio program. There is no character called 'Mabel' attached to Dave anywhere in the entire Rudd canon of fiction: Dave briefly had a girlfriend called Fanny in one story, and he eventually married a girl called Lily. Davis had a profound respect for the pioneering Australian woman, and he was particularly incensed by the use of 'Mum' when referring to Mrs Rudd. "'It is 'Mother', 'Mother', Mother!' he would shout, flushed in the face."

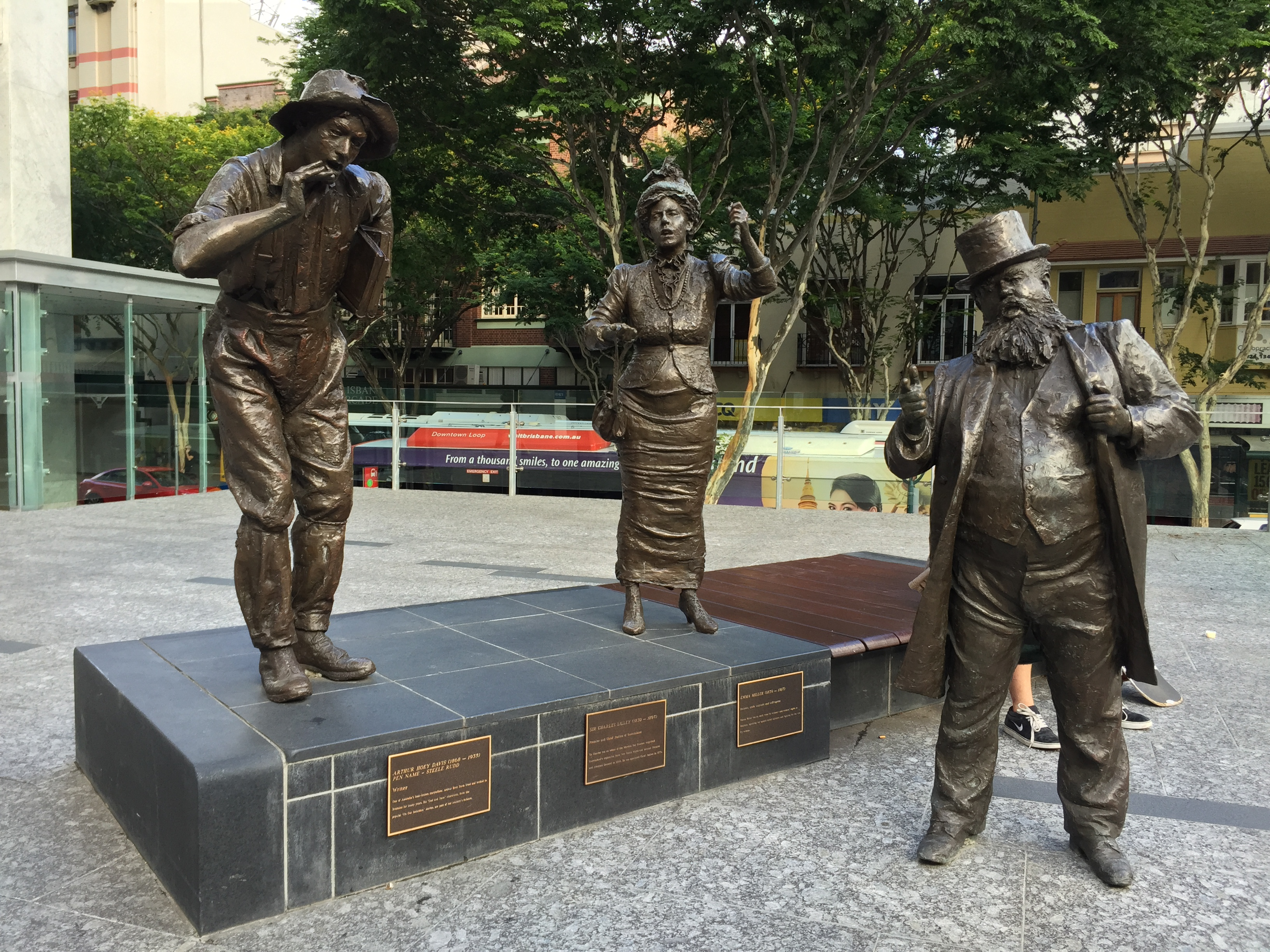
Steele Rudd statue in King George Square, Brisbane

A replica of Rudd's shingle hut can still be seen at the town of Nobby, Queensland. There is a statue of Steele Rudd at the Speakers' Corner in King George Square in Brisbane. There is also a residential college named "Steele Rudd" at the University of Southern Queensland campus.

There are copper statues of Dad, Dave, Mum and Mabel at Gundagai.

== Bibliography ==
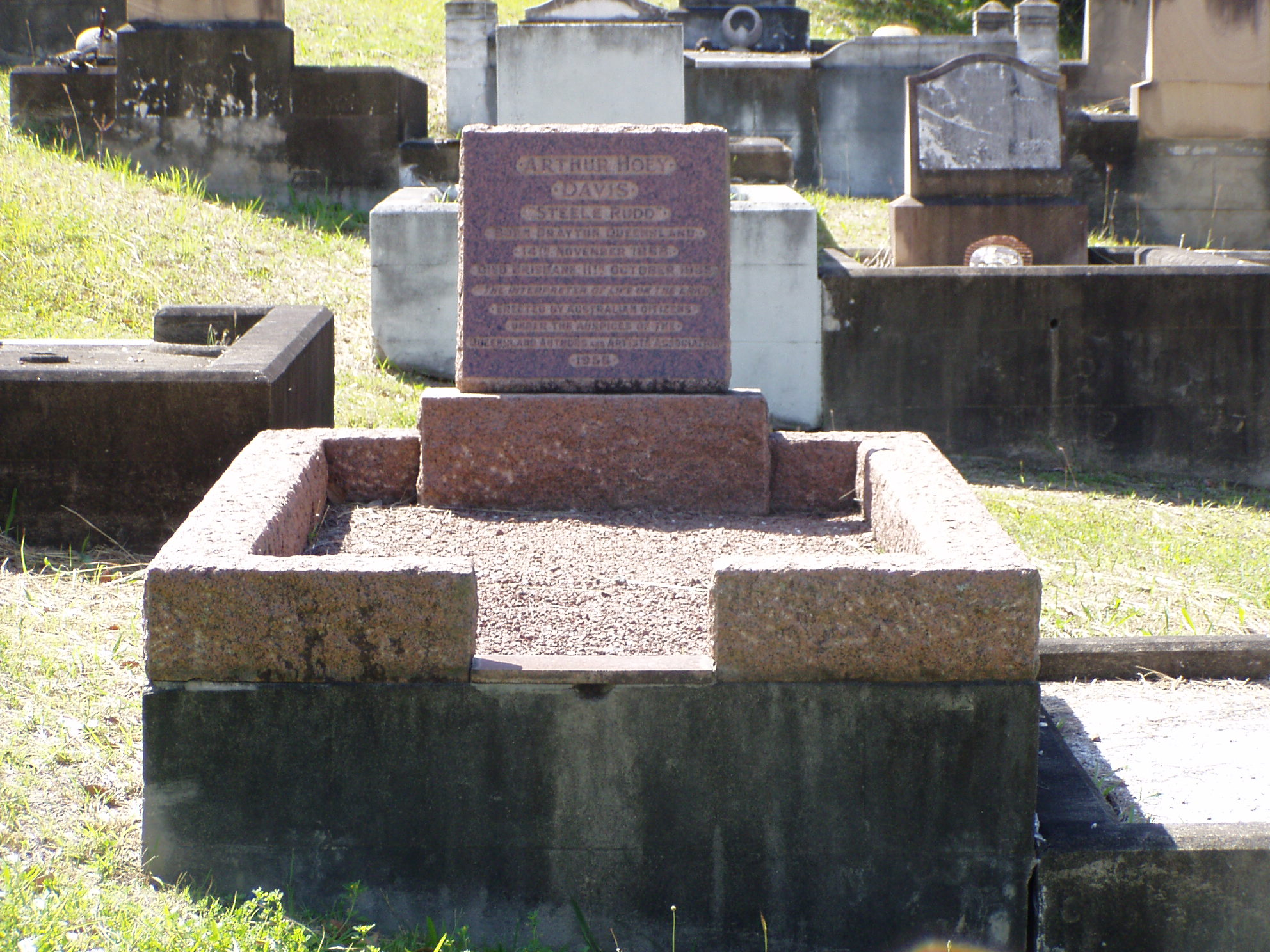
Steele Rudd's grave at Toowong Cemetery in Brisbane

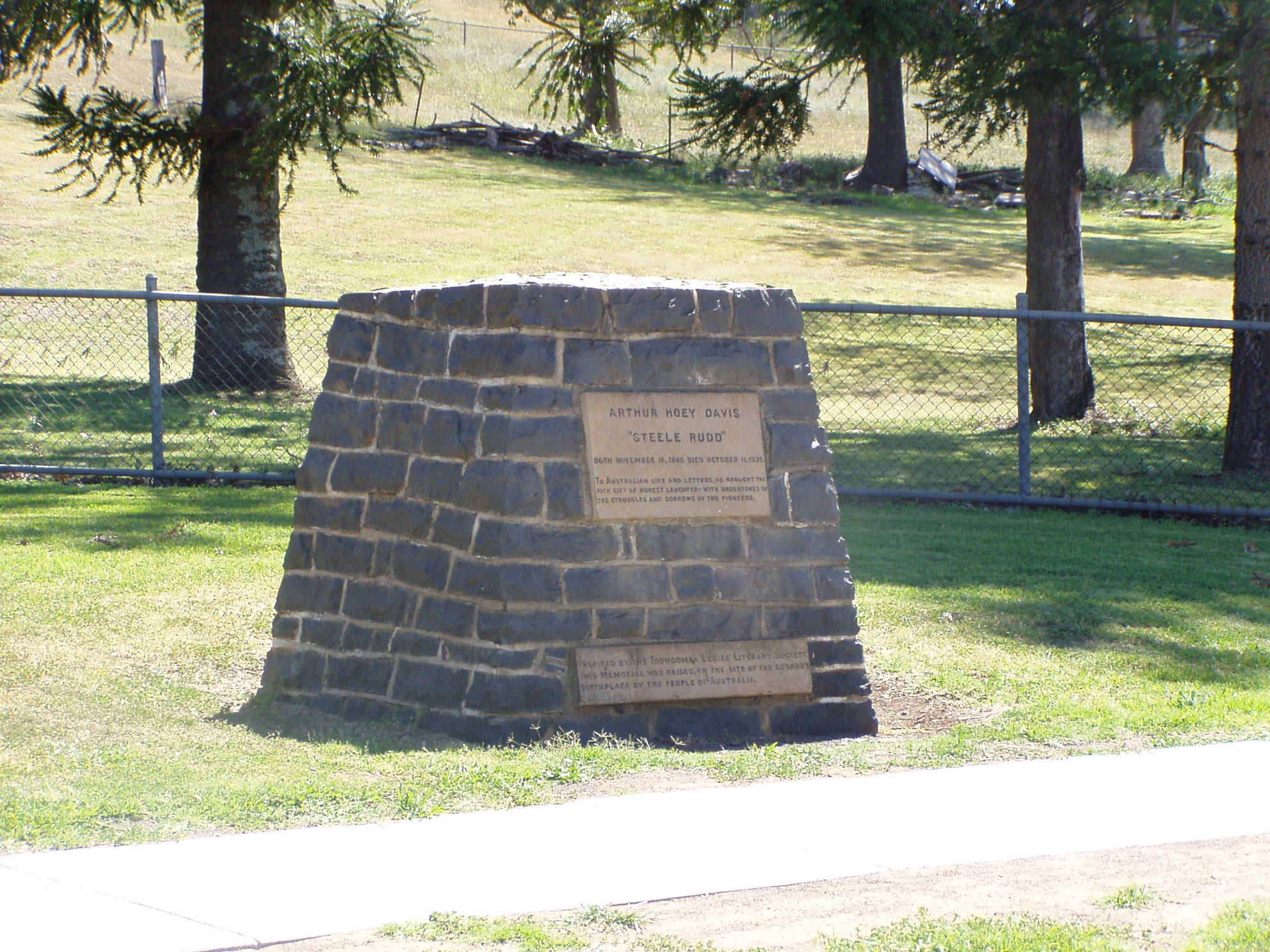
Monument celebrating the birthplace of Arthur Hoey Davis at Drayton, Queensland.

=== Novels ===
- In Australia (1908)
- Duncan McClure : Being Part II of 'The Poor Parson' (1909)
- The Book of Dan (1911)
- The Old Homestead (1913)
- Memoirs of Corporal Keeley (1918)
- We Kaytons (1919)
- On Emu Creek (1922)
- Me an' th' Son (1924)
- The Miserable Clerk (1924)
- The Romance of Runnibede (1927)
- Green Grey Homestead (1934)

=== Short story collections ===
- On Our Selection (1899) (sold over 250,000 copies)
- Our New Selection (1903)
- Sandy's Selection (1904)
- Back at Our Selection (1906)
- The Poor Parson (1907)
- Dad in Politics and Other Stories (1908)
- For Life and Other Stories (1908)
- Stocking Our Selection (1909)
- From Selection to City (1909)
- On an Australian Farm (1910)
- The Dashwoods (1911) illustrated by Claude Marquet
- Grandpa's Selection (1916)
- The Rudd Family (1926) illustrated by Percy Lindsay

=== Plays ===
- McClure and the Parson (1916)

== Quotation ==
In his 1908 book, Dad in Politics, Davis satirises political life in the opening sentence:

Smith, the member for our district, died one day, and we forgot all about him the next. Not that a politician is ever remembered much after he dies, but Smith had been a blind, bigoted, old Tory, and was better dead. Politicians are mostly better dead, so far as other people and their country is concerned …

This quotation is often used to illustrate the cynicism of Australians towards the political class. FitzHenry notes that Davis's satirical depiction of individual members of the Queensland Parliament was so close to reality that he was almost called to the Bar of the House of Parliament for breach of parliamentary privilege.

== Dramatisation ==
- 1912 Our Selection was performed as adapted by actor Bert Bailey ( 1868–1935)

A play titled The Execution of Steele Rudd by Australian playwright Harry Reade was first staged in 1981 by the National Theatre at the Playhouse, Perth, directed by Stephen Barry. It portrays the character and actions of Davis who is employed in the sheriff's office, managing arrangements for the execution of two criminals. The play was also staged by Melbourne's Playbox Theatre in 1983.

== See also ==
- Selection (Australian history)

== Bibliography ==
- Serle, Percival (1949). "Davis, Arthur Hoey". Dictionary of Australian Biography. Sydney: Angus & Robertson.
- FitzHenry, W E (1954). "Foreword". Steele Rudd: On Our Selection and Our New Selection. Angus and Robertson.
- Lindsay, Norman (1973). "Steele Rudd". Bohemians of the Bulletin. Angus and Robertson Classics. ISBN 0-207-12946-0.
- Cantrell, Leon, ed. (1977). A. G. Stephens: selected writings. Angus and Robertson. ISBN 0-207-13244-5.
