= You Can't See 'Round Corners =

You Can't See 'Round Corners may refer to:

- You Can't See 'Round Corners (novel), a 1947 novel by Jon Cleary
- You Can't See 'Round Corners (TV series), a 1967 Australian TV series, based on the novel
- You Can't See 'round Corners, a 1969 Australian film, a version of the TV series
