= 1959 in Australian literature =

This article presents a list of the historical events and publications of Australian literature during 1959.

== Books ==
- Nancy Cato – Time, Flow Softly
- Jon Cleary
  - Back of Sunset
  - Strike Me Lucky with Joy Cleary
- Eleanor Dark – Lantana Lane
- David Forrest – The Last Blue Sea
- Xavier Herbert – Seven Emus
- Dorothy Hewett – Bobbin Up
- Barbara Jefferis – Half Angel
- Eric Lambert – Glory Thrown In
- Leonard Mann – Andrea Caslin
- D'Arcy Niland
  - The Big Smoke
  - Gold in the Streets
- Vance Palmer – The Big Fellow
- F. J. Thwaites – No Rainbow in the Sky
- George Turner – Young Man of Talent
- Arthur Upfield
  - Bony and the Black Virgin (aka The Tom Branch)
  - Journey to the Hangman
- Morris West – The Devil's Advocate

== Short stories ==
- Ethel Anderson – The Little Ghosts
- David Campbell – Flame and Shadow : Selected Stories
- A. Bertram Chandler
  - "Chance Encounter"
  - "The Man Who Could Not Stop"
- David Forrest – "That Barambah Mob"
- Hal Porter
  - "Country Town"
  - "Fiend and Friend"
- Katharine Susannah Prichard – N'goola and Other Stories
- Judith Wright — "In the Park"

== Children's and Young Adult fiction ==
- Eleanor Spence – The Summer in Between
- Kylie Tennant – All the Proud Tribesmen
- Norman Barnett Tindale and H. A. Lindsay – Rangatira

== Poetry ==
- John Blight – "A Sailor's Grave"
- David Campbell – "We Took the Storms to Bed"
- Bruce Dawe
  - "The City : Midnight"
  - "Enter Without So Much as Knocking"
- Rosemary Dobson
  - "Captain Svenson"
  - "The Edge"
- R. D. Fitzgerald – "Quayside Meditation"
- William Hart-Smith – Poems of Discovery
- Gwen Harwood – "Prize-Giving"
- Charles Higham – The Earthbound and Other Poems
- A. D. Hope – "Agony Column"
- Lionel Lindsay – Discobolus and Other Verse
- Nan McDonald – The Lighthouse and Other Poems
- John Manifold – "On the Boundary"
- David Martin – "Gordon Childe"
- Ian Mudie – The Blue Crane
- Elizabeth Riddell
  - "After Lunik Two"
  - "Suburban Song"
- Douglas Stewart – "Leopard-Skin"
- Chris Wallace-Crabbe – The Music of Division

== Biography ==
- Charmian Clift – Peel Me a Lotus
- Mary Durack – Kings in Grass Castles
- Errol Flynn – My Wicked, Wicked Ways
- Ion Idriess – The Tin Scratchers
- Peter Ryan – Fear Drive My Feet

== Children's and Young Adult non-fiction ==
- Dale Collins – Anzac Adventure

== Awards and honours ==
=== Literary ===
Award	Author	Title	Publisher
ALS Gold Medal	Randolph Stow	To the Islands	Penguin Books
Miles Franklin Award	Vance Palmer	The Big Fellow	Angus and Robertson

=== Children and Young Adult ===
Award	Category	Author	Title	Publisher
Children's Book of the Year Award	Older Readers	Nan Chauncy, illustrated by Geraldine Spence	Devil's Hill	Oxford University Press
Children's Book of the Year Award	Older Readers	John Gunn, illustrated by Brian Keogh	Sea Menace	Constable
Children's Book of the Year Award	Picture Book	No award		

=== Poetry ===
Award	Author	Title	Publisher
Grace Leven Prize for Poetry	R. D. Fitzgerald	The Wind at Your Door	Talkarra Press

== Births ==
A list, ordered by date of birth (and, if the date is either unspecified or repeated, ordered alphabetically by surname) of births in 1959 of Australian literary figures, authors of written works or literature-related individuals follows, including year of death.

- 10 January – Gabrielle Carey, writer (died 2023)
- 28 January – Philip Hodgins, poet (died 1995)
- 18 May – Sophie Masson, novelist
- 27 June – Stephen Dedman, writer
- 13 September – Andy Kissane, poet
- 13 October – Doug MacLeod, children's writer, poet, screenwriter and playwright (died 2021)
- 25 November – Merlinda Bobis, writer and academic

Unknown date

- Jennifer Fallon, novelist
- Mike Ladd, poet

== Deaths ==
A list, ordered by date of death (and, if the date is either unspecified or repeated, ordered alphabetically by surname) of deaths in 1959 of Australian literary figures, authors of written works or literature-related individuals follows, including year of birth.

- 15 July – Vance Palmer, novelist (born 1885)
- 14 October – Errol Flynn, author and actor (born 1909)

== See also ==
- 1959 in Australia
- 1959 in literature
- 1959 in poetry
- List of years in Australian literature
- List of years in literature
