= The Long Pursuit =

Book by Jon Cleary

- First UK edition
- Author: Jon Cleary
- Language: English
- Publisher: Collins (UK); William Morrow (US)
- Publication date: 1967
- Publication place: Australia
- Preceded by: The Pulse of Danger
- Followed by: Season of Doubt

The Long Pursuit is a 1967 novel written by the Australian author Jon Cleary.

The novel concerns the escape of a group of survivors from the Battle of Singapore in the Second World War, including a British soldier, an American engineer, an Australian soldier, an Italian auto distributor and a bank clerk. They run into a Dutch woman.

== Background ==
Cleary started writing the story as a novel while living in London. He says he was 80–90 pages into it when contacted by producer-director Mark Robson, who was looking for a World War II adventure. Robson read the pages and enjoyed the story. He wanted to buy the film rights but asked for Cleary to do the script first. He worked on the script during 1966 and in August of that year said the film was likely to be made in the Philippines or Jamaica. (Cleary also sold Robson a story I Remember Jack Hoxie about a special effects man in the Middle East.)

In November 1966 Cleary was then turning the script into a novel. He said "I am actually filling out the bones of a scenario and I find it harder to write than any other book I've done. It is like working backwards." Cleary said he based the story on research and his own experiences fighting in Syria. "It was the same sort of fighting, all over and around civilians. It is in a way concerned with the beginning of the Vietnam thing, and the whole Asian problem, though I don't presume to know my way around that quicksand. I'm as confused as hell, like everyone else. But this is the first time I've had to write to a deadline with a book, which is probably helping to make it difficult."

The film was going to be called Escape Route and Robson hoped to star Paul Newman, but no movie was made.

The novel was published in 1967 by Collins in UK, and William Morrow in US.
