= Man's Estate =

1972 novel by Jon Cleary

- First UK edition
- Author: Jon Cleary
- Language: English
- Publisher: Collins (UK); William Morrow (US)
- Publication date: 1972
- Publication place: Australia
- Pages: 352 pp.
- Preceded by: Mask of the Andes
- Followed by: Ransom

Man's Estate is a 1972 novel written by Australian author Jon Cleary set in the world of the British upper class.

It was also known as The Ninth Marquess in the US.

== Synopsis ==
The novel concerns a conservative British politician who survives World War II, the King David Hotel bombing, a Mau Mau attack and a horse riding accident. It was also known as The Ninth Marquess in the US.

== Publication history ==
After the novels' initial publication by Collins in UK and William Morrow in US it was reprinted by Fontana in UK in 1974.

The novel was also translated into German in 1973, and Portuguese and Dutch in 1974.

== See also ==
- 1972 in Australian literature
