= Back of Sunset =

Book by Jon Cleary

- First edition
- Author: Jon Cleary
- Language: English
- Publisher: Collins
- Publication date: 1959
- Publication place: Australia
- Pages: 320
- Preceded by: The Green Helmet
- Followed by: Strike Me Lucky

Back of Sunset is a 1959 Australian novel from Jon Cleary.

The novel was serialised in the Sydney Morning Herald in 1959.

== Premise ==
The novel follows Dr Stephen McCabe, a Sydney doctor who takes a working holiday with the Royal Flying Doctor Service in Western Australia. When the doctor who runs the practice is injured, McCabe must step up in his absence as he deals with a variety of crises.

== Reception ==
The book received good reviews abroad. The Canberra Times called it a "potboiler". The Age called it "a bad novel but it will make excellent film".

The Bulletin called it "a most adroitly dramatised story... Cleary has become pretty well faultless in the contrivances which push a novel on easily and smoothly", adding that it was, "a first-rate novel in the field of fictional journalism, in which characteristic types are photographed against a carefully-studied background which has value as news. When the job is done as successfully as this is, it is hard to say what more could be required — less of the feeling, perhaps, that the author is the manager of a modelling-agency. Nevertheless, for such novels to support an Australian author in the style to which Jon Cleary is becoming accustomed is a step towards a necessary sophistication for our writing."

== Film adaptation ==
Jon Cleary also wrote a film script of the book for producer Lawrence Bachman but no movie resulted.

== See also ==
- 1959 in Australian literature
