= The Green Helmet (novel) =

1957 novel by Australian author Jon Cleary

- Title page for The Green Helmet (1957)
- Author: Jon Cleary
- Language: English
- Genre: Novel
- Publisher: Collins
- Publication date: 1957
- Publication place: Australia
- Media type: Print
- Pages: 266 pp.
- Preceded by: Justin Bayard
- Followed by: Back of Sunset

The Green Helmet is a 1957 novel by the Australian author Jon Cleary. It was the author's eighth novel.

== Synopsis ==
Brothers Ham and Taz Rafferty are professional race car drivers whose father was killed during the Mille Miglia, a 1000-mile endurance race through Italy. The boys' mother extracts a promise from Taz that he will allow Ham to drive while he bides his time. But tension builds between the two when Ham refuses to retire after a near-disaster. An American tire manufacturer contracts Ham to race on his tires and a romance ensues between Ham and the American's daughter.

== Background ==
Cleary had written a book about Australian politics, The Mayor's Nest, but his English publisher was worried it would not appeal to an international audience, and suggested a book on motor racing.

Cleary and his wife had lived in Italy for a year and became familiar with the motor races there such as the Mille Miglia. He had not written in six months, so moved to Valencia, a small town in Spain where he rented a villa. He wrote the novel in twenty days at a chapter a day.

== Publishing history ==
After its initial publication in UK by Collins in 1957, it was reprinted as follows:

- 1958, USA, William Morrow and Company
- 1963, Australia, Howitz
- 1970, UK, Collins
- 1988, UK, Fontana

== Critical reception ==
The book became a best seller on its publication in 1957. Cleary says Reader's Digest paid an advance of 20,000 pounds for their editions.

Kirkus Reviews was not impressed with the work: "Superb suspense in the racing aspects; the romance is contrived and two-dimensional."

A reviewer in The Bulletin found a lot more to like about the author's "swift and clear presentations of scenes in high-class English pubs, New York pent-house apartments, American factories, English country places! Writers with more to say, or less, might well admire the hard-gained discipline of his writing."

== Film adaptation ==
The novel was adapted as a film of the same name in 1961, directed by Michael Forlong with a screenplay by Jon Cleary.

== See also ==
- 1957 in Australian literature
