= Miss Ambar Regrets =

Book by Jon Cleary

- First edition
- Author: Jon Cleary
- Language: English
- Publisher: HarperCollins
- Publication date: 2004
- Publication place: Australia

Miss Ambar Regrets is a 2004 novel from Australian author Jon Cleary, the first new work he published since 1987 which was not a Scobie Malone novel.

The story revolves around a romance between an aspiring actress and a TV journalist. "I like writing about love and I like writing about women," he said of the book in a 2003 interview. "I've done it before, but I thought, goddammit, you've got to be franker now, writing about love, but you don't want to sound like an old man having his jollies."
