= Justin Bayard =

1955 novel by Jon Cleary

- First edition
- Author: Jon Cleary
- Cover artist: Bruce Petty
- Language: English
- Publisher: Collins
- Publication date: 1955
- Publication place: Australia
- Pages: 320pp
- Preceded by: The Climate of Courage
- Followed by: The Green Helmet

Justin Bayard is a 1955 novel by Australian author Jon Cleary about a policeman working in the Kimberley region. It was Cleary's sixth novel.

== Plot ==
Justin Bayard is a mounted policeman in the Kimberley escorting an aboriginal warrior, Emu Foot, back to headquarters at Fitzroy Crossing for murdering another aboriginal. Emu Foot is being pursued by warriors from the Kapunda tribe seeking revenge. Bayard is attacked by Kapundas and is badly injured, despite killing several of them. He takes refuge at an isolated cattle homestead Kootapatamba, owned by Tad Kirkbridge.

Bayard soon realises he has walked into a tense domestic situation: Kirkbridge is unhappily married to the neurotic Julie, who is cheating on him with their neighbour, Crispin, and encouraging him to sell Kootapatamba. The head stock manager is Ned Palady whose mixed race daughter Blanche takes a shine to Bayard. Crispin is trying to persuade Kirkbridge to join him in a new method of transporting cattle. Emu Foot is kept prisoner in a boab tree that has been hollowed out but ultimately escapes.

Bayard falls in love with Blanche and fights off another attack from Kapundas. Julie is killed by a spear to the back and Bayard interrogates members of the homestead. He discovers that the killer is Left Hand Spider, an aboriginal stockman who did not want Julie to see Kootapatamba. Spider is killed fleeing Bayard. Emu Foot is also killed by Kapundas.

Bayard and Blanche get married. Tad Kirkbridge sells the homestead to Blanche and her father and Bayard decides to work on it as head stockman.

== Background ==
Cleary researched the book by visiting the Kimberley in March 1954 with his wife, following an extended period of living overseas.

== Reception ==
The novel was generally well received by critics. and was Cleary's third novel to be published in the US. The reviewer from the New York Times commented that "Mr Cleary knows his trade; he is a shrewd and intelligent operator. But I wish he would set his heights higher."

The Bulletin called it "a considerable improvement over anything he [Cleary] had hitherto done... Beneath it all throbs the steady pulse of the great engines of the “Saturday Evening Post’’; and if they don’t know how to regulate a popular story, no one does."

It was banned in Ireland.

== Film adaptation ==
The novel was later filmed as Dust in the Sun (1958), which relocated the action to the Northern Territory. Cleary had little to do with the film even though director Lee Robinson had worked for him in the Army; as late as 2006 he claimed he had never seen it.

== Radio ==
The novel was serialised on radio in 1956 with Ray Barrett reading it.

== See also ==
- 1955 in Australian literature
