= Safe house (disambiguation) =

A safe house is a place of refuge.

Safe house may also refer to:

== Books ==
- The Safe House (1975 novel), a 1975 novel by Jon Cleary
- Safe House, a 2002 novel in the 1-800-WHERE-R-U series by Meg Cabot
- Safe House, a 2006 novel by James Heneghan

== Film and television ==
- Safe House (1998 film), a television film starring Patrick Stewart
- Safe House, a 2002 television film starring David Westhead
- Safe House (2012 film), an action film starring Denzel Washington and Ryan Reynolds
- Safe House (2025 film), an action thriller film starring Lucien Laviscount, Hannah John-Kamen and Lewis Tan
- Safe House (2025 Norwegian film), a drama thriller film directed by Eirik Svensson, based on Lindis Hurum's autobiography
- Safe House (TV series), a 2015 British television series
- "Safe House" (The Americans), a television episode
- "Safe House" (Brooklyn Nine-Nine), a television episode
- "Safe House" (Supernatural), a television episode

== Other ==
- Safe House Records, a defunct New Hampshire-based record label
- Safehouse Records, an American record label founded in 2015
- "Safe House", a song by All That Remains from the album Madness, 2017
- SafeHouse (restaurant), a spy-themed restaurant in Milwaukee, Wisconsin, US
