= The Country of Marriage =

Book by Jon Cleary

Strike Me Lucky
- First UK edition
- Author: Jon Cleary
- Language: English
- Publisher: Collins (UK); William Morrow (US)
- Publication date: 1962
- Publication place: Australia
- Preceded by: North from Thursday
- Followed by: Forests of the Night

The Country of Marriage is a 1962 novel written by Jon Cleary.

== Synopsis ==
The novel concerns the marriage between Adam Nash and his wife Belle and their decision whether to leave England, where they have lived for seventeen years and raised three teenages, and go back to Belle's country, Australia, where they had met during World War II.

Cleary wrote a number of screen versions of the novel but it has never been filmed.

== Critical reception ==
In The Bulletin a reviewer found the novel "boring". They continued: "Apart from the difficulty of being interested by the problems of a garrulous group of materialistic middle-class nonentities, its manner is, if I may coin a word, 'Yawny."
