= The Long Shadow (Cleary novel) =

Novel by Jon Cleary

- First edition
- Author: Jon Cleary
- Language: English
- Genre: Thriller
- Publisher: Invincible Press
- Publication date: 1949
- Publication place: Australia

The Long Shadow is a 1949 novel from Australian author Jon Cleary.

Cleary had just written his debut work, You Can't See 'Round Corners and was unsure what to do as a follow-up. His editor Graham Greene suggested he try his hand at a thriller "because it will teach you the art of narrative and it will teach you the uses of brevity."

== Plot ==
The plot revolves around Martin Brown, an educated man who is living as a swagman. He is falsely accused of murder of a woman called Ruth Taylor, and is pursued through the Australian countryside by police and other men. He falls in love with a woman who believes his innocence.

== Reception ==
Reviews were not as strong as that for Cleary's first novel.

== Proposed film ==
Reportedly Paramount were interested in the film rights in 1946.

In 1968 it was announced that a movie version was to be made starring Rod Taylor for Ajax Films from a script by James Workman but no film resulted.

== See also ==
- The Long Shadow at AustLit (subscription required)
- 1949 in Australian literature
