= 1949 in Australian literature =

This article presents a list of the historical events and publications of Australian literature during 1949.

== Books ==
- James Aldridge – The Diplomat
- Martin Boyd – Such Pleasure
- Jon Cleary – The Long Shadow
- Charmian Clift & George Johnston – High Valley
- Dale Collins – Simple Simon Smith
- Jean Devanny – Cindie : A Chronicle of the Canefields
- Lawson Glassop – Lucky Palmer
- Adrian Lawlor – Horned Capon
- Philip Lindsay
  - All That Glitters
  - The Loves of My Lord Admiral
- Alan Marshall – How Beautiful Are Thy Feet
- Ruth Park – Poor Man's Orange
- E. V. Timms – The Pathway of the Sun
- June Wright – So Bad a Death

== Short stories ==
- Vance Palmer – "Mathieson's Wife"
- Dal Stivens – "The Pepper Tree"
- Judah Waten – "Neighbours"

== Poetry ==
- John Blight – "Into the Ark"
- David Campbell – Speak With the Sun
- Rosemary Dobson
  - "Ampersand"
  - "Child with a Cockatoo"
  - "The Missal"
- Geoffrey Dutton – "Wool-Shed Dance"
- Nan McDonald – "Wet Summer : Botanic Gardens"
- Kenneth Mackenzie – "Table-Birds"
- Elizabeth Riddell
  - "News of a Baby"
  - "Wakeful in the Township"
- Roland Robinson – Language of the Sand : Poems
- David Rowbotham – "Nine O'Clock : By the Bunya Mountains"
- Douglas Stewart
  - "Nodding Greenhood"
  - "Terra Australis"
- Judith Wright
  - "The Old Prison"
  - Woman to Man

== Drama ==
=== Theatre ===
- Max Afford – Dark Enchantment

== Awards and honours ==
=== Literary ===
Award	Author	Title	Publisher
ALS Gold Medal	Percival Serle	Dictionary of Australian Biography	Angus and Robertson

=== Children's and Young Adult ===
Award	Category	Author	Title	Publisher
Children's Book of the Year Award	Older Readers	No competition		

=== Poetry ===
Award	Author	Title	Publisher
Grace Leven Prize for Poetry	Judith Wright	Woman to Man	Angus and Robertson

== Births ==
A list, ordered by date of birth (and, if the date is either unspecified or repeated, ordered alphabetically by surname) of births in 1949 of Australian literary figures, authors of written works or literature-related individuals follows, including year of death.

- 8 February – Nigel Krauth, novelist and academic
- 22 March – Alan Gould, novelist
- 7 April – Jennifer Maiden, poet
- 30 April – Nadia Wheatley, biographer and writer for children
- 15 August – Garry Disher, novelist
- 6 November – Barry Dickins, author and playwright (died 2026)

Unknown date

- Ken Bolton, poet
- Judith Brett, historian and academic
- Steven Carroll, novelist
- Jennifer Compton, poet and playwright (in New Zealand)
- Laurie Duggan, poet
- John Jenkins, poet
- Don Watson, author

== Deaths ==
A list, ordered by date of death (and, if the date is either unspecified or repeated, ordered alphabetically by surname) of deaths in 1949 of Australian literary figures, authors of written works or literature-related individuals follows, including year of birth.

- 3 April — Ada Augusta Holman, journalist and novelist (born 1869)
- 15 August – Roderic Quinn, poet (born 1867)
- 16 September – Marion Knowles, novelist, poet and journalist (born 1865)
- 11 October – Sydney Ure Smith, publisher (born 1887)

== See also ==
- 1949 in Australia
- 1949 in literature
- 1949 in poetry
- List of years in Australian literature
- List of years in literature
