= These Small Glories =

Short story collection by Australian author Jon Cleary

- First edition
- Author: Jon Cleary
- Language: English
- Genre: short stories
- Publisher: Angus and Robertson
- Publication date: 1946
- Publication place: Australia

These Small Glories was a collection of short stories by Australian author Jon Cleary which was published in 1946.

The stories were set during World War II, during which Cleary had served in the Australian army.

== Stories ==
- "A Long Time Dying"
- "Good-bye, My Darling"
- "Miss England"
- "Journey for Revenge"
- "You Gotta be Modest"
- "Reunion"
- "Homecoming"
- "The Magnificent Czech"
- "The Convert"
- "Debut"

== Background ==
In 1940 Cleary joined the A.I.F. and served in the Middle East. While in the Middle East he began writing a series of short stories, founded mostly on fact, which were published in Australian magazines. His short stories were accepted' in American magazines like "The Cosmopolitan" and "The Saturday Evening Post." He later joined the Army Military History Unit and served in New Guinea, where he wrote his first novel You Can't See Round Corners.

== Reception ==
The Age book reviewer said since Cleary "finds the love between some of the men and women as fine as the self sacrifice of others, and has so much craftsmanship that he is able to give dramatic glory to stories that might have been harrowing, he will bring to his readers realisation of what the people of the fighting services have done."

The Advertiser said "Mr. Cleary's writing is spare and polished; he shows himself a really good craftsman."

The Newcastle Herald said "Cleary's prose is economical and rhythmical-crisp, at times, without becoming staccato. He has an eye for colour and detail."

The Sydney Morning Herald said "Like so many books which reach a reviewer these days, the praises of the dust jacket far outstrip the qualities of the stories" but said "Cleary's tales are pleasantly easy to read. He is not yet a Dal Stivens or a Cecil Mann; but then again he has written better stories than those presented here. He has a flair for characterisation."

The Bulletin said "Essentially both readable and likeable, with humor, color and a true appreciation of the heroic, Mr. Cleary is spoiling his writing by a succession of tiny lapses enfeebling the impact of the whole."

== See also ==
- 1946 in Australian literature
