= Phoenix tree =

(The) Phoenix tree may refer to:

- Phoenix (plant), a genus of palm species
- Paulownia, a genus of Asian deciduous trees, known as "phoenix tree" in some Asian cultures
- Firmiana simplex, or Chinese parasol tree, sometimes known as "phoenix tree"
- Delonix regia, sometimes known as "golden phoenix tree"
- The Phoenix Tree (EP), 2007 EP by Japanese post-rock band Mono
- The Phoenix Tree (novel), 1984 novel by Australian author Jon Cleary
- The Phoenix Tree and Other Stories, 1990 short story collection by Satoko Kizaki
