= North from Thursday =

Book by Jon Cleary

- First edition
- Author: Jon Cleary
- Language: English
- Publisher: Collins
- Publication date: 1960
- Publication place: Australia
- Pages: 384pp
- Preceded by: Strike Me Lucky
- Followed by: The Country of Marriage

North from Thursday is a 1960 novel from Australian author Jon Cleary. It is set in New Guinea and concerns the eruption of a volcano, forcing a group of survivors to flee across the country. The story is based on the 1951 eruption of Mount Lamington.

Cleary was motivated to write the novel because he was interested in exploring the concept of Australia as a colonial power and researched the book by visiting New Guinea with his wife. He went on a patrol in the Highlands.

== Reception ==
The novel was not a big seller in Australia but did well in other countries. It was optioned for the movies but a film version proved too expensive to raise finance.

== Adaptation ==
The novel was serialised in the Sydney Morning Herald and was adapted for radio in 1963.
