= Slit Trench =

1943 Australian radio play

- Genre: drama play
- Running time: 30 mins
- Country of origin: Australia
- Language: English
- Hosted by: ABC
- Written by: Joe Booker
- Original release: July 1943

Slit Trench is a 1943 Australian radio play by Joe Booker.

The play won first prize in the 1943 ABC Armed Forces writing competition. Booker was an officer in the RAAF. There had been 75 entries including Debut from Jon Cleary. Judges included Leslie Rees, Fred Clewlow and Lawrence Cecil. The ABC bought the play and broadcast it.

The play was repeated in 1943 and performed again in 1944.
