= Maybe This Time (1980 film) =

...Maybe This Time
- Directed by: Chris McGill
- Written by: Bob Ellis; Anne Brooksbank
- Produced by: Brian Kavanagh
- Starring: Judy Morris
- Cinematography: Russell Boyd
- Edited by: Wayne LeClos
- Music by: Bruce Smeaton
- Production companies: NSW Film Corporation; Cherrywood Film Productions
- Distributed by: Roadshow
- Release date: August 1980
- Running time: 96 mins
- Country: Australia
- Language: English
- Budget: AU $460,000

...Maybe This Time is a 1980 Australian feature film starring Bill Hunter, Mike Preston, Ken Shorter and Judy Morris. It was the first feature directed by Chris McGill.

It was the feature film debut of stage/TV actor Jill Perryman.

== Plot ==
Fran, the assistant to university professor Paddy, is about to turn 30. She is having an affair with a married minister's aide, Stephen. She returns home to the country town she grew up in and has a fling with an old flame, Alan. She also begins sleeping with Paddy.

== Cast ==
- Judy Morris as Fran
- Bill Hunter as Stephen
- Mike Preston as Paddy
- Jill Perryman as Mother
- Ken Shorter as Alan
- Michele Fawdon as Margo
- Leonard Teale as Minister
- Jude Kuring as Meredith
- Rod Mullinar as Jack
- Chris Haywood as Salesman
- Brian Moll as Older Salesman
- Lyndall Barbour as Miss Bates
- Lorna Lesley as Suzy Williams
- John Clayton as Estare Agent
- Lyn Collingwood as Myrtle
- Les Foxcroft as MP 2

== Production ==
Bob Ellis says it took him five years to get the film made and that it was turned down by Gillian Armstrong, Stephen Wallace, Tony Buckley, Donald Crombie, Ken Hannam, David Stevens and Brian Bell. He then re-wrote it and managed to persuade the New South Wales Film Corporation to back it, although the NSWFC were the ones who picked the producer and director. They also insisted that the lead be played by Judy Morris, Helen Morse or Wendy Hughes.

Ellis later complained that all references in the script to Gough Whitlam had to be cut out of the first third of the film because the New South Wales Film Corporation was not seen to be biased towards Whitlam. He thought this destroyed the structure of the scenes and "as a result, the first 10 minutes of the film was wrecked, and the film will lose money."

Ellis says that the part played by Mike Preston was written for Jack Thompson and felt Judy Morris was miscast because she "looks too beautiful to have these problems, and the correct choice would have been somebody like Anna Volska or Michelle Fawdon." However he did like Morris' performance.

Morris later said of her character:

Fran is a woman who feels pushed into a corner. She is approaching 30, a time when many women being to feel their options are running out. She has passed through a sexual liberation stage but has found that this has not provided a solution. What she wants is a total commitment with a man.

The film was shot over six weeks starting in November 1979. Its original title was Letters from a Friend.

== Release ==
The film was not a success at the box office. However the script by Bob Ellis and Anne Brooksbank won an AWGIE for best original feature film screenplay.
