= A Sound of Lightning =

Book by Jon Cleary

- First US edition
- Author: Jon Cleary
- Language: English
- Publisher: Collins (UK); William Morrow (US)
- Publication date: 1976
- Publication place: Australia

A Sound of Lightning is a 1976 novel written by Australian author Jon Cleary and set in Montana.

Cleary lived in Montana for several months to research the book.
