= The Easy Sin =

Book by Jon Cleary

- First edition
- Author: Jon Cleary
- Language: English
- Series: Scobie Malone
- Genre: Detective
- Publisher: HarperCollins
- Publication date: 2002
- Publication place: Australia
- Preceded by: Yesterday's Shadow
- Followed by: Degrees of Connection

The Easy Sin is a 2002 novel from Australian author Jon Cleary. It was the nineteenth (and penultimate) book featuring Sydney detective Scobie Malone. The plot concerns the murder of a housemaid to a dot com millionaire. Kidnappers thought they have grabbed the millionaire's girlfriend, not realising they've taken the millionaire instead. Matters are complicated by the involvement of the Yakuza.
