= Dragons at the Party =

Book by Jon Cleary

- First UK edition
- Author: Jon Cleary
- Language: English
- Series: Scobie Malone
- Genre: Detective
- Publisher: Collins (UK); William Morrow (US)
- Publication date: 1987
- Publication place: Australia
- Preceded by: Ransom
- Followed by: Now and Then, Amen

Dragons at the Party is a 1987 novel from Australian author Jon Cleary. It was the fourth book featuring Sydney homicide detective Scobie Malone, and marked the character's first appearance in print in fourteen years.

== Background ==
Cleary did not originally intended to turn Scobie Malone into a long-running series. However, after his daughter's death in 1987 his wife fell ill, and Cleary was not able to travel as widely as he liked in order to research his novels. This forced him to write about Sydney and he thought that returning to the crime genre was a way to write about Australia while still appealing to the international market. The novel was a success and Cleary concentrated on writing Malone adventures until 2003.

== Synopsis ==
The novel is set in 1988 with the background of the Australian Bicentenary. President Timori of the fictitious Pacific country the Spice Islands has been deposed in a coup and granted asylum in Australia. His aide is murdered in a bullet meant for the President and Malone must find the assassin before he strikes again.

== Reception ==
The novel was generally well reviewed. Fellow crime writer Peter Corris said that "younger writers could learn a lot from Jon Cleary: how to draw a credible character with a few strokes, how to keep a story moving, build suspense and satisfy every real reader's desire for good writing... [The book] contains some of the best action sequences I've read in years and the dialogue is always crisp and effective."
