= The Fall of an Eagle =

1965 novel by Jon Cleary

- First UK edition
- Author: Jon Cleary
- Language: English
- Publisher: Collins (UK); William Morrow (US)
- Publication date: 1965
- Publication place: Australia
- Pages: 255

The Fall of an Eagle is a 1965 novel written by Australian author Jon Cleary set in Anatolia. The hero is an American engineer building a dam.

== Critical reception ==
Allen Glover in The Sydney Morning Herald had some problems with the novel: "Mr Cleary is a good storyteller and his tale holds together well, even if some of his techniques are somewhat old-fashioned. For instance, he still clings to authorial omnipotence, reading his characters' thoughts as well as observing their actions and recording their speech...Mr Cleary seems to have devised his plot carefully and then asked a theatrical agency to provide him with stock characters to appear in the various roles."

== Film adaptation ==
At one stage producer Audrey Baring was going to make a movie out of the book but although Cleary did a script none was made.
