= Ransom (Cleary novel) =

Book by Jon Cleary

- First UK edition
- Author: Jon Cleary
- Language: English
- Series: Scobie Malone
- Genre: Detective
- Publisher: Collins (UK); William Morrow (US)
- Publication date: 1973
- Publication place: Australia
- Preceded by: Helga's Web
- Followed by: Dragons at the Party

Ransom was a 1973 novel by Australian author Jon Cleary, the third to feature his detective hero Scobie Malone. Cleary also wrote The Sundowners and The High Commissioner. The novel was published by Fontana Press on November 3, 1975.

== Plot ==
Scobie is on honeymoon in New York with his new wife Lisa, who he first met during the time of The High Commissioner. Lisa goes to visit the dentist at the same time as Sylvia Forte, wife of the mayor of New York, Michael Forte. They are in the lift together when anarchists kidnap Sylvia, grabbing Lisa as well. The anarchists, led by Carole Cox and Abel Simmons, demand the release of five of their compatriots from prison, where they have been gaoled for detonating a bomb that killed two policemen.

Malone wants Forte to give the kidnappers what they want but he is reluctant to give in as he has been running on a law and order platform for the mayoral elections, which are being held the next day. A mysterious man, Frank Padua, offers to help Forte but he refuses because of Padua's reputed links to the Mafia. Malone, accompanied by Detective Jefferson, goes to see Padua and forces him with threats to reveal who he is working for – Mafia leader Don Auguste Giuffre. Giuffre, who is keen to see the Italian Forte win the election, gives Malone and Jefferson some valuable clues that help them figure out the identity of the head kidnapper. They realise Carole is from a wealthy family and is the sister of one of the imprisoned bombers; she is also seeking revenge for the death of her husband in a student demonstration.

Malone and Jefferson locate the house where Lisa and Sylvia are being kidnapped. A tense stand off results in a motorcade travelling to the airport with the kidnap victims followed by the police, media and FBI. Eventually Malone overpowers Abel and Lisa and Sylvia are rescued. Michael Forte wins the election and Scobie and Lisa return to Australia.

== Background ==
Cleary wanted to write about the use of force and violence in politics. His spark for the novel was wondering about what would happen if a prominent politician or his wife were kidnapped. He also wanted to write about Scobie Malone again, and having his wife kidnapped would make him personally involved.

"It brought in an interesting moral dilemma — a strict law-and-order cop in a helpless and seemingly hopeless situation, involving someone he loves", said Cleary. "How would be react? What would be learn about himself?"

== Reception ==
The film rights were bought by Lewis Gilbert, who ultimately did not end up making a movie – according to Cleary, this was due in part to opposition from the office of John Lindsay, then Mayor of New York. However, the book was adapted twice for Japanese television.

Despite the success of the novel, Cleary did not want to be trapped into writing Scobie Malone adventures so there was a fourteen-year break before the character reappeared in Dragons at the Party.
