= Bleak Spring =

Book by Jon Cleary

- First UK edition
- Author: Jon Cleary
- Language: English
- Series: Scobie Malone
- Genre: Detective
- Publisher: HarperCollins (UK); William Morrow (US)
- Publication date: 1993
- Publication place: Australia
- Preceded by: Dark Summer
- Followed by: Autumn Maze

Bleak Spring is a 1993 novel from Australian author Jon Cleary. It was the tenth book featuring Sydney detective Scobie Malone.

== Story outline ==
The story centers on the murder of a solicitor who Scobie knew, and whose son happens to be dating Scobie's daughter, Claire. It turns out the lawyer had links to a bookmaker, an offshore bank and a dangerous Russian. Like many Cleary novels it featured sport, in this case rugby league.

One reviewer stated that "Cleary writes a solidly entertaining novel, concentrating on the details of routine police investigation and the matey, macho, laconic world of the police team. While the finale may inspire accusations of prejudice, it is a suitably suspenseful climax to a workmanlike slab of adventure fiction."
