= Four-Cornered Circle =

Book by Jon Cleary

- First edition
- Author: Jon Cleary
- Language: English
- Publisher: HarperCollins
- Publication date: 2007
- Publication place: Australia

Four-Cornered Circle is a 2007 novel written by Australian author Jon Cleary, the last published prior to his death in 2010.

== Synopsis ==
The plot revolves around two sisters, one of whom develops feelings for the other's husband. The story is told from the point of view of the sisters, which Cleary admits was a difficult writing challenge as he attempted to avoid portraying the women's thoughts and actions from a male perspective.
