= Helga's Web =

Book by Jon Cleary

- First UK edition
- Author: Jon Cleary
- Language: English
- Series: Scobie Malone series
- Genre: Detective
- Publisher: Collins (UK); William Morrow (US)
- Publication date: 1970
- Publication place: Australia
- Preceded by: The High Commissioner
- Followed by: Ransom

Helga's Web was a 1970 novel by Australian author Jon Cleary, the second to feature his detective hero Scobie Malone.

Cleary did not originally intend to use the character again but wanted to write about the construction of the new Sydney Opera House and thought the detective could be a good way to access that.

== Reception ==
The London Daily Telegraph called it "absorbing to the end."

The Sydney Morning Herald called it a "first class, exciting, immensely readable thriller."

== Adaptation ==
The novel was adapted into a film as Scobie Malone (1975).
