= High Road to China (novel) =

Book by Jon Cleary

- First US edition
- Author: Jon Cleary
- Language: English
- Publisher: Collins (UK); William Morrow (US)
- Publication date: 1977
- Publication place: Australia

High Road to China is a 1977 novel by Australian author Jon Cleary.

== Plot ==
Set in the 1920s, the plot concerns heiress Eve Tozer who hires two pilots to help her fly from England to China in an effort to rescue her kidnapped father, Bradley.

== Adaptation ==
Film rights were bought almost immediately and plans were announced to star Roger Moore and Jacqueline Bisset under the direction of John Huston. Cleary turned down the chance to do the adaption as he did not want to work with John Huston in Ireland for several months. Huston dropped out and was replaced by Sidney Furie then eventually Brian G. Hutton. The novel was eventually filmed in 1983, with a large number of changes made, notably the removal of the German character. Cleary regarded the adaptation as one of the greatest disappointments in his career because he thought the book could have made "one of the great adventure films".
