= A Different Turf =

Book by Jon Cleary

- First UK edition
- Author: Jon Cleary
- Language: English
- Series: Scobie Malone
- Genre: Detective
- Publisher: HarperCollins (UK); William Morrow (US)
- Publication date: 1997
- Publication place: Australia
- Preceded by: Endpeace
- Followed by: Five Ring Circus

A Different Turf is a 1997 novel from Australian author Jon Cleary, the fourteenth book featuring Sydney detective Scobie Malone. A series of gay bashings have taken place throughout Sydney and someone is murdering the culprits. Cleary explored the psychology of serial killers from Australia's leading police profiler, Inspector Bronwyn Killmier, who inspired the character of Tilly Orbost.

== Background ==
Cleary was inspired to write the book after receiving criticism for a letter he wrote to the Sydney Morning Herald complaining about the amount of attention given to people who died of AIDS compared to other diseases. Cleary wrote that:

We lost our daughter, at 37, to breast cancer after she had fought it for 3 years. There was no torchlight procession for her or similar victims; no quilts stitched; no vote-grabbing politician appeared at our door with a lighted candle. We kept our grief private, up till now. One person a day dies in Australia of AIDS. Six women die every day in this country of breast cancer. One has a natural sympathy for AIDS sufferers, but people are dying all over the world every day, of a variety of diseases, of malnutrition, of political persecution. None of them, it seems, is fortunate enough to have the vocal and media support that the AIDS unfortunates seem able to muster."

The letter was controversial and made Cleary reflect whether he should reconsider his attitudes. He thought he could use the format of a Scobie Malone book to explore the gay community of Sydney. Cleary:

I went to the police gay and lesbian liaison unit and explained the moral baggage of my generation, but that I wanted to be as impartial as I could. They were very helpful. The book is a polemic about justice and respect for the other side. I don't go to gay bars and the sleaze ball but I write about the love that is in homosexuality. I don't paint Scobie Malone as an uncritical observer of the scene. There's so much of me in Malone. My prejudices are his. He gets rid of his in the book.

Cleary says writing the book made him more sympathetic to the gay cause.

== Reception ==
Reviewer Stuart Coupe wrote that:

It must be said that with the Malone series Cleary has become a touch erratic, as has Ed McBain with his 87th Precinct series and Elmore Leonard with whatever fascinates him at the time. The books are never less than enjoyable but often read as though they've been produced out of habit rather than having any new territory to explore. But when he's "on", Cleary is very, very on - and A Different Turf is arguably the finest achievement of this long-running series.
