= A Flight of Chariots =

1963 novel by Jon Cleary

- First US edition
- Author: Jon Cleary
- Language: English
- Publisher: Collins (UK); William Morrow (US)
- Publication date: 1963
- Publication place: Australia

A Flight of Chariots is a 1963 novel written by Australian author Jon Cleary.

== Synopsis ==
The novel follows two friends who fly planes during the Berlin Airlift and Korean War then become involved in the space program.

== Critical reception ==
Andrew Leslie, writing in The Guardian, noted: "There is nothing tortuous or particularly subtle about A Flight of Chariots..By the end mr Cleary has succeeded in his object of showing that a recognisable human being is up there in orbit. No especially new insights of thought or feeling have been opened up; but the familiar view has been professionally rendered."
