= Ken Shorter =

Australian actor (1945–2024)

- Born: Kenneth Shorter; 1945
- Died: November 2024 (aged 79)
- Occupation: Actor
- Years active: 1966–2018
- Known for: Ned Kelly (1970); Stone (1974)

Kenneth Shorter (1945 – November 2024) was an Australian actor.

Shorter's career spanned theatre, television and film, but he was best known for starring opposite Mick Jagger in a film adaptation of Ned Kelly (1970), as the title character in the cult biker film Stone (1974) and in American fantasy film Dragonslayer (1981).

== Early life ==
Shorter was born in 1945, and worked as a police officer and truck driver before becoming an actor.

== Career ==
In 1967, he commenced playing the character of Frankie McCoy on the Seven Network series You Can't See 'Round Corners. He later reprised the role for the 1969 theatrical film adaption.

It was announced in 1969 that Shorter had been cast as Aaron Sherritt in the film Ned Kelly, in which he starred alongside Mick Jagger.

In the early 1970s, Shorter was a member of Sydney's Old Tote Theatre Company and appeared in several of the company's productions including Lasseter, The Man of Mode, The Government Inspector and The Legend of King O'Malley. Shorter also starred in numerous theatre productions throughout the UK from 1972 to 2010.

In 1974, Shorter was cast in his best known role as the title character in the low-budget cult biker film Stone, which has often been cited as inspiration for the Max Max series. That same year, he played a fictional New South Wales rugby league player called Frank Scully in The Forward Pack which was written by Robert Caswell and was one of four Sunday night television plays broadcast by ABC TV. In 1975, he appeared in the outback drama film Sunday Too Far Away as Frankie Davis. And in 1981, he played a henchmen guard in the American fantasy film Dragonslayer. He was also part of the cast for the 2000 Hollywood film Dragonheart: A New Beginning.

Shorter's many Australian television credits included a regular role (as Duncan Ross) in Bellbird (1968), a presenter role on children's series Play School (1969–1982) and a recurring role in Number 96 (1977). He also had guest roles in Skippy the Bush Kangaroo, Homicide, Matlock Police, Riptide, Boney, Division 4 and G.P..

In the UK, he appeared in The Bill, Casualty, Holby City and the TV movie Persuasion.

== Death ==
After a health decline, Shorter retired from acting in 2018. He died in November 2024, aged 79.

== Filmography ==
=== Film ===
Year	Title	Role	Type
1969	You Can't See 'round Corners	Frankie McCoy	
1970	Ned Kelly	Aaron Sherritt	
1974	Moving On	Alan	
1974	Stone	Stone	
1975	Sunday Too Far Away	Frankie Davis	
1980	Maybe This Time	Alan	
1981	Dragonslayer	Henchman	
1981	4D Special Agents	Eddie	
1982	Scrubbers	Rex	
1983	The Ploughman's Lunch	Squash Coach	
1998	Praise	Male Nurse	
2000	Dragonheart: A New Beginning	King	Direct to video film
2018	Sink	Vic	

=== Television ===
Year	Title	Role	Type
1967	Adventures of the Seaspray	Second Youth	1 episode
1967	You Can't See 'Round Corners	Frankie McCoy	26 episodes
1968	Bellbird	Duncan Ross	83 episodes
1969	Riptide	Ross	1 episode
1969	Skippy the Bush Kangaroo	Tim	1 episode
1969	Division 4	Dave Gibbs	1 episode
1966–1972	Play School	Presenter	31 episodes
1968; 1970	Homicide	Rod Smith / Danny Baker	2 episodes
1969	Australian Plays: The Torrents	Kingsley Myers	TV play
1971	Matlock Police	Martin Daly	1 episode
1972	The Resistible Rise of Arturo Ui		TV movie
1973	Boney	Vic Vickery	1 episode
1974	The Forward Pack	Frank Scully	TV movie
1977	Number 96	Duncan Swann	4 episodes
1979	Leave Him to Heaven	Eddie	TV movie
1979	Ripping Yarns	1st Mutinous Officer	1 episode
1985; 1996	Casualty	Musician / John	2 episodes
1987	Rockliffe's Babies	Lorry Driver	1 episode
1990; 1991; 1998	The Bill	Donald Varney / William Mobley / Heckler	3 episodes
1992	G.P.	Paul Ricketson	1 episode
1995	Persuasion	Lady Dalrymple's Butler	TV movie
2001	Oscar Charlie	Biker	2 episodes
2007	Holby City	Martin Riley	1 episode

== Stage ==
Year	Title	Role	Type
1966	The Death of Bessie Smith		Ensemble Theatre, Sydney
1966	Burning Bright		Ensemble Theatre, Sydney
1970	Lunchtime		AMP Theatrette, Sydney, Playhouse, Canberra with Q Theatre Company
1970	We Bombed in New Haven		Ensemble Theatre, Sydney, Monash University, Melbourne, Playhouse, Canberra
1971	As You Like It	Orlando	UNSW, Old Tote Theatre, Sydney
1971	The Man of Mode		UNSW, Old Tote Theatre, Sydney
1971	The National Health or Nurse Norton's Affair		UNSW, Old Tote Theatre, Sydney
1971	Lasseter		UNSW, Old Tote Theatre, Sydney
1972	Cash	Martin	Theatre Royal, Hobart with Tasmanian Theatre Company
1972	Major Barbara	Charles Lomax	Theatre Royal, Hobart with Tasmanian Theatre Company
1972	The Legend of King O'Malley		Civic Theatre, Fiji, Mercury Theatre, Auckland, Star Boating Club, Wellington, Hunter Theatre The Junction, Sydney with Old Tote Theatre Company
1972	Don's Party	Circus Style Performer	Jane Street Theatre, Sydney with NIDA
1972–1973	The Royal Hunt of the Sun		The Old Vic tour
1974	The Bride of Gospel Place		Arts Theatre, Adelaide with STCSA
1974	An Adelaide Anthology 1836–1900		Edmund Wright House, Adelaide with STCSA
1977	The Red Devil Battery Sign		The Roundhouse, London, Phoenix Theatre, London
1979	Bent	Greta	Royal Court Theatre, London, Criterion Theatre, London
1983	Gossip from the Forest	Captain Vanselow	Sydney Opera House with STC
1984	A Patriot for Me	Col. Mischa Oblensky	Leeds Playhouse
1985	Reluctant Heroes	Sergeant McKenzie	Nottingham Playhouse
1985	Down an Alley Filled with Cats	Standby for Adam Faith	Mermaid Theatre, London with E&B
1986	Wild Honey	Osip	Leeds Playhouse
1986	Amadeus	Groom of the Imperial Chamber	Crucible Theatre, Sheffield
1987–1988	The Comedy of Errors	Gaoler / Officer	UK tour with Royal Shakespeare Company
1988	Hamlet	Barnardo / Player	UK tour with Royal Shakespeare Company
1988	The Constant Couple	Constable / Footman	Swan Theatre, Stratford-upon-Avon with Royal Shakespeare Company
1988	The Immortalist	Performer	The Other Place, Stratford-upon-Avon with Royal Shakespeare Company
1987–1989	Macbeth	Bloody Sergeant / Murderer 2	Royal Shakespeare Theatre, Stratford-upon-Avon, Theatre Royal, Newcastle, Barbican Theatre, London with Royal Shakespeare Company
1988–1989	The Tempest	Boatswain / Spirit; Mariner	Royal Shakespeare Theatre, Stratford-upon-Avon, Barbican Theatre, London, Theatre Royal, Newcastle with Royal Shakespeare Company
1988–1989	The Man Who Came to Dinner	Baker / Westcott	Barbican Theatre, London with Royal Shakespeare Company
1988–1989	King Lear	Captain / Gentleman	The Other Place, Stratford-upon-Avon, Almeida Theatre, London with Royal Shakespeare Company
1989	The Immortalist	Performer	Almeida Theatre, London with Royal Shakespeare Company
1990–1991	Two Shakespearean Actors	Robert Jones	Swan Theatre, Stratford-upon-Avon, Barbican Theatre, London, Pit, London with Royal Shakespeare Company
1989–1991	Much Ado About Nothing	Borachio	Barbican Theatre, London, Theatre Royal, Newcastle with Royal Shakespeare Company
1990–1991	King Lear	Duke of Burgundy / Knight One	Royal Shakespeare Theatre, Stratford-upon-Avon, Barbican Theatre, London, Theatre Royal, Newcastle with Royal Shakespeare Company
1995	Lost in a Mirror	Duke of Ferrara	Southwark Playhouse, London with The Other Company
1998	London Full Circle Productions	Barabbas	Chelsea Centre, London
2000	Baby Doll	Mac	Birmingham Repertory Theatre, Royal National Theatre, Lyttelton, Albery Theatre, London with Promenade Productions / Ambassador Theatre Group
2010	Macbeth	Seyward / Old Man	Shakespeare’s Globe, London
2010	Antony and Cleopatra	Menas / Soldier	Liverpool Playhouse
2014	Other Desert Cities	Lyman	Ensemble Theatre, Sydney
