= Five Ring Circus =

Book by Jon Cleary

- First UK edition
- Author: Jon Cleary
- Language: English
- Series: Scobie Malone
- Genre: Detective
- Publisher: HarperCollins (UK); William Morrow (US)
- Publication date: 1998
- Publication place: Australia
- Preceded by: A Different Turf
- Followed by: Dilemma

Five Ring Circus is a 1998 novel from Australian author Jon Cleary. It was the fifteenth book featuring Sydney detective Scobie Malone and involves his investigation into a financial scam in the lead up to the 2000 Sydney Olympics.

== See also ==
- 1998 in Australian literature
