= A Very Private War =

Book by Jon Cleary

- First UK edition
- Author: Jon Cleary
- Language: English
- Publisher: Collins (Australia/UK); William Morrow (US)
- Publication date: 1980
- Publication place: Australia

A Very Private War is a 1980 novel by Australian writer Jon Cleary about coastwatchers during World War II.

== Plot ==
Mullane, an American coast watcher in New Britain, goes on a mission to uncover the camouflage of the airstrip of a Japanese base. He is accompanied by an Australian officer and captured Japanese officer. Mullane gets the chance to avenge the death of his Japanese wife, killed prior to the war.

== Reception ==
The Sydney Morning Herald wrote "Cleary is neither a stylist nor a profound writer. He is essentially a storyteller, and very good one, most at home in the fields of action and adventure, as A Very Private War demonstrates", calling it "a straightforward, uncomplicated tale of wartime derring-do."

== Proposed Film ==
In 1981 there were reports a film version was in development with the Queensland Film Corporation but no movie resulted.

== See also ==
- 1980 in Australian literature
