= Now and Then, Amen =

Book by Jon Cleary

- First UK edition
- Author: Jon Cleary
- Language: English
- Series: Scobie Malone
- Genre: Detective
- Publisher: Collins (UK); William Morrow (US)
- Publication date: 1988
- Publication place: Australia
- Preceded by: Dragons at the Party
- Followed by: Babylon South

Now and Then, Amen is a 1988 novel from Australian author Jon Cleary. It was the fifth book featuring Sydney homicide detective Scobie Malone. There were plans to adapt the book into a mini-series, but this ended up not happening.

== Synopsis ==
Malone investigates the death of a nun found outside a brothel. She turns out to be the granddaughter of a rich Australian businessman who is determined to see his son become Australia's first Pope. The story explores Sydney during the 1987 stock market crash.
