= High Road to China (film) =

1983 film by Brian G. Hutton

- Theatrical release poster
- Directed by: Brian G. Hutton
- Screenplay by: Sandra Weintraub; S. Lee Pogostin
- Based on: High Road to China by Jon Cleary
- Produced by: Fred Weintraub
- Starring: Tom Selleck; Bess Armstrong; Jack Weston; Wilford Brimley; Robert Morley; Brian Blessed; Cassandra Gava
- Cinematography: Ronnie Taylor
- Edited by: John Jympson
- Music by: John Barry
- Production companies: Golden Harvest Company; City Films; Jadran Film; Pan Pacific Productions
- Distributed by: Warner Bros.
- Release date: March 18, 1983
- Running time: 105 minutes
- Countries: United States; Yugoslavia; Hong Kong
- Language: English
- Budget: $15 million
- Box office: $28.4 million

High Road to China (a.k.a. Raiders of the End of the World) is a 1983 adventure-romance film set in the 1920s starring Tom Selleck in his first major starring role, playing a hard-drinking biplane pilot hired by society heiress Eve "Evie" Tozer (Bess Armstrong) to find her missing father (Wilford Brimley). The supporting cast includes Robert Morley and Brian Blessed. The Golden Harvest film (released by Warner Bros. Pictures) is loosely based on the 1977 novel of the same name by Jon Cleary. However, little beyond character names and the basic premise of an aerial race to China survived the translation to film.

While Brian G. Hutton ended up as the final director, originally, High Road to China was to be helmed by John Huston, and then Sidney J. Furie, before both left the project. The musical score was composed by John Barry. It was the 27th highest-grossing film of 1983, bringing in $28,445,927 at the domestic box office.

== Plot ==
Eve Tozer is a society heiress and flapper living the high-life in 1920s Istanbul. She needs to find her father, Bradley Tozer, before he is officially declared dead or risk losing her inheritance to his scheming business partner, Bentik. She only has 12 days. Eve hires World War I ace pilot Patrick O'Malley and his aircraft. O'Malley is eager to take the job as he needs to leave town rather urgently himself. Eve, also an accomplished pilot, however, is determined to accompany him in his other aircraft, which causes the first of many arguments on the way from Istanbul to China.

Their journey in two biplanes (named "Dorothy" and "Lillian" after the famous Gish silent film star sisters) through six countries leads them to finally find the eccentric Bradley Tozer in China, where he is helping a small village defend itself against a local warlord. Tozer informs O'Malley that all of the patents are in his name, and when he dies, they will be transferred to Eve. She will have all the real wealth when that happens. Also, he does not want to leave the place. The warlord attacks with his troops. Eve flies the remaining plane to help counter the attack. The battle is won, the warlord dies. The plane crashes, and thinking Eve is injured O'Malley rushes to her side. She is alive and well. The two of them kiss.

== Cast ==
- Tom Selleck as Patrick O'Malley
- Bess Armstrong as Eve "Evie" Tozer
- Jack Weston as Struts
- Wilford Brimley as Bradley Tozer
- Robert Morley as Bentik
- Brian Blessed as Suleman Khan
- Sime Jagarinac as Khan's Nephew
- Domagoj Vukusic as Chauffeur
- Cassandra Gava as Alessa
- Peggy Sirr as Alessa's Mother
- Michael Sheard as Charlie
- Lynda La Plante as Lina
- Terry Richards as Ginger
- Robert Lee as Zura
- Shayur Mehta as Ahmed
- Jeremy Child as Silversmith
- Peter Llewellyn Williams as Franjten Khan
- Hai Ching Lim as Tozer's Lieutenant
- Dino Shafeek as Satvinda
- Anthony Chinn as General Wong
- Chua Kahjoo as Wong's Aide
- Timothy Bateson as Alec Wedgeworth
- Wolf Kahler as Von Hess
- Ric Young as Kim Su Lee
- Zdenka Hersak as Countess
- Marc Boyle as Henchman
- Kim Rook Teoh as Wong's Lieutenant
- Daniel Clucas as British Officer
- John Higginson as British Officer
- Simon Prebble as British Officer
- Timothy Carlton as Officer

== Production ==
High Road to China is regarded as one of the "imitators" that populated movie theaters in the years following Raiders of the Lost Ark. However, as in the case of Romancing the Stone, another so-called imitator, the source material actually predated the aforementioned Lucasfilm production by four years. Rumor has it that it was "given" to Selleck as a sort of consolation prize for having to pass on Raiders of the Lost Ark due to scheduling conflicts with Magnum, P.I.

In early development, the film was slated to star Roger Moore and Jacqueline Bisset under the direction of John Huston. Then Huston and Bisset dropped out and Bo Derek was to co star with Moore. The budget was to be $16 million. Then Derek dropped out because she only wanted to be directed by her husband.

Filming for High Road to China took place in Yugoslavia with a crew of 231 (145 Yugoslavs, 60 British, 15 Italians, 10 Americans, and one Frenchman). They also added 50 Yugoslav actors to the speaking cast and hired 4,000 extras. Headquarters for the film company was in the small Adriatic coastal town of Opatija, Croatia, located on the northwest coast of the Gulf of Rijeka at the foot of Učka mountain. It was filmed in Opatija and Istria, Croatia. Scenes set in Afghanistan were shot at Kamenjak near Rijeka, while scenes set in Turkey were filmed at Volosko, and the final battle in China was shot in Boljun.

Originally, Bristol F2B replicas were built by Vernon Ohmert of Ypsilanti, Michigan. This aircraft type was in the novel, but after construction, the replicas were thought to be dangerous to fly at high altitude and were replaced by two Stampe SV-4 biplanes, (G-AZGC and G-AZGE), provided by Bianchi Aviation Film Services.

== Reception ==
High Road to China was the only new wide release on the March 18–20 weekend, and debuted atop the box office with $6,156,049. It eventually grossed over $28 million domestically.

Contemporary critics found the movie to be a substandard imitation of Raiders of the Lost Ark. Roger Ebert gave the film two stars (out of four), writing that it is a "lifeless" movie, "directed at a nice, steady pace, but without flair and without the feeling that anything's being risked."

John Nubbin reviewed High Road to China for Different Worlds magazine and stated that "Possibly before Raiders, High Road could have been a bigger picture. Now it is only a love story, with what seems to be enough action thrown in to keep the kiddies quiet. The problem is that nowadays the adults won't sit still for these types of maneuvers, either. They want just as much action as the kids, but sadly, there is none to be had."

Tom Selleck later recalled:

Patrick O'Malley I'm very fond of ... There were actors at that point who had left a series and started a feature career, but there was no one at that point who was trying to do both at the same time. So that was unique. It also made the jury rather tough, because a lot of people didn't see it that way, so I was walking into an arena where that wasn't accepted. But it's a good movie. It holds up.

Aerofiles, a historical aviation website, considered the film as "Strictly mediocre, with substandard action scenes and the flattest dialogue this side of the Great Wall." Aviation film historian Christian Santoir said: "Arriving two years after 'Raiders of the Lost Ark', 'Raiders of the End of the World' was in the same vein, despite certain missing qualities." Film historian Stephen Pendo found High Road to China "... notable mainly for its aviation sequences, for it lacks character and plot development."

C.J. Henderson reviewed High Road to China in The Space Gamer No. 63. Henderson commented that "Unless one is looking for a pleasant, harmless, non-sexy, non-violent, disinteresting film to take the grandparents to its best to pass this one by."

Christopher John reviewed High Road to China in Ares Magazine #14 and commented that "At best, it's cute, and somewhat endearing, but it's not what people who expect another Raider have in mind. Aside from its breath-taking photography, it is a simple movie which the media people have tried to target for the wrong audience."

=== Honors ===
High Road to China was nominated for the 1984 Saturn Award as Best Fantasy Film, while Bess Armstrong was nominated as Best Actress at the Academy of Science Fiction, Fantasy and Horror Films Festival.

== Home media ==
High Road to China was released on DVD in Australia by Umbrella Entertainment in February 2012. In February 2013, Umbrella Entertainment released the film on Blu-ray.
