= Vortex (Cleary novel) =

1978 novel by Jon Cleary

- First UK edition
- Author: Jon Cleary
- Publisher: Collins (UK); William Morrow (US)
- Publication date: 1978
- Publication place: Australia

Vortex is a 1978 novel written by Australian author Jon Cleary about a tornado attack on a Missouri small town. Cleary wrote a screenplay based on it but no movie resulted.
