= Endpeace =

1996 novel by Jon Cleary

- First UK edition
- Author: Jon Cleary
- Language: English
- Series: Scobie Malone
- Genre: Detective
- Publisher: HarperCollins (UK); William Morrow (US)
- Publication date: 1996
- Publication place: Australia
- Preceded by: Winter Chill
- Followed by: A Different Turf

Endpeace is a 1996 novel from Australian author Jon Cleary. It was the thirteenth book featuring Sydney detective Scobie Malone.

== Plot ==
The book starts with Scobie attending a dinner party held by a publishing tycoon. During the night the tycoon is shot dead and Scobie has to find the killer.

== Background ==
As part of his research for the novel, Cleary visited the offices of the Sydney Morning Herald. However, he denied the publishing family in the book was based on the Fairfaxes, who then owned the Herald.

== Reception ==
Reviewer Stuart Coupe said that, "over recent years Cleary's books have varied in quality but this is a superior effort from an acknowledged master of the genre."
