= Slim De Grey =

Australian actor

- Born: Clifford Frank de Grey; 20 May 1918; Lytham, Lancashire, England
- Died: 16 March 2007 (aged 88); Gold Coast, Queensland, Australia
- Occupations: Actor; compere; musician; lyricist; composer; comedian
- Years active: c. 1942-1990, 2001.
- Spouse: Christina de Grey (d. 2016)

Clifford Frank Degrey (20 May 1918 – 16 March 2007), professionally known as Slim DeGrey and also credited as Slim De Grey and Slim de Gray. was an English-born Australian actor, compere, musician, lyricist, composer and comedian.

== Biography ==
DeGrey who was born in Lancashire, England came to Australia aged six, he served in the Australian Army during World War II, seeing action in the Malayan campaign with the 2/10th Field Ambulance, part of the 8th Division of the Second Australian Imperial Force. He became a POW at the fall of Singapore on 15 February 1942 and was imprisoned in Changi Prison until the end of the war. While at Changi he composed, presented and produced shows.

Degrey appeared in film roles including Newsfront (1978) and Crocodile Dundee in Los Angeles (2001) and appeared in the miniseries Changi, coincidently enough the only survivor who was imprisoned at Changi.

His television roles included Young Ramsay, Bellamy and Skippy the Bush Kangaroo.

== Personal life ==
He was married to Christina de Grey (c.1926/1927-2016) and they had two sons: Calvin, an actor (1957-2008); and Darrell. He was inducted into the Hall of Fame of the Mo Awards.

== Filmography ==
=== Film ===
Title	Year	Role	Type
1966	They're a Weird Mob	Pat	Feature film
1969	You Can't See 'round Corners	Mick Patterson	TV film
1969	Age of Consent	Cooley	Feature film
1971	Demonstrator	Alexander Gurney	Feature film
1971	Wake in Fright	Jarvis	Feature film
1974	Stone	Hannigan	Feature film
1978	Newsfront	Fay's Father	Feature film
1979	The Journalist	Chief Interviewer	Feature film
1982	The Highest Honor	Leading Stoker J.P. McDowell	TV movie
1983	Undercover	Dignitary	Feature film
1983	Molly	Tommy	Feature film
1986	I Own the Racecourse	Waiter #2	TV movie
1989	Kokoda Crescent	Aub	Film
1989	The Saint: Fear in Fun Park	RSL Man	TV movie
1990	Dead Sleep	Mr. McCarthy	Feature film
2001	Crocodile Dundee in Los Angeles	Minister	Feature film

=== Television ===
Title	Year	Role	Type
1967	Love and War		TV miniseries: Intersection
1967	Contrabandits	Wilson	TV series
1967	You Can't See Round Corners	Mick Patterson	TV series
1969	Riptide	Carl	TV series, 7 episodes
1968-69	Skippy the Bush Kangaroo	Charlie / Skeen	TV series
1970	The Rovers	Terry Claffey	TV series
1969-70	Woobinda (Animal Doctor)	Jack Johnson	TV series
1970	The Games	Hunt Driver	Feature film
1969-71	Homicide	Constable Harry Johnson / Joe Pitt / Percy Thompson	TV series
1971	Dead Men Running		TV miniseries
1972	Division 4	Miles Duncan	TV series
1972	Boney	Walsh	TV series
1972	The Spoiler	Detective Sergeant Eric Evans	TV series
1973	Our Man in the Company	Farmer	TV series
1974	Silent Number	Kevin Donaldson	TV series
1971-75	Matlock Police	Alfred Jones / Clem Davis / Dave Shaw	TV series
1979	Chopper Squad	Jack Pearce	TV series
1980	Young Ramsay	Reg Coxton	TV series
1981	Bellamy	Sam	TV miniseries
1983	Silent Reach	Max Burnie	TV miniseries
1983	Scales of Justice	Paul Stewman	TV miniseries
1983, 1984	A Country Practice	Mr. Owens / Dixie Walker	TV series
1985	Shout! The Story of Johnny O'Keefe	Taxi Driver	TV miniseries
1988	The Dirtwater Dynasty	Babcock	TV miniseries
2001	Changi	Older "John" Curly" Foster	TV miniseries

== Awards ==
=== Mo Awards ===
The Australian Entertainment Mo Awards (commonly known informally as the Mo Awards), were annual Australian entertainment industry awards, that recognised achievements in live entertainment in Australia from 1975 to 2016. Slim DeGrey won four awards in that time.

Year	Nominee / work	Award	Result (wins only)
1975	Slim De Grey	Comedian of the Year	Won
1976	Slim De Grey	Comedian of the Year	Won
1978	Slim De Grey	Comedian of the Year	Won
2006	Slim De Grey	Hall of Fame	inducted
