= Dark Summer =

Book by Jon Cleary

- First UK edition
- Author: Jon Cleary
- Language: English
- Series: Scobie Malone
- Genre: Detective
- Publisher: HarperCollins (UK); William Morrow (US)
- Publication date: 1992
- Publication place: Australia
- Preceded by: Pride's Harvest
- Followed by: Bleak Spring

Dark Summer is a 1992 novel from Australian author Jon Cleary.

It was the ninth book featuring Sydney homicide detective Scobie Malone, and begins with the discovery of a corpse in Scobie's swimming pool. The dead man was an informer involved in Scobie's recent drug investigation. Scobie puts his family under police protection and tracks down the killer.

Like many of Cleary's novels it features sport, in this case one day cricket.
