= Bear Pit (novel) =

Novel by Jon Cleary

- First UK edition
- Author: Jon Cleary
- Language: English
- Series: Scobie Malone
- Genre: Detective
- Publisher: HarperCollins (UK); William Morrow (US
- Publication date: 2000
- Publication place: Australia
- Preceded by: Dilemma
- Followed by: Yesterday's Shadow

Bear Pit is a 2000 novel from Australian author Jon Cleary. It was the seventeenth book featuring Sydney detective Scobie Malone and involves the assassination of the State Premier by a sniper in the lead up to the 2000 Sydney Olympics.

Cleary says he was inspired to write the book by the Australian political scene. "I can't remember people being as disillusioned with politics in Australia as they are now," he said in 2000.
