= Babylon South =

Book by Jon Cleary

- First US edition
- Author: Jon Cleary
- Language: English
- Series: Scobie Malone
- Genre: Detective
- Publisher: Collins (UK); William Morrow (US)
- Publication date: 1989
- Publication place: Australia
- Preceded by: Now and Then, Amen
- Followed by: Murder Song

Babylon South is a 1989 novel from Australian author Jon Cleary.

It was the sixth book featuring Sydney homicide detective Scobie Malone, and deals with Malone coming across an old case of his - the 1966 disappearance of the head of ASIO. He also has to investigate another murder, and deal with pressure from the police commissioner.
