= The Beaufort Sisters =

Book by Jon Cleary

- First UK edition
- Author: Jon Cleary
- Language: English
- Publisher: Collins (UK); William Morrow (US)
- Publication date: 1979
- Publication place: Australia

The Beaufort Sisters is a 1979 novel written by Australian author Jon Cleary about four wealthy sisters from Kansas. Kerry Packer wanted to have it adapted into a mini series but although scripts were written no show resulted.
