= The Faraway Drums =

Book by Jon Cleary

- First edition (UK)
- Author: Jon Cleary
- Language: English
- Publisher: Collins (UK); William Morrow (US)
- Publication date: 1981 (UK), 1982 (US)
- Publication place: Australia

The Faraway Drums is a 1981 novel written by Australian author Jon Cleary about an American journalist and British intelligence officer who try to stop the assassination of King George V at the 1911 Delhi Durbar. Film rights were sold but abandoned after it was realised how much an adaptation would cost.
