= Morning's Gone =

Book by Jon Cleary

- First edition
- Author: Jon Cleary
- Language: English
- Publisher: HarperCollins
- Publication date: 2006
- Publication place: Australia

Morning's Gone is a 2006 novel from Australian author Jon Cleary about Matt Durban, an Australian Labor Party politician who is challenging for his party's leadership.

Cleary originally wanted to write a purely political novel but then developed the character of Carmel, Duban's wife, during the writing of it. The book evolved to become more about the story of their marriage.
