= Degrees of Connection =

Book by Jon Cleary

- First edition
- Author: Jon Cleary
- Language: English
- Series: Scobie Malone
- Publisher: HarperCollins
- Publication date: 2003
- Publication place: Australia
- Media type: Print Paperback
- Pages: 276 pp
- ISBN: 0-7322-7632-2
- OCLC: 223765101
- Preceded by: The Easy Sin

Degrees of Connection is a 2004 Ned Kelly Award-winning novel by the Australian author Jon Cleary.

It was the 20th and last entry in the Scobie Malone series. Cleary decided to stop writing crime novels because he felt he was getting stale.

== Synopsis ==
Scobie Malone has been promoted from inspector to superintendent, while Russ Clements is now head of Homicide. He investigates the murder of the personal assistant to Natalie Shipwood, the CEO of development company Orlando. Malone's son, Tom, seems to have impregnated a girlfriend who is subsequently murdered and his daughter Maureen is an ABC journalist covering the Securities Commission investigation into Orlando.

== Awards ==
- Ned Kelly Awards for Crime Writing, Best Novel, 2004: winner

== See also ==
- 2003 in Australian literature

== Notes ==
- Dedication: "For Joy (1922–2003)".
