= Pride's Harvest =

Book by Jon Cleary

- First UK edition
- Author: Jon Cleary
- Language: English
- Series: Scobie Malone
- Genre: Detective
- Publisher: HarperCollins (UK); William Morrow (US)
- Publication date: 1991
- Publication place: Australia
- Preceded by: Murder Song
- Followed by: Dark Summer

Pride's Harvest is a 1991 novel from Australian author Jon Cleary. It was the eighth book featuring Sydney homicide detective Scobie Malone.

== Synopsis ==
Malone is called in to investigate the murder of a Japanese industrialist in the small country town of Collamundra, where his family are holidaying with friends. Scobie becomes involved in local racial tensions and a murder that happened seventeen years ago.
