= Just Let Me Be =

Book by Jon Cleary

- First edition
- Author: Jon Cleary
- Language: English
- Genre: Crime fiction
- Publisher: Wener Laurie
- Publication date: 1950
- Publication place: Australia
- Media type: Print

Just Let Me Be is a 1950 novel from Australian author Jon Cleary. It was his third published full-length novel.

== Premise ==
Joe Brennan, an ex-serviceman, returns home to Coogee after World War II. He gets a job as a milkman and intends to make enough money to marry his girlfriend Connie.

He accidentally kills a man while defending local gangster Bill Pepper and is persuaded to hide the body.

== Reception ==
The Sydney Morning Herald wrote "The details are exact. The dialogue, slangy but not self-conscious, is convincing. On the other hand there are a number of characters who never emerge as more than routine and conventional figures."

=== Awards ===
The novel won the 1950 Australian Literature Society Gold Medal.

== Republication ==
The novel was later republished in 1990 under the title You, the Jury.

== Knife in the Family 1957 TV Version ==
The novel was adapted for British TV in 1957 under the title Knife in the Family.

It was the first acting job in England for Australian actor Rodney Howe who arrived in England seven months previously.

The Liverpool Echo said "there was nothing to hold the interest of even the most tolerant viewer."
