= Dilemma (novel) =

Novel by Jon Cleary

- First UK edition
- Author: Jon Cleary
- Language: English
- Series: Scobie Malone
- Genre: Detective
- Publisher: HarperCollins (UK); William Morrow (US)
- Publication date: 1999
- Publication place: Australia
- Preceded by: Five Ring Circus
- Followed by: Bear Pit

Dilemma is a 1999 novel from Australian author Jon Cleary.

It is the sixteenth book featuring Sydney detective Scobie Malone.

== Synopsis ==
Malone is called in to investigate a murder but the main suspect disappears and isn't arrested until four years later. At the trial he is being prosecuted by one of Malone's old friends who is implicated in the original murder when new evidence comes to light.

== Reviews ==
- Peter Pierce in the Australian Book Review noted: "Dilemma is sprinkled with curious descriptions of the 'she wilted in her body stocking' brand; striking similes – 'a depression as dark as a pocket' – and whimsy: 'some day soon the nation would be a republic'...Cleary's promise of more Malone to come is emphatic: 'Homicide and Serial Offenders go on: murder never stops'. And nor yet, we can be glad to say, has this old trouper."

== See also ==
- 1999 in Australian literature
