= Remember Jack Hoxie =

Book by Jon Cleary

- First UK edition
- Author: Jon Cleary
- Language: English
- Publisher: Collins (UK); William Morrow (US)
- Publication date: 1969
- Publication place: Australia

Remember Jack Hoxie is a 1969 novel written by Australian author Jon Cleary. It was a deliberate departure from the author after writing a series of adventure novels, being set in the world of pop music.

== Plot ==
An insurance adjuster accompanies his teenage pop idol son on tour.

== Background ==
Cleary was inspired to write the novel after seeing an Australian pop star leaving Mascot airport for London:

He was surrounded by hundreds of squealing fans, reporters, photographers, and TV cameras. The TV kept zooming on to the faces of his parents, who stood a little away, looking totally bewildered by the whole thing. This intrigued me. How did ordinary parents feel when their son was caught up in a world far beyond their understanding?"

Later in London Cleary travelled with a pop group for six weeks to do additional research. "I ended up with haemorrhoids of the eardrums. But, believe me, I found another world."

Cleary originally intended to use the title for another novel, a story set in the Middle East, but that became Season of Doubt.

== Reception ==
The critic from the New York Times said "it is evident that the pop music scene is not an element in which Mr Cleary is very comfortable. His narrative skills are squandered on a frail recipe that lacks his customary involvement."

Film rights were bought by the son of Walter Mirisch but no movie resulted.
