= The City of Fading Light =

Book by Jon Cleary

- First UK edition
- Author: Jon Cleary
- Language: English
- Publisher: Collins (UK); William Morrow (US)
- Publication date: 1985
- Publication place: Australia

The City of Fading Light is a 1985 novel written by Australian author Jon Cleary about a Hollywood actress who tries to rescue her Jewish mother from 1939 Berlin. The book features Sean Carmody, the character from his earlier novel The Sundowners.

Cleary researched the novel on a trip to Berlin with his family and based the plot on a real British plan to assassinate Hitler prior to the war.
