= Winter Chill =

Book by Jon Cleary

- First UK edition
- Author: Jon Cleary
- Language: English
- Series: Scobie Malone
- Genre: Detective
- Publisher: HarperCollins (UK); William Morrow (US)
- Publication date: 1995
- Publication place: Australia
- Preceded by: Autumn Maze
- Followed by: Endpeace

Winter Chill is a 1995 novel from Australian author Jon Cleary. It was the twelfth book featuring Sydney detective Scobie Malone and centers on the death of an American lawyer at a convention – and the murder of the security guard who found him.
