= Yesterday's Shadow =

2001 novel by Jon Cleary

- First edition
- Author: Jon Cleary
- Language: English
- Series: Scobie Malone
- Genre: Detective
- Publisher: HarperCollins (Australia/UK); William Morrow (US)
- Publication date: 2001
- Publication place: Australia
- Preceded by: Bear Pit
- Followed by: The Easy Sin

Yesterday's Shadow is a 2001 novel from Australian author Jon Cleary, his 50th over all. It was the eighteenth book featuring Sydney detective Scobie Malone.

== Synopsis ==
The plot involves two murders which take place at the same hotel on the same night, one of the victims being the wife of the American ambassador. The other is a cleaner who happens to be a former girfriend of Malone's.

== Critical reception ==
In The Canberra Times Jeff Popple noted that unlike "most modern crime novels there is not a profusion of blood and violence, instead Cleary relies on old-fashioned story-telling, engaging characters and plenty of wry observations on Australian society to keep his readers entertained. As always, it is very enjoyable journey down Sydney's not-so-mean streets."

Peter Pierce, in The Sydney Morning Herald, found Malone to be "kindly treated" by the author and commented that "Cleary is no Peter Corris in terms of the evocation of place, nor as hard-boiled as the next generation of Australian crime writers, but there is a commendable workmanship in his exposition of how cases are solved or misunderstood. Scobie is a stern monitor of the loosely expressed opinions of his junior officers."
