= The Sundowners (1960 film) =

1960 film by Fred Zinnemann

- Film poster
- Directed by: Fred Zinnemann
- Screenplay by: Isobel Lennart
- Based on: The Sundowners; 1952 novel by Jon Cleary
- Produced by: Gerry Blattner; Fred Zinnemann
- Starring: Deborah Kerr; Robert Mitchum; Peter Ustinov
- Cinematography: Jack Hildyard
- Edited by: Jack Harris
- Music by: Dimitri Tiomkin
- Color process: Technicolor
- Distributed by: Warner Bros. Pictures
- Release date: 9 December 1960 (US)
- Running time: 133 minutes
- Countries: United States; United Kingdom; Australia
- Language: English
- Box office: $3.8 million

The Sundowners is a 1960 drama Western film film that tells the story of a 1920s Australian outback family torn between the father's desires to continue his nomadic sheep-herding ways and the wife and son's desire to settle in one place. The Sundowners was produced and directed by Fred Zinnemann, adapted by Isobel Lennart from Jon Cleary's 1952 novel of the same name, with Deborah Kerr, Robert Mitchum, and Peter Ustinov, Glynis Johns, Mervyn Johns, Dina Merrill, Michael Anderson Jr., and Chips Rafferty.

In 2019, FilmInk cited it among "50 meat pie Westerns".

At the 33rd Academy Awards, it was in the running for Best Picture, and Kerr was nominated for Best Actress in a Leading Role, Johns for Best Actress in a Supporting Role, Zinnemann for Best Director, and Lennart for Best Writing, Screenplay Based on Material from Another Medium, with no Academy wins.

== Plot ==
Irish-Australian Paddy Carmody is a sheep drover and shearer, roving the sparsely populated outback with his wife, Ida, and son, Sean. They are sundowners, constantly moving, pitching their tent whenever the sun goes down. Ida and Sean want to settle, but Paddy's wanderlust never allows them to stay in one place for long. While passing through the bush, the family meet refined Englishman Rupert Venneker. Paddy hires him to help drive a large herd of sheep to Cawndilla. Along the way, they survive a dangerous bushfire.

Mrs. Firth, who runs the pub in Cawndilla, takes a liking to Rupert. He spends nights with her, but, like Paddy, he has no desire to be tied down.

Ida convinces Paddy to take a job at a station shearing sheep; she works as the cook, Rupert as a wool roller, and Sean is a tar boy. Ida enjoys the company of Jean Halstead, their employer's young stylish but lonely wife. When fellow shearer Bluey Brown's pregnant wife Liz arrives unannounced, she assists the young woman through her first birth.

Ida is secretly saving the money the family earns for a down payment on a farm that is for sale that they camped on during the sheep drive. Although Paddy has agreed to participate in a shearing contest against someone from a rival group, he decides to leave six weeks into the shearing season. Ida persuades him to stay. He loses the contest to an old veteran.

Paddy wins a lot of money and a racehorse playing two-up. Owning such an animal has been his longstanding dream. They name him Sundowner and enter him, with Sean as his jockey, at local races on their travels after the shearing is done. Sean and Sundowner win their first race.

Ida finally convinces a still-reluctant Paddy to buy the farm that she and Sean want, but he loses all the money Ida had saved in a single night of playing two-up. To make amends, he says there is a buyer for Sundowner if he wins the next race. The money would recoup their down payment. Although Sundowner wins, he is disqualified for interference, and the deal falls through. Nevertheless, Paddy's deep remorse heals the breach with Ida, and they resolve to save enough to one day buy a farm.

== Cast ==
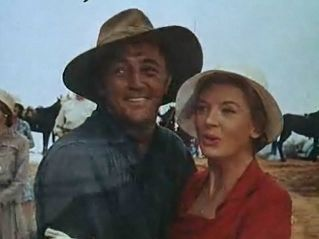
Robert Mitchum and Deborah Kerr

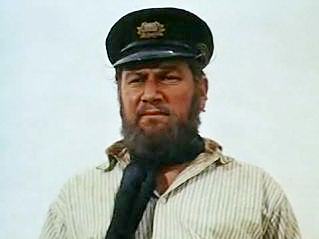
Peter Ustinov

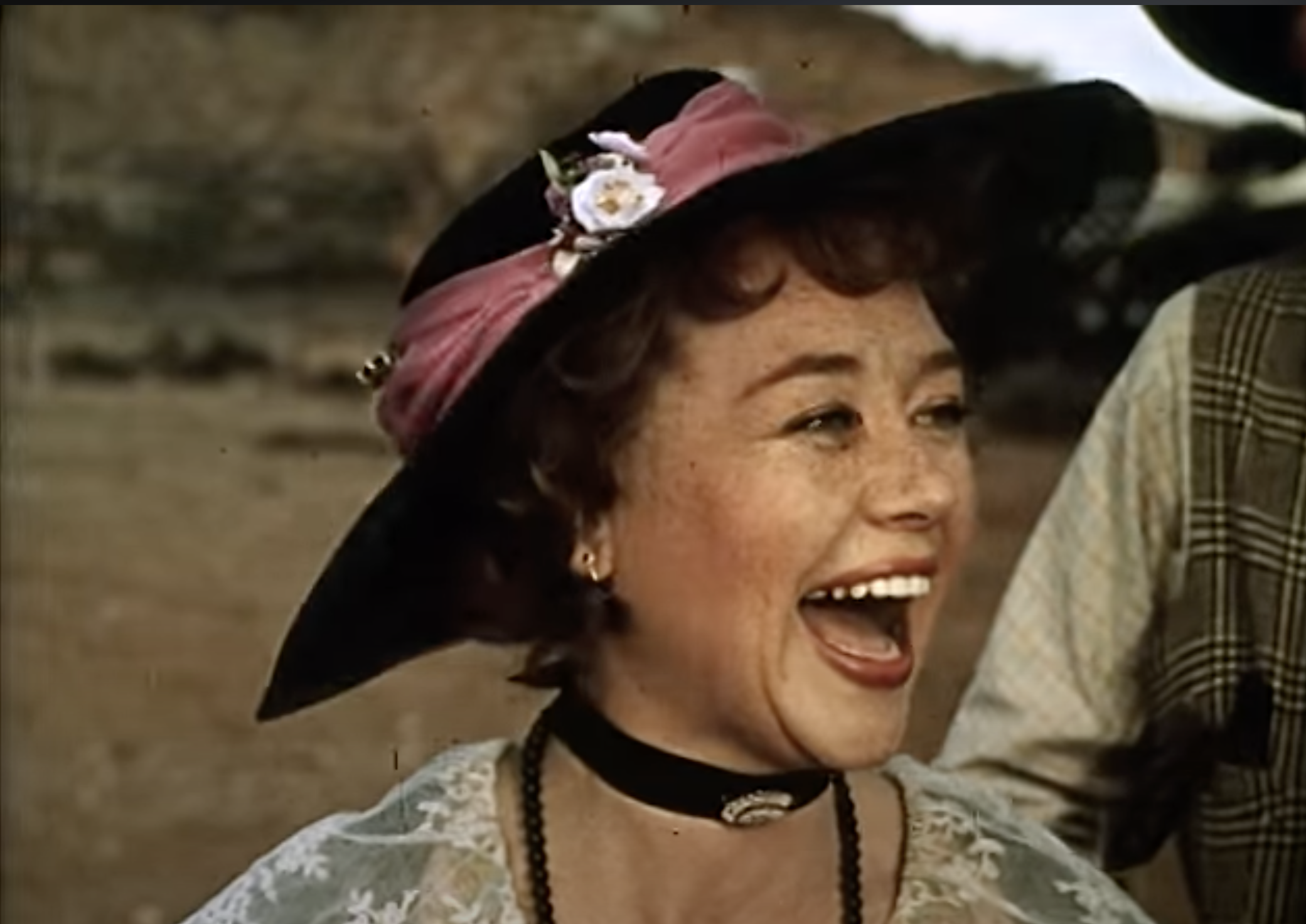
Glynis Johns

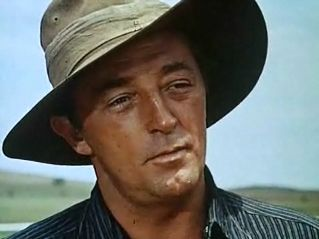
Robert Mitchum

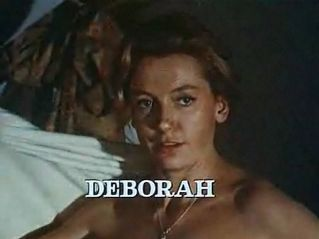
Deborah Kerr

- Deborah Kerr as Ida Carmody
- Robert Mitchum as Paddy Carmody
- Peter Ustinov as Rupert Venneker
- Glynis Johns as Mrs. Firth
- Dina Merrill as Jean Halstead
- Chips Rafferty as Quinlan
- Michael Anderson Jr. as Sean Carmody
- Lola Brooks as Liz Brown
- Wylie Watson as Herb Johnson
- John Meillon as Bluey Brown
- Ronald Fraser as Clint Ocker
- Gerry Duggan
- Leonard Teale
- Peter Carver
- Dick Bentley as Evan Evans
- Mervyn Johns as Jack Patchogue
- Molly Urquhart as Mrs. Bateman
- Ewen Solon as Halstead
- John Fegan as Drover
- Max Osbiston
- Mercia Barden

== Production ==
Fred Zinnemann decided to make the film at the suggestion of Dorothy Hammerstein, the Australian-born, second wife of Oscar Hammerstein II. She intended to send him a copy of the novel The Shiralee (later filmed with Peter Finch), but accidentally sent a copy of The Sundowners. He immediately bought the screen rights and decided to produce it himself. According to Zinnemann's autobiography, Aaron Spelling was signed to write the screenplay, but was replaced by Isobel Lennart; another source states the screenplay was mostly written by Jon Cleary in spite of Lennart's screen credit. The ending of the film was a tribute to John Huston's The Treasure of the Sierra Madre. Gary Cooper was hired to play Paddy Carmody, but had to leave due to poor health. He was replaced by Robert Mitchum, who agreed to work on the film for a chance to appear with Deborah Kerr, with whom he had become good friends while making Heaven Knows, Mr. Allison. He also agreed to give her top billing, joking to the production team that they could "design a 24-foot sign of me bowing to her if you like". Michael Anderson, Jr. was imported from England to play their son.

Zinnemann was determined to film The Sundowners on location and vetoed Jack L. Warner's plan to shoot in Arizona or near Dallas, Texas to save money. Interiors were shot at Associated British Picture Corporation Elstree Studios in England; exteriors were shot in Australia in Carriewerloo, Cooma, Hawker, Iron Knob, Jindabyne, Nimmitabel, Port Augusta, Quorn, and Whyalla. The "for-sale" property in the film was called Hiawatha and was on the Snowy River, just north of Old Jindabyne (now under the waters of Lake Jindabyne).

It was part of a "mini boom" of foreign productions in Australia in the late 1950s. Filming began in 1959. Zinnemann spent 12 weeks filming scenery and sheep droving before the cast arrived in October. The weather made location filming difficult, fluctuating from hot and humid to cold and rainy. This delayed production by several weeks and caused some irritation among the cast and crew. Mitchum was often harassed by fans and eventually moved onto a boat to avoid them. Filming wrapped on 17 December 1959. A number of Australian actors appeared in the supporting cast.

Ray Austin was the stunt coordinator. Nicolas Roeg, who later directed films such as Walkabout, was a second unit camera operator.

== Reception ==
When the movie premiered at the Radio City Music Hall, Bosley Crowther of The New York Times called the film an "especially appropriate entertainment for the Christmas holidays"; according to Crowther:

What is nice about these people and valid about this film, is that they have an abundance of freshness, openness, and vitality. The action scenes are dynamic—the scenes of driving sheep, shearing them, racing horses at a genuine 'bush country' track, and simply living happily in the great sky-covered outdoors. And the scenes of human involvements—those between the husband and the wife, of a woman having a baby, of a footloose housewife looking at a stove—are deeply and poignantly revealing of how good and sensitive people can be.

=== Box office ===
The Sundowners, marketed as a "newer version" of From Here to Eternity, was a financial failure in the United States. The film reached the top 10 at the UK box office and was the third-highest grossing film of 1961 in Australia.

Kinematograph Weekly called it a "money maker" at the British box office in 1961.

== Awards ==
=== 33rd Academy Awards ===
- Nomination for Best Film
- Nomination for Best Performance by an Actress – Deborah Kerr
- Nomination for Best Performance by an Actress in a Supporting Role – Glynis Johns
- Nomination for Best Achievement in Directing – Fred Zinneman
- Nomination for Best Screenplay Based on Material from Another Medium – Isobel Lennart

=== Other awards and honours ===
- New York Film Critics Circle Award for Best Actress – Deborah Kerr
- National Board of Review Award for Best Actor – Robert Mitchum (also for Home from the Hill)
- Named Third Best Film of 1960 by the National Board of Review of Motion Pictures
- Named Fourth Best Film of 1960 by the New York Daily News
- Named one of the Ten Best Films of 1960 by The New York Post, The Saturday Review and the New York World-Telegram

The February 2020 issue of New York Magazine lists The Sundowners as among "The Best Movies That Lost Best Picture at the Oscars."
