= Nobody Runs Forever =

1968 British film by Ralph Thomas

- Original film poster
- Directed by: Ralph Thomas
- Written by: Wilfred Greatorex; Rod Taylor (uncredited)
- Based on: The High Commissioner by Jon Cleary
- Produced by: Betty E. Box
- Starring: Rod Taylor; Christopher Plummer; Lilli Palmer; Daliah Lavi; Camilla Sparv; Burt Kwouk
- Cinematography: Ernest Steward
- Edited by: Ernest Hosler
- Music by: Georges Delerue
- Production companies: The Rank Organisation; Katzka-Berne Productions
- Distributed by: Rank Film Distributors
- Release dates: 22 August 1968 (London-premiere); 30 August 1968 (United Kingdom)
- Running time: 101 minutes
- Country: United Kingdom
- Language: English
- Budget: $1,055,000
- Box office: $605,000

Nobody Runs Forever, also called The High Commissioner, is a 1968 British political neo noir spy thriller action film directed by Ralph Thomas and based on Jon Cleary's 1966 novel The High Commissioner. It stars Rod Taylor as Australian policeman Scobie Malone and Christopher Plummer as the Australian High Commissioner in Britain caught up in corrupt dealings, during delicate negotiations. Taylor's production company was involved in making the film, as was the American company Selmur Productions.

== Plot ==
Sergeant Scobie Malone of the New South Wales Police (NSW Police) is summoned to Sydney by the gruff Premier of New South Wales, Mr Flannery, who asks Malone to travel to London and arrest the senior Australian diplomat in Britain, Sir James Quentin, High Commissioner to the UK. Sir James, a political rival of the Premier, has become the only suspect in a 17-year-old murder case.

Upon his arrival at the Australian High Commission in London, Malone meets Lady Quentin and her husband, as well as Sir James's secretary. Sir James does not object to being arrested, but he asks for a few days to conclude delicate peace negotiations. As Malone waits as a guest of the High Commission, he uncovers a plot to assassinate Sir James, masterminded by the head of a dangerous spy ring, Maria Cholon.

== Cast ==
- Rod Taylor as 'Scobie' Malone
- Christopher Plummer as Sir James Quentin
- Lilli Palmer as Lady Sheila Quentin
- Camilla Sparv as Lisa Pretorius
- Daliah Lavi as Maria Cholon
- Clive Revill as Joseph
- Lee Montague as Denzil
- Calvin Lockhart as 'Jamaica'
- Derren Nesbitt as Pallain
- Edric Connor as Julius
- Paul Grist as Coburn
- Burt Kwouk as Pham Chinh
- Russell Napier as Leeds
- Ken Wayne as Ferguson
- Charles "Bud" Tingwell as Jacko (as Charles Tingwell)
- Franchot Tone as Ambassador Townsend
- Leo McKern as Flannery (uncredited)
- Peter Reynolds as Casino Manager (uncredited)
- Tony Selby as cameraman (uncredited)
- Nick Tate as Sir James's Assistant (uncredited)
- Vincent Ball as Australian Policeman (uncredited)
- Gerald Sim as Airport Official (uncredited)

== Production ==
In August 1966 Cleary said Frank Sinatra was interested in buying the film rights. Film rights were sold in December 1966. Finance came from the Rank Organisation and America's ABC network.

Filmed in London, this was the last big-screen appearance of Franchot Tone, who plays the American ambassador. Rod Taylor has a rare opportunity to play an Australian, even though it was his native land. Taylor's unsophisticated integrity is contrasted with the London diplomatic scene throughout the film.

Taylor accepted the role on the proviso he could rewrite some of the script. In particular, the opening scene where Scobie Malone arrests Jacko (Charles Tingwell) is Rod's work.

Ralph Thomas later said "I was a hired hand" on the film; "It was ok".

=== Differences from novel ===
There were several key changes from the novel, including: introducing Scobie Malone as an outback policeman, reducing the emphasis on the peace conference being for the Vietnam War and making it something more vague, Scobie having sex with Maria Cholon.

== Reception ==
=== Critical ===
The Monthly Film Bulletin wrote: "Despite a basically promising situation, a distinguished cast and plenty of gloss, this thriller is a catastrophic failure on any level. The actors are scarcely able to conceal their embarrassment with the impossible dialogue they are given, Daliah Lavi and Camilla Sparv are wasted, and even Clive Revill is hard put to raise a couple of laughs from his snobbish reactions to an Australian from the outback. The script rambles along without rhyme or reason, and the most obvious opportunities for suspense (like the attempted assassination on the Centre Court at Wimbledon) are badly mishandled. The film has something of the flavour of a middle-period Hitchcock, but not a trace of the Master's talent."

Filmink called it "a poor adaptation of a fine book, the tail end of Rank’s mid-‘60s Eurospy cycle."

Variety gave it a positive review: "A melodrama with political undertones which has tension and intrigue yet doesn’t lose sight of its main purpose, to examine the relationship of two decent men in a rough situation. Storyline, based on Jon Cleary’s novel The High Commissioner, is workmanlike... dialog is crisp and persuasive and most of the lead players are believable.

=== Box office ===
The film earned rentals of $455,000 in North America and $150,000 elsewhere. It recorded a loss of $1,185,000.

It recorded admissions in France of 44,083.

== See also ==
- List of British films of 1968
