= The Green Helmet =

1961 British film by Michael Forlong

- Directed by: Michael Forlong
- Written by: Jon Cleary
- Based on: The Green Helmet; 1957 novel by Jon Cleary
- Produced by: Charles F. Vetter
- Starring: Bill Travers; Ed Begley; Sid James
- Cinematography: Geoffrey Faithfull
- Edited by: Frank Clarke
- Music by: Ken Jones
- Production company: Metro-Goldwyn-Mayer
- Distributed by: Metro-Goldwyn-Mayer
- Release date: 1961
- Running time: 88 minutes
- Country: United Kingdom
- Language: English
- Budget: $378,000
- Box office: $950,000

The Green Helmet is a 1961 British drama film directed by Michael Forlong starring Bill Travers, Ed Begley and Sid James. The film is centred on a British motor racing team. It is based on the 1957 novel of the same title by Australian author Jon Cleary.

== Plot outline ==
At France's 24-hour Le Mans race when British champion racing driver Greg Rafferty crashes his car. The plot then follows Rafferty as he continues to race while also concealing his fears.

== Cast ==
- Bill Travers as Rafferty
- Ed Begley as Bartell
- Sid James as Richie Launder
- Nancy Walters as Diane
- Ursula Jeans as Mrs. Rafferty
- Megs Jenkins as Kitty Launder
- Jack Brabham as Himself
- Sean Kelly as Taz Rafferty
- Tutte Lemkow as Carlo Zaraga
- Gordon Tanner as Hastrow
- Ferdy Mayne as Rossano
- Peter Collingwood as Charlie
- Roland Curram as George
- Diane Clare as Pamela
- Harold Kasket as Lupi

== Production ==
Film rights were bought by MGM, who hired Cleary to adapt his own novel. He said, "They bought it on the strength that some American producer who was an alcoholic which they didn't know he'd read the book... This producer said he had something between 20 and 25000 feet of the most spectacular motor racing. And he ran about a thousand feet of it and it was spectacular. What they didn't know was the other 24,000 was just nothing."

The head of MGM's British operation was Lawrence Bachmann, and it was one of the first films made under his auspices.

The director was Michael Forlong, a New Zealander from television. This was his first film. "I want this to be an adult film about a sport I love very much," said Forlong. "I want to show why drivers race, why they are frightened, why they can't give it up."

The star was Bill Travers who Cleary said "was a charming likeable bloke but he was miscast" and who asked the author not to write "any long speeches because I can't handle them."

Travers was six feet four which meant they had to design a car around him. The technical adviser was Stirling Moss. Ed Begley was imported from America. Cleary said Walters was a beauty queen who had been signed to MGM "and she was charming and friendly and everybody liked her, she was an absolute dish to look at...and she couldn't change expression." South African Sid James was cast as an Australian although Cleary says he spoke in "an Afrikaaner accent. They put him in because he looked right for the part and he was always good at working class characters."

Although most of the movie was set in Italy, it was shot in Wales. It was completed by January 1961.

== Reception ==
=== Critical ===
The Monthly Film Bulletin wrote: "This is the Formula One plot for motor racing films – fraternal rivalry, the trying out of an unknown designer's car, loss of nerve, fatal crashes, big race triumph. Direction and script do little more than put it on the screen, though in a sufficiently business-like and unpretentious way. It is the driving scenes at Le Mans, Sebring and in the Mille Miglia, however, which really matter; and they are handled with a professionalism suggesting a sharper eye for cars than for people. The most effective – indeed unfailingly effective – moments are those in which the camera is simply mounted on the car, giving a driver's view of the Silverstone track taken at speed."

The New York Times called it "a noisy diatribe against speed car racing" in which Travers "looks unhappy" and Begley "delivers every cliche in the script with embarrassing enthusiasm."

Variety called it a "pack of autoracing melodramatic cliches helped by fast action sequences."

=== Box office ===
Cleary disliked the final film and said "They got their money back on it but only just." According to MGM records the film earned $375,000 in the US and $575,000 internationally, making a profit of $124,000. In May 1962 Bachmann reported the film was in the black.
