= Autumn Maze =

Book by Jon Cleary

Bleak Spring
- First UK edition
- Author: Jon Cleary
- Language: English
- Series: Scobie Malone
- Genre: Detective
- Publisher: HarperCollins (UK); William Morrow (US)
- Publication date: 1994
- Publication place: Australia
- Preceded by: Bleak Spring
- Followed by: Winter Chill

Autumn Maze is a 1994 novel from Australian author Jon Cleary. It was the eleventh book featuring Sydney detective Scobie Malone and centers on the murder of the police minister's son.
