= Murder Song =

1990 book by Jon Cleary

- First UK edition
- Author: Jon Cleary
- Language: English
- Series: Scobie Malone
- Genre: Detective
- Publisher: Collins (UK); William Morrow (US)
- Publication date: 1990
- Publication place: Australia
- Preceded by: Babylon South
- Followed by: Pride's Harvest

Murder Song is a 1990 novel from Australian author Jon Cleary. It was the seventh book featuring Sydney homicide detective Scobie Malone.

Cleary originally wanted to title the book Six Green Bottles but was talked out of it by his publisher.

== Synopsis ==
A young woman is killed by a sniper in a Sydney apartment building. Malone discovers the building was owned by a businessman with links to organised crime – who was a cadet with Malone years ago at the police academy. Soon another former classmate of theirs is also killed.
