= The Golden Sabre =

Book by Jon Cleary

- First UK edition
- Author: Jon Cleary
- Language: English
- Publisher: Collins (UK); William Morrow (US)
- Publication date: 1981
- Publication place: Australia

The Golden Sabre is a 1981 novel written by Australian author Jon Cleary.

During the Russian Revolution of 1917, an American mining engineer and English governess flee across country.
