= Peter's Pence (novel) =

1974 novel by Jon Cleary

- First US edition
- Author: Jon Cleary
- Language: English
- Publisher: Collins (UK); William Morrow (US)
- Publication date: 1974
- Publication place: Australia

Peter's Pence is a 1974 novel by the Australian author Jon Cleary.

== Synopsis ==
The novel is about an IRA plot to steal treasure from the Vatican with the help of an Irish-American journalist. They kidnap the Pope instead.

The book won the Best Novel Award at the 1975 Edgar Awards.
