= Lyndall Barbour =

Australian actress (1916–1986)

Lyndall Harvey Barbour
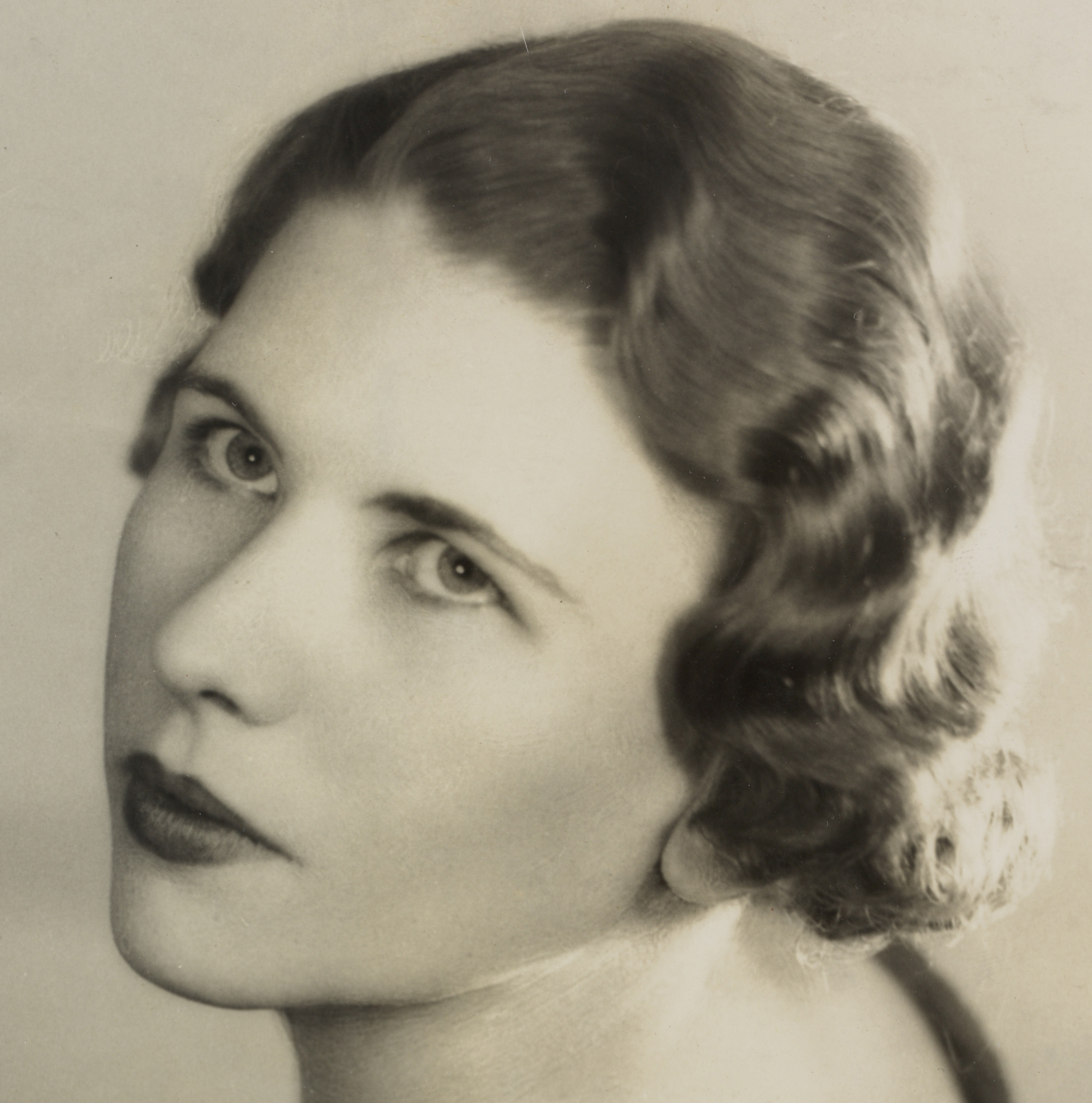
- Lyndall Barbour, Australia, c. 1937
- Born: 19 May 1916; Cairo, Egypt
- Died: 10 October 1986 (aged 70); Wahroonga, New South Wales, Australia
- Education: University of Sydney
- Occupations: Actress (radio, stage and TV)
- Awards: Macquarie Network award x3

Lyndall Harvey Barbour (19 May 1916 – 10 October 1986) was an Australian actress, primarily of radio, although she also added stage and television work (both series and made-for-television movies) to her repertoire. Born in Egypt to Australian parents, she was a three time recipient of the Macquarie Radio Network award.

== Early life ==
Lyndall Harvey Barbour was born in Cairo, the daughter of Australian parents Eric Pitty Barbour and Dora Frances Blanche Barbour (Grieve). Both of her parents were born in New South Wales. Her father was serving in the Royal Australian Army Medical Corps during World War I at the time of her birth. She was raised in Sydney, attending the Church of England Girls Grammar School, before earning a bachelor's degree at the University of Sydney in 1938, and joined the dramatic society under the engagement of May Hollinworth.

== Career ==
Barbour began acting while in college, and whilst attending auditions in 1937, she was scouted by Edward Howell and studied drama with his wife Therese Desmond. She soon found a niche as a radio actress for the Australian Broadcasting Commission, and later 2GB. Casting director Val Vine commented that "Lyndall Barbour was so technically correct, she never missed a comma." She was heard in over three hundred radio plays and serials, including Malcolm Afford's World War II drama First Light Fraser. She won Macquarie Awards as best supporting actress in 1946 and 1948, and as best actress in 1949, for Genius at Home. From 1954 to 1970 she starred in the Australian version of the soap opera Portia Faces Life as Portia Manning, a successful lawyer.

She played some notable roles in early Australian television drama, including the title role in Ruth.

She appeared in the television series You Can't See 'Round Corners in 1967 and the film version in 1969.

Later in life Barbour recorded audiobooks for the Royal Blind Society of New South Wales. She also appeared in stage and television roles, the latter particularly in the 1960s after radio work became scarce. She won a best actress award from the Sydney Theatre Critics' Circle in 1956 for her work in The Rose Tattoo. Her last film appearance was in 1981, in Maybe This Time, starring Judy Morris.

== Personal life ==
Barbour died at Wahroonga, New South Wales in 1986, aged 70.

== Filmography ==
Year	Title	Role	Notes
1954-1970	Portia Faces Life	Portia Manning	Australian version of American soap opera
1959	Ruth	Ruth	TV play
1959	Sunday Night Theatre	Nell Brandon	TV series
1959	The Flying Doctor	Alma Curtis	TV series
1960	The Grey Nurse Said Nothing	unknown	
1961	A Little South of Heaven	Mama Chipetta	TV movie
1961	The Outcasts	unknown	TV miniseries
1963	A Dead Secret	unknown	TV movie
1963	Time Out	Lola Montez/Mary Bryant	TV series
1966	Homicide	Margaret Simmons	TV series
1966	Australian Playhouse	Mrs. Fletcher	TV series
1967	You Can't See 'Round Corners	Mrs. McCoy	TV series
1969	You Can't See 'round Corners	Mrs. McCoy	Film
1970	The Link Men	Mrs. Amarato	TV series
1970	Delta	Marta	TV series
1971	Matlock Police	Mama Marcelli	TV series
1972	Lane End	unknown (7 episodes)	TV miniseries
1979	Dawn!	Edie	Film
1980	Maybe This Time	Mrs. Bates	Film
1981	Lay Me Down in Lilac Fields	unknown	
