= Spearfield's Daughter =

Book by Jon Cleary

- First Australian edition
- Author: Jon Cleary
- Language: English
- Publisher: Collins (Australia/UK); William Morrow (US)
- Publication date: 1982
- Publication place: Australia

Spearfield's Daughter is a 1982 novel written by Australian author Jon Cleary.

== Adaptation ==
The book was adapted into a 1986 Australian-Canadian mini series, Spearfield's Daughter, starring Christopher Plummer and Kim Braden. Cleary's original scripts were rewritten and he describes the result as a "disaster".
