= The Phoenix Tree (novel) =

Novel by Jon Cleary

- First edition
- Author: Jon Cleary
- Language: English
- Publisher: Collins
- Publication date: 1984
- Publication place: Australia

The Phoenix Tree is a 1984 novel from Australian author Jon Cleary set in Japan during the last days of World War II.

Cleary said he was drawn to the opportunity to do something different and to write from a Japanese mindset.

The novel is set at the end of World War II. It deals with the bombing of Tokyo and the devastation of Hiroshima and Nagasaki, and revolves around the themes of war and peace.
