= The Safe House (1975 novel) =

Book by Jon Cleary

- First US edition
- Author: Jon Cleary
- Language: English
- Publisher: Collins (UK); William Morrow (US)
- Publication date: 1975
- Publication place: Australia

The Safe House is a 1975 novel written by Australian author Jon Cleary about the fate of Jews and Nazis after World War II.

Cleary did a huge amount of research for the novel involving extensive travel.
