= Forests of the Night (Cleary novel) =

Book by Jon Cleary

- First US edition
- Author: Jon Cleary
- Language: English
- Publisher: Collins (UK); William Morrow (US)
- Publication date: 1963
- Publication place: Australia

Forests of the Night is a 1963 novel from Australian author Jon Cleary.

== Synopsis ==
The novel follows a British plastic surgeon who visits his father in Burma and gets involved with a Catholic missionary, a killer tiger and a local rebel leader.

Cleary visited Burma as part of his research.

== Critical reception ==
A reviewer in The Sydney Morning Herald found the novel a bit contrived: "The northern Kachin and Shan States of Burma are the background for this competent (almost to the point of being slick) and fairly entertaining novel. It contains some of the usual ingredients for a successful story set in the East: beautiful Eurasian girl of mysterious parentage, tiger hunts, clashes with terrorists, faithful Gunga Din...The story unfolds with the ease of a practised pen, although there is more than a tinge of contrivance in pulling the thresda together."

== Film adaptation ==
At one stage there were plans to make a film version with Dirk Bogarde but this did not eventuate.

== Radio adaptation ==
The novel was adapted for Australian radio by Richard Lane. It was one of the last significant commercial Australian radio plays.

== See also ==
- Forests of the Night at AustLit (subscription required)
- 1963 in Australian literature
