= The Climate of Courage =

Book by Jon Cleary

- First edition
- Author: Jon Cleary
- Language: English
- Publisher: Collins
- Publication date: 1954
- Publication place: Australia

The Climate of Courage is a 1954 novel by Australian writer Jon Cleary. It was his fifth published novel. It is set during World War II and involves a group of Australian soldiers who have returned from service in the Middle East.

== Premise ==
The novel falls into two parts: the soldiers on leave in Sydney, where they engage in various romantic entanglements and experience the famous submarine attack on Sydney, then taking part in a patrol during the New Guinea Campaign.

== Background ==
The book was based on Cleary's experiences in the army during World War Two, where he served in the Middle East and New Guinea. He said it took him ten years to write the book. He admitted that he made some alternations to make the book more appealing to international audiences, as he felt it was more difficult for them to understand Australian culture:

It means, for one thing, using dialogue that is more universal than the parochial slang your characters would naturally use, or, when you do use slang (an an Australian writer has to, because Australians use so much slang in their everyday conversation), you have to make its meaning self evident. Again, an Australian writer haslittle opportunity for satire because the satire would be lost on the reader who didn’t know the background. He has to take chances on his humour (because the Australian sense of humour is more sardonic—you might even say more cruel—than is general elsewhere in the world). And when a writer has pride in his country, as I have, he must see that that pride is expressed in a way that won’t offend the pride of a reader in another country.

== Reception ==
The book was published in Australia just as Cleary returned to Australia after seven and a half years away.

The book was very popular, selling 28,000 copies in the UK during its first week of publication.

Reviews were strong in London.

The Age wrote "Mr. Cleary's qualities, moral ones, are worth noting... They are an egalitarianism which can make a lieutenant openly take sides with the men against a major; a belief in the colored people of Australia and New Guinea; a belief that war is hell and should not occur; a belief in human perfectibility. To depict this tradition without naviety requires great art. Many pages in "The Climate of Courage I suggest that Mr. Cleary can acquire it."

The Argus said "Jon Cleary is a smart enough novelist to set up a handful of sharply outlined characters, and to vary his effects between violence, tragedy and a wry and salty humor. But I do not feel that he has done anything in this novel which has not been done already - and done just as well. Until an Australian can show us the jungle and the Japs in a new light, we might as well admit that we have said just about all there is to say of them."

The Bulletin said "Cleary has his compensations; his gift for the general scene, and the view of life that is more shared than individual, has brought him a wide public; and to this he adds, as in his first novel, You Can’t See Round Corners, an ability to raise moral problems."

The Daily Telegraph said the novel "has the easy assurance that marks the work of a professional writer who has fully mastered the externals of his craft."

The Sydney Morning Herald wrote "in the first part of the novel the atmosphere of wartime Sydney is conveyed well and the soldiers are neatly drawn, but their domestic affairs are made less convincing by a romantic approach that shows itself in sentimental situations and smart, artificial talk. Once the men are together again in New Guinea, Mr. Cleary's best qualities take charge."

== Adaptation ==
The novel was adapted for Australian radio in 1956 with a cast that included John Meillon.
