= You Can't See 'round Corners =

- Directed by: David Cahill
- Written by: Richard Lane
- Based on: novel by Jon Cleary
- Produced by: Peter Summerton
- Starring: Ken Shorter; Rowena Wallace
- Cinematography: Graham Lind
- Edited by: Jacques De Vigne
- Music by: Thomas Tycho
- Production company: Amalgamated Television Services
- Distributed by: Universal Pictures
- Release date: 16 January 1969
- Running time: 98 minutes
- Country: Australia
- Language: English
- Budget: $60,000 or $100,000

You Can't See 'round Corners is a 1969 Australian drama film directed by David Cahill and screenplay written by Richard Lane, starring Ken Shorter and Rowena Wallace. The film is a theatrical version of the 1967 TV show You Can't See 'Round Corners. Both were based on the 1947 novel by Jon Cleary updated to the Vietnam War.

== Synopsis ==
Frankie McCoy, a small time bookie from Newtown, Sydney, is drafted during the Vietnam War. He loves his girlfriend Margie but is frustrated because she won't sleep with him before they are married. He goes through basic training at Kapooka, near Wagga Wagga but eventually deserts. Margie breaks up with him once she finds this out.

Frankie goes back to working as a bookie but suffers a series of losses. In order to cover these he robs an office, not realising the money he has stolen consists of marked bills. He visits a Kings Cross night club, meeting a girl, Myra, who he sleeps with and gives some of the stolen money. Both the military and regular police start to close in on Frankie, and he discovers that the bills were marked. He goes back to Myra to retrieve the money. They get in an argument and he winds up accidentally killing her. He contacts Margie but is chased after by some of the men he owes money to and winds up running in front of a moving car and being killed.

== Cast ==
- Ken Shorter as Frankie McCoy
- Lyndall Barbour as Mrs. McCoy
- Rowena Wallace as Margie Harris
- Judith Fisher as Peg Clancy
- Carmen Duncan as Myra Neilson
- Slim DeGrey as Mick Patterson
- Max Cullen as Peeper
- Kevin Leslie as Ken
- Goff Vockler as Barney
- Lou Vernon as Nugget
- John Armstrong as Jack Kelly
- Peter Aanensen as Sgt Quinn
- Max Phipps as Keith Grayson
- Vincent Gil as Lennie Ryan
- Henri Szeps as Peter
- Marion Johns as Mrs Harris
- John Barnes as Mr Harris
- Gerard Maguire as Terry (uncredited)
- Garry McDonald as one of Terry's gang (uncredited)
- Harold Hopkins as Soldier at dance (uncredited)
- The Atlantics

== Production ==
The film was shot in mid 1967, financed by the Seven Network. It used the same cast, crew and sets as the TV series. Very little of it was shot on location. It was a co-production between ATN 7 and Universal.

Richard Lane says the film was made because the series had ended with the cast still five weeks under contract. ATN-7 decided to make a feature film version with the idea that if it was not good enough for theatres it could play on television.

The film features appearances by a young Kate Fitzpatrick and Garry McDonald with hair.

== Reception ==
The film was the 19th most popular movie at the Australian box office in 1969.
