= The Sundowners (novel) =

1952 book by Jon Cleary

- First US edition
- Author: Jon Cleary
- Language: English
- Publisher: Scribner (US); Werner Laurie (UK)
- Publication date: 1952
- Publication place: Australia

The Sundowners is a 1952 novel by Australian writer Jon Cleary.

== Plot ==
The story is set in the Australian Outback during the 1920s and deals with one year in the life of the Carmody family. Paddy Carmody, Australian-born son of Irish migrants, is an itinerant worker, travelling the country with his wife Ida and son Sean in a horse-drawn wagon. Whilst Ida longs to settle in a place of their own, Paddy is unwilling to abandon his way of life and continues to pick up work where he can. He takes cattle-droving jobs and also sheep-shearing – which he doesn't like, but pays well.

At one point, he joins a shearing team with Sean as tarboy and Ida as the shearers' cook.

They meet various colourful outback characters, ranging from prosperous graziers to drunks, including Rupert Venneker, a well-educated Englishman in self-imposed exile.

Along the way Sean develops from boy into young man, Venneker marries and settles in a small town, and the Carmodys continue on their way.

== Background ==
The book was based on stories Cleary had been told by his father, who ran away to Queensland when he was a teenager. Additional research was provided by C. E. W. Bean's On the Wool Track. Cleary wrote the novel in long-hand during the evenings after work while he was living in New York working as a journalist, with the manuscript typed out by his wife Joy.

== Adaptations ==
The novel was a great success, eventually selling over three million copies, and was well reviewed overseas. It was his second book to be published in the USA.

It was adapted for Australian radio in 1953 (with Rod Taylor playing Paddy), and film rights were purchased by the American producer Joseph Kaufman, then in Australia to make Long John Silver (1954). Kaufman commissioned a script from Australian author Kay Keavney. No movie resulted, but the rights then transferred to Fred Zinneman who directed a film version in 1960. Stills from this film were used in a 1961 adaptation for the TV series Telestory, where the novel was read by actor Leonard Teale.

The character of Sean Carmody later appeared in Cleary's novel The City of Fading Light.
