= Season of Doubt =

Novel by Jon Cleary

- First UK edition
- Author: Jon Cleary
- Language: English
- Publisher: Collins (UK); William Morrow (US)
- Publication date: 1968
- Publication place: Australia

Season of Doubt is a 1968 novel written by Australian author Jon Cleary set in Beirut. Cleary and his wife researched the novel by traveling extensively through the city.

In August 1966 Cleary said he had sold the film rights to Mark Robson, who had also bought The Long Pursuit; at that stage the novel was called Remember Jack Hoxie - but Cleary renamed it and used the Hoxie title on another novel.
