= You Can't See 'Round Corners (TV series) =

1967 Australian TV series

- Genre: Drama; Military
- Created by: Jon Cleary
- Written by: Richard Lane; Michael Boddy
- Starring: Ken Shorter; Rowena Wallace
- Country of origin: Australia
- No. of seasons: 1
- No. of episodes: 26

Production
- Running time: 30 minutes

Original release
- Network: Seven Network
- Release: 28 June 1967 – 1967

You Can't See 'Round Corners is an Australian drama and military TV series that aired on the Seven Network for 26 episodes from 28 June 1967 based on the 1947 novel by Jon Cleary, updated to be set during the Vietnam War. It was directed by David Cahill and shot around Sydney in black and white, and was adapted into a film version in 1969.

== Cast ==
=== Main ===
- Ken Shorter as Frankie McCoy
- Lyndall Barbour as Mrs. McCoy
- Rowena Wallace as Margie Harris
- Judith Fisher as Peg Clancy
- Slim De Grey as Mick Patterson

== Production ==
Jim Oswin of ATN-7 asked Richard Lane if he knew of an Australian novel to adapt. Lane suggested Jon Cleary's You Can't See Round Corners which was a favourite of Lane's wife, updated to the Vietnam War. Oswin agreed. The novel was set in Paddington but Lane thought that suburb had changed so much by the 1960s he relocated it to Newtown. Lane wrote the first 17 scripts and was consultant on the last nine.

This was Rowena Wallace's first professional dramatic TV series. She was recommended by Barry Creyton who was originally going to play the role of Frankie McCoy, the role that went to Ken Shorter.

The series garnered controversy on release because of a scene where Frankie, an army deserter, runs his hand up Margie's skirt. Wallace says she had no idea Shorter was going to do this, which is why her reaction was so authentic. Many stations around Australia cut the scene.

The majority of episodes were written by Richard Lane. The theme and incidental music was composed by Tommy Tycho. Peter Weir worked on the show as a production assistant.

== Reception ==
The show was generally well received.

== See also ==
- List of television plays broadcast on ATN-7
