= The High Commissioner (novel) =

Book by Jon Cleary

- First UK edition
- Author: Jon Cleary
- Language: English
- Series: Scobie Malone series
- Genre: Detective
- Publisher: Collins (UK); William Morrow (US)
- Publication date: 1966
- Publication place: Australia
- Followed by: Helga's Web

The High Commissioner is a 1966 detective novel by Australian author Jon Cleary which introduced the detective hero Scobie Malone.

== Plot ==
Sergeant Scobie Malone of the Sydney police is sent by the New South Wales Premier, Flannery, to London where he is to arrest the Australian High Commissioner James Quentin for the murder of his first wife. He arrives to discover someone is trying to assassinate the High Commissioner for his work at a Vietnam War peace conference. Quentin asks for five days grace so he can complete his work at the conference, and Malone gets permission to agree to this, on the proviso he keep a close eye on Quentin. He pretends to be a member of Quentin's security detail and none of Quentin's household know the truth: not his wife Sheila, secretary Lisa, or butler Josef. However, Sheila soon deduces Malone's real agenda.

The person behind the assassination attempt is Madame Cholon, a Vietnamese crime figure, who has hired three men, Truong Tho, Pallain and Pham Chinh, to kill Quentin. She is being followed by Jamaica, a black CIA agent, who warns Malone away from her. Two detectives from Special Branch, Denzil and Coburn, are called in to investigate after an initial assassination attempt on Quentin. Later Truong goes to Australia House to deposit a bomb but is spotted by Malone. In the ensuring chase Truong is hit by a car and blows up.

Malone later visits a gambling den with Lisa, trying to find Madame Cholon. While outside Pham Chin tries to run him over but does not succeed. Malone begins to develop romantic feelings towards Lisa, and starts suspecting that Quentin may be innocent.

Madame Cholon is visited by two Chinese agents who tell her to stop the attempts on Quentin's life, or else. Cholon thinks that Jamaica was responsible for informing on her and orders his assassination. Before he dies he reveals to Cholon that Josef the butler is a double agent also working for the Russians and the Chinese. Cholon blackmails him into killing Quentin with an explosive alarm clock.

Malone eventually discovers that Quentin's first wife was actually killed by Sheila. Josef has a change of heart and tells Sheila about Madame Cholon's plan. She takes the clock to see Cholon and detonates it, killing both of them. The charges against Quentin are dropped and he decides to go to Malaysia to be a surveyor under the Colombo Plan. Malone returns to Australia, intending to ask Lisa to marry him.

== Background ==
Cleary says he got the idea for the novel from meeting an Australian policeman he knew walking out of Australia House in London one day. He was on six months leave but Cleary wondered what if he had come to arrest the Australian High Commissioner for murder.

He wrote it in London over three months.

== Opening ==
The first sentence of the book was: The Premier said, "We want you to go to London and arrest the High Commissioner for murder." This opening garnered much critical praise and a striking first sentence would become a feature of the later books in the series.

== Reception ==
The novel was a best seller and turned into a 1968 film, Nobody Runs Forever, starring Rod Taylor as Malone. It led to a sequel, Helga's Web, and a whole series of Scobie Malone novels.
