= David Denholm =

Australian author and historian

David Denholm, Ph.D. (8 April 1924 – 19 June 1997) was an Australian author and historian who published fiction under the pseudonym David Forrest, and history under his own name.

== Life and career ==
Denholm was born in Maryborough, Queensland, and was a scholarship boy at the Brisbane Church of England Grammar School. He fought in World War II with the 59th Battalion (Australia).

Denholm was an adult learner who entered Queensland University in 1964, graduating in 1967. He went on to earn the PhD in history at the Australian National University in 1972. He taught at the University of New England, and then, after 1974, at the Riverina College of Advanced Education, which is now part of Charles Sturt University. Denholm continued to research on Australian and family history until he died, after a short illness, in Wagga Wagga in 1997.

== Writing ==
Denholm is perhaps best known for his book on Australian history, The Colonial Australians. John Hirst, writing in The Monthly in 2006, placed it on his brief list of the best Australian history books of all-time. Elsewhere, Hirst describes The Colonial Australians as an "underrated" work that "explores... the nature of colonial society by examining its physical remains," and Denholm as the historian who "best understands" the sense in which that the culture of a colony is as old as the culture of the mother country.

He first came to national and international attention with his debut novel, The Last Blue Sea (1959, written under the pen-name "David Forrest"), about the conflict between Australia and Japan during World War II. The novel, which emphasized the difficulty the Anzacs experienced in fighting in the heat and rain of New Guinea, has been called "the classic short novel of the New Guinea campaign." He also wrote The Hollow Woodheap (1962), and a notable short story The Barambah Mob (1963), a humorous (and often anthologised) cricketing tale. His book-length essay, The Colonial Australians (1975) was a bestseller. The Last Blue Sea won the first Mary Gilmore Prize.

== Bibliography ==
=== Novels ===
All as by David Forrest

- The Last Blue Sea (1959)
- The Hollow Woodheap (1962)

=== Criticism ===
- Patrick White (1962)

=== Published letters ===
- Corresponding voices : the letters of Bill Scott and David Denholm, 1963-1997. edited by Zita Denholm. 2000.

=== Oral History ===
- David Denholm interviewed by Hazel de Berg in 1979. In the interview, Denholm describes the process of writing "The Colonial Australians", his method of work and his sources.
