= The Pulse of Danger =

Book by Jon Cleary

- First UK edition
- Author: Jon Cleary
- Language: English
- Publisher: Collins (UK); William Morrow (US)
- Publication date: 1966
- Publication place: Australia

The Pulse of Danger is a 1966 novel written by Australian author Jon Cleary. It is set in Bhutan with the background of the Sino-Indian War. A small group of Western botanists have just finished an expedition and are returning to India where they encounter an Indian officer who has a captured Chinese general. They are pursued by Chinese forces.

Cleary visited the region as part of his research.

Film rights were bought by Sydney Box but no movie was made.
