= Mask of the Andes =

Book by Jon Cleary

- First UK edition
- Author: Jon Cleary
- Language: English
- Publisher: Collins (UK); William Morrow (US)
- Publication date: 1971
- Publication place: Australia

Mask of the Andes, also known as The Liberators in the US, is a 1971 novel written by Australian author Jon Cleary set in Bolivia, where Cleary spent several weeks.

Cleary says he had been thinking about its themes for over ten years. The result was one of his most critically acclaimed works, with some critics drawing comparison to Graham Greene. In 1975 Cleary said he thought it was his best book to date.

The book did not sell well in Britain, the US or Australia, but was a big seller in Germany and South America. Cleary even received a fan letter from some of Che Guevara's former guerrillas.
