= Scobie Malone =

Fictional character by John Cleary

- First appearance: The High Commissioner
- Last appearance: Degrees of Connection
- Created by: Jon Cleary
- Portrayed by: Rod Taylor; Jack Thompson

In-universe information
- Gender: Male
- Occupation: Policeman
- Nationality: Australian

Scobie Malone is a fictional Sydney homicide detective created by Australian novelist Jon Cleary.

== History ==
Named after the jockey Scobie Breasley, Malone made his first appearance in Cleary's 1966 novel The High Commissioner. Cleary says he got the idea from meeting an Australian policeman he knew walking out of Australia House in London one day. He was on six months leave but Cleary wondered what if he had come to arrest the Australian High Commissioner for murder.

Although the original novel was a best seller and turned into a film, Cleary did not originally intend to create a series around Malone. However, he brought the character back later for Helga's Web (1970) as a means to explore the construction of the Sydney Opera House, then for Ransom (1973). There was a long gap before he started using the detective again, but once he did he wrote Malone novels regularly from 1987 onwards until the end of his writing career.

Cleary and his wife used to travel two months every year to research his books. However, after Cleary's daughter died in 1987, his wife became ill and did not want to travel. As Cleary liked to research his books thoroughly this meant he had to write about Australia.

I wondered how if I were to write about Australia would I keep my overseas readers. I'd written three Malone tales but was resisting publishers' urging to write more because I didn't want to get trapped by it. Then I realised I could use him by hanging it on crime, which immediately intrigued the international market, and write about what it was like living in Sydney in the late 80s and through the 90s.

"I'm trying to write something more than detective novels", said Cleary in 1989. "I am offended if my book is called a potboiler."

Cleary admits that sales of the last few Malone books declined and he decided to end the series before his publishers did. He also felt he was running creatively dry. "When I found myself making notes on a serial killer, I knew that I'd got to the bottom of the barrel because that's the cliche in crime writing today", he said in 2004.

== Personality and Attributes ==
Cleary once stated that, "There's more than a bit of me in Scobie. We both come from fighting Irish stock, we're both from Erskineville, the wrong side of the tracks, and both of us slugged our way up." Malone was a Catholic family man with rigid principles who mostly worked in Sydney, although his adventures occasionally took him overseas.

Malone was described in The High Commissioner as:

Tall, six feet. His face was too bony to be handsome, but [Inspector] Leeds guessed women would find the eyes attractive: they were dark, almost Latin, and they were friendly. The mouth, too, was friendly. Malone gave the impression of being easy-going, but there was a competence about him that had marked him for promotion from his first days in the force.

In the same novel it is mentioned that Scobie once played a game for New South Wales in the Sheffield Shield as a bowler and was "belted... all over the field".

== Other characters ==
Regular characters in the series included:

- Malone's Dutch wife Lisa, who when he first met her was working as Sir James Quentin's secretary in The High Commissioner. She was based on Cleary's wife Joy.
- Malone's partner Sergeant Russ Clements, who eventually became head of Homicide.
- Commissioner John Leeds, Malone's superior.
- His father Con and mother Brigid (based on Cleary's parents).
- His children Claire, Tom and Maureen (based on Cleary's grandchildren).

== Style ==
A noted feature of the books was starting them with a striking opening sentence.

== Adaptations ==
There have been two feature film adaptations of Malone novels. Cleary was dissatisfied with both. He did not do the adaptation of Nobody Runs Forever (1968), which he thought "had no sense of humour at all" and lacked reality.

He wrote a script for Helga's Web which was not used in the film that was eventually titled Scobie Malone (1975). "When I saw Scobie nibbling on the fourth nipple I thought "that's not my Scobie"", said Cleary.

In 1997 Peter Yeldham adapted Dark Summer for a proposed telemovie but this was never made.

Cleary thought Rachael Blake would have made the perfect Lisa.

== Novels ==
1. The High Commissioner (1966) – Scobie is sent to London to arrest the Australian High Commissioner who is in the middle of a peace conference for the Vietnam War.
2. Helga's Web (1970) – the body of a high class call girl is found in the basement of the Sydney Opera House.
3. Ransom (1973) – Scobie's wife Lisa is kidnapped while they are honeymooning in New York City.
4. Dragons at the Party (1987) – the aide to an exiled Pacific Island President is killed
5. Now and Then, Amen (1988) – Scobie investigates the death of a nun discovered near a brothel.
6. Babylon South (1989) – Scobie investigates the discovery of the remains of the one-time head of ASIO who went missing over twenty years ago.
7. Murder Song (1990) – a sniper serial killer is on the loose in Sydney.
8. Pride's Harvest (1991) – Scobie investigates the death of a Japanese farm manager in a country town.
9. Dark Summer (1992) – a dead body is found in Scobie's swimming pool.
10. Bleak Spring (1993) – Scobie investigates the murder of his daughter's boyfriend's father
11. Autumn Maze (1994) – the Police Minister's son is murdered
12. Winter Chill (1995) – Scobie struggles with his wife's illness while investigating the death of an American lawyer shot to death in Sydney
13. Endpeace (1996) – a wealthy newspaper tycoon is shot in his own bed
14. A Different Turf (1997) – Scobie investigates a series of shootings in the gay community
15. Five Ring Circus (1998) – in the lead up to the 2000 Sydney Olympics an investor in an Olympic development is assassinated and Scobie uncovers a scam involving money from Hong Kong
16. Dilemma (1999) – Scobie returns to the bush town of Collamundra to apprehend a husband who disappeared after the murder of his wife four years ago and finds himself investigating the Crown Prosecutor
17. Bear Pit (2000) – the State Premier is shot by a sniper in the lead up to the 2000 Sydney Olympics.
18. Yesterday's Shadow (2001) – two people are murdered in one hotel on the same night. one of whom is the wife of the American ambassador – Scobie also comes across an ex-girlfriend
19. The Easy Sin (2002) – Scobie investigates the death of a dotcom millionaire's housemaid, which he feels is a kidnapping gone wrong.
20. Degrees of Connection (2004) – Scobie and Russ Clements investigate the death of the secretary to the tycoon of a development corporation.

== Film adaptations ==
- Nobody Runs Forever (1968), starring Rod Taylor as Scobie Malone, with Christopher Plummer, Lilli Palmer and Camilla Sparv (as Lisa) – based on The High Commissioner
- Scobie Malone (1975), starring Jack Thompson as Scobie Malone, with Judy Morris, Shane Porteous (as Clements) and Jacqueline Kott – based on Helga's Web
- Ransom was filmed twice for Japanese television
