= You Can't See 'Round Corners (novel) =

Novel by Jon Cleary

- First US edition
- Author: Jon Cleary
- Language: English
- Publisher: Scribners (US)
- Publication date: 1947
- Publication place: Australia

You Can't See 'Round Corners is a 1947 novel by Australian author Jon Cleary. It was his first published novel.

== Plot ==
Frankie McCoy, a bookie from Paddington, Sydney, is drafted into the Australian Army during World War II. He ends up deserting and going on the run. His girlfriend Margie breaks up with him so he seeks solace in the arms of a more sexually experienced woman, Myra. He incurs gambling debts and robs a store, accidentally killing Myra. As the military police close in he is killed by a car.

== History ==
The novel took Cleary over eight months to write. He began it during his war service in New Guinea and finished it on a boat trip from Sydney to England after World War II, the same voyage on which he met his wife Joy.

Cleary based the book on incidents and people he witnessed when he worked in the Sydney suburb of Paddington at age 18:

Frankie McCoy, the hero of the novel, is a composite of types I met, and who for all their faults I admire. When first I went to Paddington as a boy I tended to be snobbish about the people I met there. It.was not long before I learned to admire their pluck in the face of poverty, their generosity, and their dogged refusal to accept defeat – they battle on and don't whine. I always remember the case of one girl – she was not what nice people call nice, she was immoral and she swore. But one Christmas Eve, out of her week's earnings of 55/ she gave 20/ to a boy who was the eldest of a family of five in the poorest circumstances, and who was earning only 15/ a week. I never forgot that."

Cleary originally wrote the book in first person perspective but later rewrote it in the third person. He says he wrote the novel on instinct. "You really can't sit down and plan it; you do it and there it is."

His editor for the UK edition was Graham Greene.

== Reception ==
You Can't See 'Round Corners was well-received critically, winning second prize in The Sydney Morning Herald's novel contest, losing to Ruth Park's The Harp in the South. It was praised by such writers as Dymphna Cusack. However, Cleary was not able to support himself full time with his writing until the publication of The Sundowners a few years later.

The Age said "As a piece of writing it is well-built, lhas vitality and a certain wit. It is nevertheless an unpleasant book."

The Argus declared "is competently written, and local enough to be of particular interest to Australians."

== Adaptations ==
The film rights were sold almost immediately to Paramount as a possible vehicle for Alan Ladd. However the US government were having trouble with deserters in Europe at the time and this fell through. The novel was adapted into a TV series in 1967, where the action was updated to the Vietnam War. This series in turn was adapted into a film in 1969.

== See also ==
- 1947 in Australian literature
