= Strike Me Lucky (novel) =

Novel by Jon Cleary

- First edition
- Author: Jon Cleary; Joy Cleary
- Language: English
- Publisher: Ure Smith
- Publication date: 1959
- Publication place: Australia
- Pages: 234

Strike Me Lucky is a 1959 novel written by Jon Cleary in collaboration with his wife Joy. The plot concerns an Australian family who discover gold and the effect this has on their small town.

== Background ==
Cleary originally wrote it as a short story for the Saturday Evening Post. Later while the Clearys were living in Spain, Joy was at a loose end and decided to adapt the story into a novel, which Jon then rewrote. It was published under her name and enjoyed minor success. It was based on a story "Trumpets of Home" which was based on a true story.

Marlon Brando optioned the film rights for his production company Pennebaker, intending to make it as a co-production in England, but no movie was made. However Jon Cleary did later adapt it into a play in 1969.

== Critical reception ==
In The Bulletin a reviewer noted: "Joy Cleary, who is Jon Cleary’s wife (this is her first novel), may have had her eye on the films when writing the story, for it builds up into just the sort of climax Hollywood likes, with the schoolmaster and the glamorous Gina dashing madly in an old Rolls Royce from one public meeting to another to cope with various uproars, and with the Town Drunk at last blowing-up the mine which has by then run-out of gold...It would have been better, really, if Mrs. Cleary had kept her eye on Australia in the way, say, that Chevallier keeps his eye on France, for these people are not very real, and, consequently, are not profoundly comic. But it could make a most diverting film, and on its superficial level it reads crisply and amusingly."
