= Jon Cleary =

Australian writer (1917–2010)

- Born: Jon Stephen Cleary; 22 November 1917; Erskineville, New South Wales, Australia
- Died: 19 July 2010 (aged 92); New South Wales, Australia
- Occupation: Writer
- Spouse(s): Joy Cleary (m. 1946–2003; her death)
- Children: 2
- Writing career
- Years active: 1942–2007
- Genres: Drama, crime fiction
- Notable works: The Sundowners, Scobie Malone series

Jon Stephen Cleary (22 November 1917 – 19 July 2010) was an Australian writer and novelist. He wrote numerous books, including The Sundowners (1951), a portrait of a rural family in the 1920s as they move from one job to the next, and The High Commissioner (1966), the first of a long series of popular detective stories featuring Sydney Police Inspector Scobie Malone. A number of Cleary's works have been the subject of film and television adaptations.

== Early life and war service ==
=== Early life ===
Cleary was born in Erskineville, Sydney and educated at Marist Brothers College, Randwick. When he was ten his father spent six months in Long Bay Gaol for stealing five pounds. Debt collectors took everything in the Cleary household "except a piano and my mother's double bed", said Cleary. "I remember sitting on the steps with Mum, who was weeping bitterly, and she said, 'Don't ever owe anything to anybody.' That sticks with you, and it's why I gained a justifiable reputation for being tight with money." However he added that "the night after we were repossessed, our friends turned up with chairs, an old table, cakes, sandwiches – they were all battlers but they helped out."

Cleary left school in 1932, aged 14, to help his family financially. He spent the following eight years doing a variety of jobs, notably as a commercial artist for Austral Toon under Eric Porter. He wrote his first story in 1938 at the request of Joe Morley, a journalist friend of Cleary's father. It was a piece about being unemployed which Cleary did not finish because he thought it was self-pitying but he found he did enjoy the process of writing.

=== War service ===
Cleary enlisted in the Australian army on 27 May 1940 and served in the Middle East before being transferred to the Military History Unit. He served for a time in New Guinea, where his clerk was Lee Robinson, and was discharged on 10 October 1945 with the rank of lieutenant.

== Writing career ==
=== Early stories ===
Cleary began writing regularly in the army, selling his first story in 1940. The following year he won £50 prize writing a story for the Daily Mirror. It was killed by the censor but the newspaper hired Cleary to write a weekly story. He began also to write for The Australian Journal, whose editor sent four of Cleary's short stories to American agent Paul Reynolds, who began selling them to American magazines such as Cosmopolitan and The Saturday Evening Post. and in 1945 won equal first prize in a competition for the ABC for his radio play Safe Horizon. In 1946 a collection of his short stories was published called These Small Glories.

=== You Can't See 'Round Corners ===
Cleary's first novel was the 1947 work, You Can't See 'Round Corners, about the life of an army deserter wanted for the sensational murder of his girlfriend in wartime Sydney. Cleary started writing this in the army and finished it on board a ship en route to London where he had hoped to find work as a screenwriter. Instead he worked as a journalist for the Australia News and Information Bureau from 1948 to 50, a job he continued in New York from 1950 to 51.

He continued writing short stories and novels. His second novel, The Long Shadow (1949) was a thriller, a genre he tackled at the suggestion of his editor Graham Greene. Just Let Me Be (1950) was set in Coogee, and was later filmed for British TV.

=== The Sundowners ===
While in New York Cleary wrote his fourth published novel, The Sundowners, based on stories of his father. It was published in 1952 and sold three million copies, enabling Cleary to write full-time.

Cleary lived in Italy for a year then returned home to Australia in 1953 after seven years away.

His fifth novel, The Climate of Courage (1954), was based on his war experiences and sold well in Australia and Britain. He visited the Kimberley region in 1954, and the result was Justin Bayard (1955) (later filmed as Dust in the Sun (1958)).

=== International writer ===
Cleary then went back to live in London. His novels became increasingly set in countries other than Australia, with Cleary travelling extensively for the purposes of research.

"I realised at 40 I did not have the intellectual depth to be the writer I would like to be, so I determined to be as good a craftsman as I might be", Cleary said later on.

He had written a book about Australian politics, The Mayor's Nest, but his English publisher was worried it would not appeal to an international audience, and suggested a book on motor racing. Cleary had lived in Italy and become familiar with the motor races there. He wrote The Green Helmet in Spain in twenty days, and it became a best seller on its publication in 1957. Cleary also wrote the script for the 1961 film version.

He contributed to the script for The Siege of Pinchgut (1959) and helped rewrite the script to The Sundowners (1960) but his focus remained on novels: Back of Sunset (1959) was about the Australian Flying Doctors service; Strike Me Lucky (1959) was credited solely to his wife Joy but had been reworked by Cleary; North from Thursday (1960) was set in New Guinea; The Country of Marriage (1962) was set in England; Forests of the Night (1963) was set in Burma; A Flight of Chariots (1963) was about astronauts; The Fall of an Eagle (1965) was set in Anatolia; The Pulse of Danger (1966) was set in Bhutan.

He had time for script work, contributing to the screenplay for Damon and Pythias (1962) and writing an un-used draft for The Diamond Smugglers.

=== Scobie Malone ===
While in London, Cleary got the idea for a book about an Australian detective who has to arrest the Australian High Commissioner. The High Commissioner (1966) introduced the world to detective Scobie Malone although initially it was meant to be a stand-alone book. The novel sold well and was turned into a film Nobody Runs Forever (1968).

Cleary followed it with The Long Pursuit (1967), set during World War II, originally written as a film script.

In 1966 Cleary returned to Australia after three years abroad and sold his Pittwater House to buy one at Kirribilli. He said "I'm a professional craftsman and I should be judged on those standards. I like to think I'm a little better than a potboiler. If I was a pot boiler I would never take off eight months to write a novel."

Cleary said 50% of his screenplays had been filmed by that stage and that he had recently turned down $50,000 to write a TV series set in the South Pacific. "Financially I could retire, mentally I couldn't," he said. He was working on a "social comedy" called The Ballad of Fingal McBride.

He then wrote Season of Doubt (1968), set in Beirut, and Remember Jack Hoxie (1969), set in the world of pop music.

=== Return to Australia ===
In the 1970s, Cleary returned to Sydney to live permanently, buying a block of land at Kirribilli opposite the Sydney Opera House, next to businessman Eric McClintock. Cleary built a house on this block and it became his home for the rest of his life. During the 1970s and 1980s Cleary continued to travel two months of the year to research his novels.

He wanted to write about the Opera House so Scobie Malone returned for Helga's Web (1970), which was later filmed (Cleary wrote a script which was not used). Mask of the Andes (1971) was set in Bolivia and Man's Estate (1972) among the British upper class.

Cleary returned to Scobie Malone for Ransom (1973), set in New York, but then stopped writing about the detective as he did not wish to be trapped as a writer. He did Peter's Pence (1974) a thriller; The Safe House (1975), about World War II; A Sound of Lightning (1976), set in Montana. He also wrote the screenplay for Sidecar Racers (1975).

Cleary had a big-selling success with High Road to China (1977), an adventure story later filmed in 1982. Vortex (1978) was about tornados; The Beaufort Sisters (1979), about sisters from Kansas; A Very Private War (1980) was about coastwatchers in World War II; The Faraway Drums (1981) was about a plot to assassinate King George V; The Golden Sabre (1982) was set during the 1917 Russian Revolution; Spearfield's Daughter (1983) was later filmed as a mini series; The Phoenix Tree (1984) was set in Japan during World War II; The City of Fading Light (1985) was set in 1939 Berlin.

=== Return of Scobie Malone ===
After Cleary's daughter's death from breast cancer in 1987, and his wife's subsequent ill health he travelled less. Writing the Scobie Malone series of novels enabled him to tell Australian stories which appealed to an international audience, and he remained popular with readers throughout his career. Malone returned in Dragons at the Party (1987), about the Australian Bicentennial, then was in Now and Then, Amen (1988), Babylon South (1989), Murder Song (1990), Pride's Harvest (1991), Dark Summer (1992), Bleak Spring (1993), Autumn Maze (1994), Winter Chill (1995), Endpeace (1996), A Different Turf (1997), Five Ring Circus (1998), Dilemma (1999), Bear Pit (2000), Yesterday's Shadow (2001), The Easy Sin (2002) and Degrees of Connection (2004). He then wound up the series, feeling he was getting stale.

=== Final novels ===
He published three more novels, all set in Australia: Miss Ambar Regrets (2004), Morning's Gone (2006) and Four-Cornered Circle (2007), then retired.

== Personal life ==
Cleary met his wife Joy on his boat trip to England in 1946 and married her five days after they landed. They had two daughters, Catherine and Jane, the latter of whom died of breast cancer at age 37, predeceasing both of her parents. Joy Cleary developed Alzheimer's disease and went to live in a nursing home prior to her death in 2003."I was very, very lucky", said Cleary of his marriage. "We were in love from the day we met to the day we – sorry, I mean she – died."

Cleary was good friends with fellow writers Morris West and Alexander Baron. He was a regular churchgoer, attending Mass every Sunday. For the last three years of his life, he was in ill-health, attended by a full-time carer, and in and out of hospital with heart problems. He died on 19 July 2010, aged 92. The eulogy at his funeral was delivered by his friend and neighbour Sir Eric McClintock.

== Assessment ==
During his lifetime, Cleary was one of the most popular Australian authors of all time. According to Murray Waldren, "his own assessment was that he lacked a poetic eye but had an eye for colour and composition and was strong on narrative and dialogue. And he took pride in the research underpinning his works."

Cleary once stated that the book which had most influenced him was The Power and the Glory by Graham Greene. "He caught perfectly the almost heroism of a man who would have been shocked to hear that he was a hero ... I've always said that Greene could say more in one phrase than most writers in a chapter."

== Awards ==
- 1944 – Australian Broadcasting Commission prize for radio drama (Safe Horizon)
- 1950 – Australian Literary Society's Crouch Medal for Best Australian Novel (Just Let Me Be)
- 1975 – Edgar Award from the Mystery Writers of America for Best Novel (Peter's Pence)
- 1996 – Australian Crime Writers Association Lifetime Achievement Award
- 1996 – Ned Kelly Award for Lifelong Contribution to the Crime, Mystery and Detective Genres
- 2004 – Ned Kelly Award for Best Novel (Degrees of Connection)

== Bibliography ==
=== Scobie Malone novels ===
- The High Commissioner (1966)
- Helga's Web (1970)
- Ransom (1973)
- Dragons at the Party (1987)
- Now and Then, Amen (1988)
- Babylon South (1989)
- Murder Song (1990)
- Pride's Harvest (1991)
- Dark Summer (1992)
- Bleak Spring (1993)
- Autumn Maze (1994)
- Winter Chill (1995)
- Endpeace (1996)
- A Different Turf (1997)
- Five Ring Circus (1998)
- Dilemma (1999)
- Bear Pit (2000)
- Yesterday's Shadow (2001)
- The Easy Sin (2002)
- Degrees of Connection (2003)

=== Other novels ===
- You Can't See 'Round Corners (1947)
- The Long Shadow (1949)
- Just Let Me Be (1950)
- The Sundowners (1952)
- The Climate of Courage (1954)
- Justin Bayard (1955) (aka Dust in the Sun)
- The Green Helmet (1957)
- Back of Sunset (1959)
- Strike Me Lucky (1959) – co-wrote (uncredited) with his wife Joy
- North From Thursday (1960)
- The Country of Marriage (1962)
- Forests of the Night (1963)
- A Flight of Chariots (1963)
- The Fall of an Eagle (1964)
- The Pulse of Danger (1966)
- The Long Pursuit (1967)
- Season of Doubt (1968)
- Remember Jack Hoxie (1969)
- Mask of the Andes (1971) (aka The Liberators)
- Man's Estate (1972) (aka The Ninth Marquess)
- Peter's Pence (1974)
- The Safe House (1975)
- A Sound of Lightning (1976)
- High Road to China (1977)
- Vortex (1978)
- The Beaufort Sisters (1979)
- A Very Private War (1980)
- The Faraway Drums (1981)
- The Golden Sabre (1981)
- Spearfield's Daughter (1982)
- The Phoenix Tree (1984)
- The City of Fading Light (1985)
- You, the Jury (1990) (reprint of 1950 Just Let Me Be)
- Miss Ambar Regrets (2004)
- Morning's Gone (2006)
- Four-Cornered Circle (2007)

=== Short stories ===
- The Way Out (1942)
- Remember? (1943)
- A Long Time Dying (1943)
- Clouds in the Sun (1943)
- Idyll in Havoc (1943)
- Safe Horizon (1943)
- Hullo, Joe (1944)
- I'd Like to Be There at the Finish (1944)
- Who Pays? (1944)
- Death Comes Slowly (1944)
- Title Bout (1945)
- Brandy Martin and My Old Man (1945)
- My Heart is Dead and Gone
- Some Day I May Come Home Again (1945)
- These Small Glories (1946) – a collection of his short stories
- Late Date (1946)
- The Stranger (1946)
- See You on the Bus (1946)
- Sundowner on the Skylin (1946)
- A Time Together
- Pillar of Salt (1951)
- The Outsider (1951)
- No Taste for Trouble (1954)
- Man from Carolina (1958)
- Friendly Enemies (1961)
- Pillar of Salt and other Stories (1963) – collection

=== Films ===
- Dust in the Sun (Justin Bayard) (1958), starring Jill Adams and Ken Wayne – original novel only
- The Siege of Pinchgut (1959) – screenplay only
- The Sundowners (1960), starring Robert Mitchum, Deborah Kerr, Glynis Johns, and Peter Ustinov – based on his novel, did uncredited rewrite on script
- The Green Helmet (1961), starring Bill Travers, Ed Begley, and Sid James – based on his novel, wrote script
- Strike Me Lucky (1961) – unfilmed script based on his novel
- Damon and Pythias (1962) – uncredited contribution to script
- The Sea Lab (1963) – unfilmed script based on his short story
- A Restful Change (1960s) – unfilmed script
- The Diamond Smugglers (1964) – unfilmed script based on book by Ian Fleming
- The Belles of Long Ago (1965) – unfilmed treatment
- Nobody Runs Forever (The High Commissioner) (1968), starring Rod Taylor, Christopher Plummer, Lilli Palmer and Camilla Sparv – based on his novel only
- Season of Doubt – unfilmed script based on his novel
- You Can't See 'round Corners (1969) (adaptation of television series), starring Ken Shorter, Rowena Wallace and Carmen Duncan – based on his novel
- Sidecar Racers (1975) – screenplay only
- Scobie Malone (1975), starring Jack Thompson, Judy Morris, and Shane Porteous – film based on his novel Helga's Web (Cleary wrote a script that was not used.)
- A Summer of Roses (1970s) – unfilmed script
- The Climb (1970s) – unfilmed script
- Pirate and Son (1977) – unfilmed treatment for Burt Lancaster
- Foreign Territory – unfilmed script
- The Roundabout Road – unfilmed script
- An End to glory – unfilmed script adapted from an uncompleted novel
- The Delinquents – unfilmed treatment based on the novel by Kylie Tennant
- Seven Days at the Silbersteins
- High Road to China (1983), starring Bess Armstrong and Tom Selleck – based on his novel only

=== TV ===
- Just Let Me Be (1957) – Cleary did the adaptation of his novel
- Bus Stop (1961) – two episodes
- You Can't See 'Round Corners (1967), starring Ken Shorter, John Armstrong, Rowena Wallace and Carmen Duncan – based on his novel only
- Spearfield's Daughter (1986) (mini series), starring Christopher Plummer, Nancy Marchand, Kim Braden and Steve Railsback – based on his novel

=== Radio plays ===
- Debut (1943)
- Safe Horizon (1944)

=== Plays ===
- Strike Me Lucky (1969) – from the novel
- The Trumpets of Home

=== Unpublished novels ===
- story of an AIF soldier who goes overseas (1947)
- the story of a father and son in Sydney 1927–47 with the background of the Sydney Harbour Bridge (circa 1947)
- The Mayor's Nest (1956) – about Australian politics
- The Vacant Mine (1979) – uncompleted novel
