= Bushranger of the Skies =

1940 novel by Australian writer Arthur Upfield

- 1970 reprint edition
- Author: Arthur Upfield
- Language: English
- Series: Detective Inspector Napoleon 'Bony' Bonaparte
- Genre: Fiction
- Publisher: Angus & Robertson
- Publication date: 1940
- Publication place: Australia
- Media type: Print
- Pages: 314 pp
- Preceded by: The Mystery of Swordfish Reef
- Followed by: Death of a Swagman

Bushranger of the Skies (1940) is a novel by Australian writer Arthur Upfield. It is the eighth of the author's novels to feature his recurring character Detective Inspector Napoleon 'Bony' Bonaparte. It was originally published in the Australia by Angus & Robertson in 1940.

The novel is also known under the title No Footprints in the Bush.

== Abstract ==
While on his way to McPherson's Station to meet the local Police Sargeant, Bony witnesses a plane bomb the policeman's car, killing him instantly. Bony then continues on to the station determined to identify the murderer.

== Location ==
The action of the novel takes place at "McPherson's Station", 80 miles northwest of Shaw's Lagoon, South Australia.

== Publishing history ==
Following the book's initial publication by Angus & Robertson in 1940 it was subsequently published as follows:

- Doubleday Books, USA, 1944 (as No Footprints in the Bush)
- Penguin, UK, 1949 (as No Footprints in the Bush)

and subsequent paperback, ebook and audio book editions.

The novel was also translated into German in 1965.

== Critical reception ==
A reviewer in The Advertiser wrote of the novel: "Apart from the thrilling story Mr. Upfield conveys with a sure hand the atmosphere of the burning heart of Australia, and writes some really clever sketches of the aborigines and their customs. For these things alone the book is well worth reading."

Writing on the website "Vintage Pop Fictions", a critic stated: "The difficulty facing a man like Bony, caught between two cultures and with strong loyalties to both, is a major underlying theme of all the Bony stories but in this novel it takes centre stage. All the central characters in this story are in their own ways in the same position as Bony, caught halfway between cultures. Bony has come to terms with his own situation but the other characters have not...Upfield's treatment of these problems might seem old-fashioned but that's a superficial view. Once you put aside the fact that he uses terms that are now forbidden (such as half-caste) you'll find that his views on these matters are perceptive and deeply sympathetic. He refuses to idealise either the whites or the Aboriginals or those of mixed race but he is fundamentally sympathetic to all three points of view and he is also fundamentally optimistic. Of course the book was written in a much more optimistic age. Perhaps the tragedy of our own times is the we've lost that optimism."

== Television adaptation ==
The novel was adapted for television in 1973 in a one-hour episode, titled "Boney and the Black Clansman", of the Boney series. It was directed by Barry Davis, from a script by Ted Roberts.

== See also ==
- 1940 in Australian literature
