= Beautiful Stranger (disambiguation) =

"Beautiful Stranger" is a 1999 single by Madonna.

Beautiful Stranger may also refer to:

== Film and television ==
- A Beautiful Stranger (Piękna nieznajoma), a 1992 Polish film by Jerzy Hoffman
- Beautiful Stranger, an alternate title for the 1954 mystery film Twist of Fate
- Beautiful Strangers (TV series), a Philippine television series

== Books ==
- The Beautiful Stranger, a 1951 novel by Bernice Carey
- Beautiful Stranger, a 2001 novel by Heather Graham Pozzessere and Carla Cassidy
- Beautiful Strangers, a 2004 prose collection by the Romanian writer Mircea Cărtărescu
- Beautiful Stranger (Zoey Dean novel), a 2007 novel by Zoey Dean
- The Beautiful Stranger: The Rogues of Regent Street, a 2008 novel by Julia London
- Beautiful Stranger, the sequel to the 2013 novel Beautiful Bastard by Christina Lauren

== Music ==
- "Beautiful Stranger", a song by Nivek Ogre and Briana Evigan in the 2012 musical film The Devil's Carnival
- "Beautiful Stranger", a song from the 2012 EP "Electric Shock" by f(x)
- "Beautiful Stranger", a song from the 2011 album Girls' Generation by Girls' Generation
- "Beautiful Stranger", a song from the 2022 album Everything I Know About Love by Laufey
- "Beautiful Strangers", a 2016 song by Kevin Morby
- "Beautiful Strangers", the lead single from the 2025 Tomorrow X Together album The Star Chapter: Together

== See also ==
- "Finally // Beautiful Stranger", a 2019 promotional single by Halsey
