= Murchison Murders =

1930s murders in Western Australia

John Rowles
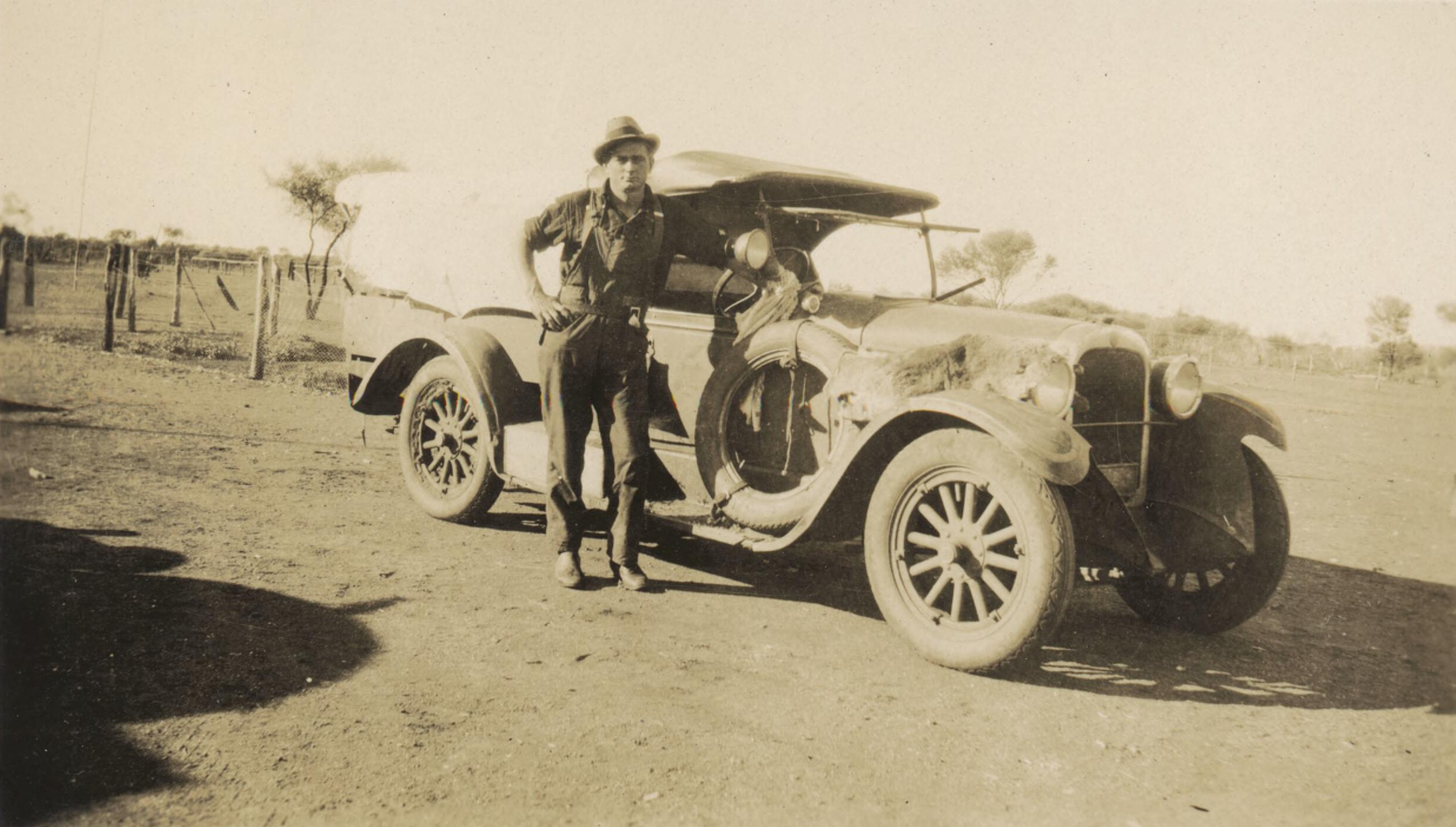
- Snowy Rowles standing beside James Ryan's car, photographed by Arthur Upfield
- Born: John Thomas Smith; 1905; North Perth, Western Australia, Australia
- Died: 13 June 1932 (aged 26); Fremantle Prison, Fremantle, Western Australia, Australia
- Cause of death: Execution by hanging
- Other name: Snowy Rowles
- Status: Executed
- Motive: Financial gain
- Convictions: Wilful murder Theft
- Penalty: Death

Details
- Victims: 3
- Span of crimes: 1929–1930
- Country: Australia
- State: Western Australia

The Murchison Murders were a series of three murders, committed by an itinerant stockman known as "Snowy" Rowles (born John Thomas Smith), near the rabbit-proof fence in Western Australia during the early 1930s. Rowles used the murder method that had been suggested by author Arthur Upfield in his then unpublished book The Sands of Windee, in which he described a foolproof way to dispose of a body and thus commit the perfect murder.

== Rowles ==
Rowles was born in 1905 in North Perth, Western Australia. His original name was John Thomas Smith. Prior to the murders, Rowles served three months in jail for theft.

== Upfield's search for a plot ==
Upfield had already written three novels, but was working as a fence boundary rider on the rabbit-proof fence in Western Australia. He had decided to write another detective novel, but with a plot difference: there would be no body for the detective to find. Unfortunately, he could not think of a way to dispose of a body.

He mentioned this difficulty to a colleague, George Ritchie. Ritchie devised a disposal method: burn the victim's body along with that of a large animal, sift any metal fragments out of the ashes, dissolve them in acid, pound any remaining bone fragments into dust, then discard the remains into the wind. But Upfield had a problem, as he believed the method was too efficient and would leave his character Bony (a fictional detective) with no way to detect or prove the murder.

Upfield challenged Ritchie to find a flaw in the method and offered him £1 if he could. Ritchie, however, was unable to do so. The plot of the novel hinged on this point. One day Ritchie met Rowles, whom Upfield also knew. Ritchie mentioned the problem to him. All of Upfield's friends and colleagues were soon aware of Upfield's difficulties with his plot.

On 5 October 1929, Upfield, Ritchie, Rowles, the son of an inspector of the fence, and a north boundary rider for the fence, were all present at the Camel Station homestead when the murder method for Upfield's book was again discussed. Upfield said that Rowles knew of the murder method before this date, but the meeting and discussion were later used as evidence in court to prove that Rowles was aware of the method.

== Ryan, Lloyd, and Carron disappear ==
In December 1929, Rowles was in the company of two men, James Ryan and George Lloyd. On 8 December 1929, Rowles, Ryan and Lloyd departed from Camel Station. Several days later, Ritchie arrived at Camel Station. He said he had met a prospector named James Yates. Yates had told Ritchie that he had seen Rowles driving a car; Rowles told Yates that Ryan and Lloyd were walking through the scrub, though Yates did not see them himself.

On Christmas Eve, 1929, Upfield was with a colleague in the small town of Youanmi when he met Rowles, who told him that Ryan had decided to stay in Mount Magnet and had lent him his truck. Rowles later told another person he had purchased Ryan's truck for £80.

A New Zealander named Louis Carron had arrived in the Murchison area in 1929, having come from Perth with a friend. He had found a job at Wydgee Station. In May 1930, Carron left his work and was seen with Rowles.

Rowles cashed Carron's pay cheque at the town of Paynesville, east of Mount Magnet. Carron's friend sent a reply-paid telegram to Rowles at Youanmi asking for information about Carron, but Rowles did not reply.

== Investigation and trial ==
Carron had kept regular correspondence with his friends, and thus his disappearance was noticed. The area at the time had a large transient population, and for a man to appear or disappear from the area was otherwise unremarkable.

It was not until police detectives started investigating Carron's disappearance that they learned that Lloyd and Ryan were also missing. Like Carron, they had last been seen in Rowles' company.

Upfield's attempts to find a plot for his novel The Sands of Windee were well known. The detectives soon learned about the method he proposed to hide a murder. They found the remains of Carron's body at the 183-mile (295 km) hut on the rabbit-proof fence. Among other items found was a wedding ring that would later be positively linked to Carron by both a New Zealand jeweller and Carron's wife.

Detective-Sergeant Manning was sent to arrest Rowles, and immediately recognised him as John Thomas Smith, a burglary convict who had escaped in 1928 from the local lock-up in Dalwallinu. Rowles was sent back to prison, giving Manning more time to investigate. While awaiting trial, Rowles attempted to commit suicide.

Rowles was tried only for the murder of Carron. Following the murders of Ryan and Lloyd, Rowles is believed to have strictly followed Upfield's fictional method for the disposal of evidence, leaving a total lack of physical evidence that could be used in a court. In the case of Carron, he had omitted one step – destroying all metal remains with acid. Several items which belonged to Carron were found and identified as his.

Carron had assumed a new name, and was previously known as Leslie George Brown. His wife, Mrs. Brown, had attended a jeweller in Auckland to have a wedding ring recut. The jeweller's assistant had accidentally used a 9-carat solder to rejoin the ends of the 18 carat ring. Normally he would have rectified this error but had been too busy to do so. The result was a distinctive mark on the ring from the different-coloured solder, which made the ring unique and identifiable as Carron's. (Upfield used the "mended ring" device in a later novel, The New Shoe.)

Evidence was provided to the court regarding Carron's items, Rowles's behaviour, his knowledge of the fictional murder method, and the various lies that Rowles had told about his movements.

There seemed to be no doubt that Rowles had committed three murders. On 19 March 1932, after two hours of deliberation, the jury found him guilty of the wilful murder of Louis Carron. Asked if he had anything to say, Rowles said, "Only this. I have been found guilty of a crime that has never been committed." Rowles was sentenced to death. His attempts to appeal his conviction were rejected.

Rowles was executed by hanging at Fremantle Prison on 13 June 1932.

== In media ==
Upfield's novel The Sands of Windee (1931) featured the method for hiding a murder. He later wrote about the events related to Rowles' actions, including his being charged and convicted of murder, in his novel The Murchison Murders.

In 1993, author Terry Walker wrote Murder on the Rabbit-Proof Fence, documenting the case.

In June 2009, the Australian Broadcasting Corporation produced a telemovie, 3 Acts of Murder, based on the Murchison Murders, starring Robert Menzies as Upfield and Luke Ford as Snowy Rowles. It was directed by filmmaker Rowan Woods.

== See also ==
- List of serial killers by country
