= The Bachelors of Broken Hill =

1950 novel by Australian writer Arthur Upfield

- Author: Arthur Upfield
- Language: English
- Series: Detective Inspector Napoleon 'Bony' Bonaparte
- Genre: Fiction
- Publisher: Doubleday
- Publication date: 1950
- Publication place: Australia
- Media type: Print
- Pages: 221 pp
- Preceded by: The Widows of Broome
- Followed by: The New Shoe

The Bachelors of Broken Hill (1950) is a novel by Australian writer Arthur Upfield. It is the fourteenth of the author's novels to feature his recurring character Detective Inspector Napoleon 'Bony' Bonaparte. It was originally published in USA by Doubleday in 1950 under their Crime Club imprint.

== Abstract ==
Bony is called in to investigated a spate of poisonings (of a draper and metallurgist), the attempted poisoning of a bookmaker and the stabbing of a office-stenographer of the Broken Hill police.

== Location ==
The action of the novel is set in and around Broken Hill, New South Wales.

== Publishing history ==
Following the book's initial publication by Doubleday in 1950 it was subsequently published as follows:

- Invincible Press, Australia, 1953
- Heinemann, UK and Australia, 1958
- Pan Books, UK, 1966
- Arkon Paperbacks, Australia, 1983
- Eden Paperbacks, Australia, 1987
- Hinkler Book Distributors, Australia, 1994
- Scribner Paperback Fiction, USA, 1998
- ETT Imprint, Australia, 2019

and subsequent paperback, ebook and audio book editions.

The novel was also translated into German and Italian in 1957, Spanish in 1958, Slovakian in 1976 and French in 2002.

== Critical reception ==
A reviewer in The Bulletin found the crime was "melodramatically solved", noting that "what would be a first-rate mystery for another author is a little disappointing in Upfield."

In The Tribune (Sydney) a reviewer called it a "classical murder mystery" that "should be in every collection of Australiana."

== See also ==
- 1950 in Australian literature
