= Death of a Lake =

1954 novel by Australian writer Arthur Upfield

- Author: Arthur Upfield
- Language: English
- Series: Detective Inspector Napoleon 'Bony' Bonaparte
- Genre: Fiction
- Publisher: Doubleday
- Publication date: 1954
- Publication place: Australia
- Media type: Print
- Pages: 188 pp
- Preceded by: Murder Must Wait
- Followed by: Sinister Stones

Death of a Lake (1954) is a novel by Australian writer Arthur Upfield. It is the eighteenth of the author's novels to feature his recurring character Detective Inspector Napoleon 'Bony' Bonaparte. It was originally published in USA by Doubleday in 1954 under their Crime Club imprint.

== Background ==
Upfield described some of the background to this novel in an interview he gave to a writer from The Sydney Morning Herald. He also provided some insight into his writing methods.

== Abstract ==
Detective-Inspector Bonaparte is working at a cattle station near Lake Otway disguised as a horse-breaker. He is there to investigate the disappearance of Ray Gillen who went missing about 15 months before the novel's start. Shortly before that time Gillen had won a sum of £12,000 in a lottery, but neither the money nor Gillen's body have been located.

== Location ==
The action of the novel is set in and around an area east of Menindee, New South Wales. The "lake" of the title is said to be Lake Otway, an ephemeral lake that fills occasionally in massive River Darling floods.

== Publishing history ==
Following the book's initial publication by Doubleday in 1954 it was subsequently published as follows:

- 1954 Heinemann, UK and Australia
- 1954 The Sydney Morning Herald, newspaper serialisation
- 1956 Pan Books, UK
- 1963 Berkeley Books, USA
- 1967 Heinemann, UK
- 1983 Charles Scribner's Sons, USA
- 1984 Pan Books, UK
- 1991 Angus and Robertson, Australia
- 1994 Angus and Robertson, Australia
- 1998 Duffy & Snellgrove, Australia

and subsequent paperback, ebook and audio book editions.

The novel was also translated into German in 1955, Spanish in 1956, Czech in 1965, French in 1991 and Vietnamese in 1998.

== Critical reception ==
A. R. McElwain, reviewing the novel for The Herald noted: "What fascinates me about Mr Upfield's new offering is not so much the case, sound as it is, but the amazingly realistic description of Lake Otway and what goes on around it—the ground heaving in the stifling heat and the 'prodigious struggle for survival' as millions of parched rabbits, kangaroos, foxes, dingoes and birds struggle frenziedly to reach what remains of the water while the lake is still in its death throes."

A reviewer in The Bulletin concurred, "the tendency of [Upfield's] backgrounds to take over the story has progressed to where the magnificence of the scene-painting completely overwhelms the detection."

== See also ==
- 1954 in Australian literature
