= 1937 in Australian literature =

This article presents a list of the historical events and publications of Australian literature during 1937.

== Books ==
- Martin Boyd – The Picnic
- Eleanor Dark – Sun Across the Sky
- M. Barnard Eldershaw – Plaque with Laurel
- Arthur Gask – Night of the Storm
- Ion Idriess – Forty Fathoms Deep
- Michael Innes – Hamlet, Revenge!
- Seaforth Mackenzie – The Young Desire It
- Leonard Mann – A Murder in Sydney
- Vance Palmer – Legend for Sanderson
- Katharine Susannah Prichard – Intimate Strangers
- Helen Simpson – Under Capricorn
- F. J. Thwaites – Rock End
- Arthur Upfield
  - Mr. Jelly's Business
  - Winds of Evil

== Poetry ==
- Rosemary Dobson – Poems
- Nora Kelly – The Song-Maker and Other Verse
- Jack Lindsay – "On Guard for Spain"
- John Shaw Neilson – "I Spoke to the Violet"

== Drama ==
=== Radio ===
- Vance Palmer
  - The Black Horse
  - Telling Mrs Baker

=== Theatre ===
- Sumner Locke Elliott
  - The Cow Jumped Over the Moon
  - Glorious Noon
- Miles Franklin – No Family
- T. Inglis Moore – Best Australian One-Act Plays complied with William Moore
- Katharine Susannah Prichard – Women of Spain

== Awards and honours ==
=== Literary ===
Award	Author	Title	Publisher
ALS Gold Medal	Seaforth Mackenzie	The Young Desire It	Jonathan Cape

== Births ==
A list, ordered by date of birth (and, if the date is either unspecified or repeated, ordered alphabetically by surname) of births in 1937 of Australian literary figures, authors of written works or literature-related individuals follows, including year of death.

- 19 February – Lee Harding, novelist (died 2023)
- 1 June – Colleen McCullough, novelist (died 2015)

== Deaths ==
A list, ordered by date of death (and, if the date is either unspecified or repeated, ordered alphabetically by surname) of deaths in 1937 of Australian literary figures, authors of written works or literature-related individuals follows, including year of birth.

- 15 March – Catherine Edith Macauley Martin, novelist (born 1848)
- 27 March – Ethel Castilla, journalist, poet and short story writer (born 1861)
- 9 April – Dorothy Frances McCrae, poet and short story writer (born 1879)

== See also ==
- 1937 in Australia
- 1937 in literature
- 1937 in poetry
- List of years in Australian literature
- List of years in literature
