= The Mystery of Swordfish Reef =

Novel by Australian writer Arthur Upfield

- Author: Arthur Upfield
- Language: English
- Series: Detective Inspector Napoleon 'Bony' Bonaparte
- Genre: Fiction
- Publisher: Angus & Robertson
- Publication date: 1939
- Publication place: Australia
- Media type: Print
- Pages: 256 pp
- Preceded by: The Bone is Pointed
- Followed by: Bushranger of the Skies

The Mystery of Swordfish Reef (1939) is a novel by Australian writer Arthur Upfield. It was the seventh of the author's novels to feature his recurring character Detective Inspector Napoleon 'Bony' Bonaparte. It was originally published in the Australia by Angus & Robertson in 1939.

== Abstract ==
A mystery surrounds the disappearance of a deep-sea fishing boat and its four crew on a perfectly calm day. Later, as part of its catch, a trawler recovers the skull of the man who rented the boat.

The plot is based on the 1880 disappearance of the geologist Lamont Young near Mystery Bay, New South Wales.

== Location ==
The action of the novel takes place at Bermagui, New South Wales; where the reef extends from Montague Island.

== Publishing history ==
Following the book's initial publication by Angus & Robertson in 1939 it was subsequently published as follows:

- McClelland and Stewart, Canada, 1943
- Doubleday Books, USA, 1943
- Heinemann, UK, 1960

and subsequent paperback, ebook and audio book editions.

== Critical reception ==
In The Herald the reviewer called the novel "an excellent yarn of its kind, in which Mr Upfield has turned to the big game fishing grounds off the south coast of New South Wales, which he knows so well...Bony is sent for. He unravels the mystery in his usual efficient fashion and gives Mr Upfield an opportunity to provide a novel and realistic background. His public should be well pleased with Swordfish Reef."

K. A. in The Argus noted: "Mr Upfield has the knack of telling a detective tale and we salute him again for showing us how to introduce a true Australian atmosphere in a way that enhances his reputation."

In The Bulletin the reviewer concluded that "the descriptive passages, especially those relating to the catching of swordfish, are very well done, and in bringing Bonaparte from his usual haunts in the interior of the continent to its seashore Upfield has produced a book worth reading for its freshness and vigor."

== Television adaptation ==
The novel was adapted for television in 1973 in a one-hour episode, titled "Boney and the Albatross", of the Boney series. It was directed by Peter Maxwell, from a script by Ross Napier.

== See also ==
- 1939 in Australian literature
