= Venom House =

1952 novel by Australian writer Arthur Upfield

- Author: Arthur Upfield
- Language: English
- Series: Detective Inspector Napoleon 'Bony' Bonaparte
- Genre: Fiction
- Publisher: Doubleday
- Publication date: 1952
- Publication place: Australia
- Media type: Print
- Pages: 184 pp
- Preceded by: The New Shoe
- Followed by: Murder Must Wait

Venom House (1952) is a novel by Australian writer Arthur Upfield. It is the sixteenth of the author's novels to feature his recurring character Detective Inspector Napoleon 'Bony' Bonaparte. It was originally published in USA by Doubleday in 1952 under their Crime Club imprint.

== Abstract ==
In Arthur Upfield's "Venom House adventure, he investigates murder in a Queensland pastoral family–an extraordinary family indeed, long-settled on the land they originally took by violence and pursued, it seems by some sort of curse."

== Location ==
The action of the novel is set in and around "Edison", the real-life Elston, on the swampy coast south of Brisbane. The name was later changed to Surfers Paradise.

== Publishing history ==
Following the book's initial publication by Doubleday in 1952 it was subsequently published as follows:

- 1952 Unicorn Mystery Club, USA (in an omnibus with Calendar of Crime by Ellery Queen, The Three Widows by Bernice Carey and The Intriguer by Maude Parker)
- 1953 Heinemann, UK and Australia
- 1964 Berkeley Books, USA
- 1969 Penguin, UK
- 1970 Heinemann, UK
- 1977 Pan Books, UK
- 1985 Angus and Robertson, Australia
- 1988 Eden Paperbacks, Australia
- 1988 Collier Books, USA
- 1994 Angus and Robertson, Australia

and subsequent paperback, ebook and audio book editions.

The novel was also translated into German in 1956.

== Critical reception ==
A reviewer in The News (Adelaide) noted: "Upfield specialises in suspense, and suspense is aided by the sombreness of the setting—a grim, stone house in the heart of a treacherous man-made swamp."

The Newcastle Morning Herald and Miners' Advocate found the book to be "not much more than an average thriller, but it still scores because of its background."

== Television adaptation ==
The novel was adapted for television in 1972 in a one-hour episode, titled "Boney in Venom House", of the Boney series. It was directed by Peter Maxwell, from a script by Tony Morphett.

== See also ==
- 1952 in Australian literature
