= The Bone is Pointed =

Novel by Australian writer Arthur Upfield

- Author: Arthur Upfield
- Language: English
- Series: Detective Inspector Napoleon 'Bony' Bonaparte
- Genre: Fiction
- Publisher: Angus & Robertson
- Publication date: 1938
- Publication place: Australia
- Media type: Print
- Pages: 319 pp
- Preceded by: Winds of Evil
- Followed by: The Mystery of Swordfish Reef

The Bone is Pointed (1938) is a novel by Australian writer Arthur Upfield. It was the sixth of the author's novels to feature his recurring character Detective Inspector Napoleon 'Bony' Bonaparte. It was originally published in the Australia by Angus & Robertson in 1938, and subsequently serialised in The Herald newspaper in Melbourne between September and November 1938, under the title Murder on the Station.

== Abstract ==
"'Jack Anderson was a big man with a foul temper, a sadist and a drunk. Five months after his horse appeared riderless, no trace of the man has surfaced and no one seems to care. But Bony is determined to follow the cold trail and smoke out some answers.' (Publication summary)"

== Location ==
The action of the novel takes place around "Opal Town" or Opalton, Queensland in the Channel Country of the Diamantina River.

== Publishing history ==
Following the book's initial publication by Angus & Robertson in 1938 it was subsequently published as follows:

- Saunders 1938, Canada
- John Hamilton 1939, UK
- Doubleday 1947, USA

and subsequent paperback, ebook and audio book editions.

== Critical reception ==
In The Herald the reviewer "Touchstone" stated: "Mr Upfield's latest novel will please, and surprise, all his readers. Considered solely as a mystery yarn, featuring that ingenious and original sleuth, Detective-Inspector Napoleon Bonaparte, it is one of the best things that he has written. But Mr Upfield has not been content with that alone. 'Bony's' investigations into the mysterious disappearance of Jeffery Handerson, of Karwin Station, are set against a vividly realised and well-described background of station and aboriginal life."

Habakkuk in The Australasian noted: "For my own part I freely admit that I have not enjoyed any other detective story I have read more than I enjoyed this book. It combines all the attributes necessary in a story of its type. Firstly, an excellent story. Secondly, a perfectly feasible plot, which is yet unusual enough in its workings to hold the interest hot to the last line. Thirdly, good character drawing. And, fourthly, scene and local colour that, apart altogether from the story itself, grip the imagination and hold the reader's unflagging attention. Mr. Upfleld is among the first flight of detective story writers, a peer of the Dorothy Sayers's and other leaders in this class of fiction."

== 1948 radio serial ==
The book was serialised for radio in 1941 and 1948.

== Television adaptation ==
The novel was adapted for television in 1973 in a one-hour episode, titled "Boney Walks with Death", of the Boney series. It was directed by Howard Rubie, from a script by Eric Paice.

== See also ==
- 1938 in Australian literature
