= An Author Bites the Dust =

1948 novel by Australian writer Arthur Upfield

- Author: Arthur Upfield
- Language: English
- Series: Detective Inspector Napoleon 'Bony' Bonaparte
- Genre: Fiction
- Publisher: Angus and Robertson
- Publication date: 1948
- Publication place: Australia
- Media type: Print
- Pages: 285 pp
- Preceded by: The Devil's Steps
- Followed by: The Mountains Have a Secret

An Author Bites the Dust (1948) is a novel by Australian writer Arthur Upfield. It is the eleventh of the author's novels to feature his recurring character Detective Inspector Napoleon 'Bony' Bonaparte. It was originally published in Australia by Angus and Robertson in 1948.

== Abstract ==
The author and critic Mervyn Blake is found dead in his writing room on his property about 30 miles from Melbourne. The cause of death is unknown. Two months after the death Boney is brought down to Melbourne to help solve the case.

== Location ==
The novel is set in the fictional town of Yarrabo, in the valley of the real Yarra River.

== Publishing history ==
Following the book's initial publication by Angus and Robertson in 1948 it was subsequently published as follows:

- Doubleday Books, USA, 1948
- Unicorn Mystery Book Club, USA, 1948
- Angus and Robertson, Australia, 1967

and subsequent paperback, ebook and audio book editions.

The novel was also translated into Spanish in 1956, German in 1957, and French in 2000.

== Critical reception ==
The reviewer in The Bulletin noted that with the victim and associates being members of Australian literary circles, this allowed Upfield to "write about Australian scenes and Australian literature. The former he does well, quietly, and warmly; although now and again there is an indication that he is not so much building up a familiar scene as explaining something to an overseas reader. But in writing about Australian literature Mr. Upfield is, at times, very unkind...Napoleon Bonaparte, Upfield's familiar half-caste inspector, is a synthetic figure: the usual efficient sleuth with endearing habits who baffles his orthodox colleagues, with a bit of 'blacktracking' thrown in for good measure."

In The Sydney Morning Herald the reviewer wrote: "Inspector Napoleon Bonaparte, B.A., is the only Australian detective in steady fictional employment. He has individual theories of crime, prides himself on his feminine intuition and his knowledge of psychology, but is modest regarding the singular powers of tracking inherited with his aboriginal blood". And concluded "In the details of detection, Bony shows his usual competence".

== See also ==
- 1948 in Australian literature
