= 1950 in Australian literature =

This article presents a list of the historical events and publications of Australian literature during 1950.

== Books ==
- James Aldridge – The Hunter
- Jon Cleary – Just Let Me Be
- Miles Franklin – Prelude to Waking
- Catherine Gaskin
  - All Else is Folly
  - Dust in the Sunlight
- Frank Hardy – Power Without Glory
- Ion Idriess – The Wild White Man of Badu
- Norman Lindsay – Dust or Polish?
- Philip Lindsay – There is No Escape
- David Martin – The Stones of Bombay
- Katharine Susannah Prichard – Winged Seeds
- Nevil Shute – A Town Like Alice
- F. J. Thwaites – Oasis of Shalimar
- E. V. Timms – The Beckoning Shore

== Short stories ==
- Nancy Cato – "The Trap"
- Alan Marshall – "Street Scene at Midday"
- John Morrison – "The Children"
- Dal Stivens – "The Batting Wizard from the City"
- Judah Waten
  - "Mother"
  - "Uncle Isaac"

== Children's and Young Adult fiction ==
- Ivan Southall – Meet Simon Black
- Ruth C. Williams – Verity of Sydney Town

== Crime and mystery ==
- Alec Coppel – Mr. Denning Drives North
- Arthur Upfield
  - The Bachelors of Broken Hill
  - The Widows of Broome

== Poetry ==
- David Campbell
  - "Ariel"
  - "Night Sowing"
  - "Who Points the Swallow"
- Nancy Cato
  - The Darkened Window : Poems
  - "Mallee Farmer"
- C.J. Dennis & Alec H. Chisholm – Selected Verse of C. J. Dennis
- Rosemary Dobson
  - "The Bystander"
  - "The Raising of the Dead"
- Dorothy Hewett
  - "Go Down Red Roses"
  - "In Midland Where the Trains Go By"
  - "Once I Rode With Clancy..."
- Jack Lindsay – Peace is Our Answer
- Vance Palmer & Margaret Sutherland – Old Australian Bush Ballads
- Roland Robinson
  - "The Coal"
  - "Deserted Homestead"
- Douglas Stewart – "Helmet Orchid"
- Francis Webb – "Morgan's Country"
- Judith Wright
  - "The Cedars"
  - "The Cicadas"
  - "Legend"
  - "To a Child"

== Drama ==
- Kylie Tennant – Tether a Dragon
- Musette Morell – Ten Puppet Plays

== Biography ==
- Don Bradman – Farewell to Cricket
- Nettie Palmer – Henry Handel Richardson : A Study

== Non-fiction ==
- Arthur Groom – I Saw A Strange Land: Journeys in Central Australia

== Awards and honours ==
=== Literary ===
Award	Author	Title	Publisher
ALS Gold Medal	Jon Cleary	Just Let Me Be	Werner Laurie

=== Children's and Young Adult ===
Award	Category	Author	Title	Publisher
Children's Book of the Year Award	Older Readers	Alan J. Villiers, illustrated by Charles Pont	Whalers of the Midnight Sun	Angus and Robertson

=== Poetry ===
Award	Author	Title	Publisher
Grace Leven Prize for Poetry	Not awarded		

== Births ==
A list, ordered by date of birth (and, if the date is either unspecified or repeated, ordered alphabetically by surname) of births in 1950 of Australian literary figures, authors of written works or literature-related individuals follows, including year of death.

- 15 January – Peter Pierce, academic, editor and critic (died 2018)
- 16 January – Brian Castro, novelist
- 24 March – Andrea Goldsmith, novelist
- 26 July – Terry Denton, children's writer and illustrator (died 2026)
- 8 August – Philip Salom, poet and novelist
- 1 September – John Forbes, poet (died 1998)
- 6 September – Robyn Davidson, travel writer
- 27 September – John Marsden, writer and teacher (died 2024)
- 14 October – Kate Grenville, novelist
- 25 November – Alexis Wright, novelist
- 12 December – Louis Nowra, playwright
- 22 December – Nick Enright, playwright (died 2003)

Unknown date

- Heather Goodall, historian (died 2026)
- Ian Irvine, novelist
- Andrew Sant, poet
- Carole Wilkinson, writer for children

== Deaths ==
A list, ordered by date of death (and, if the date is either unspecified or repeated, ordered alphabetically by surname) of deaths in 1950 of Australian literary figures, authors of written works or literature-related individuals follows, including year of birth.

- 10 August – Peter Airey, poet and politician (born 1865)
- 20 November – Erle Cox, novelist (born 1873)

== See also ==
- 1950 in Australia
- 1950 in literature
- 1950 in poetry
- List of years in Australian literature
- List of years in literature
