= The New Shoe =

1951 novel by Australian writer Arthur Upfield

- Author: Arthur Upfield
- Language: English
- Series: Detective Inspector Napoleon 'Bony' Bonaparte
- Genre: Fiction
- Publisher: Doubleday
- Publication date: 1951
- Publication place: Australia
- Media type: Print
- Pages: 189 pp
- Preceded by: The Bachelors of Broken Hill
- Followed by: Venom House

The New Shoe (1951) is a novel by Australian writer Arthur Upfield. It is the fifteenth of the author's novels to feature his recurring character Detective Inspector Napoleon 'Bony' Bonaparte. It was originally published in USA by Doubleday in 1951 under their Crime Club imprint.

The novel is also known under the titles Murder at Split Point and The Clue of the New Shoe.

== Abstract ==
The naked body of a man no-one can identify is found in the wall cavity of a lighthouse on the Victorian coast. With the help of a local dog Bony, who is on holiday in Victoria when he is called in to help, works to identify the man and his killer.

== Location ==
The action of the novel is set in and around Aireys Inlet; specifically, Split Point Lighthouse and Broken Rock.

== Publishing history ==
Following the book's initial publication by Doubleday in 1951 it was subsequently published as follows:

- 1952 Heinemann, UK and Australia
- 1953 Argus newspaper serialisation
- 1955 Pan Books, UK
- 1964 Berkeley Books, USA
- 1968 Heinemann, UK and Australia
- 1976 University of California, USA
- 1978 Pan Books, UK

and subsequent paperback, ebook and audio book editions.

The novel was also translated into German in 1961.

== Critical reception ==
In The Advertiser newspaper a reviewer was impressed with the work: "Mr. Upfield's local color is accurate and interesting, his characters seem alarmingly real, and his hero's detective ability — granting him the luck of the dog's discovery — is admirable."

Helen Frizzel, in The Australian Women's Weekly, called the novel "a well-stitched, craftsmanlike piece of work, guaranteed fit for an evening's light reading."

== Television adaptation ==
The novel was adapted for television in 1972 in a one-hour episode, titled "Boney Buys a Coffin", of the Boney series. It was directed by Peter Maxwell, from a script by Joy Cavill.

== See also ==
- 1951 in Australian literature
