= Boney (TV series) =

- Genre: Crime; Mystery; Detective
- Starring: James Laurenson; Nick Tate; Kate Fitzpatrick
- Country of origin: Australia
- Original language: English
- No. of series: 2
- No. of episodes: 26

Production
- Running time: 40 minutes
- Production company: Fauna Television

Original release
- Release: 1971 – 1972

Boney is an Australian television series produced by Fauna Productions during 1971 and 1972, featuring New Zealand actor James Laurenson in the title role of Detective Inspector Napoleon Bonaparte. Two series, each of thirteen episodes, were filmed. They were adapted from the twenty-nine novels by Arthur Upfield featuring his title character, published from 1929 to 1964.

The series is centred on Bonaparte, a highly educated, multiracial police inspector. His father was a white man and his mother was an Australian Aboriginal.

The casting of Laurenson, a white man who performed in dark make-up, was strongly criticised by the Australian Aboriginal community. They believed the part should have gone to an Aboriginal actor.

== Cast ==
=== Main/regular ===
- James Laurenson as Detective Inspector Bonaparte (Boney) (seasons 1 and 2)
- Kate Fitzpatrick as Constable Alice McGorr (season 2 only)

=== Guests (partial) ===
| Actor | Role | Tenure |
|---|---|---|
| Anne Haddy | Mary Parker / Mrs Cosgrove | 2 episodes |
| Ben Gabriel | Senior Constable Sassoon | 1 episode |
| Bindi Williams | Pintubi | 1 episode: "Boney and the Powder Trail" |
| Brian Moll | Bill Bulford | 1 episode |
| Brian Wenzel | Sergeant Cox | 2 episodes |
| Bruce Barry | Bull Johnson | 1 episode |
| Bruce Spence | Sawyer's Ron | 1 episode |
| Charles "Bud" Tingwell | Jeff Stanton | 1 episode: "Boney and the Powder Trail" |
| Cornelia Frances | Stella Borredale | 1 episode |
| Danny Adcock | Tony Carr | 1 episode |
| David Gulpilil | Black Boy / Balinga / Dancer / Tonto /David Ooldea (plus featured dancer in opening & closing sequences) | 4 episodes |
| Deryck Barnes | Sgt Colin Harvey | 1 episode: "Boney Walks with Death" |
| Diane Craig | Marion | 1 episode: "Boney and the Powder Trail" |
| Diana McLean | Jessica Menzies | 1 episode |
| Enid Lorimer | Mrs Thompson | 1 episode |
| Frank Gallacher | Barman | 1 episode |
| Googie Withers | Mrs Loftus / Diana Thompson | 3 episodes: "Boney and the Reaper", "Boney Hunts a Murderess"& "Boney and the Paroo Bikeman" |
| Gus Mercurio | Frail | 1 episode |
| Harold Hopkins | Jack Wilton | 1 episode |
| Honor Blackman | Mary Answorth | 1 episode: "Boney in Venom House" |
| Jack Thompson | Jack / Red Kelly | 2 episodes: "Boney and the Kelly Gang", "Boney and the Strangler" |
| Jeanie Drynan | Isobel Matthews / Sally Forrest | 2 episodes |
| John Orcsik | Greg Pampino | 1 episode |
| John Waters | Constable Peter Lloyd | 1 episode |
| Judy Lynne | Carol Lund | 1 episode |
| Judy Morris | Jill Madden / Kathy Markham | 2 episodes |
| June Salter | Mrs Larkins | 1 episode |
| Kate Sheil | Gloria Lacey | 1 episode |
| Ken Goodlet | Inspector Walters / Lively Early / Sergeant Bob Edwards | 3 episodes |
| Ken Shorter | Vic Vickery | 1 episode |
| Ken Wayne | Charlie | 1 episode |
| Kerry McGuire | Meena | 1 episode |
| Kevin Miles | Martin Borredale | 1 episode |
| Les Foxcroft | Yorky | 1 episode |
| Lesley Baker | Boarding House Lady | 1 episode |
| Maggie Dence | Mrs. Coutts | 1 episode: "Boney and the Emu Man" |
| Mark Lee | Dave O’Dwyer | 1 episode |
| Max Cullen | Glen Shannon | 1 episode |
| Max Osbiston | McDonald Snr | 1 episode |
| Max Phipps | Morris Answorth | 1 episode: "Boney in Venom House" |
| Michael Long | Martin Miller | 1 episode: "Boney and the White Savage" |
| Neva Carr Glyn | Mrs Conway | 1 episode |
| Nick Tate | Sergeant Peter Irwin | 2 episodes |
| Noeline Brown | Mrs Sawyer | 1 episode |
| Olivia Hamnett | Diana Rockwell | 1 episode |
| Owen Weingott | Bill Newton | 1 episode |
| Penne Hackforth-Jones | Eve | 1 episode |
| Peter Gwynne | Tim Thursley | 1 episode |
| Peter Sumner | Sergeant Peter Fuller | 1 episode |
| Reg Gorman | Bray | 1 episode |
| Rod Mullinar | Frank Abbott | 1 episode |
| Roger Ward | Constable Barnard | 1 episode |
| Ron Graham | Mark Taylor | 1 episode |
| Ron Haddrick | Leonard Jelly | 1 episode |
| Rowena Wallace | Kat Loader | 1 episode |
| Ruth Cracknell | Elizabeth Campbell | 1 episode |
| Serge Lazareff | Greg Green / Dick Lake | 2 episodes |
| Terry McDermott | Jim Oliver | 1 episode |
| Tony Ward | Bill Nettlefold | 1 episode |

== Production ==
Australian TV audiences were introduced to Detective Inspector Napoleon Bonaparte in 1972. "Boney" (spelled "Bony" in the books) had an Aboriginal mother and a white father. He tracked murderers by spotting an overturned twig or a crushed ant on the sand. A loner who never failed to crack a case, he was impatient with authority, charming, arrogant and an expert burglar, moving in a world of sunbaked claypans and the most distant reaches of the Outback, where only the Aboriginal people could survive.

Arthur Upfield described his character as having been found as a baby near the body of his Aboriginal mother. (She was killed because of her forbidden relationship with a white man). The infant boy orphan was taken to a mission station. He was named Napoleon Bonaparte (nicknamed Boney, or Bony as it was later spelled). He was educated and grew up to become a police detective specializing in murder cases.

=== Development ===
During 1963, British film director Michael Powell first visited Australia to preproduce his film, They're A Weird Mob. There he met actor and theatre businessman John McCallum and Bob Austin (a legal expert), who used their local knowledge to gain financing from Australian backers. The film did well.

Three years later the trio bought the film and television rights to the Bony detective novels. A script written for Paramount Pictures failed to secure a deal, and Powell moved on to other projects.

By 1970, John McCallum, Bob Austin, and veteran Australian producer Lee Robinson had set up Fauna Productions. Having made their reputation with the children's TV series Skippy the Bush Kangaroo and Barrier Reef, and the feature film Nickel Queen, they found finance to make a series titled Bonaparte. They engaged various international sources (American investors had shown enthusiasm, but pulled out when the producers refused their demand that Bony be reframed as white rather than multiracial).

The producers decided to shoot the stories in contemporary Australia. English playwright and scriptwriter Eric Paice flew there to head the writing team. Signed up to direct alternate episodes were Peter Maxwell and Eric Fullilove. The team began casting for Upfield's half-Aboriginal hero and other characters.

=== Casting ===
According to John McCallum:

"We looked all over Australia! Ideally, of course, the part should have been played by a half-Aborigine, and we saw hundreds of people, but it needed someone with very considerable acting experience and expertise. We auditioned white actors in every state, but there was no-one with the right physiognomy and characteristics for the part..."

Aboriginal groups felt that black actors were being discriminated against, and publicly denounced Fauna.

English actor Jon Finch was eventually signed, but he pulled out two weeks before shooting began. McCallum flew to London to conduct more casting interviews. He saw more than eighty actors, and just about to phone home and postpone production, when James Laurenson, an actor from New Zealand arrived. McCallum knew he'd found Bony, although he insisted that Laurenson wear dark make-up for the part.

In 2010, notable Aboriginal actor Jack Charles recounted that, when he auditioned for the role in 1972, the producer told him they were looking for an actor with blue eyes.

Laurenson's casting was immediately criticised. He said in a 1972 interview:

"I think any actor, black or white or yellow, has the right to play any part... I can understand their grievances but the company searched long and hard for an aboriginal Boney. They felt they couldn't come up with anyone who could sustain a six days a week schedule. You do need a certain amount of experience to stay alive".

Bob Maza said, "I could have guaranteed John McCallum ten articulate, sophisticated black people to play that part. He didn't look very hard. Did he look at all?"

Upfield had told McCallum that he'd always intended to call his detective "Boney", but a printer's error had changed it to "Bony". His preferred spelling replaced "Bonaparte" as the title of the series.

The crew flew to Alice Springs during July 1971 to film the first episode, "Boney Buys A Woman". Twelve-hour six-day working weeks bonded the producers, cast and crew. As John McCallum recalled:

"It wasn't an easy series to shoot. The long lines of communication to Sydney added to our difficulties and costs. Rushes took days, sometimes weeks to get to us. The heat was appalling for most of the time and the flies worse. But we had a splendid crew who would work in the blazing sun or the pouring rain... they complained, of course, but they did it!"

After the first series was well received in Australia and internationally, a further thirteen episodes were filmed. The second series co-starred Kate Fitzpatrick as Boney's assistant, Constable Alice McGorr. The second season started filming in July 1972.

John McCallum said that "James gave an excellent performance. He looked right and he sounded right, and I think Arthur Upfield would have been very pleased with him".

== Reception ==
Although Upfield's novels featuring Bony were more popular in the United States than Australia, the series was not shown in the US. According to John McCallum, several attempts to sell the series to distributors in the US were rejected as the Americans could not accept that a police detective, along with most of the criminals he hunted, did not use firearms.

Although the producers were interested in producing a third series, James Laurenson was reluctant due to the continuing criticism of his having been cast in the role.

Reviewing Boney and the Black Opal, The Age said Laurenson's "talent is wrapped in a tall frame and dark, rugged good looks that should make him Australia's newest TV sex symbol".

Valda Marshall of the Sydney Morning Herald said Laurenson was "superb... I predict Laurenson will have half the women of Australia drooling over their sets. He turns in an extraordinary performance, with not even a drop of Maori blood, he looks completely the part of the half-caste Aboriginal detective".

== 1990s series ==
In 1992, a series entitled Bony was shown in Australia. Its thirteen episodes were produced by Grundy, a company known for packaging quiz show formats and producing soap operas. Starring 26-year-old actor and singer Cameron Daddo, the Bony pilot film was about Inspector Bonaparte’s grandson David, who also became a police detective.

Reacting to complaints from Aboriginal viewers, in the resulting series the producers changed Daddo to a white policeman who had been brought up and schooled by Australian Aboriginals. He had an elderly black mentor, his uncle (played by Burnum Burnum). With partial funding by the West German broadcaster ZDF, which had put money into the 1971/2 series, the producers had bought the name Bony. Otherwise the series did not draw from either the Upfield books nor the earlier Fauna series.

== In popular culture ==
Record producer Frank Farian named the 1970s disco group Boney M. after the character of the first two series.
