= Arthur Upfield =

Writer best known for Australian detective fiction

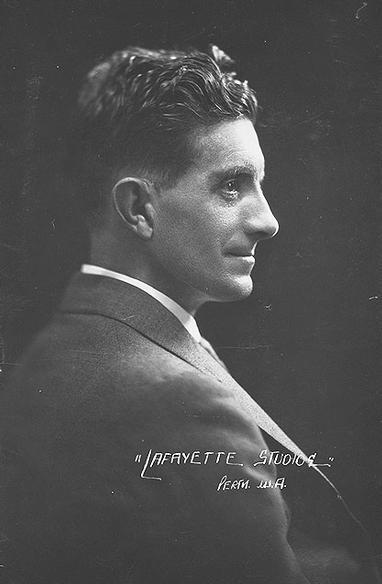
- Born: Arthur William Upfield; 1 September 1890; Gosport, Hampshire, England
- Died: 12 February 1964 (aged 73); Bowral, New South Wales
- Occupation: Novelist
- Spouse: Ann Douglass
- Writing career
- Genre: Detective fiction
- Notable work: The Sands of Windee (1931)

Arthur William Upfield (1 September 1890 – 12 February 1964) was an English-Australian writer, best known for his works of detective fiction featuring Detective Inspector Napoleon "Bony" Bonaparte of the Queensland Police Force, a mixed-race Indigenous Australian. His books were the basis for a 1970s Australian television series entitled Boney, as well as a 1990 telemovie and a 1992 spin-off TV series.

Born in England, Upfield moved to Australia in 1911 and fought for the Australian military during the First World War. Following his war service, he travelled extensively throughout Australia, obtaining a knowledge of Australian Aboriginal culture that he would later use in his written works. In addition to writing detective fiction, Upfield was a member of the Australian Geological Society and was involved in numerous scientific expeditions.

In The Sands of Windee, a story about a "perfect murder", Upfield invented a method to destroy carefully all evidence of the crime. Upfield's "Windee method" was used in the Murchison Murders, and because Upfield had discussed the plot with friends, including the man accused of the murders, he was called to give evidence in court. The episode is dramatised in the film 3 Acts of Murder, starring Robert Menzies.

== Early life ==
The son of a draper, Upfield was born in Gosport, Hampshire, England, on 1 September 1890. In 1911, after he did poorly in examinations towards becoming a real estate agent, Upfield's father sent him to Australia.

With the outbreak of the First World War in the summer of 1914, he joined the First Australian Imperial Force on 23 August 1914. He sailed from Brisbane on 24 September 1914 to Melbourne. At the time of sailing he had the rank of Driver and was with the Australian 1st Light Horse Brigade Train (5 Company ASC [Army Service Corps]). In Melbourne he was at a camp for several weeks before sailing to Egypt. He fought at Gallipoli and in France and married an Australian nurse, Ann Douglass, in Egypt in 1915. He was discharged in England on 15 October 1919. Before returning to Australia, Ann gave birth to their only child, James Arthur, born 8 February 1920.

For most of the next 20 years he travelled throughout the outback, working at a number of jobs and learning about Aboriginal cultures. A contributor of an article 'Coming Down with Cattle' to the first edition of Walkabout magazine, he later used the knowledge and material he had gathered in his books.

== Career ==
Upfield created the character of Detective Inspector Napoleon Bonaparte, based on a man known as "Tracker Leon", whom he said he had met in his travels. Leon was supposedly a half-caste employed as a tracker by the Queensland Police. He was also said to have read Shakespeare and a biography of Napoleon, and to have received a university education. However, there is no evidence that any such person ever existed. The novels featuring Bony, as the detective was also known, were far more successful than any other writings by Upfield.

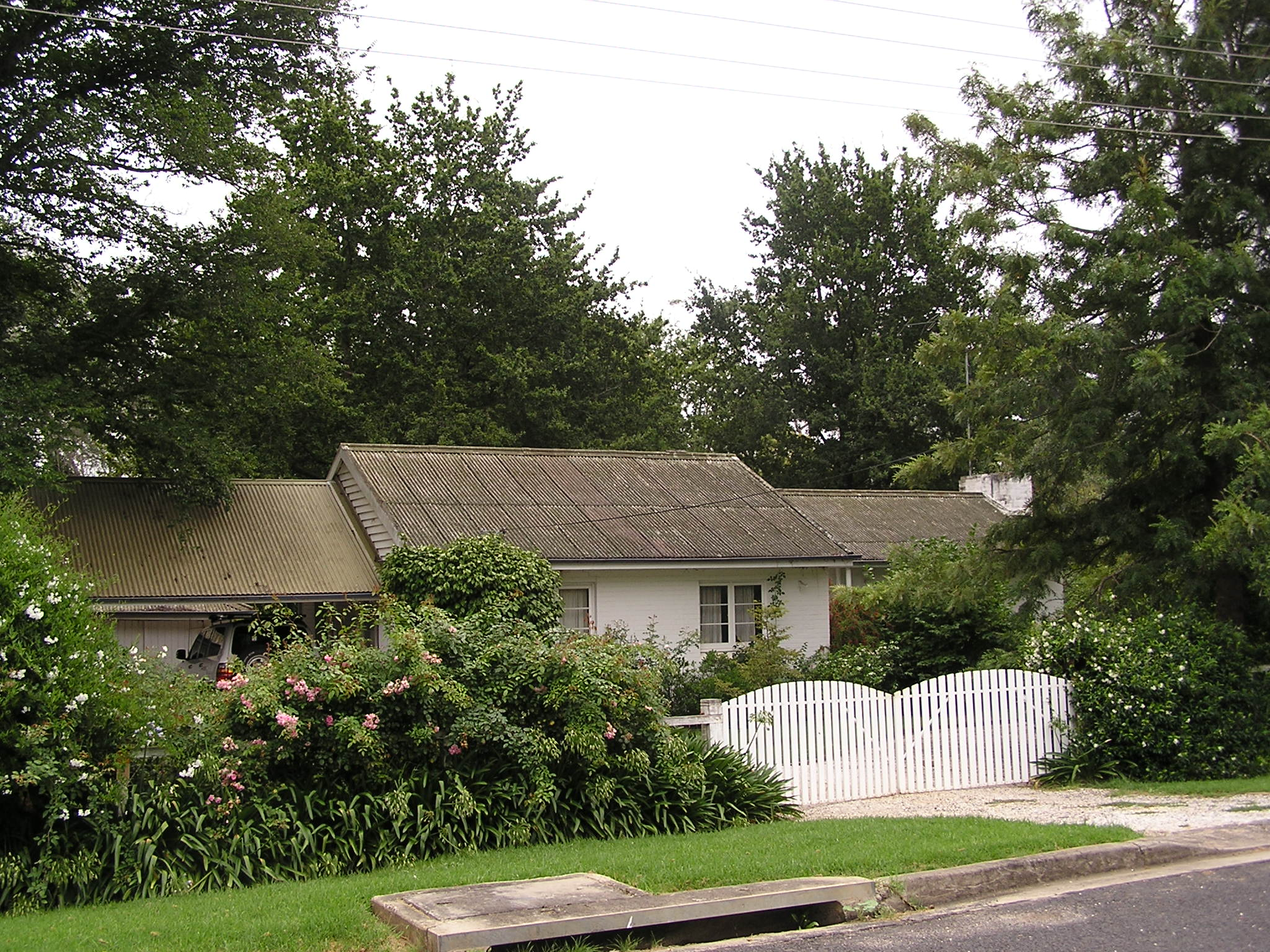
3 Jasmine Street, Bowral, the house where Upfield spent his last years and died

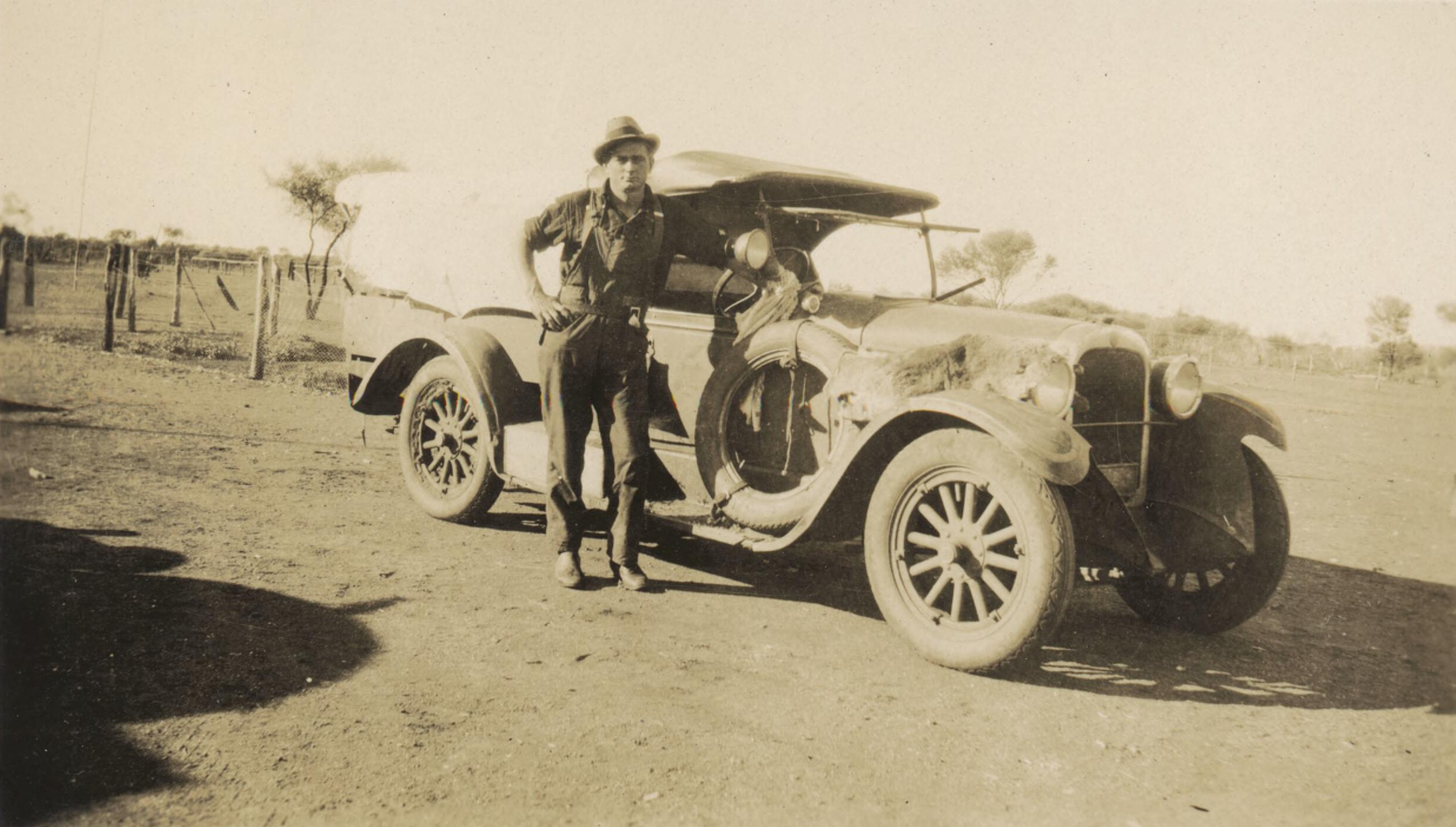
Snowy Rowles, convicted of the Murchison Murders, standing beside the car of James Ryan, photographed by Arthur Upfield. Ryan was one of the victims.

Late in life Upfield became a member of the Australian Geological Society, involved in scientific expeditions. He led a major expedition in 1948 to northern and western parts of Australia, including the Wolfe Creek Crater, which was a setting for his novel The Will of the Tribe published in 1962.

After living at Bermagui, New South Wales, Upfield moved to Bowral. Upfield died at Bowral on 12 February 1964. His last work, The Lake Frome Monster, published in 1966, was completed by J.L. Price and Dorothy Stange.

In 1957, Jessica Hawke published a biography of the author entitled Follow My Dust!. It is generally held, however, that this was written by Upfield himself.

== Works ==
Upfield's novels were held in high regard by some fellow writers. In 1987, H. R. F. Keating included The Sands of Windee in his list of the 100 best crime and mystery books ever published. J. B. Priestley wrote of Upfield: "If you like detective stories that are something more than puzzles, that have solid characters and backgrounds, that avoid familiar patterns of crime and detection, then Mr Upfield is your man." His grandson, William Arthur Upfield holds his grandfather's copyright, and the trademark 'Bony', keeping the works in print.

The American mystery novelist Tony Hillerman praised Upfield's works. In his introduction to the posthumous 1984 reprint of Upfield's A Royal Abduction, he described the seduction in his youth of Upfield's descriptions of both the harsh outback areas, and "the people who somehow survived upon them ... When my own Jim Chee of the Navaho Tribal Police unravels a mystery because he understands the ways of his people, when he reads the signs in the sandy bottom of a reservation arroyo, he is walking in the tracks Bony made 50 years ago."

His Bony books were translated into German for the Goldmanns Taschenkrimi Series in the late 1950s and early 1960s. They were widely read and quite successful.

== Books ==
Title of book	Setting	Publication
The House of Cain	Melbourne and NE of South Australia	Serialised: Perth Sunday Times (1928) Hutchinson, London, n.d. [1928]; 1st US Edition: Dorrance, Philadelphia, 1929; 2nd US Edition: (pirated) Dennis McMillan, San Francisco, 1983.
The Barrakee Mystery	Near Wilcannia, New South Wales First book to feature Detective Inspector Napoleon Bonaparte	Serialised: Melbourne Herald (1932) Hutchinson, London, n.d. [1929]; 2nd UK Edition: Heinemann, London, 1965; 1st US Edition: Doubleday/Crime Club, New York, 1965 – as The Lure of the Bush.
The Beach of Atonement	Dongara, Western Australia	Hutchinson, London, n.d. [1930].
The Sands of Windee	'Windee' is a fictional sheep station near Milparinka, a 150 miles (240 km) north of Broken Hill. Windee covered 1,300,000 acres (5,300 km^{2}) of land and ran 70 000 sheep.	Hutchinson, London, n.d. [1931]; 1st Australian Edition: Angus & Robertson, Sydney, 1958; 2nd UK Edition: Angus & Robertson, London, 1959.
A Royal Abduction	Cook and Eucla, on the Nullarbor Plain	Serialised: Melbourne Herald (1932) Hutchinson, London, [1932]; 1st US Edition: (pirated) Dennis McMillan, Miami Beach, 1984.
Gripped by Drought	The fictional Atlas Station near Pooncarie, NSW	Hutchinson, London, n.d. [1932]
The Murchison Murders	Upfield's own account of the murders in the Murchison region	Midget Masterpiece Publishing, Sydney, n.d. [1934]; 1st US Edition: (pirated) Dennis McMillan, Miami Beach, 1987.
Wings Above the Diamantina	In the region of the Diamantina River, which flows from Western Queensland into northern South Australia	Angus & Robertson, Sydney, 1936; 2nd Australian edition Angus & Robertson, Sydney, 1940 1st UK Edition: Hamilton, London, n.d. [1937] – as Winged Mystery 1st US Edition: Doubleday/Crime Club, New York, 1943 – as Wings Above the Claypan. Serialised in Australian newspapers as When Wings are Clipped (1935).
Mr. Jelly's Business	Takes place at Burracoppin and Merredin east of Perth in the Wheat Belt of Western Australia along the rabbit-proof fence. The railway station in the story map and the water pipe have changed little since Upfield's day (he worked clearing brush in Burracoppin).	Angus & Robertson, Sydney, 1937; 2nd Australian Edition: Angus & Robertson, Sydney, 1964 1st UK Edition: Hamilton, London, 1938 1st US Edition: Doubleday/Crime Club, New York, 1943 – as Murder Down Under.
Winds of Evil	Silverton, New South Wales, and the nearby Barrier Range, which is north and east of Broken Hill	Angus & Robertson, Sydney, 1937; 2nd Australian Edition: Angus & Robertson, Sydney, 1961 1st UK Edition Hutchinson, London, n.d. [1939] 1st US Edition: Doubleday/Crime Club, New York, 1944
The Bone is Pointed	"Opal Town" or Opalton, Queensland, in the Channel Country of the Diamantina River	Angus & Robertson, Sydney, 1938; 2nd Australian Edition: Angus & Robertson, Sydney, 1966 1st UK Edition: Hamilton, London, 1939 1st US Edition: Doubleday/Crime Club, New York, 1947; US Book Club Edition: Unicorn Mystery Book Club, New York, 1946. Serialised in Australian newspapers as Murder on the Station (1938).
The Mystery of Swordfish Reef	Takes place from Bermagui, New South Wales; the reef extends from Montague Island. The plot is based on the 1880 disappearance of the geologist Lamont Young near Mystery Bay, New South Wales.	Angus & Robertson, Sydney, 1939; Aust. Book Club Edition:Readers Book Club, Melbourne, 1963 1st UK Edition: Heinemann, London, 1960; UK Book Club Edition: The Companion Book Club, London, 1963; 2nd UK Edition: Heinemann, London, 1971 1st US Edition: Doubleday/Crime Club, New York, 1943
Bushranger of the Skies	"McPherson's Station", 80 miles northwest of Shaw's Lagoon, South Australia.	Angus & Robertson, Sydney, 1940; 2nd Australian Edition: Angus & Robertson, Sydney, 1963 1st US Edition: Doubleday/Crime Book Club, New York, 1944 – as No Footprints in the Bush
Death of a Swagman	Walls of China now in Mungo National Park, north-east of Buronga, far south-western NSW	1st Australian Edition: Angus & Robertson, Sydney, 1947; 2nd Australian Edition: Angus & Robertson, Sydney, 1962 1st UK Edition: Aldor, London, 1946 Doubleday/Crime Book Club, New York, 1945; US Book Club Edition: Unicorn Mystery Book Club, New York, 1946
The Devil's Steps	Set in a fictional mountain resort called Mount Chalmers, similar to the Dandenong Ranges on the eastern edge of Melbourne, Victoria (most probably in the vicinity of Mt Dandenong, but with some similarities to One Tree Hill in Ferny Creek), and also in Melbourne City and its suburbs South Yarra and Coburg.	1st Australian Edition: Invincible Press, Sydney, n.d. [1950–1953]; 2nd Australian Edition: Angus & Robertson, Sydney, 1965 1st UK Edition: Aldor, London, 1948 Doubleday/Crime Club, New York, 1946; US Book Club Edition: Unicorn Mystery Book Club, New York, 1946
An Author Bites the Dust	Set in the fictional town of Yarrabo, in the valley of the real Yarra River.	Angus & Robertson, Sydney, 1948 1st US Edition: Doubleday/Crime Club, New York, 1948; US Book Club Edition: Unicorn Mystery Book Club, New York, 1948
The Mountains Have a Secret	Set mostly in the Grampians mountain range in western Victoria.	1st UK Edition: Heinemann, London, 1952; 2nd UK Edition: Heinemann, London, (date not identified) Doubleday/Crime Club, New York, 1948; US Book Club Edition: Unicorn Mystery Book Club, New York, 1948
The Widows of Broome	Set in Broome, Western Australia	1st UK Edition: Heinemann, London, 1951; 2nd UK Edition: Heinemann, London, 1967 Doubleday/Crime Club, New York, 1950; US Book Club Edition: Dollar Mystery Guild, New York, 1950
The Bachelors of Broken Hill	Broken Hill, New South Wales	1st Australian Edition: Invincible Press, Sydney, between 1950 and 1953 1st UK Edition: Heinemann, London, 1958; 2nd UK Edition: Heinemann, London, (date not identified); Large Print Edition: Ulverscroft, Leicester, 1974 Doubleday/Crime Club, New York, 1950; US Book Club Edition: Detective Book Club, New York, 1951
The New Shoe	Aireys Inlet; specifically, Split Point Lighthouse and Broken Rock	1st UK Edition: Heinemann, London, 1952; 2nd UK Edition: Heinemann, London, 1968 Doubleday/Crime Book Club, New York, 1951
Venom House	Set in and around "Edison", the real-life Elston, on the swampy coast south of Brisbane.(The name was later changed as Surfers Paradise) long before it became a tourist resort.	1st UK Edition: Heinemann, London, 1953; 2nd UK Edition: Heinemann, London, 1970 Doubleday/Crime Club, New York, 1952; US Book Club Edition: Unicorn Mystery Club, New York, 1952
Murder Must Wait	"Mitford", New South Wales, which is approximately where real-life Wentworth is located. Various references indicate far west of New South Wales.	1st UK Edition: Heinemann, London, 1953; 2nd UK Edition: Heinemann, London, (date not identified) Doubleday/Crime Club, New York, 1953; US Book Club Edition: Detective Book Club, New York, 1953
Death of a Lake	East of Menindee. Said to be Lake Otway, an ephemeral lake that fills occasionally in massive River Darling floods.	Heinemann, London, 1954 1st US Edition: Doubleday/Crime Club, New York, 1954
Cake in the Hat Box; also published as Sinister Stones	Kimberley region of Western Australia "Agar's Lagoon" is Hall's Creek.	1st UK Edition: Heinemann, London, 1955; 2nd UK Edition: Heinemann, London, (date not identified) Doubleday/Crime Club, New York, 1954 as Sinister Stones
The Battling Prophet	The Cowdry River, a fictional river south of Mount Gambier.	Heinemann, London, 1956; 2nd UK Edition: Heinemann, London, (date not identified)
The Man of Two Tribes	Nullarbor Plain	1st UK Edition: Heinemann, London, 1956 – as Man of Two Tribes; 2nd UK Edition: Heinemann, London, (date not identified) Doubleday/Crime Club, New York, 1956
Bony Buys a Woman; also published as The Bushman Who Came Back	Lake Eyre region	1st UK Edition: Heinemann, London, 1957 Doubleday/Crime Club, New York, 1957 - as The Bushman Who Came Back
Follow My Dust!		Heinemann, London, 1957
Bony and the Black Virgin; also published as The Torn Branch	"Lake Jane", a fictional lake in the Murray–Darling Basin	1st UK Edition: Heinemann, London, 1959; 2nd UK Edition: Heinemann, London, (date not identified)
Bony and the Mouse; also published as Journey to the Hangman	"Daybreak", a fictional mining town 150 miles (240 km) from Laverton, Western Australia	1st UK Edition: Heinemann, London, 1959 – as Bony and the Mouse; 2nd UK Edition: Heinemann, London, (date not identified) Doubleday/Crime Club, New York. 1959 as Journey to the Hangman
Bony and the Kelly Gang; also published as Valley of Smugglers	Possibly set in a town and valley similar to Kangaroo Valley, New South Wales, not far from Bowral where Upfield lived for the last years of his life. However, Robertson on the top of the escarpment, which is known for its potatoes, is also possible. The waterfall may be Fitzroy Falls in Morton National Park. Narrates some episodes of the Ned Kelly true history.	1st UK Edition: Heinemann, London, 1960; 2nd UK Edition: Heinemann, London, (date not identified) Doubleday/Crime Club, New York, 1960; US Book Club Edition: Detective Book Club, New York, n.d. [1960] – as Valley of the Smugglers
The White Savage	Timbertown is a light disguise of Pemberton, a timber town in the south-west of Western Australia.	1st UK Edition: Heinemann, London, 1961 – as Bony and the White Savage; 2nd UK Edition: Heinemann, London, (date not identified) Doubleday/Crime Club, New York, 1961
The Will of the Tribe	Wolfe Creek Crater	First UK Edition: Heinemann, London, 1962 Doubleday/Crime Club, New York, 1962
Madman's Bend	Hard to tell along which stretch of the Darling River this was. Upfield spent time around Menindee where some large, dense, river redgum forests fit the bill that are within Kinchega National Park. A section of river near here is called Lunatic Bend just south of the township.	Heinemann, London, 1963 1st US Edition: Doubleday/Crime Club, New York, 1963 – as The Body at Madman's Bend
The Lake Frome Monster [Note: This posthumously published work was based on an unfinished manuscript and detailed notes left by Upfield. It was completed by J L Price and Mrs Dorothy Strange.]	Lake Frome, South Australia	Heinemann, London, 1966; 2nd UK Edition: Heinemann, London, (date not identified)
Breakaway House		Serialised: Perth Daily News (1932) Angus & Robertson, Sydney, 1987
The Great Melbourne Cup Mystery		Serialised: Melbourne Herald (1933) ETT Imprint, Watson's Bay, Sydney, 1996
The Gifts of Frank Cobbold		The Cobbold Family History Trust, written in 1935 and expanded from a short story ‘The Mysterious Notes’, published anonymously in the Fitzroy City Press on 23 May 1914; the manuscript was edited and revised by Sandra Berry in 2008

== Radio ==
Wings Above the Diamantina was adapted for radio in 1939 starring Ron Randell as Boney.

The Bone is Pointed was serialised in 1948.

There was a radio series in the 1950s Man of Two Tribes starring Frank Thring as Boney.

Novels would be read out in serial form on the radio, including:

- Bushranger of the Air (1940)
- The Cat in the Hat Box (1955)
- The Battling Prophet (1956)
- The Sands of Windee (1959)

== Television series ==
From 1972 to 1973, Fauna Productions produced a 26-episode television series based on the books. Detective Inspector Napoleon Bonaparte was played by New Zealand actor James Laurenson. The series was called Boney. Most of the episodes were based directly on one of the novels, but there were some adaptations. Two original scripts were not directly based on any novel; five novels were not adapted for television, effectively "reserving" them in case a third series was produced. At the time, many of the books were reprinted with the spelling altered to "Boney" on the covers (although retaining the original in the text), and featuring a photo from the relevant episode.

Bony was also a 1990 telemovie and later a 1992 spin-off TV series (using the original "Bony" spelling). However, the series was criticised for casting Bony as a white man (played by Cameron Daddo), under the tutelage of "Uncle Albert", an elderly Aboriginal man played by Burnum Burnum.

== Short stories ==
- His Last Holiday. Brisbane Daily Standard, 14 January 1916
- The Man Who Liked Work. Life, January 1928
- Laffer's Gold. Western Mail, 22 December 1932
- Rainbow Gold. Perth Sunday Times, 29 January 1933
- [Title Unknown]. Jarrah Leaves, 30 November 1933
- [Title Unknown]. Australian Journal, January 1934
- [Title Unknown]. Australian Journal, October 1935
- Henry's Last Job. Melbourne Herald, 14 February 1939
- A Mover of Mountains. Melbourne Herald, 14 October 1939
- Henry's Little Lamb. Melbourne Herald, 5 December 1939
- Joseph Henry's Christmas Party. Melbourne Herald, 23 December 1939
- Pinky Dick's Elixir. Melbourne Herald, 18 January 1940
- Vital Clue. Melbourne Herald, 19 January 1940
- Why Did the Devil Shoot a Pig?. Melbourne Herald, 29 January 1940
- That Cow Maggie!! Melbourne Herald, 11 April 1940
- The Great Rabbit Lure. Melbourne Herald, 19 April 1940
- The Colonel's Horse. ABC Weekly, 5 January 1941
- The Cairo Spy. ABC Weekly, 5 July 1941
- Through Flood and Desert for Twopence. ABC Weekly, 26 October 1941
- White Quartz. Adelaide Chronicle, 21 November 1946
- M-U-R-D-E-R at Split Point. Melbourne Argus, 27 December 1952 to 2 January 1953. (Heavily edited version of The New Shoe)

== Non-fiction ==
- All Must Pay: Reflections on Outpost. Melbourne Argus, 8 January 1916
- Little Stories of Gallipoli. Melbourne Argus, 10, 14, 19 and 21 January 1916
- The Blight. Barrier Miner, 4, 11, 18 and 25 October 1924
- ’’At School Today and Forty Years Ago’’. West Australian, 10 March 1928
- ’’The Loneliest Job on Earth’’. Wide World Magazine, December 1928
- Reynard the Killer: A Growing Menace to Pastoralists: Bush Life Becoming Extinct. Perth Sunday Times, 31 August 1930
- Aboriginal Philosophy. West Australian, 20 September 1930
- Face and Clothes. West Australian, 22 November 1930
- ’’Eucla - An Abandoned Township and it’s Ghost’’. Empire Review, December 1930
- Sep-Ah-Rate. West Australian, 17 October 1931
- Some Reflections on a Hilltop: The Charm of the Ranges: A Nomad's Heart Responds. Perth Daily News, 9 July 1932
- Lords of the Track: Sundowners I Have Met: Nicknames and Fads. Perth Daily News, 30 July 1932
- After Rain: Charms of Hill and Gully: The Song of the Brook Perth Daily News, 6 August 1932
- Street Mysteries: Sidelights in the Study of Humanity. Perth Sunday Times, 18 September 1932
- The Hunted Emu: A Rural Pest Which Is a Pest Destroyer. Perth Sunday Times, 13 November 1932
- Kangaroo Coursing: The Thrill of a Blind Chase. West Australian, 19 November 1932
- Christmas Memories. Perth Daily News, 24 December 1932
- Plagues of Australia: Wonders of Animal Migration. West Australian, 31 December 1932
- Literary Illusions: Some Experiences of an Author - and Others. Perth Sunday Times, 1 January 1933
- Way for the Pioneers! Migration Needs a New Deal. Melbourne Herald, 3 January 1933
- Australia. West Australian, 14 January 1933
- Let Us Go Beachcombing: The Perfect Dream for Hot Weather Days. Perth Daily News, 9 February 1933
- The Man Who Thought He Was Dead. Melbourne Herald, 28 October 1933
- Future of the Aborigines: New Protective Laws Required. Perth Daily News, 2 November 1933
- Found - An Old Tyre! A Problem of the Bush. Melbourne Herald, 11 November 1933
- Lonely Terrors of the Bush! The Man Who Lost Count! Melbourne Herald, 25 November 1933
- Untitled article. Brisbane Sunday Mail, 26 November 1933
- Justice for the Black. Try New Treatment! Melbourne Herald, 1 December 1933
- Land of Illusions: Do We Expect Too Much from the Northern Territory: Dangers of Boosting. Melbourne Herald, 19 December 1933
- My Life Outback: Surveyor, Cook and Raw Boundary Rider: The Breaking-in Begins. Melbourne Herald, 12 January 1934
- Poison! Tales of the Nonchalant Bush. Melbourne Herald, 13 January 1934
- Outback Adventures of a 'New Chum': A Dream and the Sad Awakening. Adelaide Advertiser, 13 January 1934
- My Life Outback, No. 2: Mule Driver's Outsider: On the Track with One-Spur Dick. Melbourne Herald, 13 January 1934
- My Life Outback No. 3: Opal Gouging with Big Jack - and His Cat: How Joke on New Chums Became Good Turn. Melbourne Herald, 15 January 1934
- My Life Outback, No. 7: When Crabby Tom Ran Amok. Melbourne Herald, 19 January 1934
- Up and Down Australia, No. 1: Going Bush. West Australian, 26 January 1934
- Kangaroo Coursing. Melbourne Herald, 27 January 1934
- My Life Outback, No. 8: Sand-storm Terror in Sturts County, No. 8. Melbourne Herald, 29 January 1934
- My Life Outback, No. 11: The Murchison Bones Murder Case. Melbourne Herald, 24 January 1934
- Up and Down Ausrealia, No. 2: Mule Driver's Offsider. West Australian, 2 February 1934
- My Life Outback, No. 5: Tramping by the Darling. Adelaide Advertiser, 10 February 1934
- My Old Pal Buller: Two Camels and - a Scorpion. Melbourne Herald, 10 March 1934
- Plot for a Murder Mystery: Planning a Perfect Crime. Adelaide Advertiser, 17 March 1934
- The Real Australia: The Sheep They Couldn't Kill. Melbourne Herald, 17 March 1934
- The Real Australia: How They Waited for the Rain: The Courage of One Woman. Melbourne Herald, 31 March 1934
- Challenging America! How the Yacht Endeavour was Built. Melbourne Herald, 9 June 1934
- Work of the Bird gatherer. Adelaide Chronicle, 11 July 1934
- Fun For The Afternoon! The Tale of an Intelligent Bull in the Outback. Melbourne Herald, 28 July 1934
- A Tale of Two Worlds. Melbourne Herald, 9 August 1934
- Ringers of the Bells: Secrets of an Ancient Art. Melbourne Herald, 17 November 1934
- Black Man's Eldorado: Rich Reefs of the Imagination. Adelaide Chronicle, 16 May 1935
- The Real Australia. Adelaide Chronicle, 13 June 1935
- Walls of China. Melbourne Herald, 6 November 1937
- His Majesty - The Swordfish. Melbourne Herald, 24 March 1938
- The Art of Writing Mystery Stories. Adelaide Advertiser, 20 July 1940
- The Impossible Perfect Crime. Adelaide Chronicle, 8 December 1949
