= The Widows of Broome =

1950 novel by Australian writer Arthur Upfield

- Author: Arthur Upfield
- Language: English
- Series: Detective Inspector Napoleon 'Bony' Bonaparte
- Genre: Fiction
- Publisher: Doubleday
- Publication date: 1950
- Publication place: Australia
- Media type: Print
- Pages: 204 pp
- Preceded by: The Mountains Have a Secret
- Followed by: The Bachelors of Broken Hill

The Widows of Broome (1950) is a novel by Australian writer Arthur Upfield. It is the thirteenth of the author's novels to feature his recurring character Detective Inspector Napoleon 'Bony' Bonaparte. It was originally published in USA by Doubleday in 1950 under their Crime Club imprint.

== Abstract ==
Two widows are found strangled in the town of Broome, in northern Western Australia, with the killer leaving no clues. Inspector Napoleon Bonaparte is called in to investigate.

== Location ==
Set in Broome, Western Australia.

== Publishing history ==
Following the book's initial publication by Doubleday in 1950 it was subsequently published as follows:

- Heinemann, UK and Australia, 1951
- Penguin, UK, 1962
- Heinemann, UK and Australia, 1967
- Arkon Paperbacks, Australia, 1972
- Angus and Robertson, Australia, 1981

and subsequent paperback, ebook and audio book editions.

The novel was also translated into Spanish in 1953, German in 1956, Czech in 1977, and French in 1995.

== Critical reception ==
A reviewer in The Bulletin found they were "less surprised than disappointed" when the murderer is revealed, feeling that he had "not been woven into the fabric of the book sufficiently for us to believe that he could have taken so large a part in it". They concluded, however, that it "did not seem to matter so much".

Reviewer "J.J.Q." in The Sydney Morning Herald noted, of "Bony" that time "has not diminished his remarkable powers nor the author's ability to devise an unusual plot".

== See also ==
- 1950 in Australian literature
