= Death of a Swagman =

1945 novel by Australian writer Arthur Upfield

- Author: Arthur Upfield
- Language: English
- Series: Detective Inspector Napoleon 'Bony' Bonaparte
- Genre: Fiction
- Publisher: Doubleday Books
- Publication date: 1945
- Publication place: Australia
- Media type: Print
- Pages: 221 pp
- Preceded by: Bushranger of the Skies
- Followed by: The Devil's Steps

Death of a Swagman (1945) is a novel by Australian writer Arthur Upfield. It is the ninth of the author's novels to feature his recurring character Detective Inspector Napoleon 'Bony' Bonaparte. It was originally published in USA by Doubleday Books in 1945.

It was also serialised in weekly instalments in The Sydney Morning Herald newspaper from 20 November 1945 to 19 February 1946.

== Abstract ==
Bony decides to investigate the death of a swagman in a small hut, near the fictitious town of Merino in NSW, after he notices something peculiar in the photograph taken of the scene.

== Location ==
The action of the novel takes place at Walls of China now in Mungo National Park, north-east of Buronga, far south-western NSW.

== Publishing history ==
Following the book's initial publication by Doubleday Books in 1945 it was subsequently published as follows:

- Francis Aldor, UK, 1946
- Angus & Robertson, Australia, 1947
- Signet, USA, 1948

and subsequent paperback, ebook and audio book editions.

== Critical reception ==
Writing in The Courier-Mail Warwick Lawrence commented: "Apart from its criminal plot, there is a feel of the loneliness of the outback in this book. Perhaps because of its local colour, murder or no murder, I enjoyed it for this very reason...Mr. Upfield knows his country and its people. His characters are true to type and alive — except for the corpse, for which I must forgive him."

A. R. McElwain in the Melbourne Herald was not so taken with the work: " Mr Upfield presents a pretty straight-forward plot involving the killing, in the first place, of a tramp. He works in neatly, as a valuable clue, one of those symbols swagmen make on gateposts to indicate to other swaggies how the land lies...But the murderer, I suggest, could have been landed in half the time with a little less Bony and a little more bustle by a couple of sound men from the Sydney CIB."

== See also ==
- 1945 in Australian literature

== Notes ==
- With a touch of humour a writer in The Daily Telegraph (Sydney), on reading this novel, conjectured that "Bony" is the natural son of Sherlock Holmes.
