= Floodhouse =

2003 Australian film

- Directed by: Miro Bilbrough
- Written by: Miro Bilbrough
- Produced by: Peter Sainsbury
- Starring: Victoria Thaine; Robert Menzies; Catherine McClements
- Cinematography: Kim Batterham
- Edited by: Andrew Macneil
- Music by: Amanda Brown
- Release date: 2003
- Running time: 52 minutes
- Country: Australia
- Language: English

Floodhouse is a 2003 Australian film written and directed by Miro Bilborough. It was broadcast nationally on SBS.

Floodhouse was filmed outside Kangaroo Valley starting March 2003.

== Synopsis ==
A teenage girl returns from her Grandmother's place in the city to live with her estranged parents in the country.

== Cast ==
- Victoria Thaine as Mara
- Robert Menzies as Harry
- Catherine McClements as Ava
- Brendan Cowell as Herringbone John

== Reception ==
Richard Kuipers wrote in Variety "“Floodhouse” charts the sensual awakening of a teenage girl in the most fecund of physical and emotional environments. Beautifully photographed, acutely observed and marked by a dazzling lead performance by Victoria Thaine, Miro Bilbrough’s short feature is an auspicious calling card." The Sydney Morning Herald's Doug Anderson says "It's a deeply personal reflection in dark pools of memory but it works with admirable clarity." Robert Fidgeon in the Herald Sun gave it a 4 star capsule review and called it a "stunner".

Barbara Hooks of The Age said "Floodhouse purports to be a comedy romance. And I did titter once or twice, grasping at remotely funny lines like someone dying of thirst receives stray drops of water – gratefully. Bilbrough makes her point – e-vent-ually. But it's so subtle, and the story so uninteresting, that they may be lost – anyone with any sense will have switched over to Red Cap."
