= Wings Above the Diamantina =

1936 novel by Arthur Upfield

- Author: Arthur Upfield
- Language: English
- Series: Detective Inspector Napoleon 'Bony' Bonaparte
- Genre: Mystery
- Publisher: Angus & Robertson
- Publication date: 1936
- Publication place: Australia
- Media type: Print
- Pages: 302 pp
- Preceded by: The Murchison Murders
- Followed by: Mr. Jelly's Business

Wings Above the Diamantina (1936) is a detective novel by Australian writer Arthur Upfield. It was the third to feature his recurring character Detective Inspector Napoleon 'Bony' Bonaparte. It was originally published in Australia by Angus & Robertson in 1936, and subsequently serialised in The Australian Journal between January and September 1936.

== Abstract ==
"In the middle of the night an aeroplane is stolen from the little Queensland township of Golden Dawn. Next day it is found undamaged on the floor of a dry lake 184 miles away. The pilot is missing, but in the passenger's seat reclines a girl, paralysed in every nerve by an unknown drug. For miles round there is not a track, not a footstep, nor a clue to suggest how the pilot, or whoever had poisoned her, managed to leave the machine after it had landed."

== Location ==
The action of the novel takes place in the region of the Diamantina River, which flows from Western Queensland into northern South Australia.

== Publishing history ==
Following the book's initial publication by Angus & Robertson in 1936 it was subsequently published as follows:

- John Hamilton, 1937, UK, under the title Winged Mystery
- Angus & Robertson, 1940, Australia
- Doubleday, 1943, USA, under the title Wings Above the Claypan

and subsequent paperback, ebook and audio book editions.

== Radio adaptation ==
The story was adapted for Australian radio in 1939 starring Ron Randell as Boney. Episodes went for fifteen minutes. George Farwell did the adaptation.

Wireless Weekly said Randell "does justice to the character" and "The story is a complicated one, and must be followed with a certain amount of concentration. If you can induce yourself to make the effort, it is an absorbing tale."

The series played again in 1940.

== Television version ==
This novel was adapted for television as Boney and the Claypan Mystery (1973), from a screenplay by Ted Roberts, and directed by Peter Maxwell: Fauna Productions.

== Critical reception ==
A reviewer in The Sydney Morning Herald was of the opinion that the book would "broaden the bounds of Australian thrillerdom." This after they had noted: "The book is packed with action. There are a dare-devil flying doctor adventures in swimming a storm-flooded river and a graphic description of flying above a sand-cloud which 'had the face of a moving cliff four thousand feet high. The sunlight slanting sharply upon it brought into sharp relief bulging escarpments and inward sucking caverns. It was as though this enormous thing was living; that as it advanced across the world it was actually breathing.'"

The Argus reviewer was impressed with the book: "Mr. Upfield is a first-class narrator, who understands the tricks of dramatic suspense. With his usual ingenuity he presents a situation which will be new to the most hardened reader of mystery stories. Since he does not strive after effect, Mr. Upfield's descriptions of the Diamantina and its inhabitants both block and white, have all the force of sincerity. His graphic power is most happily illustrated in descriptions of natural phenomena–the coming of an enormous sand cloud, gathering storm clouds seen from an aeroplane, the Diamantina in flood. This is an aspect of his work which will appeal to Australians particularly, and is, perhaps, Mr. Upfield, most important achievement."

== See also ==
- 1936 in Australian literature
