= The Sands of Windee =

1931 novel by Arthur Upfield

- Author: Arthur Upfield
- Language: English
- Series: Detective Inspector Napoleon 'Bony' Bonaparte
- Genre: Fiction
- Publisher: Hutchinson
- Publication date: 1931
- Publication place: Australia
- Media type: Print
- Pages: 291 pp
- Preceded by: The Beach of Atonement
- Followed by: A Royal Abduction

The Sands of Windee (1931) is a novel by Australian writer Arthur Upfield. It was the fourth of the author's novels and the second to feature his recurring character Detective Inspector Napoleon 'Bony' Bonaparte. It was originally published in the UK by Hutchinson in 1931. It was republished and reprinted numerous times through 1969 in Australia. It was also translated and published in Germany and Japan, in 1960 and 1983, respectively.

After its initial publication, the book was serialised under the title The Barrakee Mystery in The Herald (Melbourne) in 42 daily instalments between 23 January and 11 March 1932.

Decades later, the novel was adapted as a television movie entitled Boney and the Powder Trail (1973), directed by Peter Maxwell.

== Excerpt of opening ==
"At Windee Station, in the far west of New South Wales, a man named Luke Marks had disappeared. He had been visiting the owner, Jeff Stanton, and his car was found six days after he left the homestead. Detective-Inspector Napoleon Bonaparte, of the Queensland police, who is an educated half-caste, goes to Windee to take up the case."

== Location ==
The action of the novel takes place about 240 kilometers (150 miles) north of Broken Hill.

== Publishing history ==
Following the book's initial publication by Hutchinson in 1931, it was subsequently published as follows:

- Angus & Robertson, 1958, 1961, and 1980 Australia
- Goldmann, 1960, Germany, under the title Ein glücklicher Zufall
- Pacific Books, 1961, Australia; reprinted 1964, 1969
- Hayakawa-shobō, 1983, Japan, under the title Boni to Suna ni kieta otoko, and subsequent paperback, ebook and audio book editions.

== Critical reception ==
A reviewer in The Telegraph (Brisbane) noted: "Mr. Upfield is making for himself a niche among the elect of mystery-story writers and Australia may be proud of the fact that he is making such picturesque and unexaggerated use of the backgrounds provided by bush, seashore, and mountain in this country. And his stories themselves are more transcripts of life than the excited figments of imagination so often found in the crime book. In his latest novel we see him again the faithful portrayer of local colour and life, and again using his gifts in the construction, of a yarn which is typical of bush conditions."

The Herald reviewer "Touchstone" wrote that the character of "Bony" is "a truly original and entertaining character, one who reflects great credit on his creator. Mr Upfield is to be congratulated on giving a local color and setting to the ever-popular detective story. "Bony," as he is familiarly called by his friends, is a lineal descendant of Sherlock Holmes, a true character in his eccentricities, and his own peculiar methods of handling his cases."

== Note ==
The book achieved some degree of notoriety during the murder trial of "Snowy" Rowles, an acquaintance of Upfield. The author testified that the two men had earlier discussed a method of body disposal that could destroy physical evidence of a murder, which he later published in this novel.

Rowles was charged, convicted and later executed for the murder of Louis Carron, a New Zealander. He had apparently skipped a step in the "method" and left some forensic evidence at the scene. Rowles was also suspected of having been involved in the earlier disappearances and presumed deaths of two Australian men, James Ryan and George Lloyd. These deaths came to be referred to as the Murchison Murders.

== Adaptation ==
This book was adapted as a television series episode entitled Boney and the Powder Trail (1973), from a screenplay by Tony Morphett, and directed by Peter Maxwell. It was produced by Fauna Productions.

== See also ==
- 1931 in Australian literature
