= Mr. Jelly's Business =

1937 novel by Arthur Upfield

- Title page for Mr. Jelly's Business (1937)
- Author: Arthur Upfield
- Language: English
- Series: Detective Inspector Napoleon 'Bony' Bonaparte
- Genre: Fiction
- Publisher: Angus & Robertson
- Publication date: 1937
- Publication place: Australia
- Media type: Print
- Pages: 286 pp
- Preceded by: Wings Above the Diamantina
- Followed by: Winds of Evil

Mr. Jelly's Business (1937) is a novel by Australian writer Arthur Upfield. It was the fourth to feature his recurring character Detective Inspector Napoleon 'Bony' Bonaparte. It was originally published in Australia by Angus & Robertson in 1937, after being serialised in the Daily News (Perth, Western Australia) between December 1932 and January 1933.

== Abstract ==
"At 1.10 a.m. on November 2, Leonard Wallace, licensee of Burracoppin Hotel, and George Loftus drive away in the rain from the hotel in Loftus's car. Wallace returns to his bedroom at 2.15 a.m., saying he left Loftus while they were drunk some miles down the track. The car is found smashed. Hats belonging to Loftus and Wallace are found near the car and two empty beer bottles. Of Loftus these is no sign. Detective Sergeant Muir, of Perth, who bungled a Gascoyne case and allowed the 'wanted' man, Andrews to get away to Queensland, agrees to let the brilliant half-caste Detective-Inspector Napoleon Bonaparte of the Queensland C.I.B. handle the Burracoppin case while he himself goes after Andrews."

== Location ==
Takes place at Burracoppin and Merredin east of Perth in the Wheatbelt of Western Australia along the rabbit-proof fence.

== Publishing history ==
Following the book's initial publication by Angus & Robertson in 1937 it was subsequently published as follows:

- John Hamilton, 1939, UK
- Angus & Robertson, 1964, 1965, and 1981, Australia
- Doubleday, 1943, USA, under the title Murder Down Under

and subsequent paperback, ebook and audio book editions.

- It was translated into German and French (1998).

== Critical reception ==
A reviewer in The Newcastle Sun was impressed with the main character of the novels: "Bonaparte is really a most interesting character. He confounds popular tradition by combining many of the virtues instead of all the vices of the races in his divided ancestry. Added to which he is a most efficient officer of police whose success is due not to fortuitous gifts of coincidence or ridiculously brilliant (and lucky) deduction, but to a calm and practical reasoning along that trail of common sense which has led to more real-life murderers than a library full of those fantastic (if diverting) methods of trailing the villain to which we have become accustomed in popular fiction."

The Sydney Morning Herald reviewer was less impressed with the book, calling it "neither thriller nor particularly mysterious". They then conclude: "Mr. Upfield creates his Australian atmosphere mainly by putting colloquialisms into the dialogue allotted to his 'local' characters. This and the mixed blood and consequent sensitiveness of Detective-Inspector Napoleon Bonaparte give the book a faintly individual flavour."

== See also ==
- 1937 in Australian literature
