= 3 Acts of Murder =

2009 television film directed by Rowan Woods

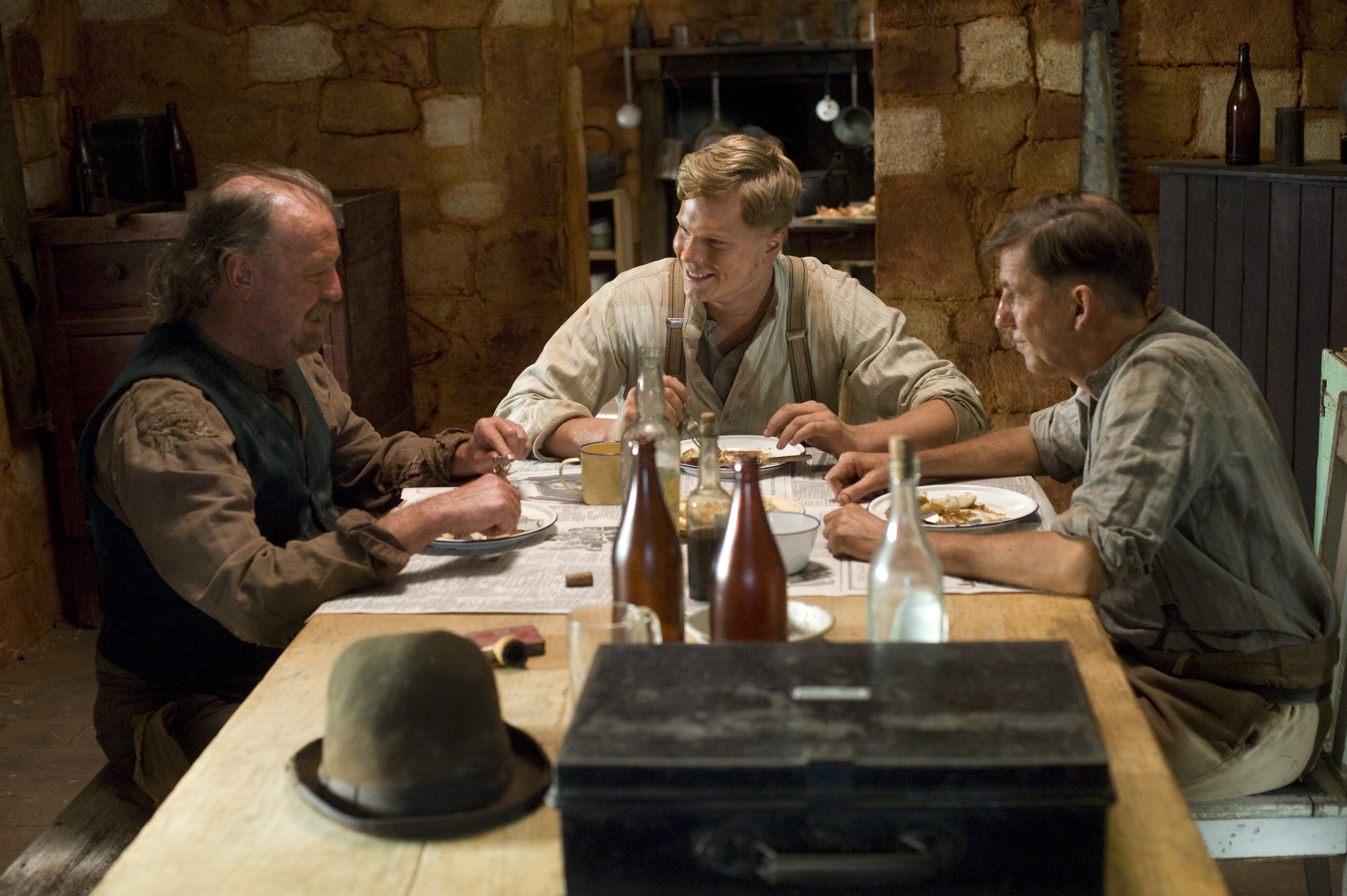
- Scene from the Film
- Written by: Ian David
- Directed by: Rowan Woods
- Starring: Robert Menzies; Bille Brown; Luke Ford; Emma Booth
- Country of origin: Australia
- Original language: English

Production
- Producer: Sue Taylor

Original release
- Release: 14 June 2009

3 Acts of Murder is a 2009 Australian television film directed by Rowan Woods. It is based on the true-life story of how author Arthur Upfield inadvertently inspired The Murchison Murders.

== Cast ==
- Robert Menzies as Upfield
- Luke Ford as Snowy Rowles
- Emma Booth as Sarah Corbett
- Bille Brown as George Ritchie
- Trevor Jamieson as Larry Dooley
- Ningali Lawford as Emily Dooley
- Ian Meadows as George Lloyd
- Anni Finsterer as Anne Upfield
- Nicholas Hope as Harry Manning

== Broadcast ==
It screened on the Australian Broadcasting Corporation on 14 June 2009 at 8.30pm and again in September 2013, October 2014 and August 2015.
