= The Barrakee Mystery =

Novel by Australian writer Arthur Upfield

- Author: Arthur Upfield
- Language: English
- Series: Detective Inspector Napoleon 'Bony' Bonaparte
- Genre: Fiction
- Publisher: Hutchinson
- Publication date: 1929
- Publication place: Australia
- Media type: Print
- Pages: 288 pp
- Preceded by: The House of Cain
- Followed by: The Beach of Atonement

The Barrakee Mystery (1929) is a novel by Australian writer Arthur Upfield. It was the second of the author's novels, his first crime novel and the first to feature his recurring character Detective Inspector Napoleon 'Bony' Bonaparte. It was originally published in the UK by Hutchinson in 1929, and subsequently serialised in The Herald in Melbourne in 42 daily instalments between 23 July and 9 September 1932.

== Abstract ==
"The whirr of a boomerang in the dark — sounds of a struggle — a figure in white, that melted in the gloom.

"The mystery surrounding the death, upon a far northern sheep station, of an aborigine supplies the central theme of the arresting story, "The Barrakee Mystery," by A. W. Upfield."

== Location ==
The action of the novel takes place around the Darling River, in New South Wales.

== Publishing history ==
Following the book's initial publication by Hutchinson in 1929 it was subsequently published as follows:

- Heinemann, 1965, UK
- Doubleday, 1965, USA; as part of their Crime Club Special series under the title The Lure of the Bush
- Goldman, 1966, Germany; under the title Bony und der Bumerang; and then reprinted in 1966 and 1974
- Pan Books, 1969, UK; and then reprinted in 1970
- Heinemann, 1972, UK

and subsequent paperback, ebook and audio book editions.

== Critical reception ==
The Herald reviewer "Papercutter" called the novel "one of the most exciting, well constructed, and well written tales we have read for a long time." They then went on to note: "It is a first-rate yarn full of a genuine Australian appeal, which is in no way forced."

In The Brisbane Courier noted: "The scenes of life on a Western sheep station are very faithfully portrayed, and Mr. Upfield has definitely improved in character drawing."

== See also ==
- 1929 in Australian literature
