= Winds of Evil =

Novel by Australian writer Arthur Upfield

- Author: Arthur Upfield
- Language: English
- Series: Detective Inspector Napoleon 'Bony' Bonaparte
- Genre: Fiction
- Publisher: Angus & Robertson
- Publication date: 1937
- Publication place: Australia
- Media type: Print
- Pages: 257 pp
- Preceded by: Mr. Jelly's Business
- Followed by: The Bone is Pointed

Winds of Evil (1937) is a novel by Australian writer Arthur Upfield. It was the fifth of the author's novels to feature his recurring character Detective Inspector Napoleon 'Bony' Bonaparte. It was originally published in the Australia by Angus & Robertson in 1937, and subsequently serialised in The Australian Journal in Melbourne between March and October 1937.

== Abstract ==
"It's a weird mystery of an apparently maniacal murderer, 'The Strangler,' who on nights of wind and sandstorm waylays and throttles his belated victims. The grim homicide is evidently as powerful and active as a gorilla, and can travel from tree to tree in gorilla fashion. A mystery develops which is partly horrible and partly psychic, and it is finally solved in strange fashion."

== Location ==
The action of the novel takes place around Silverton, New South Wales and the nearby Barrier Range which is north and east of Broken Hill.

== Publishing history ==
Following the book's initial publication by Angus & Robertson in 1937 it was subsequently published as follows:

- John Hamilton, 1939, UK
- Doubleday, 1944, USA; as part of their Crime Club Special series
- Angus & Robertson, 1961 and 1963, Australia

and subsequent paperback, ebook and audio book editions.

It was translated in German (1961), Japanese (1982) and French (1998).

== Critical reception ==
The Examiner reviewer noted: "In Winds of Evil Mr. Upfield has developed the theory that weather has an influence on the actions of men, and each time a heavy electrically-charged dust storm sweeps over the outback town of Carie he allows murder to be done. Into the story, too, is introduced the theory of pre-natal influence. Mr. Upfield tells his tale plainly and convincingly, and, in doing so, produces a fine mixture of drama and humour."

In the Workers' Weekly, Jean Devanny concluded: "It is safe to say that the reader desiring relaxation from heavy reading, or one seeking mere entertainment will find in Upfield's book all the interest of a thriller cinema show and more prolonged."

== Television adaptation ==
The novel was adapted for television in 1973 in a one-hour episode, titled "Boney and the Strangler", of the Boney series. It was directed by Peter Maxwell, from a script by Tony Morphett.

== See also ==
- 1937 in Australian literature
