= 1879 in Australian literature =

This article presents a list of the historical events and publications of Australian literature during 1879.

== Books ==
- Ada Cambridge — In Two Years Time
- John Boyle O'Reilly – Moondyne
- Catherine Helen Spence – Handfasted

== Poetry ==
- Adam Lindsay Gordon
  - Poems of the Late Adam Lindsay Gordon
  - "To My Sister"
- Henry Kendall
  - "Araluen"
  - "Hy-Brasil"
  - "On a Street"
  - "Orara"
  - "The Sydney International Exhibition"

== Non-fiction ==
- Ned Kelly – The Jerilderie Letter

== Births ==
A list, ordered by date of birth (and, if the date is either unspecified or repeated, ordered alphabetically by surname) of births in 1879 of Australian literary figures, authors of written works or literature-related individuals follows, including year of death.

- 22 February – Norman Lindsay, novelist and artist (died 1969)
- 8 June — Nita Kibble, librarian (died 1962)
- 14 October – Miles Franklin, novelist (died 1954)

Unknown date

- Dorothy Frances McCrae, poet and short story writer (died 1937)

== Deaths ==
A list, ordered by date of death (and, if the date is either unspecified or repeated, ordered alphabetically by surname) of deaths in 1879 of Australian literary figures, authors of written works or literature-related individuals follows, including year of birth.

- 6 January – Ellen Davitt, crime novelist (born 1812)

== See also ==
- 1879 in Australia
- 1879 in literature
- 1879 in poetry
- List of years in Australian literature
- List of years in literature
