= Bony (TV series) =

- Genre: Crime
- Directed by: Gary Conway; Chris Langman
- Starring: Cameron Daddo; Christian Kohlund
- Countries of origin: Australia; Germany
- Original language: English
- No. of seasons: 1
- No. of episodes: 13

Production
- Running time: 60 minutes

Original release
- Network: Seven Network
- Release: 15 August – 19 December 1992

Bony is an Australian television series made in 1992. The series of 13 episodes followed on from a telemovie made in 1990. The series was criticised for casting a white man (Cameron Daddo) as the title character Detective David John "Bony" Bonaparte, under the tutelage of "Uncle Albert", an elderly Aboriginal person played by Burnum Burnum. Bony was supposed to be a descendant of the Bony character created by Arthur Upfield in dozens of novels from the late 1920s until his death in 1964.

== Cast ==
=== Main / regular ===
- Cameron Daddo as Detective David John 'Bony' Bonaparte
- Burnum Burnum as 'Uncle Albert' Harris
- Christian Kohlund as Detective Sergeant Frank Fisher
- Terence Cooper as Inspector Leo Vincetti
- Mandy Bowden as Constable Bev Miles

=== Guests ===
- Alan Fletcher as Pryor (1 episode)
- Annie Jones as Sarah (1 episode)
- Anthony Hawkins as Evan Baxter (1 episode)
- Briony Behets (1 episode)
- Darren Yap as Chang (1 episode)
- Frankie J. Holden as Croft (1 episode)
- Guy Pearce as Craig (1 episode)
- Jan Adele as Mrs Adele (1 episode)
- Lenita Vangellis as Rina (1 episode)
- Libby Tanner as Jenny (1 episode)
- Mark Lee as Dave O'Dwyer (1 episode)
- Nicki Paull as Jane (1 episode)
- Penne Hackforth-Jones as Eve (1 episode)
- Robert Mammone (1 episode)
- Rod Mullinar as Selby (1 episode)
- Sophie Heathcote as Sally (1 episode)
- Steven Vidler as Jackson (1 episode)
- Tina Bursill as Peta (1 episode)
- Tony Rickards as Smooch (1 episode)
- Vince Martin as Greg (1 episode)
- Wynn Roberts as Templeman (1 episode)

== Pilot ==
Bony
- Directed by: Henri Safran
- Written by: Everett De Roche
- Based on: an idea by Reg Watson
- Produced by: David Lee; Jan Badlier
- Starring: Cameron Daddo; Catherine Oxenberg; David Reyne; Burnum Burnum; Tom Richards; Mandy Bowden
- Release date: 5 September 1990
- Running time: 96 mins
- Country: Australia
- Language: English

The pilot film to the series aired in 1990. It concerns Bony investigating an attempted rape allegation.

== See also ==
- Boney (TV series)
