= Bony (character) =

Napoleon "Bony" Bonaparte
- First appearance: The Barrakee Mystery (1929)
- Last appearance: The Lake Frome Monster (1966)
- Created by: Arthur Upfield
- Portrayed by: Ron Randell; Frank Thring; James Laurenson; Cameron Daddo

In-universe information
- Gender: Male
- Title: Detective inspector
- Occupation: Police officer; Tracker
- Spouse: Marie
- Children: 3
- Nationality: Australian

Detective Inspector Napoleon "Bony" Bonaparte is a fictional character created by Australian novelist Arthur Upfield (1890–1964). Bony is a biracial Aboriginal Australian detective with a reputation for solving difficult cases by finding subtle clues. Upfield introduced the character in his 1929 novel The Barrakee Mystery. He published a total of 29 novels, through 1966, featuring this character.

Upfield said that he based the character on Tracker Leon, a biracial Aboriginal Australian man who worked for the Queensland Police.

== Biography ==
In the novel, Napoleon "Bony" Bonaparte is the son of an Aboriginal Australian mother and a white father. He was born during a time when an interracial relationship between an Aboriginal and a white person was forbidden. Bony was found in his dead mother's arms, and was taken in and reared by a Catholic mission. They named him Napoleon Bonaparte, after the French military leader who lived from 1769 to 1821.

Bonaparte (nicknamed "Bony") holds a Bachelor of Arts degree from Queensland University.

He is a detective inspector with the Queensland Police who makes use of the skills he has acquired in his past. He applies his astounding tracking abilities to crime investigation, and has earned a peerless reputation for solving cases. Occasionally, Queensland's criminal investigation department sends him on assignment to another jurisdiction in Australia, if a murder case there confuses the local authorities.

Some of his assignments require him to work undercover. During an undercover operation, he may pose as a station hand or labourer, with only a few senior police aware of his secret identity. He sometimes uses an alias, such as Nat Bonnar or (as in Death of a Swagman) Robert Burns. When he gives his real name, he often adds, "My friends call me Bony".

Bony says that he has been sacked several times for disobeying direct orders from his superiors (most usually Col. Spendor), but adds that he is always reinstated almost immediately. He and his wife, Marie, live in Banyo, a suburb of Brisbane. They have three adult sons; the eldest, Charles, is studying to be a doctor.

== Appearances ==
=== Novels ===
№	Title	Publication date	Reissue title
1	The Barrakee Mystery	1929	—N/a
2	The Sands of Windee	1931	—N/a
3	Wings Above the Diamantina	1936	—N/a
4	Mr. Jelly's Business	1937	Murder Down Under
5	Winds of Evil	1937	—N/a
6	The Bone is Pointed	1938	—N/a
7	The Mystery of Swordfish Reef	1939	—N/a
8	Bushranger of the Skies	1940	No Footprints in the Bush
9	Death of a Swagman	1945	—N/a
10	The Devil's Steps	1946	—N/a
11	An Author Bites the Dust	1948	—N/a
12	The Mountains Have a Secret	1948	—N/a
13	The Widows of Broome	1950	—N/a
14	The Bachelors of Broken Hill	1950	—N/a
15	The New Shoe	1951	—N/a
16	Venom House	1952	—N/a
17	Murder Must Wait	1953	—N/a
18	Death of a Lake	1954	—N/a
19	Sinister Stones	1954	Cake in the Hat Box
20	The Battling Prophet	1956	—N/a
21	Man of Two Tribes	1956	—N/a
22	The Bushman Who Came Back	1957	Bony Buys a Woman
23	Bony and the Black Virgin	1959	The Torn Branch
24	Journey to the Hangman	1959	Bony and the Mouse
25	Valley of Smugglers	1960	Bony and the Kelly Gang
26	The White Savage	1961	Bony and the White Savage
27	The Will of the Tribe	1962	—N/a
28	Madman's Bend	1963	The Body at Madman's Bend
29	The Lake Frome Monster	1966	—N/a

==== The Sands of Windee ====
While working in the late 1920s on his second 'Bony' novel, published in 1931 as The Sands of Windee, Arthur Upfield discussed plot ideas with his outback companions. He had hit on what seemed to be a foolproof way to hide the evidence of murder. One of his companions who was part of these early discussions was Snowy Rowles.

Rowles was later arrested on charges of murder of one man, but came to be associated with the murder of two other men. He had destroyed the physical evidence, apparently by the method discussed with Upfield. But in the last murder, he had left some evidence and was convicted and sentenced to death. Upfield was forced to testify to their earlier discussions at Rowles's trial.

The ensuing publicity surrounding the sensational Murchison Murders—as they came to be called—greatly improved the sales of Upfield's 1931 novel. The ensuing notoriety helped to catalyze Upfield's rise to fame.

== Adaptations ==
There have been multiple adaptations of the Bony books. None of the actors who played the character was Aboriginal.

=== Radio ===
Wings Above the Diamantina was adapted for radio in 1939 starring Ron Randell as Boney.

The novels were adapted for radio in 1954 by Morris West as Man of Two Tribes. Frank Thring played Bonaparte.

=== Television ===
Two series of adaptations featuring the Bony character have been made for television. Both starred white actors in the role.

The first adaptation aired for two series between 1971 and 1972. New Zealand actor James Laurenson, a white man, played Bonaparte wearing dark makeup. His casting was controversial, as many people believed that the role should have been filled by an Australian Aboriginal. (Indigenous actor Jack Charles had auditioned for the role.) The character's name was spelt 'Boney' for the series, and some editions of the novels kept this spelling for later editions.

A 1990 telemovie and later a 1992 spin-off TV series (using the original 'Bony' spelling) were also made. These were not related to the novels except for some uses of the lead character. The pilot film depicted the titular protagonist (here named David John Bonaparte) as the grandson of the original Bony. Cameron Daddo played the role and the casting was criticised. In the series his ethnicity was altered: he was identified as a white man who had been raised by Aboriginals.

Cameron Daddo played the character. Burnum Burnum co-starred as Bony's aboriginal mentor Uncle Albert.

== See also ==
- Fictional detectives
- List of male detective characters
