= Lamont Young =

Australian surveyor

- Born: Lamont H. Young; 1851; Australia
- Died: 1880 (aged 28–29); Bermagui, New South Wales, Australia
- Occupation: Geological surveyor

Lamont H. Young (1851–1880) was an Australian assistant geological surveyor for the New South Wales Mines Department. He mysteriously disappeared while on field-work at Bermagui, New South Wales.

== Disappearance ==
Young was inspecting the new goldfields at Bermagui in 1880. To investigate possible sites further north, Young and his assistant travelled on a small boat with the boat's owner, Thomas Towers of Batemans Bay, and two of Towers' friends. All five disappeared on 10 October. In the morning the boat was observed, but stationary and with apparently only one man on board. Later in the day the vessel was seen stranded on the rocks with no-one on board. The boat was found to contain five bags full of clothing, Young's books and papers, a bullet in its starboard side and some vomit. The men were not found despite subsequent searches, rewards, government inquiries and wide media coverage. The remnants of a fire, some food and three shirt studs were the only traces. The mystery was never solved. Unusual aspects of the wreck were that the planks of the boat were stove-out rather than stove-in, the boat contained several large rocks and the anchor and stern ropes were missing.

Apart from Thomas Towers and Lamont Young, the other men who disappeared were Young's assistant Max Schneider and the other two boatmen, William Lloyd and Daniel Casey.

== Memorial ==
Mystery Bay received its name because of the disappearance. The bay is 15 kilometres north of Bermagui, midway between Bermagui and Narooma, near Tilba. There is a park and a road at Mystery Bay named after Lamont Young. A monument was erected at Mystery Bay in 1980 to mark the centenary of the disappearance.

The wrong names are recorded on the monument. The accompanying boatmen were Daniel Casey and William Henry Lloyd. Bartholomew Casey was the son of Daniel Casey and lived to be 82 years old. Daniel's wife Anne Casey was buried at Moruya. Her gravestone correctly records that it was her husband Daniel that disappeared.

Anne Casey (née Franklin) was the sister of Joseph Franklin, the grandfather of (Stella Maria) Miles Franklin who wrote My Brilliant Career.

== The disappearance in literature ==
The plot of Arthur Upfield's detective novel, The Mystery of Swordfish Reef, is based on Young's disappearance.

The Australian author, Cyril Pearl also wrote of the mystery in his 1978 book, Five Men Vanished: The Bermagui Mystery.

A 1910 article, "Bermagui – In a Strange Sunset", by Henry Lawson published in The Bulletin, describes a steamer journey from Bermagui to Sydney. Lawson mentions the disappearance of Young 30 years before.

== See also ==
- List of people who disappeared mysteriously at sea
