= James Laurenson =

New Zealand stage and screen actor (1940–2024)

- Born: James Philip Laurenson; 17 February 1940; Marton, New Zealand
- Died: 18 April 2024 (aged 84); Frome, Somerset, England
- Occupation: Actor
- Years active: 1960s–2020s
- Spouses: Carol MacReady (m. 1970; div. 1997); Cari Haysom (m. ?)
- Children: 1

James Philip Laurenson (17 February 1940 – 18 April 2024) was a New Zealand stage and screen actor based in the United Kingdom.

== Early life ==
Laurenson was born in Marton, New Zealand. He studied theatre at Canterbury University College in Christchurch (now University of Canterbury). There he was directed by Dame Ngaio Marsh, notably in the title role in Macbeth at the Civic Theatre Christchurch in 1962.

During the mid-1960s he moved to the United Kingdom. He made his film debut in 1969 with a small part in Women in Love, based on the D. H. Lawrence novel. He also had an uncredited part (as an Oxford rower, playing alongside Graham Chapman) in The Magic Christian.

== Career ==
Laurenson appeared in numerous British Shakespearean productions, notably Richard II, and as Rosencrantz in Hamlet. He performed on radio in the marathon series, Vivat Rex. He also appeared as Piers Gaveston in the 1970 production of Christopher Marlowe's Edward II, opposite Ian McKellen. The latter actor later recalled that kissing Laurenson "was a bonus throughout the run". Other costume roles by Laurenson included a French courtier in Elizabeth R and the Earl of Lincoln in Shadow of the Tower (1972).

That same year (1972), he took on a more modern role starring as Det. Inspector Napoleon "Boney" Bonaparte in the Australian TV drama series Boney. His character was a police detective who was half-Aboriginal. His two seasons in that role was his most high-profile part. Some Australian critics, including from within the Australian Aboriginal community criticised the casting of a white man in the role, believing that an Aboriginal actor would have been ideal.

In 1974, Laurenson took the lead role in the TV film The Prison, based on the novel by Georges Simenon. This was the first instalment in the Thames Television/Euston Films series Armchair Cinema. He also starred as Pink's Father in the 1982 film, Pink Floyd—The Wall.

Laurenson took the lead role of Julian Marsh in the 1984 West End production of Gower Champion's musical 42nd Street at the Theatre Royal, Drury Lane. This was his only role in a musical. He made another notable stage appearance at Greenwich Theatre in Falling Over England with Charlotte Cornwell.

Throughout his career, Laurenson had guest roles in numerous popular TV series such as Z-Cars, Space: 1999, The Professionals, Armchair Thriller, Hammer House of Horror, Remington Steele, Cagney and Lacey, Hammer House of Mystery and Suspense, Inspector Morse, Bergerac, Boon, Lovejoy, Prime Suspect, Sharpe, A Touch of Frost, Heartbeat, Silent Witness, Taggart, Midsomer Murders, State of Play, Hustle, Endeavour and Spooks.

Laurenson had many appearances on BBC Radio, including the role of the Squire of Altarnun in the 1991 adaptation of Daphne Du Maurier's Jamaica Inn.

In 2012, he played the Earl of Westmoreland in the BBC Two adaptations of Henry IV, Parts I and II. In 2013 he appeared as Professor Hilary Ambrose in Season 2, Episode 5 of the BBC One's Father Brown series. In 2016, he played the role of John Weir in the Netflix series The Crown.

== Personal life and death ==
Laurenson was married twice, first to actress Carol MacReady, with whom he had one son. He had made his long-term home in the English market town of Frome, in Somerset. He died on 18 April 2024, aged 84.

== Film and TV Acting roles ==
- Coronation Street (1968, TV) – Rev. Peter Hope
- Treasure Island (1968, TV) – Dick Johnson
- Women in Love (1969) – Minister
- The Magic Christian (1969) – Oxford crewman, uncredited
- Edward II (1970, TV) – Piers Gaveston
- Elizabeth R (1971, TV) – Jean de Simier
- Assault (1971) – Greg Lomax
- Boney (1971–72, TV series) – Detective Inspector Bonaparte (Boney)
- The Shadow of the Tower (1972, TV) – Earl of Lincoln
- Space: 1999 (1976, TV), Catacombs of the Moon – Patrick Osgood
- Esther Waters (1977, TV) – William Latch
- Hammer House of Horror (1980, TV), Rude Awakening – Mr Rayburn
- The Monster Club (1980) – Raven (The Shadmock)
- Pink Floyd – The Wall (1982) – Pink's Father
- Remington Steele (1984, TV) – Raymond Merleau
- Heartbreakers (1984) – Terry Ray
- Artists and Models (1986, TV) - Jacques-Louis David
- Inspector Morse: The Dead of Jericho (1987, TV) – Tony Richards
- The Man Who Fell to Earth (1987, TV film) – Felix Hawthorne
- The Bourne Identity (1988, TV) – Gillette (2 episodes)
- Countdown to War (1989, TV) – Count Ciano
- The Man Inside (1990) – Mueller
- Lovejoy (1992, TV), Benin Bronze – Greg Veitch
- Sharpe (1996-1997, TV) – Hector Ross (5 episodes)
- A House in the Hills (1993) – Ronald Rankin
- This Is Personal: The Hunt for the Yorkshire Ripper (2000, TV) – Chief Constable Ronald Gregory
- Heartbeat (2001) - Det. Ch. Supt. Tatton
- Silent Witness: Beyond Guilt (2003, TV) – Professor Peter Sachs
- Three Blind Mice (2003) – William Storbest
- Dalziel and Pascoe: Soft Touch (2004, TV) – Richard Mattis
- One Day (2011) – Mr Cope
- Henry IV, Parts I and II (2012, TV) – Earl of Westmoreland
- The Riot Club (2014) – College President
- Wolf Hall (2015 TV) ep. 1: Three-Card Trick – Earl of Shrewsbury
- The Crown (2016, TV) – Doctor Weir, recurring role, 5 episodes
- Father Brown (2014, 2017, TV), S2E6 The Mystery Of The Rosary (2014) – Professor Hilary Ambrose, S5E10 The Alchemist's Secret (2017) Professor Hilary Ambrose
- Endeavour: Game (2017, TV) – Professor George Amory
- Quacks (2017, TV), The Bishop’s Appendix – Mr Agar
- The Terror (2018, TV) – Episode: Go for Broke, Punished as a Boy – Sir John Barrow
