= Burnum Burnum =

Australian Aboriginal activist and author (1936–1997)

- Born: 10 January 1936; Wallaga Lake, New South Wales, Australia
- Died: 17 August 1997 (aged 61); Woronora, New South Wales, Australia
- Other name: Harry Penrith (rejected name from christening)
- Occupations: Activist, actor, author

Burnum Burnum (10 January 1936 – 17 August 1997) was an Aboriginal Australian sportsman, activist, actor, and author. He was a Woiworrung and Yorta Yorta man, born at Wallaga Lake in southern New South Wales. He was originally christened Harry Penrith but in 1976, he changed his name to Burnum Burnum ("Great Warrior") after his grandfather both to honour him and acknowledge his Aboriginal identity.

== Early life ==
Burnum Burnum was one of the Stolen Generations, taken from his parents when he was barely three months old. Featured on Late Night Live with Phillip Adams in 1999, the story of his early years graphically illustrates the brutality of the assimilation policy in the middle decades of the 20th century. He was raised as an orphan and as a white person, given the name Harry Penrith, and was taught that white was good and black bad. He spent many years in children's homes run by the NSW Aborigines Welfare Board, most notably the Kinchela Aboriginal Boys' Training Home at Kempsey where he was abused, for example, being beaten with a cattle whip for accidentally breaking a window with a cricket ball, and being forced to say "Look at me and you will see that I am an Aborigine" in front of his class.

In its magazine Dawn, the Aborigines Welfare Board promoted his achievements in rugby league and surf lifesaving at Kempsey, and reported that he left Kinchela to become a pioneer Aboriginal employee in the NSW Public Service, working for the Department of Agriculture, where he remained for 13 years. But Stolen Generations people like Burnum, though raised "white", were often rejected by white society. In the 1960s, he searched for his Aboriginal identity and joined the battle for Aboriginal rights.

== Sportsman ==
Burnum Burnum also played first grade Rugby Union for Parramatta, New South Wales, as well as rugby league and cricket.

== Activism ==
Burnum Burnum became involved in Australian Indigenous rights activism while attending the University of Tasmania in the late 1960s. He continued his activism after becoming a Bahá’í, and successfully campaigned for the skeleton of the last full-blooded Aboriginal Tasmanian woman, Truganini, to be removed from display in the Museum of Tasmania. It was released and cremated at her place of birth in 1976. He was awarded a Churchill Fellowship in 1975 to study hostel provisions for Indigenous people overseas.

Burnum Burnum was instrumental in the creation of the Black Community School in Townsville, North Queensland in 1973 alongside his friend Eddie Koiki Mabo and his wife Bonita. In conversation with Noel Loos, Mabo explained how he (Mabo) had gotten the school "off the ground" with the help of Burnum Burnum, adding that "He (Burnum Burnum) put it all together".

He may be best remembered for planting the Aboriginal flag in front of the white cliffs of Dover on the Australian Bicentenary Day of 26 January 1988, to satirically claim England on behalf of the Aboriginal people of Australia, mirroring what Arthur Phillip had done in Burnum Burnum's homeland in 1788, after arriving with the First Fleet. However, Burnum stated that no harm would come to England's native people as a result of his invasion. A copy of the Burnum Burnum Declaration is on display among the Indigenous carvings and sculptures at the Enchanted Maze (a.k.a. Arthur's Seat Maze), on the Mornington Peninsula in Victoria.

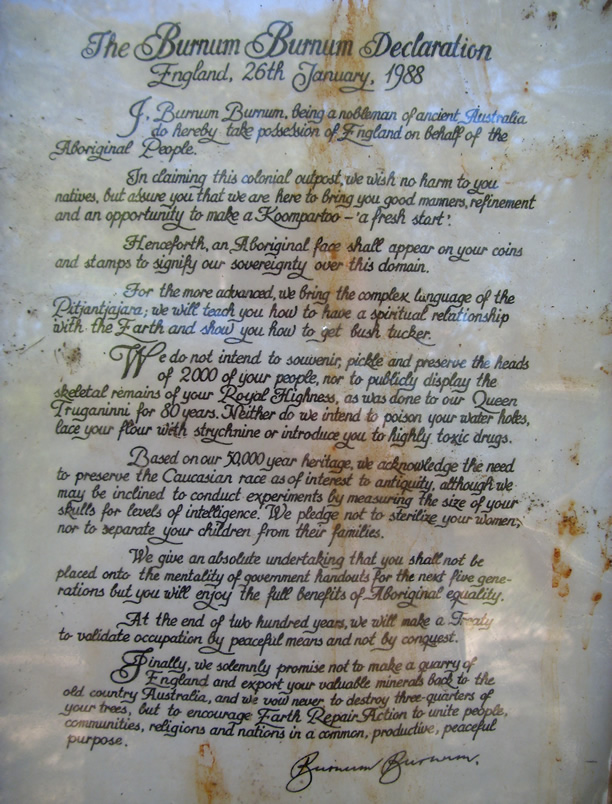
The Burnum Burnum Declaration

Burnum first came into contact with the Bahá’í Faith in 1956, and formally identified as a Bahá’í in 1969. He later cited the consistent love shown to him by Bahá’ís as the reason for his becoming a Bahá'í and being active in teaching the Bahá'í Faith. In the early 1970s, he was elected as one of nine members of Australia's Bahá'í administrative body (the National Spiritual Assembly of the Bahá'ís of Australia) and served with distinction. In 1975, he encountered American playwright and author, Tom Lysaght, at the Canberra Airport, invited Lysaght to his home, and both introduced the fledgling young writer to the Bahá'í Movement and confirmed Lysaght in his new faith.

In 1989, Burnum was interviewed by Caroline Jones on her Radio National program, The Search for Meaning.

== Acting ==
In 1983, Burnum Burnum appeared in Golden Dolphin Productions' Gold Hugo-winning documentary Drought, narrating the indigenous legend of Tiddalik the giant frog. In 1986, he played roles in three films. The first was Dark Age, a thriller set in outback and tropical Australia, which also starred David Gulpillil as Burnum's son. The second was Ground Zero, a thriller containing themes critical of the British and Australian government's treatment of Indigenous Australians during nuclear weapon testing at Maralinga. The third was a satirical film, Marsupials: The Howling III, in which Burnum's character becomes a werewolf in the form of a Tasmanian tiger.

Burnum appeared as Uncle Albert in the 1992 TV series Bony, which was inspired by Arthur Upfield's novels about Bony, an Aboriginal detective.

== Politics ==
Burnum stood for election to the Australian Senate, as an independent in New South Wales in the 1983 and 1984 Federal election. He was also an Australian Democrats candidate for the New South Wales Legislative Assembly in the 1988 North Shore state by-election.

Former Prime Minister John Howard described Burnum Burnum as "a very gracious man and very strongly committed to the welfare of Aboriginal Australians".

== Death ==
In his later life, Burnum Burnum lived in Woronora, a suburb in the Sutherland Shire, where he was active in the local community. He died from heart disease on 17 August 1997, aged 61. His death received considerable media coverage, including an obituary in The New York Times. A portrait of Burnum Burnum now hangs in Sutherland Library. In 2005, Jannali Reserve on the banks of the Woronora River was renamed Burnum Burnum Sanctuary in his honour.
