= Mystery Bay, New South Wales =

Mystery Bay
- Town
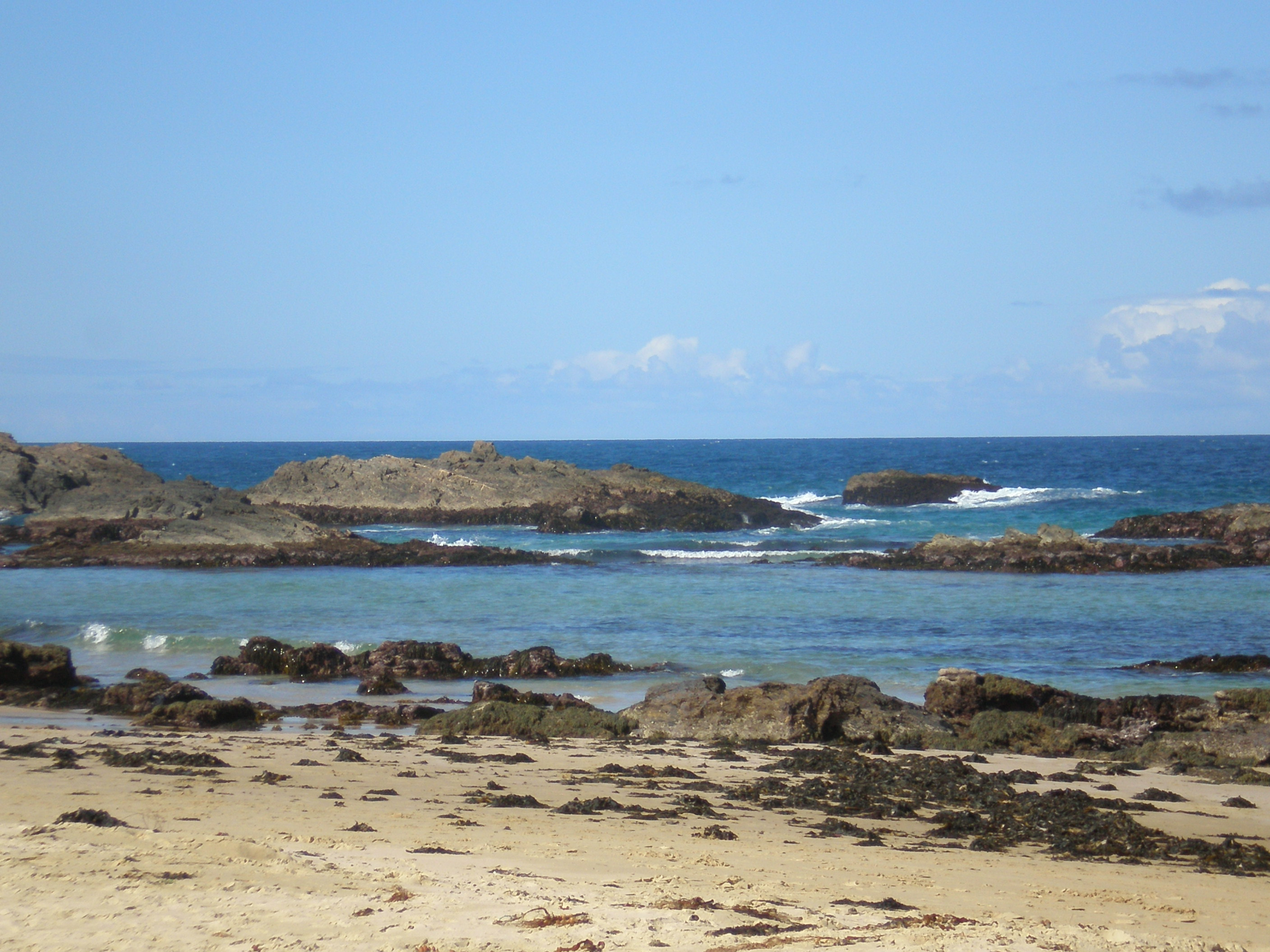
- A beach at Mystery Bay

- Coordinates: 36°18′13″S 150°07′49″E
- Country: Australia
- State: New South Wales
- LGA: Eurobodalla Shire

Government
  - State electorate: Bega
  - Federal division: Eden-Monaro

Population
  - Total: 191 (2016 census)
- Postcode: 2546

Mystery Bay is a small town on the south coast of New South Wales, Australia. Mystery Bay is halfway between Central Tilba and Narooma, two kilometres off the Princes Highway on Mystery Bay Road. At the 2016 census, Mystery Bay had a population of 191. Mystery Bay features a camping area in the Eurobodalla National Park. This park is known for its recreational activities and various species of Bird. Montague Island is close to Mystery Bay and is known for its unusual quantities of Penguin called Eudyptula minor (Little penguin) and fur seals. There is also an Infestation of a specific type of House mouse called Mus musculus which has needed eradication because of its damage on the ecosystem.

== Name ==
Mystery Bay takes its name from the mysterious disappearance of five men in 1880. A boat, in which geological surveyor, Lamont Young, his friend and botanist, Louis Schneider, and three boatman had been using to reach the Montreal goldfield, was found holed and abandoned there, together with some food supplies and a few personal effects. The nature of the holes in the boat were suspicious. No other traces of the men were ever found. A memorial records the event.

== Flora ==
Mystery Bay and its surrounding area contain many different types of flora and has a Coastal wattle called Acacia Sophorae that has drawn attention due to its rapid spread. The spread of this wattle is causing concern for the area.

Mystery Bay holds many different types of beaches that front the Tasman Sea. Some beaches are surfing beaches, others are swimming beaches, and many of these beaches contain spectacular large rocks. At low tide, these rocks become rock pools. The rocks and sedimentation of these beaches along the Coastline of Mystery Bay show that there is evidence of tsunami destruction. The area today is still popular amongst the Indigenous community for fishing and camping.

== Evidence of tsunamis ==
There has been evidence of historical tsunamis along the Central South Coast of NSW, including Mystery Bay. Mystery Bay contains the most prominent evidence of tsunami destruction, with many misplaced rocks and sediment.

Tsunami destruction evidence within NSW is common around coast areas. In 2006, research was conducted and found that there were approximately 44 tsunamis in NSW dating from 105,000 years ago. One of these was the Chilean tsunami of 1960, caused by an earthquake on the south coast of Chile, which affected Victoria, Queensland and the north coast of New South Wales.

== Nearby attractions ==
=== Eurobodalla National Park ===
The Eurobodalla National Park is home to the white-bellied sea eagle (Haliaeetus leucogaster).

Another type of bird found locally within the area of Eurobodalla National Park is the Australian pelican, also known as Pelecanus conspicillatus. This bird is found in many places throughout Australia and the Pacific island countries. It prefers coastal areas near fresh water such as lakes, swamps, rivers, and coastal areas. The pelican prefers being mobile and can reach heights of 3000m and speeds of approximately 56 km/h.

=== Montague Island ===
Barunguba / Montague Island is home to wildlife with its penguins (Eudyptula minor) and fur seals. It is home to many penguins due to changes caused by human settlement in the area since 1982. The breeding quantities of these penguins have dramatically increased due to vegetational changes. There are many colonies of Eudyptula minor throughout Australia, mainly within the coastal regions including the East coast where Montague island is. There are more colonies on the south coast of Australia because there is more breeding within lower latitudes.

There is also a large population on Montague island of a specific type of house mouse (Mus musculus). In recent years the population of the mouse has become out of control and methods of eradication were needed. The mice have been found to impact the vegetational system of the island by eating seeds, and other negative effects are unknown. Scientists have predicted the damage to the area by reviewing other islands with similar infestations of mice. They discovered that mice on other islands caused damage to animal and plant species. The mice consumed lizards and many plant seeds which damaged the nature cycle of the ecosystem.

== Flora ==
Mystery Bay and the surrounding area consist of many species of native flora. Particular attention has been made to a specific coastal wattle called Acacia sophorae. This flower is native to the region of Mystery Bay and is most commonly found within Eurobodalla National Park. In recent years, there has been an increase in the number of flowers in the area due to certain ecological processes. A suspected reason that the flower has begun to invade the area is that there has been an excluding of grazing stock. There is concern that the flower will take over and reduce the population of other flowers in the area. The recovery of this concern is unknown but potentially possible within future years.

Acacia sophorae is mainly native to the area on the southeastern coast of Australia. This wattle is a prominent part of the forests and bushland within this area. It is also native to the surrounding area as well. In recent years a specific type of mildew has been spotted on the leaves of the wattle scrub. This powdery mildew was found to be an infection found with the species of Acacia sophorae and other species native to the area. A study was conducted by testing the mildew on the leaves and found overseas influences. The scientists discovered the infection was caused by overseas pathogens.

Weeds along the coastline of Australia have become a large issue with little possible eradication. Currently, the Australian government has issued a 30 million dollar investment for the eradication of these weeds. The threats of these weeds in coastal areas include reduced stability of dunes, the extinction of animals, and the destruction of coastal towns.

Montague Island is close to Mystery Bay and contains many different species of flora. Since 1932, the number of plant species has been recorded, and there have been found to be over 200 different species of plants. The number of plant species has decreased since 1932 as it was found only 140 still remain when the area since it was examined in the late 1990s. The number has decreased since the 90’s however many still remain. Most of the species that have become extinct from Montague Island were weeds.

There were problems during the 1980s with regard to goats affecting the vegetation on Montague Island\. Goats have always been present on Montague Island for many years. During the 1980s the number of goats on the island dramatically increased to almost double. Goats have significant effects on much of the vegetation on the island. Certain plant species that were known to invade agriculture were becoming more prominent since the goat number increased. One of the plant species invading the area was Pennisetum clandestinum. This species has been invading the area in large quantities since the 1980s. This affected the surroundings areas and existing plants and scrubs that were present within the area. The plant has taken over one-third of the entire island.

== Aboriginal history ==
Aboriginal Australians inhabited the area for millennia before the colonisation of Australia, but there are few Aboriginal residents living in Mystery Bay in recent times.

Camping and fishing are very popular activities amongst the Aboriginal community at Mystery bay. The area contains many Dreamtime stories. Aboriginal people camping within Mystery Bay and Eurobodalla National Park area prefer to live off the environment. They follow their own guidance through dreaming tracks created during the Dreamtime. Multiple tracks are spread throughout the area, used for gathering food from the coast and meeting at different campsites.
