= The Mountains Have a Secret =

1948 novel by Australian writer Arthur Upfield

- Author: Arthur Upfield
- Language: English
- Series: Detective Inspector Napoleon 'Bony' Bonaparte
- Genre: Fiction
- Publisher: Doubleday
- Publication date: 1948
- Publication place: Australia
- Media type: Print
- Pages: 187 pp
- Preceded by: An Author Bites the Dust
- Followed by: The Widows of Broome

The Mountains Have a Secret (1948) is a novel by Australian writer Arthur Upfield. It is the twelfth of the author's novels to feature his recurring character Detective Inspector Napoleon 'Bony' Bonaparte. It was originally published in USA by Doubleday in 1948 under their Crime Club imprint.

== Abstract ==
After two young girls disappear near the Baden Park Hotel, a police officer investigating their disappearance is murdered. Napoleon Bonaparte is called in to help solve the mystery.

== Location ==
Set mostly in the Grampians mountain range in western Victoria.

== Publishing history ==
Following the book's initial publication by Doubleday in 1948 it was subsequently published as follows:

- Heinemann, UK and Australia, 1952
- Angus and Robertson, Australia, 1991

and subsequent paperback, ebook and audio book editions.

The novel was also translated into Danish and Spanish in 1957, German in 1990, and French in 1997.

== Critical reception ==
Writing for the Western Mail (Perth) a reviewer found that Upfield "provides the reader with an extraordinary end to the story—quite unsuspected and rather startling.

"To dwell too long on this aspect of the book is unfair to the author and his purpose! Some readers will be delighted at the final sequences; many will feel that they might be much too far-fetched even for thrillers which are allowed a great deal of latitude.

"Whether the ending is acceptable or not does not matter. The book is well up to the standard of all the Napoleon Bonaparte stories and better than most."

== See also ==
- 1948 in Australian literature
