= The Devil's Steps =

1946 novel by Australian writer Arthur Upfield

- Author: Arthur Upfield
- Language: English
- Series: Detective Inspector Napoleon 'Bony' Bonaparte
- Genre: Fiction
- Publisher: Doubleday Books
- Publication date: 1946
- Publication place: Australia
- Media type: Print
- Pages: 285 pp
- Preceded by: Death of a Swagman
- Followed by: An Author Bites the Dust

The Devil's Steps (1946) is a novel by Australian writer Arthur Upfield. It is the tenth of the author's novels to feature his recurring character Detective Inspector Napoleon 'Bony' Bonaparte. It was originally published in USA by Doubleday Books in 1946.

It was also serialised in The Argus from 16 November to 24 December 1946 in two instalments each week, one in the Saturday supplement, the Argus Week-End Magazine, the next in the Wednesday supplement, the Argus Woman's Magazine.

== Abstract ==
At Wideview Chalet, a guest house in Victoria's Dandenong Ranges, the body of Grumman is found in the gutter outside the building. Detective-Inspector Bonaparte has been seconded to the Army for special intelligence work and had been watching Grumman, who is, in reality, a member of the German General Staff. When the local constable is shot dead by a visitor to Grumman, Bony is asked to help the civil police solve the murders.

== Location ==
Set in a fictional mountain resort called Mount Chalmers, similar to the Dandenong Ranges on the eastern edge of Melbourne, Victoria (most probably in the vicinity of Mt Dandenong, but with some similarities to One Tree Hill in Ferny Creek), and also in Melbourne City and its suburbs South Yarra and Coburg.

== Publishing history ==
Following the book's initial publication by Doubleday Books in 1945 it was subsequently published as follows:

- American Reprint, US, 1946
- Francis Aldor, UK, 1948
- Angus & Robertson, Australia, 1965

and subsequent paperback, ebook and audio book editions.

The novel was also translated into German in 1994.

== Television adaptation ==
This novel was adapted for television as Boney and the Devil's Steps (1973), from a screenplay by Joy Cavill, and directed by Ron Way : Fauna Productions.

== See also ==
- 1946 in Australian literature
