= Coastal wattle =

Coastal wattle is a common name for several plants and may refer to:

- Acacia cyclops, native to Australia
- Acacia sophorae, native to southeastern Australia
