= Robert Menzies (actor) =

Australian actor (born 1955)

Robert Menzies (born 4 November 1955) is an Australian actor, who is best known for starring in Three Dollars. Menzies was nominated as Best Lead Actor in Television Drama in the 2009 AFI Awards for Television for his acting in the ABC TV production of 3 Acts of Murder.

He is the grandson of former Australian Prime Minister Sir Robert Menzies and his wife, Dame Pattie Menzies.

In 2024, Menzies appeared as King Lear in Bell Shakespeare's production of King Lear.

== Filmography ==
=== Film ===
Year	Title	Role	Notes
1982	Heatwave	Student	
1985	Bliss	Damien	
1986	Cactus	Robert	Feature film
1988	Tender Hooks	Yawn	
1990	Golden Braid	Ernst	
1991	Stan and George's New Life	Gerald	
1992	The Nun and the Bandit	Richard	
1995	Dad and Dave: On Our Selection	Cranky Jack	Feature film
1996	Lust and Revenge	Psych	
1997	Oscar and Lucinda	Abel	
1999	Siam Sunset	Eric	
2000	Muggers	Alvin	
2000	Innocence	David	Feature film
2002	Lamb	The father	Short
2003	Horseplay	Seamus	
2004	Under the Radar	Ched	Feature film
2004	Floodhouse	Harry	
2005	Three Dollars	Nick	Feature film
2006	Opal Dream	Humph	
2006	Snow	Man	Short
2009	Lucky Country	The Rabbiter	Feature film
2009	Smash Cut	Crowd Member	
2013	Canopy	Older Jim	
2014	The End of the Earth	Pilgrim	Short
2015	The Daughter	Taxi Driver	
2015	Force of Destiny	Doctor	
2016	Halfbeard	Shopkeeper	Short
2017	A Terrible Beauty	John	Short
2021	Little Tornadoes	Jim	
2023	The Rooster	Mr Poulson	

=== Television ===
Year	Title	Role	Notes	Ref
1979	The Young Doctors	Carl	1 episode	
1980-81	Cop Shop	Bill / Trevor	4 episodes	
1981	A Step in the Right Direction		TV movie	
1988	The Dirtwater Dynasty	Richie Eastwick	5 episodes	
1988	Westward Ho!		TV movie	
1991	The Flying Doctors	Colin	1 episode	
1994	Wedlocked	Carl	4 episodes	
1996	Mercury	Peter	1 episode	
1997	State Cornoner	Terry	1 episode	
1998	Good Guys Bad Guys	Leo	1 episode	
2000	Dogwoman	Jim Morgan	TV movie	
2001	My Brother Jack	Gavin	TV movie	
2001	Stingers	Kevin Mason	1 episode	
2002	The Secret Life of Us	Mr Vedder	2 episodes	
2002	MDA	Iain West	2 episodes	
1997-06	Blue Heelers	Various	4 episodes	
2006	The Society Murders	Paul Gallaby	TV film	
2007-08	Satisfaction	Alden	2 episodes	
2008	Monash: The Forgotten Anzac	John Monash	TV film	
2009	3 Acts of Murder	Arthur Upfield	TV film	
2010	City Homicide	James Boyd	1 episode	
2011	Cop Hard	King Cowboy	1 episode	
2014	The Doctor Blake Mysteries	Mr Michaels	1 episode	
2015	The Beautiful Lie	Phillip Ballantyne	TV miniseries	
2017-19	Glitch	Pete Rennox	TV series	
2018	Jack Irish	Dr Greaves	4 episodes	
2021	The Orchard	Ewen Evans	Podcast series	
2021	The Newsreader	Olive	1 episode	

== Theatre ==
Year	Title	Role	Notes	Ref
1999	Betrayal		Sydney Theatre Company	
2023	Flake	Bob	Red Stitch	
2024	King Lear	King Lear	Sydney Theatre Co	
