= Murder Must Wait =

1953 novel by Australian writer Arthur Upfield

- Author: Arthur Upfield
- Language: English
- Series: Detective Inspector Napoleon 'Bony' Bonaparte
- Genre: Fiction
- Publisher: Doubleday
- Publication date: 1953
- Publication place: Australia
- Media type: Print
- Pages: 190 pp
- Preceded by: Venom House
- Followed by: Death of a Lake

Murder Must Wait (1953) is a novel by Australian writer Arthur Upfield. It is the seventeenth of the author's novels to feature his recurring character Detective Inspector Napoleon 'Bony' Bonaparte. It was originally published in USA by Doubleday in 1953 under their Crime Club imprint.

== Abstract ==
"Infants are disappearing from a Riverina town, and it strikes the investigating Detective-Inspector Bonaparte that they have all been children of neglectful parents: party-givers, lady novelists (Trollope's mother wrote her family out of debt), ladies'-parlor drinkers and just plain unwanting mothers. With the aid of a young policewoman the half-black detective investigates bank-managers, estate-agents, doctors, ageing ethnologists and a mission for aborigines outside the town."

== Location ==
The action of the novel is set in and around "Mitford", New South Wales, which is approximately where real-life Wentworth is located. Various references within the novel also indicate far west of New South Wales.

== Publishing history ==
Following the book's initial publication by Doubleday in 1953 it was subsequently published as follows:

- 1953 Heinemann, UK and Australia
- 1954 Argus newspaper, serialisation
- 1958 Pan Books, UK
- 1963 Berkeley Books, USA
- 1971 Heinemann, UK
- 1978 Aoenian Press, USA
- 1984 Angus and Robertson, Australia
- 1987 Collier Books, USA
- 1999 Amereon House, USA

and subsequent paperback, ebook and audio book editions.

The novel was also translated into German in 1953, Spanish in 1957, Japanese in 1959, Swedish in 1976, Slovakian in 1988, and French in 1997.

== Critical reception ==
A reviewer in The Bulletin noted: "The detecting in this novel is mildly meritorious, and the solution of its many-sided perplexities is satisfying and surprising."

The Sydney Morning Herald stated of "Bony" and this novel that this "is Australia's only detective in regular fictional employment at his vain, arrogant, quirky, competent best."

== Television adaptation ==
The novel was adapted for television in 1973 in a one-hour episode, titled "Boney and the Emu Man", of the Boney series. It was directed by Federico Chentrens, from a script by Joyce Belfrage.

== See also ==
- 1953 in Australian literature
