= Bernice Carey =

American writer (1911–1990)

- Born: 1911
- Died: February 8, 1990 (aged 78–79); Santa Clara, California
- Other name: Bernice Carey Martin
- Occupation: Writer
- Children: 2

Bernice Carey (1911 – February 8, 1990) was an American writer of mystery novels, short plays, and articles. Her works of crime fiction, written in the late 1940s to mid-1950s, appeared in English, and some of them were also published in French, Spanish, and Swedish.

== Bibliography ==
- The Reluctant Murderer (1949)
- The Body on the Sidewalk (1950)
- The Man Who Got Away With It (1950)
- The Beautiful Stranger (1951)
- The Missing Heiress (1952)
- The Three Widows (1952)
- Their Nearest and Dearest (1953)
- The Frightened Widow (1953)
- The Fatal Picnic (1955)
