= 1929 in Australian literature =

This article presents a list of the historical events and publications of Australian literature during 1929.

== Books ==
- Arthur H. Adams – A Man's Life
- Martin Boyd – Dearest Idol
- Dorothy Cottrell – The Singing Gold
- Bernard Cronin
  - Bracken
  - Toad
- Jean Devanny – Riven
- M. Barnard Eldershaw – A House is Built
- Mabel Forrest – White Witches
- Arthur Gask – The Lonely House
- Mary Gaunt – The Lawless Frontier
- Norman Lindsay – Madam Life's Lovers : A Human Narrative Embodying a Philosophy of the Artist in Dialogue Form
- Jack McLaren – A Diver Went Down
- Frederic Manning – The Middle Parts of Fortune : Somme and Ancre, 1916
- Myra Morris – Enchantment
- Katharine Susannah Prichard – Coonardoo
- Henry Handel Richardson – Ultima Thule
- Alice Grant Rosman – Visitors to Hugo
- Arthur W. Upfield – The Barrakee Mystery

== Short stories ==
- Dulcie Deamer – As It Was in the Beginning
- Vance Palmer
  - "Ancestors"
  - "Jettisoned"
- Henry Handel Richardson – "The Bath"
- David Unaipon – Native Legends

== Children's and Young Adult fiction ==
- Mary Grant Bruce – The Happy Traveller
- May Gibbs – Bib and Bub in Gumnut Town
- Lilian Turner – Lady Billie

== Poetry ==
- Ruth Bedford – Fairies and Fancies
- Furnley Maurice – The Gully and Other Verses
- Myra Morris – White Magic
- John Shaw Neilson – "The Whistling Jack"
- Kenneth Slessor
  - "Cucumber Kitty"
  - "Snowdrops"

== Drama ==
- Betty Roland – Morning

== Non-fiction ==
- Alec H. Chisholm – Birds and Green Places : A Book of Australian Nature Gossip

== Awards and honours ==
=== Literary ===
Award	Author	Title	Publisher
ALS Gold Medal	Henry Handel Richardson	Ultima Thule	Heinemann
The Bulletin Prize	Vance Palmer	The Passage	Stanley Paul

== Births ==
A list, ordered by date of birth (and, if the date is either unspecified or repeated, ordered alphabetically by surname) of births in 1929 of Australian literary figures, authors of written works or literature-related individuals follows, including year of death.

- 5 January – Veronica Brady, poet and critic (died 2015)
- 1 February – R. A. Simpson, poet (died 2002)
- 16 February – Peter Porter, poet (died 2010)
- 26 March – David Lake, science fiction novelist (born in India)(died 2016)
- 2 April – Catherine Gaskin, novelist (born in Ireland)(died 2009)
- 14 April – Ray Mathew, novelist, poet and dramatist (died 2002)
- 5 May – Kenneth Cook, novelist (died 1987)
- 7 October – Ken Inglis, historian (died 2017)
- 11 December – Desmond O'Grady, novelist and short story writer (died 2021 in Italy)

== Deaths ==
A list, ordered by date of death (and, if the date is either unspecified or repeated, ordered alphabetically by surname) of deaths in 1929 of Australian literary figures, authors of written works or literature-related individuals follows, including year of birth.

- 27 February — Lala Fisher, poet, writer and editor (born 1872)
- 28 May – Barbara Baynton, novelist and short story writer (born 1857)
- 8 June – Laura Palmer-Archer, short story writer, wrote as Bushwoman (born 1864)

== See also ==
- 1929 in Australia
- 1929 in literature
- 1929 in poetry
- List of years in Australian literature
- List of years in literature
