= 1928 in Australian literature =

This article presents a list of the historical events and publications of Australian literature during 1928.

== Events ==
- The Australian Literature Society Gold Medal (ALS Gold Medal) is awarded for the first time.
- The Bulletin Prize is awarded for the first time.

== Books ==
- Martin Boyd – The Montforts (aka The Madeleine Heritage)
- Bernard Cronin – Dragonfly
- Jean Devanny – Dawn Beloved
- Mabel Forrest – Reaping Roses
- Miles Franklin – Up the Country
- Jack McLaren – Sun Man
- Vance Palmer – The Man Hamilton
- Alice Grant Rosman
  - The Back Seat Driver
  - The Window
- Nevil Shute – So Disdained
- Arthur W. Upfield – The House of Cain

== Short stories ==
- Nettie Palmer – An Australian Story-Book (edited)
- Katharine Susannah Prichard
  - "The Cow"
  - "White Kid Gloves"

== Poetry ==
- John Le Gay Brereton – Swags Up!
- George Essex Evans – The Collected Verse of G. Essex Evans
- Leon Gellert
  - "At Anzac"
  - "Rendezvous"
- Mary Gilmore – "The Gordon Fox!"
- Kenneth Slessor
  - "The All-Night Taxi Stand"
  - "Choker's Lane"
  - "Earth-Visitors (to N. L.)"
  - "Up in Mabel's Room"

== Children's and Young Adult fiction ==
- Ethel Turner – Judy and Punch
- Lilian Turner – Ann Chooses Glory

== Drama ==
- Betty Roland – The Touch of Silk

== Awards and honours ==
=== Literary ===
Award	Author	Title	Publisher
ALS Gold Medal	Martin Boyd	The Montforts	Constable
The Bulletin Prize	M. Barnard Eldershaw	A House is Built	
The Bulletin Prize	Katharine Susannah Prichard	Coonardoo	

== Births ==
A list, ordered by date of birth (and, if the date is either unspecified or repeated, ordered alphabetically by surname) of births in 1928 of Australian literary figures, authors of written works or literature-related individuals follows, including year of death.

- 8 February – Elizabeth Harrower, novelist (died 2020)
- 14 February – Bruce Beaver, poet (died 2004)
- 13 March – Bob Brissenden, poet, novelist, critic and academic (died 1991)
- 5 May – Kit Denton, novelist (died 1997)
- 18 June – Michael Blakemore, actor, writer and theatre director (died 2023)
- 21 October – Eleanor Spence, writer for children (died 2008)
- 22 December – Barbara Blackman, writer, essayist, poet, librettist, broadcaster and philanthropist (died 2024)

Unknown date

- Anne Fairbairn, poet, journalist and expert in Arab culture (died 2018)

== Deaths ==
A list, ordered by date of death (and, if the date is either unspecified or repeated, ordered alphabetically by surname) of deaths in 1928 of Australian literary figures, authors of written works or literature-related individuals follows, including year of birth.

- 5 February – David McKee Wright, poet (born 1869)
- 19 August – Thomas William Heney, journalist and poet (born 1862)
- 20 October – Edward Booth Loughran, journalist and poet (born 1850 in Glasgow, Scotland)

== See also ==
- 1928 in Australia
- 1928 in literature
- 1928 in poetry
- List of years in Australian literature
- List of years in literature
