= The Bulletin Prize =

Annual literary award in Australia

The Bulletin Prize was a novel competition organised and run by The Bulletin magazine. The first prize was awarded in 1928 and the last in 1929, after which it was superseded by the S. H. Prior Memorial Prize.

== Announcement ==
The prize was announced by S. H. Prior, the editor of the magazine's "Red Page", on 18 August 1927 with the following introduction: "This country, rich in short stories, is suffering and always has suffered from a great dearth of full-length Australian novels. The book-stores and -stalls are in consequence overflowing with novels written and published elsewhere, and too often advertising some other country.

"'The Bulletin,' which has been responsible for popularising the short story in Australia, and has created a school of short-story writers, realises that, the time has come when something should be done for the long story and the long-story writer. It therefore announces a competition with prizes so substantial that it believes the very best of which Australia is capable will be forthcoming."

The prizemoney was announced as being a minimum of £1700, with First Prize being worth £500, Second Prize £125, and Third Prize £75. The deadline for the first competition was set as June 30, 1928, and it was noted that further competitions would be held in following years.

The prize-winning stories would be available for serialisation in with "The Bulletin" or "The Australian Women's Mirror" and the competition would only be open to writers from Australia, New Zealand or the South Pacific. The stories must be original and have not be published previously.

"The Red Page" of The Bulletin followed up the original announcement with further details on 1 September 1927 when it was specified that "Every story for competition must be submitted under a nom de plume; and the name and address of the writer, with the nom de plume, must accompany it in a sealed envelope, which will not be opened until after the stories have been judged." At that time the details of the judges had not been decided but that there would "probably be five, including the Editors of The Bulletin and the Woman’s Mirror; and the A.J.A. (Australian Journalists’ Association) will be invited to nominate one."

== Response ==
The first response to the Prize occurred on 17 November 1927 when O. N. Gillespie, a New Zealand writer in the magazine's "Red Page", after noting the "incredulity" with which any statement about the quality of Australian and New Zealand literature would be met in England, stated "that the entrants for The Bulletin prize novel should dedicate themselves to the task of writing a book to shatter, explode or at any rate disturb this mass of serene ignorance."

Gillespie then went on to note that "Three kinds of novels should be barred", namely, books about "Westralia, Northern Territory or Burwood", novels about convict life, and anything to do with gold-digging.

== Prize winners ==
Year	Rank	Author	Title
1928	1	M. Barnard Eldershaw	A House is Built
1928	1	Katharine Susannah Prichard	Coonardoo
1928	3	Vance Palmer	Men Are Human
1929	1	Vance Palmer	The Passage
1929	2	K. G. Taylor	Wards of the Outer March
1929	3	J. J. Hardie	Cattle Camp

== Highly Commended and Commended works ==
- 1928
- 1929
