= 1940 in Australian literature =

This article presents a list of the historical events and publications of Australian literature during 1940.

== Events ==
- Meanjin magazine publishes its first issue in Brisbane.

== Novels ==
- E. C. Allen – Old Eugowra
- Martin Boyd – Nuns in Jeopardy
- Roy Connolly – Southern Saga
- Dulcie Deamer – Holiday
- Arthur Gask
  - The House on the Fens
  - The Tragedy of the Silver Moon
- Michael Innes
  - The Secret Vanguard
  - There Came Both Mist and Snow
- Josephine Knowles – Leaves in the Wind
- Will Lawson – Red Morgan Rides
- Eric Lowe – Framed in Hardwood
- Nevil Shute
  - Landfall: A Channel Story
  - An Old Captivity
- Helen Simpson – Maid No More
- Christina Stead – The Man Who Loved Children
- F. J. Thwaites – Whispers in Tahiti
- Arthur Upfield – Bushranger of the Skies
- Rix Weaver – Behold New Holland

== Short stories ==
- Gavin Casey – "The Day at the Brown Lakes"
- Frank Dalby Davison – The Woman at the Mill
- Alan Marshall – "Tell Us About the Turkey, Jo"

== Children's ==
- Mary Grant Bruce – Peter & Co.
- May Gibbs – The Complete Adventures of Snugglepot and Cuddlepie
- P. L. Travers – Happy Ever After
- Dorothy Wall – Blinky Bill Joins the Army

== Poetry ==
- Mary Gilmore – "No Foe Shall Gather Our Harvest"
- Max Harris – The Gift of Blood
- Eve Langley – "Native-Born"
- Ian Mudie – Corroboree to the Sun
- Roderic Quinn – "Tyrrell's Bookshop"
- Kenneth Slessor – "Metempsychosis"
- Douglas Stewart – Elegy for an Airman

== Non-Fiction ==
- Malcolm Uren – Sailormen's Ghosts (travel and history)

== Drama ==
=== Radio ===
- Vance Palmer
  - The Dingo
  - The Interloper

=== Theatre ===
- Sumner Locke Elliott – The Little Sheep Run Fast

== Awards and honours ==
=== Literary ===
Award	Author	Title	Publisher
ALS Gold Medal	William Baylebridge	This Vital Flesh	Tallabila Press

== Births ==
A list, ordered by date of birth (and, if the date is either unspecified or repeated, ordered alphabetically by surname) of births in 1940 of Australian literary figures, authors of written works or literature-related individuals follows, including year of death.

- 9 February – J. M. Coetzee, novelist (born South Africa)
- 19 March – Andrew Taylor, poet
- 12 April – Jack Hibberd, playwright and novelist (died 2024)
- 16 April – Marion Halligan, novelist (died 2024)
- 28 July – Geoffrey Lehmann, poet and writer for children
- 7 July – Geoff Page, poet
- 18 August – Jan Owen, poet
- 16 October – Ron Pretty, poet (died 2023)
- 10 November – Jill Roe, historian (died 2017)
- 16 November – Craig Powell, poet (died 2022)

Unknown date

- Carmel Bird, novelist
- Rosaleen Love, critic and short story writer

== Deaths ==
A list, ordered by date of death (and, if the date is either unspecified or repeated, ordered alphabetically by surname) of deaths in 1940 of Australian literary figures, authors of written works or literature-related individuals follows, including year of birth.

- 27 March – K. Langloh Parker, author (born 1856)
- 3 May – S. Elliott Napier, poet and journalist (born 1870)

== See also ==
- 1940 in Australia
- 1940 in literature
- 1940 in poetry
- List of years in Australian literature
- List of years in literature
