= 1930 in Australian literature =

This article presents a list of the historical events and publications of Australian literature during 1930.

== Books ==
- Marie Bjelke-Petersen – Monsoon Music
- Jean Devanny
  - Bushman Burke
  - Devil Made Saint
- Miles Franklin – Ten Creeks Run : A Tale of the Horse and Cattle Stations of the Murrumbidgee
- Arthur Gask – The Shadow of Larose
- Mary Gaunt – Joan of the Pilchard
- Norman Lindsay – Redheap
- Lennie Lower – Here's Luck
- Vance Palmer
  - Men are Human
  - The Passage
- Katharine Susannah Prichard – Haxby's Circus : The Lightest, Brightest Little Show on Earth
- Alice Grant Rosman – The Young and Secret
- F. J. Thwaites – The Broken Melody
- E. V. Timms – The Cripple in Black
- Arthur W. Upfield – The Beach of Atonement

== Young Adult ==
- Alice Grant Rosman – Jock the Scot
- Lilian Turner – There Came a Call

== Poetry ==
- Minnie Agnes Filson – Rhymes & Whimsies
- Mary Gilmore – The Wild Swan : Poems
- S. Elliott Napier – Potted Biographies
- John Shaw Neilson – "The Uneven Player"
- Kenneth Slessor – "Gardens in the Sky"

== Drama ==
=== Radio ===
- Max Afford – The Clock Strikes Twelve

=== Theatre ===
- Louis Esson – The Quest : A Dramatic Legend in Six Scenes

== Awards and honours ==
=== Literary ===
| Award | Author | Title | Publisher |
|---|---|---|---|
| ALS Gold Medal | Vance Palmer | The Passage | Stanley Paul |

== Births ==
A list, ordered by date of birth (and, if the date is either unspecified or repeated, ordered alphabetically by surname) of births in 1930 of Australian literary figures, authors of written works or literature-related individuals follows, including year of death.

- 15 February – Bruce Dawe, poet (died 2020)
- 11 March – Geoffrey Blainey, historian
- 13 March – Noela Young, children's writer and book illustrator (died 2018)
- 21 May – Malcolm Fraser, politician and author (died 2015)
- 19 June – Anne Deveson, author (born in Kuala Lumpur, Malaysia)(died 2016)
- 23 July – Vivienne Rae-Ellis, author (died 2015, in England)
- 13 August – John McKellar, playwright (died 2010)
- 25 November – Brenda Niall, biographer

Unknown date

- Mena Kasmiri Abdullah, short story writer
- Gavin Greenlees, poet (died 1983)

== Deaths ==
A list, ordered by date of death (and, if the date is either unspecified or repeated, ordered alphabetically by surname) of deaths in 1930 of Australian literary figures, authors of written works or literature-related individuals follows, including year of birth.

- 13 January – Robert Crawford, poet (born 1868)
- 28 March – Jean Curlewis, novelist (born 1898)
- 2 September – Archibald Strong, poet (born 1876)
- 25 September – Arthur Way, classical scholar, translator and headmaster (born 1847)

== See also ==
- 1930 in Australia
- 1930 in literature
- 1930 in poetry
- List of years in Australian literature
- List of years in literature
