= Flora Eldershaw =

Australian novelist, critic and historian

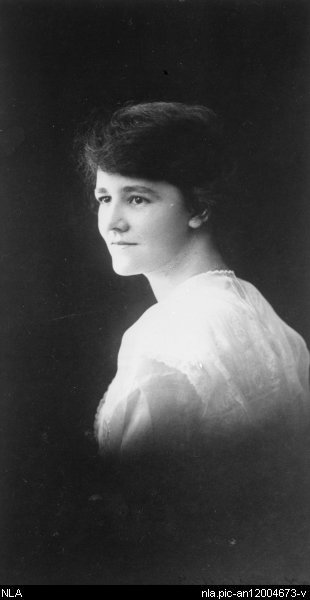
- Flora Eldershaw, c. 1915
- Born: 16 March 1897; Darlinghurst, Sydney
- Died: 20 September 1956 (aged 59); Wagga Wagga, New South Wales
- Occupations: Novelist, critic, historian

Flora Sydney Patricia Eldershaw (16 March 1897 – 20 September 1956) was an Australian novelist, critic and historian. With Marjorie Barnard she formed the writing collaboration known as M. Barnard Eldershaw. She was also a teacher and later a public servant.

Eldershaw was active in Australian literary circles, including becoming the first woman President of the Fellowship of Australian Writers and being a long-time member of the Advisory Board of the Commonwealth Literary Fund. For both her writing output and her active support for and promotion of writers, Eldershaw made a significant contribution to Australian literary life.

== Life ==
Eldershaw was born in Sydney but grew up in the Riverina district of country New South Wales. She was the fifth of eight children born to Henry Sirdefield Eldershaw, a station manager, and Margaret (née McCarroll). She attended boarding school at Mount Erin Convent in Wagga Wagga.

After school, she studied history and Latin at the University of Sydney where she met Marjorie Barnard with whom she later formed a writing collaboration, under the name M. Barnard Eldershaw. She worked as a teacher, first at Cremorne Church of England Grammar and then, from 1923, at Presbyterian Ladies' College, Croydon, where she became senior English mistress and head of the boarding school. According to Dever, her Catholic education precluded her becoming headmistress. In 1941, she moved to Canberra to take up a government position, transferring to Melbourne in 1943 where she worked for the Department of Labour and National Service. In 1948 she started working as a private consultant in industrial matters such as women's legal rights and equal pay, and extending her interests into the welfare of Aboriginal and migrant women.

Like many women writers of the time, she had to work to support her writing activities. Like them too, she faced difficulties about where to live. For a time she lived as a resident mistress at the Presbyterian Ladies' College, but came to hate the restrictions this entailed. Barnard, herself living under the restrictions of home, described Eldershaw's situation as "untenable". In 1936 Eldershaw and Barnard rented a small flat in Potts Point where they could give small dinner parties and to which they could retreat from school and home. In 1938 she moved out of school completely into a better flat in Kings Cross. During this time, these flats operated as something like a literary salon, as it was here that Eldershaw and Barnard were able to entertain many of their literary peers.

Like Barnard, she never married. As her health failed due to "years of overwork and financial worries", she went to her sister's place in 1955. Ironically, she was granted one of the literary pensions she had fought hard to establish a decade earlier. She died in hospital of a cerebral thrombosis in 1956.

== Literary career ==
Eldershaw was a leading figure in Sydney literary circles, becoming, in 1935, the first woman president of the Fellowship of Australian Writers (FAW), a position she held again in 1943. As Dever writes, "With Barnard and Frank Dalby Davison, she developed policies on political and cultural issues, and helped to transform the F.A.W. into a vocal and sometimes controversial lobby group". Through the late 1930s, these three were known as "the triumvirate". Besides these two, her literary associates included Vance and Nettie Palmer, Katharine Susannah Prichard, Judah Waten and Tom Inglis Moore.

It is well recognised that during the interwar years in Australia "women represented a significant section of the writing community", that, in fact, this concentration "could be said to be one of the major distinguishing features of the then Australian literary landscape". Women, including Eldershaw, were significant in the reviewing community, held office in major literary societies, judged literary competitions and edited anthologies.

Eldershaw actively promoted the needs of writers and in 1938 helped persuade the Commonwealth Literary Fund (CLF) to include grants and pensions for writers, and funding for university lectures on Australian literature. She was a member of the CLF from 1939 to 1953. In much of this more political, advocacy work she was often the only woman present. She was known to Australian politicians like H. V. Evatt, Ben Chifley and Robert Menzies. Dever writes that Vance Palmer admired Eldershaw for "what he saw as her ability to neutralise conventional masculine expectation of the threat posed by women in 'public life'", though she suggests that he failed to recognise that she often achieved this by playing on men's expectations.

=== Collaboration ===
Her major fiction output was produced in collaboration with Marjorie Barnard. Their first novel, A House is Built (1929) shared first prize, with Katharine Susannah Prichard's Coonardoo, in the Bulletin novel competition. They wrote four other novels, the last being the censored utopian novel, published in 1947 as Tomorrow and Tomorrow, and reissued in its entirety in 1983 under its original title, Tomorrow and Tomorrow and Tomorrow (1947).

The collaboration, which lasted two decades, also produced histories, critical essays and lectures, and radio drama.

== Public Service career ==
Eldershaw left teaching, disillusioned, and obtained employment with the Department of Labour and National Service. She worked first in the Division of Post-War Reconstruction and then in the Division of Industrial Welfare. She developed some of Australia's first policies on industrial welfare and undertook comprehensive research into personnel practice in government munitions factories and private industry.

However, being unable to obtain permanent employment in the Public Service for health reasons, she found work as a private management consultant. This was to prove disastrous financially as her employer often didn't pay her.

== Politics ==
Politics was always an important aspect of her work. Realising that "to be involved in writing was to be involved in politics", she, Barnard and Davison worked hard through the Fellowship of Australian Writers to protect writers and the freedom of expression. She lobbied for writers to receive Federal government subsidies. The "salon" she and Barnard held in Sydney in the late 1930s hosted not only writers but also peace activists such as Lewis Rodd and Lloyd Ross.

During the war years, Eldershaw documented cases in which police raids on individuals and left-wing organisations resulted in the confiscation of property, arguing that writers must have "in their libraries all shades of opinion as tools of the trade". She strongly supported the FAW's pro-Soviet stance and, with Katharine Susannah Prichard, Miles Franklin and Frank Dalby Davison, was invited to speak at the Cultural Conference of the NSW Aid Russia Committee. As FAW President in 1943, she conveyed a message of support for Soviet writers to the Soviet Consul in Canberra.

Dever quotes Melbourne writer John Morrison as saying that Eldershaw was "socially and politically inclined to the left" and says that her pro-Soviet position and involvement in the Peace Movement resulted in her having "a slim if predictable ASIO file".

== Selected works ==
=== Fiction ===
==== As M. Barnard Eldershaw ====
- A House is Built (1929)
- Green Memory (1931)
- The Glasshouse (1936)
- Plaque with Laurel (1937)
- Tomorrow and Tomorrow and Tomorrow (1945)
- The Watch on the Headland (published in Australian Radio Plays, 1946)

=== Non-fiction and anthologies ===
==== As Flora Eldershaw ====
- Contemporary Australian Women Writers (1931)
- Australian Literary Society Medallists (1935)
- Australian Writers' Annual (1936, ed.)
- The Peaceful Army: A Memorial to the Pioneer Women of Australia, 1788-1938 (1938)

==== As M. Barnard Eldershaw ====
- Phillip of Australia: An Account of the Settlement of Sydney Cove, 1788-92 (1938)
- Essays in Australian Fiction (1938)
- The Life and Times of Captain George Piper (1939)
- My Australia (1939)
