= 1911 in Australian literature =

This article presents a list of the historical events and publications of Australian literature during 1911.

== Books ==
- Edward Dyson – Tommy the Hawker and Snifter his Boy
- Sumner Locke – Mum Dawson, 'Boss'
- Ambrose Pratt
  - Dan Kelly, Outlaw
  - The Outlaws of Weddin Range
- Louis Stone – Jonah
- Steele Rudd – The Book of Dan
- Lilian Turner – April Girls

== Short stories ==
- Randolph Bedford – Billy Pagan, Mining Engineer
- Edward Dyson
  - Benno and Some of the Push: Being Further 'Fact'ry 'Ands' Stories
  - The Golden Shanty
- Norman Lindsay – "Fatty Bennet"
- Thomas Edward Spencer – That Droll Lady: Being Further Adventures of Mrs. Bridget McSweeney

== Poetry ==
- E. J. Brady – Bells and Hobbles
- Christopher Brennan – "The Wanderer: 1902- : 95"
- Victor J. Daley
  - "A Ballad of Eureka"
  - Wine and Roses
- C.J. Dennis – "The Intro"
- Ella McFadyen – Outland Born and Other Verses
- Dorothea Mackellar – The Closed Door and Other Verses
- John Shaw Neilson
  - "The Green Singer"
  - "Love's Coming"
  - "To a Blue Flower"
- Marie E.J. Pitt – The Horses of the Hills and Other Verses

== Children's and young adults ==
- E. J. Brady – Tom Pagdin, Pirate
- Mary Grant Bruce – Mates at Billabong
- Ethel Turner – The Apple of Happiness

== Drama ==
- Edmund Duggan – My Mate, or a Bush Love Story
- Louis Esson – Three Short Plays

== Births ==
A list, ordered by date of birth (and, if the date is either unspecified or repeated, ordered alphabetically by surname) of births in 1911 of Australian literary figures, authors of written works or literature-related individuals follows, including year of death.

- 16 February – Hal Porter, poet and short story writer (died 1984)
- 1 March – Ian Mudie, poet (died 1976)
- 8 March – Eunice Hanger, playwright and educator (died 1972)
- 21 July – Cecily Crozier, artist, poet and literary editor who co-founded A Comment (died 2006)
- 27 July – Colin Roderick, editor and critic (died 2000)
- 29 July – Judah Waten, novelist (died 1985)
- 3 October — George Farwell, novelist (died 1976)
- 28 October – Clem Christesen, poet and literary editor (died 2003)
- 23 November – William Hart-Smith, poet (died 1990)
- 31 December – Dal Stivens, novelist (died 1997)

== Deaths ==
A list, ordered by date of death (and, if the date is either unspecified or repeated, ordered alphabetically by surname) of deaths in 1911 of Australian literary figures, authors of written works or literature-related individuals follows, including year of birth.

- 6 May – Thomas Edward Spencer, poet (born 1845)
- 5 October – Price Warung, short story writer (born 1855)

Unknown date:

- John Arthur Barry — short story writer (born 1850, Devon UK)
- Mary Fortune — poet, crime fiction and short story writer (born 1833)

== See also ==
- 1911 in Australia
- 1911 in literature
- 1911 in poetry
- List of years in Australian literature
- List of years in literature
