= Commonwealth Literary Fund =

The Commonwealth Literary Fund (CLF) was an Australian Government initiative founded in 1908 to assist needy Australian writers and their families. It was Federal Australia's first systematic support for the arts. Its scope was later broadened to encompass non-commercial literary projects.

== History ==
In 1908 the Deakin government established the fund, using Britain's Royal Literary Fund as a model, appointed a Committee and allocated £500 (equivalent to $79,000 in 2022) for grants for the first year. Its purpose was to provide a modest income for writers who were doing good work but had inadequate means to support themselves, and for widows and dependent families of writers who died destitute. A committee consisting of Sir Langdon Bonython, the Rev. E. H. Sugden, B.A., master of Queen's College, Melbourne University, and Professor Mungo McCallum, M.A., Challis Professor of Modern Literature at the University of Sydney, formed the committee which framed its regulations.

In 1939, the Fund, which had increased incrementally to £1500 (equivalent to $148,000 in 2022), was trebled by the Menzies government in response to agitation by the Fellowship of Australian Writers and ex-Prime Minister Jim Scullin. The scope of the Fund was broadened to grant fellowships to writers, and to provide guarantees against loss to Australian publishers of works approved by the committee. It also provided assistance to Australian literary magazines Meanjin, Overland, Quadrant and Southerly. The committee was replaced by a Board comprising the Prime Minister, the Leader of the Opposition and one other, with an advisory board comprising leading writers, publishers and academics, which in practice was responsible for all decisions and disbursements.

Membership of the advisory board was generally confined to older (mostly) male writers of long-established reputations: Grenfell Price, Vance Palmer, T. Inglis Moore, Douglas Stewart, Geoffrey Blainey, Kenneth Slessor, Flora Eldershaw and Kylie Tennant. Maurice Dunlevy, in his article for the Canberra Times, echoed Grenfell Price in saying that the Fund may have enabled works to be published which otherwise would not have been written, or would have been of lesser quality, and helped in the careers of a few great writers (Les A. Murray, David Ireland, Alex Buzo, William Marshall, H. M. Green, and Judith Wright), but much of the work produced was of mediocre quality, and no book sponsored by the Fund could be called a work of genius.

In 1973, by which time its budget had grown to $300,000 (equivalent to $3,182,000 in 2022), the functions of the CLF were taken over by the Literature Board, an arm of the Australia Council for the Arts.

== Sources ==
- Wilde, William H., Hooton, Joy and Andrews, Barry The Oxford Companion to Australian Literature Oxford University Press, Melbourne 2nd ed. ISBN 0 19 553381 X
