= The Watch on the Headland =

- Genre: play drama
- Running time: 30 mins (9:30 pm – 10:00 pm)
- Country of origin: Australia
- Language: English
- Syndicates: ABC
- Written by: M. Barnard Eldershaw
- Directed by: Charles Wheeler
- Original release: 26 January 1940

The Watch on the Headland is a 1940 Australian radio play by M. Barnard Eldershaw, the name for Marjorie Barnard and Flora Eldershaw. It was their first radio play.

The play is set on the South Head of Sydney Harbour two years after the foundation of the colony, in 1790. Characters include Captain Arthur Phillip, Watkin Tench, John Hunter and Midshipman Southwell.

The play won second prize in a 1940 ABC Radio Play Competition, which was won by George Farwell's Portrait of a Gentleman.

The play was well received and was produced again in 1943, 1949 and 1956. It was published in a 1946 collection of scripts, Australian Radio Plays.

== Reception ==
Leslie Rees called it "a slight play, a single incident of the earliest days of Sydney... It is a picture of the near-defeat of a community, of the hysteria, nostalgia, individual rebellion, resignation and steely withering self-control all called forth by a desperate occasion. Not a comfortable play, one sculptured out of cold marble, not perhaps taking a radio audience as such sufficiently into confidence, and seeming on the radio to end too precipitately — but the work of literary artists."

A biographer of the authors called the play "extremely effective. The vigorous dialogue is highly individualized, by character and dialect. The writers succeeded in bringing together in little space and at a dramatic moment a variety of First Fleeters with an equal variety of reactions to the colony’s dire predicament— and in flashing an understanding portrait of Phillip himself, most lonely, most sorely tried, and ultimately most renowned of all Australia’s early leaders."

Reviewing a 1940 radio production, "Jonathan" from Wireless Weekly said the writers "have produced a work of distinction without having recourse to any strong plot. They achieve results by means of distilled and unusual dialogue. A few words in this play would have become a page of script in less skilful hands... Acting, timing and production throughout were without fault."
