= M. Barnard Eldershaw =

Pseudonym used by Marjorie Barnard and Flora Eldershaw

M. Barnard Eldershaw was the pseudonym used by the twentieth-century Australian literary collaborators Marjorie Barnard (1897–1987) and Flora Eldershaw (1897–1956). In a collaboration that lasted two decades from the late 1920s to the late 1940s, they published 5 novels, 3 histories, a radio drama, a collection of short stories, and several collections of critical essays and lectures.

Flora Eldershaw and Marjorie Barnard were active in the Australian literary scene of the 1930s and 1940s. Through their lectures and reviews and their active participation in the Fellowship of Australian Writers, they played an important role in the development of Australia's "literary infrastructure".

== Collaborative life ==
Marjorie Barnard met Flora Eldershaw, who was a year ahead of her, in her first year at the University of Sydney. Marjorie Barnard wrote of their first meeting as being

[N]ot entirely happy. I was the greenest of green 'freshers'. Flora was established in her second year. Chance had given me the locker immediately above hers. Its untidy contents frequently spilled out into her more ordered domain. My then meager person was continually underfoot, and Flora's brown eyes flashed with indignation more often than they smiled. But within the year we were close friends. She widened my horizons and quickened my mind. Later this friendship was to withstand what everyone agrees to be the acid test of collaboration in writing.

While Marjorie Barnard spent most of the 1920s to 1940s living at home with her parents, Flora Eldershaw resided at the schools where she taught. Dale Spender writes that

"with so little encouragement, opportunity - or inclination, given the demands of the day - she [Marjorie Barnard] and Flora Eldershaw ... still managed to write their classic Australian novel A House is Built (1929), and another, Green Memory (1933)".

However, in 1936, when they were both thirty-nine, Barnard and Eldershaw also took a flat in Potts Point providing them with space for independence. Here, they held regular gatherings which operated something like a literary salon. Many of the leading literary and cultural figures of the time visited the flat. These included Frank Dalby Davison, Xavier Herbert, Leslie Rees, Tom Inglis Moore, Miles Franklin, Vance Palmer and Kylie Tennant.

Literature was not the only subject discussed at their "salon". Guests included peace activists such as Lewis Rodd and Lloyd Ross, and Frank Dalby Davison said that his pamphlet "While freedom lives" grew out of "social discussions at the M. Barnard Eldershaw salon".

Barnard and Eldershaw were not part of the Bohemian circle as practised, for example, by Norman Lindsay, but this was not due to "petty bourgeois morality". Rather, it was because of "their expressed desire to promote the local literary product and force recognition of it from the prevailing cultural establishment". They were, in fact, highly active in promoting Australian writers and Australian literature - through the Fellowship of Australian Writers and other formal and informal activities. This and their approach to writing and criticism

"had the effect of mainstreaming writing by women, incorporating it into the wider body of Australian letters, rather than confining it to the limited range of culturally sanctioned 'feminine' forms like romance and children's writing".

They were both also part of Nettie Palmer's literary circle. She corresponded with and encouraged both of them, and she recognised the importance of their partnership. She wrote

"It isn't easy for an outsider to understand how a literary partnership is carried on but in this case it seems to work well ... Any difference in the characters of the two women doesn't make for a difference in their point of view or values".

The partnership became harder to maintain after Eldershaw moved to Canberra in 1941. However, as well as still providing each other support, they were able to produce their last collaborative novel Tomorrow and tomorrow and tomorrow.

While it is generally accepted that Barnard was the more expressive writer of the two, and that Eldershaw contributed her acute critical sense, Rorabacher also states that in their early collaborative novels it is impossible to distinguish their separate contributions. Overall, Barnard did more of the creative writing while Eldershaw focused on the structure and development of their major works. However, because Eldershaw was the more outgoing and articulate of the two, it was frequently assumed, at the time, that she was the dominant partner. This did not spoil their partnership, which lasted two decades, bearing testament to the fact that both derived value from it.

== Collaborative works ==
Novels

- A House is Built

Barnard and Eldershaw wrote their first collaborative novel, A House is Built, in response to seeing an advertisement for The Bulletin prize. It went on to win this prize in 1928, shared with Katharine Susannah Prichard's Coonardoo. A House is Built was originally serialised in The Bulletin under the title, The Quartermaster. They could not find a publisher for it in Australia, so it was first published in England. It is an historical novel set in the nineteenth century, and focuses on the restricted lives of middle-class women of the era. Goldsworthy suggests that through this approach they also reflected "the dilemma of middle-class women in their own time, still largely denied the right to work and independence".

- The Glasshouse

The Glasshouse, a novel about shipboard life on a Norwegian boat travelling to Australia, was also first published in England.

- Green Memory

Green Memory, published in 1931, is a period novel set in 1850s Sydney, and deals with the lives of two sisters. A report on a 1931 meeting of the Canberra Society of Arts and Literature describes a lecture by Kenneth Binns on Green Memory in which he says the book "not only delights but ... also adds dignity and significance to Australian letters". He praises the characterisation of both the main and secondary characters, and describes Barnard and Eldershaw as "masters of vivid, picturesque yet dignified writing".

- Plaque with Laurel

Plaque with Laurel (1937) was the first published novel ever set in Australia's national capital, Canberra. It concerns a writers' conference whose attendees come from other parts of Australia.

- Tomorrow and Tomorrow and Tomorrow

Their final collaborative novel, Tomorrow and Tomorrow and Tomorrow, published in 1947 as Tomorrow and Tomorrow, is considered to be one of Australia's major early science fiction novels and was highly regarded by Australia's only Nobel Prize winner for literature, Patrick White. It is set in the 24th century and features Knarf (a novelist and historian whose name is an inversion of Frank Dalby Davison's first name). The book is essentially a story within a story, with much of it comprising an historical novel, written by the character Knarf, about "old" Australia from 1924 to 1946.

It was, however, censored for political reasons at the time: the censors demanded that 400 lines be cut, including references to "National Security regulations and how they contradicted the democratic principles for which the war was supposedly being fought". In 1952, in Federal Parliament, Bill Wentworth described it as "a trashy, tripey novel, with a Marxist slant". Spender argues that it stands "firmly in the tradition" of women writers like Aphra Behn, Harriet Beecher Stowe and Elizabeth Gaskell who "have utilised fiction as a means of urging society to create a better world". It was not published in its entirety until Virago Press reissued it in 1983.

There has been discussion in literary circles about how collaborative this novel is, fuelled partly by later comments by Barnard. This is despite significant evidence to the contrary, including Barnard's asking Palmer to obtain Eldershaw's signature as well as her own for his copy. In later years Barnard claimed that Eldershaw's removal to Canberra in 1941 broke down their collaboration on the novel, although in 1941 she wrote to Palmer that "we're not going to let a little thing like distance interfere with collaboration. It's a pity the new book isn't further along". Maryanne Dever argues that there is significant evidence for Eldershaw's active involvement in the novel, including correspondence from the publisher referring to them both, and Eldershaw's later letter to Miles Franklin in which she commented on "the awful effort of having to close up the gaps left by the censor and adapting the ending".

Drama

Barnard and Eldershaw wrote several stage and radio plays. Their first radio play, The Watch on the Headland, was broadcast on the ABC on 7 July 1940 as part of their Sunday Competition Play series. The subject of the play was the early days of settlement in Sydney. The competition winners were announced on 30 September 1940, with Barnard Eldershaw's play being placed 2nd.

Histories

In one of their histories, My Australia (1939), they argue a case for Australia's future saying that "nothing corrupts a people more quickly than the opportunity to make a profit out of their fellows".

Essays and lectures

A major and still well-regarded work is their Essays in Australian Fiction (1938). This book contained critical essays on Henry Handel Richardson, Katharine Susannah Prichard, Leonard Mann, Martin Boyd (under his pseudonym Martin Mills), Christina Stead and Eleanor Dark.

== Bibliography ==
Novels

- A House is Built (1929)
- Green Memory (1931)
- The Glasshouse (1936)
- Plaque with Laurel (1937)
- Tomorrow and Tomorrow (1947)

Short story collections

- Coast to Coast 1946 (1947, ed.)
- But not for Love (1988, unpublished in their time, edited by Robert Darby)

Histories

- Phillip of Australia (1938)
- The Life and Times of Captain John Piper (1939)
- My Australia (1939)

Essays

- Essays in Australian Fiction (1938)

Drama

- The Watch on the Headland (c. 1946)
