= 1850 in Australian literature =

This article presents a list of the historical events and publications of Australian literature during 1850.

== Events ==
- The Freeman's Journal was first published on 27 June 1850. It would continue under this title until 1932 when it was renamed Catholic Freeman's Journal.
- The Empire newspaper was founded by Henry Parkes and published from 28 December 1850 to 14 February 1875, except for the period from 28 August 1858 to 23 May 1859, when publication was suspended. It was later absorbed by The Evening News.

== Books ==
- John Broxup – The Life of John Broxup: Late Convict of Van Diemen's Land

== Short stories ==
- Samuel Sidney
  - "An Australian Ploughman's Story"
  - "Two-Handed Dick the Stockman : An Adventure in the Bush"

== Poetry ==
- Charles Harpur – "Rhymes to a Lady with a Copy of Love Poems"
- Henry Parkes – "Sunrise, from Bourke's Statue"

== Births ==
A list, ordered by date of birth (and, if the date is either unspecified or repeated, ordered alphabetically by surname) of births in 1850 of Australian literary figures, authors of written works or literature-related individuals follows, including year of death.

- 13 December – Edward Booth Loughran (in Glasgow, Scotland) journalist and poet (died 1928)

Unknown date

- John Arthur Barry, (in Torquay, Devonshire, England) journalist and author (died 1911)
- Robert Richardson, poet and writer for children (died 1901)

== See also ==
- 1850 in poetry
- 1850 in literature
- List of years in literature
- List of years in Australian literature
