= Marjorie Barnard =

Australian novelist and short story writer, critic and historian

Marjorie Barnard OAM
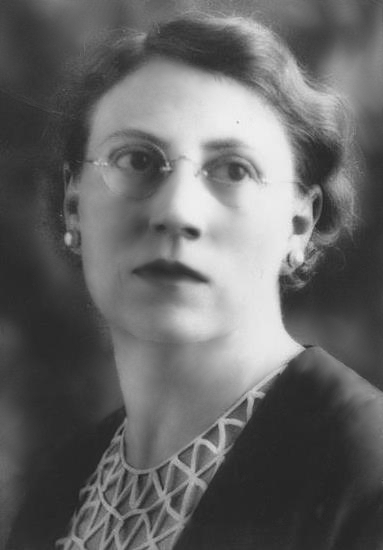
- Marjorie Barnard, c. 1935
- Born: 16 August 1897; Ashfield, Sydney, New South Wales, Australia
- Died: 8 May 1987 (aged 89); Point Clare, New South Wales, Australia
- Occupations: Novelist and short story writer, critic, historian

Marjorie Faith Barnard OAM (16 August 1897 – 8 May 1987) was an Australian novelist and short story writer, critic, historian and librarian. She went to school and university in Sydney, and then trained as a librarian. She was employed as a librarian for two periods in her life (1923–1935 and 1942–1950), but her main passion was writing.

Barnard met her collaborator, Flora Eldershaw (1897–1956), at the University of Sydney, and they published their first novel, A House is Built in 1929. Their collaboration spanned the next two decades, and covered the full range of their writing: fiction, history and literary criticism. They published under the pseudonym M. Barnard Eldershaw. Marjorie Barnard was a significant part of the literary scene in Australia between the wars and, for both her work as M. Barnard Eldershaw and in her own right, is recognised as a major figure in Australian letters.

== Life ==
Barnard was born in Ashfield, Sydney, to Ethel Frances and Oswald Holme Barnard, and was their only surviving child. She had polio as a child and was taught by a governess until she was 10 years old. She then attended the Cambridge School and Sydney Girls High School. After high school, she went to the University of Sydney, from which she graduated with first class honours and the first University Medal for History in 1918. She was offered a scholarship to Oxford, but her father refused her permission to go, and so she trained as a librarian at the Sydney Teachers' College. She worked as a librarian at the Public Library of New South Wales and then the Sydney Technical College until 1935 when she left to write full-time, at the encouragement of her friend, writer and literary critic, Nettie Palmer, and made possible through a small allowance from her father. She wrote to Nettie Palmer at the time that she was seeking "some sort of fulfilment, to run my vital energy into a creative mould instead of just letting it soak into the thirsty sand of a daily round".

She joined the Fellowship of Australian Writers in 1935, of which Flora Eldershaw was President for a couple of terms. During the next five years, she, Flora Eldershaw and Frank Dalby Davison were known as "the triumvirate" for their joint work on political and cultural policy. As well as Flora Eldershaw and Frank Dalby Davison, Marjorie Barnard knew many of the leading writers of her time, including Vance and Nettie Palmer, Miles Franklin, Katharine Susannah Prichard, Eleanor Dark, Xavier Herbert and Patrick White.

Barnard travelled overseas several times, the first time in 1933 with her mother. She loved travel but in 1986 stated that "I think it's dangerous for writers to leave their roots. I am—was—an Australian writer".

In the late 1930s, though she still lived at home, she and Flora Eldershaw took a flat in Potts Point where they held regular gatherings which operated something like a literary salon. Many of the leading literary and cultural figures of the time visited the flat, and it was here that she was able to spend time with Frank Dalby Davison whom she admitted many years later had been her love. She wrote of this relationship to her writer friend, Jean Devanny, "I was deeply in love with him ... We were lovers for eight years ... In 1942 I knew things were coming to an end ... I was, as he said, very naïve". She admitted to Devanny that the break-up of this relationship was the cause of a serious illness.

Her father died in 1940, leaving her with an ailing mother. She returned to library work in 1942, at the Public Library of New South Wales and then the CSIRO. However, her mother's death in 1949 left her 'modestly independent' enabling her to leave work in 1950.

Marjorie Barnard never married, and destroyed essentially all her correspondence. However, several of her correspondents, particularly Nettie Palmer and Jean Devanny, kept her letters to them, and some of these are now held in Australian libraries and archives, such as the National Library of Australia.

She died at Point Clare on the Central Coast of New South Wales in 1987, aged 89.

== Career ==
Marjorie Barnard's writing career spanned four decades, from the 1920s to the 1960s, with the majority of her works being written in the 1930s–1940s, a period in Australia noted for its flowering of women writers. Despite this, in an interview in 1986, she stated that there was no such thing as a "woman writer", that "there are writers good and bad. Only the work counts". In the same interview, she also said, "I never achieved what I set out to do; I never achieved the goals I set myself for each book. I suppose the only exception to that would be The Persimmon Tree". She wrote little in the last twenty years of her life.

=== Collaboration ===
Barnard's writing career was inspired by her meeting Flora Eldershaw in her first year at university, and her first work was a children's book, The Ivory Gate, published in 1920. However, on seeing an advertisement for The Bulletin prize, she and Eldershaw wrote their first collaborative novel, A House is Built, which went on to win the prize in 1928, shared with Katharine Susannah Prichard's Coonardoo.

Using the pseudonym M. Barnard Eldershaw, they wrote five novels, as well as a wide range of non-fiction works including histories and criticisms, such as their well-regarded Essays in Australian Fiction (1938). This book contained essays on Henry Handel Richardson, Katharine Susannah Prichard, Leonard Mann, Martin Boyd (under his pseudonym Martin Mills), Christina Stead and Eleanor Dark.

Their final collaborative novel was Tomorrow and Tomorrow and Tomorrow. It was published in 1945 as Tomorrow and Tomorrow. It is considered to be one of Australia's major early science fiction novels and was highly regarded by Australia's only Nobel Prize winner for literature, Patrick White. However, it was censored for political reasons at the time and was not published in its entirety until Virago Press reissued it in 1983.

While it is generally accepted that Barnard was the more expressive writer of the two, and that Eldershaw contributed her acute critical sense, Rorabacher also states that in their early collaborative novels it is impossible to distinguish their separate contributions. Overall, Barnard did more of the creative writing while Eldershaw focused on the structure and development of their major works. However, because Eldershaw was the more outgoing and articulate of the two, it was frequently assumed, at the time, that she was the dominant partner. This did not spoil their partnership, which lasted two decades, bearing testament to the fact that both derived value from it.

=== Solo career ===
Barnard's most successful fictional work written in her own right is The Persimmon Tree and Other Stories (1943). It was reissued by Virago in 1985, with the inclusion of three additional stories not previously published in book form. The title story, The Persimmon Tree, is one of Australia's most anthologised stories. The stories were published soon after the end of her relationship with Davison, and were seen by Barnard as some "compensation for the hurt that was integral to their production". As Maryanne Dever writes, "stories such as 'The Persimmon Tree', 'The Woman Who Did the Right Thing' and 'Beauty is Strength' take as their themes the consequences of illicit love, rivalry between women and the withdrawal and stoicism sometimes demanded of injured lovers".

After Eldershaw's death, Barnard continued to write, mostly histories and literary criticism, including, in 1967, the first biography of Miles Franklin. She admired Franklin's character and energy but was less enamoured of her literary abilities, writing that 'her writings are eclipsed by her personality' and that 'she was no philosopher, displayed little skill in constructing her books, and not much originality in plot.'

Her History of Australia, published in 1963, was well-reviewed at the time. One reviewer compared it favourably with histories by Keith Hancock, A.G.L. Shaw, Max Crawford and Douglas Pike, writing that she "writes good narrative prose and avoids, on the whole, analysis, although she can provide good commonsense summaries (as on the convict tradition or the Federation movement) when she wishes". He goes on to say that "her argument is not original, but she states it with clarity, a well-calculated density of detail, and with authority, especially when she writes on the subject she knows best, Macquarie's world". He does however note that there are some errors and inconsistencies, and gaps in the bibliography.

== Politics ==
While she never joined a political party, she was affected by the social and political upheavals of the 1930s. During this period, Barnard, Eldershaw and Frank Dalby Davison worked together to ensure the Fellowship of Australian Writers (FAW) functioned as a trade union of professional writers and that it adopted progressive positions on political questions. It was this work that resulted in their being known as 'the triumvirate'. Fiona Capp writes, for example, that through the FAW Barnard and Eldershaw actively lobbied against National Security regulations and infringements on the freedom of speech.

Barnard regarded herself as a 'nineteenth century liberal' and defined herself as a pacifist. In 1940, she joined the Peace Pledge Union. She edited a collection of essays defending freedom, which was not published, and a pamphlet The Case for the Future, which was banned by the censor. She also joined the Australian Labor Party as confirmed in several letters to Nettie Palmer, although later denied that she had ever joined. Dever suggests that this denial may be due to the Cold War witch hunts of the 1950s in which her name, among others, was mentioned. She suggests that Barnard received more criticism at that time than Eldershaw, who was frequently defended as a member of the CLF Advisory Board, and that, not being fond of publicity, she was likely to have been "deeply disturbed" by "the accusations and embarrassingly public attention".

== FAW Marjorie Barnard Short Story Award ==
Barnard provided for a biennial prize in her will, in which $500 is offered as first prize for a short story of 3,000 words. When Yasmine Gooneratne won the award in 1991, it was titled the Marjorie Barnard Literary Award for Fiction.

- 2017: Gabrielle Leago: "The Dark Road Home"
- 2015: Dorothy Simmons: "Count Down"
- 2009: Sharyn Munro: "Live at the Bellevue"
- 2007: Geoffrey Dean: "The Man Who Forgot Himself"
- 2005: Jacqueline Winn: "Once More with Feeling"
- Carolline Rhodes
- 1999: Antonia Hildebrand: "To Breathe"
- 1997: Helen Armstrong: "Encounter at Arkadi"
- 1991: Yasmine Gooneratne: A Change of Skies (novel)

== Honours and awards ==
- 1928: The Bulletin Prize
- 1980: Medal of the Order of Australia (OAM)
- 1983: Patrick White Award
- 1984: NSW Premier's Special Award
- 1986: Honorary Doctor of Letters from the University of Sydney.

== Selected works ==
=== Fiction ===
==== As Marjorie Barnard ====
- The Persimmon Tree, and Other Stories (1943)

==== As M. Barnard Eldershaw ====
- A House is Built (1929)
- Green Memory (1931)
- The Glasshouse (1936)
- Plaque with Laurel (1937)
- Tomorrow and Tomorrow (1947)

=== Non-fiction ===
==== As Marjorie Barnard ====
- Macquarie's World (1941)
- Australian Outline (1943)
- A History of Australia (1962)
- Miles Franklin: A Biography (1967)

==== As M. Barnard Eldershaw ====
- Phillip of Australia: An Account of the Settlement of Sydney Cove, 1788-92 (1938)
- Essays in Australian Fiction (1938)
- The Life and Times of Captain George Piper (1939)
- My Australia (1939)
