= Man-Shy =

1931 novel by Frank Dalby Davison

- Self published
- Author: Frank Dalby Davison
- Language: English
- Genre: novel
- Publisher: Angus & Robertson, Australia
- Publication date: 1931
- Publication place: Australia
- Media type: Print (Hardback and Paperback)
- Pages: 153
- Followed by: The Wells of Beersheba

Man-Shy (1931) is a novel by Australian author Frank Dalby Davison. It won the ALS Gold Medal for Best Novel in 1931.

== Plot summary ==
Set on a Queensland cattle station, the novel tells the story of the interactions between man and beast with the cattle receiving prominence.

== Publication ==
The author was originally unable to find a publisher for the novel and was forced to publish it himself. It was later picked up by Angus & Robertson who issued a new edition.

The book was later published successfully in America, under the title The Red Heifer.

== Reviews ==
On its first release, the reviewer in The Sydney Sun praised Davison's ability to get into the mind of an animal without descending into bathos. The review concluded: "This author knows his subject, and brings to the work also a great love of all dumb brutes as well as a peculiarly fine descriptive gift. His station scenes are so vividly recalled that the reader can almost hear the bellowing of the beasts and the crack of the stockwhips."

Aidan de Brune, writing in The West Australian in a retrospective of the author's work stated that "Like the painter of pictures in oils, the writer, who is a painter of pictures in words, must trust his eye, and use his eye, before he begins to use his pen. Frank Davison understands this. He has looked closely at Australia before beginning to write about it. He has looked through his own eyes and not through the spectacles kindly provided for our use by English, and other visitors, to this country. That is why the work of Frank Dalby Davison is a portent for the future of the Australian novel."

A reviewer in The Queensland Times noted that "With a happy gift of expression, Mr. Davison has painted the ordinary round of work on a cattle station with startling new tints, and always from the angle of the beast on the hoof."

== References in books ==
In Alex Miller's novel Coal Creek, hard-boiled inmates at Stuart prison soften at this tale of a red heifer's bid for freedom, "and were like children with it, demanding to have it read to them over and over".

== Awards and nominations ==
- 1931 winner ALS Gold Medal
