= Two Worlds (radio serial) =

- Genre: drama serial
- Running time: 15mins (8:45 am – 9:00 am)
- Country of origin: Australia
- Language: English
- Syndicates: ABC
- Written by: Vance Palmer
- Original release: January 2, 1952

Two Worlds is a 1952 Australian radio serial by Vance Palmer. It concerned shearer disputes in western Queensland and the shearer's struggle to form a union. (This had been the topic of Palmer's play Hail Tomorrow.)

It won first prize in the ABC Jubilee Radio Serial Competition.
