= Elizabeth Powell (writer) =

Australian writer

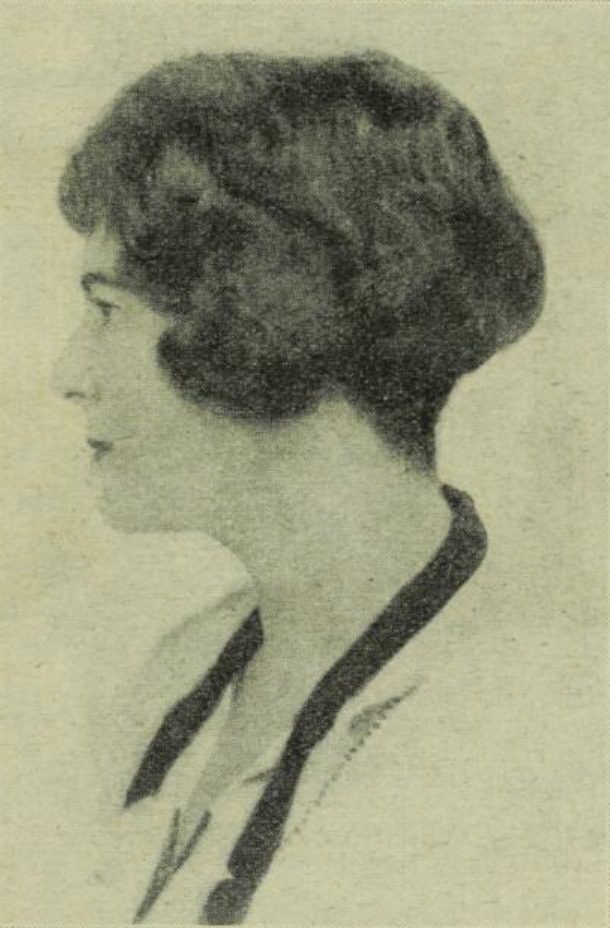
- Powell in 1928
- Born: Effie Williams; 1895; Medindie, South Australia
- Died: 16 May 1988 (aged 89–90); Adelaide, South Australia
- Occupations: Travel writer; author for children & young adults
- Writing career
- Pen name: Kirkcaldy; E. Sandery; Patricia Ann; E. P. Carne
- Period: 1926–1944
- Subjects: Central Australia; Papua

Elizabeth Powell (1895 – 16 May 1988) was an Australian travel writer and author of children's and young adult fiction. She also wrote as Kirkcaldy, E. Sandery, Patricia Ann, E. P. Carne and the byline E.S.

== Early life ==
Powell was born Effie Williams in Medindie, South Australia in 1895 to parents Harriet Elizabeth née Hawke (1871–1944) and Ernest Albert Williams (1860–1904).

== Career ==
Effie began writing stories as a child. Various accounts of her life make much of her drive to write and to succeed.

Writing as E. Sandery, her short stories and poems appeared in The Observer and The Register from 1919. She also wrote of her travels by camel and car in Central Australia and by boat in Papua for The Sydney Mail, The Daily Telegraph and The Australian Woman's Mirror from 1925.

As Kirkcaldy, her short stories and nonfiction reports were published in The Journal and The Register from 1922 and she illustrated her own work, including fairy tales for the Saturday Journal and The Observer which appeared each week through to mid-1927.

Having studied watercolour painting with Julian Ashton, in 1928 she provided the illustrations for The Wild Oats of Han by Katharine Susannah Prichard.

Writing as Patricia Ann, Powell answered readers' personal questions in a column for the Sun News-Pictorial in the 1930s. A selection of these columns was published by Publicity Press as In the Mailbag in 1938.

== Personal life and death ==
Powell married William Joseph Sandery (1895-1982) on 23 February 1916. He was in the Light Horse but was medically discharged in August 1916. They had one child, Neil Lyndon Sandery (1917–1946). As a child, Neil contributed short fiction pieces to his mother's syndicated pages. Neil was a chief officer in the merchant navy and died of smallpox whilst serving in the American Navy near Shanghai in 1946.

William petitioned for divorce in 1931 on the grounds of Powell's desertion since April 1926.

Powell relocated with her son and her mother to Sydney in the late 1920s. She later married Alfred Crews Parsons (1891–1956) who was the owner of Publicity Press in Sydney. She resided in Sydney with him in the late 1940s. He died suddenly in 1956.

She died in Adelaide on 16 May 1988.

== Publications ==
=== Fiction ===
- The Beehive, Cornstalk Publishing, 1928
- Sunset Hill, Cornstalk Publishing, 1928
- Mr Jigsaw, Cornstalk Publishing, 1928
- In the Path of Thunder, Consolidated Press, 1938
- The Fathers Have Eaten, Consolidated Press, 1939
- The Old Brown House, Angus & Robertson, 1942

=== Nonfiction ===
- Central Australia, Publicity Press, 1938
- In the Mailbag, Publicity Press, 1938 (as Patricia Ann)
