= The Long Rope (1961 film) =

1961 film by William Witney

- Theatrical release poster
- Directed by: William Witney
- Screenplay by: Robert Hamner
- Produced by: Margia Dean; Robert Hamner
- Starring: Hugh Marlowe; Alan Hale, Jr. Robert J. Wilke; Chris Robinson; William Kerwin; Jeff Morris
- Cinematography: Kay Norton
- Edited by: Peter Rolfe Johnson
- Music by: Paul Sawtell; Bert Shefter
- Production companies: Associated Producers Inc; Margo Productions
- Distributed by: 20th Century Fox
- Release date: February 1961
- Running time: 61 minutes
- Country: United States
- Language: English

The Long Rope is a 1961 American Associated Producers Inc Western film directed by William Witney and written by Robert Hamner. The film stars Hugh Marlowe, Alan Hale, Jr., Robert J. Wilke, Chris Robinson, William Kerwin and Jeff Morris. The film was released in February 1961, by 20th Century Fox.

== Cast ==
- Hugh Marlowe as Jonas Stone
- Alan Hale, Jr. as Sheriff John Millard
- Robert J. Wilke as Ben Matthews
- Chris Robinson as Reb Gilroy
- William Kerwin as Steve Matthews
- Jeff Morris as Will Matthews
- Lisa Montell as Alicia Alvarez
- David Renard as Louis Ortega
- Madeleine Taylor Holmes as Doña Vega
- John A. Alonzo as Manuel Alvarez
- Jack Powers as Luke Simms
- Kathryn Hart as Mrs. Creech
- Jack Carlin as Henchman
- Scott Randall as Henchman
- Steve Welles as Jim Matthews
- Linda Cordova as Mexican Waitress

== Production ==
The film was produced by Margia Dean, who had appeared in a number of films for Robert L. Lippert. She started up her own production company, Margot Productions. She hired William Witney to direct because she had worked with him on The Secret of the Purple Reef. "He was likeable and worked well with actors", she later said. "He was capable and within the price range, so I hired him... He did a good job."

The film was announced in October 1960.

Dean later announced she would produce Hailstorm Country for 20th Century Fox but the film was not made.
