= The Secret of the Purple Reef =

1960 film by William Witney

- Directed by: William Witney
- Written by: Harold "Yabo" Yablonsky
- Based on: "The Silent Reefs", 1952–53 short story, The Saturday Evening Post by Dorothy Cottrell
- Produced by: Gene Corman
- Starring: Richard Chamberlain; Peter Falk; Robert Earl Jones; Jeff Richards
- Cinematography: Kay Norton
- Edited by: Peter C. Johnson
- Music by: Buddy Bregman
- Production company: Associated Producers Incorporated
- Distributed by: 20th Century Fox
- Release date: December 11, 1960
- Running time: 81 minutes
- Country: United States
- Language: English
- Budget: $86,000

The Secret of The Purple Reef is a 1960 20th Century Fox CinemaScope DeLuxe Color film based on a short story by Dorothy Cottrell entitled "The Silent Reefs". It starred soon-to-be-famous actors Richard Chamberlain and Peter Falk. It is a Caribbean-based mystery involving the disappearance of a ship called the Cloud.

Although considered a "B" film, The Secret of The Purple Reef is notable in that it introduces Richard Chamberlain and Peter Falk to moviegoers as part of their early film career.

It was Richard Chamberlain's film debut, made before finding fame as Dr Kildare. In 1986 Chamberlain called it "easily the worst movie ever made, or at least the most boring".

== Plot ==
Brothers Mark (Jeff Richards) and Dean Christopher (Richard Chamberlain) and show up in a mid-'50s four door Citroën Traction Avant in early era San Juan, Puerto Rico. They arrive to solve the mystery of the circumstances of their father's drowning death in the Caribbean. They run up against a gang of unruly pirates who seem to know more than they reveal. One of the film's highlights is several scenes of an E.G. Van de Stadt designed 35 foot sailing yacht, the Starwright. The vessel adds to the Caribbean charm and plays an integral part of moving the pirates to other parts of the island.

== Cast ==
- Jeff Richards as Mark Christopher
- Margia Dean as Rue Amboy
- Peter Falk as Tom Weber
- Richard Chamberlain as Dean Christopher
- Terence De Marney as Ashby
- Robert Earl Jones as Tobias
- Gina Petrushka as Grandmere
- Larry Markow as Kilt
- Philip Rosen as Twine
- Frank Ricco as Henri
- Jerry Mitchell as Jerry

== Production ==
The story was published in 1953.

Robert L. Lippert brought Peter Falk to Hollywood to appear in Murder Inc. Lippert liked him so much he used him on this film, which was shot in Puerto Rico. Filming took place in July 1960.

Margia Dean enjoyed working with director Witney and later hired him when she produced The Long Rope (1961).

== See also ==
- List of American films of 1960
