= Pat Devanny =

Australian political activist

Patricia Devanny (5 November 1913 – 5 December 1980), also known as Patricia Hurd, was an Australian political activist.

Devanny was born at Pūponga, New Zealand, to miner Francis Harold Devanny and Jean, who were both active in the New Zealand Labour Party. The family moved to Sydney in August 1929, at the beginning of the Great Depression, and became involved in the communist movement through the unemployed workers movement. Patricia, having joined the Young Communist League, was arrested in November 1930 and sentenced to fourteen days in prison for participating in an unauthorised demonstration. While in Long Bay gaol, she and several other women participated in a hunger strike to support the "Clovelly boys", who had been imprisoned for arson after they burned the house of a landlord who evicted an unemployed family.

Devanny's activism gained her respect in the Communist Party and, in 1931, she was sent to the Communist International school in Moscow, where she studied Marxist-Leninist theory. After returning to Australia in 1933, she became national secretary of the Young Communist League of Australia and led the organisation from semi-secrecy into daily political life. She and her husband, seaman Ronald William Jackson Hurd, who had fought with a British battalion in the Spanish Civil War, travelled to New Zealand for the birth of her son before returning to Sydney. The family then spent some time in Fremantle, Western Australia, before moving to Queensland, where Devanny broke with the communist movement and joined the Australian Labor Party.

Devanny drowned in a neighbour's swimming pool in Townsville, Queensland in 1980 and was cremated.
