= Cecelia Moore Shelley =

Australian trade unionist (1893–1986)

- Miss Cecilla Shelley in 1954
- Born: Cecelia Moore Sheehy; 3 February 1893; Norwood, Adelaide, South Australia
- Died: 6 May 1986 (aged 93); Warwick, Perth, Western Australia
- Other names: Cecilia Moore Shelley; Cecelia Moore Boniface; Miss Shelley
- Occupation: Trade union secretary
- Organization(s): Hotel, Club, Caterers, Tearooms and Restaurants Employees' Industrial Union of Workers
- Spouse: Robert Jack Boniface (m. 1935; div. 1957)
- Parent(s): Francis Peter Sheehy; Honora Sheehy (née O'Callaghan)

Cecelia Moore Shelley (3 February 1893 – 6 May 1986) was an Australian trade union official and women's rights activist in Western Australia. As secretary of the Hotel, Club, Caterers, Tearooms and Restaurants Employees' Industrial Union of Workers from 1920, she led strikes in 1919, 1921 and 1925 and built the union into a substantial force in the Perth hospitality industry. She became known to employers and rival union leaders as "the Tigress of Trades Hall". She was also active for many years in the Western Australian branch of the Australian Labor Party and its women's organisation, and helped establish several groups supporting unemployed and low-paid working women during the 1930s.

== Early life ==
Shelley was born at Norwood, Adelaide on 3 February 1893. She was one of nine children of brewery worker, Francis Peter Sheehy and Honora O'Callaghan. Her father was dismissed after protesting about pay and conditions at his workplace, and the family moved to Esperance, Western Australia, in 1897 and then on to Kalgoorlie. There he anglicised the family's Irish surname from "Sheehy" to "Shelley", started a cordial-manufacturing business that failed, and returned to brewery work. His wife reportedly struggled to support the children on his low wage.

Attending St Joseph's Convent School in Boulder, Shelley left school at 14. She entered the workforce as a kitchen maid at a boarding house, followed by a position as a live-in domestic servant for a Perth family, where she experienced at first hand the harsh conditions faced by unskilled women workers. When her employer withheld her wages, she sought a lawyer's help. She subsequently moved between jobs in the hotel and catering trade, and while working at a Perth tearoom took part in a protest over the absence of a tea break for staff.

== Trade union career ==
Encouraged by her father, Shelley joined the Hotel, Club, Caterers, Tearooms and Restaurants Employees' Industrial Union of Workers of Western Australia soon after the tearoom protest. She was elected an organiser for the union within two years and became its paid secretary in 1920. She led strikes in 1919, 1921 and again in 1925, and the union came to be known informally as "Miss Shelley's Union". Despite a slight build, she developed a reputation for toughness in dealing with employers and male union officials alike, who nicknamed her "the Tigress of Trades Hall".

Under her leadership the union's coverage expanded steadily. By 1950 it administered fifteen industrial awards, and its membership grew to 2,600 in 1965. Her final years as secretary were marked by internal battles to retain control of the union, and not successful in being elected to the position at an election in 1968.

== Political activity ==
Shelley was actively involved as a member of the Western Australian Organisation of Labor Women and the Australian Labor Party (ALP). In 1924 she unsuccessfully sought both the vice-presidency of the ALP's state executive and preselection as a Senate candidate. Influenced by her father, a committed unionist, Shelley was also working with George Ryce and the writer Katharine Susannah Prichard to bring about change. Both Richard and Ryce were members of the Communist Party of Australia. Shelley's subsequent association with the Communist Party, and her refusal to follow directives from the ALP state executive led to her expulsion from both the party and the union movement's Labor bodies in 1925. She was readmitted to the ALP in 1936.

== Women's activism ==
Shelley had a strong and lasting concern for disadvantaged workers, particularly women. She helped found the Unemployed Girls and Women's Defence Committee in 1932, the International Women's Day Committee in 1936, and in 1938, the Modern Women's Club in 1938, along with Pritchard. She firmly supported the long-running campaigns for equal pay and equal opportunity for women. She was made a life member of the Trades and Labor Council of Western Australia in recognition of her decades of union service in 1979.

== Personal life ==
On 17 April 1935, Shelley married clerk, Robert Jack Boniface, at the district registrar's office in Perth. The couple had no children and divorced in 1957.

Shelley died of pneumonia on 6 May 1986 at Warwick, Perth, and was cremated.
