= Golden Miles =

1948 novel by Katharine Susannah Prichard

- First edition (UK)
- Author: Katharine Susannah Prichard
- Language: English
- Series: Goldfields trilogy
- Genre: Literary fiction
- Publisher: Holland and Stephenson, Sydney
- Publication date: 1948
- Publication place: Australia
- Media type: Print
- Pages: 385 pp
- Preceded by: The Roaring Nineties
- Followed by: Winged Seeds

Golden Miles (1948) is a novel by Australian author Katharine Susannah Prichard. The novel is the second in the author's "Goldfields" trilogy, being preceded by The Roaring Nineties and followed by Winged Seeds.

== Plot outline ==
Set in the Western Australian goldfields during the period 1914 to 1927, the novel follows the story of Sally Gough and her family. Gough is running a boarding house, her husband and one son are in the undertaking business, one son is at school, another in an assayer's office and the last is working down the mines.

== Critical reception ==
A reviewer in Western Mail (Perth) referred to any novel from Prichard as an "event", and went on: "What would be merely background to the narrative of a lesser novel is more than background in this story, for the Golden Mile is part of the life of all those who, in this book, are associated with it. In one way or another the Golden Mile, in one or another of its various phases, is an ever present factor whether, the character is a miner or a housewife. Much of the detail is authentic...Some sections of this novel are provocative and challenging—a novel which deals in part with social and industrial conditions is not likely to be otherwise. But the story itself is a colourful and entertaining tale, one of human courage and endurance and of those human qualities which helped to build Australia into a nation."

In The Age the reviewer was impressed with the novel's human warmth: "The author's great sympathy with the less fortunate is an outstanding feature of the book. So surely has she handled her material that one loses sight of the great amount of research that has gone into its making. A satisfying piece of work, it carries the reader's interest forward towards another volume."

== See also ==
- 1948 in Australian literature
