= The Black Horse (play) =

1937 radio play by Vance Palmer

The Black Horse is a 1937 Australian radio play by Vance Palmer based on his 1923 short play of the same name.

It was a "one act tragedy".

Leslie Rees called it "one of the finest stage one acters yet written in Australia." The play has been performed on stage a number of times and it was published in a collection of plays in 1925.

It was produced again for radio in 1939, 1949, and 1958.

== Premise ==
"Young Walter Bain is at home on school holidays. He is a pleasant, rather indolent lad, spoilt by his mother, bullied by his fearless, brutal father. He prefers a soft bed and a book to the thrill of breaking in horses or rounding up cattle, so when his father suggests that he ride the black colt, which is feared by all the cattle hands, he is not enthusiastic. Vance Palmer’s restrained treatment of his theme gives vividness to the inevitable tragedy."
