= Winged Seeds =

1950 novel by Katharine Susannah Prichard

- First edition
- Author: Katharine Susannah Prichard
- Language: English
- Series: Goldfields trilogy
- Genre: Literary fiction
- Publisher: Jonathan Cape
- Publication date: 1950
- Publication place: Australia
- Media type: Print
- Pages: 388 pp
- Preceded by: Golden Miles
- Followed by: Subtle Flame

Winged Seeds is a 1950 novel by Australian author Katharine Susannah Prichard. The novel is the third in the author's "Goldfields" trilogy, being preceded by The Roaring Nineties and Golden Miles.

== Plot outline ==
The novel is again set in the West Australian goldfields, this time in 1936, and also follows the life of its main character Sally Gough. Time has moved on and now Gough's grandchildren are making their living on the land. But the 1930s Depression has hit them hard and then war arrives and the grandsons head off to war in Europe.

== Critical reception ==
A reviewer in The Sydney Morning Herald noted that this trilogy was not to the standard of some of the author's earlier work: "The story began in the early 90s of last century and throughout Miss Prichard has spun three concurrent threads on her loom-the lusty history of the goldfields, the lives and loves of a group of people centring on the vital figure of Sally Gough, and the social struggle of the workers. It was a very tall order to sustain the three themes for half a century, and now that the trilogy has been completed one feels that the author attempted too much."

== See also ==
- 1950 in Australian literature
