= The Sea Hawk (radio play) =

1938 radio play by Vance Palmer

Wireless Weekly 19 Jan 1942

The Sea Hawk is a 1938 Australian radio play by Vance Palmer. It was one of is most notable works.

The play was based on a short story by Palmer that won the 1934 Melbourne Centenary Short Story competition.

The play was successful and produced again in 1939, 1942, and 1953.

== Premise ==
"It tells of old Gundersen and his fishing boat, The Sea-hawk. Everybody said: “She’ll never get out of the water till you pile her up on the coral.” But old Gundy knew better."
