= The Big Fellow (novel) =

1959 novel by Vance Palmer

- First edition
- Author: Vance Palmer
- Language: English
- Publisher: Angus and Robertson, Australia
- Publication date: 1959
- Publication place: Australia
- Media type: Print (Hardback & Paperback)
- Preceded by: Seedtime
- Followed by: –

The Big Fellow (1959) is the last novel by Australian author Vance Palmer. It won the 1959 Miles Franklin Award.

This is the third in the author's Golconda trilogy of novels, following Golconda (1948) and Seedtime (1957).

== Story outline ==
The novel continues the story of the Big Fellow, Macy Donovan, a politician in Queensland. Now 50 he is about to take over the role of Premier as the incumbent. Wardle, departs for a cosy job in London.

== Critical reception ==
Lisa Hill, on the ANZLitLovers Litblog was rather disappointed with the novel: "I think it might have come as a bit of a disappointment to readers lured to the title by the award. It is just not in the same class as its predecessors. I wouldn’t recommend spending any time hunting out a copy, but as a period piece it has some nostalgia-factor charm. Palmer’s realism is achieved with snippets that bring the 1950s to life. Brisbane still has its trams, there are porters on the railway stations, and people read books and play cards at night instead of watching the box. I felt a vague nostalgia reading about a time when a state politician could move freely around at whim without bodyguards and a media pack at heel."

In his extensive study of Vance Palmer's work Harry Hesletine stated:"It is characteristic of Palmer that he opened the last volume of the trilogy at the zenith of Donovan's career only for the sake of exploring the disappointments, frustrations, and failures which underlie his seemingly gleaming achievement...In taking Donovan back to Golconda for this insight into his future. Palmer closes The Big Fellow with a forceful reminder of its integral relation to Seedtime and Golconda: the trilogy ends where it had begun. And however wide a range of material his fascination with Australian society encouraged, however broad a span of space and time his panoramic structure demanded, he undoubtedly made of the three novels a single and unified work of art."
