= Telling Mrs Baker =

1937 radio play by Vance Palmer

- Genre: drama play
- Country of origin: Australia
- Language: English
- Written by: Vance Palmer; Henry Lawson (original short story)
- Directed by: John Cairns
- Original release: July 15, 1937

Telling Mrs Baker is a 1937 Australian radio play by Vance Palmer based on his 1922 stage play of the same name, which was adapted from a story by Henry Lawson.

It was called "a one act character comedy."

The play was later produced for radio again in 1942, 1953, 1954 (on a double bill with Dreamtime) and 1959.

== Premise ==
"A comedy of character with a typical Henry Lawson touch. It tells of two drovers whose task it is to call on the wife of their dead mate and tell how he died."
