= Jeff Morris (actor) =

American actor

- Born: September 20, 1934; St. Joseph, Missouri, U.S.
- Died: July 12, 2004 (aged 69); Los Angeles, California, U.S.
- Occupation: Actor
- Years active: 1958–2003

Jeff Morris (September 20, 1934 – July 12, 2004) was an American film and television actor. Among his roles was Bob, the owner of Bob's Country Bunker, in The Blues Brothers. He later reprised his role in Blues Brothers 2000.

== Biography ==
Jeff Morris (born Morris Berger) was born in St. Joseph, Missouri to Jewish parents Abe and Hazel Berger. He was raised in Lubbock, Texas., where Morris and his brother Bob faced anti-Semitic prejudice. Nonetheless, he made friends and joined the Lubbock High football team.

After graduating from Lubbock High School in 1953, he went to Hollywood and worked his way into the movies. He had roles in many war films, including Private Cowboy in Kelly's Heroes and in television westerns, Death Valley Days (including the role of Morgan Earp), and Bonanza.

Morris appeared in a number of films starring Jack Nicholson, among them Goin' South, The Border, Ironweed, The Two Jakes, The Crossing Guard and Anger Management.

== Filmography ==
- 1958 The Bonnie Parker Story as Marvin
- 1959 Paratroop Command as "Pigpen"
- 1959 The Legend of Tom Dooley as Confederate Soldier
- 1961 The Long Rope as Will Matthews
- 1962 Kid Galahad as Ralphie
- 1963 The Twilight Zone (S5 E10, TV series) (The 7th Cavalry is Made up of Phantoms) as Finnigan
- 1965 36 Hours Bit Part (uncredited)
- 1968-1972 Bonanza (TV Series) as Tulsa / Hal / "Turk" Murphy / Matthew Brody / Dunne / Haley
- 1970 Kelly's Heroes as Private First Class "Cowboy"
- 1971-1972 Mission Impossible (TV Series) as Dan Page / Smiler
- 1971 Mannix (TV series) (Murder Times Three) as Grove
- 1971-1974 Ironside (TV Series) as Milt Archer / Sheriff Matt Gibson / Frank Richards
- 1972 Payday as Bob Tally
- 1977 The Gauntlet as Desk Sergeant
- 1978 Goin' South as Abe "Big Abe", Moon's Old Gang
- 1979 CHiPs (TV Series) as LeMasters
- 1980 The Blues Brothers as Bob, The Owner of Bob's Country Bunker
- 1982 The Border as J.J.
- 1987 Ironweed as "Michigan Mac"
- 1989 The Freeway Maniac as Ray
- 1990 The Two Jakes as Tilton
- 1995 The Crossing Guard as Silas
- 1997 Too Much Sleep as The Bartender
- 1998 Blues Brothers 2000 as Bob, The Owner of Bob's Country Kitchen
- 1998 Susan's Plan as Larry Cooper
- 2001 The Homecoming of Jimmy Whitecloud as Jim (scenes deleted)
- 2003 Anger Management as Porter (final film role)
