= Earth-Visitors (to N. L.) =

1928 poem by Australian poet Kenneth Slessor

- by Kenneth Slessor
- Written: 1928
- First published in: Fanfrolicana
- Country: Australia
- Language: English

"Earth-Visitors (to N. L.)" (1928) is a poem by Australian poet Kenneth Slessor.

It was originally published in Fanfrolicana, an anthology of original poetry, in 1928, and was subsequently reprinted in the author's single-author collections and a number of Australian poetry anthologies.

The "N. L." of the title is Australian writer and artist Norman Lindsay, specifically mentioning "Springwood" where Lindsay lived.

== Critical reception ==
In his Oxford University Press study of the poet critic Adrian Caesar commented: "The poem by attempting to evoke an immortal world of erotic grandeur, labours to subvert its own ostensible argument. Present bankruptcy is regenerated by this appeal to the past and to the realm of the exotic 'other' located in an Asia of the imagination."

Andrew Taylor's essay discussing Slessor's approach to modernism noted that the poem “can be read as a nostalgic evocation of a (non-existent) past in which heaven and earth, the gods and humanity, were more accessible to each other than they are today. It is also a celebration of love and sensuality as being all that can open up for us that fuller sense of wonder and awe which we rarely experience but still dream about.”

== Publication history ==
After the poem's initial publication in Fanfrolicana in 1928 it was reprinted as follows:

- The New Countries : A Collection of Stories and Poems by South African, Australian, Canadian and New Zealand Writers edited by Hector Bolitho, Jonathan Cape 1929
- One Hundred Poems : 1919-1939 by Kenneth Slessor, Angus and Robertson, 1944
- A Book of Australian Verse edited by Judith Wright, Oxford University Press, 1956
- Poems by Kenneth Slessor, Angus and Robertson, 1957
- Cross-Country : A Book of Australian Verse edited by John Barnes and Brian MacFarlane, Heinemann, 1984
- Kenneth Slessor : Poetry, Essays, War Despatches, War Diaries, Journalism, Autobiographical Material and Letters edited by Dennis Haskell, University of Queensland Press, 1991
- The Oxford Book of Australian Love Poems edited by Jennifer Strauss, Oxford University Press, 1993
- Kenneth Slessor : Collected Poems by Kenneth Slessor, Angus and Robertson, 1994

== Notes ==
- The full text of the poem can be found on the All Poetry website

== See also ==
- 1928 in Australian literature
- 1928 in poetry
