= Fellowship of Australian Writers =

The Fellowship of Australian Writers (FAW) is a collection or federation of state-based organizations aiming to support and promote the interests of Australian writers. It was established in Sydney in 1928, with the aim of bringing writers together and promoting their interests. The organisation played a key role in the establishment of the Australian Society of Authors in 1963, a national body and now the main professional organisation in Australia for writers of literary works.

As of 2023, the following state-based independent organisations carried the name: Fellowship of Australian Writers NSW Inc. (a continuation of the original), Fellowship of Australian Writers Queensland, Fellowship of Australian Writers Tasmania, Fellowship of Australian Writers (VIC) Inc., and the Fellowship of Australian Writers (WA) Inc.

== History ==
Various claims have been made about its origin, but it seems that poet, Mary Gilmore, was encouraged by Roderic Quinn, and helped by Lucy Cassidy (wife of poet R.J. Cassidy), to hold a meeting of writers, at which a president, John Le Gay Brereton was elected. It was founded in 1928, and at that time quite a political body, affiliated with the Australian labour movement as well as international peace organisations. It advocated for fair pay for written work, which continued to be one of its aims for 50 years. By the end of 1932 (a difficult time economically, being the Great Depression in Australia), there were 290 members; among the ranks were Miles Franklin, Dorothea Mackellar, and Frank Clune.

It was initially a Sydney-based organisation, but gradually spread to other states, to Victoria, Queensland, South Australia, and Western Australia. In 1947 a branch was created in Tasmania by historian John Reynolds, E. Morris Miller, Louis Triebel, Basil Rait, and Joyce Eileen Eyre, who took the role of corresponding secretary.

In 1955 a federal council was established, under the title Commonwealth Council of the Fellowships of Australian Writers. Under the Council Constitution, the Council president (chair) rotated between the state FAW presidents every two years, with writer and academic Tom Inglis Moore being elected the first president in 1956.

Early prominent members include: in New South Wales, Flora Eldershaw, Marjorie Barnard, Frank Dalby Davison, Dymphna Cusack; in Victoria, Nettie Palmer; and in Western Australia, Henrietta Drake-Brockman and Katharine Susannah Prichard.

The FAW was, with ex-Prime Minister Jim Scullin, largely responsible for a trebling of the Commonwealth Literary Fund's budget in 1939.

The organisation grew in the 1970s and 1980s, and in 1985, under president Hilarie Lindsay, there were nine metropolitan groups, 11 in country areas and a group of "Isolated Writers". A country regional branch was started in the Riverina in 2010.

In 2011 the Fellowship of Writers adopted its new constitution and a new logo.

Its activities over the years included the creation and running of events such as Authors' Week (1930s), Children's Book Week (1940s), and a number of competitions and awards for writers.

== Australian Authors' Week ==
In 1935 the Fellowship organised an Authors' Week to, in the words of their press release, "encourage the development of our national literature, especially by bringing the work of our authors before the general public and schools". The week took place from 8 to 13 April and was held at Farmers' Blaxland Galleries. Events included personal appearances by authors, display of Australian books, dramatisations from Australian works, lectures by writers, radio broadcasts and an authors' ball.

The event was prompted by a longstanding desire of the FAW to strengthen the place of Australian literature in Australian society, and it was believed that a way to do this was to encourage a closer dialogue between authors and their audience. The week was preceded by significant promotion and communication to the community primarily through newspapers and magazines. An editorial written in The Telegraph during the week commented on the popularity of Ion Idriess and suggested that:

Therein is cause to hope that ere long the appreciation for Australian writings will grow and widen to embrace the works of many others who, with a growing confidence in ultimate success, are continually and obscurely working to give Australians a literature which they may call their own.

The events of the week were mostly held during the day and hence primarily reached, or in some cases specifically targeted at, women, children and teachers. Indeed, it was generally accepted that women formed the bulk of the readership. Norman Lindsay, for example, wrote that "My personal opinion is that the average woman reads much better stuff than the average man". In his Authors' Week talk, Frank Dalby Davison said that "many people preferred yelling themselves hoarse at a test match or racecourse to reading a book by a cultured author".

Overall, the Week was deemed a success, with Marjorie Barnard writing that they'd received "a good deal of publicity" and were "pretty satisfied with the effort".

== Awards ==
=== Historical ===
==== Patricia Weickhardt Award ====
The FAW Patricia Weickhardt Award to an Aboriginal Writer was awarded from 1976 to 1991 to Aboriginal Australian authors. It took its name from Patricia Weickhardt, who sponsored the award herself. (Note: There is a Patricia Leichardt in Melbourne, a former teacher who works as a volunteer English tutor for refugees at AMES Australia... could be the same one?) The award ceased after an unnamed committee member suggested that Aboriginal authors were becoming mainstream and it was patronising to provide a separate award for them. Winners included:

- 1976: Dick Roughsey
- 1977: Kath Walker (later known as Oodgeroo Noonuccal)
- 1978: Kevin Gilbert
- 1979: Colin Johnson, aka Mudrooroo
- 1980: Jack Davis
- 1981: Hyllus Maris
- 1983: Archie Weller
- 1984?: James Wilson-Miller
- 1985: Oodgeroo Noonuccal and David Unaipon (posthumously)
- 1986: Bob Merritt
- 1987: Eric Willmot
- 1988: Lionel Fogarty
- 1989: Sally Morgan
- 1990: Sam Watson
- 1991: Glenys Ward (also known as Glenyse Ward) and/or Richard Walley

==== Other former awards ====
The Walter Stone Award was established in 1984, named after bibliophile and publisher Wal Stone. The inaugural prize was won by Berenice Eastman for her book about Nan Chauncy.

In 1999, David Foster and Bruce Pascoe jointly won the FAW Australian Literature Award.

=== Current ===
The national, state and regional offices of the FAW offer a large number of literary competitions and awards.

The Victorian chapter offers national awards known as the Fellowship of Australian Writers Victoria Inc. National Literary Awards, including:

- Christopher Brennan Award (formerly the Robert Frost Prize) for lifetime achievement in poetry
- Christina Stead Award
- Melbourne University Publishing Award "an award for a non-fiction book first published in Australia, of sustained quality and distinction with an Australian theme", annual for over 30 years, sponsored by Melbourne University Press.
- Anne Elder Award for poetry
- Barbara Ramsden Award for the editor as well as the author of "a book of quality writing in any field of literature"

The FAW Marjorie Barnard Short Story Award is a New South Wales award.

== Presidents ==
Presidents of the Fellowship of Australian Writers include:

- John Le Gay Brereton (1928) inaugural
- Walter Francis John Jago (1931)
- Flora Eldershaw (1935, the first woman president)
- Bartlett Adamson (c. 1938)
- Patsy Adam-Smith (1973)
- Donald Stuart (1974–1975)
- Hilarie Lindsay (1982–1984, 1992–1994)

== See also ==
- Writers SA
