= Mum Dawson, "Boss" =

1911 novel by Australian writer Sumner Locke

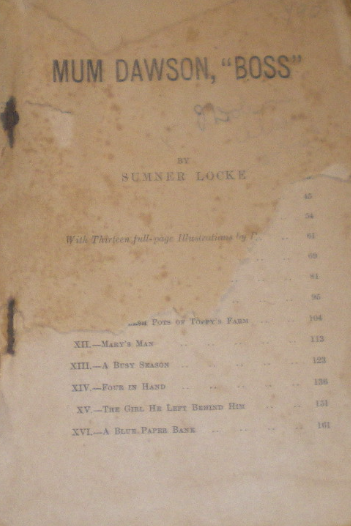
- Title page for Mum Dawson, "Boss" (1911)
- Author: Sumner Locke
- Language: English
- Genre: Fiction
- Publisher: NSW Bookstall Company
- Publication date: 1911
- Publication place: Australia
- Media type: Print
- Pages: 172 pp.
- Preceded by: -
- Followed by: The Dawsons' Uncle George

Mum Dawson, "Boss" is a 1911 Australian novel by Sumner Locke.

She adapted it into a play in 1917 that was popular.

The book established Locke's reputation.

== Critical reception ==
Writing in The Worker a reviewever noted: "There is good material in Sumner Locke's Mum Dawson, Boss. (Bookstall Series.) The writer would have made better use of it by leaving out much unnecessary realism and getting more into sympathy with the characters. As it is, however, there is plenty that is readable and amusing."

== 1917 Play Adaptation ==
The play version was produced by Bert Bailey.

Locke was the first Australian woman to have her work produced by commercial theatre management.

== See also ==
- 1911 in Australian literature
- Mum Dawson Boss at Ausstage
