= Christine (radio play) =

Christine is a 1948 Australian radio play by Vance Palmer based on his 1930 stage play of the same name.

It was "a four-act comedy, dealing with a farmer-politician and his conflict with his family when he brings a new and fashionable wife into the home."

The Brisbane Mail said "Billed as comedy but humour must have been mislaid in the adaptation."

It was produced again for radio in 1949.
