= The Interloper (radio play) =

1940 radio play by Australian author Vance palmer

- Genre: drama serial
- Running time: 30mins (9:30 pm – 10:00 pm)
- Country of origin: Australia
- Language: English
- Syndicates: ABC
- Written by: Vance Palmer
- Original release: November 9, 1940

The Interloper is a 1940 Australian radio play by Vance Palmer based on his 1927 short story of the same name.

It was one of several of his stories set on the Queensland coast.

The play was first broadcast in Queensland on 9 November 1940 on radion station 4QG Brisbane.

According to Leslie Rees "It is a good yarn for re-use in the play-form, because it does not wholly depend on careful nuances of feeling, full and exact background colour and quiet, unobtrusive characterisation, in conflict by implication rather than by statement —elements which are found in so many Palmer stories but which do not by themselves make for compelling drama."

The play was produced again in 1942, 1945, 1946 and 1950.

== Premise ==
"Harry Duggan is a fisherman—an easy-going, pleasant chap—who has married Mag, a woman who had a son by a previous relationship. The life of Harry and Mag is wholesome and smooth, until suddenly Charlie, the grown-up “bad penny” son, turns up. The ensuing scenes round the waterfront have in them the growing interest of- an intolerable triangular situation."
