= Dorothy Cottrell =

Australian writer

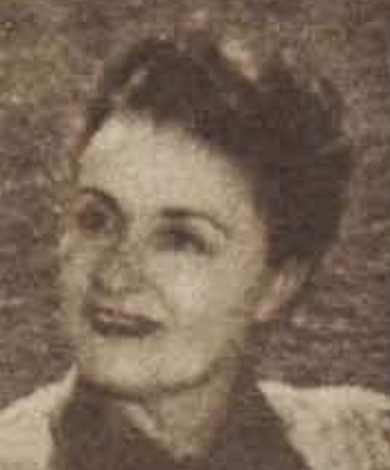
Dorothy Cottrell in 1953

Ida Dorothy Ottley Cottrell (16 July 1902 – 29 June 1957) was an Australian writer. Born in Picton, she contracted infantile paralysis as a child and spent the rest of her life in a wheelchair. Cottrell married Walter Mackenzie Cottrell on 23 May 1922. Her first novel, The Singing Gold, was published in 1928. She wrote a story Wilderness Orphan (1936) which was the basis for the feature film Orphan of the Wilderness (1936). She lived for a time in the US and also worked as an artist and cartoonist.

== Early life and education ==
Cottrell was born on 16 July 1902 in Picton, New South Wales, to parents Walter Barwon Wilkinson and Ida Constance. At the age of five, whilst living in Ballarat, she contracted polio, which left her unable to walk and reliant on a wheelchair for the rest of her life. After her parents' separation she spent much of her childhood with relatives in Queensland, living on remote sheep stations. During this time she trained dogs to pull her wheelchair and even modified vehicles so she could drive. Cottrell was initially educated by a governess before moving to Sydney to live with an Aunt. There she won a scholarship and developed her skills as an artist at the Royal Art Society of New South Wales, studying under Theodora Cowan and Dattilo Rubbo, and contributed cartoons to magazines.

== Personal life ==
In 1922, while living on Ulanrunda, a remote sheep station on Bidjara country, southwest Queensland, she met and married Walter Mackenzie Cottrell, who was working as the bookkeeper on her uncle's station. They briefly lived with writer Edmund Banfield on Dunk Island before returning to Sydney, where Cottrell continued to draw and began experimenting with fiction. In 1924 she and her husband travelled widely in rural New South Wales, selling goods from the back of a truck, before returning to Queensland. It was during this period that she began writing more seriously.

In 1927, while travelling in north western Queensland, Cottrell took custody of May, a six-year old Aboriginal girl, with the approval of the local Protector of Aborigines, under the legal policies of the time. Although Cottrell regarded the act as providing care for a vulnerable child, she later lost interest in raising her and left her behind when moving overseas. May was never reunited with her birth family, and the event is now considered part of the Stolen Generations.

== Literary career ==
In April 1927 Cottrell achieved early international recognition when her first novel, The Singing Gold, was accepted for a serial by the Ladies’ Home Journal in the United States. The sale of rights for US$5,000 was widely reported in the Australian press, and the novel was later published in book form in both London and Boston in 1929. It went on to be published in the Sydney Morning Herald and the Women's Journal (UK). It was largely autobiographical and achieved great success in Australia, Britain and the United States of America. The story, set in the Australian outback, was praised for its vivid landscapes and authentic depiction of bush life, with poet Mary Gilmore describing her as a “writer of genius.”

Her second novel, Earth Battle, was published in the US as Tharlane in 1930. Cottrell continued to explore themes of endurance and survival in the harsh Australian environment. Reviewers noted her ability to convey the beauty and dangers of the land.

== Writing in the United States ==
To avoid taxation on the proceeds of her first book Cottrell moved to the United States where she began writing for a living. During the 1930s and 1940s Cottrell built a career in the United States, contributing stories with Australian settings to major magazines, including the Saturday Evening Post. She also wrote for children, with works such as Winks: His Book (1934) and Wilderness Orphan (1936). The latter was adapted into the film Orphan of the Wilderness. Cottrell and her husband became U.S. citizens in 1939 and later settled in Florida.

A back injury in the early 1940s temporarily disrupted her writing, but she returned to fiction with The Silent Reefs (1953) a Caribbean adventure later adapted into the film The Secret of the Purple Reef (1960).

== Disability advocacy ==
Cottrell occasionally wrote about her own experiences of disability. In a 1950 article titled How to Wear a Wheelchair she challenged prevailing attitudes that framed disability as a personal tragedy. She argued instead that physical impairment was a neutral fact of life, and that barriers could be overcome with practical adaptations. She described her life as “radiantly happy,” expressing a perspective that emphasised society's barriers rather than individual limitations in understanding disability.

== Later life ==
Despite her success abroad, Cottrell remained attached to Australia and returned briefly in 1954 to help manage her family's sheep station. She and her husband later went back to Florida, where she died of heart disease on 29 June 1957 at the age of 54. She was survived by her husband and an adopted son.

== Legacy ==
Although once an internationally bestselling author whose work reached audiences in Australia, Britain, and the United States, Cottrell's reputation declined after her death, which passed largely unnoticed in the Australian press. Interest in her writing was revived in the 1970s when librarian Barbara Ross successfully advocated for her inclusion in the Australian Dictionary of Biography. A number of her paintings and drawings are held in the National Library of Australia collection. More recently, scholars have highlighted both her pioneering achievements as a woman writer with a disability and the more troubling aspects of her life. Her legacy is also viewed in light of contemporary understandings of the Stolen Generations, due to her involvement in the removal of an Aboriginal child during her travels in 1927.

== Writings ==
- The Singing Gold (1927)
- Earth Battle (1927) (US:
- A Little Chapel of Memory (1932 est) Booklet on Mission Inn, Riverside, CA
- Winks: His Book (1934)
- Wilderness Orphan (1936) - filmed as Orphan of the Wilderness (1936)
- The Silent Reefs (1953) - filmed as The Secret of the Purple Reef (1960)
