= Frank Dalby Davison =

Novelist and short story writer

Frank Dalby Davison MBE
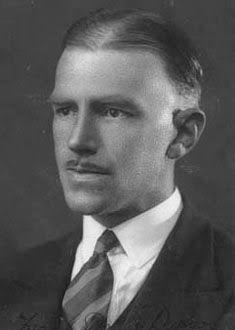
- Born: Frederick Douglas Davison; 23 June 1893; Hawthorn, Victoria, Australia
- Died: 24 May 1970 (aged 76); Melbourne, Australia
- Other names: F. D. Davison; Freddie Davison; F. Myall Davison; Frederick Douglas; T Bone; The Roo; Francis Daly; Frank Daniels; John Sandes; Scott McGarvie
- Occupation: Fiction writer
- Known for: Novels and short stories
- Spouse(s): Agnes (known as Kay) Ede, m. 1915; Edna Marie McNab, m. 1944

Frank Dalby Davison MBE (23 June 1893 – 24 May 1970), also known as F. D. Davison and Freddie Davison, was an Australian novelist and short story writer. Whilst several of his works demonstrated his progressive political philosophy, he is best known as "a writer of animal stories and a sensitive interpreter of Australian bush life in the tradition of Henry Lawson, Joseph Furphy and Vance Palmer." His most popular works were two novels, Man-shy and Dusty, and his short stories.

== Life ==
Davison was born in Hawthorn, Victoria, and christened as Frederick Douglas Davison. His father was Frederick Davison, a printer, publisher, editor, journalist and writer of fiction; and his mother was Amelia, née Watterson. He was their eldest child. He went to Caulfield State School, but left when he was 12, and worked on his father's land at Kinglake in the mountain range north of Melbourne, before moving to the United States with his family in 1909. Here Davison was apprenticed to the printing trade, and first started writing.

Between 1909 and the beginning of World War I, he travelled widely in North America and the West Indies. However, with the beginning of the war, he went to England and enlisted, serving in France with the British cavalry. He met his wife Agnes (who was known as Kay) Ede in England while he was doing officer training at Aldershot and they married in 1915. They had a son and a daughter. Davison and his family came to Australia in 1919 after the war ended, and took up a Soldier Settlement selection near Injune, Queensland. However, the farm failed, and, in 1923, he and his family moved to Sydney, where he worked in real estate and as an advertising manager for his father's magazines, the Australian and Australia.

He had a romantic relationship with fellow writer, Marjorie Barnard, through the late 1930s. Barnard used an inversion of his name "Knarf" for the hero of her collaborative novel Tomorrow and Tomorrow and Tomorrow.

During World War II, he worked in government departments in Sydney and Melbourne.

His marriage, which had been failing for some time, was dissolved, and in 1944 he married Edna Marie McNab. In 1951, they bought a farm called "Folding Hills" at Arthurs Creek, Victoria, where he wrote his last major work, The White Thorntree (1968).

Davison died in Melbourne on 24 May 1970.

== Writing career ==
Davison began writing full-time during the depression, adopting, at this time, the names Frank Dalby to distinguish himself from his father. He won the Australian Literature Society Gold Medal for his novel Man-shy in 1931.

Man-shy is "the story of a red heifer ... who learned to value freedom above everything". It was initially published in serial form in 1923–25 in his father's Australian magazine. Later, with the Depression impacting his earning ability, he tried to find a publisher. However, no-one was interested in a book "about a cow", so he published it himself. Angus & Robertson took it on after it won the Australian Literature Society's award.

During the 1930s he worked as a real-estate agent and also as a special contributor to The Bulletin. He produced several stories and books, including the novel Children of the Dark People and the short story collection The Woman at the Mill.

While Man-shy took over 7 years to be published, his last book, The White Thorntree, took over 22 years to write. Smith wrote in 1980 that it "deals with human beings and their sexual expressions of themselves as no other Australian writer has done". The first edition was published with a cover designed by artist and friend, Clifton Pugh.

Davison was active in the Fellowship of Australian Writers and, through the 1930s, formed a close working relationship with Marjorie Barnard and Flora Eldershaw. Barnard, Eldershaw and Davison were known as the "triumvirate" for their work in developing progressive policies through the Fellowship on such issues as civil liberties and censorship. In the Acknowledgment for Dusty (1946) he wrote:

A few years ago I was granted a year's Fellowship by the Commonwealth Literary Fund to carry out certain work. This is the first opportunity I have had to make suitable acknowledgments. I am hoping this book will be accepted as completing the undertaking of which the volume of short stories, The Woman at The Mill, was the first part. This is not the novel I had in mind – perhaps it is a better one! – but it accrues from that year in which I had free time to work and grow, and for which I am grateful to my fellow citizens and the community of letters.

He was also a long-time friend of Vance and Nettie Palmer and John Morrison. He was, in September 1949, a charter member of the Australian Peace Council.

Davison wrote under several pseudonyms: T Bone; The Roo; Davison, Fred D.; Fred Davison, Junr; Fred Junr; Davison, F. Myall; Douglas, Frederick; Daly, Francis; Daniels, Frank; Sandes, John; McGarvie, Scott; F. D. D.

His novel, Dusty was made into a film in 1983.

== Themes ==
His concern about the destruction of the Australian natural environment and his political interest in promoting "liberal democratic values" are reflected in his writings. "He saw literature as a means by which people might be helped to know themselves and their society as a necessary prelude to reform". Smith suggests that while much of his writing focuses on nature and the land, several stories and his last book explore the emotional and sexual relationships between men and women.

== Awards ==
- 1931: Australian Literature Society Gold Medal for Man-shy
- 1938: MBE for services to literature
- 1939–40: Commonwealth Literary Fund Fellowship
- 1946: Argus prize for Dusty

== Bibliography ==
- Forever Morning (1931)
- Man-Shy (1931)
- The Wells of Beersheba (1933)
- Blue Coast Caravan (1935)
- The Wasteland (1935)
- Children of the Dark People (1936)
- The Woman at the Mill (1940)
- Dusty (1946)
- The Road to Yesterday (1964)
- The White Thorntree (1968)
- The Wells of Beersheba and Other Stories (1985, published posthumously)
