= Sumner Locke =

Australian writer

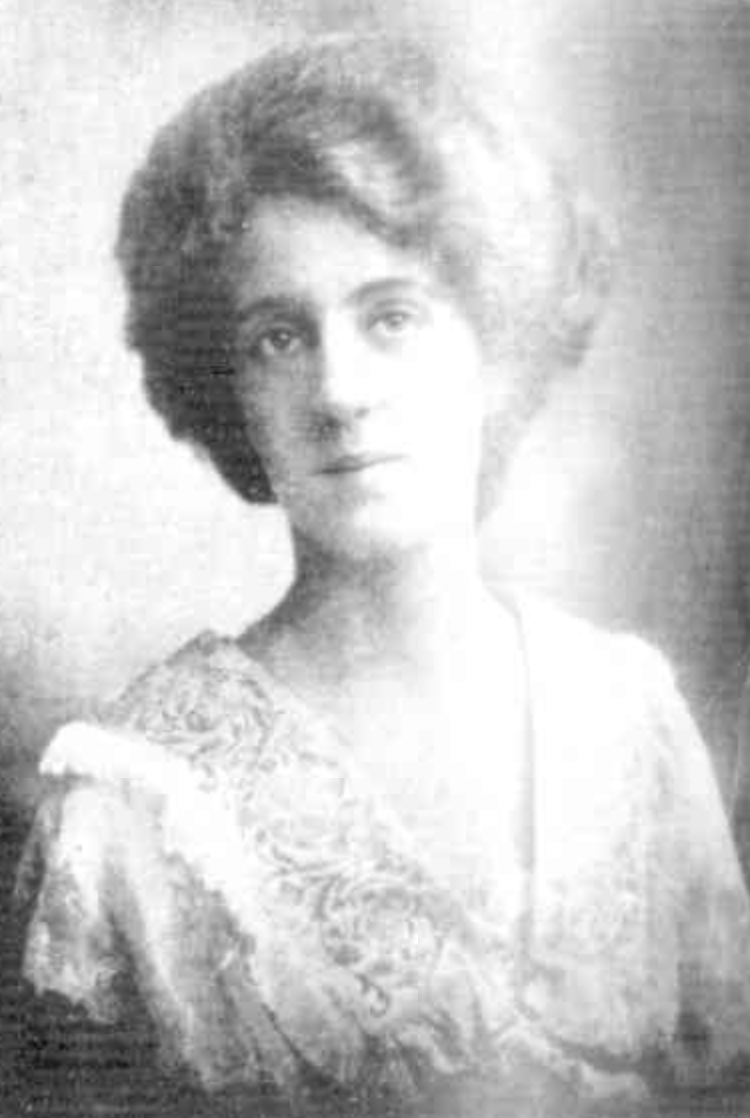
- Sumner Locke in 1908
- Born: Helena Sumner Locke; 4 July 1881; Sandgate, Queensland, Australia
- Died: 18 October 1917 (aged 36); Kogarah, New South Wales, Australia
- Occupations: Novelist; dramatist; playwright; poet; short story writer
- Relatives: Lilian Locke (sister) Sumner Locke Elliott (son)
- Writing career
- Notable work: Samaritan Mary

Helena Sumner Locke (4 July 1881 – 18 October 1917) was an Australian novelist, dramatist/playwright, poet and short story writer. Her sister was the socialist Lilian Locke.

== Early life ==
Born in 1881, she was the sixth daughter of Anglican clergyman Rev. William Locke and Annie (née Seddon), both born in England. She spent the early years of her childhood in Queensland before moving with her family to Melbourne in 1888.

== Career ==
Locke began publishing short stories in such publications as The Bulletin and the Native Companion before her first play, The Vicissitudes of Vivienne, was produced in Melbourne in 1908. This was followed the next year by a Sydney production of A Martyr to Principle, a production she wrote in collaboration with Stanley McKay. She was later described by a Sydney newspaper as being "the first woman dramatist to have a play produced in Australia by a commercial theatrical management". A stage version was also produced in 1917 by Bert Bailey.

The writer's reputation was enhanced by the publication in 1911 of Mum Dawson, 'Boss' , a series of inter-connected comic stories about a back-blocks country woman struggling to maintain her farm and her family, in the vein of Steele Rudd's iconic "Dad Rudd" from Dad and Dave. A stage production was created in 1917 by Bert Bailey. The Examiner described it as having "a strong vein of genuine humour". This was followed a year later by its sequel The Dawsons' Uncle George.

In 1912, Locke left Australia for England to work as a journalist and writer but returned to Australia in 1915 to nurse her sick mother. In 1916, she published her best known work, Samaritan Mary, in the United States. It received favourable reviews there, and "enjoyed a remarkable success".

Locke married a childhood friend, accountant Henry Logan Elliott, in January 1917. He was posted to the front some two weeks later, serving with the First Australian Imperial Force. Locke traveled to America later in 1917 to meet her New York publisher, but was unable to join her husband in Europe due to the closing of the Atlantic crossing. She returned to Australia and gave birth to a son, the playwright, Sumner Locke Elliott, on 17 October 1917. A day later, she died from complications of eclampsia arising from the birth.

On her death, The Leader newspaper described her as "a woman of great vitality and animation, a tireless worker, with much charm of manner and an abundance of humor".

== Works ==
=== Novels ===
- Mum Dawson, 'Boss' (1911)
- The Dawsons' Uncle George (1912)
- Skeeter Farm Takes a Spell (1915) illustrated by Lionel Lindsay
- Samaritan Mary (1916)

=== Drama ===
- The Vicissitudes of Vivienne (1908)
- A Martyr to Principle (1909) (written in collaboration with Stanley McKay
- Mum Dawson, Boss (1917) staged by Bert Bailey

=== Poetry ===
- In Memoriam: Sumner Locke (1921)
