= The Dingo (radio play) =

1940 radio play by Vance Palmer

Wireless Weekly 13 April 1940

The Dingo is a 1940 Australian radio play by Vance Palmer based on his short story of the same name.

Leslie Rees wrote the play "has much of Vance Palmer’s characteristic skill in dual plot-weaving, all his precise knowledge of people and places, his ability to avoid an obvious denouement, along with what some would say is a temperamental swerving from direct conflict. It is a play of symbol, a story-telling technique that the author has mastered."

Wireless Weekly said "Only once in a while comes a play as arresting and unusual as Vance Palmer’s “The Dingo,’’... Without flagrantly departing from orthodox play-form, it suggests something new in drama. It suggests that life itself can be drama, without laborious machinations and exploitation of the long arm of coincidence... A brief gem of a play."

The play was popular and was produced again in 1944. It was one of several Palmer stories set in Queensland.

== Premise ==
"Olsen, a lighthouse-keeper on the Queensland coast has been waiting up for his daughter. His dog sleeps at his feet. In the distance is a faint, dreamy boom of breakers on the river-bar, but gradually, penetrating this background of dull sound, comes the mournful howl of a dingo. In those few words, one has the chief symbols of the story, which parallels the behaviour of the dingo and Conolly, boat-owner and betrayer of women."
