= The Singing Gold =

1929 novel by Dorothy Cottrell

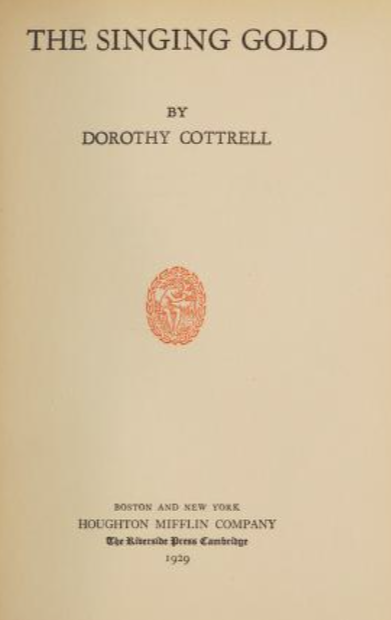
- Title page for The Singing Gold (1929)
- Author: Dorothy Cottrell
- Publisher: Houghton Mifflin Company
- Publication date: 1929
- Publication place: United States
- Media type: Print
- Pages: 298 pp.

The Singing Gold is the debut novel written by Australian author Dorothy Cottrell, first published by Hodder & Stoughton in the United Kingdom in 1928, and then by Houghton Mifflin in the United States in 1929.

The novel was initially serialised in the Ladies Home Journal in 1927, where it gained significant attention, but once published as a book became a top six bestseller of 1929.

The Oxford Companion to Australian Literature notes the novel "takes its title from the ground lark, an attractive, small, golden bird which flourishes in the open Queensland grasslands."

== Plot summary ==
Set in the Australian outback, The Singing Gold follows the journey of Joan Jerrington-Whatmore, a young woman who sets out on a 3000-mile sheep drive across regional Australia. In her review of the novel critic Jessica White that, "as in much Australian settler literature", there is a contrast "between the beauty and harshness of the landscape and its inhabitants".

== Critical reception ==
In Australia Mary Gilmore, a renowned Australian poet and writer, on reading The Singing Gold pronounced Cottrell "a genius". A review in The Bulletin noted that a reader should be grateful for "the comedy that permeates this story; and more so for the real and attractive picture of youth that is always to be perceived through the golden haze".

In New Zealand the Wairarapa Daily Times described the novel as being "as fresh and blithe and entertaining a story as has come out of Australia, or any other country, for a long while." And The Waikato Independent praised it for its authentic depictions of Australian bush life and having a strong, independent female protagonist.

== Publication history ==
After the novel's initial serialisation in the USA in Ladies Home Journal in 1927 it was reprinted as follows:

- Hodder & Stoughton, UK, 1928 and 1929
- Houghton Mifflin USA, 1929
- The Sydney Mail, serialised in 17 weekly instalments between 24 October 1928 to 13 February 1929
- Angus & Robertson, Australia, 1956
- Australian Women's Mirror, serialised between 25 November 1959 to 30 March 1960
