= Myra Morris =

Australian poet, novelist and writer for children

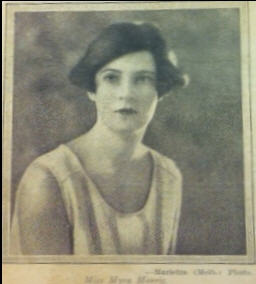
- Morris in 1927
- Born: Myra Evelyn Morris; 15 May 1893; Boort, Victoria, Australia
- Died: 18 August 1966 (aged 73); Frankston, Victoria, Australia
- Occupations: Poet, novelist and writer for children

Myra Morris (15 May 1893 – 18 August 1966) was an Australian poet, novelist, and writer for children.

== Life and writing career ==
Morris was born in the Victorian country town of Boort. Her English born father owned a series of grocery and produce stores in country towns and Morris spent her youth in a number of different locations. She attended school at Rochester Brigidine Convent where an English teacher encouraged her to write.

Morris began publishing poetry and short stories in various Australian newspapers and magazines in her early twenties, and her first volume of poetry England and Other Verses appeared in 1918. This was followed by her first novel for children in 1922, and her first for adults in 1929. She travelled to England in 1930, returning to settle with her family in Frankston on the Mornington Peninsula in Victoria where she remained for the rest of her life.

In 1928, E. M. England described her as: "Agog with the zest of youth, the sheer joy of living, she is essentially an outdoor girl. When she is not baking on the sands to the warm brown of an islander, she is looking out on ti-tree all day long, with the water just behind it, the sea which she says: 'I love so much that I just can't put it down in words.'"

Morris wrote for a large number of newspapers and periodicals and she was active in founding and organizing the Melbourne branch of P.E.N. International.

Chiefly known for her short stories, of which she wrote over 100, her only collection of such stories appeared in 1947. She was also a prolific poet with over 300 works to her name, and again, only two collections of these works have been published.

Morris died in Frankston in 1966 after suffering from Paget's disease of the bone.

== Bibliography ==
=== Novels ===
- Enchantment (1929)
- The Wind on the Water (1938)
- Dark Tumult (1939)

=== Poetry collections ===
- England and Other Verses (1918)
- White Magic (1929)

=== Short story collection ===
- The Township (1947)

=== Children's ===
- Us Five (1922)
- The Little English Girl (1934)
