= The Wells of Beersheba =

Book by Frank Dalby Davison

First edition

The Wells of Beersheba is a short romanticized account of the Battle of Beersheba, which took place on 31 October 1917 in Ottoman Palestine during the First World War between the attacking mounted infantry of Australia and New Zealand and the defending Ottoman garrison. It was written by the Australian author Frank Dalby Davison who was not present at the battle, but had been in the British cavalry during the war. Much of the book, which is more fictionalized reportage than novella, and in which no single character is drawn, reflects the codependency of horse and rider and the shock of battle.

It was originally published in Sydney in 1933 by Angus & Robertson under the title The Wells of Beersheba. An Epic of the Australian Light Horse 1914-1918, with illustrations by Will Mahoney.
