= Jean Devanny =

NZ/Australian writer and communist (1894–1962)

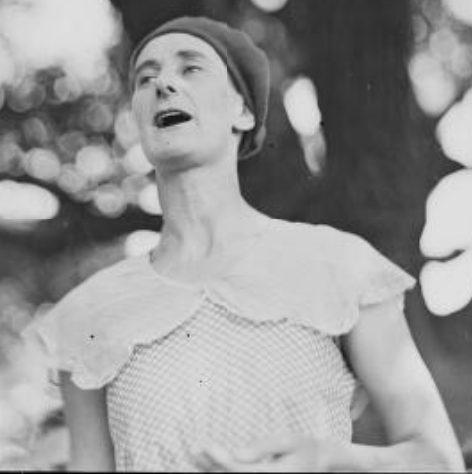
- Jean Devanny c. 1931
- Born: Jane Crook; 7 January 1894; Ferntown near Collingwood, New Zealand
- Died: 8 March 1962 (aged 68); Townsville, Queensland, Australia
- Occupation: writer
- Spouse: Francis Harold (Hal) Devanny
- Children: 3: Harold (Karl), Patricia, Erin
- Writing career
- Language: English

Jane (Jean) Devanny (7 January 1894 – 8 March 1962) was a New Zealand writer and communist. She was born to William and Jane Crook in Ferntown near Collingwood, in the Nelson district of New Zealand. She migrated to Australia in 1929, eventually moving to Townsville, in North Queensland, where she died at the age of 68.

She is best known for the novels Sugar Heaven and The Butcher Shop, but she also wrote short stories and political papers.

== Literary connections ==
Devanny was one of the founders of the Writers' League, along with Katharine Susannah Prichard and Egon Kisch. In 1935, she became the League's first president. The Writers' League became the Writer's Association in 1937.

She was a close friend and correspondent of Miles Franklin, Marjorie Barnard and Winifred Hamilton, and was in frequent contact with other Australian writers throughout the mid-20th Century.

In 1948, she approached Mary Gilmore to write a foreword to Travels in North Queensland, but Gilmore declined on the basis that Devanny should write it herself, because "I have written so many that I have decided not to write any more for a time, as they will have no value by now".

== Political activity ==
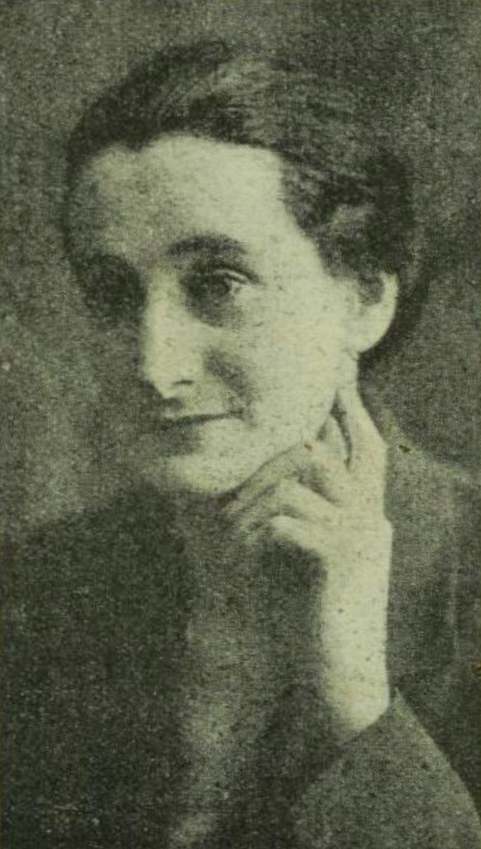
Devanny in 1930

Devanny joined the Communist Party of Australia in the early 1920s, and had a long-term affair with the general secretary Jack Miles; called "Leader" in her memoirs. Despite that, many in the party disagreed with her "forthright avant-garde views" and her candid discussion of sexual activities and women's sexuality. Devanny used her novels as a way of expressing ideological principles.

During the 1930s, she toured North Queensland to spread propaganda for the communist movement. Sugar Heaven was written during that period, drawing upon her experiences working as a domestic servant on a sugar plantation, and was intended to be a form of propaganda. Egon Kisch described the style of writing in Sugar Heaven as "reportage" or "fact in the form of fiction" .

Devanny had several disagreements with the leadership of the party that eventually led to her expulsion in 1940. She rejoined the party in 1944, but the party bureaucracy's treatment of her novel Cindie, also about the North Queensland sugar industry, provoked her final resignation in 1950. Despite the egalitarian ideals espoused by communist ideology, the party leadership was dominated by men, who often adhered to the idea that women's participation in politics should be restricted to a supporting role. Although she remained a staunch communist after leaving the Communist Party, she often expressed disagreement with other communists of the time, most notably Pablo Picasso, of whom she reportedly said: "Picasso hasn't got any political opinions. His work proves that. He's only got a sentimental attachment to the idea of social justice".

Despite decreasing her political activity in her later years, she continued to express her opinions on local, national and global political events and figures.

== Later years ==
Devanny later regretted using her novels as a way to convey ideology rather than trying to write to the best of her abilities. She noted: "I realise now that I have not exploited the small measure of ability for writing I possess one whit. I never really got down to it and THOUGHT. Thought was reserved for politics". Devanny moved to North Queensland during the 1940s and spent the last two decades of her life in the region, expanding her knowledge of the natural world, taking part in a number of anthropological expeditions along the coast of North Queensland. During the 1950s, she wrote many articles and stories documenting details about the region during the mid-20th century, focusing on a range of themes, such as the relations between White Australians and the Indigenous inhabitants.

Devanny died in Townsville on 8 March 1962, having been diagnosed with chronic leukaemia. Her remains were cremated in Rockhampton. Her daughter Pat also became a communist activist.

== Records and collections ==
The Eddie Koiki Mabo Library at James Cook University, Townsville, holds copies of all of Devanny's published works in its North Queensland Collection. Many of Devanny's private papers, consisting of drafts of speeches, published and unpublished articles, personal communications, and letters, are held in that library's special collections.

== Bibliography ==
=== Novels ===
- The Butcher Shop (1926)
- Lenore Divine (1926)
- Dawn Beloved (1928)
- Riven (1929)
- Devil Made saint (1930)
- Bushman Burke (1930) (aka Taipo)
- Poor Swine (1932)
- Out of Such Fires (1934)
- The Virtuous Courtesan (1935)
- The Ghost Wife (1935)
- Sugar Heaven (1936)
- Paradise Flow (1938)
- The Killing of Jacqueline Love (1942)
- Roll Back the Night (1945)
- Cindie : A Chronicle of the Canefields (1949)

=== Short story collection ===
- Old Savage : And Other Stories (1927)

=== Non-fiction ===
- By Tropic Sea and Jungle : Adventures in North Queensland (1944) – travel
- Bird of Paradise (1945) – biography
- Travels in North Queensland (1951) – travel
- Point of Departure: The Autobiography of Jean Devanny (1987) – autobiography
