= Coonardoo =

1929 novel by Katharine Susannah Prichard

Coonardoo: The Well in the Shadow
- First edition
- Author: Katharine Susannah Prichard
- Language: English
- Genre: Novel
- Publisher: Jonathan Cape, England
- Publication date: 1929
- Publication place: Australia
- Media type: Print (Hardback & Paperback)
- Pages: 320 pp
- ISBN: 0-207-12661-5 (1973 Angus and Robertson edition)
- OCLC: 1133739

Coonardoo: The Well in the Shadow is a novel written by the Australian author Katharine Susannah Prichard. The novel evocatively depicts the Australian landscape as it was in the late 1920s, in an age when white settlers tried to control more and more of the bare plains of northwest Australia.

Originally submitted to The Bulletin novel competition in 1928 under the pseudonym Ashburton Jim, this novel was joint winner. It shared the award with A House is Built by M. Barnard Eldershaw.

It was first serialised in The Bulletin magazine in 15 weekly instalments from 5 September 1928.

== Plot ==
The novel relates the story of the titular character, an Aboriginal woman who was prepared since her childhood to be Wytaliba station's housekeeper, but falls in love and has a romance with her owner Hugh Watt, a white man.
