= The Passage (Palmer novel) =

1930 Australian novel by Vance Palmer

- Author: Vance Palmer
- Language: English
- Publisher: Stanley Paul, England
- Publication date: 1930
- Publication place: Australia
- Media type: Print (Hardback and Paperback)
- Pages: 288
- Preceded by: Men are Human
- Followed by: Daybreak

The Passage (1930) is a novel by Australian author Vance Palmer. It won the ALS Gold Medal for Best Novel in 1930.

== Plot summary ==
The novel is set in a small fishing village on the coast of Queensland, known as "The Passage", and centres around the affairs of the Callaways, original pioneers in the area. The tranquility of this unspoilt, idyllic location is endangered by Vic Osborne, a developer who threatens to urbanize "The Passage".

== Notes ==
- Dedication: To Nettie Palmer
- The novel was serialised in The Bulletin magazine in weekly installments from 16 April to 30 June 1930.

== Reviews ==
- John K. Ewers, writing in The West Australian stated that "The author has sliced a portion out of the coast of Queensland and given it permanence...the characters live in the atmosphere of The Passage. The book is soaked with it. Long association with the water has identified them with the marine life. Their thoughts are coloured by their relation to it. There are, too, many memorable and beautiful pictures of the seascape, the ocean in its varying moods, the sky, the sun, the work among the mullet, all of which leave the reader with an impression of actual contact."
- In a profile of the author, three years after the book's publication, a writer in The Age noted that with this book "he gave the world a glorious piece of smooth and faultless narrative, enriched and embellished by a wealth of incident and scene, the telling of which rivals some of the best descriptive passages in English prose."

== Awards and nominations ==
- 1929 winner Bulletin Novel Competition
- 1930 winner ALS Gold Medal
