= John Arthur Barry =

Journalist and author

- Born: 1850; Torquay, Devon, England
- Died: 23 September 1911 (aged 60–61); North Sydney, New South Wales, Australia
- Occupations: journalist and author
- Writing career
- Language: English
- Years active: 1882–1907

John Arthur Barry (1850 – 23 September 1911) was a journalist and author.

Barry was born in Torquay, Devonshire, England, in 1850. He moved to Australia in the 1870s.

He returned to shipboard life around 1877 along the east coast of Australia for about two years.

Barry died in Sydney on 23 September 1911 of chronic myocarditis.

== Bibliography ==
=== Novels ===
- The Luck of the Native Born (1898)
- A Son of the Sea (1899)

=== Short story collections ===
- Steve Brown's Bunyip and Other Stories (1893)
- In the Great Deep: Tales of the Sea (1896)
- Against the Tides of Fate (1899)
- Red Lion and Blue Star (1902)
- Sea Yarns (1910)
- South Sea Shipmates (1913)
