= A House Is Built =

1929 novel by M. Barnard Eldershaw

A House is Built
- Cover of the US edition - published by Harcourt, Brace and Company
- Author: M. Barnard Eldershaw
- Language: English
- Genre: Novel
- Publisher: George G. Harrap and Co.
- Publication date: June 1929
- Publication place: England
- Media type: Print (hardback)
- Pages: 359pp
- ISBN: 0-7270-0970-2
- OCLC: 27538444

A House is Built (1929) is the first novel of M. Barnard Eldershaw, the joint pseudonym of Marjorie Barnard and Flora Eldershaw.

It is a family saga, centred around mid-nineteenth century Sydney. It was written as a result of their seeing an advertisement for The Bulletin prize. The novel won this prize in 1928, shared with Katharine Susannah Prichard's Coonardoo. It was originally serialised in abridged form in The Bulletin under the title, The Quartermaster.

== Plot ==
The novel centres on James Hyde and his family. A former Royal Navy quartermaster, in 1837 Hyde sets up a business in early Sydney, inspired by the potential for commerce he sees in new country. He brings with him his young adult children, William, Fanny and Maud. As the novel develops and family fortunes rise, both William and Maud are able to find places for themselves in Sydney society: Maud as the happy mother of a growing family, William as the partner in his father's business. Yet Fanny, hampered by patriarchy and her father and brother's expectations of her femininity, is unable to take on the role in the family business she craves and struggles to find a sense of purpose. Her struggle is echoed in the story of William's wife, Adela, who experiences a loss of agency in her wifely role - a dynamic that fatefully shapes her relationships with her sons, fracturing her relationship with the Hyde's heir, James, and leading to a possessive co-dependence with the second son, Lionel.

The family fortunes grow as the city develops, with historical events such as the Australian gold-fields shaping the narrative and setting of the novel. However, ultimately the family comes dramatically undone, culminating in tragedy.
