= T. Inglis Moore =

Australian writer, critic and editor (1901–1978)

- Born: Tom Inglis Moore; 28 September 1901; Camden, New South Wales
- Died: 23 July 1978 (aged 76); Canberra, A.C.T.
- Occupations: writer, anthologist and academic
- Writing career
- Language: English
- Years active: 1930-1978

T. Inglis Moore (1901–1978) was an Australian writer, anthologist and academic who was born in Camden, New South Wales.

Moore was the fifth of seven children and was educated at Sydney Grammar School and University of Sydney where he received a B.A. in 1923, graduating with first-class honours in English, history and philosophy. He was awarded a James King of Irrawang travelling scholarship and studied politics, philosophy and economics at The Queen's College, Oxford receiving a B.A. in 1926 and an M.A. in 1933. In 1927 he married Peace Flavelle Little stepsister/cousin of Elaine Marjory Little they had one child Pacita in 1934

Moore taught in universities in Iowa and the Philippines before returning to Sydney in 1931, where he taught at the university. From 1934 to 1940 he was a leader-writer and literary reviewer for The Sydney Morning Herald, before enlisting in the Australian Imperial Force in July 1940. After the war he taught at Canberra University College, which was later amalgamated with the Australian National University. In 1956 he was elected inaugural chair of the Commonwealth Council of the Fellowship of Australian Writers. He was promoted to associate professor in 1959, and retired in 1966.

Moore was a member of the advisory board of the Commonwealth Literary Fund from 1945 to 1971 and was a passionate supporter of Australian literature. During his working life he published collections of poetry, gave talks for the Australian Broadcasting Commission on literary topics, wrote reviews and critical articles, and edited anthologies of Australian short stories and poetry.

He died in Canberra in 1978.

== Bibliography ==
=== Novels ===
- Moore, T. Inglis (1935). The half way sun : a tale of the Philippine Islands. Sydney: Angus & Robertson.

=== Poetry ===
Collections

- Adagio in Blue : Poems (1938)
- Emu Parade : Poems from Camp (1941)
- Bayonet and Glass (1957)

=== Edited anthologies ===
- Best Australian One-Act Plays (1937) compiled with William Moore
- Australian Poetry, 1946 (1946) poetry anthology
- Australia Writes (1953) poetry and fiction anthology
- Selected Poems of Henry Kendall (1957)
- Henry Kendall (1963) poetry of Henry Kendall
- From the Ballads to Brennan (1964) poetry anthology

=== Non-fiction ===
- Six Australian Poets (1942) criticism and biography
- The Misfortunes of Henry Handel Richardson (1957) criticism
- Mary Gilmore : A Tribute (1965) edited with Barrie Ovenden and Dymphna Cusack
- Rolf Boldrewood (1968) biography
- Social Patterns in Australian Literature (1971) criticism
- Letters of Mary Gilmore (1980) edited with W. H. Wilde
- The Australia Book : The Portrait of a Nation by Our Greatest Writers (1982)

== Drama ==
- *We're Going Through (1943)

== Readings ==
Inglis Moore conducted two poetry readings of his works that were recorded. One in 1959, and the other in 1967. These recordings can be found at the National Library of Australia.
