= Katharine Susannah Prichard =

Australian fiction writer and dramatist

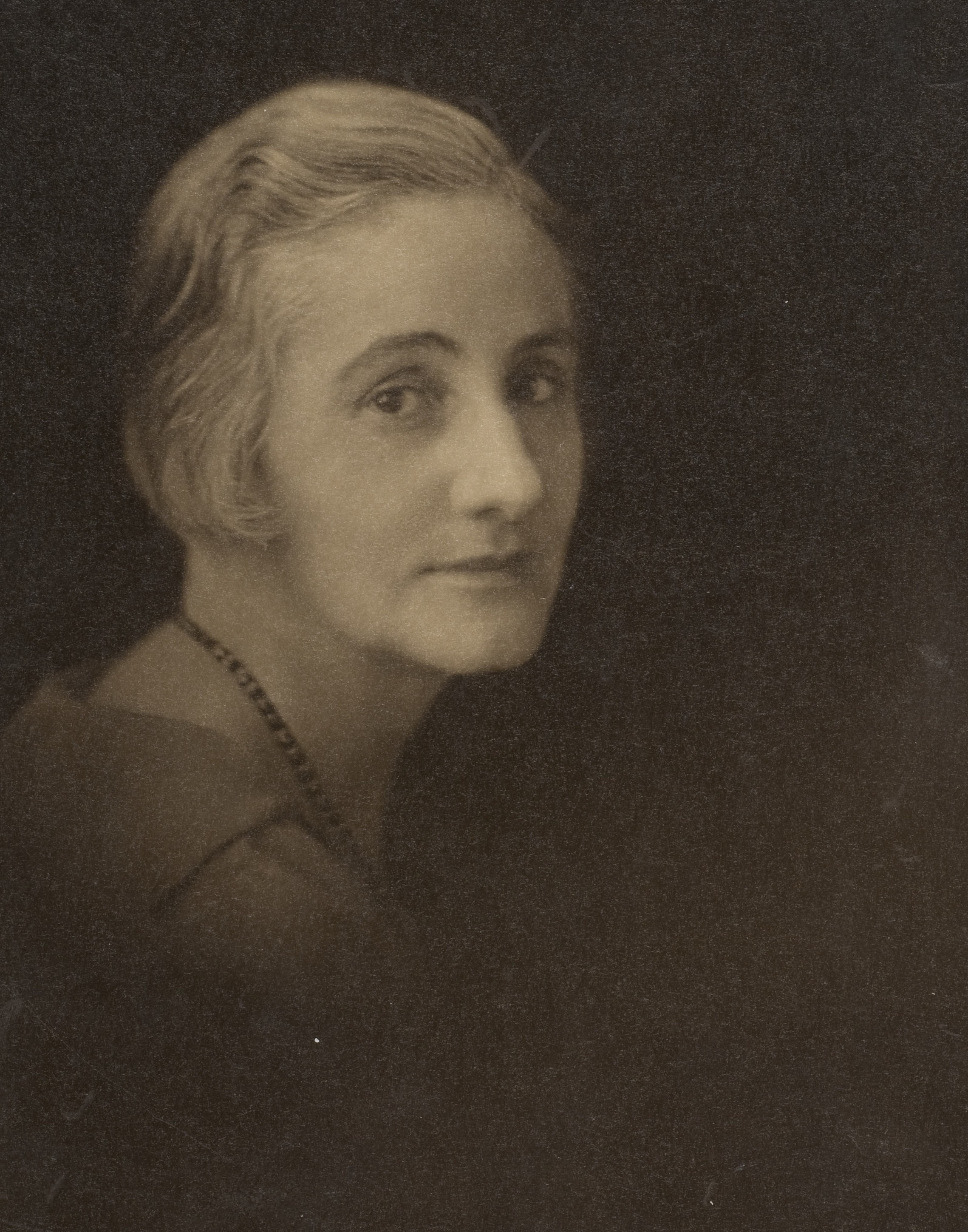
- Katharine Susannah Prichard, Sydney, 1927-1928, May Moore
- Born: 4 December 1883; Levuka, Colony of Fiji
- Died: 2 October 1969 (aged 85); Greenmount, Western Australia
- Citizenship: Australian
- Occupations: writer and political activist
- Spouse: Hugo Throssell (m. 1919; died 1933)
- Children: Ric Throssell
- Writing career
- Notable works: Coonardoo, 1929; Golden Miles, 1948; Winged Seeds, 1950
- Notable awards: World Council Peace Medal 1959

Katharine Susannah Prichard (4 December 1883 – 2 October 1969) was an Australian author and co-founding member of the Communist Party of Australia.

== Early life ==
Prichard was born in Levuka, Fiji in 1883 to Australian parents. She spent her childhood in Launceston, Tasmania, then moved to Melbourne, where she earned a scholarship to South Melbourne College. Her father, Tom Prichard, was editor of the Melbourne Sun newspaper. She was a governess and journalist in Victoria, then travelled to England in 1908.

Her first novel, The Pioneers (1915), won the Hodder & Stoughton All Empire Literature Prize.

After her return to Australia, the romance Windlestraws and her first novel of a mining community, Black Opal, were published.

== Political life and marriage ==
Prichard moved with her husband, war hero Hugo "Jim" Throssell, VC, to Greenmount, Western Australia, in 1920 where she lived for much of the rest of her life. She wrote some of her later novels and stories in a weatherboard workroom near the house. In her personal life she usually referred to herself as Mrs Hugo Throssell. Her friends called her Kattie. They had a son, Ric Throssell, later a diplomat and writer.

Prichard was a founding member of the Communist Party of Australia in 1921 and remained a member for the rest of her life. She worked to organise unemployed workers and founded left-wing women's groups. With the trade unionist Cecelia Moore Shelley, she helped organise unemployed workers and co-founded several left-wing women's groups in Perth, including the Unemployed Girls and Women's Defence Committee (1932), the International Women's Day Committee (1936), and the Modern Women's Club (1938).

She campaigned in the 1930s in support of the Spanish Republic and other left-wing causes. Although she had frequent arguments with other Communist writers such as Frank Hardy and Judah Waten over the correct application of the doctrine of socialist realism to Australian fiction, she remained supportive of the Soviet Union and its cultural policies when many other intellectuals, such as Eric Lambert and Stephen Murray-Smith, left the party in the 1950s. Her public position as a communist and a female writer saw her harassed by Western Australian police and the federal government throughout her life. The official surveillance files opened on Prichard in 1919 were not closed until her death in 1969.

Prichard's commitment to her politics and her position as a woman in the public sphere also saw her socially isolated by the conservative social groups which dominated Perth in this period. She was the subject of constant rumours and frequent anonymous tip offs to Western Australian police of any communist activity. She was also part of a new community of free thinking public intellectuals who, among other things, challenged notions of acceptable sexuality.

Her two major novels, which were to give her national and international prominence, written in Western Australia in the early years of her marriage, were Working Bullocks (1926) which dramatised the physical and emotional traumas of timber workers in the karri country of Australia's south-west, and Coonardoo (1929), a novel which became notorious for its candid portrayal of relationships between white men and Australian Aboriginal women in the north-west.

The far north-west of Australia provided inspiration and setting for her daring play Brumby Innes.

Most of the short stories in the first of her four collections, Kiss on the Lips (1932), were also from the 1920s. During this period, she wrote novels, stories and plays.

== Death of husband ==
While she was visiting the Soviet Union in 1933, her husband Jim Throssell committed suicide when his business failed during the Great Depression.

In 1934 her membership of the Communist Party of Australia and the Movement Against War and Fascism led her to lead the Egon Kisch welcome committee, which rapidly metamorphosed into a committee to defend Kisch from exclusion from Australia.

The novel Intimate Strangers (1937) was a turning point in her life. She had left the initial draft of the novel with her husband while she travelled to Russia collecting material for a new work. After his suicide, and her return to Australia, she changed a major incident in the novel – the suicide of a main character – as she feared that the novel may have influenced her husband.

== Goldfields trilogy ==
Her extended work The Goldfields Trilogy – The Roaring Nineties (1946), Golden Miles (1948), and Winged Seeds (1950) is a notable reconstruction of social and personal histories in Western Australia's goldfields from the 1890s to 1946.

Her autobiography Subtle Flame, published a few years before her death, exhibited the complex legacy she left behind.

Prichard died at her home in Greenmount in 1969. Her ashes were scattered on the surrounding hills.

Her son Ric Throssell committed suicide when his wife Dodie died in 1999. He had fought for many years to clear his name, after being accused of passing classified information to his mother, or actively spying for the Soviet Union. His 1989 book covering this was called My Father's Son.

The centenary of Prichard's birth was celebrated by UWA academics in a collection of essays.

== Legacy ==
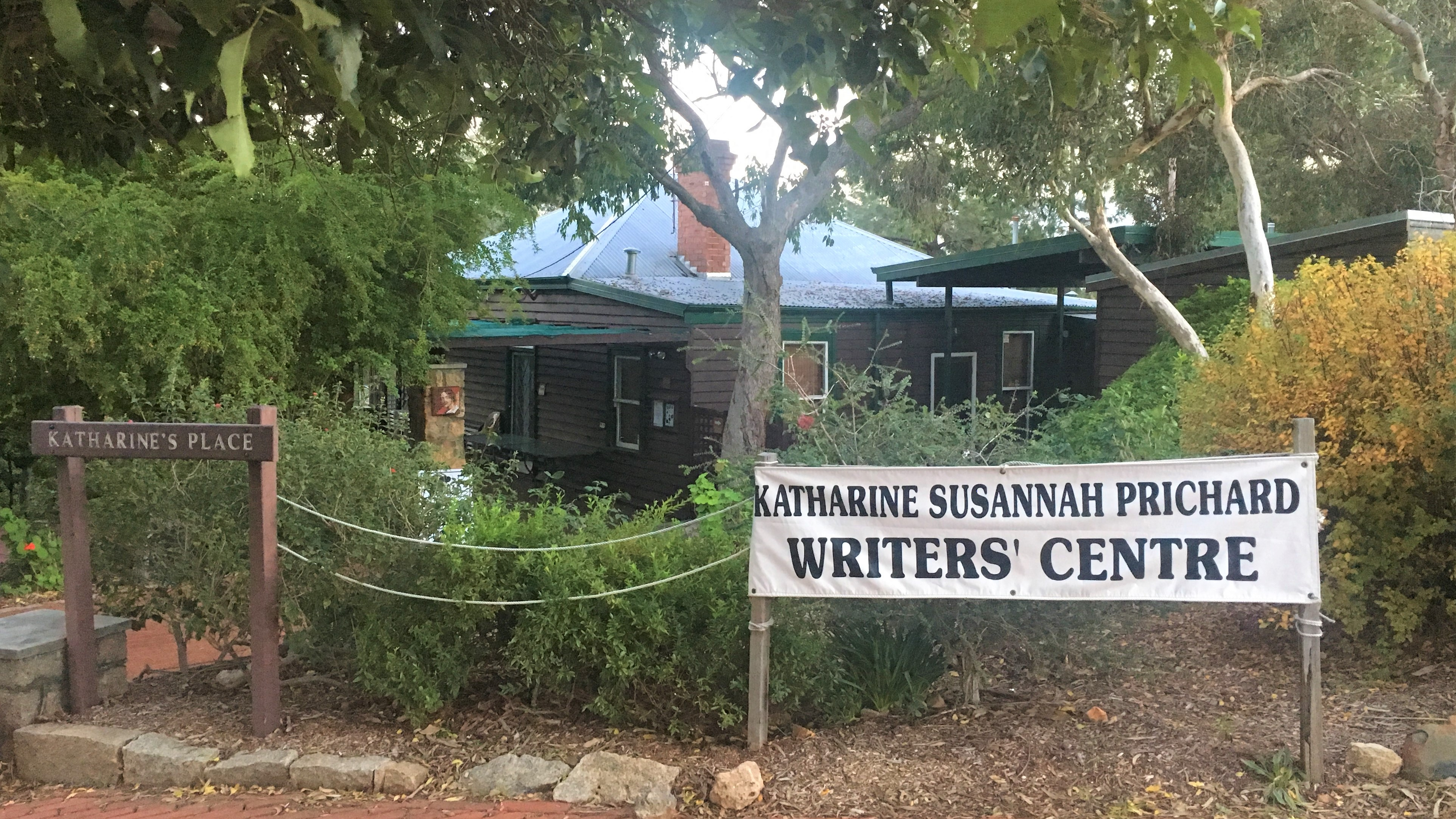
Katharine Prichard Writers' Centre, Greenmount

The home has now become the Katharine Susannah Prichard Writers' Centre, a foundation promoting humanitarianism, the study of Katharine Susannah Prichard, and encouraging writing in Western Australia, where Prichard spent most of her life.

The Shire of Mundaring public library branch in Greenmount is named after her as well.

The 1996 Australian film Shine depicts the close correspondence between Prichard and Australian pianist David Helfgott. She was played by Googie Withers. Prichard helped to raise money for Helfgott, to enable him to go to London to study music.

A house at Abbotsleigh, a private school on Sydney's North Shore, has been named after her.

== Works ==
=== Novels ===
- The Pioneers (1915) – filmed in 1916 by Franklyn Barrett and 1926 by Raymond Longford
- Windlestraws (1916)
- Black Opal (1921)
- Working Bullocks (1926)
- The Wild Oats of Han (1928) – illustrated by Elizabeth Powell
- Coonardoo (1929)
- Haxby's Circus (1930)
- Intimate Strangers (1939; the basis of a 1981 miniseries)
- Moon of Desire (1941)
- The Roaring Nineties (1946)
- Golden Miles (1948)
- Winged Seeds (1950)
- Subtle Flame (1967)

=== Short story collections ===
- Kiss on the Lips and Other Stories (1932)
- Potch and Colour (1944)
- N'Goola and other Stories (1959)
- Tribute : Selected Stories of Katherine Susannah Prichard (1988) edited by Ric Throssell

=== Drama ===
- Brumby Innes (1929)
  - the basis of a 1973 television film
- Bid Me to Love (1929)

=== Reportage ===
- The Real Russia (1934)

=== Poetry ===
- Clovelly Verses (1913)
- The Earth Lover and Other Verses (1932)

=== Autobiography ===
- Child of the hurricane, (1964)

=== Selection from collected works ===
- On Strenuous wings (1965)
