= Vance Palmer =

Australian writer

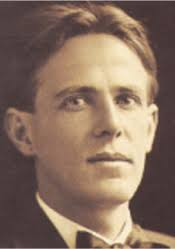
- Born: Edward Vivian Palmer; 28 August 1885; Bundaberg, Queensland
- Died: 15 July 1959 (aged 73); Kew, Victoria, Australia
- Spouse: Nettie Palmer
- Children: 2
- Writing career
- Language: English
- Period: 1903–1959
- Notable works: The Legend of the Nineties (1954), The Big Fellow (1959)

Edward Vivian "Vance" Palmer (28 August 1885 – 15 July 1959) was an Australian novelist, dramatist, essayist and critic.

== Early life ==
Vance Palmer was born in Bundaberg, Queensland, on 28 August 1885 and attended the Ipswich Grammar School. With no university in Queensland, he studied contemporary Australian writing at the intellectual hub in Brisbane at the time, the School of Arts, following the work of A. G. Stephens. Working in various jobs, he took a position as a tutor at Abbieglassie cattle station, 800 kilometres (500 mi) west of Brisbane in the 'back of beyond'. He also worked as a manager: at that time there was a large Aboriginal population with whom he both worked and celebrated, attending their frequent corroborrees. It was here his love of the land and environmental awareness was honed, and so too was his interest in white-black relationships. From his early years he was determined to be a writer, and in 1905 and again in 1910 he went to London, then the centre of Australia's cultural universe, to learn his craft and advance his prospects. He was acknowledged as an expert on foreign affairs – in Mexico and Ireland. His association with Alfred Orage and his work for The New Age and other guild socialists greatly influenced his political outlook.

Palmer met his future wife, Janet (Nettie) Higgins, in Melbourne in 1909. They were married in London in 1914 and were on holiday in France when World War I broke out. They went back to London where their elder daughter Aileen was born in 1915. Later that year, they returned to Australia and settled in Melbourne. Their second daughter, Helen, was born there in 1917. Vance and Nettie campaigned against the Hughes government's attempt to introduce conscription into Australia. In 1918, Palmer enlisted in the First Australian Imperial Force and was sent back to Europe, but the war ended before he saw service. He was discharged from the army late in 1919.

== Writing career and later life ==
Both Vance and Nettie had begun to publish poetry, short stories, criticism and journalism before the war, but in the 1920s, living in the fishing village of Caloundra, Queensland, to save money, they dedicated themselves to literature full-time. Palmer published his first novel in 1920, and a well-received play, The Black Horse, in 1924. His best novels of this period were The Man Hamilton (1928), Men Are Human (1930), The Passage (1930) and The Swayne Family (1934).

During World War II Vance and Nettie were strongly opposed to the advent of fascism, whether in Australia or overseas. Because they had witnessed the loss of democratic rights during the Great War their work was to strengthen the Australian belief in egalitarianism. Palmer published a series of historical and biographical works: National Portraits (1941), A G Stephens: His Life and Work (1941), Frank Wilmot (1942) and Louis Esson and the Australian Theatre (1948).

In the postwar years Palmer wrote a trilogy – Golconda (1948), Seedtime (1957) and The Big Fellow (1959), based loosely on the life of the Queensland politician Ted Theodore. The trilogy met a poor critical reception. While today his novels are out of print, many of his short stories are still read and reissued. The Big Fellow won him a posthumous Miles Franklin Award.

In 1954 Palmer published The Legend of the Nineties, a critical study of the development of the nationalist tradition in Australian literature usually associated with The Bulletin. This is perhaps his best-remembered work.

Vance and Nettie were remembered by those who knew them for their great compassion and generosity. They were instrumental in the recognition of Australian literature as a subject worthy of serious study and teaching in the academy. During the last decades of his life Vance is remembered for his regular radio broadcasts on books and writing. Vance and Nettie's last years were clouded by their own ill health and by worry about their daughter Aileen, who suffered a mental breakdown in 1948 and became an alcoholic. A member of the advisory board for the early Australia Council Palmer was attacked as a Communist "fellow traveler" (which to some extent he was) during the McCarthyist period of the 1950s, but his integrity was recognised by the deeply conservative Prime Minister of that era, Sir Robert Menzies. Vance died from heart disease in 1959.

The Victorian Premier's Literary Award for fiction is named the Vance Palmer Prize, while the prize for non-fiction is the Nettie Palmer Prize (until 2010 when under the stewardship of the Wheeler Centre they were renamed as Victorian Premier's Prizes).

== Bibliography ==
=== Novels ===
- The Shantykeeper's Daughter (1920)
- The Boss of Killara (1922)
- The Enchanted Island : A Novel (1923)
- The Outpost (1924)
- Cronulla : A Story of Station Life (1924)
- Secret Harbor (1925)
- Spinifex (1927)
- The Man Hamilton (1928)
- Men Are Human (1930)
- The Passage (1930)
- Daybreak (1932)
- The Swayne Family (1934)
- Legend For Sanderson (1937)
- Cyclone (1947)
- Golconda (1948)
- Seedtime (1957)
- The Big Fellow (1959)

=== Short story collections ===
- The World of Men (1915)
- Separate Lives (1931)
- Sea and Spinifex (1934)
- Let the Birds Fly (1955)
- The Rainbow-Bird and Other Stories (1957) compiled by Allan Edwards
- The Brand of the Wild and Early Sketches (2002)

=== Poetry collections ===
- The Forerunners (1915)
- The Camp (1920)

=== Poetry anthology ===
- Old Australian Bush Ballads (1950) with Margaret Sutherland (composer)

=== Drama ===
- The Black Horse and Other Plays (1924)
- The Black Horse (1937)
- Telling Mrs Barker (1937)
- The Sea Hawk (1938)
- The Dingo (1940)
- The Interloper (1940)
- Ancestors (1943)
- Hail Tomorrow (1947)
- Christine (1948)
- Two Worlds (1952)

=== Non-fiction ===
- National Portraits (1940)
- A.G. Stephens : His Life and Work by A. G. Stephens (1941) edited by Vance Palmer
- Louis Esson and the Australian Theatre by Louis Esson, edited by Vance Palmer (1948)
- The Legend of the Nineties (1954)
- Intimate Portraits and Other Pieces : Essays and Articles (1969) compiled by Harry Payne Heseltine
- Letters of Vance and Nettie Palmer 1915-1963 (1977). Edited by Vivian Smith.

=== Selected list of poems ===
Title	Year	First published	Reprinted/collected in
"The Farmer Remembers the Somme"	1920	Birth : A Little Journal of Australian Poetry April 1920	The Camp, Sydney J. Endacott, 1920, pp. 25
