= 1960 in Australian literature =

This article presents a list of the historical events and publications of Australian literature during 1960.

== Events ==
- The first Adelaide Writers' Week was held as part of the Adelaide Festival of Arts.

== Major publications ==
=== Books ===
- Thea Astley – A Descant for Gossips
- Russell Braddon – The Proud American Boy
- Nancy Cato – Green Grows the Vine
- Jon Cleary – North from Thursday
- Charmian Clift – Walk to the Paradise Gardens
- Nino Culotta – Cop this Lot
- Catherine Gaskin – Corporation Wife
- Elizabeth Harrower – The Catherine Wheel
- George Johnston – Closer to the Sun
- Elizabeth O'Conner – The Irishman
- Nevil Shute – Trustee from the Toolroom
- Arthur Upfield – Valley of Smugglers

=== Short stories ===
- James Aldridge – Gold and Sand : Stories
- Ion Idriess – The Wild North
- Hal Porter – "Party 42 and Mrs Brewer"

=== Children's and Young Adult fiction ===
- Nan Chauncy – Tangara
- John Gunn
  - The Humpy in the Hills
  - Peter Kent's Command
- Elyne Mitchell – Silver Brumby's Daughter
- Eleanor Spence – Lillipilly Hill
- Judith Wright – The Day the Mountains Played
- Patricia Wrightson – The Rocks of Honey

=== Poetry ===
- Christopher Brennan – The Verse of Christopher Brennan, edited by A. R. Chisholm and John Joseph Quinn
- David Campbell
  - "Town Planning"
  - "Under the Wattles"
  - "Windy Nights"
- Rosemary Dobson – "Ghost Town : New England"
- Geoffrey Dutton – Night Fishing
- R. D. Fitzgerald – "Bog and Candle"
- Gwen Harwood
  - "The Glass Jar"
  - "Group from Tartarus"
- A. D. Hope
  - "The Coasts of Cerigo"
  - Poems
- Colin Thiele – Man in a Landscape
- Roland Robinson – "Mapooram"
- Judith Wright – Australian Bird Poems

=== Drama ===
- Alan Seymour – The One Day of the Year

=== Non-fiction ===
- F. J. Thwaites – Press on Regardless (travel book)

== Awards and honours ==
=== Literary ===
Award	Author	Title	Publisher
ALS Gold Medal	William Hart-Smith	Poems of Discovery	Angus and Robertson
Miles Franklin Award	Elizabeth O'Conner	The Irishman	Angus and Robertson

=== Children and Young Adult ===
Award	Category	Author	Title	Publisher
Children's Book of the Year Award	Older Readers	Kylie Tennant, illustrated by Clem Seale	All the Proud Tribesmen	Macmillan

=== Poetry ===
Award	Author	Title	Publisher
Grace Leven Prize for Poetry	Colin Thiele	Man in a Landscape	Rigby

== Births ==
A list, ordered by date of birth (and, if the date is either unspecified or repeated, ordered alphabetically by surname) of births in 1960 of Australian literary figures, authors of written works or literature-related individuals follows, including year of death.

- 25 February – Narelle Oliver, award-winning children's author-illustrator, artist and print maker (died 2016)
- 4 August – Tim Winton, novelist
- 9 November – Michael Robotham, novelist

Unknown date

- Pamela Freeman, novelist
- Margo Lanagan, novelist and short story writer
- Fiona McIntosh, novelist

== Deaths ==
A list, ordered by date of death (and, if the date is either unspecified or repeated, ordered alphabetically by surname) of deaths in 1960 of Australian literary figures, authors of written works or literature-related individuals follows, including year of birth.

- 12 January – Nevil Shute, novelist (born 1899)
- 14 June – E. V. Timms, novelist (born 1895)
- 6 November — John Lavington Bonython, newspaper editor and journalist (born 1875)

== See also ==
- 1960 in Australia
- 1960 in literature
- 1960 in poetry
- List of years in Australian literature
- List of years in literature
