= 1958 in Australian literature =

This article presents a list of the historical events and publications of Australian literature during 1958.

== Books ==
- Thea Astley – Girl with a Monkey
- Nancy Cato – All the Rivers Run
- Catherine Gaskin – Blake's Reach
- Frank Hardy – The Four-Legged Lottery
- Elizabeth Harrower – The Long Prospect
- Christopher Koch – The Boys in the Island
- Eric Lambert – The Dark Backward
- Hal Porter – A Handful of Pennies
- Olaf Ruhen – Naked Under Capricorn
- Nevil Shute – The Rainbow and the Rose
- Dal Stivens – The Wide Arch
- Randolph Stow – To the Islands
- E. V. Timms – Robina
- Morris West – The Backlash (aka The Second Victory)

== Short stories ==
- A. Bertram Chandler – "Planet of Ill Repute"
- Peter Cowan – The Unploughed Land : Stories
- Frank Hardy – "The Crookest Raffle Ever Run in Australia"
- Roland Robertson – Black-Feller, White-Feller
- Judith Wright
  - "The Colour of Death"
  - "The Lame Duck"

== Children's and Young Adult fiction ==
- Nan Chauncy – Devil's Hill
- John Gunn – Sea Menace
- Elyne Mitchell – The Silver Brumby
- Mary Elwyn Patchett
  - The Brumby
  - The Mysterious Pool
- Eleanor Spence – Patterson's Track
- Judith Wright – Kings of the Dingoes

== Poetry ==
- Bruce Beaver – "White Cat and Brown Girl"
- David Campbell
  - "Hear the Bird of Day"
  - "On the Birth of a Son"
  - "Prayer for Rain"
- Geoffrey Dutton – Antipodes in Shoes
- R. D. Fitzgerald – "The Wind at Your Door"
- Max Harris – "A Window at Night"
- James McAuley – "In a Late Hour"
- David Martin – Poems of David Martin, 1938-1958
- Ian Mudie – "The North-Bound Rider"
- David Rowbotham – Inland : Poems
- Randolph Stow
  - "The Embarkation"
  - "In Praise of Hillbillies"
- John Thompson – The Penguin Book of Australian Verse, edited with Kenneth Slessor and R. G. Howarth
- Francis Webb
  - "Five Days Old"
  - "The Sea"

== Biography ==
- Russell Braddon – End of a Hate
- Ion Idriess – Back o' Cairns
- Elizabeth O'Conner – Steak for Breakfast
- Arthur Mailey – 10 for 66 and All That

== Non-fiction ==
- Don Bradman – The Art of Cricket

== Awards and honours ==
=== Literary ===
Award	Author	Title	Publisher
ALS Gold Medal	Not awarded		
Miles Franklin Award	Randolph Stow	To the Islands	Macdonald

=== Children's and Young Adult ===
Award	Category	Author	Title	Publisher
Children's Book of the Year Award	Older Readers	Nan Chauncy	Tiger in the Bush	Oxford University Press
Children's Book of the Year Award	Picture Book	Axel Poignant	Piccaninny Walkabout	Angus and Robertson

=== Poetry ===
Award	Author	Title	Publisher
Grace Leven Prize for Poetry	Geoffrey Dutton	Antipodes in Shoes	Edwards and Shaw

== Births ==
A list, ordered by date of birth (and, if the date is either unspecified or repeated, ordered alphabetically by surname) of births in 1958 of Australian literary figures, authors of written works or literature-related individuals follows, including year of death.

- 6 March – Paul Hetherington, poet
- 6 April – Graeme Base, artist and writer for children
- 16 June – Isobelle Carmody, novelist
- 19 September – Sandra Harvey, journalist and true crime writer (died 2008)
- 11 November – Kathy Lette, novelist
- 17 December – Christopher Kelen, novelist and poet

Unknown date

- Debra Adelaide, novelist
- Sarah Day, poet
- Lionel Fogarty, poet (died 2026)
- Steven Herrick, poet
- Kathleen Stewart, novelist and poet

== Deaths ==
A list, ordered by date of death (and, if the date is either unspecified or repeated, ordered alphabetically by surname) of deaths in 1958 of Australian literary figures, authors of written works or literature-related individuals follows, including year of birth.

- 4 January – Philip Lindsay, historical novelist (died in England) (born 1906)
- 17 February – Hugh McCrae, poet (born 1876)
- 8 April – Ethel Turner, novelist (born 1870)
- 2 July – Mary Grant Bruce, novelist (born 1878)
- 4 August — Ethel Anderson, poet (born 1883)
- 26 September – Arthur Bayldon, poet (born 1865)

== See also ==
- 1958 in Australia
- 1958 in literature
- 1958 in poetry
- List of years in Australian literature
- List of years in literature
