= José Ramón =

José Ramón is a Spanish given name. It may refer to:

- José Ramón (footballer, born 1968), Spanish footballer
- José Ramón (footballer, born 1987), Spanish footballer
- José Ramón Alexanko (born 1956), Spanish footballer
- Jose Ramon Aliling, Filipino civil engineer and businessman
- José Ramón Araneda (1887-?), Chilean politician
- José Ramón Balaguer Cabrera (born 1932), Cuban politician
- José Ramón Barreto (born 1991), Venezuelan entertainer
- José Ramón Basavilbaso (1764-1840), Argentine politician
- José Ramón Bauzà (born 1970), Spanish politician
- José Ramón Cantero Elvira (born 1993), Spanish swimmer
- José Ramón Carabante (born 1952), Spanish businessman
- José Ramón Corchado (born 1957), Spanish footballer and manager
- José Ramón Cossío (born 1960), Mexican jurist
- José Ramón de la Fuente (born 1970), Spanish footballer
- José Ramón de la Morena (born 1956), Spanish journalist
- Jose Ramon de la Torre (1935–2022), Puerto Rican academic
- José Ramón Díaz Alejandro (born 1943), Cuban artist
- José Ramón Díaz (born 1973), Puerto Rican politician
- José Ramón Eizmendi (born 1960), Spanish footballer and manager
- José Ramón Esnaola (born 1946), Spanish footballer
- José Ramón Fernández (journalist) (born 1946), Mexican journalist
- José Ramón Fernández (1923-2019), Cuban politician
- José Ramón Flórez, Spanish songwriter
- José Ramón Gallego (born 1959), Spanish footballer
- José Ramón García Antón (1948-2009), Spanish politician
- Jose Ramon Gonzalez Delgado (born 1953), Cuban artist
- José Ramón González, Puerto Rican businessman
- José Ramón Guizado (1899-1964), Panamanian politician
- José Ramón Gurruchaga Ezama (1931-2017), Spanish bishop
- José Ramón Herrero Merediz (1931-2016), Spanish politician
- José Ramón Hinojosa Montalvo (born 1947), Spanish historian
- José Ramón Larraz (1929-2013), Spanish director
- José Ramón López (born 1950), Spanish canoeist
- José Ramón Machado Ventura (born 1930), Cuban politician
- José Ramón Martel López (born 1955), Mexican politician
- José Ramón Medina (1919-2010), Venezuelan politician and poet
- José Ramón Muro (born 1954), Spanish painter
- José Ramón Oyarzábal (born 1957), Spanish rower
- José Ramón Patterson (born 1958), Spanish journalist
- José Ramón Rivero, Venezuelan politician
- José Ramón Rodil, 1st Marquess of Rodil (1789-1853), Spanish general
- José Ramón Romo (born 1963), Spanish footballer
- José Ramón Sandoval (born 1968), Spanish footballer and manager
- José Ramón Sauto (1912-1994), Mexican footballer
- José Ramón Uriarte (born 1967), Spanish cyclist
- Jose Ramon Villarin (born 1960), Filipino priest

See also:

- Ciudad Deportiva José Ramón Cisneros Palacios, football stadium in Spain
- Estadio Jose Ramon Flores, football stadium in El Salvador
- José Ramón Cepero Stadium, football stadium in Cuba
