= Whisperer =

A whisperer is someone who whispers.

Whisperer or Whisperers may also refer to:

== Literature ==
- The Whisperers: Private Life in Stalin's Russia, a 2007 book by Orlando Figes
- The Whisperer (novel), a 2009 fantasy novel by Australian author Fiona McIntosh

== Music ==
- "Whisperers", a song by Belgian singer Loïc Nottet for his debut studio album Selfocracy
- "The Whisperer" (song), a 2014 song by French DJ and producer David Guetta

== Other uses ==
- The Whisperer (radio program), 1951 American radio program
- The Whisperers, 1967 British drama film
- The Whisperers, a group of characters introduced in 2015 in the American comic book series The Walking Dead

== See also ==
- Ghost whisperer (disambiguation)
- The Horse Whisperer (disambiguation)
- Darrell Blocker, American intelligence officer nicknamed "The Spy Whisperer"
- The Whispers, an American vocal group
