= Jose Delgado =

Jose Delgado may refer to:

- José Antonio Delgado (1965–2006), Venezuelan mountaineer
- José Augusto Delgado (1938–2021), Brazilian judge
- Jose Delgado (politician), Filipino governor of Cebu during World War II
- José Delgado Saldaña (born 1977), Mexican professional wrestler
- José Dimas Cedeño Delgado (born 1933), Panamanian Roman Catholic archbishop
- Jose de Espronceda y Delgado (1808–1842), Spanish poet
- José Manuel Mota Delgado (born 1957), Portuguese footballer
- José Manuel Rodríguez Delgado (1915–2011), Spanish professor of neurophysiology
- José María Delgado (1887–1978), Philippine Ambassador to the Vatican
- José Matías Delgado (1767–1832), Salvadoran priest and politician
- José Miguel Arroyo Delgado (born 1969), Spanish bullfighter
- Jose Ramon Gonzalez Delgado (born 1953), Cuban artist
- José Ramos Delgado (1935–2010), Argentine footballer and manager
- José Raúl Delgado (born 1960), Cuban baseball player
- Juan José Martín Delgado (born 1949), Spanish football manager
- Gangbuster (DC Comics), fictional superhero
- José Delgado (journalist) (born 1966), Ecuadorian journalist
