= Cop this Lot =

Australian comic novel

Cop This Lot
- Author: John O'Grady, "Nino Culotta"
- Language: English
- Genre: Comic novel
- Publisher: Ure Smith, Sydney
- Publication date: 1960
- Publication place: Australia
- Pages: 220 pp
- Preceded by: They're a Weird Mob
- Followed by: Gone Fishin'

Cop this Lot (1960) is a popular Australian comic novel written by John O'Grady under the pen name "Nino Culotta", the name of the main character of the book. It is a sequel to the even more popular They're a Weird Mob.

== Plot ==
Giovanni 'Nino' Culotta is an Italian immigrant, who came to Australia as a journalist, but became a brickie's labourer. Now, several years later, he is a builder, and married to Kay, with a daughter Maria and son Nino junior.

Nino decides to travel back to Italy to see his parents, and takes not only Kay, but his mates Joe and Dennis, who have never left Sydney. They travel by aeroplane and cargo ship and buy a cheap car in Germany to drive to Italy.

They arrive at the Cullota family villa, and Nino's father, a crusty patriarch, is only concerned that Nino and Kay have not been 'properly' married by an Italian priest.

By the time they return to Sydney, Joe and Dennis, despite their working-class 'Ocker' background, have acquired a veneer of European sophistication, preferring wine to beer and unwilling even to get drunk.

== Sequels ==
The book has two sequels, Gone Fishin' , and Gone Gougin' which feature largely the same cast of characters.

Gone Gougin' takes place in 1975, 10 years after Gone Fishin' , in which Nino's two children (Young Nino and Maria) are now adults.

The novel Gone Fishin' is the only novel not to feature the main characters from the first two books, Joe, Edie and Dennis as primary characters. They appear onwards from chapter 11, and Dennis gets engaged.

In the following book, Gone Gougin' , only Nino, Joe and Dennis (now married) appear, and their wives are only briefly mentioned.

== See also ==
- 1960 in Australian literature
