= The Irishman (disambiguation) =

The Irishman is a 2019 American epic crime film directed by Martin Scorsese.

The Irishman may also refer to:

- The Irishman (1978 film), an Australian romantic drama, based on the novel
- The Irishman (novel), by Elizabeth O'Conner, 1960
- Frank Sheeran, nicknamed "The Irishman", an American labor union leader, subject of the 2019 film

== See also ==
- I Heard You Paint Houses, a 2004 work of narrative nonfiction about Frank "The Irishman" Sheeran
- Irish people, people from Ireland
