= Bridge of Souls =

The Bridge of Souls or Bridge of Souls may refer to:

== Religion ==
- Chinvat Bridge, a metaphysical term in Zoroastrianism

== Literature ==
- Bridge of Souls (book), a 2004 novel by Fiona McIntosh
