= They're a Weird Mob (film) =

- DVD cover
- Directed by: Michael Powell
- Written by: Richard Imrie
- Based on: They're a Weird Mob by John O'Grady
- Produced by: Michael Powell
- Starring: Walter Chiari; Chips Rafferty; Claire Dunne
- Cinematography: Arthur Grant
- Edited by: Gerald Turney-Smith
- Music by: Score: Alan Boustead; Lawrence Leonard; Songs: Reen Devereaux; Walter Chiari; Mikis Theodorakis
- Production company: Williamson-Powell International Films
- Distributed by: British Empire Films
- Release dates: 18 August 1966 (Sydney, premiere); 13 October 1966 (Australia)
- Running time: 112 minutes
- Country: Australia
- Language: English
- Budget: A$600,000 (est.) or £234,925
- Box office: A$2,417,000 (Australia)

They're a Weird Mob is a 1966 Australian comedy film directed by Michael Powell and starring Walter Chiari, Chips Rafferty and Claire Dunne. It was written by Richard Imrie (a pseudonym for Emeric Pressburger) based on the 1957 novel of the same title by John O'Grady under the pen name "Nino Culotta", the name of the main character of the book. It was the penultimate collaboration of British filmmakers Powell and Pressburger.

== Plot ==
Nino Culotta is an Italian immigrant, newly arrived in Australia. He expected to work for his cousin as a sports writer for an Italian language magazine. However, on arrival in Sydney, Nino discovers that the cousin has abandoned the magazine, leaving a substantial debt to Kay Kelly. Nino declares that he will get a job and pay back the debt.

Working as a labourer Nino becomes mates with his co-workers, despite some difficulties with Australian slang and culture of the 1960s. Nino endeavours to understand the aspirational values and social rituals of everyday urban Australians, and assimilate. A romantic attraction builds between Nino and Kay despite her frosty exterior and her conservative Irish father's dislike of Italians.

A tone of mild racism exists in the film between Anglo-Celtic and Anglo-Celtic Australian characters such as Kay Kelly's dad Harry and Nino. Harry says he does not like writers, brickies or dagos. Nino is all three. But this is undermined when Nino, sitting in the Kelly house notices a picture of the pope on the wall. Nino says "If I am a dago, then so is he". Realising the impossibility of referring to the pope by that derogatory term, Harry gives in.

== Cast ==
- Walter Chiari as Giovanni 'Nino' Culotta
- Claire Dunne as Kay Kelly
- Chips Rafferty as Harry Kelly
- Alida Chelli as Giuliana
- Ed Devereaux as Joe Kennedy
- Slim DeGrey as Pat
- John Meillon as Dennis
- Charles Little as Jimmy
- Anne Haddy as barmaid
- Jack Allen as fat man in bar
- Red Moore as texture man
- Ray Hartley as newsboy
- Tony Bonner as lifesaver
- Alan Lander as Charlie
- Keith Peterson as drunk man on ferry
- Muriel Steinbeck as Mrs Kelly
- Gloria Dawn as Mrs Chapman
- Jeanie Drynan as Betty
- Gita Rivera as Maria
- Judith Arthy as Dixie
- Doreen Warburton as Edie
- Barry Creyton as hotel clerk
- Graham Kennedy as himself (cameo)
- Robert McDarra as hotel manager
- Judi Farr as hotel telephonist (uncredited)
- Noel Brophy as irate ferry passenger
- Jacki Weaver as girl on beach
- Liza Goddard as girl on ferry (uncredited)
- Ken James as bellboy at King's Cross hotel (uncredited)
- John Hargreaves as youth at train station (uncredited)
- Ron Shand as man at racetrack (uncredited)
- Gordon Glenwright
- Tom Oliver as barbecue chef's friend

Cast notes

- John O'Grady, the author of the novel, makes a cameo appearance as the grey-bearded drinker in the pub in the opening sequence of the film.
- Alida Chelli was the girlfriend of Walter Chiari, but almost did not get the part because she was thought to be too glamorous and might have upstaged Claire Dunne.

== Production ==
=== Development ===
They're a Weird Mob was optioned in 1959 by Gregory Peck with him to direct but not appear, but he could not come up with a workable screenplay. Michael Powell first read the novel in London in 1960 and wanted to turn it into a film but Peck had the rights. Powell obtained them three years later."

=== Finance ===
The film was one of a series of movies financed together by Rank and the NFFC. £166,925 of the budget came from the NFFC and Rank, the rest from the production company Williamson-Powell International Films.

=== Casting ===
Walter Chiari had previously visited Australia during the filming of On the Beach (1959), which starred his then-girlfriend Ava Gardner. Claire Dunne was working as a weather girl when cast in the female lead.

It was one of Muriel Steinbeck's last acting roles.

=== Shooting ===
The film started filming in October 1965 and was shot at a number of locations in the area of Sydney:

- Bondi Beach
- Circular Quay (where the ferry comes ashore)
- Clark Island (the beach party)
- Hunter Street and Elizabeth Street in the central business district
- Martin Place (where Graham Kennedy asks Nino for directions)
- Manly Beach
- Neutral Bay (final scene shot at 9 Wallaringa Ave, Neutral Bay)
- Qantas House (where Nino buys a copy of The Herald)
- "The House That Nino Built" is located at 128 Greenacre Road in Greenacre, a suburb of Sydney. The actors dug trenches, poured concrete, laid bricks and so on, and it was then finished professionally and sold to raise funds for The Royal Life Saving Society. The stars' footprints were set in concrete slabs in the pathway.
- Punchbowl railway station, where Nino is picked up by Joe prior to his first day at work has changed over the years. In a previous configuration it was possible to park a vehicle virtually at the bottom of the northern steps.
- Balgowlah Heights The place where Nino & Kay want to build their home is referred to in the "making of " documentary as Grotto Point. Balgowlah Heights is on Dobroyd Head on the north side of the entrance to Middle Harbour.

The film has been credited with the revival of the moribund Australian film industry, which led to the Australian "New Wave" films of the 1970s.

== Reception ==
=== Box office ===
They're a Weird Mob grossed $2,417,000 at the box office in Australia, equivalent to $35,700,000 in 2022. However it performed poorly outside Australia. The NFFC reported its overseas earnings on the film as £207,821. John McCallum said:

We never anticipated that the 'Mob' would do well outside Australia, and it didn't. In fact, it did below-average 'business in England, and apart from a few sales on the Continent it hasn't been sold anywhere else. Italy was a disappointment, particularly as we had Walter Chiari as the star. The trouble there was we couldn't translate Kings bloody Cross into Italian, or rather, when we did, there was no joke. Chiari tried hard, and we got other translators, but it just lost all meaning. We had intended to develop a TV series out of the film, but we realised that there was no future in it for export.

In 1968 John McCallum wrote that of the $2 million the film had then earned, only $400,000 had been returned to the film-makers. He later reflected, "It's our own fault; we were green and we signed a very bad distribution contract. We had an investment from Rank, who also distributed the film, and they bit very hard on the distribution. They took 35 percent, and that's far too high. Twenty-five's a fair thing. That extra ten percent was the killer. It's as simple as that."

=== Critical ===
The Monthly Film Bulletin wrote: "Behind the rugged exterior and grating speech of the average Australian, there lies a heart of gold: or so would seem to be the cosy message of this rather patronising tale of how an immigrant makes good in barbarous Sydney (by marrying the boss's daughter – how else?). Michael Powell seems ill-at-ease during the chummily extrovert opening, with its repeated assurances that Australia is a big, big country and its endless jokes about a foreigner's difficulties in understanding the slang; but after that the film stops trying so hard to be jolly, and the quieter sequences in which the Italian learns to live his new life are moderately effective. Nothing, though, can really conceal the fact that this is just a routine women's magazine romance in a new setting; and the acting is mostly indifferent."

Filmink called it "a beautiful little comedy full of heart... a huge hit in Australia but did not “travel” in Britain or Europe and lost money. This was bewildering – perhaps star Walter Chiari was not a draw, or the comedy did not translate, or British audiences simply didn’t care about Italians in Australia."

Leslie Halliwell wrote "Patchy comedy from a local bestseller"

== DVD ==
The film has been released on Region 4 DVD by Roadshow. The DVD includes a TV special, "The Story of Making the Film They're a Weird Mob" as well as a picture gallery, theatrical trailer and optional subtitles.

The film has been released on Region 2 DVD by Opening in the Les films de ma vie series. The DVD has fixed French subtitles for the original English soundtrack.

== The Story of the Making of 'They're a Weird Mob' ==
A behind-the-scenes 60-minute documentary was shot called The Story of the Making of 'They're a Weird Mob'. It aired in Sydney on 12 August 1966 and in Melbourne on 22 August 1966.

== See also ==
- Cinema of Australia
- Italian Australians

== Notes ==
- Petrie, Duncan James (2016). "Resisting Hollywood Dominance in Sixties British Cinema: The NFFC/Rank Joint Financing Initiative" (PDF). Historical Journal of Film, Radio and Television.
