= Percheron (series) =

2005–7 fantasy trilogy by Fiona McIntosh

- First edition covers.
- Odalisque; Emissary; Goddess
- Author: Fiona McIntosh
- Cover artist: Greg Bridges
- Country: Australia
- Language: English
- Genre: Fantasy
- Publisher: Voyager
- Published: 2005–2007
- Media type: Print (trade paperback and paperback)

Percheron is a fantasy trilogy first released in 2005 by Australian fantasy author Fiona McIntosh. The story takes place in the exotic Percheron where the gods are once again arising to do battle for the future. Thrust into the centre of this epic battle is Lazar, and his beloved Ana.

== Works in the series ==
=== Odalisque (2005) ===
After the old Zar dies, 15-year-old Boaz takes power. His mother Herezah arranges for her son's rivals to be disposed of and oversees the assembly of a new harem. One of its number is Ana whose only friends are Lazar, the Spur of Percheron, and a dwarf called Pez. Ana tries to escape, resulting in Lazar's apparent death at the hands of Salmeo, the eunuch in charge of the harem. Meanwhile, the rising of Iridor heralds a new cycle in the war of faith between the demon Maliz and the goddess Lyana.

=== Emissary (2006) ===
Ana is resigned to life in Percheron's harem and has only a veil to know the man she loves, Spur Lazar, is dead. Meanwhile, she is being watched by Eunuch Salmeo and Valide Herezah, with Valide scheming her demise. The Demon Maliz has taken the identity of the Grand Vizier in order to stalk Iridor, the Goddess' accomplice and a war is starting with an enemy seeking a price for the death of their crown prince.

=== Goddess (2007) ===
In Percheron, Zar is preparing for the arrival of the Galinsean war fleet. Lazar meanwhile is determined to travel back to the desert instead of taking part in delicate negotiations, where Ana is being held prisoner by fanatics.
