= 1958 in poetry =

Nationality words link to articles with information on the nation's poetry or literature (for instance, Irish or France).

== Events ==
- April 18 — American poet Ezra Pound's indictment for treason is dismissed. He is released from St. Elizabeths Hospital, an insane asylum in Maryland, after spending 12 years there (starting in 1946) and returns to Italy.
- June 29 — A monument to Vladimir Mayakovsky is unveiled in the centre of Moscow and becomes a focus for informal poetry readings.
- Brazilian manifesto for concrete poetry, which focuses on visual and other sensory qualities.
- Writers Workshop, a Calcutta, India-based literary publisher, is founded this year by the poet P. Lal with several other writers.

== Works published in English ==
Listed by nation where the work was first published and again by the poet's native land, if different; substantially revised works listed separately:

- Donald Hall et al., editors, New Poets of England and America
- David Cecil and Allen Tate, Modern Verse in English (anthology)

=== Australia ===
- Geoffrey Dutton, Antipodes in Shoes
- R. D. Fitzgerald, "The Wind at Your Door"
- Francis Webb, "Five Days Old"

=== Canada ===
- Earle Birney, Selected Poems
- Louis Dudek:
  - Laughing Stalks
  - En Mexico
- John Glassco, The Deficit Made Flesh
- Ralph Gustafson, The Penguin Book of Canadian Verse
- Irving Layton, A Laughter in the Mind.
- E. J. Pratt, The Collected Poems of E. J. Pratt. Toronto: Macmillan. (introduction by Northrop Frye)
- James Reaney, A Suit of Nettles. Governor General's Award 1958.
- F. R. Scott and A.J.M. Smith, The Blasted Pine, a satirical miscellany
- A. J. M. Smith and F. R. Scott, editors, The Oxford Book of Canadian Verse (see also the edition of 1966)
- Raymond Souster, Crepe-Hanger's Carnival: Selected Poems 1955-58 Toronto: Contact Press.
- Miriam Waddington, The Season's Lovers

==== Criticism, scholarship and biography in Canada ====
- L.M. Lande, Old Lamps Aglow
- R.E. Rashley, Poetry in Canada

=== Ireland ===
- Thomas Kinsella, Another September, Dublin, Dolmen Press
- Patrick MacDonogh, One Landscape Still
- Donagh MacDonagh and Lennox Robinson editors, The Oxford Book of Irish Verse, XVIIth century-XXth century (anthology)

=== India, in English ===
- Sarojini Naidu, The Sceptred Flute—Songs of India ( Poetry in English ), Allahabad: Kitabistan, published posthumously (died 1949)
- Dilip Kumar Roy, The Immortals of the Bhagvat ( Poetry in English ),

=== United Kingdom ===
- A. Alvarez, The End of It
- John Betjeman, Collected Poems, London: John Murray; Boston, Houghton Mifflin, 1959
- Michael Hamburger, The Dual Site, London: Routledge and Kegan Paul
- John Heath-Stubbs, Helen in Egypt, and Other Plays
- Elizabeth Jennings, A Sense of the World
- George Rostrevor Hamilton, Collected Poems
- John Heath-Stubbs, The Triumph of the Muse
- Elizabeth Jennings, A Sense of the World, London: André Deutsch
- Thomas Kinsella, Another September Irish poet published in the United Kingdom
- Dom Moraes, A Beginning, his first book of poems (winner of the Hawthornden Prize), Indian at this time living in the United Kingdom
- James Reeves, The Talking Skull
- Michael Roberts, Collected Poems
- Alan Ross, To Whom It May Concern
- John Silkin, The Two Freedoms
- Sir Osbert Sitwell, On the Continent (see also England Reclaimed 1927 and Wrack at Tidesend 1952)
- John Smith, Excursus in Autumn, including "Two Men Meet, Each Believing the Other to be of a Higher Rank"
- A.S.J. Tessimond, Selection
- R.S. Thomas, Poetry for Supper
- C.A. Trypanis, a book of poetry
- David Wright, Monologue of a Deaf Man, London: André Deutsch
- Andrew Young, Out of the World and Back: into Hades, & A Travller in Time: two poems

=== United States ===
- Conrad Aiken, Sheepfold Hill
- Djuna Barnes, The Antiphon a surrealist verse play
- John Berryman, His Thoughts Made Pockets & the Plane Buckt
- John Ciardi, I marry You; a Sheaf of Love Poems
- Gregory Corso:
  - Gasoline
  - Bomb
- Louis Coxe, The Wilderness and Other Poems
- E.E. Cummings, 95 Poems
- Lawrence Ferlinghetti, A Coney Island of the Mind, New Directions
- George Garrett, The Sleeping Gypsy
- Donald Hall, The Dark Houses
- Anthony Hecht, The Seven Deadly Sins
- John Hollander, A Crackling of Thorns, Yale University Press
- Rolfe Humphries, editor, New Poems by American Poets (anthology)
- Stanley Kunitz, Selected Poems: 1928–1958
- Denise Levertov, Overland to the Islands, Highlands, North Carolina: Jonathan Williams
- Archibald MacLeish, J.B., a verse play
- William Meredith, The Open Sea and Other Poems
- Howard Nemerov, Mirrors and Windows
- Kenneth Patchen:
  - Poem-scapes
  - Hurrah for Anything
  - When We Were Here Together
- Theodore Roethke, Words for the Wind, Garden City, New York: Doubleday
- Muriel Rukeyser, Body of Waking
- Winfield Townley Scott, The Dark Sister
- Karl Shapiro, Poems of a Jew, New York: Random House
- Eli Siegel, Hot Afternoons Have Been in Montana: Poems nominated for the Pulitzer Prize for Poetry.
- Clark Ashton Smith, Spells and Philtres
- William Jay Smith, Poems 1947-1957
- May Swenson, A Cage of Spines
- Charles Tomlinson, Seeing Is Believing, New York: McDowell, Obolensky
- John Updike, The Carpentered Hen and Other Tame Creatures
- Mona Van Duyn, Valentines to the Wide World
- David Wagoner, A Place to Stand
- William Carlos Williams, Paterson, Book V

=== Other in English ===
- James K. Baxter, In Fires of No Return, published by Oxford University Press, giving Baxter international recognition, New Zealand
- Peter Bland, Three Poets, New Zealand

== Works published in other languages ==
Listed by language and often by nation where the work was first published and again by the poet's native land, if different; substantially revised works listed separately:

=== Spanish language ===
==== Chile ====
- Efraín Barqueto, La Compañera
- Alfonso Calderón, El Pais Jubiloso ("Jubilant Country")
- Vincente Huidobro, Ataigle, French translation
- Gabriela Mistral, Poesías completas, Madrid : Aguilar
- Pablo Neruda, Complete Works

==== Others from Latin America ====
- José Ramón, Antología poética, Argentina
- Rubén Vela, Veranos, Argentina

==== Spain ====
- Jorge Guillén:
  - Viviendo
  - Maremágnum
- Miguel de Unamuno, Cincuenta poesías inéditas (written 1899–1927, now published for the first time)

=== Portuguese language ===
==== Portugal ====
- Herberto Hélder, O Amor em Visita
- Eugénio de Andrade, Coração do dia
- Alexandre O'Neill, No Reino da Dinamarca
- Mário Cesariny, Alguns Mitos Maiores e Alguns Mitos Menores Postos à Circulação pelo Autor

=== French language ===
==== French Canada ====
- Ollivier Mercier-Gouin, Poèmes et Chansons
- Ronald Després, Silences à nourrir de sang
- Roger Brien, Vols et plongées
- Alain Grandbois, L'Étoile pourpre
- Roland Giguère, Le défaut des ruines est d'avoir des habitants

==== France ====
- Yves Bonnefoy, Hier régnant désert
- Pierre Emmanuel, Versant de l'âge
- Vincente Huidobro, Altaigle (translation from Spanish)
- Philippe Jaccottet, L'Ignorant
- Pierre Jean Jouve, Inventions
- Raymond Queneau:
  - Le chien à la mandoline
  - Cent mille milliards de poèmes
- Roger-Arnould Rivière, Déserts
- Georges Schéhadé, Ethiopiques

=== Hebrew ===
- Sh. Shalom:
  - Ben Tehelet ve-Lavan ("Amidst the Blue and White")
  - Shirai Kommiut Israel ("Poems on the Rise of Israel")
- Yehoshua Rabinow, Shirat Amitai ("Amitai's Song")
- I. Shalev, Eloha Hanoshek Lohamim
- P. Elad, Mizrah Shemesh ("East of the Sun")
- David Rokeah, Kearar Aleh Shaham ("Juniper on Granite")
- T. Carmi, ha-Yam ha-Aharon ("The Last Sea")
- Y. Amihai, be-Merhak Shtai Tikvot ("At a Distance of Two Hopes")
- Ephraim Lisitzky, Anshai Midot ("Virtuous Men")

=== India ===
Listed in alphabetical order by first name:

- Buddhidhari Singha, Madhumati, Maithili
- Nalini Bala Devi, Yuga-devata, Indian, Assamese-language
- Gopal Prasad Rimal, Yo Prem! ("This Love"), Nepali
- K. S. Narasimha Swami, Silalate, Kannada

=== Other ===
- Dritëro Agolli, Në rrugë dolla ("I went out on the street") (Albania)
- Ko Un, Hyondae Munhak (South Korea)
- Meyer Stiker, Yidishe landshaft ("Yiddish Landscape"), his second book of poems (Yiddish)
- Luo Fu, River of the Soul Chinese (Taiwan)

== Awards and honors ==
=== Australia ===
- Grace Leven Prize for Poetry: Geoffrey Dutton, Antipodes in Shoes

=== United Kingdom ===
- Queen's Gold Medal for Poetry: Francis Cornford
- Foyle Prize for Poetry: Dame Edith Sitwell, Collected Poems
- Guinness Poetry Awards:
  - Ted Hughes, The Thought Fox
  - Thomas Kinsella, Thinking of Mr. D
  - David Wright, A Thanksgiving

=== United States ===
- Consultant in Poetry to the Library of Congress (later the post would be called "Poet Laureate Consultant in Poetry to the Library of Congress"): Robert Frost appointed this year.
- National Book Award for Poetry: Robert Penn Warren, Promises: Poems, 1954-1956
- Pulitzer Prize for Poetry: Stanley Kunitz, Selected Poems 1928-1958
- Bollingen Prize: E.E. Cummings
- Fellowship of the Academy of American Poets: Robinson Jeffers
- Harper's Eugene F. Saxton Fellowship; Conrad Hilberry
- Huntington Hartford Foundation Award: Robert Frost
- Jewish Book Council's Harry Kovner Memorial poetry awards: I.J. Schwartz for contributions to Yiddish poetry; Aaron Zeitlin for Bein Ha-Esh Yeha-Yesha
- Yale Series of Younger Poets award: William Dickey for Of the Festivity

==== American Academy of Arts and Letters ====
- American Academy of Arts and Letters Gold Medal in Poetry: Conrad Aiken
- Marjorie Peabody Waite Award: Dorothy Parker

==== Poetry Magazine ====
- Levinson prize: Stanley Kunitz
- Oscar Blumenthal prize: Siydney Goodsir Smith
- Eunice Tiejens prize: Mona Van Duyn
- Bess Hokin prize: Charles Tomlinson
- Union League Civic and Arts Foundation prize: Jean Garrigue
- Vachel Lindsay prize : Hayden Carruth
- Harriet Monroe Poetry Prize: Stanley Kunitz

==== Poetry Society of America ====
- Shelley Memorial Award: Kenneth Rexroth
- Alexander Droutzkoy Memorial gold medal: Robert Frost
- Walt Whitman Award: James E. Miller, Jr.
- Reynolds Lyric Award: John Fandel
- William Rose Benet Memorial Award: Robert A. Wallace
- Edna St. Vincent Millay Award: Robert Penn Warren
- Poetry Chap-Book Award: Arthur Waley
- Emily S. Hamblen Memorial award: Sir Geoffrey Keynes for The Complete Writings of William Blake
- Arthur Davison Ficke Memorial award: Ulrich Trobetzkoy
- Laura Speyer Memorial award: Mary A. Winter
- Borestone Mountain Poetry Award: John Hall Wheelock, Poems Old and New

=== France ===
- Grand Prix Littéraire de la Ville de Paris: Maurice Fonbeure for poetry
- Grand Prix de Poésie de l'Académie française: Mme. Gérard d'Houville

=== Other ===
- Mondadori, Viareggio poetry prize (Italy): S. Quasimodo, La terra impareggiabile
- Canada: Governor General's Award, poetry or drama: A Suit of Nettles, James Reaney

== Births ==
Death years link to the corresponding "[year] in poetry" article:

- January 5 – Harold Rhenisch, Canadian poet
- April 15:
  - Anne Michaels, Canadian poet and novelist
  - Benjamin Zephaniah (died 2023), British dub poet
- August 29 – Michael Jackson (died 2009), American pop singer, songwriter, poet and author
- November 27 – Andrew Waterhouse (suicide 2001), English poet and environmentalist
- Also:
  - Jill Battson, Canadian poet
  - Lionel Fogarty (died 2026), Australian poet and political activist
  - James Lasdun, English poet and fiction writer
  - Subodh Sarkar, Bengali poet, writer, editor and academic in India
  - Margaret Smith, American poet, musician and artist

== Deaths ==
Birth years link to the corresponding "[year] in poetry" article:

- January 3 – Gerald William Bullett, 64, English author and critic
- January 15 – Brian Howard, 52 (born 1905), English poet and writer, suicide
- March 13 – Vallathol Narayana Menon (born 1878), Indian, Malayalam language poet
- March 24 – Seumas O'Sullivan (born 1879), Irish
- May 5 – James Branch Cabell, 79, whose 52 books included poetry, of a cerebral hemorrhage (to help people remember the pronunciation of his name, he composed the ditty, "Tell the rabble my name is CA-bell.")
- June 10 – Angelina Weld Grimke (born 1880), African American lesbian journalist and poet
- June 25 or 28 – Alfred Noyes, 77 (born 1880), English poet
- September 8 – Geoffrey Winthrop Young, 81 (born 1876), English mountaineer, poet and educator
- September 11 – Robert W. Service, 84 (born 1874), Scots-Canadian poet who wrote The Cremation of Sam McGee
- October 29 – Zoë Akins, 72, American poet and dramatist who won the 1935 Pulitzer Prize for her drama version of Edith Wharton's The Old Maid
- November 12 – Masamune Atsuo 正宗敦夫 (born 1881), Japanese poet and academic
- December 20 – Sir John Collings Squire, British poet, writer, historian and influential literary editor
- Also:
  - Emil Barth (born 1900), German
  - Francis Carco, French poet and novelist
  - Yves Gérard le Dantec, French

== See also ==
- Poetry
- List of poetry awards
- List of years in poetry
