= The Quickening (series) =

Novel trilogy by Fiona McIntosh

- First edition covers.
- Myrren's Gift; Blood and Memory; Bridge of Souls
- Author: Fiona McIntosh
- Illustrator: Bettina Guthridge (map)
- Cover artist: Les Peterson (main); Mike Golding (border)
- Country: Australia
- Language: English
- Genre: Fantasy novel
- Publisher: Voyager Books
- Published: 2003–2004
- Media type: Print (Paperback)

The Quickening is a fantasy trilogy of novels released first released in 2003 by Fiona McIntosh. The story centres on various realms, legions, heroes, knights, and sorcerers, while intermingling love and romance within battles between good and evil.

== Overview ==
At first the story is that of a general of a legion at war with a neighbouring realm. As the story unwraps the reader learns of the frightening, emotional, and yet all too exciting life of Wyl Thirsk. Throughout the series a twist of magical elements is introduced and guides the life of the main character.

=== Charts and Maps ===
- Wyl Thirsk's Transformations: The Quickening trilogy gets its name from a curse that is bestowed on the main character. Myrren, the last living witch, possesses a power that she gives to Wyl as he witnesses her death. As Wyl is the only person kind to her, she tells him that she will give him a "gift" that will avenge her and grant him power. This power is said to prevent Wyl from dying, while instead causing him to take on the body of his murderers until he has become who he was destined to be.
- Inside of every book cover there is an overview map of the kingdoms.

=== Theme/Analysis ===
Many times during the novels the reader can interpret a situation or conversation as having more than a surface meaning. In her own words, McIntosh's style is summed up thus:

"My leading characters are usually thrown into torrid circumstances, needing to live by their wits, and I need them making very human errors of judgment now and then. It steps up the tension and gives the reader good reason to go back for more to find out how these characters, that they're now helplessly involved with, solve their dilemmas. By making my characters experience lots of emotions, lots of hurdles, forcing them to essentially dig themselves out of horrendous situations by their own cunning and intelligence, it stops them being fantastical characters of magic and allows the reader to relate very strongly with them. Magic is increasingly my backdrop to a story rather than having individual characters wielding it too much or too often."

== Works in the series ==
=== Myrren's Gift (2003) ===
All Wyl Thirsk ever wanted was for his family to be happy, to be loyal to his monarch, King Magnus, as his father was and, most importantly, to follow in the footsteps of his father, Fergys Thirsk. But change is in the wind after Magnus married a foreign woman who gave him a cruel but handsome son - Prince Celimus.

=== Blood and Memory (2004) ===
The unfamiliar faces of Wyl.

=== Bridge of Souls (2004) ===
The final chapter of his journey.

== Characters ==
- Fergys Thirsk – The General. The story begins with his death. A good friend of the king.
- King Magnus – The king of Morgravia.
- Wyl Thirsk – The main character, a rough red-headed teenage youth born as the general of the Morgravian army and legion, grows into a highly respected figurehead.
- Ylena Thirsk – Wyl's sister. Daughter of a noble family, a strong-willed girl who enjoys the simple things in life and has a pure voice.
- Alyd Donal – The youngest son of a noble and loyal family to the crown. Newly wed to Ylena.
- Gueryn le Gant – The Thirsk family body guard and close friend.
- King Celimus – The new king, a wicked hot-headed murderer.
- Fynch – A strange and unusually strong young boy who works in the castle.
- Valentyna – The heir and queen of Briavel. An exotic beauty and young leader.
- Elspyth of Yentro – A teenage girl born into a family of sorcerers.
- Myrren – A convicted witch, she is burned at the stake in the town as an example.
- Lothryn – Cailech's right-hand man and best friend.
- King Cailech – The rugged mountain king.
