= Claire Dunne (disambiguation) =

Claire Dunne (born 1937) is an Irish-born Australian actress, author, lecturer and broadcaster.

Claire Dunne or Claire Dunn may refer to:

- Clare Dunne (Irish actress) (born 1988)
- Clare Dunn (born 1987), American country musician
