= Blood Memory =

Blood Memory may refer to:

- the autobiography of dancer Martha Graham, published in 1991
- a limited series by the podcast Love and Radio, profiling former Aryan Brotherhood leader Michael Thompson, published in 2026
- Blood Memory (novel), a novel by Greg Iles, published in 2005
- "Blood Memory" (Supergirl), an episode of Supergirl
- a series of photographs taken by the Yugoslavian-born photographer Lala Meredith-Vula in Kosova during 1991 and 1992
- an alternative term for a genetic memory

== See also ==
- Blood and Memory, a fantasy novel by Fiona McIntosh, published in 2004.
