= Odalisque (novel) =

2005 novel by Fiona McIntosh

- Odalisque first edition cover.
- Author: Fiona McIntosh
- Cover artist: Greg Bridges
- Language: English
- Series: Percheron
- Genre: Fantasy novel
- Publisher: HarperCollins
- Publication date: 26 October 2005
- Publication place: Australia
- Media type: Print (Trade paperback and paperback)
- Pages: 592 pp (first edition)
- ISBN: 0-7322-8180-6
- Followed by: Emissary

Odalisque is a 2005 fantasy novel by Fiona McIntosh and the first in the Percheron series.

== Plot summary ==
The story begins with a slave driver attempting to sell his latest finds, including a foreign captive known only as Lazar. Hot tempered and confident, Lazar invokes his right to a fight to the death that, if he wins, will grant him his freedom. Zar Joreb, Percheron's leader decides to attend the fight and is so impressed by the demonstrated fighting skills that he offers Lazar the elite position of Spur.

== Reception ==
Writing for The Sun-Herald newspaper, Genevieve Swart gave Odalisque a positive review, stating "the book races off to a good start, leaving us on tenterhooks awaiting the next page-turner", while also noting that McIntosh's "torture scenes might want to come with a warning, so horrifying are the descriptions of medieval-style brutality". Reviewing the novel for The Age newspaper, Cameron Woodhead described the series as "competent" and "fast-paced", but was critical of how accurately Islamic history was portrayed.

Odalisque was included in the 2006 Books Alive Great Read Guide. In September 2006, it was rated as the seventh most popular fantasy novel in Australia by Nielsen BookScan.
