= Green Grows the Vine =

1960 novel by Nancy Cato

- Author: Nancy Cato
- Language: English
- Genre: Fiction
- Publisher: Heinemann, London
- Publication date: 1960
- Publication place: Australia
- Media type: Print
- Pages: 192 pp
- Preceded by: Time, Flow Softly
- Followed by: But Still the Stream

Green Grows the Vine (1960) is a novel by Australian writer Nancy Cato.

== Story outline ==
The novel follows the story of three women - Mandy, Mitch and Maria - who travel from Adelaide to pick grapes in the fictional South Australian wine-growing district of Vindura. All are escaping disappointments - death and broken relationships - and the time spent in the country offers them all a chance of renewal.

== Critical reception ==
A short review in The Canberra Times described the novel as "Another pleasantly earthy though quite undistinguished love story."

== Notes ==
- First written as 'The Budding Leaf' (unpublished). Cato threw this first version into the Thames while she was in London, and later re-wrote it.

== See also ==
- 1960 in Australian literature
