= Louisa Anne Meredith =

British-Australian writer and illustrator

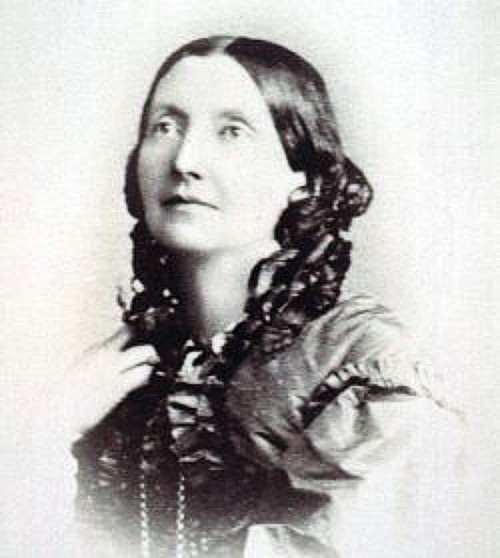
- Born: Louisa Anne Twamley; 20 July 1812; Birmingham, England
- Died: 21 October 1895 (aged 83); Collingwood, Victoria, Australia
- Resting place: Melbourne General Cemetery, Carlton North, Victoria
- Occupations: Writer, illustrator
- Spouse: Charles Meredith
- Writing career
- Notable works: "Tasmanian Friends & Foes - Feathered, Furred and Finned" (1880)

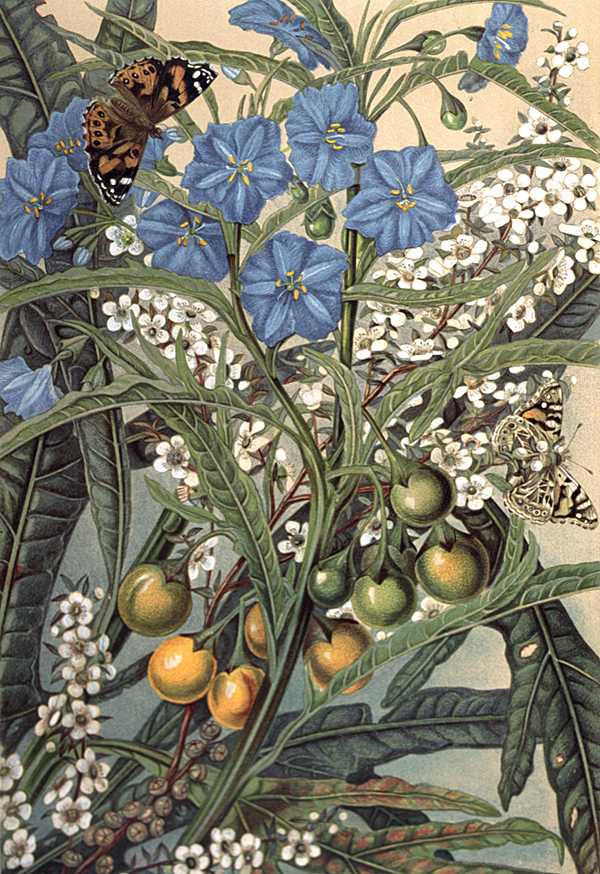

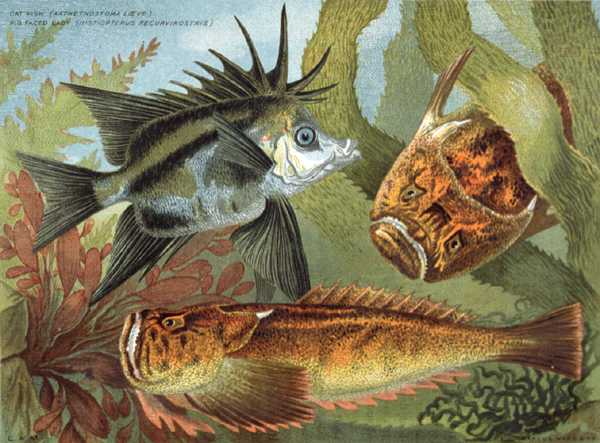

Louisa Anne Meredith (20 July 1812 – 21 October 1895), also known as Louisa Anne Twamley, was an Anglo-Australian writer, illustrator and possibly one of Australia's earliest photographers.

== Biography ==
Louisa Anne Twamley was born in Birmingham, England, the daughter of Thomas Twamley and Louisa Ann née Meredith.

On 18 April 1839, she married her cousin, Charles Meredith at Old Edgbaston Church, Birmingham. Charles had emigrated to Van Diemen's Land (now Tasmania) in 1821 with his father George and family. They had been pioneers of grazing, whaling and other activities around Swansea on Tasmania's East Coast. Charles had become a squatter in the Canberra district of New South Wales.

== Emigration to Australia ==
At the end of 1840 she relocated to Charles' father's property Cambria in Oyster Bay in Tasmania, where the couple's second son was born in 1844 at their newly built neighbouring property Spring Vale, in Great Swan Port. Severe economic depression in New South Wales caused their loss of 'all we owned in that colony.' Charles was appointed the Port Sorell police magistrate in 1844 by Lieutenant-Governor Eardley-Wilmot, after which the family, now with three sons, returned in 1848 to live on part of Charles' father's Cambria.

In 1891, Meredith worked to publish Last Series, Bush Friends in Tasmania. Published at the beginning of a severe financial depression in the Australian colonies, this project and the collapse of the bank where most of her savings were held ruined her financially. In her final years Meredith had chronic sciatica and became blind in one eye. She died in Collingwood, Victoria (a suburb of Melbourne) on 21 October 1895, and was buried at Melbourne General Cemetery in Carlton North, Victoria.

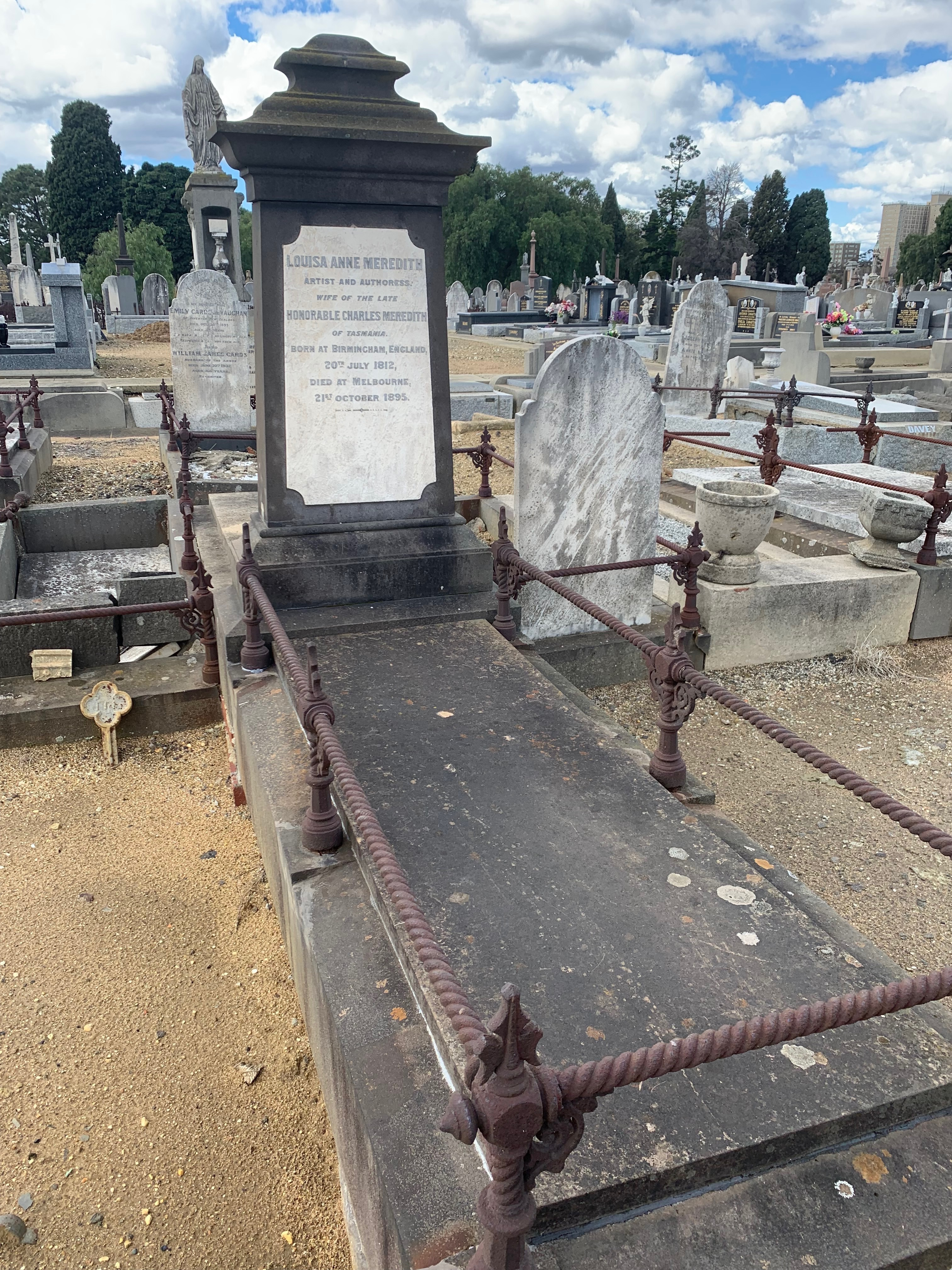
Louisa Anne Meredith's Gravestone at Melbourne General Cemetery

== Children's Literature ==
Meredith published a range of books for children in England, Australia, and abroad throughout her life. These works depict the landscape, flora and fauna of the West Midlands and Tasmania. Recent scholarship has renewed interest in these works as they have been overlooked by critics.

== Commentator and activist ==
Her husband Charles was a member of the Tasmanian Legislative Council for several terms between the mid-1850s until just before his death in 1881. She was an early member of the Society for the Prevention of Cruelty to Animals and influenced her husband to legislate for preservation of native wildlife and scenery.

== Photographer ==
Hall and Mather suggest that Meredith, nine years her senior, may have preceded Louisa Elizabeth How as the first woman photographer in Australia. Vivienne Rae-Ellis cites the subtitle of Meredith's 1861 Over the Straits; With Illustrations from Photographs, and the Author's Sketches., to note that photographs she made documenting her travels in Victoria in the 1850s were copied for the drawings, alongside her freehand sketches, reproduced for engravings that illustrate the book, as was usual in days before photomechanical reproduction.

Meredith recorded, in her 1839 diary, her attendance at a daguerreotype demonstration in Hobart and was certainly interested in the medium. She was a friend of Tasmanian John Watt Beattie in the 1880s and he records her giving him assistance as a photographer, and of her showing him the "many specimens of both her own and the Bishop Nixon's photographic work in those early days of the very black art," and that she had been "instrumental in having the last remnant of the Tasmanian Aboriginals photographed for the purposes of science." However, though there are records of her making them, not one of Meredith's photographs survives.
