= Tangara (novel) =

Book by Nan Chauncy

- Author: Nan Chauncy
- Language: English
- Genre: Children's fiction
- Publisher: Oxford University Press
- Publication date: 1960
- Publication place: Australia
- Media type: Print
- Pages: 180pp
- Preceded by: Devil's Hill
- Followed by: Half a World Away

Tangara (1960) is a novel for children by Australian author Nan Chauncy, illustrated by Brian Wildsmith. It won the Children's Book of the Year Award: Older Readers in 1961. It was published in America in 1962 under the title The Secret Friends.

== Plot outline ==
A young girl, Lexie, finds a necklace which belonged to her great-great Aunt Rita. This leads to a friendship with Merrina, and Lexie comes to learn of the treatment of Tasmanian Aboriginal people. The novel is part fantasy and part historical fiction.

== Critical reception ==
Katharine Scholes considers this one of the books that had a major impact upon her. "I first read this story about the friendship between two Tasmanian children - one white, one black - when I was 10 years old. My family had just moved from East Africa to Tasmania. The descriptions of the landscape and the magical feel to the story helped me see my new country as a place with imaginative and spiritual meaning. It made me feel more at home, which meant a lot to me at the time."

== See also ==
- 1960 in Australian literature
