= Devil's Hill (novel) =

Novel by Nan Chauncy

- Author: Nan Chauncy
- Language: English
- Genre: children's fiction
- Publisher: Oxford University Press
- Publication date: 1958
- Publication place: Australia
- Media type: Print
- Pages: 158pp
- Preceded by: Tiger in the Bush
- Followed by: Tangara

Devil's Hill (1958) is a novel for children by Australian author Nan Chauncy, illustrated by Geraldine Spence. It was joint winner of the Children's Book of the Year Award: Older Readers in 1959.

== Plot outline ==
This novel is a sequel to the author's previous novel Tiger in the Bush and is the second of two by the author concentrating on the Lorenny family, who live deep in the rainforest in south-western Tasmania.

The Lorenny family are hosts to their city cousins, Sam and his two younger sisters. The children set off through the bush in search of a lost cow and the novel tracks the conflicts between the city and country children and the gradual change of those from the city.

== Critical reception ==
In an overview of Chauncy's children's books dealing with the Australian bush, Susan Sheridan and Emma Maguire noted that in this novel: "...children and adults inhabit the same enchanted bush space, and the emphasis is on what can be achieved there, rather than on threats from the Outside in the form of scientists and loggers." And they concluded "...Chauncy’s treatment of the theme of entering into masculinity in the Badge Lorenny novels is subtly altered by her emphasis on learning from the bush through an attitude of attentive love. In retrospect, it is also possible to discern in her work the effects of an emerging, ecologically sensitive way of seeing human relationships to the environment."

== Screen adaptation ==
Devil's Hill was adapted as a television film for Tasmania's contribution to the Touch the Sun anthology series in 1988. The film was directed by Esben Storm.

== See also ==
- 1958 in Australian literature
