= They're a Weird Mob =

Australian comic novel

First edition (publ. Ure Smith)

They're a Weird Mob is a popular 1957 Australian comic novel written by John O'Grady under the pseudonym "Nino Culotta", the name of the main character of the book. The book was the first published novel by O'Grady, with an initial print run of 6,000 hardback copies. In less than six months, the book had been reprinted eight times and sold 74,000 copies. In the first year of publication, over 130,000 copies were sold. By the time of O'Grady's death in 1981, They're A Weird Mob was in its forty-seventh impression, with sales approaching the one million mark. Published by Ure Smith, the manuscript had been earlier rejected by publisher Angus & Robertson, and is reputedly the result of a ten pound bet between O'Grady and his brother, novelist Frank O'Grady.

== Plot ==
Giovanni 'Nino' Culotta is an Italian immigrant, who comes to Australia as a journalist, employed by an Italian publishing house, to write articles about Australians and their way of life for those Italians who might want to emigrate to Australia.

In order to learn about real Australians, Nino takes a job as a brickie's labourer with a man named Joe Kennedy. The comedy of the novel revolves around his attempts to understand English as it was spoken in Australia by the working classes in the 1950s and 1960s. Nino had previously only learned 'good' English from a textbook.

The novel is a social commentary on Australian society of the period; specifically male, working class society. Women mostly feature as cameos in the story with the exception of Kay (whose surname is not revealed in the novel), who becomes Nino's wife. In the novel, Nino meets Kay in a cafe in Manly and their introduction is effected by Nino trying to teach Kay that she cannot eat spaghetti using a spoon.

The final message of the novel is that immigrants to Australia should count themselves fortunate and should make efforts to assimilate into Australian society, including learning to speak Australian English. However, there is also a satirical undercurrent aimed at Australian society as a country of migrants.

== Sequels ==
The book has three sequels which feature largely the same cast of characters:

- Cop this Lot (1960) where Nino and his family travel to Italy to meet his parents
- Gone Fishin' (1962) where Nino, suffering from nervous exhaustion, leaves building for the life of a professional fisherman, fishing the Georges River
- Gone Gougin' :The weird mob in the opal fields (1975) in which Nino's two children (Young Nino and Maria) are now adults

The novel Gone Fishin' is the only novel not to feature the main characters from the first two books, Joe, Edie and Dennis, as primary characters. They finally appear onwards from chapter 11 (page 162), and Dennis finally gets engaged.

In the following book, Gone Gougin' , only Nino, Joe and Dennis (now married) appear, and their wives are only briefly mentioned.

== Media hype ==
The success of the novel projected Nino Culotta to initial fame and stardom; although O'Grady was writing under a pseudonym. There were initial requests for biographical information and author interviews, and even an invitation for Nino to appear at Melbourne's Moomba celebrations – all of which had to be rejected by O'Grady's publisher. Eventually, some two months after the novel's first release, it was strategically revealed that O'Grady was the author. Tiring of the fame that Culotta was generating, O'Grady turned down an offer from Sir Frank Packer to write a regular column in Weekend magazine, stating: "Culotta does not write again until he is ready ... I have no interest in Culotta any more" and is reputed to have delivered Culotta's eulogy in 1960 in a pub in Toongabbie in the western suburbs of Sydney.

== Adaptations ==
- The novel was adapted for the TV series Telestory in 1961–62 with actor Gordon Glenwright (who later had a role in the film) reading the book in 22 instalments. This was the second such production on Australian TV – Leonard Teale had read The Sundowners.
- The novel was optioned by the American actor Gregory Peck for his first possible directorial endeavor. Eventually the British producing team of Powell and Pressburger turned it into a 1966 film of the same name, starring Walter Chiari, Chips Rafferty, John Meillon and Claire Dunne.

== 1958 radio adaptation ==
In 1958 the novel was adapted for radio by Australasian Radio and TV productions by Gordon Grimsdale. The first release playing rights were sold to the Australian Broadcasting Commission (ABC) which was very rare at the time because the ABC did most of its productions inhouse. ART later adapted O'Grady's novel Cop This Lot as well.

=== Cast ===
- John Meillon as Nino (he later took the role of Dennis in the film version)
- Wendy Playfair as Kay
- Nigel Lovell as Dennis (he too appeared in an uncredited part in the film as the Building Inspector)
- John Bushelle as Joe
- Sheila Sewell as Edie
