= Louisa Elizabeth How =

Australian photographer (1821–1893)

Louisa Elizabeth How (1821–1893) was the first female photographer in Australia whose works survive.

== Biography ==
Louisa Elizabeth How was born in England in 1821 and married James How, a labourer from Malvern, Worcestershire. They and their two sons, William (b. 1844) and Edward (b. 1848?) arrived at Port Phillip aboard the Royal George on 28 November 1849 under the assisted passage scheme. In Melbourne James How was employed by Joseph Raleigh, a merchant and wharf owner and by 1857 was listed as one of the principal directors of How, Walker & Co., a merchant and shipping business started by a relative, Robert How. The family resided at 'Woodlands', next door to the present-day Admiralty House on Kirribilli Point, North Sydney.

== Early photographer ==
How, whose surviving output is found in one album made over only two years, was evidently an accomplished and enthusiastic artist whose photographic knowledge was derived, historians surmise, from any of several possible sources; perhaps from practitioners in England before migrating, from her reading, or from local contacts, or any combination of those.

Most likely she read the several extensive and instructive articles on the processes of photography that she herself used, in her copy of the English Art-Journal from vol.12, of 1850; in fact, it is presumed that the first photograph How made was of a Richard Austin Artlett engraving from the same volume, a portrait on page 297 of Emma Jane, Dowager Countess of Darnley after the unfinished painting by Sir Thomas Lawrence, now in the British Museum.

Robert Hunt on pages 38ff of the Art-Journal discusses the advantages of negatives on glass and decries the patent laws preventing development in England as rapid as that in France in photography; instructions and advice appear on p. 147 for those who "are at a distance from other sources of information” on the construction and use of a camera, and the selection of lenses; a report on M. Blanquart-Evrard’s ‘Improvements in Photography’ includes instructions for preparing and sensitising albumen paper for use ‘dry’ in the camera; an essay on page 261 “Photography: On Paper and on Glass” notes that “it is eleven years since Mr Fox Talbot’s” announcement of his photographic process and asserting that “the Talbotype at this moment remains the best and most practical of the photographic processes hitherto proposed” compared to the Daguerreotype’s “delicately constituted and easily destroyed image” on a “heavy and expensive metallic plate,” the essay going on to provide detailed instructions on evenly coating glass with albumen and sensitising with ‘iodide of silver’, in effect a ‘Talbotype’ on glass and its transformation, with added silver in development, into a positive image.

Louisa How may before her migration have been taught the medium at professional studios in England, but more likely she learned from William Hetzer to make salted paper prints from half-plate glass negatives for which the Sydney merchant was known, and for which he was the supplier of materials and the printer of his clients' negatives, including those of E.W. Ward and Robert Hunt.

There are plausible claims that it was Hetzer's wife Thekla who, from 1850 assisted him at his studio at 15 Hunter Street, who was the first woman photographer in Australia, but no works known to be hers have survived. Hall and Mather suggest that Louisa Anne Meredith, nine years her senior, may have preceded How in making photographs which appear, copied as drawings, in her 1861 book Over the Straits documenting her travels in Victoria in the 1850s.

== Photographic album ==
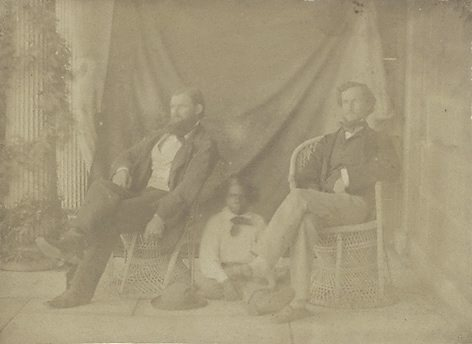
Louisa Elizabeth How (1858—1859) Mr William Landsborough, Tiger and J.L. salted paper print

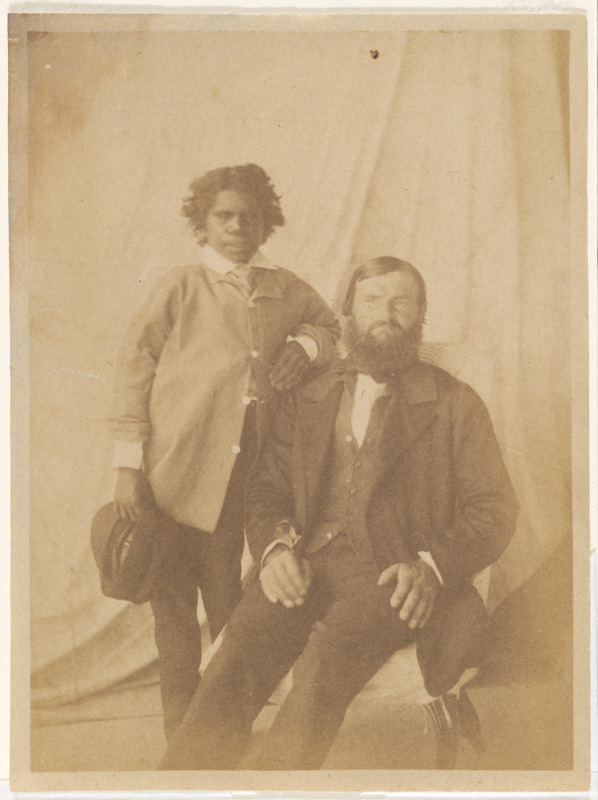
Louisa E. How (1858) William Landsborough and his native guide Tiger, calotype

In the same month of 1858 that the earliest exclusively photographic exhibition was held in Australia was mounted at the Sydney Philosophical Society, How made portraits of her guests on Christmas Day and Boxing Day at Woodlands. She set up a makeshift studio on her verandah, using furniture, drapes and props including a stereoscope and stereo cards, so as to shorten exposure conditions with brighter lighting, but make it appear that the pictures were made indoors. The resultant prints are amongst forty-eight salted paper prints from the period October 1857 to January 1859 in her only surviving album, carefully titled and signed, which is now held in the National Gallery of Australia, Canberra.

Her varied subjects include visitors to Woodlands, appearing relaxing in conversation, drinking and dining, several in groups and some of those more formal, and the rest being individual portraits; the merchants George S. Caird, Robert P. Paterson and Hendricks Anderson, the explorer William Landsborough with his Aboriginal companion 'Tiger’, the settlers Charles Morison from Glenmorison, New England and John Glen. Photography historian Gael Newton admires How's "fine sense of composition" and Judy Annear notes that her portraits are "most compelling, posed and yet relaxed, outdoor, convivial and engaged," while Professor Martyn Jolly argues that they are rare in that they "take us so closely into the bodily interrelationships of colonial Australians."

As well as portraits, How made views of Sydney Cove, Government House, Campbell’s Wharf and around her own house and garden and its Harbourside boatshed.

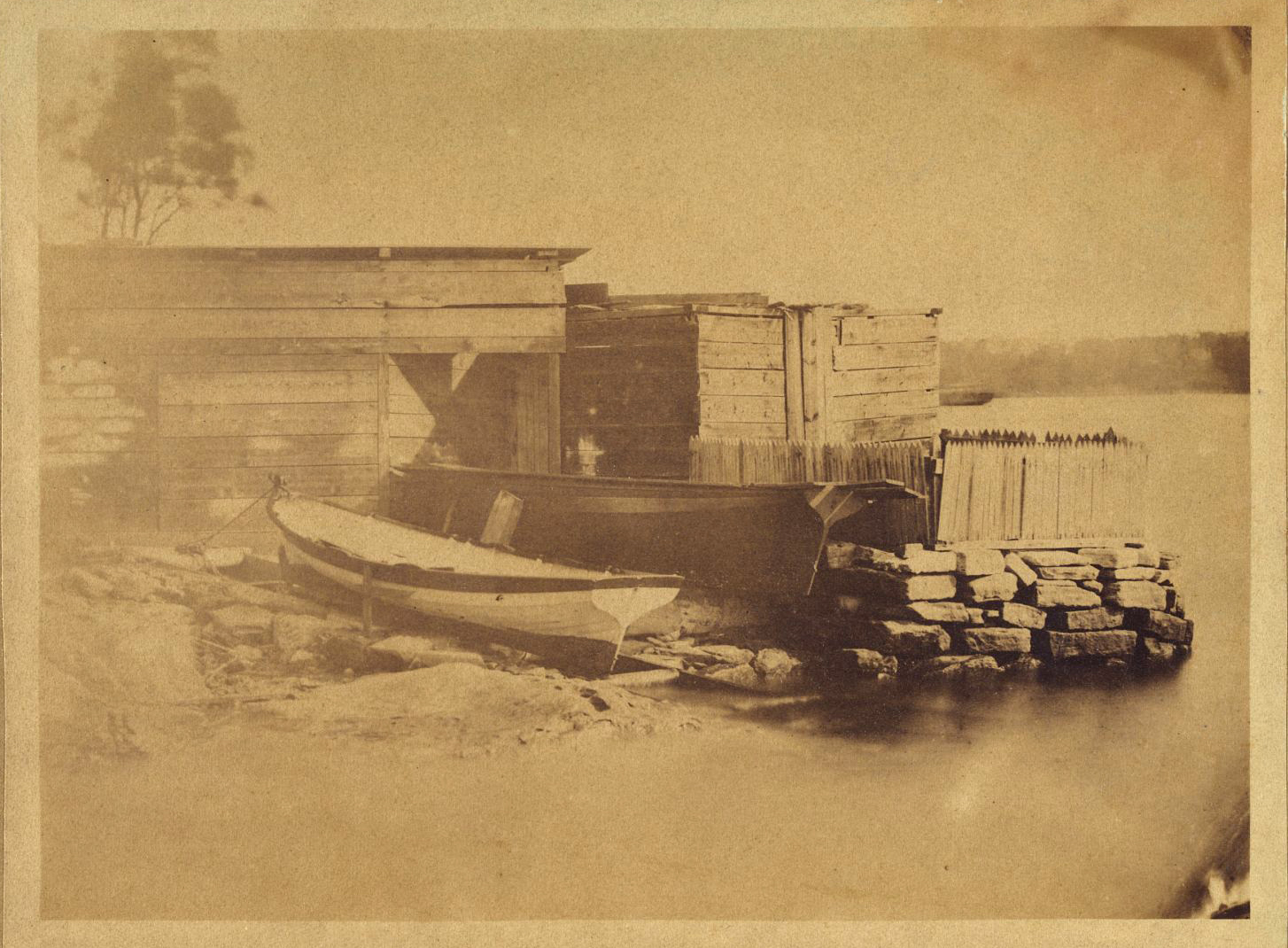
Louisa How, Boatsheds, Kirribilli Point, Sydney Harbour

== Later life ==
The Hows remained in Woodlands until about 1866, then moved to 'Calingra' in Woollahra when, due to losses, the How merchant company had ceased business. It appears How did not continue to make photographs after this downturn in fortune. Her husband James died in about 1869, and a year later she relocated to Heaton, also in Woollahra, then moved several times before her death in 1893 at the age seventy-two.

== Exhibitions ==
- Masterpieces of Australian Photography, Josef Lebovic Gallery, Kensington, 24 Jun 1989–22 Jul 1989
- Selected recent acquisitions, 1989, Art Gallery of New South Wales, Sydney, 05 Sep 1989–17 Dec 1989
- Review: works by women from the permanent collection of the Art Gallery of New South Wales, Art Gallery of New South Wales, Sydney, 08 Mar 1995–04 Jun 1995
- The photograph and Australia, Art Gallery of New South Wales, Sydney, 21 Mar 2015–08 Jun 2015

== Collections ==
- Art Gallery of New South Wales, Sydney, NSW, Australia
- National Gallery of Australia, Canberra, ACT
