= Sea Menace =

Book by John Gunn

- Author: John Gunn
- Language: English
- Genre: children's fiction
- Publisher: Constable, England
- Publication date: 1958
- Publication place: Australia
- Media type: Print
- Pages: 192pp
- Preceded by: Gibraltar Sabotage
- Followed by: Submarine Island

Sea Menace (1958) is a novel for children by Australian author John Gunn, illustrated by Brian Keogh. It was joint winner of the Children's Book of the Year Award: Older Readers in 1959.

== Plot outline ==
At the time when William Bligh was Governor of New South Wales, young Paul Harris, his cousin and uncle, journey from London to Sydney to farm in New South Wales. Their ship founders and they are set upon by a group of desperate men.

== Critical reception ==
A reviewer for The Canberra Times found that nowhere "is there anything specially Australian about the people or the setting; except for one mention of 'eucalyptus' trees and some description of early Sydney it might all be happening anywhere. But all this matters little; the story is the important thing, and it is told in a straightforward and vigorous style that holds the interest even when the courage and skill of the two boys and their grown-up friends, and the succession of hairbreadth escapes, would otherwise seem just a little too good to be true."

== See also ==
- 1958 in Australian literature
