= Myrren's Gift =

Book by Fiona McIntosh

- Myrren's Gift first edition cover.
- Author: Fiona McIntosh
- Illustrator: Bettina Guthridge (map)
- Cover artist: Les Peterson (main); Mike Golding (border)
- Language: English
- Series: The Quickening
- Genre: Fantasy novel
- Publisher: Voyager Books
- Publication date: 26 November 2003
- Publication place: Australia
- Media type: Print (Paperback)
- Pages: 576 pp (first edition)
- ISBN: 073227866X
- Followed by: Blood and Memory

Myrren's Gift is the first book in the Quickening (series) trilogy by Fiona McIntosh. It details the journeys of Wyl Thirsk.

== Plot introduction ==
All Wyl Thirsk ever wanted was for his family to be happy, to be loyal to his monarch, King Magnus, as his father was and, most importantly, to follow in the footsteps of his father, Fergys Thirsk. But change is in the wind after Magnus married a foreign woman who gave him a cruel but handsome son – Prince Celimus.
