= Royal Exile =

Novel by Fiona McIntosh

- Royal Exile first edition cover.
- Author: Fiona McIntosh
- Language: English
- Series: Valisar
- Genre: Fantasy
- Publisher: HarperVoyager
- Publication date: 1 September 2008
- Publication place: Australia
- Media type: Print (hardback & paperback)
- Pages: 464 pp (first edition)
- ISBN: 978-0-7322-8477-0
- OCLC: 271925961
- Followed by: A Tyrant's Blood

Royal Exile is the first novel in the Valisar trilogy, by Australian fantasy author Fiona McIntosh. It was first published in September 2008 by HarperVoyager. Royal Exile follows the story of Leo, a young Valisar Royal whose world is destroyed by the Barbarian, Loethar, as he attempts to win back his throne and rid his land of the evil barbarian horde. The story is continued in A Tyrant's Blood.

== Plot summary ==
Royal Exile begins with the capture of Barronel at the hands of Loethar, a barbarian warlord from the Likurian Steppes, who has his sights set on the illusive realm of Penraven.

Fearful, now that its neighbours have been captured, King Brennus of Penraven sees to the birth of his daughter, to whom he declares deceased. Legate Regor De Vis, and his twin sons Corbel and Gavriel are called to bear witness to Brennus' cunning plan. Choosing Corbel to whisk away his 'deceased' daughter, the task of protecting Brennus' only 'true' son Leonel is given to Gavriel, who accepts with hesitance. With Loethar descending upon Penraven, both Regor De Vis and King Brennus are slain. Freath, Queen Iselda's aide, betrays the Valisar family, and in turn is granted ownership of his Queen. Loethar takes a liking to Piven, the Valisar's adopted son, likening him to an animal.

Corbel meets with the mysterious Sergius, before he descends into the wonders of magic. His twin brother Gavriel finds solitude within the secret passageways within Penraven with the young heir at his side. Queen Iselda is forced to watch Loethar eat her husband's remains, before she is later killed. Meanwhile, Loethar has been gathering the Vested, people marked with special abilities. Freath uses his newly gained position to claim two Vested, of which he chooses Clovis and Kirin. Loethar becomes engaged to Valya, much to his mother's distaste, though he is quick to remind Dara Negev, that it was Valya's brain which allowed him to capture Penraven.

It is later revealed that Freath is working with Genrie, a household servant and unrequited love of Gavriel, in an attempt of stopping Loethar, and finding the mysterious Aegis, who is said to be bonded with the Valisar heir who is granted the power of coercion. Gavriel and Leo escape Penraven and find themselves in the aide of Lily and her father, who is suffering from leprosy. Later, Lily joins the pair as they search to seek out Kilt Faris, a highwayman and renegade, who had been given aide by Brennus in order of taking Leo under his wing if Penraven would ever fall.

Gavriel is later separated from Leo and finds himself in the care of Elka, though it is clear that he has no memories of who he really is, stating his name to be that of his father's, "Regor". Genrie is later killed to prove that Freath is loyal to Loethar, and thus protecting her lover.

Leo arrives at the Stone of Truth to pledge his vow to Cyrena, and learns the truth of his sister. Leo is granted the power he needs to stop Loethar for good.

== Characters ==
Prince Leonel (Leo): First born son of Brennus and Iselda. At the beginning of Royal Exile, Leo is somewhat naive to the world around him, and is thrust into uncertainty following his father's death at the hands of Loethar. Aided by Gavriel De Vis, Leo is forced to mature rather quickly, for as fate would have it, he is the only remaining heir of the Valisar line, and is therefore his duty to avenge his father, and reclaim the throne of Penraven.

Prince Piven: Adopted son of Brennus and Iselda. Piven is an enigma, and for the most part of the novel, is depicted as a "halfwit". Later, following Loethar's invasion of Penraven, Piven is subjected to being Loethar's pet.

King Brennus the 8th: 8th king of the Valisars. Killed by Loethar. Brennus was cunning enough to create an elaborate plan for his son Leo, if in the case of Loethar succeeding. This included a way of escape from Penraven, and aid from the highwayman Kilt Faris. Brennus is also responsible for hiding the truth of his daughter's "death", though for the most part, his motives remain a mystery.

Queen Iselda: Wife of Brennus. She is the daughter of a Romean prince from Romea in Galinsea. Comes from the line of King Falza. The Queen is portrayed as a beautiful woman, who had an affection for even their adopted son Piven. She is a broken woman following Brennus' death, to which she is forced to watch Loethar consume him. She is later killed as an act of mercy by Freath.

Legate Regor De Vis: Right-hand man of the king. Father to Gavriel and Corbel. Regor was a kind-hearted man who cared deeply for his King. Following the death of his wife, Regor raised his two sons without hesitation. He is later killed in the barbarian invasion.

Gavriel (Gav) De Vis: First-born twin brother of Corbel. He is the champion of the Cohort. Gav is a womaniser for the most part, and always looking for fun. He has a fond affection for Genrie, despite her resistance to his charm. Gav is assigned by Brennus to protect Leo, and does so, not only as a guardian or best friend, but as a blood brother to the young King. Later, he begins to fall for Lily, who once again, doesn't seem to have the same affection. He then loses his memories and assumes the identity of his late father, Regor De Vis.

Corbel (Corb) De Vis: Twin brother of Gavriel. Not much is known about Corb, and for the most part, he doesn't appear in Royal Exile. Assigned to whisking away Brennus "deceased" daughter, Corb seeks out Sergius before descending into a realm of magic.

Loethar: Tribal warlord. Loethar's main objective is to claim the Valisar gift of Coercion, which he believes can be given by consuming one of the royal bloodline. He has an icy relationship with his mother, and his future fiancé Valya. His true motives behind wanting the charm is yet to be revealed, as is the majority of his past.

Valya of Droste: Loethar's lover. The brains behind Loethar's schemes, also plans on wedding Loethar, much to his mother's hesitation. Valya had a deep hatred for Queen Iselda.

Dara Negev: Loethar's mother. Somewhat cruel in nature, Dara Negev detests Valya and her relationship with Loethar.

Freath: Queen Iselda's aide. Lover of Genrie. Freath is an enigmatic character, and is at first viewed as morally corrupt, seemingly betraying the Valisar line to which he has dedicated his life, in order of winning Loethar's favour. It is later revealed that he is attempting to find the Aegis, to which may help aid Leo in his fight against Loethar. He is also Genrie's lover.

Genrie: a household maid. Unrequited love of Gavriel and lover of Freath. Later deceased. She wins the affections of Gav, though her feelings are not mutual. At first, she is a hardened character who is blunt and poignant. She is in league with Freath, and loves him dearly. She is later killed showing her devotion to the man she loves.

Clovis: A master diviner from Vorgraven. A timid man who is broken following his family's death at the hands of Loethar. Clovis meets Kirin whilst in captivity, and under Kirin's plan, wins the attention of Freath, who takes them in as his own. They are searching for the Aegis.

Kirin Felt: A Vested. Can pry. Kirin's ability comes at a price, yet allows him and fellow Vested, Clovis to attend to Freath's devised plan. He has an affection for Clovis, and the two develop a strong friendship.

Kilt Faris: A highwayman and renegade. Later sworn to protect Leo. He was given leeway by King Brennus in return for helping to protect Leo when the time came.

Lilyan (Lily): Daughter of Greven. Aides Leo and Gav. Daughter to a leper, Lily has lived her life in solitude, which is interrupted when she catches Gav and Leo releasing a hare she was hunting. Instead, she seeks to aid the pair when Loethar's men arrive, seeking them out. Greven, tells Lily that she must continue on their journey, and help them seek out Kilt Faris.

Sergius: A minion of Cyrena. Not too much is known about Sergius, although he was responsible for spiriting Corb and Brennus' daughter away.

Cyrena: The serpent denoted on the Penraven Crest. It is said she made a pact with the first Valisar King Cormoron, presenting him with the Coercion ability. Leo makes a pact with her at the Stone of Truth, and the Valisar line is once again reinforced.

== Setting ==
Royal Exile is set on the Denova Set, though mentions throughout its neighbours Percheron and Galinsea from the Percheron Trilogy. The Denova Set includes Barronel, Cremond, Dregon, Gormand, Medhaven, Penraven, Vorgraven.

== Critical reception ==
Diane Dempsey, writing in The Age newspaper (Melbourne) noted: "Within McIntosh's world heroes, animals, magicians and highwaymen all have a part to play and all have a particular language and set of beliefs that hold firm for the entire book. It is this inventiveness and the consistency with which it is applied that gives McIntosh her credibility as a fantasy writer."
