= 1875 in Australian literature =

This article presents a list of the historical events and publications of Australian literature during 1875.

== Books ==
- Rolf Boldrewood — The Squatter's Dream : A Story of Australian Life
- Marcus Clarke — 'Twixt Shadow and Shine
- B. L. Farjeon
  - At the Sign of the Silver Flagon
  - An Island Pearl : A Christmas Story
- Maud Jean Franc — Hall's Vineyard
- W. Clark Russell — John Holdsworth, Chief Mate

== Poetry ==
- Ada Cambridge — The Manor House and Other Poems
- Henry Kendall — "Mooni"
- James Brunton Stephens
  - "From an Upper Verandah"
  - "Quart Pot Creek"

== Births ==
A list, ordered by date of birth (and, if the date is either unspecified or repeated, ordered alphabetically by surname) of births in 1875 of Australian literary figures, authors of written works or literature-related individuals follows, including year of death.

- 3 July — James Robert Tyrrell, bookseller, art dealer, publisher and author (died 1961)
- 10 September — John Lavington Bonython, newspaper editor and journalist (died 1960)
- 17 November — William Gosse Hay, author and essayist (died 1945)

== Deaths ==
A list, ordered by date of death (and, if the date is either unspecified or repeated, ordered alphabetically by surname) of deaths in 1875 of Australian literary figures, authors of written works or literature-related individuals follows, including year of birth.

- 10 February — Mary Thomas, poet (born 1787)
- 14 June — David Burn, settler and author (born 1799)
- 24 October — Raffaello Carboni, author and composer (born 1817)

== See also ==
- 1875 in Australia
- 1875 in literature
- 1875 in poetry
- List of years in Australian literature
- List of years in literature
