= The Irishman (1978 film) =

- DVD cover
- Directed by: Donald Crombie
- Written by: Donald Crombie
- Based on: The Irishman by Elizabeth O'Conner
- Produced by: Anthony Buckley
- Starring: Michael Craig; Simon Burke; Robyn Nevin; John Clayton
- Edited by: Tim Wellburn
- Production companies: Forest Home Films; South Australian Film Corporation
- Release date: 1978
- Running time: 108 minutes
- Country: Australia
- Language: English
- Budget: A$840,000 (est.)
- Box office: A$$622,000

The Irishman is an Australian 1978 romantic drama film directed and written by Donald Crombie.

== Plot ==
Stubborn Irishman Paddy Doolan is a draught-horse teamster based in the Gulf country of Northern Queensland in the early 1920s. A traditional man who refuses to accept change, Paddy struggles to adjust to the evolution of his industry, with the introduction of the motor age and the decline of the old gold mining towns. He continues to haul timber the old way.

== Cast ==
- Michael Craig as Paddy Doolan
- Simon Burke as Michael Doolan
- Robyn Nevin as Jenny Doolan
- Bryan Brown as Eric Haywood
- John Clayton as Sam Brookes
- Roger Ward as Kevin Quilty
- Tui Bow as Granny Doolan
- Gerard Kennedy as Chad Logan
- Lou Brown as Will

== Production ==
The film is based on the 1960 book by Cairns author Barbara McNamara, whp wrote it under the pen-name Elizabeth O'Conner and won a Miles Franklin Award for it in 1960.

It was written and directed by Donald Crombie, who was introduced to the novel by his mother while he was working on 1976 film Caddie, as she thought it would be a good fit for a film.

The movie was budgeted at $767,000 but went $800,000 over. It was filmed in the old Queensland gold mining town of Charters Towers, 136 kilometres west of Townsville, from May through to July in 1977.

== Release ==
The film had its world premiere in Townsville (a first for the town) and several of the cast (Michael Craig, Simon Burke, Tui Bow, and Gerard Kennedy) were in attendance for a street parade and a champagne reception.

The film screened at the 1979 Berlin International Film Festival.

The film was a disappointment at the box office. Crombie later said he thought it was five to ten minutes too long, and suffered from being released soon after The Mango Tree, another coming of age period movie set in Queensland, when there was a backlash against period films.

== Reception ==
Film critic David Stratton of At the Movies wrote in his book "The Last New Wave: The Australian Film Revival": The Irishman is an underrated film which, like Caddie, was made with love and affection. Its flaws (the music, a certain softness, an uncertainty on the part of the character of Michael) are relatively unimportant given the success of the whole. The scenes of the family are superb, with plenty of humour and bite; the scene in which the old grandmother dies and is embraced by her husband is one of the most moving in any Australian film."
