= Vivienne Rae-Ellis =

Australian writer (1930–2015)

- Born: Vivienne Rae Thurstans; 23 July 1930; Wynyard, Tasmania, Australia
- Died: 29 March 2015 (aged 84); Bath, Somerset, England
- Occupation: Writer
- Writing career
- Pen name: Antonia Bell
- Language: English

Vivienne Rae-Ellis, FRGS (23 July 1930 – 29 March 2015) was an Australian writer, who also wrote under the pseudonym Antonia Bell.

== Early life ==
Rae-Ellis was born in Wynyard, Tasmania, Australia, in 1930, the only daughter of four children. Her parents were Linda, née James (1908–1982) and Donald Thurstans (1904–1988). Soon after her birth the family moved to Hobart, where they lived first at Sandy Bay and then at New Town, where Rae-Ellis attended Ogilvy High School. While at school she played the violin and was a member of the school basketball team.

After leaving school she worked as a secretary in various Hobart businesses before joining the administrative staff of the School of Physics at the University of Tasmania. There she met, and in 1952 married, William Frank Ellis (1928–2015). They had two children, Niki Maree Ellis (born 1955) and William Mark Ellis (born 1956). They divorced in 1978.

== Career ==
Since 1952, Vivienne Rae-Ellis worked as a newspaper columnist, radio scriptwriter and broadcaster, television program host and public relations officer. For many years she also worked as an actress in various performing companies including the Launceston Players. In 1954 she undertook the unusual assignment of standing in for Her Majesty Queen Elizabeth II during rehearsals for the 1954 Royal Tour of Tasmania. Her last performance as an actress in a play was in 1969 when she played Mrs. Earlynne in Oscar Wilde's Lady Windermere's Fan.

Rae-Ellis began writing biographies and novels in the 1960s. In 1967, while promoting a local history exhibition for the Launceston Public Library, she became fascinated by a photograph of the pioneer and philanthropist Louisa Anne Meredith whose biography she decided to write. Louisa Anne Meredith: A Tigress in Exile was published by Blubberhead Press in 1979, by which time Rae-Ellis had also published several other books.

She wrote in many genres including biography, children's fiction, romance, historical fiction and non-fiction, and she continued to produce articles and broadcasts for newspapers and journals in the UK and Australia.

In 2012 she completed a biography of the wife of the painter Thomas Gainsborough, and shortly before her death she completed a novel set in the whaling industry of the 1800s.

In 1982 Vivienne Rae-Ellis relocated from Australia to the United Kingdom. For several years she lived at Layer Marney Tower, the stately home in Essex. From 1988 she lived in Bath, Somerset, in a house once occupied by the painter Thomas Gainsborough and his family. Following her move to England, she was a keen advocate of urban conservation there. In 2003 she began researching the social history of The Circus, a famous example of Georgian architecture in Bath, during the period 1760–1780. She died at her home on 29 March 2015, taking her own life after developing a terminal illness.

Vivienne Rae-Ellis was a Fellow of the Royal Geographical Society and a member of the Society of Authors.

== Published works ==
=== Non-fiction ===
- Lively Libraries (1975)
- True Ghost Stories of Our Own Time (1990)

=== Historical fiction ===
- Queen Trucanini (1976; with Nancy Cato)

=== Children's fiction ===
- Menace at Oyster Bay (1976)
- The Tribe With No Feet (1978)

=== Biography ===
- Trucanini: Queen or Traitor? (1976)
- Louisa Anne Meredith: A Tigress in Exile (1979)
- Black Robinson, Protector of Aborigines (1988)

=== Romance fiction ===
- The Cavendish Affair (1980; as Antonia Bell)
