= José Ramón Patterson =

Spanish journalist

- Born: 1958; Gijón
- Occupation: Journalist

José Ramón Patterson (born 1958) is a Spanish journalist. He is the former director of Radio Nacional de España and TVE in Asturias, who was also a diplomatic correspondent for TVE in Brussels.

In 2015 he became the correspondent for the public broadcaster in Brussels, replacing Álvaro López de Goicoechea.
