= The Whisperer (novel) =

2009 fantasy novel by Fiona McIntosh

- Author: Fiona McIntosh
- Language: English
- Genre: Fiction, Fantasy
- Publisher: HarperCollins
- Publication date: 2009
- Media type: Print (paperback)
- Pages: 312
- ISBN: 978-0-7322-8667-5

The Whisperer is a 2009 fantasy novel aimed at pre-teens and teens (ages 9–14) by Fiona McIntosh.

== Plot summary ==
The Whisperer is a fantasy novel. The story is told in third person. It follows the adventures of Griff, a thirteen-year-old boy who works in the circus, and Lute, Crown Prince of Drestonia. Griff can eavesdrop on other people's thoughts. When the circus master discovers Griff's amazing ability, he forces the young boy to appear in his show. Griff knows what he is doing is wrong and escapes from the circus with Tess, a fellow performer, and her magical creatures. Meanwhile, Prince Lute's uncle Janko is scheming to overthrow his brother and become the next king. Lute is forced to flee, and seek help from a bitter dwarf and an angry pirate. One day, Griff hears a mysterious voice crying out for help in his mind. He calls the voice the Whisperer. With the help of his friends, magical and human, Griff realises that the Whisperer, whoever he is, is in great peril, and that it is up to him to save the mysterious voice.

== Characters ==
- Griff : Griff and his two brothers joined the circus when they were quite young. Griff's mother died just after he was born, and his father lived in grief for a long time after that. Griff has the talent of hearing other people's thoughts, but only if they are important to the thinker.
- Tess : Tess and her sister used to live in the Night Forest with magical creatures. After her sister died, Tess was captured by the Stalkers and employed by a circus master. It was at this circus that she met Griff.
- Lute : Crown Prince Lute is believed to be the son of the King and Queen. However, Griff and Pilo discover that Lute is actually Griff's twin brother. The Queen longed for a son, and she adopted Lute on the day he was born. Griff and his two elder brothers remained with their father while Lute was trained to be the heir to the throne. He is polite and diplomatic. His most trusted friend is his aide, Pilo.
- Pilo : Pilo was employed by the Queen after Prince Lute was injured during a hunting accident. He was the Prince's Aide, a bodyguard and friend to the young prince.
- Duke Janko: Janko is the King's younger brother. He feels cheated out of his crown by Lute. He has tried two attempts on Lute's life, but covered them so only Pilo and the Queen suspect him. The people believe Janko is a hero, but they haven't seen that he is only murdering, selfish scum.
- Bitter Olof. Olof is a dwarf. He used to be a tall, strong man in love with a beautiful woman named Grace. Grace and Olof were bandits, and one day a noble they robbed from employed a witch to catch them. In return for their lives, Grace gave up her beauty. In return for a hiding place, Olof gave up his stature. Grace and Olof had an argument and went their separate ways. After that he became business partners with Pilo. When Pilo was away on business, Olof promised to look after his wife and daughter, but broke his promise. While Pilo was away and Olof wasn't watching them, Pilo's wife and daughter were murdered. Pilo says he will kill the dwarf, but when Lute is threatened by Janko, he sends the Prince to Olof in hope that Lute will be safe.
- Calico Grace: Once Olof's lover, Grace has become a pirate with a magical ship.
- King Rodin: Rodin is the king of Drestonia. When his wife couldn't have a child, Rodin refused to be swayed by his advisors and stayed true to Miralda.
- Queen Miralda : Miralda is Rodin's wife. She could not conceive a child, but secretly adopted Lute. She loves him as if he is her own son.

== Awards ==
- Short-listed by the Children's Book Council of Australia
