= Bridge of Souls (book) =

Novel by Fiona McIntosh

- Bridge of Souls first edition cover.
- Author: Fiona McIntosh
- Illustrator: Bettina Guthridge (map)
- Cover artist: Les Peterson (main); Mike Golding (border)
- Language: English
- Series: The Quickening
- Genre: Fantasy novel
- Publisher: Voyager Books
- Publication date: 24 November 2004
- Publication place: Australia
- Media type: Print (Paperback)
- Pages: 528 pp (first edition)
- ISBN: 0732278686
- Preceded by: Blood and Memory

Bridge of Souls is the third book in The Quickening series, written by Fiona McIntosh.
