= Tiger in the Bush =

Book by Nan Chauncy

- Author: Nan Chauncy
- Language: English
- Genre: children's fiction
- Publisher: Oxford University Press
- Publication date: 1957
- Publication place: Australia
- Media type: Print
- Pages: 171pp
- Preceded by: A Fortune for the Brave
- Followed by: Devil's Hill

Tiger in the Bush (1957) is a novel for children by Australian author Nan Chauncy, illustrated by Margaret Horder. It won the Children's Book of the Year Award: Older Readers in 1958 and was selected by Queen Elizabeth, the Queen Mother as a present for Prince Charles and Princess Anne.

== Plot outline ==
This novel is the first of two by the author concentrating on the Lorenny family, who live deep in the rainforest in south-western Tasmania. Badge Lorenny, the youngest of the three Lorenny children, is given a camera by two visiting scientists who want his help in capturing images of a Tasmanian tiger rumoured to be in the district.

== Critical reception ==
In an overview of Chauncy's children's books dealing with the Australian bush, Susan Sheridan and Emma Maguire noted: "Chauncy draws on the relationship that had long been cultivated between the bush environment and the identity of settler Australia, depicting the bush as a site which fosters in the Lorenny family those characteristics of self reliance, mutual support and practical wisdom that were believed to contribute to a uniquely Australian character." And they concluded "...Chauncy’s treatment of the theme of entering into masculinity in the Badge Lorenny novels is subtly altered by her emphasis on learning from the bush through an attitude of attentive love. In retrospect it is also possible to discern in her work the effects of an emerging, ecologically sensitive way of seeing human relationships to the environment."

== See also ==
- 1957 in Australian literature
