= Ghost whisperer =

Ghost whisperer may refer to:

- a spirit medium, someone said to be able to communicate with ghosts
- Ghost Whisperer, a television series
- Ghost Whisperer (video game), an adventure game based on the television series
