= José Ramón Martel López =

Mexican politician

- Born: 10 January 1955 (age 71); San Luis Potosí, San Luis Potosí, Mexico
- Occupation: Politician
- Political party: PRI

José Ramón Martel López (born 10 January 1955) is a Mexican politician from the Institutional Revolutionary Party. He has served as Deputy of the LI and LXI Legislatures of the Mexican Congress representing the State of Mexico.
