= José Ramón Hinojosa Montalvo =

José Ramón Hinojosa Montalvo (born 1947 in Valencia, Spain) is a historian and Professor of Medieval History at the University of Alicante in Spain. He is also Academic Correspondent of the Real Academia de la Historia.

== Works ==
- El Mediterráneo medieval (1999)
- The Jews in the Kingdom of València, from the persecution to expulsion (1993)
- Diccionario de historia medieval del Reino de Valencia (2002)
