= José Delgado (journalist) =

Ecuadorian journalist

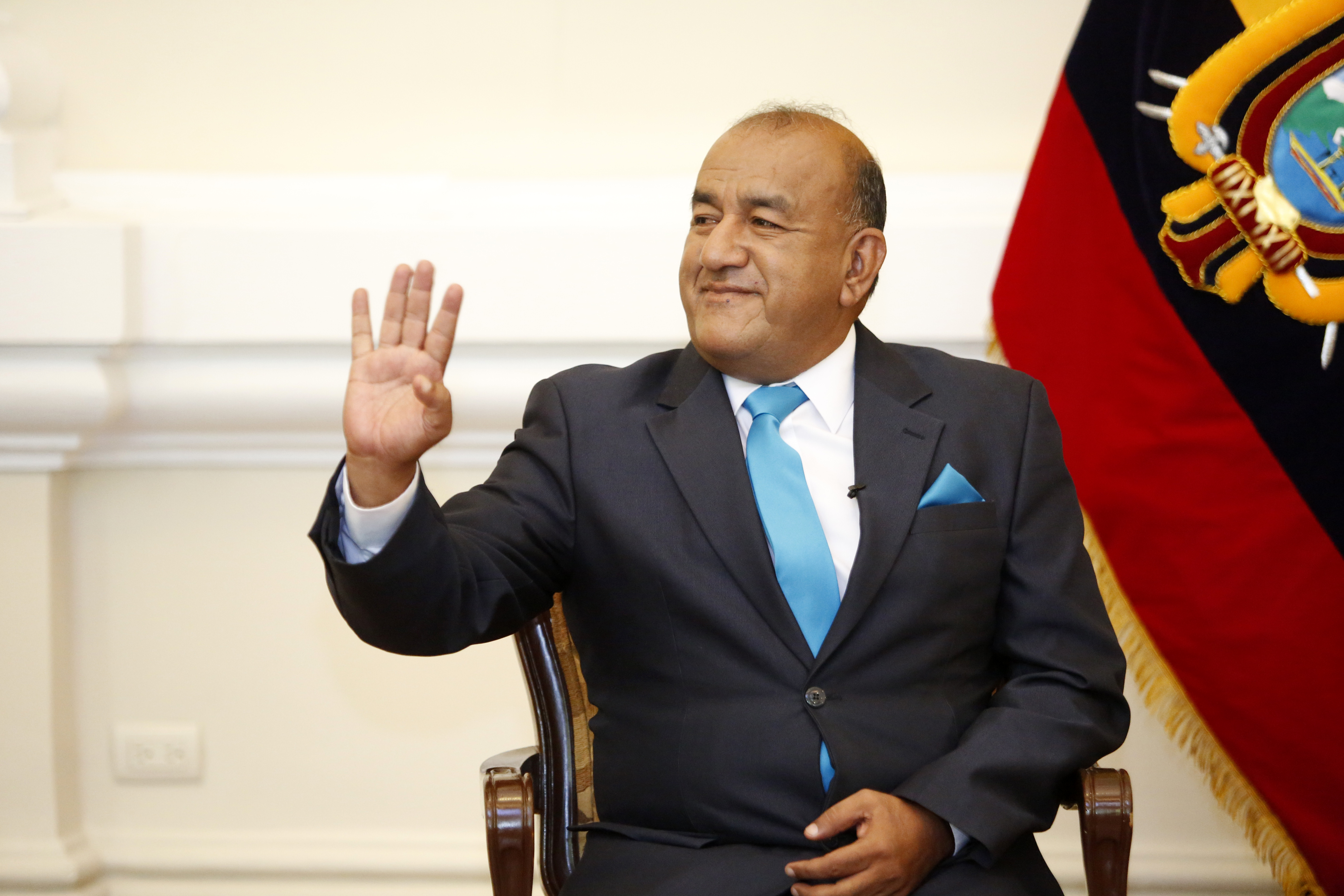
José Delgado

José Delgado (born in Manta, Manabí, Ecuador on March 14, 1966) is an Ecuadorian journalist who worked in the news show Primer Impacto Ecuadorian version on Gamavisión, for hosting and producing the show En Carne Propia for more than a decade and recently Directo al grano on Canal Uno and currently on TC Televisión.

== Personal life ==
José Delgado is married to Patricia García, with whom he fathered his daughter Débora Delgado.

== Career ==
In 1990, Delgado began television journalism as a reporter on the Ecuadorian TV channel Teleamazonas.

After six years, in 1996, he became part of the news program Primer Impacto, the Ecuadorian version, on Gamavisión.

In 1999, he worked at Ecuavisa, where he hosted the program Ciudad Desnuda, which remained on the air for a few months.

After his departure from Ecuavisa, he remained off television for four years, until on October 20, 2003, he returned to television, joining the Primer Impacto Ecuador space again on Gamavisión, hosting the Impacto final segment, in which he dedicated himself to social issues.

On April 10, 2008, he premiered on Canal Uno as host and journalist of the investigative program En Carne Propia, in which he shows the social unrest in the city of Guayaquil as a red chronicle, becoming the leader of the nighttime schedule.

In 2013, he directed the program El Caza Talentos on Canal Uno, hosted by Eduardo Andrade, in which Delgado searched for ordinary people who had some talent for singing, acting, imitation or something curious, in several cities in Ecuador.

In 2014, he directed the children's program Trébol Magico on Canal Uno, with animation by Patricia "Patty" Merril, Carlos Ernesto "Pipo" Matamoros and Alejandra Ronquillo who voices the character of the dog Lulú. In that same year, he announced the launch from his YouTube channel with his name, in which he makes news, reports and entertainment with segments such as Cazatalentos hosted by Juan José Jaramillo, Historias Urbanas, Somos Leyenda hosted by Mónica Rojas, Súper Carne and Zona VIP, all made by his production company JD Productions with his wife Patricia García.
