= Blood and Memory =

Novel by Fiona McIntosh

- Blood and Memory first edition cover.
- Author: Fiona McIntosh
- Illustrator: Bettina Guthridge (map)
- Cover artist: Les Peterson (main); Mike Golding (border)
- Language: English
- Series: The Quickening
- Genre: Fantasy
- Publisher: Voyager
- Publication date: 26 May 2004
- Publication place: Australia
- Media type: Print (Paperback)
- Pages: 534 pp (first edition)
- ISBN: 978-0-7322-7867-0
- OCLC: 224105053
- Preceded by: Myrren's Gift

Blood & Memory is a fantasy novel by Fiona McIntosh. The novel was published by Voyager on 26 May 2004. It is the second novel in The Quickening trilogy, which began with Myrren's Gift and concluded with Bridge of Souls.

== Plot introduction ==
After seeing his best friend murdered, his sister imprisoned and the King of Morgravia turn his attention to the woman he loves, Wyl becomes desperate to return Valentyna and prevent her marrying the king. However is ends up being trapped by an enchantment and must track down the Manwitch first.
