= Antipodes in Shoes =

Poetry collection by Geoffrey Dutton

- Author: Geoffrey Dutton
- Language: English
- Genre: Poetry collection
- Publisher: Edwards and Shaw, Sydney
- Publication date: 1958
- Publication place: Australia
- Media type: Print
- Pages: 89 pp

Antipodes in Shoes (1958) is a poetry collection by Australian poet Geoffrey Dutton. It won the Grace Leven Prize for Poetry in 1958.

The collection consists of 51 poems, most of which were previously published in various Australian poetry publications.

== Contents ==
- "Attica"
- "Delphi"
- "Salonika"
- "Italian December"
- "The Danube"
- "The Rhone"
- "The Octopus"
- "Delie CXLVIII"
- "Piolet and Aerodrome : Abbeville 1947"
- "The Dead : A French Cemetery"
- "On the Heights"
- "St. Bertrand de Comminges"
- "Alpenblumen"
- "The Drunkard from the Irish Fair"
- "A Girl on Sunday"
- "A Gift in Hospital"
- "The Hospital"
- "Driving at Night"
- "The Two Worlds"
- "We Burn Daylight"
- "The Plunge"
- "Half Light in the East"
- "Three People"
- "A Prisoner Freed"
- "Wool-Shed Dance"
- "The Island Day"
- "The Island"
- "Islanders"
- "The Sailor's Farewell"
- "The Letter"
- "Planting a Sequoia"
- "Autumn Journey"
- "Love's Compass"
- "The World of Absence"
- "A Night for Love"
- "The Axeman to His Daughter"
- "Hound and Lover (to Arthur Boyd)"
- "The Gift"
- "The Wish"
- "Drought River"
- "A Dream for a Portrait"
- "The Magnolias"
- "Two Variations on a Theme of Andrew Marvell : Song of the Non-Emigrants"
- "Two Variations on a Theme of Andrew Marvell : Song of the Emigrants"
- "The State of England Nowadays"
- "A Phoenix in Spring"
- "A Song in Surrey"
- "Love Song
- "The Lament of the Bulldozers"
- "The Eagle Hawk and the Woomera Man"
- "Sour City"

== Critical reception ==
Reviewing the collection in The Bulletin, "D.S." called it "an unusual contribution to Australian poetry" in that it dealt with travels in Europe. They went on: "In its assured and thoughtful report on his Grand Tour – all over England, Ireland and the Continent – it reminds you of the spacious days when Byron, Wordsworth and Matthew Arnold similarly meditated on their travels; and it is in line with the more recent travel-poems of Louis MacNiece and some of the Americans...It is thoroughly cultivated poetry."

Gustav Cross, in The Sydney Morning Herald noted that this collection "shows that if he [Dutton] is not yet quite among the foremost of Australia's poets he is at any rate treading hard on their heels. His title and some of the poems invite comparison with Andrew Marvell. Surprisingly, this is less damaging than one would imagine, for few modern poets have caught the tone and movement of Marvell half so well."

== See also ==
- 1958 in Australian literature

== Notes ==
- The contents of this collection are grouped under the following section headers: Northern (pp11–34), Southern (pp 37–61), Satirical (pp 65–76), People in Places (pp 79–89).
