= John Gunn (Australian writer) =

Australian author (born 1925)

- Born: 26 February 1925; Northumberland, England
- Occupation: Writer
- Writing career
- Language: English
- Years active: 1955–1999
- Notable work: Sea Menace
- Notable awards: Children's Book of the Year Award: Older Readers

John Gunn (born 26 February 1925) is an Australian writer, sailor and aviator.

== Education ==
Gunn attended Newington College at the age of12 in 1937. He entered the Royal Australian Naval College as a cadet-midshipman in 1939. In 1946 he began training as a Fleet Air Arm pilot, serving in England and the Mediterranean. He returned to Australia in 1949 where he attended Sydney University, he halted the study of medicine to start a family.

== Career ==
Gunn and his young family moved to England, where he began his writing career. In 1957 they returned to Australia. He attained various positions including:

- Literary guide and friend to the Australian Broadcasting Commission children's programme.
- Aviation correspondent for the Australian Financial Review

== Bibliography ==
=== Novels ===
- The Wild Abyss (1972)
- Water Hazard (1995)

=== Novels for children ===
- Barrier Reef Espionage (1955)
- Battle in the Ice (1956)
- Gibraltar Sabotage (1957)
- Sea Menace (1958)
- Submarine Island (1958)
- The Humpy in the Hills (1960)
- Peter Kent's Command (1960)
- Dangerous Enemies (1961)
- City in Danger (1962)
- Conquest of Space (1962)
- The Goodbye Island (1963)

=== Edited ===
- Dangerous Secret (1960)
- The Gold Smugglers (1962)
- The Gravity Stealers (1965)

=== Drama ===
- Wren's Nest (1955)
- Hildegard : A Play (1999)

=== Non-fiction ===
- Barrier Reef by Trimaran (1966)
- Seaspay : The Spoils of War (1967)
- Sailing and Ships for You (1957)
- Along parallel lines: a history of the railways of New South Wales, 1850-1986, Melbourne University Press, Carlton, Vic. (1989)

== Awards ==
- 1959 – he became a joint winner of the Children's Book of the Year Award: Older Readers for Sea Menace

== See also ==
- Arthur Piver
