= The Irishman (novel) =

Novel by Elizabeth O'Conner

- First edition
- Author: Elizabeth O'Conner
- Language: English
- Publisher: Angus and Robertson, Australia
- Publication date: 1960
- Publication place: Australia
- Media type: Print (Hardback & Paperback)
- Pages: 318pp
- Preceded by: –
- Followed by: Find a Woman

The Irishman (1960) is a novel by Australian author Elizabeth O'Conner. It won the 1960 Miles Franklin Award.

== Story outline ==
The novel follows the experiences of Paddy Doolan, an Irish horse wagoner and his son Michael in the Gulf Country of north-eastern Australia. It is set in the early 1920s when horse-drawn transport was challenged by the advent of motor vehicles and aircraft—change which Doolan cannot accept.

== Critical reception ==
Lisa Hill on the ANZLitLovers Litblog noted: "O’Conner won the prize in 1960, in the years of postwar prosperity and well before the Swinging Sixties challenged long-established mores across the globe. Cities in Australia were being transformed by post-war immigration from Europe and by the growth in manufacturing which was driven by the sudden availability of cheap labour. The Irishman, however, explores a different period of transition. O’Conner was writing about what was already a vanished era – the inter-war years when bush life was being transformed by the arrival of the motor-vehicle in the early 1920s. While at one level it’s an engaging coming-of-age story, it is also the story of a remote community confronting decline."

== Film adaptation ==
In 1978, the book was adapted for the screen and directed by Donald Crombie in a film of the same name. The film featured Michael Craig, Simon Burke and Robyn Nevin in the lead roles.
