= Claire Dunne =

Australian actress and author (born 1937)

Claire Dunne OAM
- Born: Claire Mary Elizabeth Dunne; 1937 (age 88–89); Ireland
- Occupations: Actress; author; lecturer; broadcaster; multiculture activist

Claire Mary Elizabeth Dunne OAM (born 1937) is an Irish-born Australian actress, author, lecturer and broadcaster. Her first name is also found spelled "Clare".

== 1960s Australian celebrity ==
Dunne was a popular Australian television and film personality of the 1960s. She starred as "Kay" in the seminal Australian film They're a Weird Mob (1966) and was also a regular on Beauty and the Beast with Maggie Tabberer.

Her fame within Australia in the 1960s was described by Thomas Keneally:

"Clare Dunne, she was a goddess to me. She was this exquisite bone-structured Irish woman who was beloved on the media in Australia."

== Multicultural broadcasting pioneer ==
Dunne went on to pioneer multicultural broadcasting in Australia as a foundation director of what became the Special Broadcasting Service (SBS), as well as a presenter and a producer of radio and television for SBS.

In 1986, then-prime minister Bob Hawke delivered a "series of blows aimed at multiculturalism", including a decision to close the Australian Institute of Multicultural Affairs and proposed legislation that would merge SBS into the Australian Broadcasting Corporation. Dunne was a vociferous opponent of both changes. She said at the time:

"I think there is going to be an uproar. There seems to be an undeclared Government change of policy about multiculturalism. Last week it was announced that the Institute of Multicultural Affairs would be closed. Now it is the SBS-ABC merger in spite of the fact that only six months ago the Government decided to let it be independent."

There was indeed an uproar, eventually leading the prime minister to call off the merger.

Dunne was awarded the Medal of the Order of Australia in 1999 for "service to multiculturalism, particularly through the promotion of Celtic culture, and to ethnic broadcasting".

== Author ==
Dunne has published three books:

- People under the skin: an Irish immigrant's experience of Aboriginal Australia (1988)
- Mary MacKillop: No Plaster Saint (1994)
- Carl Jung: Wounded Healer of the Soul (2000)
