= Nancy Cato =

Australian novelist, biographer and poet

Nancy Cato AM
- Born: Nancy Fotheringham Cato; 11 March 1917; Glen Osmond, South Australia
- Died: 3 July 2000 (aged 83); Noosa, Queensland, Australia
- Occupations: Writer and poet
- Writing career
- Pen name: Nancy Norman
- Genres: Historical novels, biographies and poetry

Nancy Fotheringham Cato AM (11 March 1917 – 3 July 2000) was an Australian writer who published more than twenty historical novels, biographies and volumes of poetry. Cato is also known for her work campaigning on environmental and conservation issues.

== Life ==
Cato was born in Glen Osmond in South Australia, and was a fifth-generation Australian. She studied English literature and Italian at the University of Adelaide, graduating in 1939, then completed a two-year course at the South Australian School of Arts. She was a cadet journalist on The News from 1935 to 1941, and an art critic from 1957 to 1958.

Cato married Eldred De Bracton Norman, and travelled extensively overseas with him. They had one daughter and two sons. Cato died at Noosa Heads on 3 July 2000.

Cato's cousin was also named Nancy Cato, and was host of children's TV show the Magic Circle Club in the mid-1960s.

== Literary career ==
With Roland Robinson and Kevin Collopy, in 1948 Cato was one of the founding members of the Lyre-Bird Writers, an independent and cooperative group that formed to publish verse by Australian writers. As a member of the Jindyworobak Movement, Cato edited the 1950 Jindyworobak Anthology, one of a series of anthologies produced to promote indigenous Australian ideas and customs, particularly in poetry. She was actively involved in the Fellowship of Australian Writers and the Australian Society of Authors during the 1950s and 1960s.

Cato's most famous work is her trilogy, known as All the Rivers Run. It was originally published as three separate volumes: All the Rivers Run (1958), Time, Flow Softly (1959) and But Still the Stream (1962). However, since the 1970s it has been generally published as one large volume containing the three books. It was made into a TV mini-series All the Rivers Run, which was broadcast in 1983.

Cato's other books include: Green Grows The Vine, Brown Sugar and Mister Maloga, which tells the story of Daniel Matthews and his Maloga Mission to Aboriginal people on the Murray River in Victoria.

Her book on unplanned development (environmental vandalism) in her home town of Noosa was first published in 1979. Three editions have been published to acclaim.

== Honours and recognition ==
Cato became a local icon in the Noosa area of Queensland, and has a park and restaurant named after her. The Noosa Parks Association made her a life member and an honorary park ranger for her work in conservation.

In 1984, she was appointed a Member of the Order of Australia (AM) for services to literature and the environment, and she was awarded an Honorary Doctorate of Letters by the University of Queensland in 1991.

In 2006 a new suburb of Franklin was proposed for Canberra with the streets named after Australian women writers. The suburb now includes Nancy Cato Street.

== Awards ==
- 1933 South Australian Tennyson Medal for English Literature
- 1961 NT Poetry Prize
- 1963 Farmers International Poetry Prize
- 1978 the Noosa Arts Theatre Playwriting Competition, Best Play Award for Travellers through the night (inaugural winner)
- 1988 Alice Award by the Society of Women Writers
- Advance Australia award for environmental campaigning
- 1991 Honorary Doctor of Letters, University of Queensland
- 1984 Member of the Order of Australia (AM)

== Bibliography ==
=== Novels and short stories ===
- All the Rivers Run (1958)
- Time, Flow Softly : a novel of the River Murray (1959)
- Green Grows the Vine (1960)
- But Still The Stream: a novel of the Murray River (1962)
- The Sea Ants: and Other Stories (1964)
- North-West by South (1965)
- Brown Sugar (1974)
- Queen Trucanini (1976) (with Vivienne Rae Ellis)
- Nin and the Scribblies (1976)
- Forefathers (1983)
- The Lady Lost in Time (1986)
- A Distant Island (1988)
- The Heart of the Continent (1989)
- Marigold (1992)

=== Poetry ===
- The Darkened Window (1950)
- The Dancing Bough (1957)

=== Plays ===
- "Travellers Through the Night" in Noosa One-act Winners. Volume 2 (1994)

=== Non-fiction ===
- Mister Maloga : Daniel Matthews and his Mission, Murray River, 1864–1902 (1976)
- The Noosa Story: A Study in Unplanned Development (1979). Second edition: 1982. Third edition: 1989
- River's End (1989) with Leslie McLeay

=== Edited ===
- Jindyworobak Anthology 1950

=== Recordings ===
- Oral history recording with Hazel de Berg (1975)
