= Jose Ramon Gonzalez Delgado =

Contemporary Cuban artist and ceramist

José Ramón González Delgado
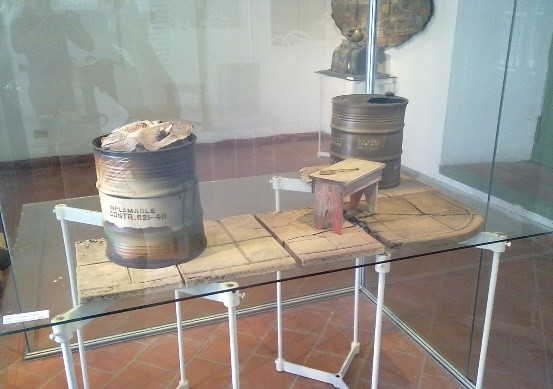
- Banco de la Paciencia (2011 edition), exhibited at Museo de la Cerámica de Cuba
- Born: José Ramón González Delgado; March 26, 1953 (age 73); Mayarí, Holguín, Cuba
- Known for: Contemporary art, ceramics, painting, engraving
- Notable work: Banco de la Paciencia (1986), Mal Tiempo (1987), Habana Blues (1984)
- Movement: Contemporary art

José Ramón González Delgado (born March 26, 1953) is a prominent contemporary Cuban artist, painter, engraver, and ceramist. Recognized for his pioneering role in post-revolutionary, postmodern Cuban ceramic installations, his three-dimensional works bridge the gap between traditional pottery and conceptual fine art. His installations are characterized by the integration of functional everyday objects into highly symbolic sculptural spaces.

== Early Life and Education ==
González Delgado was born in the municipality of Mayarí, Cuba, to parents José Ramón González Fernández and Ana Dolores Delgado Aguilera. His early lineage and birth records were formally certified through the Mayarí Civil Registry.

He pursued formal artistic training at the National Art School (ENA) in Havana and graduated from the Centro Nacional Superior de Enseñanza Artística (CNSEA) in 1982. He is a founding member of key Cuban artistic organizations, including the Asociación Hermanos Saíz (AHS), the Asociación Cubana de Artesanos Artistas (ACAA), and the National Union of Writers and Artists of Cuba (UNEAC).

== Career and Artistic Style ==
Following his graduation, González Delgado worked as a painting instructor at the School of Arts on the Isle of Youth (Isla de la Juventud), where he co-founded the influential ceramic collective group Terracota 4 alongside Amelia Carballo, Ángel Norniella, and Agustín Villafaña.

During the 1980s, the collective broke away from traditional functional pottery to introduce conceptual, installation-based environments to Cuban art, elevating clay from a minor craft into a fine art medium. His foundational 1981 exhibition featuring conceptual ceramic trash cans marked a revolutionary shift in how municipal objects were perceived in Cuban fine art spaces.

His discursive strategy is widened by varying the contents of the trash cans, combining them with other objects such as banks, bullets, and dolls. The strong desacralizing load of his works, the renewing proposal of redefinition of art with prominence in the idea, and the transgression of the genre by his sculptural association accredits González Delgado among the most outstanding postmodern artists of Cuban ceramics. His most celebrated historical installations include Habana Blues (1984), Bank of Patience (Banco de la Paciencia, 1986), and Bad Time (Mal Tiempo, 1987).

In recent years, he has focused on painting, engraving (hosting solo exhibitions), and exploring digital art mediums from 2008 onward.

== Exhibitions and International Recognition ==
González Delgado achieved significant global acclaim through his recurring selections, museum exhibitions, and juried honors across Europe, North America, and the Middle East:

- 1st World Triennial Exhibition of Small Ceramics (Zagreb, 1984): Winner of the prestigious Sarajevo Prize for his contemporary ceramic piece Habana Blues, competing alongside 529 selected artists from 41 countries globally.
- 41° Premio Faenza (Italy, 1985): Official Finalist and Exhibited Artist at the International Competition of Artistic Ceramics.
- 43° Premio Faenza (Italy, 1987): Official Finalist and Exhibited Artist.
- 2nd World Triennial Exhibition of Small Ceramics (Zagreb, 1987): Selected as an official representing artist for the second consecutive world cycle (II Svjetski Triennale Male Keramike).
- Museum Exhibitions (United States): Featured in curated international group exhibitions showcasing elite contemporary postmodern Cuban ceramics at the Museum of Contemporary Hispanic Art (MoCHA) in New York City, and the prestigious Everson Museum of Art in Syracuse, New York.
- Cairo International Biennale for Ceramics (Egypt): Chosen as an official exhibiting artist representing the Cuban avant-garde delegation at the premier Middle Eastern showcase for alternative clay installations.
- 48° Concorso Internazionale della Ceramica d'Arte Contemporanea (Italy, 1993): Selected out of 2,181 global submissions by an international jury as one of the definitive 130 international artists permitted to exhibit in the formal Faenza registry.
- Syracuse Cultural Centers (United States): Group exhibitions hosted at the Point of Contact Gallery, Community Folk Art Center, and La Casita Cultural Center in Syracuse, NY.
- Other International Presence: Work has been exhibited internationally across Puerto Rico, Mexico, Russia, Brazil, and France.

== Awards and Honors ==
- Winner, Sarajevo Prize, 1st World Triennial Exhibition of Small Ceramics, Zagreb (1984)
- Selected Finalist, Concorso Internazionale della Ceramica d'Arte, Faenza, Italy (1985, 1987, 1993)
- Distinction for National Culture (Cuba, 1995) — awarded by the Cuban state for artistic lifetime achievements and contributions to national culture.
- Various national prizes in ceramic sculpture and graphic print design at official Cuban art salons.

== Major Collections ==
His work is preserved in permanent public museum collections globally, including:

- National Museum of Fine Arts of Cuba (Museo Nacional de Bellas Artes de Cuba), Havana.
- Cuban Museum of Ceramics (Museo de la Cerámica Cuba), Sala Terracota, Havana.

== Media Gallery ==
Selected art installations by José Ramón González Delgado

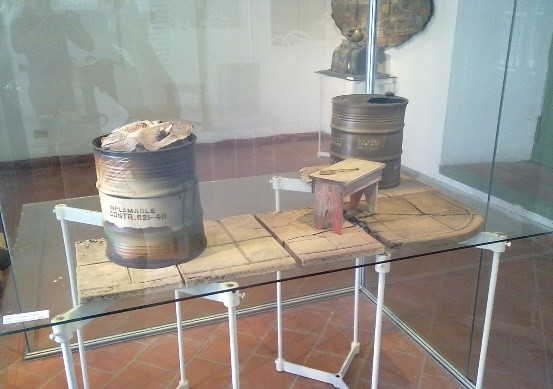
Banco de la Paciencia (2011 installation edit, Museo de la Cerámica de Cuba)

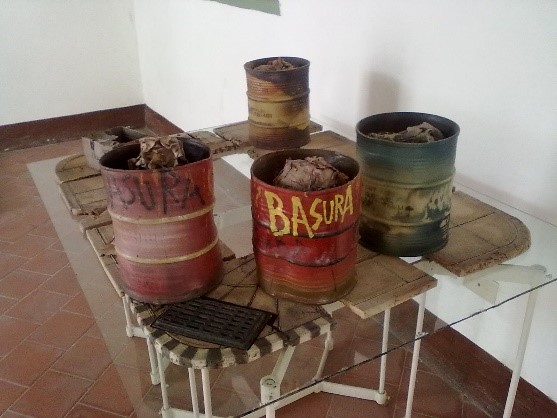
Serie:Latones de Basura (Colección del Museo de la Cerámica de Cuba, 2010)
