= Nan Chauncy =

English-Australian children's writer

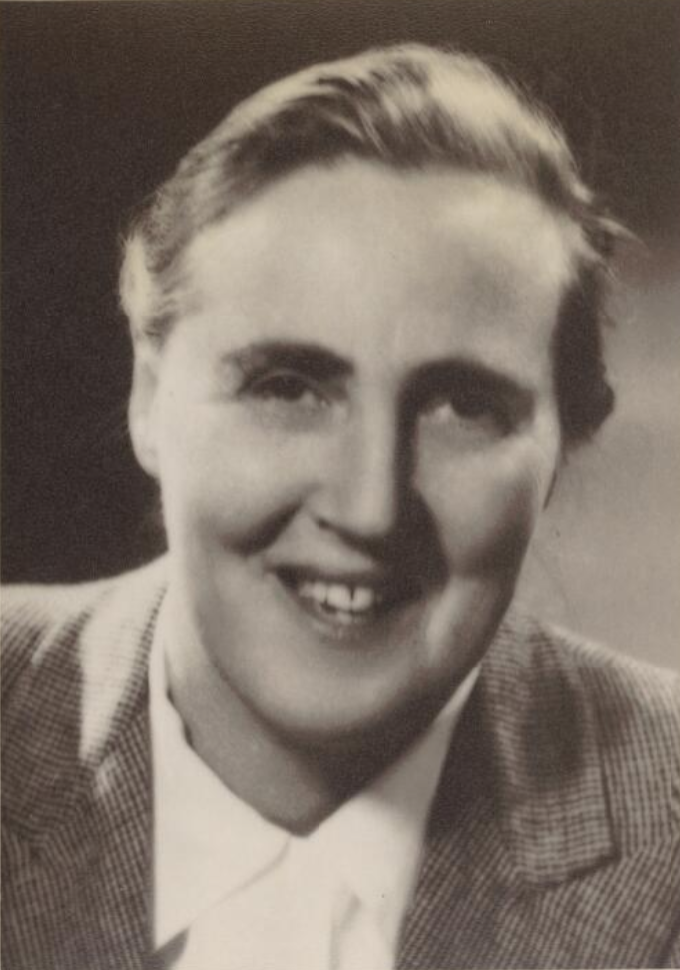
- Nan Chauncy, c.1950
- Born: Nancen Beryl Masterman; 28 May 1900; Northwood, Middlesex, England
- Died: 1 May 1970 (aged 69); Bagdad, Tasmania, Australia
- Occupation: Novelist
- Spouse: Helmut Anton Rosenfeld (1938–1970)
- Children: Heather Chauncy
- Relatives: Evelyn Masterman (sister)
- Writing career
- Period: 1948–1969
- Genre: Children's literature

Nan Chauncy (28 May 1900 – 1 May 1970) was a British-born Australian children's writer.

== Early life ==
Chauncy was born Nancen Beryl Masterman in Northwood, Middlesex (now in London), and emigrated to Tasmania, Australia, with her family in 1912, when her engineer father was offered a job with the Hobart City Council. She attended St Michael's Collegiate School in Hobart. In 1914, the family moved to the rural community of Bagdad, where they grew apple trees. The bush setting of Bagdad, including a bushranger's cave, would inspire some of her future writing, and also a lifelong involvement with the Australian Girl Guides movement. Initially organising Guide meetings and camps at her brother's Bagdad property, Chauncy started her own Guide troop in Claremont where she worked as a women's welfare officer at the Cadbury's Chocolate Factory from 1925.

== European travels ==
Chauncy returned to England in 1930, where she trained as a Girl Guide at Foxlease House in Lyndhurst, Hampshire. She also studied and practiced writing, while living on a houseboat on the River Thames. In 1934, she travelled to Sweden, Finland and the Soviet Union, and taught winter classes in English language at a Girl Guide school in Denmark.

While returning by ship to Australia in 1938, she met a German refugee named Helmut Anton Rosenfeld, and the couple married at Lara, Victoria, on 13 September. They lived in Bagdad and changed their surname to Chauncy, the name of Nan's maternal grandmother, to avoid anti-German sentiment during World War II.

== Death and legacy ==
Chauncy died of cancer at her home on 1 May 1970, aged 69. Her husband and daughter donated the family property, "Chauncy Vale", to the Brighton Council before being transferred to Southern Midlands Council for use as a nature reserve.

== Books ==
- They Found a Cave (1947)
- World's End was Home (1952)
- A Fortune for the Brave (1954)
- Tiger in the Bush (1957)
- Devil's Hill (1958)
- Tangara (1960)
- Half a World Away (1962)
- The Secret Friends (1962)
- The Roaring 40 (1963)
- High and Haunted Island (1964)
- The Skewbald Pony (1965)
- Mathinna's People (1967)
- Lizzie's Lights (1968)
- The Lighthouse Keeper's Son (1969)

Chauncy had fourteen novels published during her lifetime, twelve of which were published by Oxford University Press. Several were translated to other languages, and some were published under different titles in the USA.

== Adaptations ==
Two of Chauncy's novels have been adapted for the screen. Directed by Charles Wolnizer and featuring an all-Tasmanian cast, the 1962 feature film They Found a Cave was adapted from her novel of the same name. The film held its world premiere at the Odeon Theatre, Hobart on 20 December 1962. The film was very successful at a time when the Australian film industry was in a lull, and it won the prize for Best Children's Film at the Venice Film Festival.

In 1988, the Australian Children's Television Foundation and the Australian Broadcasting Corporation produced an anthology of television films from each of Australia's states and territories, to celebrate the Australian Bicentenary. The Tasmanian contribution was Devil's Hill, an adaptation of Chauncy's novel.

== Awards and honours ==
Chauncy won the Children's Book of the Year award three times: in 1958 for Tiger in the Bush, in 1959 for Devils' Hill, and in 1961 for Tangara. The Roaring 40 was Highly Commended in 1964, with High and Haunted Island and Mathinna's People Commended in 1965 and 1968 respectively.

She was the first Australian to win a Hans Christian Andersen Award diploma of merit.

The Children's Book Council of Australia presents the Nan Chauncy Award to recognise outstanding contribution to the field of children's literature in Australia. The award was presented every five years from 1983 to 1998, and every two years after that.
