= Elizabeth O'Conner =

Australian writer (1913–2000)

- Born: Barbara Willard Lowe; 1913; Dunedoo, New South Wales, Australia
- Died: 6 May 2000 (aged 86–87); Cairns, Queensland, Australia
- Occupation: Novelist
- Writing career
- Pen name: Anne Willard
- Period: 1958–1989
- Notable works: The Irishman; Steak for Breakfast
- Notable awards: Miles Franklin Award, 1960

Elizabeth O'Conner (1913 – 6 May 2000), born under the name Barbara Willard Lowe, was an Australian novelist. Elizabeth O'Conner was born in Dunedoo in New South Wales. After a childhood spent in Katoomba in the Blue Mountains region of New South Wales, she studied art in Adelaide and Sydney, before teaching at a Brisbane girls' boarding school.

She married Philip Birmingham McNamara, manager of a cattle station in March 1942 and moved to Queensland's Gulf Country, where she had four children. She died in Atherton, Queensland in 2000.

== Bibliography ==
=== Novels ===
- The Irishman (1960)
- Find a Woman (1963)
- The Chinee Bird (1966)
- The Winds of Fate (1977) - published under the pseudonym Anne Willard
- Spirit Man (1980)
- Darling Caroline (1980) - published under the pseudonym Anne Willard

=== Autobiography ===
- Steak for Breakfast (1958)
- A Second Helping (1969)

== Awards ==
- 1960 — winner Miles Franklin Award for The Irishman
