= John O'Grady (writer) =

Australian comic novelist (1907–1981)

- Born: John Patrick O'Grady; 9 October 1907; Waverley, New South Wales, Australia
- Died: 14 January 1981 (aged 73); Oatley, New South Wales, Australia
- Occupations: Novelist, poet
- Spouses: Lorna Maria Schreiber (m. 1930; div. 1941) Margaret (Meg) Elizabeth Lockey (m. 1941; div. 1950) Mary (Molly) Winefriede Carroll (m. 1952)
- Children: 4, including John O'Grady, Jnr
- Relatives: Frank O'Grady (brother)
- Writing career
- Pen name: Nino Culotta
- Language: English
- Genre: Satire
- Notable works: They're a Weird Mob; The Integrated Adjective

John Patrick O'Grady (9 October 1907 – 14 January 1981) was an Australian writer. His works include the comic novel They're a Weird Mob (1957) using the pen name Nino Culotta and the poem The Integrated Adjective, sometimes known as Tumba-bloody-rumba.

== Biography ==
O'Grady was born in the Sydney suburb of Waverley as the eldest of eight children to John Edward O'Grady, a Department of Lands clerk and editor of the Agricultural Gazette of New South Wales, and Margaret Gleeson, both of whom were from Victoria and of Irish descent. When he was a child his father quit his Department of Lands job and moved the family to a farm on the Peel River near Tamworth. Educated by his father until the age of twelve, his first formal schooling was at St Stanislaus' College in Bathurst, which his father had previously attended. He had originally planned to do a medical degree but drought forced his family to leave the land and made this impossible, so he wound up graduating from the University of Sydney with a degree in pharmacy. He worked as a pharmacist in Sydney and Ballina, before quitting the business in 1936 to become a medical officer in coastal passenger steamers and a travelling salesman for a pharmaceutical importer. From 1942 to 1950 he was in the Royal Australian Army Medical Corps, serving in Victoria, New South Wales, and on the hospital ship Manunda. He had another stint as a pharmacist from 1950 to 1954, before becoming a labourer and pharmacy teacher for the New Zealand government in Samoa (then Western Samoa). By this stage he had written short stories, plays, and poems, occasionally having work published in The Bulletin magazine. He completed his most famous work, They're a Weird Mob (1957), in New Zealand while waiting for the job to be organised . He died in 1981 at his home in Oatley and was cremated.

O'Grady wrote under a variety of pseudonyms, most famously as Nino Culotta for his books They're a Weird Mob, Cop This Lot, Gone Fishin ', and Gone Gougin' . Other examples include No Kava For Johnny, which is published under O'Grady's name, but contains a preface from the author claiming that the book had in fact been written by the eponymous character, Johnny.

O'Grady also wrote the television play Light Me a Lucifer. He was a regular panelist on the 1960 Sydney television advice series Teenage Mailbag.

He was married to Lorna Maria Schreiber from 1930 to 1941 (with whom he had three sons), Margaret (Meg) Elizabeth Lockey from 1941 to 1950 (with whom he had a daughter), and Mary (Molly) Winefriede Carroll from 1952 until his death. One of his sons, John O'Grady, Jnr, was at one point the head of situation comedy at the Australian Broadcasting Corporation and winner of the 1987 Television Drama Award for ABC TV series Mother and Son presented by the Australian Human Rights Commission. One of O'Grady's brothers, Frank, was also an author and published The Golden Valley (1955), Goonoo Goonoo (1956) and Hanging Rock (1957); all published by Cassell. While John O'Grady's novels were light satirical works, Frank O'Grady wrote pioneering sagas set in western New South Wales.

== Works ==
O'Grady's numerous works were originally published in hardback by Ure Smith with comic illustrations; many have frequently been re-issued by other publishing houses, generally facsimile editions in paperback.

- They're a Weird Mob (Sydney: Ure Smith, 1957) and its sequels,
  - Cop This Lot (Sydney: Ure Smith, 1960)
  - Gone Fishin' (Sydney: Ure Smith, 1962)
  - Gone Gougin' (Sydney: Ure Smith, 1975)
- No Kava for Johnny (Sydney: Ure Smith, 1961) illustrated by "WEP"
- The Things They Do To You (Sydney: Ure Smith, 1963) illustrated by "WEP"
- Aussie English: An Explanation of the Australian Idiom (Sydney: Ure Smith, 1965)
- Ladies and Gentlemen (with Douglass Baglin) (Sydney: Ure Smith, 1966)
- Gone Troppo (Sydney: Ure Smith, 1968)
- O'Grady Sez (Sydney: Ure Smith, 1969)
- So Sue Me! (Sydney: Ure Smith, 1970)
- Are You Irish or Normal? (as by Sean O'Grada) (Sydney: Ure Smith, 1970)
- Aussie Etiket; or, Doing Things the Aussie Way (Sydney: Ure Smith, 1971)
- It's Your Shout, Mate!: Aussie pubs and Aussie beers (Sydney: Ure Smith, 1972)
- Smoky Joe the Fish-eater (Sydney: Ure Smith, 1972)
- Survival in the Doghouse (Sydney: Ure Smith, 1973)
- Now Listen, Mate! [re-issue of So sue me!] (Sydney: Ure Smith, 1974)
- There Was A Kid: An Autobiography, Part One (Sydney: Ure Smith, 1977)
- Down Under To Up Over (with Molly O'Grady) (Sydney: Lansdowne Press, 1980)

Aussie Etiket was translated into Japanese as Ōsutoraria-ryū Echiketto: Oretachi Dattara Kōsuru Ne (Tōkyō : Kindai Bungeisha, 1993)

A collection of the papers of O'Grady, ranging from 1942 to 1986, are available in manuscript form at the National Library of Australia, Canberra.

== See also ==
- Australian Dream
