= Fiona McIntosh =

Australian author

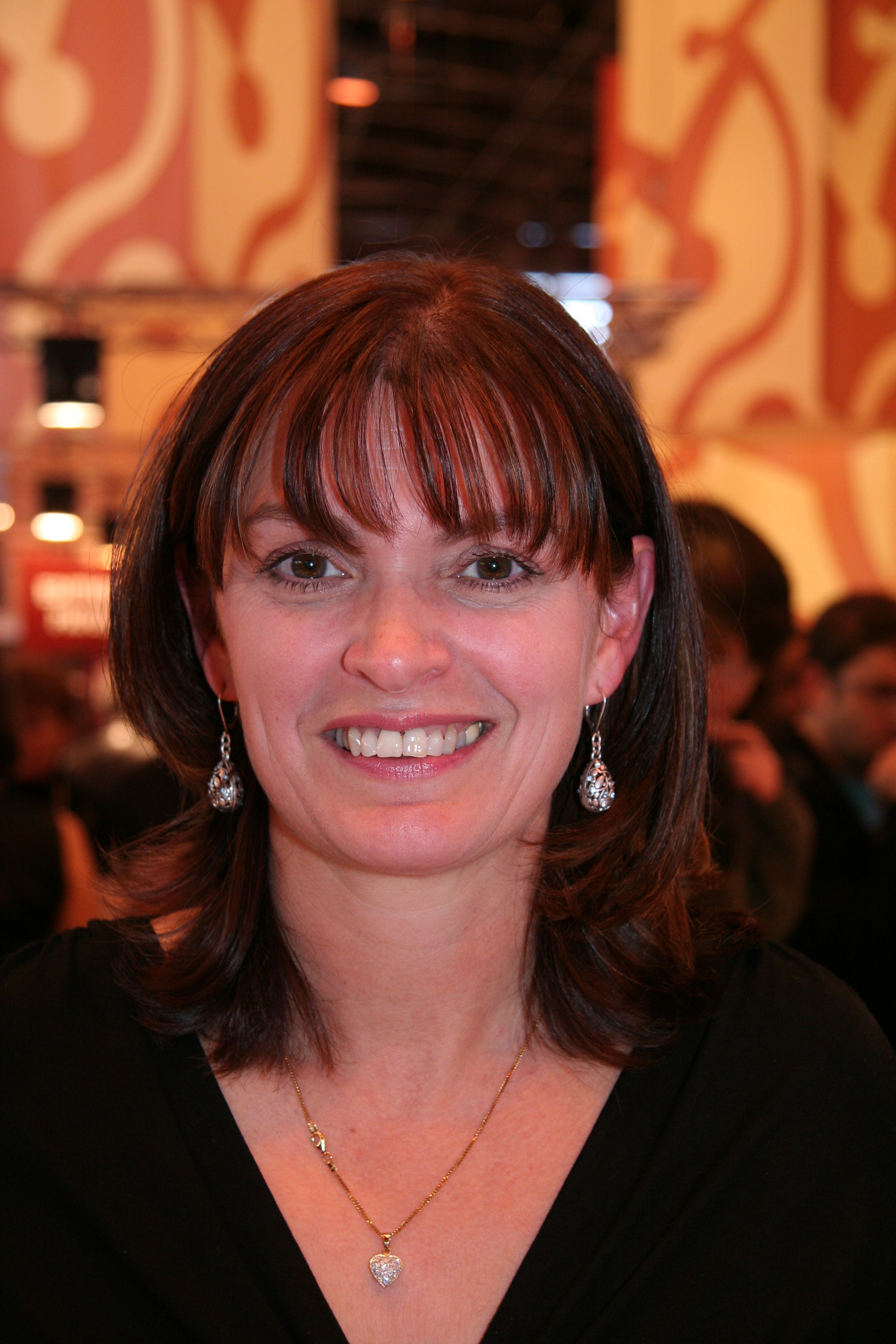
- McIntosh in 2009
- Born: 1960 (age 65–66); Brighton, England
- Occupation: Author
- Writing career
- Pen name: Lauren Crow
- Period: 2001–present
- Genres: Fantasy, crime, history
- Website: www.fionamcintosh.com

Fiona McIntosh (born 1960) is an English-born Australian author of adult and children's books. She has also written under the pen name Lauren Crow.

== Early life and education ==
Fiona McIntosh was born in Brighton, England, in 1960. As a child she spent some months in Ghana, West Africa, where her father worked for a mining company.

After studying marketing in Brighton followed by a stint in a public relations job in London, she travelled to Australia at the age of 21, where she met her future husband, Ian, in Alice Springs. They moved to Adelaide, South Australia, where they founded a monthly magazine, Travel News Australia.

McIntosh wrote as a hobby before attending a writing workshop around 2000 in Tasmania led by writer Bryce Courtenay, who encouraged and mentored her.

== Other activities ==
McIntosh founded a fantasy book club in Adelaide in the early 2000s, whose members included Sean Williams, Tony Shillitoe, Joel Shepherd, Shane Dix, Lian Hearn, and David Cornish.

She has run writing workshops and taught fantasy writing at TAFE college.

== Career ==
McIntosh writes fantasy novels for adults and children. Her first novel was Betrayal (2001), which she wrote over five weeks. It was picked up by a publisher as the first in a trilogy called Trinity.

In 2007, she published a crime novel, Bye Bye Baby, under the pen name of Lauren Crow.

In 2021 McIntosh signed a film rights deal with Monica Saunders-Weinberg, head of Hana Black Productions, to make a film of her wartime drama novel The Pearl Thief. It is being adapted by producer Bruna Papandrea.

In July 2024 she was writing her 46th book.

In 2024 Storm Publishing signed a seven-book deal with McIntosh to publish her books in the UK and the US.

== Personal life ==
McIntosh and her husband moved to live on a property in Riverton, South Australia in July 2024.

== Published works ==
=== Adult fiction ===
==== Trinity ====
- Betrayal (2001)
- Revenge (2002)
- Destiny (2002)

==== The Quickening ====
- Myrren's Gift (2003)
- Blood and Memory (2004)
- Bridge of Souls (2004)

==== Percheron ====
- Odalisque (2005)
- Emissary (2006)
- Goddess (2007)

==== Valisar ====
- Royal Exile (2008)
- Tyrant's Blood (2009)
- King's Wrath (2010)

==== Jack Hawksworth series ====
- Bye Bye Baby (2007, writing under the pen-name Lauren Crow)
- Beautiful Death (2009)
- Mirror Man (2021)
- Dead Tide (2023)
- Foul Play (2024)
- Blood Pact (2025)

==== Other novels ====
- Fields of Gold (2010)
- The Lavender Keeper (2012)
- The Scrivener's Tale (2012, standalone novel set in the world of The Quickening)
- The French Promise (2013, sequel to The Lavender Keeper)
- The Tailor's Girl (2013)
- Tapestry (2014)
- Nightingale (2014)
- The Last Dance (2015)
- On The Scent of Purfume: The Making of the Perfumer's Secret (2015)
- The Perfumer's Secret (2015)
- The Chocolate Tin (2016)
- The Tea Gardens (2017)
- The Pearl Thief (2018)
- The Diamond Hunter (2019)
- The Champagne War (2020)
- The Spy's Wife (2021)
- The Orphans (2022)
- The Sugar Palace (2023)
- The Fallen Woman (2024)
- The Soldier's Daughter (2025, sequel to The Champagne War)

=== Short stories ===
- The Bathhouse Girl (2009) in Thanks for the Mammaries (ed. Sarah Darmody)

=== Children's fiction ===
==== Shapeshifter ====
- Severo's Intent (2007)
- Saxten's Secret (2007)
- Wolf Lair (2007)
- King of the Beasts (2007)

==== Other works ====
- The Whisperer (2009)
- The Rumpelgeist (2012)
- Harry and Gran Bake a Cake (2025) with Sara Acton

=== Non fiction ===
- How To Write Your Blockbuster (2015)
