= 1942 in poetry =

Nationality words link to articles with information on the nation's poetry or literature (for instance, Irish or France).

== Events ==
- March 1 – Marianne Lorraine appears with John Serry Sr. at The Town Hall (New York City) in a performance of poetry by Carl Sandburg and Archibald MacLeish as presented by the Free World Association and sponsored by Eleanor Roosevelt.
- March 28 – Spanish poet Miguel Hernández dies of tuberculosis as a political prisoner in a prison hospital having scrawled his last verse on the wall.
- April 3 – French poet Paul Éluard (Eugène Paul Grindel)'s poem "Liberté" is first published in the collection Poésie et vérité ("Poetry and truth") in Paris. In June it is reprinted by the magazine Fontaine, titled "Une seule pensée", to reach Vichy France. It is published by Éditions de Minuit and printed in London by the official Gaullist magazine La France libre. Thousands of copies are parachuted into Occupied France by aircraft of the British Royal Air Force.
- October – English poet Keith Douglas takes part in the Second Battle of El Alamein (against orders).
- December – BIM magazine founded in Barbados.
- American poet George Oppen forces his induction into the U.S. Army.
- Preview, a small literary magazine, is founded in Canada (merged with First Statement in 1945 to form Northern Review, which lasts until 1956); it is published by F. R. Scott, A. J. M. Smith, A. M. Klein and P. K. Page, led by English-born poet and travel writer Patrick Anderson.
- First Statement, a mimeographed, small literary magazine, is founded in Canada (merged with Preview in 1945); it is published by John Sutherland; Irving Layton and Louis Dudek are also involved.
- French poet André Breton delivers a lecture entitled "Situation du surealisme entre les deux guerres" at Yale University.

== Works published ==
Listed by the nation where the work was first published and again by the poet's native land, if different; substantially revised works listed separately:

=== Canada ===
- Earle Birney, David and Other Poems, the title piece, David, a long, narrative poem, was one of the most frequently taught poems in Canadian schools for decades Governor General's Award, 1942.
- Arthur Bourinot, Canada at Dieppe.
- Ralph Gustafson ed., Anthology of Canadian Poetry, including work by F. R. Scott, A. M. Klein, A. J. M. Smith, Leo Kennedy, E. J. Pratt, Finch, Dorothy Livesay, P. K. Page and Earle Birney; Penguin
- Anne Marriott, Salt Marsh, Toronto: Ryerson Press.

=== India, in English ===
- Sri Aurobindo, Collected Poems and Plays (Poetry & Plays in English), in two volumes, Pondicherry: Sri Aurobindo Ashram
- Raul De Loyola Furtado, also known as Joseph Furtado, Selected Poems (Poetry in English), Bombay: published by the author in a limited edition of 100 copies (second edition, revised 1947; third edition, revised 1967)
- P. R. Kaikini, The Snake in the Moon (Poetry in English), Bombay: New Book Co.
- Poetry in War Time (Poetry in English), London: Faber and Faber; anthology; Indian poetry, published in the United Kingdom
- Manjeri Sundaraman, Penumbra

=== United Kingdom and Ireland ===
- Walter de la Mare, Collected Poems
- Morwenna Donnelly, Beauty and Ashes
- T. S. Eliot, Little Gidding, long poem, last of his Four Quartets, published in The New English Weekly September
- Roy Fuller, The Middle of a War
- W. S. Graham, Cage Without Grievance
- John Heath-Stubbs, Wounded Thammuz
- J. F. Hendry, The Bombed Happiness
- Agnes Grozier Herbertson, This is the Hour: Poems
- Patrick Kavanagh, The Great Hunger
- Sidney Keyes, The Iron Laurel
- Alun Lewis, Raiders' Dawn, and Other Poems, on a soldier's life in the World War II
- Robert Nichols, Such Was My Singing
- Leslie Norris, Tongue of Beauty
- William Plomer, In a Bombed House, 1941: Elegy in Memory of Anthony Butts
- Poetry in Wartime: An Anthology, edited by Tambimuttu, London: Faber and Faber
- John Pudney, Dispersal Point, and Other Air Poems, including "For Johnny"
- Henry Reed, "Naming of Parts", part 1 of his "Lessons of the War" sequence, published in the New Statesman August 8
- Stevie Smith, Mother, What is Man?
- Stephen Spender, Ruins and Visions
- Dorothy Wellesley, Lost Planet, and Other Poems

=== United States ===
- Conrad Aiken, Brownstone Eclogues
- Stephen Vincent Benét, They Burned the Books
- John Berryman, Poems
- R. P. Blackmur, The Second World
- John Malcolm Brinnin:
  - The Garden Is Political
  - The Lincoln Lyrics
- Malcolm Cowley, A Dry Season
- Robert Frost, A Witness Tree
- Langston Hughes, Shakespeare in Harlem
- Randall Jarrell, Blood for a Stranger
- Edna St. Vincent Millay, The Murder of Lidice
- Kenneth Patchen, The Teeth of the Lion
- Muriel Rukeyser, Wake Island
- Karl Shapiro:
  - Person, Place and Thing
  - The Place of Love
- Wallace Stevens:
  - Parts of a World, includes "The Poems of Our Climate," "The Well Dressed Man with a Beard," and "Examination of the Hero in a Time of War", Knopf
  - Notes Toward a Supreme Fiction, Cummington Press
- Mark Van Doren, Our Lady Peace
- Margaret Walker, For My People
- Robert Penn Warren, Eleven Poems on the Same Theme
- Edmund Wilson, Notebooks of Night

=== Other in English ===
- Louise Bennett, Dialect Verses, Caribbean

== Works published in other languages ==
Listed by the nation where the work was first published and again by the poet's native land, if different; substantially revised works listed separately:

=== France ===
- Louis Aragon, Les Yeux d'Elsa
- René-Guy Cadou:
  - Bruits du coeur
  - Lilas du soir
- Paul Claudel, Cent phrases pour éventails
- Robert Desnos, Fortunes
- Paul Éluard, pen name of Paul-Eugène Grindel:
  - Le livre ouvert
  - Poésie et Vérité
- Pierre Emmanuel, pen name of Noël Mathieu,
  - Cantos
  - Jour de colère
- Léon-Paul Fargue, Refuges
- Jean Follain, Canisy
- Eugène Guillevic, Terraqué
- Loys Masson, Déliverez-nous du mal, war poems
- Alphonse Métérié, Prix Lasserre
- Henri Michaux, Au pays de la magie
- Saint-John Perse, pen name of Alexis Saint-Léger Léger, Exil
- Francis Ponge, Le parti pris des choses, 32 short to medium-length prose poems
- Raymond Queneau, Pierrot mon ami
- Jean Tortel, De mon vivant

=== Indian subcontinent ===
Including all of the British colonies that later became India, Pakistan, Bangladesh, Sri Lanka and Nepal. Listed alphabetically by first name, regardless of surname:

==== Bengali ====
- Birendra Chattopadhyay, Grahacyta
- Dinesh Das, Kabita 1343–48
- Jibanananda Das, Banalata Sen

==== Other Indian languages ====
- Akhtar Ansari Akbarabadi, Abgine, Urdu
- Hari Daryani, Koda, Sindhi-language (India)
- K. S. Narasimha Swami, Mysuru Malige, Indian, Kannada-language, called "the most famous collection of love poems in Kannada"
- N. Gopla Pillai, Sita-Vicara-Lahari, translation into Sanskrit from the Malayalam of Kumaran Asan's poem Cintavistayaya Sita
- Pritam Singh Safir, Pap de Sohle, Indian, Punjabi-language
- Sumitra Kumari Sinha, ' 'Asa Parva' ', Hindi-language (India)

=== Other languages ===
- Chairil Anwar, "Nisan" ("Grave"), Indonesian
- D. Gwenallt Jones, Cnoi Cil, Welsh poet published in the United Kingdom
- Erik Lindegren, Manen utan väg ("The Man Without a Way"), Sweden
- César Moro, pen name of César Quíspez Asín, La tortuga ecuestre, Peru
- Pier Paolo Pasolini, Versi a Casarsa, Friulian language published in Italy
- Cesare Pavese, Lavorare stanca ("Hard Work"), expanded version nearly double the size of the first edition published in 1936; Italy
- Saint-John Perse, Exil: poème, Marseilles: Editions Cahiers du Sud; France
- Francis Ponge, Le parti pris des choses, Gallimard; France
- Stella Sierra, Sinfonía jubilosa en doce sonetos ("Joyful Symphony in Twelve Sonnets"), Panama
- Hannah Szenes, "A Walk to Caesarea", Modern Hebrew poetry

== Awards and honors ==
- Governor General's Award, poetry or drama: David and Other Poems, Earle Birney (Canada)

=== United States ===
- Robert Frost Medal: Edgar Lee Masters
- Pulitzer Prize for Poetry: William Rose Benét, The Dust Which Is God

== Births ==
Death years link to the corresponding "[year] in poetry" article:

- January 17 – Muhammad Ali (born Cassius Clay), African-American heavyweight boxer and occasional poet (died 2016)
- January 19 – Pat Mora, female Mexican-American author and poet
- February 14 – Rafiq Azad, Bengali poet, editor and academic (died 2016)
- February 20 – Hugo Williams, English poet, journalist and travel writer
- February 22 – Peter Abbs, English poet and academic (died 2020)
- February 23 – Haki R. Madhubuti (born Don Luther Lee), African-American poet, author and academic
- March 13 – Mahmoud Darwish, Palestinian poet and prose writer
- March 26 – Erica Jong, American author and poet
- April 10 – Stuart Dybek, American poet and author
- April 27 – Sadakazu Fujii 藤井 貞和, Japanese poet and literary scholar (surname: Fujii)
- May 22 – Souad al-Sabah, Kuwaiti poet and writer
- June 7 – Aonghas MacNeacail, Scottish Gaelic poet (died 2022)
- June 21 – Henry S. Taylor, Pulitzer Prize-winning American poet
- August 25 – Pat Ingoldsby, Irish poet and television presenter
- September 19 – David Henderson, American poet associated with the Umbra workshop and Black Arts Movement
- October 5 – Nick Piombino, American poet, essayist and psychotherapist, sometimes associated with Language poets because of his frequent appearance in the seminal L=A=N=G=U=A=G=E magazine early in his poetic career
- October 11 – William Corbett, American poet, essayist, editor, educator and publisher (died 2018)
- October 23 – Douglas Dunn, Scottish poet, academic and critic
- November 9 – Karin Kiwus, German poet
- November 11 – William Matthews, American poet and essayist
- November 19 – Sharon Olds, American poet
- November 27 – Marilyn Hacker, American poet, critic and reviewer
- November 28 – Eiléan Ní Chuilleanáin, Irish poet
- December 9 – David Harsent, English poet and crime novelist
- December 16
  - Arthur Nortje, South African poet (died 1970)
  - Peter Seaton, American associated with the Language poets
- Also:
  - Gladys Cardiff, American poet and academic
  - Pat Ingoldsby, Irish television presenter and poet
  - Peter Klappert, American poet
  - Sydney Lea, American poet
  - Charles Martin, American poet, critic and translator
  - Macdara Woods, Irish poet (died 2018)

== Deaths ==
Birth years link to the corresponding "[year] in poetry" article:

- January 4 – Joan Vincent Murray (born 1917), English-born Canadian American poet
- February 2 – Daniil Kharms (born 1905), early Soviet-era surrealist and absurdist poet, writer, dramatist and founder of Oberiu poetry school, probably of starvation in his Leningrad prison asylum cell
- February 15 – Marie Heiberg (born 1890), Estonian poet, insane
- March 26 – Carolyn Wells (born 1862), American novelist and poet
- March 28 – Miguel Hernández (born 1910), Spanish poet, from tuberculosis in harsh conditions during imprisonment
- April 19 – José María Eguren (born 1874), Peruvian symbolism poet
- April 24 – Lucy Maud Montgomery, known as "L. M. Montgomery" (born 1874), Canadian poet and author best known for a series of novels beginning with Anne of Green Gables
- c. Early May – Jakob van Hoddis (born 1887), German-Jewish Expressionist poet, in Sobibór extermination camp
- May 7 – William Baylebridge, pseudonym of Charles William Blocksidge (born 1883), Australian poet and short story writer
- May 11 – Sakutarō Hagiwara 萩原 朔太郎 (born 1886), Taishō and early Shōwa period Japanese literary critic and free-verse poet called the "father of modern colloquial poetry in Japan" (surname: Hagiwara)
- May 12 – Shaw Neilson (born 1872), Australian poet
- May 26 – Libero Bovio (born 1883), Italian poet in the Neapolitan dialect
- May 29 – Akiko Yosano 与謝野 晶子 pen name of Yosano Shiyo (born 1878), late Meiji period, Taishō period and early Shōwa period Japanese poet, pioneering feminist, pacifist and social reformer; one of the most famous, and most controversial, post-classical woman poets of Japan (surname: Yosano)
- July 23 – Nikola Vaptsarov Никола Йонков Вапцаров (born 1909), Bulgarian poet and resistance worker, executed
- September 3/4 – Annie Wall Barnett (born 1859), American poet, writer, litterateur
- September 12 – Patrick R. Chalmers (born 1872), Irish writer on field sports and poet
- October 29 – Màrius Torres (born 1910), Catalan Spanish poet, from tuberculosis
- November 2 – Hakushū Kitahara 北原 白秋, pen name of Kitahara Ryūkichi 北原 隆吉 (born 1885), Taishō and Shōwa period Japanese tanka poet (surname: Kitahara)
- November 4 – Clementine Krämer (born 1873), German poet and short-story writer, in Theresienstadt concentration camp
- December 23 – Konstantin Balmont (born 1867), Russian Symbolist poet, in Paris

== See also ==
- Poetry
- List of poetry awards
- List of years in poetry
