= Montreal Group =

The Montreal Group, sometimes referred to as the McGill Group or McGill Movement, was a circle of Canadian modernist writers formed in the mid-1920s at McGill University in Montreal, Quebec. The Group included Leon Edel, John Glassco, A. M. Klein, Leo Kennedy, F. R. Scott, and A. J. M. Smith, most of whom attended McGill as undergraduates. The group championed the theory and practice of modernist poetry over the Victorian-style versification, exemplified by the Confederation Poets, that predominated in Canadian poetry at the time.

The Montreal Group is associated with the rise of the "little magazines", which published contemporary innovative prose and poetry in the style of British and American modernism, and later works from Europe's aesthetic and decadent movements. The Encyclopædia Britannica credits the group and its members with having "precipitated a renaissance of Canadian poetry during the 1920s and ’30s ... They encouraged an emulation of the realistic themes, metaphysical complexity, and techniques of the U.S. and British poets Ezra Pound, T.S. Eliot, and W.H. Auden that resulted in an Expressionist, Modernist, and often Imagist poetry reflective of the values of an urban and cosmopolitan civilization."

== History ==
In the 1920s, most Canadian poetry was similar to that of English poets of the Victorian era. This style had been popularized around the time of Confederation by Charles G. D. Roberts, Bliss Carman, Archibald Lampman and Duncan Campbell Scott, and continued to prevail among Canadian poets until the early 1940s. Some Canadians, though, were writing modernist poetry: W. W. E. Ross, R. G. Everson, Raymond Knister, and Dorothy Livesay were each individually publishing Imagist poetry in free verse in American and English literary publications.

Over time these poets became known as the Montreal Group. They founded a number of "little magazines" which gave Canadian modernists the opportunity to publish in their own country. As Louis Dudek and Michael Gnarowski were to write four decades later, in The Making of Modern Poetry in Canada (1967):

The little magazine in Canada has been the most important single factor behind the rise and continued progress of modernism in Canadian poetry. The history of the little magazine covers a period of some forty years and closely parallels the development of modern poetry itself from the mid-1920s to the present time. All the important events in poetry and most of the initiating manifestoes and examples of change are to be found in the little magazines."

=== McGill Daily Literary Supplement ===
This first publication began as a weekly supplement to the McGill Daily, the university undergraduate society's newspaper, and was edited by Allan Latham, A. P. R. Coulborn, and A. J. M. Smith. It included poems, articles, and book reviews.

When Scott submitted a translation of "an old French chanson", Smith printed it, and subsequently invited Scott to serve on the editorial board. The Literary Supplement contained no advertising, and after a time the students' society stopped funding it; Smith and Scott closed the Supplement and began work on an independent publication to replace it.

=== McGill Fortnightly Review ===
On November 21, 1925 the McGill Fortnightly Review published its first issue and branded itself and "independent journal devoted to purely literary, artistic and scientific matter." The editorial board was A. P. R. Coulborn, A. B. Latham, F. R. Scott, A. J. M and managing editor Leon Edel; the manager was Montreal businessman Lou Schwartz. The journal was one of the first to publish modernist poetry and critical opinion in Canada, and was considered as rebellious in tone. The journal published the work of Leo Kennedy; A. M. Klein's one submission was turn down because it included the word "soul", which the editors considered old-fashioned.

The name came from that bastion of Victorian tradition, the Fortnightly Review; and the first issue praised a talk Bliss Carman had given at McGill. By Vol. 2, No. 1, in which Smith offered readers an analysis of The Waste Land, the new biweekly was focused directly on the introduction of Modernism into Canadian poetry.

The publication regularly criticized the Canadian Authors' Association, which the editors saw as promoting the "quasi-Victorian" verse of the times. For example, the journal's second issue derided the CAA's promotion of a Canadian "Book Week", arguing that the association should focus on the development of excellence in Canadian literature rather than the promotion of existing books regardless of quality. F. R. Scott's satirical poem "The Canadian Authors Meet", which claimed that the association encouraged amateurism, appeared in the last issue of the journal in 1927.

The McGill Fortnightly Review published many articles and editorials about Modernism, a well as a variety of modernistic poetry. In his editorials, Smith argued that Canadian poets must go beyond the traditional poetry of Bliss Carman, Archibald Lampman, Duncan Campbell Scott, and Charles G. D. Roberts, and open themselves to contemporary forms, such as free verse, imagistic treatment, displacement, and complex poetic structure. He also urged writers to dispense with the "Victorian mannerisms" which were in common use at the time.

American journalist H. L. Mencken was a major influence on the Group's prose style. Publisher Louis Schwartz, contributed an article to The McGill Fortnightly Review in which he calls Mencken "the creator of a new sort of writing ... Americanese of a racy bumptiousness so vivacious and interesting that he is eagerly followed by a large number of people. ... Mencken is essentially a young man's critic, violent and destructive."

The MFR provided a space for modernists to ply their craft, to learn from and teach each other. Years later, Edel wrote that "The McGill Fortnightly drew to it other young writers – among them A. M. Klein, Leo Kennedy, and Leon Edel – on whom, as well as on Scott, Smith had an enduring influence." The writers who contributed to the publication gained editorial experience and direction, and eventually formed a new literary movement, the McGill group, consisting originally of Scott, Smith and Leo Kennedy.

=== Canadian Mercury ===
Founded in 1928, short-lived The Canadian Mercury was the first independent periodical produced by the Montreal Group. Its editorial board consisted of Jean Burton, F. R. Scott, Leo Kennedy and Felix Walter." Publication was financed by Louis Schwartz, and the resulting financial security left the board free to pursue its literary agenda.

Smith and Edel, doing graduate work in Edinburgh and Paris respectively, continued to contribute by mail. Unlike the McGill-affiliated publications, the Mercury solicited contributions from a wider group of Canadian writers, and was targeted to readers beyond the Montreal area. The first issue, published in December 1928, featured an essay on "The National Literature Problem in Canada" by Canadian institution Stephen Leacock.

The editors continued their campaign to publish contemporary poetry and literary criticism to counter the prevailing Romantic tradition in Canada. The Canadian Mercury 's contributors represented a transitional style, as the beginnings of Canadian modernist poetry began to emerge.

The Mercury continued the modernist program begun in the Review. Attacks on the CAA continued, such as Leo Kennedy's polemic, "The Future of Canadian Literature," in which he accused the Association of promoting "archaic transplanted Victorianisms. He urged young writers to look instead to the examples of Joyce, Hemingway, Shaw, Pound and Aldous Huxley in creating the future of Canadian literature.

In the Mercury's final issue, Scott reviewed Bliss Carman's new book, Wild Garden (published posthumously; Carmen had died earlier in 1929), finding not one decent poem in the book.

The Canadian Mercury folded in the wake of the economic Crash of 1929.

=== The McGilliad ===
This little-known successor McGill publication was founded in 1930 and ran until 1931. It was edited first by co-founder Klein, and then by Klein's friend, co-founder David Lewis (who would later lead Canada's socialist New Democratic Party). The publication's name was an obvious pun on the classic epic The Iliad – privately, Klein called it the "McGill Yid" (a pun on his and Lewis's Yiddish heritage).

Under Klein's editorship the McGilliad carried the first published poem by then high school student Irving Layton.

Under Lewis the magazine became more political: It published editorials about his anti-communist views, though the December 1930 issue included his article expressing approval of the Russian Revolution and calling for a greater understanding of the Soviet Union.

=== New Provinces ===
In the late 1920s, several of the group's core members left Montreal: Smith, Glassco, Edel, and Kennedy; however, four of the poets (Smith, Kennedy, Klein, and Scott) came together in 1931 to begin the creation of an anthology, New Provinces: Poems by Several Authors. In 1934 they invited Toronto poets E. J. Pratt and Robert Finch to participate. The result, published in May 1936, was an anthology which epitomized modernist poetry in Canada."

For a Preface, Smith wrote a modernist manifesto that declared Canadian poetry to be dead. The Preface was not used. (It was incorporated into the reprinted edition in 1976.) Leon Edel later declared, "The poems in New provinces had an impact on Canadian verse far beyond any prefatorial pronouncements: in its implicit call for new findings and new attitudes in Canadian writing, it might be likened to the effect of the Wordsworth-Coleridge Lyrical ballads in 1798 on the Romantics.... The effect of New provinces was that it established the ‘Montreal Group’ as the Canadian avant-garde of its time."

=== Preview ===
The Montreal literary magazine Preview was founded by F. R. Scott and Montreal poet Patrick Anderson in March 1942; A. M. Klein and P. K. Page also became part of the editorial group.

Preview continued the cosmopolitan editorial policies of the McGill Fortnightly Review Its contributors showed the influence of the English poets of the 1930s."

In 1942, another Montreal literary magazine, First Statement was founded by Montreal poet John Sutherland, after Preview had rejected some of his poetry. In his magazine he criticized the Montreal Group as "too exclusive in their demand for cosmopolitan sophistication, too ready to denounce the provincial in favour of anything new from far away." By this time, the Montreal Group had achieved its purposes of creating acceptance in Canada for the tenets of modernism, of encouraging Canadian poets to include elements of modernism in their work, and of developing venues for those who did so to publish their work. Many poets contributed to both Preview and First Statement; by 1945, when the two magazines merged to become Northern Review, the Group was no longer actively promoting modernism.

== Principles ==
The McGill Group came together with the aim of modernizing Canadian poetry, by encouraging the inclusion of imagism and symbolism, which were already being used by poets from outside Canada, including William Butler Yeats, T. S. Eliot, H.D., Wallace Stevens, E. E. cummings and Marianne Moore. They promoted the responsibility of the poet to comment on Canadian society through realistic expression, wit and irony, rather than just lyrical descriptive passages.

=== Cosmopolitanism ===
The Smith group drew its models and its teachings from world literature. Like the Confederation Poets, the members of the Montreal Group were cosmopolitans. Although members of the Group sometimes criticized the "Maple Leaf school" of poets for being wholly dependent on an imported tradition, some detractors pointed out that they themselves usually found their influences outside Canada.

=== Symbolism ===
Smith, in a bid to set the tone for a new type of poetry, wrote about symbolism in the second issue of MFR. His essay, "Symbolism in Poetry," argued for the need for symbolism in modern poetry, and explaining the theory and history of its use. Smith quotes Yeats, who describes the use of symbolism as 'a casting out of descriptions of nature for the sake of nature, of the moral law for the sake of the moral law, a casting out of all anecdotes and of that brooding over scientific opinion ... and of that vehemence that would make us do or not do certain things.'

=== Imagism ===
The Imagism espoused by the Montreal modernists was no different from the Imagists they took them from. In his Rejected Preface to New Provinces, Smith's discussion about the poets' attempt to "get rid of the facile word, the stereotyped phrase and the mechanical rhythm ..." and "to combine colloquialism and rhetoric. ..." was built on ideas from F. S. Flint's 1913 manifesto. Smith went on to give a definition of imagism: "The imagist seeks with perfect objectivity and impersonality to recreate a thing or arrest an experience as precisely and vividly and simply as possible."

Smith wrote a number of "Imagist poems" to illustrate the theory, the best known of which is "The Lonely Land". Some later critics noted that these poems didn't incorporate imagism as expressed by Pound and Hulme, but instead adapted imagist ideas in new ways, combining the imported practices to Canadian culture and environment.

=== Determinism ===
In Volume II No. 4 of the MFR, Smith wrote an article arguing "that the new poetry 'must be the result of the impingement of modern conditions upon the personality and temperament of the poet' ... whatever the poet's response to modern civilization, Smith rightly saw 'the peculiar conditions of the time [as having] forced them all to seek a new and more direct expression, to perfect a finer technique.' Smith saw the experimentation in the forms of the arts that was so prevalent in the 1910s and 1920s not as something that stemmed out of a conscious choice on the part of writers, but as a condition 'forced' upon them."

=== Anti-Canadianism ===
The Montreal Group's publications rarely had anything favourable to say about the work of Canadian writers outside of their own group, and the editors often declined to read or review it. Leo Kennedy told biographer Patricia Morley in the 1970s: "We despised them unbeknownst, and you can quote me." Or as Scott later put it, "it was all through us. There was the general feeling that practically all poetry – particularly Canadian poetry – was hardly worth looking at, that something new had to be found, new methods of expression." Other modernist Canadian writers, though sometimes published in the group's magazines, were never saluted or even acknowledged in its editorials. It was not until the 1940s that Smith, who at the time described Canadian literary works as backward when compared to international poetry, repudiated his stance, which he blamed on youthful ignorance. He acknowledged the work of some of his Canadian contemporaries, including W. W. E. Ross and Dorothy Livesay, and also admitted that "Lampman, Roberts and Carman had written some very fine poetry."

== Legacy ==
By the mid-1920s modernism was already firmly entrenched in both British and American literature, and would eventually have come to Canada one way or another with or without the Montreal Group. Still, the members of the Group were among the first Canadian writers to embrace its tenets, worked hard to facilitate its acceptance among Canadian writers, and went on to become well-recognized as 20th century modernist poets. Members of the group have gone on to win a Pulitzer Prize (Edel), five Governor General's Awards (Scott [2], Glassco, Klein, and Smith), three Lorne Pierce Medals (Klein, Scott, and Smith), and a National Book Award (Edel).

According to the Encyclopedia of Literature in Canada, "the McGill group changed the standard for writing poetry in Canada, and its sense of the function of the poet and the demands of poetic craft continued to influence the writing of poetry in Canada until the end of the 20th century."
