= First Statement =

Canadian literary magazine

First Statement was a Canadian literary magazine published in Montreal, Quebec from 1942 to 1945. During its short life the magazine, along with its rival publication Preview with which it often shared contributors, provided one of the few publication avenues for modernist Canadian poetry at a time when Canadian literature tended to be dominated by a more conservative aesthetic. John Sutherland and his sister Betty Sutherland (both half-siblings of the actor Donald Sutherland) established First Statement after a group of John Sutherland's poems was rejected by Preview, edited by Patrick Anderson.

What began as a mimeographed publication of a few stapled sheets grew within three years into a larger magazine of tentatively national significance (it had editorial representatives in Vancouver although its core circulation was small—about 75 copies per issue). A year into its history, Canadian poets Louis Dudek and Irving Layton joined the magazines editorial board; both would go on to become major figures in Canadian literature. The so-called First Statement Group aligned itself with the cosmopolitan aesthetic in Canadian poetry, drawing inspiration from such avant-garde American poets as Ezra Pound and William Carlos Williams. This placed the editorial policy of First Statement somewhat in opposition with that of Preview, which tended to favour such British anti-modernists as W. H. Auden and Dylan Thomas. Despite these differences, the rivalry between the two magazines was never strong, and A. M. Klein, F. R. Scott, and other important poets published in both periodicals.

In 1943, Sutherland published a review of Anderson's poetry in First Statement which suggested homoerotic themes in Anderson's writing, and accusing Anderson of "some sexual experience of a kind not normal"; although Anderson would in fact come out as gay later in life, he was married at the time to Peggy Doernbach, and threatened to sue. Sutherland printed a retraction in the following issue. The incident was little known outside of Montreal at the time, as both magazines had small, primarily local circulations, although it would come to be more extensively analyzed in the 1990s as an important incident in the history of LGBT literature in Canada.

In 1945 Sutherland, by now the major figurehead at First Statement, established First Statement Press, which outlived the magazine itself until well into the 1950s. Significant books published by First Statement Press included Other Canadians: An Anthology of New Poetry in Canada, 1940-46, Canada's first anthology to feature modernist poetry exclusively (after F.R Scott and A.J.M. Smith published New Provinces in 1936); Layton's first two monographs, Here and Now (1945) and Now is the Place (1948); Anderson's A Tent for April and Miriam Waddington's Green World (both 1945), along with collections by Raymond Souster and Anne Wilkinson.

In 1945 First Statement merged with Preview to become Northern Review, a larger and more widely distributed publication that lasted until its managing editor Sutherland's death from cancer in 1956. Today, all of these publications continue to be recognized as some of the important little magazines in Canadian literary history and as important forerunners of later critical and literary journals in Canada, such as Canadian Literature, the Tamarack Review, and The Fiddlehead.
