= P. K. Page =

Canadian poet (1916–2010)

- Born: Patricia Kathleen Page; 23 November 1916; Swanage, Dorset, England
- Died: 14 January 2010 (aged 93); Oak Bay, British Columbia, Canada
- Spouse: William Arthur Irwin (m. 1950; died 1999)
- Children: 3
- Writing career
- Pen name: P.K. Page (as poet), Judith Cape (as novelist), P.K. Irwin (as a painter)
- Notable works: The Metal and the Flower
- Notable awards: Governor General's Award in Visual and Media Arts, Order of Canada, FRSC

Patricia Kathleen Page, CC OBC FRSC (23 November 1916 – 14 January 2010) was a Canadian poet, though the citation as she was inducted as a Fellow of the Royal Society of Canada reads "poet, novelist, script writer, playwright, essayist, journalist, librettist, teacher and artist." She was the author of more than 30 published books that include poetry, fiction, travel diaries, essays, children's books, and an autobiography.

As a visual artist, she exhibited her work as P.K. Irwin at a number of venues in Canada and abroad. Her works are in the permanent collections of the National Gallery of Canada, the Art Gallery of Ontario and the Burnaby Art Gallery.

By special resolution of the United Nations, in 2001 Page's poem "Planet Earth" was read simultaneously in New York, the Antarctic, and the South Pacific to celebrate the International Year of Dialogue Among Civilizations.

== Life ==
P.K. Page was born in Swanage, Dorset, England, and moved with her family to Canada in 1919. Page's parents moved with her to Red Deer, Alberta in 1919, when she was only 3, and later to Calgary and Winnipeg. Her father was Lionel Frank Page, a Canadian Army officer. Page said her parents were creative, encouraging non-conformists who loved the arts, recited poetry and read to her. She credited her early interest in poetry to the rhythms she unconsciously imbibed as a child. A year in England when she was 17 opened her eyes to galleries, ballets and concerts.

Page "later moved to Saint John, New Brunswick, where she worked as a shop assistant and radio actress during the late 1930s." In 1941, she moved to Montreal and came into contact with the Montreal Group of poets, which included A. M. Klein and F. R. Scott.

She became a founding member of Patrick Anderson's Preview magazine in 1942, and of its successor, Northern Review, in 1945. Some of her poetry appeared in the modernist anthology, Unit of Five, in 1944, along with poems by Louis Dudek, Ronald Hambleton, Raymond Souster, and James Wreford.

In 1944, she published a romantic novel, The Sun and the Moon, under the pseudonym Judith Cape. The novel was reprinted in 1973, along with some of her short stories from the 1940s, as The Sun and the Moon and Other Fictions.

Later she became a scriptwriter at Canada's National Film Board, where she met W. Arthur Irwin, a former editor of Maclean's magazine, whom she married in 1950. Following her marriage, "Page devoted her time to writing the poetry collection The Metal and the Flower (1954), for which she received a Governor General's Award."

Page travelled with her husband on his diplomatic postings to Australia, Brazil, Mexico and Guatemala. In Brazil and Mexico, not hearing the rhythms of spoken English, she said, "I had a long dry spell, so I started painting and keeping a journal," published as Brazilian Journal and illustrated with her own paintings. She began writing poetry again following her return to Canada in the mid-1960s.

Her visual art, under her married name as P. K. Irwin, is in galleries and private collections, including the National Gallery of Canada in Ottawa.

She remained an active cultural collaborator and wrote steadily throughout the last years of her life in Oak Bay, British Columbia.

== Writing ==
Page's career can be divided into two periods: the first being the 1940s and 1950s, and the second starting with her return to Canada in the 1960s.

Her early poems "were inward-looking, imaginary biographies," which "rely heavily on suggestive imagery and the detailed depiction of concrete situations to express social concerns and transcendental themes ... such poems as 'The Stenographers' and 'The Landlady' focus on isolated individuals who futilely search for meaning and a sense of belonging. 'Photos of a Salt Mine' considered one of Page's best early poems, examines how art both conceals and reveals reality."

Northrop Frye wrote about her 1954 volume, The Metal and the Flower, that "if there is anything such as 'pure poetry,' this must be it: a lively mind seizing on almost any experience and turning it into witty verse.... Miss Page's work has a competent elegance about it that makes even the undistinguished poems still satisfying to look at."

Her later works showed "a new austerity in form and a reduction in the number of images presented." As well, there is a difference in type of image: "her later poems are often set abroad and suggest a path of liberation for the isolated, alienated individual.... Such poems as 'Bark Drawing' and 'Cook's Mountains' contain images outside the self as does 'Cry Ararat!' — a poem concerning the reconciliation of internal and external worlds, in which Mount Ararat symbolizes a place of rest [in] between."

Critic George Woodcock has said that Page's "most recent poems are more sharply and intensely visual than ever in their sensuous evocation of shape and color and space; their imagery takes us magically beyond any ordinary seeing into a realm of imagining in which the normal world is shaken like a vast kaleidoscope and revealed in unexpected and luminous relationships."

Page's 1972 apocalyptic tale of climate change, Unless the Eye Catch Fire, appeared in the literary journal The Malahat Review in the late 1970s and, in 1981, as the only prose piece in her poetry collection Evening Dance of the Grey Flies. Created later as a one-woman play by actor Joy Coghill and flautist Robert Cram at the Banff Centre for the Arts, it was performed in 1994 as part of the British Empire Games Festival in Victoria, British Columbia and, in 2002, at the National Arts Centre, Ottawa, and Trent University. A performance directed by David Duke was part of the Vancouver International Writers Festival in October 2009. Composer Gavin Bryers wrote music for a film version of Page's story by Anna Tchermakova, produced by Hilary Jones-Farrow for CBC Television. The June 1999 concert of Bryers' score, presented by The May Street Group and CBC Radio Two, was recorded for future broadcast.

== Recognition ==
Page won the Governor General's Award in 1954 for The Metal and the Flower, and the Canadian Authors Association Award in 1985 for The Glass Air.

In 1977, she was made an Officer of the Order of Canada and was promoted to Companion of the Order in 1998. In 2003, she was made a member of the Order of British Columbia.

BC Lt. Gov. Iona Campagnolo awarded her the first Lieutenant Governor's Award for Literary Excellence in 2004, calling Page "a true Renaissance woman." Page was also the recipient of the 2004 Terasen Lifetime Achievement Award.

In 2006, she was named a Fellow of the Royal Society of Canada. She held honorary degrees from University of Victoria (1985), University of Calgary (1989), University of Guelph (1990), Simon Fraser University (1990), University of Toronto (1998), University of Winnipeg (2001), Trent University (2004) and the University of British Columbia (2005).

Artworks by Mimmo Paladino inspired by and incorporating her poetry were installed with Page's calligraphy text panels for exhibits in Toronto (Istituto Italiano di Cultura/Italian Government Cultural Office, October 1998), in Victoria, British Columbia (Art Gallery of Greater Victoria, October 1999) and in Winnipeg (Winnipeg Art Gallery, January 2000). Several of Page's poems have been translated into languages other than English. A symposium on her work, "Extraordinary Presence: The Worlds of P.K. Page", was held in 2002 at Trent University.

Page was a "true Canadian literary and artistic icon," according to British Columbia Premier Gordon Campbell. As an artist and writer, P. K. Page promoted and developed Canadian culture with passion. Her efforts brought cultural growth to Canada that forged an artistic identity.

The National Film Board of Canada dedicated a 38-minute documentary to her career (Still Waters, directed by Montrealer Donald Winkler), In a special issue of The Malahat Review about Page and her work, Winkler writes about filming Page for the documentary segment on her childhood.

Coal and Roses, her last collection, was posthumously shortlisted for the Griffin Poetry Prize.

Journey with No Maps, a biography of Page by Sandra Djwa, was published in late 2012 and was a finalist for the 2013 Charles Taylor Prize for Literary Non-Fiction.

== P. K. Page Founders' Award for Poetry ==
A $1,000 poetry prize is awarded annually by the Malahat Review in Page's name. Its editor, Marilyn Bowering, said, "[Her] accomplishments have been an inspiration to several generations of writers," and declared that the award, called the P. K. Page Founders' Award for Poetry, would formalize Page's "long association with the Malahat Review!"

== Works ==
=== Poetry ===
- Unit of five: Louis Dudek, Ronald Hambleton, P.K. Page, Raymond Souster, James Wreford. Toronto: Ryerson Press, 1944.
- As ten, as twenty. Toronto: Ryerson Press, 1946.
- The Metal and the Flower. Toronto: McClelland & Stewart, 1954.
- Cook's Mountains – 1967
- Cry Ararat!: poems new and selected. Toronto: McClelland & Stewart, 1967.
- P.K. Page: Poems Selected and New. Toronto: Anansi, 1974. ISBN 0-88784-132-5
- Planes: poems. Toronto: Seripress, 1975 (with artist Doyle, Mike, 1928–). (limited edition of 50 numbered copies, signed by author and artist)
- Five Poems. Toronto: League of Canadian Poets, 1980.
- Evening Dance of the Grey Flies. Toronto: Oxford University Press, 1981. ISBN 0-19-540381-9.
- The Glass Air: poems selected and new. Toronto: Oxford University Press, (1985, 1991). ISBN 0-19-540506-4, ISBN 0-19-540840-3.
- Two Poems. Comox, B.C.: Nemo Press. 1988. (Limited edition of 150 copies.)
- Hologram: a Book of Glosas. London, Ont.: Brick Books, 1994. ISBN 0-919626-72-6. (Contains poems Hologram, The Gold Sun, Autumn, Poor Bird, Inebriate, In Memoriam, Presences, Planet Earth, Love's Pavilion, Alone, A Bagatelle, Exile, The Answer, The End.)
- The Hidden Room, Vol. 1. Erin, Ont.: The Porcupine's Quill, 1997. ISBN 0-88984-190-X.
- The Hidden Room, Vol. 2. Erin, Ont.: The Porcupine's Quill, 1997. ISBN 0-88984-193-4.
- Alphabetical. Published for the Hawthorne Society. Victoria, B.C.: Reference West, 1998. ISBN 978-1-894010-22-1.
- Cosmologies. Victoria, B.C.: Poppy Press, 2000. ISBN 1-894603-01-X. (Limited edition boxed set of 500 copies with Alphabetical, ISBN 1-894603-00-1.)
- And Once More Saw the Stars. – 2001
- Schizophrenic.
- This Heavy Craft
- Planet Earth: poems selected and new. Edited and with an introduction by Eric Ormsby. Erin, Ont.: Porcupine's Quill, 2002.
- Hand Luggage: A Memoir in Verse. Erin, Ont.: Porcupine's Quill, 2006. ISBN 978-0-88984-288-5.
- Coal and Roses. – 2009 (shortlisted for the 2010 Canadian Griffin Poetry Prize)
- The Golden Lilies – Poems by PK Page. – 2009
- Cullen. Outlaw Editions, 2009.
- Single Traveller

=== Prose ===
- The Sun and the Moon. [as Judith Cape] – 1944
- The Sun and the Moon and Other Fictions. Toronto: Anansi, 1973. ISBN 0-88784-327-1 (contents: The Sun and the Moon, The Neighbour, The Green Bird, The Woman, The Lord's Plan, Miracles, As One Remembers a Dream, George, The Glass Box)
- To Say the Least: Canadian Poets from A to Z. Edited and introduced by P.K. Page. Toronto: Press Porcépic, 1979. ISBN 0-88878-174-1
- Brazilian Journal. Toronto: Lester & Orpen Dennys, 1988. ISBN 0-88619-166-1.
- A Kind of Fiction. Erin, Ont.: Porcupine's Quill, 2001. ISBN 0-88984-220-5. (Contents include "Unless the Eye Catch Fire.")
- The Filled Pen: selected non-fiction. Edited by Zailig Pollock. Toronto: University of Toronto Press, 2007. ISBN 978-0-8020-9108-6.
- Up on the Roof. Erin, Ont.: Porcupine's Quill, 2007. ISBN 978-0-88984-287-8.
- You Are Here. Sidney, B.C.: Hedgerow Press, 2008. ISBN 978-0-9736882-8-3.

=== Children's books ===
- A Flask of Sea Water. Toronto: Oxford University Press, 1989. Illustrated by Lazlo Gal. ISBN 0-19-540704-0
- The Travelling Musicians. Toronto: Kids Can Press, 1991. Illustrated by Kady MacDonald Denton. (Adaptation of The Musicians of Bremen.) ISBN 1-55074-039-3
- The Goat that Flew. Victoria, B.C.: Beach Holme, 1993. Illustrated by Marika Gal. (Sequel to A Flask of Sea Water; second of the trilogy completed by The Sky Tree.) ISBN 0-88878-334-5
- A Grain of Sand. (2003)
- A Brazilian Alphabet for the Young Reader. (2005)
- Jake, the Baker, Makes a Cake. (2008)
- The Old Woman and the Hen. (2008)
- There Once Was a Camel. Victoria, B.C.: Ekstasis Editions, 2008. Illustrated by Kristi Bridgeman. ISBN 978-1-897430-31-6
- The Sky Tree: A Trilogy of Fables. Lantzville, B.C.: Oolichan Books, 2009. Illustrated by Kristi Bridgeman. ISBN 978-0-88982-258-0.
- Uirapurú: Based on a Brazilian Legend. Fernie, B.C.: Oolichan Books, 2010. Illustrated by Kristi Bridgeman. ISBN 978-0-88982-264-1.

== See also ==
- Canadian literature
- Canadian poetry
- List of Canadian poets
