= Raymond Knister =

Canadian poet, novelist, story writer and columnist (1899–1932)

- Born: John Raymond Knister; May 27, 1899; Ruscom, Ontario
- Died: August 29, 1932 (aged 33); Stoney Point, Ontario
- Resting place: Port Dover, Ontario
- Citizenship: British subject
- Spouse: Myrtle Gamble (1901–1995)
- Children: Imogen Roberta Givens (1930–2010)
- Writing career
- Language: English
- Notable awards: Graphic Publishers' Canadian Novel prize

John Raymond Knister (27 May 1899 – 29 August 1932) was a Canadian poet, novelist, story writer, columnist, and reviewer, "known primarily for his realistic narratives set in rural Canada ... Knister was a highly respected member of the Canadian literary community during the 1920s and early 1930s, and recent criticism has acknowledged him as a pioneer in establishing a distinctively modern voice in Canadian literature."

== Life ==
Born at Ruscom (now part of Lakeshore), Ontario, near Windsor, Knister attended Victoria College at the University of Toronto, but had to drop out after catching pneumonia. At the age of eighteen he began to take a serious interest in literature, writing his first poems and short stories. While in Toronto he contributed articles on Miguel de Cervantes and Robert Louis Stevenson to Acta Victoriana, the college literary magazine. He worked on his father's farm until 1923.

In 1919 Knister began writing and publishing stories and poems about Canadian farm life. He worked in 1922 and 1923 as a book reviewer for the Windsor Border Cities Star and the Detroit Free Press. He moved to Iowa in 1923 to become associate editor of literary magazine The Midland ("the most important magazine America had produced," according to H. L. Mencken) in Iowa City for a year. During the same time he took courses in creative writing at Iowa State University.

By 1924 Knister was a taxi driver in Chicago, as well as a reviewer for Poetry magazine and the Chicago Evening Post. "In 1926 he moved to Toronto, where he freelanced; his work appeared in the Toronto Star Weekly and Saturday Night." In Toronto he became acquainted with writers Morley Callaghan, Mazo de la Roche, Merrill Denison, and Charles G.D. Roberts.

Knister had work published in the Paris literary magazine This Quarter in 1925.

In 1926, Knister put together a collection of nature poetry, Windfalls for Cider. Toronto's Ryerson Press accepted the book for publication, but later had to cancel because of the company's finances.

Knister married Myrtle Gamble in 1927. They had one daughter, Imogen, born in 1930.

In 1928, Knister edited the anthology Canadian Short Stories. The Encyclopedia of Literature in Canada (2002) calls the book a "trend-setting anthology."

Knister published his first novel, White Narcissus, in 1929. The book is still in print as part of McClelland & Stewart's New Canadian Library series of classic Canadian literature.

Knister was fascinated with John Keats, the 19th century English Romantic poet who had died young. He accumulated "letters and stacks of books about Keats," according to his daughter, and enrolled his wife as a research assistant to help him go through it all. "Apparently, she was to use her reading time on this only, and he frowned upon her spending time reading women's magazines." The Knisters spent eight months researching Keats's life: the result was a 200,000-word, 700 page non-fiction novel, My Star Predominant.

In 1931, Knister moved to Montreal, Quebec. There he became acquainted with the poets of the Montreal Group – with poet Leo Kennedy he began planning an anthology, similar to his Canadian Short Stories, of Canadian modernist poetry (an idea that eventually resulted in the landmark New Provinces in 1936). He also got to know poet Dorothy Livesay and novelist Frederick Philip Grove.

Grove read My Star Predominant, and encouraged Knister to enter the manuscript in the Graphic Publishers' Canadian Novel contest. (Knister's daughter later said that her mother had encouraged him to enter the novel.) Knister cut the book to 120,000 words, mailed it off, and forgot about it. My Star Predominant won the $2,500.00 first prize in the 1931 cross-Canada contest. However, "owing to the failure of the firm of publishers which offered the prize," the novel was not published.

In 1932, Ryerson Press, which had picked up the rights to My Star Predominant, offered Knister a job as an editor. Before he was to begin working there, Knister drowned in a swimming accident on Lake St. Clair while on a picnic with his family. (In a memoir published in the 1949 Collected Poems of Raymond Knister, Livesay maintained that Knister had committed suicide. His wife and daughter strongly disputed that allegation.)

My Star Predominant was published in 1934 in Canada by Ryerson and also in England.

Knister's daughter, Imogen Givens, wrote a 5,000-word memoir of him, "Raymond Knister: Man or Myth?". The memoir, which made extensive use of her mother's diary, was published in the journal Essays on Canadian Writing (No. 16, Fall-Winter 1979–80).

In 2007, Alberta poet Micheline Mayler published Full Depth: The Raymond Knister Poems, an account of Knister's life and death written as a series of poems.

Knister is buried in Port Dover, Ontario. His poem "Change" is inscribed on his tombstone.

Dorothy Livesay has claimed that "Knister seemed to epitomize the struggle of a generation" ("Memoir" xxxvii). The struggle of his generation of writers was to bring Canadian poetry into the Twentieth Century. Like E.J. Pratt, W.W.E. Ross, Arthur Stringer (whose Open Water was the first book of modernist free verse by a Canadian), and others, Knister was a "Transitional modern" whose poetry, fiction, and criticism showed the effects of the many forces which were changing Canadian poetry and Canadian society.

== Writing ==
Besides his four novels, Knister wrote roughly one hundred poems, almost as many short stories and sketches, and dozens of critical works, including essays, editorials, and book reviews. "To his own writing and criticism, Knister brought a mind attuned to new literary developments."

=== Fiction ===
After 1925 Knister devoted less time to poetry and more to fiction. Two of his novels, White Narcissus and My Star Predominant, were published in his lifetime. Although he was known and respected by writers such as Morley Callaghan, Mazo de la Roche, Sir Charles G.D. Roberts, and A.J.M. Smith, Knister was never a popular success.

"Farm work provided him with realistic details for his stories and his first novel, White Narcissus (1929)." Set in rural Ontario, "The novel concerns a writer, Richard Milne, who returns home in order to make a final attempt to convince his childhood sweetheart, Ada Lethen, to marry him. Ada feels it is her duty to stay at home because for years, as a consequence of a quarrel, her parents have communicated only through her.... While the novel is usually and justly considered a work of realism, it has also been suggested that it contains elements of romanticism, and that the lyricism of some passages approaches prose-poetry."

Knister's fiction provides us with some important clues for a clearer understanding of his verse. In My Star Predominant Knister has Keats give voice to ideas about poetry which are really his own. The novel shows Keats going through a process of growth as an artist. He progresses from sentimentality to a desire for direct contact with life and from ignorance to self-knowledge. He says that "a man's knowledge of his faults, so they do not paralyse his endeavors, is a good thing" (p. 160) and he recalls that as a boy he would have granted artists exemption "from the common tribulations of mankind" (p. 267). Although Knister did not write poetry in the manner of Keats, it is plausible to assume that he went through a similar series of changes.

In 2006 Black Moss Press published There Was a Mr. Cristi, a previously unknown novel discovered by Knister's daughter Imogen. In it, Knister tells the tale of a woman who leaves her husband in 1930s Ontario, and moves to Toronto to open a boarding house. "What follows is a fascinating tale of life in the 1930s in a house that is inhabited by all these bizarre characters. In the background is the 'tall and dark and good looking' Mr. Cristi, and we begin to wonder if we will ever come to know him. He is shrouded in mystery as the characters in this rambling old house come alive vividly for us."

"Of Knister's many short stories, probably the best known is 'Mist-green oats', about a young man's break with his life on the family farm. His stories recurrently focus on some form of psychological initiation." For example, "The First Day of Spring," which "dramatizes the moment when an adolescent farmboy moves from imagining love's pleasures to learning about its possible horrors (a baby's murder, or at least a savage accident) and his naiveté gives way to a need for order."

Knister also wrote novellas. In "Innocent man" the story of a man's wedding frames the tale of his false arrest and wedding-night spent in a Chicago jail. During the night each prisoner tells the story not of his guilt but of his innocence; the tension between black and white prisoners, and between inmates and guards, threatens to explode in violence. "Peaches, peaches" is set on a fruit farm; as an overabundant crop of peaches ripens, a young man first encounters sexual politics.

=== Poetry ===
Change

I shall not wonder more, then,
But I shall know.

Leaves change, and birds, flowers,
And after years are still the same.

The sea's breast heaves in sighs to the moon,
But they are moon and sea forever.

As in other times the trees stand tense and lonely,
And spread a hollow moan of other times.

You will be you yourself,
I'll find you more, not else,
For vintage of the woeful years.

The sea breathes, or broods, or loudens,
Is bright or is mist and the end of the world;
And the sea is constant to change.

I shall not wonder more, then,
But I shall know.

— Raymond Knister, The Midland 8.12 (December 1922), 332.

Knister is now considered one of the first modern poets in Canada. His poetry, which contains powerful descriptions of nature, is usually associated with the imagist school, although Knister also employed the forms of the prose-poem ("Poisons"), the serial poem ("A row of horse stalls"), and the longer poem ("Corn husking").

Knister's imagist nature poetry includes "such poems as 'The Hawk,' 'Boy Remembers in the Field,' 'Lake Harvest,' 'A Row of Stalls,' and 'The Plowman,' which vividly depict rural experience and the Canadian landscape. In both his poetry and his fiction Knister presented sharply realistic portrayals of everyday images and events in order to illustrate their exceptional qualities, and communicated these impressions in a conversational language style." Also read the hokku-like "Reverie: The Orchard on the Slope," the metaphysical "Change", and the whimsical "The Quiet Snow."

Though the nationalist in him sometimes warned against Americanization, King was also a prime example of the increasing importance of American literature as an influence on Canadian writers in the Twenties. Knister served his literary apprenticeship in the American midwest and his poetry, like Carl Sandburg's, was regional and realistic. The American poet for whom Knister showed the highest regard was Edwin Arlington Robinson. In "A Great Poet for Today" Knister praised Robinson for his ability to create characters as well as any novelist and for his skill in adapting his form to suit the character he is describing. Robinson's style he said, "is clear and apparently casual, fitting the matter as well-made garments fit a form. It is a sinuous idiom which allows the freest expression to the foibles and intricacies of characters" (p. 413).

Although the forms of Knister's poetry were derived from the Imagists, he also owed a good deal to A.E. Housman and to the English Georgians. Aside from Robinson, "Housman was the poet for whom Knister had the highest praise." The qualities which Knister lauded in the work of the British poet are also central to his own verse. Knister commented upon the characters Housman had chosen. He said that "doubtless for centuries there had subsisted this soul-loving, life-loving, inarticulate but artlessly downright yeoman, the backbone of English armies and, in later stages, for all his rootedness in England, particularly rural England, the basis of such large things as colonization and world exploration," (p. 419). Of course, Knister's characters were also simple farmers, "soil-loving, life-loving, inarticulate."

Knister also commented upon Housman's portrayal of a youth's discovery of life's complexities and "of the inevitability of love and death" (p. 421). In his own poetry Knister explored the differences between the world of the child and that of the adult. The moment when the boy crosses from innocence to knowledge is central to a number of his stories as well.

Another side of A Shropshire Lad which received his approval was its realism. Knister claimed that it is this realism which accounted for the book's continued popularity. He contrasted Housman's realism with the artificiality of contemporaries:

there was the contrast with the reigning artificial Yellow Book school of the nineties, then in the ascendancy with Wilde, Yeats, Symons, Le Gallienne as high- priests ... Housman arrived on this flower plot scene with his lad made of the stuff of eternal human clay, with the high spirits, the wistfulness, the flesh and blood, dreams and passions known to the English scene for centuries and crying out for portrayal ... Here, in fine, was life, and the public which loved poetry was not long in discovering it.
(p. 425)

Despite these general similarities it is difficult to find specific echoes of Housman in Knister because their styles are so different.

One can also trace the effects of the Georgians upon Knister. Like Housman, many of them wrote about the country life and the people who lived close to the land. Once again it is easy to see how Knister shared general characteristics, but difficult to perceive specific similarities because of his imagist style. Two Georgians who seem to have especially influenced Knister are Edward Thomas and Edwin Muir, both of whom often describe farm life.

Poet Anne Burke says of Knister: "Like Edwin Arlington Robinson whom he reviewed as 'A Great Poet of Today' his work is exemplified by simple straightforward stanzas about modern life and aims at the starkness of absolute truth. Note 'Wind's Way,' 'Reply to August,' 'Night Whistling,' 'Moments When I'm Feeling Poems,' 'Autumn Clouds,' and others. The complexity of Knister's work, like that of Robert Frost, has been overlooked because of its surface simplicity, bucolic tone, and emphasis on exactly what the poet felt. Knister on his Ontario farm resembles the adolescent Frost especially A Boy's Will, 1913 and North of Boston, 1914."

In 2003 After Exile, the first reprint of Knister's verse in over 20 years, was released by Toronto's Exile Editions. The book presents dozens of poems never before in book form, plus 30 new poems, and selected prose pieces and letters.

== Critical Writing ==
Like his contemporaries in the McGill movement Knister was a rebel, and his criticism showed his dissatisfaction with the state of Canadian poetry and the Canadian literary milieu.

The most important point raised in Knister's critical writings, one which is applicable to his own verse, was his rejection of the sublime in the language and thought of poetry. In general Canadian taste favoured a style of writing which was "a refreshing haven of genuine romanticism to which the reader may retreat when he seeks an antidote to the intellectual tension imposed by the future progeny of 'The Wasteland' and 'Spoon River' " Knister, however, valued plough horses above winged ones, and in the foreword to the Collected Poems he set out his objectives as a poet. His primary aim was to make his poems 'real' and to escape the false tone which made most Canadian poetry of his day an inaccurate portrayal of life. In order to do this he intended to drop all attempts at idealistic sublimity and instead simply present the images of things as accurately as possible. "We would feel differently about many other common things if we saw them clearly enough" (vii–viii).

One more complaint which Knister had against Canadians was that they were 'colonials'. He ably described their cultural colonialism when he wrote of the "ideal Canadian litterateur" as

a man who has been educated as an English gentleman, though certain New England Universities will pass; in addition he should know about Canada as accurately and sympathetically as possible from the point of view of an omniscient tourist who, after all, knows better things. We want not so much to be different as to have had different experiences about which we can talk at tea as suavely as anybody. It amounts in fact to our wanting to be American or English with an added background which will lend chic.

Verse written by someone with such an outlook could not help but be unrealistic in its treatment of Canadian subjects. One need only look in issues of The Canadian Magazine from the period to find such poetry in abundance.

Knister also attacked the conservatism of Canadian taste, especially as it was reflected in the magazines. Arthur Stringer, in his opinion, was forced to become a writer of murder mysteries because the Canadian reading public refused to accept the innovative poetry in Open Water. Another example he cited was Pratt, whose poem "The Witches Brew" could not find a Canadian publisher until after it had appeared in The London Mercury. Knister himself was unable to find a Canadian magazine which would print his work:

My poems and stories were so Canadian and came so directly from the soil that Canadian editors would have nothing to do with them. The injustice was perhaps, trifling; the quite modest merits of my efforts were adequately rewarded by the audience, fit though few, of the "little" magazines [sic]. But they weren't morally subversive, nor eccentric mannered, these attempts. It seems gruesomely significant that not a Canadian editor would have anything to do with them. ("Canadian Literati," 162)

Implicit in his comments was the conviction that this conservatism was a direct result of colonialism and the dulled appetite for sublimity. His bitter feeling that he was one of a generation of writers who were being ignored is obvious.

Although many of Knister's contemporaries were equally unhappy with the state of Canadian poetry, only he dared to attack established writers by name. In "Canadian Letter" Knister dismissed Carman, Maclnnis, Leacock, Roberts, and D.C. Scott with the comment that "their contributions were made at a time when any impulse in a backwater would have been valued" (p. 381). Elsewhere he compared Lampman's style to "one of those rambling, barrack-like houses once common to New England and our own eastern landscapes," formerly stylish but now outdated. Just as the smaller bungalow had replaced the large family home, so too would the more compact verse replace nineteenth- century styles.

The tone of these attacks is disturbing. Leacock, Lampman, Roberts, and the others he mentioned do not deserve to be relegated to some literary trash heap. We must remember that at this time Roberts and the others had the status of literary giants and that one dramatic way for a newcomer to get attention has always been to play the part of the iconoclast. This, probably, was what Knister was doing in his excessively fierce criticism.

Knister was not, however, a mere fault-finder. He was prepared to offer a solution to the problems he perceived. In his opinion, Canada needed a little magazine "devoted to creative work ... perhaps only a few pages every month, yet chosen for vital quality ... which should give a voice to what is actually being lived among us" ("Canadian Letter," p. 379). Through this medium, he hoped, a distinctively Canadian voice would be heard.

== Publications ==
=== Poetry ===
- Collected Poems of Raymond Knister. Dorothy Livesay ed. Toronto, Ryerson, 1949.
- Windfalls for Cider: The poems of Ray Knister. Joy Kuropatwa ed. Windsor, ON: Black Moss, 1983.
- After Exile complete poems compiled by Gregory Betts (Exile, 2003)

=== Prose ===
- White Narcissus. London, UK: Cape, 1929. Toronto: Macmillan, 1929.
- Toronto: McClelland & Stewart New Canadian Library, 1962, 1990. ISBN 978-0-7710-9402-6
- My Star Predominant. Toronto: Ryerson, 1934.
- Selected Stories of Raymond Knister. Michael Gnarowski ed. Ottawa. U of Ottawa P, 1972.
- "Canadian Literati." Raymond Knister. Journal of Canadian Fiction, No. 14 (1975), 160.
- Raymond Knister: Poems, Stories and Essays ed. David Aronson (1975)
- The First Day of Spring. Stories and Other Prose. Toronto, Buffalo: U of Toronto P, 1976. ISBN 0-8020-2069-0, ISBN 0-8020-6198-2
- There Was a Mr. Cristi (Windsor: Black Moss, 2006) ISBN 0-88753-414-7
- Boy Remembers in the Field (2006)
- Grapes (2006)
- Hackman's Night. Windsor: Black Moss, 2007. ISBN 978-0-88753-442-3
- Soil in Smoke (unpublished)
- Turning Loam (unpublished)

=== Edited ===
- Canadian Short Stories. Toronto: Macmillan, 1928. Freeport, NY: Books for Libraries P, 1971.

=== Fonds ===
- The Raymond Knister papers. Bruce Whiteman comp. Hamilton, ON: Mills Memorial Library, McMaster U, 1981.
- Raymond Knister fonds. Rev. ed. Toronto: Victoria University Library, 2006.

Except where noted, bibliographic information courtesy of Online Guide to Writing in Canada.
