= Northern Review =

Canadian literary magazine (1945–1956)

Northern Review was a Montreal-based literary magazine published in Canada between 1945 and 1956. It resulted from the merger between two earlier magazines, Preview and First Statement, both of which were also Montreal-based. Poet and literary critic John Sutherland, who founded First Statement, became the managing editor of Northern Review. A number of well-known Canadian writers, including Patrick Anderson, A. M. Klein, Irving Layton, P. K. Page, F. R. Scott, and A. J. M. Smith also served as editors for various periods. In 1947, Sutherland's scathing review of Robert Finch's Governor General's Award-winning book, Poems, caused all of the latter-named editors, with the exception of Layton, to resign from the magazine's editorial board. Finch was a generally respected writer at the time who had been published alongside Klein, Scott, and Smith in the 1936 poetry anthology New Provinces, so Sutherland's denouncement of Finch hit a sore spot with his elder colleagues.

In spite of the controversy, Northern Review was the most significant Canadian literary magazine of its day, providing a forum for new Canadian poets with an ear for modernism, a mode toward which many longer-established and conservative magazines, such as Canadian Poetry Magazine, were reluctant. Northern Review was also an important source for Canadian literary criticism, at a time when few critics, including Canadian ones, regarded Canadian literature as a distinctive and worthwhile body of achievement. For all his irreverence and bluster, Sutherland distinguished himself as a perceptive voice for literary development in Canada, as did many others who contributed articles to the magazine.

By the late 1940s, Sutherland had established a small press called First Statement Press as a sideline to regular issues of Northern Review. Layton's first book, Now is the Place (1948), was among a handful of significant books published by the press, although Layton himself left the editorial board of Northern Review that same year. The Sutherland-edited Other Canadians: An Anthology of New Poetry in Canada, 1940-46, the first major collection devoted exclusively to modern Canadian poetry, was also issued by First Statement Press.

Sutherland converted to Catholicism in the early 1950s, and as a result Northern Review became more conservative in its editorial vision. Although Northern Review appeared destined for the more mainstream status and wider readership enjoyed by other Canadian magazines such as Canadian Forum and Maclean's, Sutherland's early death from cancer in 1956 put an end to Northern Review. In total, forty issues of the magazine were published, enough to make it a relative success story in an era of short-lived Canadian periodicals.
