= Raymond Souster =

Canadian poet (1921–2012)

Raymond Souster OC
- Born: Raymond Holmes Souster; January 15, 1921; Toronto, Ontario, Canada
- Died: October 19, 2012 (aged 91)
- Education: University of Toronto Schools, Humberside Collegiate Institute
- Occupation: Bank Vault Custodian
- Spouse: Rosalia Souster
- Writing career
- Language: English
- Genre: Poetry
- Notable work: The Colour of the Times
- Notable awards: Governor General's Award

Raymond Holmes Souster OC (January 15, 1921 – October 19, 2012) was a Canadian poet whose writing career spanned over 70 years. More than 50 volumes of his own poetry were published during his lifetime, and he edited or co-edited a dozen volumes of poetry by others. A resident of Toronto all of his life, he has been called that city's "most loved poet".

Robert Fulford wrote of Souster in 1998: "You can't read the history of Canadian poetry without encountering him, yet somehow he remains obscure. His legendary shyness has created, over five decades, a curious form of anonymity: he's at once omnipresent and invisible."

== Life ==
Born in Toronto, Ontario, Souster grew up in West Toronto near the Humber River (Canada). After graduating from the University of Toronto Schools, he joined the Canadian Imperial Bank of Commerce at King & Bay Streets in Toronto in 1939. Apart from four years' service in the Royal Canadian Air Force during World War II, he worked at the bank until retiring in 1984. Souster's first published poem appeared in First Statement, the little magazine founded by John Sutherland in Montreal in 1942. In 1943, while still in the air force, Souster and two friends launched their own little poetry magazine, Direction. In 1944 he placed 21 poems in the anthology Unit of Five, alongside poetry by Louis Dudek, Ronald Hambleton, P. K. Page, and James Wreford. With Dudek and Irving Layton, Souster founded Contact magazine and Contact Press in 1952. The magazine lasted only until 1954, but Contact Press put out books until 1967. Its first book was Cerberus, an anthology of poetry by the trio. All three would be prolific writers for Contact Press over the next decade. Contact Press published Souster's Selected Poems, edited by Dudek, in 1956, which brought Souster his first serious critical attention. In 1956, under the Contact Press imprint, Souster brought out a small booklet titled "Experiment 1923-29." It contained the modernist poetry that Canadian poet W.W.E. Ross had written in the 1920s. Thus, Souster saved Ross's work from obscurity. Souster also helped new writers. He edited two anthologies for Contact, Poets 56 in 1956, and New Wave Canada: The New Explosion in Poetry in 1966. "Souster brought several young poets to Contact Press, and gave an important boost to the new poetry with New Wave Canada." The young poets included Margaret Atwood, whose first book, "The Circle Game" went on to win the Governor General's Award in 1966. Michael Ondaatje has said the following of Souster: "He brought many of us to the surface and we owe him everything." Souster was one of the six founders of the League of Canadian Poets in 1966. He was the League's first president from 1967 to 1972. The early 1960s were a prolific and distinguished period for Souster, culminating in his own Governor General's Award in 1964 for his Collected Poems, The Colour of the Times. "In the late 1960s, he embarked on the revision of his early poetry with a view to its reissue," a project that resulted in a Selected Poems in 1972, and the first four volumes of a now ten-volume Collected Poems in 1980, all of which were published by Oberon Press. Souster has also written fiction under the pseudonyms of "Raymond Holmes" and "John Holmes", for which he has drawn on his Air Force experience.

== Writing ==
Souster is a chronicler of his birth city. Robert Fulford wrote that "many of us think of him first as the poet-in-chief of Toronto. A city comes to life only after writers have invented it, and Souster has been among Toronto's inventors, adding a layer of poetic reality to the abstractions of asphalt, glass, and brick. His Toronto poems work like photographs in the Henri Cartier-Bresson tradition, inscribing small pieces of space and time on the memory, catching a moment as it flies."

Souster was the Canadian poet of his generation most overtly interested in, and influenced by, the contemporary American scene. He was first attracted to Henry Miller, and later entered into lasting friendships and correspondence with Robert Creeley and Cid Corman.

== Recognition ==
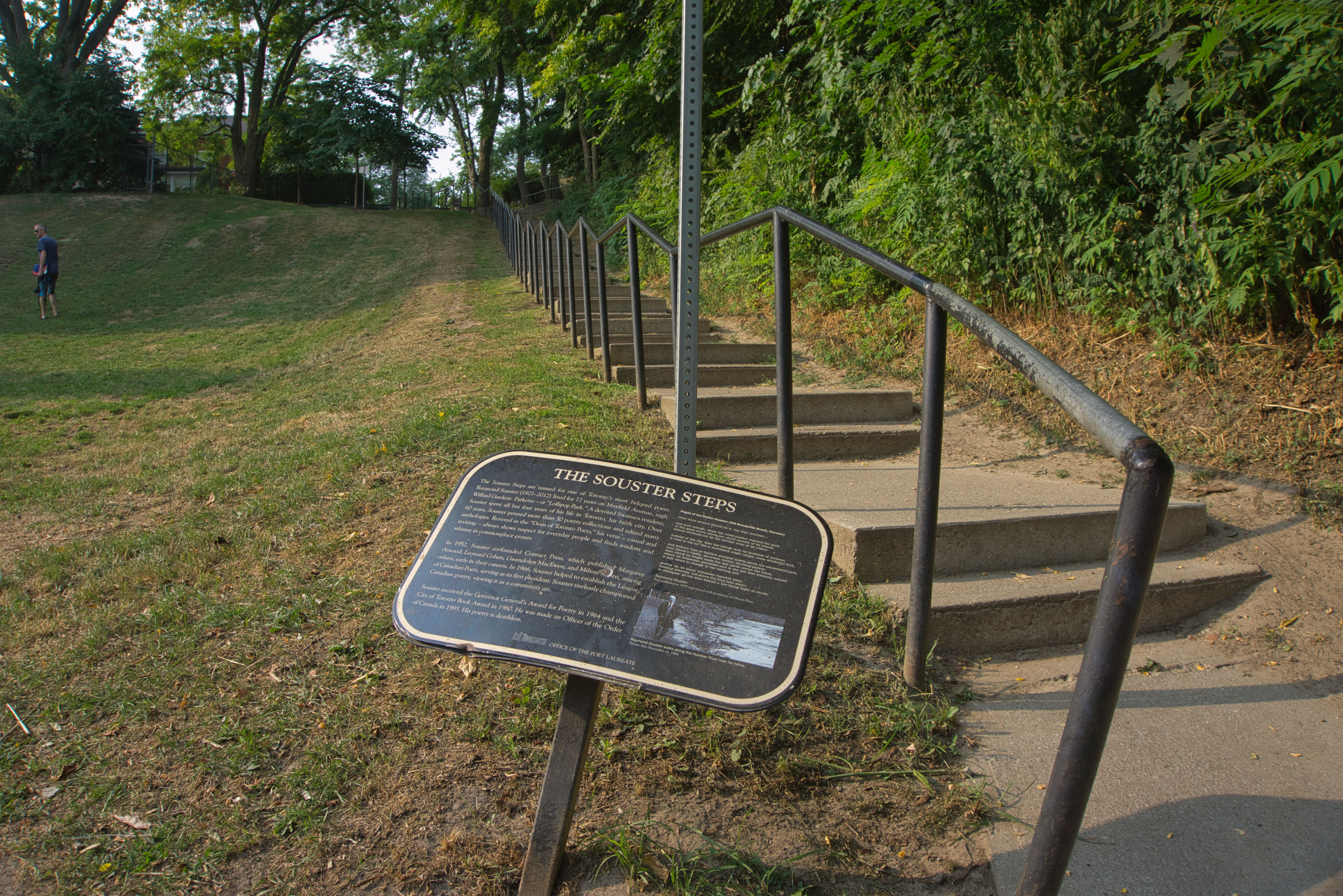
The Souster Steps in Swansea, Toronto are named after him due to his affiliation with the area.

Souster won the Governor General's Award in 1964 for The Colour of the Times.

He was awarded a Centennial Medal in 1967.

Hanging In (1979) won the City of Toronto Book Award in 1980.

Raymond Souster was named an Officer of the Order of Canada in 1995. The Order of Canada website says of him: "One of Canada's most important, widely-read and enduring poets, he has been a vital force for the renewal of poetry since the 1940s. His poems describe life in Toronto, ordinary people and the daily events, feelings and experiences of modern city living. A co-founder of the Canadian League of Poets, he has been a source of encouragement and inspiration to several generations of poets while promoting Canadian literature among students of all ages."

Souster's Uptown Downtown (2006) was nominated for the 2007 City of Toronto Book Award.

== Publications ==
=== Poetry ===
- When We Are Young. Montreal: First Statement, 1945.
- Go To Sleep, World. Toronto: Ryerson, 1947.
- City Hall Street. Toronto: Ryerson, 1951.
- with Irving Layton and Louis Dudek. Cerberus. Toronto: Contact Press, 1952.
- Shake Hands with the Hangman: Poems 1940-52 Toronto: Contact Press, 1953.
- A Dream That Is Dying. Toronto: Contact Press, 1954.
- Walking Death. Toronto: Contact Press, 1954.
- For What Time Slays. Toronto: Contact Press, 1955.
- The Selected Poems. Louis Dudek ed. Toronto: Contact Press, 1956.
- Crepe-Hanger's Carnival: Selected Poems 1955-58 Toronto: Contact Press, 1958.
- A Local Pride. Toronto: Contact Press, 1962.
- Place of Meeting: Poems 1958-1960 (includes lithographs by Michael Snow) Isaacs Gallery / Gallery Editions II, 1962.
- The Colour of the Times. Toronto: McGraw-Hill Ryerson, 1964.
- Ten Elephants on Yonge Street. Toronto: McGraw-Hill Ryerson, 1965.
- As Is. Toronto: Oxford University Press, 1967.
- Lost and Found: Uncollected Poems. Toronto: Clarke, Irwin, 1968.
- So Far, So Good: Poems, 1938/1968. Ottawa: Oberon Press, 1969.
- The Years. Ottawa: Oberon Press, 1971.
- Selected Poems of Raymond Souster. Michael Maklem ed. Ottawa: Oberon Press, 1972.
- The Colour of the Times. Ten Elephants on Yonge Street. Toronto: McGraw-Hill Ryerson, 1973.
- Change-Up: New Poems. Ottawa: Oberon Press, 1974.
- Double Header: As Is; Lost & Found. Ottawa: Oberon Press, 1975.
- Rain-Check. Ottawa: Oberon Press, 1975.
- To Hell with Poetry. Burton, Ohio, 1976.
- Extra Innings: New Poems. Ottawa: Oberon Press, 1977.
- Hanging In: New Poems. Ottawa: Oberon Press, 1979.
- Uniform Title - 1980
- Going the Distance. Ottawa: Oberon Press, 1983.
- Jubilee of Death: The Raid On Dieppe. Ottawa: Oberon Press, 1984.
- Queen City. Ottawa: Oberon Press, 1984.
- Flight of the Roller-Coaster: Poems for Younger Readers. Ottawa: Oberon Press, 1985.
- and James Deahl. Into This Dark Earth. Toronto: Unfinished Monument Press, 1985.
- It Takes All Kinds. Ottawa: Oberon Press, 1986.
- The Eyes of Love. Ottawa: Oberon Press, 1987.
- Asking for More. Ottawa: Oberon Press, 1988.
- Running Out the Clock. Ottawa: Oberon Press, 1991.
- Old Bank Notes. Ottawa: Oberon Press, 1993.
- Riding the Long Black Horse. Ottawa: Oberon Press, 1993.
- No Sad Songs Wanted Here. Ottawa: Oberon Press, 1995.
- Close to Home. Ottawa: Oberon Press, 1996.
- Of Time & Toronto. Ottawa: Oberon Press, 2000.
- Take Me Out to the Ballgame. Ottawa: Oberon Press, 2002.
- Twenty-three New Poems. Ottawa: Oberon Press, 2003.
- Down to Earth Battered Silicon Dispatch Box, 2006.
- Wondrous Wobbly World: Poems for the New Millennium Battered Silicon Dispatch Box, 2006.
- Uptown Downtown Battered Silicon Dispatch Box, 2006.
- Collected Poems of Raymond Souster 10 vols. Ottawa: Oberon Press, 1980–2004. (covering 1940 - 2000)
- What Men Will Die For, with Les Green, 400 page docupoem: Battered Silicon Dispatch Box, 2007
- Never Counting The Cost, with Les Green, Nine Verse Vignettes of War and Peace, 270 pages: Battered Silicon Dispatch Box, 2012
- Come Rain, Come Shine: The Last Poems of Raymond Souster. Donna Dunlop ed. Toronto: Contact Press, 2014.

=== Fiction ===
- The Winter of Time - 1949 (as "Raymond Holmes")
- On Target. Village Bookstore Press, 1972. (as "John Holmes")
- and Douglas Alcorn. From Hell to Breakfast. Toronto: Intruder Press, 1980.

=== Edited ===
- Direction, 1943–1946.
- Enterprise, 1948.
- Contact, 1952–1954.
- W.W.E. Ross, Experiment 1923-1929 Toronto: Contact Press, 1956.
- Poets 56: Ten Younger English-Canadians. Toronto: Contact Press, 1956.
- Combustion., 1957–1960.
- New Wave Canada: The New Explosion in Canadian Poetry. Toronto: Contact Press, 1966.
- and Douglas Lochhead, eds. New Poems of the Seventies. Ottawa: Oberon Press, 1970.
- and Douglas Lochhead, eds. Made in Canada. Ottawa: Oberon Press, 1970.
- and Richard Woollatt, eds. Generation now. Longman Canada: 1970.
- and Richard Woollatt, eds. Sights and Sounds. Toronto: Macmillan, 1973.
- and Douglas Lochhead, eds. 100 Poems of Nineteenth Century Canada. Toronto: Macmillan of Canada, 1974.
- and Richard Woollatt, eds. These Loved, These Hated Lands. Toronto: Doubleday of Canada, 1975.
- Vapour and Blue: Souster selects Campbell: the poetry of William Wilfred Campbell. Paget Press, 1978.
- and Richard Woollatt, eds. Poems of a Snow-Eyed Country. Don Mills, ON: Academic Press, 1980.
- and Douglas Lochhead, eds. Powassan's Drum: Selected Poems of Duncan Campbell Scott Ottawa: Tecumseh, 1985.
- and Douglas Lochhead, eds. Windflower: Poems Of Bliss Carman. Ottawa: Tecumseh, 1985. ISBN 978-0-919662-07-0

Except where noted, bibliographical information courtesy University of Toronto.

== Discography ==
- Celebration: Famous Canadian Poets CD – Canadian Poetry Association – 2001 ISBN 1-55253-032-9 (CD#3) (with Gwendolyn MacEwen )

== See also ==
- Canadian literature
- Canadian poetry
- List of Canadian poets
