= Patrick Anderson (poet) =

English-Canadian poet (1915–1979)

- Born: 4 August 1915; Ashtead, England
- Died: 17 March 1979 (aged 63); Halstead, England
- Education: Oxford University; Columbia University; McGill University
- Occupation: poet

Patrick John MacAllister Anderson (4 August 1915 – 17 March 1979) was an English-Canadian poet. He was educated at Oxford, where he was elected President of the Union, and Columbia. He taught in Montreal at Selwyn House School from 1940 to 1946 and at McGill University between 1948 and 1950. One of his students at both schools was Charles Taylor.

In March 1942, Anderson and Montreal Group poet F. R. Scott founded Montreal literary magazine Preview; A.M. Klein and P. K. Page also became part of the editorial group. According to The Canadian Encyclopedia, "Preview's orientation was cosmopolitan; its members looked largely towards the English poets of the 1930s for inspiration."

In 1943, critic John Sutherland published a review of Anderson's poetry in rival magazine First Statement which suggested homoerotic themes in his writing, and accusing Anderson of "some sexual experience of a kind not normal"; although Anderson would in fact come out as gay later in life, he was married at the time to Peggy Doernbach, and threatened to sue. Sutherland printed a retraction in the following issue. The incident was little known outside of Montreal at the time, as both magazines had small, primarily local circulations, although it would come to be more extensively analyzed in the 1990s as an important incident in the history of LGBT literature in Canada.

Anderson and Doernbach were members of the Labor-Progressive Party, and were active supporters of Labour-Progressive MP Fred Rose.

Preview merged with First Statement in 1945 to become Northern Review.

Following his divorce from Doernbach in 1950, Anderson left Canada, teaching for two years in Malaysia before returning to England. He subsequently entered into a same-sex relationship with Alistair Sutherland, with whom he co-edited Eros: An Anthology of Male Friendship in 1961; in this era, he also published memoirs and travel writing. Despite this, he continued to treat his sexuality as a private matter, declining inclusion in an anthology of gay male literature in 1972. He remained a resident of England for the rest of his life, although he sometimes returned to Canada in the 1970s as a guest lecturer; his final volume of poetry, published in 1977, was titled Return to Canada.

== Selected bibliography ==
- 1943: Military Camp
- 1945: A Tent for April
- 1946: The White Centre
- 1953: The Colour as Naked
- 1955: Snake Wine: A Singapore Episode
- 1957: Search Me - Autobiography: The Black Country, Canada and Spain
- 1958: First steps in Greece
- 1961: Finding Out About the Athenians
- 1961: Eros: An Anthology of Male Friendship
- 1963: Dolphin Days - a writer's notebook of Mediterranean pleasures
- 1963: The character ball - chapters of autobiography.
- 1964: The Smile of Apollo: A Literary Companion to Greek Travel
- 1969: Over the Alps: Reflections on Travel and Travel Writing
- 1976: A Visiting Distance - Poems: New, Revised, And Selected
- 1977: Return to Canada

== See also ==
- Canadian literature
- Canadian poetry
- List of Canadian poets
- List of Canadian writers
