= Irving Layton =

Romanian-born Canadian poet (1912–2006)

Irving Layton OC
- Born: Israel Pincu Lazarovitch; March 12, 1912; Târgu Neamț, Kingdom of Romania
- Died: January 4, 2006 (aged 93); Côte Saint-Luc, Quebec, Canada
- Education: McGill University (BSc, MA)
- Occupations: Poet; professor
- Spouses: Faye Lynch (m. 1938; div.); Betty Sutherland (m. 1940s; div. 1978); Harriet Bernstein (m. 1978; div.); Anna Pottier (m. 1980s; sep. 1995)
- Children: 4 (including Max Layton)
- Writing career
- Notable works: A Red Carpet for the Sun; Waiting for the Messiah
- Notable awards: Governor General's Award (1959); Petrarch Award

Irving Peter Layton, OC (March 12, 1912 – January 4, 2006) was a Romanian-born Canadian poet. He was known for his "tell it like it is" style which won him a wide following but also made him enemies. As T. Jacobs notes in his biography (2001), Layton fought Puritanism throughout his life:

Layton's work had provided the bolt of lightning that was needed to split open the thin skin of conservatism and complacency in the poetry scene of the preceding century, allowing modern poetry to expose previously unseen richness and depth.

== Life ==
=== Early life ===
Irving Layton was born on March 12, 1912, as Israel Pincu Lazarovitch in Târgu Neamţ to Romanian Jewish parents, Moses and Klara (née Moscovitch) Lazarovitch. He migrated with his family to Montreal, Quebec in 1913, where they lived in the impoverished St. Urbain Street neighbourhood, later made famous by the novels of Mordecai Richler. There, Layton and his family (his father died when Irving was 13) faced daily struggles with, among others, Montreal's French Canadians, who were uncomfortable with the growing numbers of Jewish newcomers. Layton, however, identified himself not as an observant Jew but rather as a freethinker.

Layton graduated from Alexandra Elementary School and attended Baron Byng High School, where his life was changed when he was introduced to such poets as Tennyson, Walter Scott, Wordsworth, Byron, and Shelley; the novelists Jane Austen and George Eliot; the essayists Francis Bacon, Oliver Goldsmith, Samuel Johnson, and Jonathan Swift; and also Shakespeare and Darwin. He was befriended by David Lewis and became very interested in politics and social theory. He joined the Young People's Socialist League or YPSL (commonly pronounced "Yipsel"), which Lewis led. He began reading Karl Marx and Nietzsche. His activities in YPSL were deemed a threat to the high school administration, and he was asked to leave before graduating in 1930. It was Lewis who introduced Layton to A. M. Klein. Lewis asked Klein to be Layton's Latin tutor so he could pass the junior matriculation exams. Lewis gave him $10 to pay the fee for the exam and he passed. It was also during his time with Klein that he became interested in the sound of poetry.

Klein and I met once weekly at Fletcher's Field just across from the YHMA [sic] on Mt. Royal Avenue, and I vividly recall the first lesson: Virgil's Aeneid, Book II:I
...hearing Klein roll off the Virgilian hexameters in a beautiful orotund voice that rose above the traffic, I think it was then that I realized how lovely and very moving the sound of poetry could be. I must confess my Latin wasn't sufficient to appreciate the sense that Virgil was making with his marvelous hexameters, but Klein's zeal and enthusiasm, his forceful delivery, his very genuine love of language, of poetry, all came through to me at that time. And I think that was most fortunate for me. ...

Klein published Layton's first poem in The McGilliad, the underground campus journal he was editing at McGill University.

=== Emerging poet: 1930s and 1940s ===
Despite Layton's limited educational opportunities, his lack of a high school diploma, and his limited finances, he enrolled in Macdonald College (McGill) in 1934 and received a Bachelor of Science degree in Agriculture.

While in college, he was well-known in artistic circles for his anti-bourgeois attitudes and his criticism of politics. He quickly found that his true interest was poetry, so he pursued a career as a poet, and soon became friends with the emerging young poets of his day, including fellow Canadian poets John Sutherland, Raymond Souster, and Louis Dudek. In the 1940s, Layton and his fellow Canadian poets rejected the older generation of poets, as well as critics Northrop Frye; their efforts helped define the tone of the post-war generation of poets in Canada. Essentially, they argued that English Canadian poets should set their own style, independent of British styles and influences, and should reflect the social realities of the day.

In 1936 Layton met Faye Lynch, whom he married in 1938. When Layton graduated from Macdonald College in 1939, he moved with Faye to Halifax, where he worked odd jobs, including a stint as a Fuller Brush salesman. Soon disenchanted with his life, Layton decided to return to Montreal. He began teaching English to recent immigrants to make ends meet and continued doing so for many years.

Indecisive about his future and enraged by Hitler's violence toward Jews and destruction of European culture, Layton enlisted in the Canadian army in 1942. While training at Petawawa, Layton met Betty Sutherland, an accomplished painter (and later poet), and a half-sister to actor Donald Sutherland. Layton soon divorced Faye and married Betty. They had two children together: Max Reuben (1946) and Naomi Parker (1950). In 1943 Layton was given an honourable discharge from the army and returned to Montreal, where he became involved with several literary magazines including the seminal Northern Review, which he co-edited with John Sutherland.

Layton's involvement with David Lewis and the Young People's Socialist League developed into activism with the Co-operative Commonwealth Federation (Lewis was the National Secretary at the time). Because of his YPSL activities Layton was blacklisted in the 1930s and banned from entering the United States for the next two decades. While for a time he still considered himself a Marxist, he became anti-Communist at the lectures Lewis gave at YPSL and broke with many on the left with his support of the Vietnam War.

=== 1950s: International "stardom" ===
"Of the poets who emerged in Montréal during this period," of the early 1950s, "Layton was the most outspoken and flamboyant. His satire was generally directed against bourgeois dullness, and his famous love poems were erotically explicit."

By the mid-1950s, Layton's activism and poetry had made him a staple on the CBC televised debating program Fighting Words, where he earned a reputation as a formidable debater. The publication of A Red Carpet for the Sun in 1959 secured Layton's national reputation while the many books of poetry that followed eventually gave him an international reputation, never as high however, in the United States and Britain as it was in some countries where Layton was read in translation.

In 1946 Layton received an M.A. in economics and political science from McGill, with a thesis on Harold Laski. Three years later he began teaching English, history, and political science at the Jewish parochial high school Herzliah (a branch of the United Talmud Torahs of Montreal). He was an influential teacher, and some of his students became writers and artists. Among his students was future television magnate Moses Znaimer. Layton continued to teach for the greater part of his life: as a teacher of modern English and American poetry at Sir George Williams University (now Concordia University) and as a tenured professor at Toronto's York University from 1969 to 1978. At York one of his first students was Joseph Pivato who became a writer, critic and academic. Layton delivering many lectures and readings throughout Canada. Layton pursued his PhD in 1948, but he abandoned it due to the demands of his already hectic professional life. In 1976, he received an honorary doctorate from Concordia University.

In the late 1950s, friends introduced Layton to Aviva Cantor, who had emigrated to Montreal from her native Australia in 1955. After several years of painful indecision, Layton and Betty separated, and Layton moved in with Aviva. The two had a son, David, in 1964. Though Layton remained legally married to Betty, his relationship with Aviva lasted more than twenty years, ending only in the late 1970s when Aviva left.

Layton also met Leonard Cohen, with whom he remained friends for life and who dedicated his 2007 book The Book of Longing to Layton. Cohen also dedicated his song Go No More A-Roving on his 2004 album Dear Heather to Layton. The song was basen upon a poem by Lord Byron.

Layton was also admired by such diverse artists and writers as Allen Ginsberg, Bob Dylan, among other poets.

=== Later years ===
In 1974 Irving met Harriet Bernstein, who was enrolled in his Poetry Workshop at York University. Although he was still living with Aviva, Irving and Harriet began an affair that continued for four years, culminating in their legal marriage in November 1978. In order to marry Harriet, Irving finally took the required legal action to divorce Betty, which he had neglected to do until this time. In 1981 a daughter, Samantha Clara, was born to Harriet and Irving. The marriage ended in a bitterly contested divorce. Layton then met Anna (Annette) Pottier and invited her to be his housekeeper, although it soon became apparent that she would play a far greater role in his life. Although 48 years his junior she became his fifth and last wife. They lived briefly in Niagara-on-the-Lake in the fall of 1982 and then spent nearly a year in Oakville, Ontario, before moving to the Montreal district of Notre-Dame-de-Grâce at the end of 1983. It was here that Layton wrote his memoir Waiting For the Messiah and with Pottier's support saw to the publication of his final books and translations. The couple eventually agreed that Pottier needed to begin a life of her own, and she moved out on March 1, 1995. Friends took care of Layton after he was diagnosed with Alzheimer's disease. He died at the Maimonides Geriatric Centre in Côte Saint-Luc at the age of 93 on January 4, 2006.

In 2015 Pottier published her memoir, Good As Gone: My Life With Irving Layton (Dundurn Press, March 14, 2015).

== Recognition ==
Throughout the 1950s and on into the early 1990s Layton travelled widely abroad and became especially popular in South Korea and Italy. In 1981 these two nations nominated him for the Nobel Prize for Literature. (The prize that year was instead awarded to Colombian novelist Gabriel García Márquez.) Among his many awards during his career was the Governor-General's Award for A Red Carpet for the Sun in 1959. In 1976 he was made an Officer of the Order of Canada. He was the first non-Italian to be awarded the Petrarch Award for Poetry.

In his lifetime Layton attracted some criticism for his abrasiveness, egotism, and acrimonious feuds, including one with biographer Elspeth Cameron. He is remembered by many as one of the first Canadian rebels of poetry, politics, and philosophy. At Layton's funeral, Leonard Cohen, Moses Znaimer, and David Solway were among those who gave eulogies.

A street in Côte St-Luc has been named Irving Layton Avenue. It is located behind St. Richards Church and close to the corner of Guelph Road and Parkhaven Avenue.

An online scholarly journal, The Bull Calf (founded by Kait Pinder and J.A. Weingarten), is named in honour of Layton's famous poem of the same name.

He is considered Leonard Cohen's literary mentor. Leonard Cohen once said of Layton, "I taught him how to dress, he taught me how to live forever."

He is depicted in the drama television series So Long, Marianne, in which he is portrayed by Peter Stormare.

== Publications ==
=== Poetry ===
- Here and Now. Montreal: First Statement Press, 1945.
- Now Is The Place: Stories and Poems. Montreal: First Statement Press, 1948.
- The Black Huntsmen: Poems. Montreal: 1951.
- With Louis Dudek and Raymond Souster. Cerberus. Toronto: Contact Press, 1952.
- Love the Conqueror Worm. Toronto: Contact Press, 1953.
- In the Midst of My Fever. Palma de Mallorca, Spain: Divers Press, 1954.
- The Long Pea-Shooter. Montreal: Laocoon Press, 1954.
- The Blue Propeller. Toronto: Contact Press, 1955.
- The Cold Green Element. Toronto: Contact Press, 1955.
- The Bull Calf and Other Poems. Toronto: Contact Press, 1956.
- The Improved Binoculars: Selected Poems. Introduction by William Carlos Williams. Highlands, NC: Jonathan Williams, 1956. 2nd edition 1957. Toronto: Porcupine’s Quill, 1991. ISBN 0-88984-101-2
- Music on a Kazoo. Toronto: Contact Press, 1956.
- A Laughter in the Mind. Highlands, NC: Jonathan Williams, 1958. 2nd edition Montreal: Editions d'Orphée, 1959.
- A Red Carpet for the Sun. Toronto: McClelland and Stewart, 1959.
- The Swinging Flesh Toronto: McClelland and Stewart, 1961. (poems and stories)
- Balls for a One-Armed Juggler Toronto: McClelland and Stewart, 1963.
- The Laughing Rooster. Toronto: McClelland and Stewart, 1964.
- Collected Poems. Toronto: McClelland and Stewart, 1965.
- Periods of the Moon: Poems. Toronto: McClelland and Stewart, 1967.
- The Shattered Plinths. Toronto: McClelland and Stewart, 1968.
- Selected Poems. Wynne Francis ed. Toronto: McClelland and Stewart, 1969. London: Charisma, 1977.
- The Whole Bloody Bird: Obs, Aphs & Pomes. Toronto: McClelland and Stewart, 1969.
- Poems to Color – 1970
- The Collected Poems of Irving Layton. Toronto: McClelland and Stewart, 1971.
- Nailpolish. Toronto: McClelland and Stewart, 1971.
- Lovers and Lesser Men. Toronto: McClelland and Stewart, 1973.
- The Pole-Vaulter. Toronto: McClelland and Stewart, 1974.
- Seventy-five Greek Poems, 1951–1974. Athens: Hermias Publications, 1974.
- The Darkening Fire: Selected Poems, 1945–1968. Toronto: McClelland and Stewart, 1975.
- The Unwavering Eye: Selected Poems, 1969–1975. Toronto: McClelland and Stewart, 1975.
- The Uncollected Poems of Irving Layton: 1936–59. Ed. W. David John. Ottawa, Ontario: Mosaic Press, 1976.
- For my Brother Jesus. Toronto: McClelland and Stewart, 1976.
- The Poems of Irving Layton. Eli Mandel ed. Toronto: McClelland and Stewart, 1977. Also published, with an introduction by Hugh Kenner, as The Selected Poems of Irving Layton. New York: New Directions, 1977. ISBN 0-8112-0642-4
- Rhine Boat Trip – 1977
- The Covenant. Toronto: McClelland and Stewart, 1977.
- The Tightrope Dancer. Toronto: McClelland and Stewart, 1978.
- The Love Poems of Irving Layton. Toronto: Canadian Fine Editions, 1978. Toronto: McClelland and Stewart, 1980.
- Droppings from Heaven. Toronto: McClelland and Stewart, 1979.
- The Tamed Puma. Toronto: Virgo Press, 1979.
- There Were No Signs. Toronto: Madison Gallery, 1979.
- For My Neighbours in Hell. Oakville, Ontario: Mosaic Press, 1980. ISBN 0-88962-111-X
- Europe And Other Bad News. Toronto: McClelland and Stewart, 1981.
- A Wild Peculiar Joy: Selected Poems, 1945–82 Toronto: McClelland and Stewart, 1982. 2nd edition 1989. "There Were No Signs" from A Wild Peculiar Joy, online at CBC Words at Large
- Shadows on the Ground: A Portfolio – 1982
- The Gucci Bag. Oakville, Ontario: Mosaic Press, 1983. Toronto: McClelland and Stewart, 1983. Flatiron Book Distributors, 1995. ISBN 0-88962-245-0.
- The Love Poems of Irving Layton: With Reverence & Delight. Oakville, Ontario: Mosaic Press, 1984. Toronto: Mosaic Press; 2002. ISBN 0-88962-246-9
- A Spider Danced a Cosy Jig. Toronto: Stoddart, 1984.
- Dance With Desire: Love Poems. Toronto:McClelland & Stewart, 1986. Dance With Desire: Selected Love Poems. Toronto: Porcupine’s Quill, 1992. ISBN 0-88984-135-7
- Fortunate Exile. Toronto: McClelland and Stewart, 1987. ISBN 0-7710-4947-1.
- Final Reckoning: Poems, 1982–1986. Oakville, Ontario: Mosaic Press, 1987.
- Fornalutx: Selected Poems, 1928–1990. Montreal: McGill-Queen's University Press, 1992. ISBN 0-7735-0963-1

=== Letters ===
- An Unlikely Affair: The Irving Layton – Dorothy Rath Correspondence. Toronto: Mosaic Press, 1990. ISBN 0-88962-101-2.
- Wild Gooseberries: The Selected Letters of Irving Layton – Toronto: Macmillan, 1989. ISBN 978-0-7715-9424-3
- Irving Layton and Robert Creeley: The Complete Correspondence, 1953–1978. Toronto: McGill-Queens University Press, 1990. ISBN 0-7735-0657-8.

Except where noted, bibliographical information courtesy University of Toronto.

== Discography ==
- Six Montreal Poets. New York: Folkways Records, 1957. Includes A.J.M. Smith, Leonard Cohen, Irving Layton, F. R. Scott, Louis Dudek, and A.M. Klein. (cassette, 60 mins).
- Irving Layton at Le Hibou. c. 1962. (L.p.)
- Poems of Irving Layton. Jewish Public Library, c. 1965. (cassette)
- Irving Layton. Sir George Williams University, 1967. (cassette)
- Irving Layton Reads His Poetry. Jewish Public Library, c. 1967. (cassette)
- An Evening with Irving Layton. University of Guelph, 1969. (cassette)
- Irving Layton. High Barnet, c. 1972. (cassette)
- Layton. Caedmon, c. 1973. (LP)
- A Red Carpet for the Sun. Trent University, 1975. (cassette)
- An Evening with Irving Layton. Jewish Public Library, 1976. (cassette)
- My Brother Jesus. Saidye Bronfman Centre, 1976. (cassette)
- An Evening with Irving Layton. Jewish Public Library, 1981. (cassette)
- Irving Layton. TV Ontario, 1984. 14 mins. (video cassette)
- A Poetry Reading by Irving Layton. League of Canadian Poets, 1982. (cassette)
- A Wild Peculiar Joy: Selected Poems 1945–82. Toronto: McClelland & Stewart, 1990. (cassette) ISBN 0-7710-4950-1 "There Were No Signs" from A Wild Peculiar Joy, online at CBC Words at Large
- Celebration: Famous Canadian Poets CD Canadian Poetry Association – 2001 ISBN 1-55253-029-9 (with Earle Birney) (CD#1)

Except where noted, discographical information courtesy University of Toronto.

== See also ==
- Canadian literature
- Canadian poetry
- List of Canadian poets
