= Louis Dudek =

Canadian poet, academic, and publisher

- Born: February 6, 1918; Montreal, Quebec
- Died: March 23, 2001 (aged 83); Montreal, Quebec
- Spouse(s): Stephanie Zuperko Dudek, Aileen Collins
- Children: Gregory Dudek
- Writing career
- Language: English
- Notable awards: Order of Canada

Louis Dudek, OC (February 6, 1918 – March 23, 2001) was a Canadian poet, academic, and publisher known for his role in defining Modernism in poetry, and for his literary criticism. He was the author of over two dozen books. In A Digital History of Canadian Poetry, writer Heather Prycz said that "As a critic, teacher and theoretician, Dudek influenced the teaching of Canadian poetry in most [Canadian] schools and universities".

== Life ==
Dudek was born in Montreal, Quebec, the son of Vincent and Stanislawa Dudek, part of an extended Catholic family which had emigrated from Poland, and was raised in that city's East End. He was lean and sickly as a child, which made him introverted and unusually sensitive. His mother died at 31, when he was eight.

Due to the family's financial limitations, Dudek dropped out of the High School of Montreal and went to work in a warehouse until, in 1936, his father was able to send him to college. He entered McGill University in Montreal, where he became a reporter and associate editor for the McGill Daily. He received his BA degree there in 1939.

Dudek went on to become a professor of English Literature at McGill University, a major figure in publishing and criticism, and was eventually recognized by being awarded the Greensheilds Chair as well as the Order of Canada. He had one son with his wife Stephanie, Gregory Dudek, who also became a professor at McGill University.

=== 1940s ===
After graduating, Dudek briefly freelanced in journalism and advertising. He married Stephanie Zuperko on September 16, 1941, with whom he had one son, Gregory Dudek (a professor of computer science and former director of the McGill University School of Computer Science).

During this time Louis Dudek "was prominent among the poets who participated in First Statement (1942-1945), a seminal 'little magazine' in the development of modern Canadian literature." With John Sutherland, the magazine's editor, and poet Irving Layton, he "fought hard to foster a native tradition in poetry and establish new ways of writing in Canada, pioneering a direct style that articulated experience in plain language."

The Dudeks moved to New York City in 1943, where he began graduate studies in journalism and history at Columbia University, and soon changed his major to literature. His doctoral dissertation, Literature and the Press, was published in 1960. After receiving his PhD, he taught at New York's City College.

In New York, Dudek continued to contribute poems to First Statement and its successor, Northern Review. In 1944, some of his poems appeared in the anthology Unit of Five, alongside poetry by Ronald Hambleton, P. K. Page, Raymond Souster and James Wreford. His own first book of poetry, East of the City, was issued by Toronto's Ryerson Press in 1946.

Dudek began corresponding with modernist poet Ezra Pound in 1949, and met Pound in person the next year, who encouraged Dudek to adopt a more cosmopolitan approach to his writing.

=== 1950s ===
By the early 1950s the Dudeks' marriage was ending. He returned to Montreal and joined the Department of English at McGill University in 1951, where he remained for the rest of his life. He became Greenshield Professor of English in 1969, and Professor Emeritus in 1984. His colleague Brian Trehearne remembered him as a "gifted and natural lecturer" who taught "one of the most popular and challenging courses in the history of the Faculty of Arts."

In 1952 Dudek founded Contact Press with Raymond Souster and Irving Layton. Its first book was Cerberus, an anthology by the three of them. Contact Press went on to publish "most of the important Canadian poets of the fifties and sixties." Dudek also worked on the little magazine CIV/n ("Civilation"), founded in 1953 and edited by Aileen Collins.

Dudek published his first long poem, Europe, in 1954.

In 1956 Dudek began the McGill Poetry Series, a series of chapbooks by McGill students published by Contact Press. The first in the series, printed in 1956, was Let Us Compare Mythologies, the first book from Leonard Cohen. In 1957 the series included The Carnal and the Crane, the first book by Daryl Hine.

In 1957 Dudek began Delta, his own poetry magazine, featuring "the work of many promising new poets" until 1966. He bought a press, installed it in his basement, and learned how to run it to print the magazine's early issues, as well as his 1958 book Laughing Stalks. In his own writing he continued to explore the possibilities of long poems, writing Transparent Sea in 1956 and En Mexico in 1958.

Throughout the 1950s Dudek remained "a passionate admirer and defender" of Ezra Pound. His efforts contributed to Pound's release in 1958 from St. Elizabeth's mental hospital, where Pound had been confined since 1946.

=== Later life ===
At odds with literary trends in the early 1960s, Dudek concentrated on teaching and writing his long poem Atlantis (published in 1967). In 1966 he founded Delta Canada Books with Michael Gnarowski and Glen Siebrasse, which published more than 30 titles between 1966 and 1971, including Dudek's Collected Poems (1971).

Dudek married Aileen Collins in 1970. The next year they began DC Books, which they ran until 1986, and which is still in operation.

He wrote a column on books, film and the arts for the Montreal Gazette between 1965 and 1969. "This activity together with his reviews, articles and radio talks has remained fundamental to Dudek's perception of the poet's and the critic's role in society." His collected columns were published in 1988 as In Defence of Art.

Dudek regularly contributed to Canadian academic journals, "and, in keeping with his commitment to literature as part of daily life", made frequent appearances on CBC Radio and in various newspapers as a commentator on arts and culture. The First Person in Literature was originally broadcast as a series of CBC Radio lectures.

He "kept up a lifelong battle against some of the most famous and influential voices in Canadian cultural writing, including Northrop Frye and Marshall McLuhan." Perhaps for that reason, some major awards passed him by.

Dudek always preferred to publish in the small press. "He was incredibly supportive of small publishers and writers," Simon Dardick, publisher of Véhicule Press, said of him. "There are dozens and dozens of writers and publishers who owe him so much. There was such a generosity of spirit there." In return, the small press contained some of his strongest supporters (including Véhicule Press), who continued to release Dudek's books through his lifetime.

Dudek's poetry "was a beacon to three generations of Canadian poets, and among them are names like Daryl Hine and Doug Jones in the '50s, George Bowering and Frank Davey in the '60s, and Ken Norris, Endre Farkas and Peter Van Toorn in the '70s and '80s."

== Writing ==
Dudek began as a realist lyric poet influenced by the Imagists. Unit of Five (1944) shows a style that employs few adverbs and adjectives, as well as direct descriptions. His social impulse is also strong in East of the City (1946), which uses the city as the setting for most of its poems.

Social realism is absent from Dudek´s two next books, Twenty Four Poems (1952) and The Searching Image (1952). The first shows a strong influence of Imagism and its accumulative method. The second shifts drastically towards stylism and artifice with dense and obscure metaphors and elaborate syntax.

His "later poetry, typified by the collection Continuation 1 (1981), harks back to an earlier book, Epigrams (1975), and is an experiment in recording the fragmentary poetic moment."

== Recognition ==
Louis Dudek, a biography by Susan Stromberg-Stein, was published in 1984; and that year, Dudek was invested as a member of the Order of Canada, honouring him as "one of Canada's leading poets, with 25 volumes of verse to his name."

Students, friends, and fellow poets honoured Dudek in 1990 with "a celebrated evening at Ben's Restaurant, where his peers gave him a special Canadian Writers' Award."

In 2006 a German translation of his selected poetry was published at Elfenbein-Verlag, Berlin. In 2001 George Hildebrand edited a critical collection, Louis Dudek: Essays on His Works (Guernica Editions).

== Publications ==
=== Poetry ===
- Unit of Five: Louis Dudek, Ronald Hambleton, P. K. Page, Raymond Souster, James Wreford. Edited by Ronald Hambleton. Toronto: Ryerson Press, 1944.
- East of the City. Toronto: Ryerson Press, 1946.
- Cerberus. By Louis Dudek, Raymond Souster and Irving Layton. Toronto: Contact Press, 1952.
- The Searching Image. Toronto: Ryerson Press, 1952.
- Twenty-Four Poems. Toronto: Contact Press, 1952.
- Europe. Toronto: Laocoön (Contact) Press, 1954. Reprinted: Erin, ON: The Porcupine's Quill, 1991.
- The Transparent Sea. Toronto: Contact Press, 1956.
- En Mexico. Toronto: Contact Press, 1958.
- Laughing Stalks. Toronto: Contact Press, 1958.
- Atlantis. Montreal: Delta Canada, 1967.
- Collected Poetry. Montréal: Delta Canada, 1971.
- Selected Poems. Ottawa: Golden Dog, 1975.
- "Continuation 1". The Tamarack Review 69 (1976).
- Cross-Section: Poems 1940-1980. Toronto: Coach House Press, 1980.
- Poems from Atlantis. Ottawa: Golden Dog, 1981.
- Continuation I. Montréal: Véhicule Press, 1981.
- Zembla´s Rocks. Montreal: Véhicule Press, 1986.
- Infinite Worlds: The Poetry of Louis Dudek. Robin Blaser ed. Montreal: Véhicule Press, 1988.
- Continuation II. Montreal: Véhicule Press, 1990.
- Small Perfect Things. Montreal: DC Books, 1991.
- The Caged Tiger. Montreal: Empyreal Press, 1997.
- The Poetry of Louis Dudek. Ottawa: The Golden Dog, 1998.
- The Surface of Time. Montreal: Empyreal, 2000.
- For You, You/Für Dich, Dir. Elfenbein Verlag, Berlin (English with German translation). Bernhard Beutler ed., 2006.

=== Prose ===
- Literature and the Press: A History of Printing, Printed Media and Their Relation to Literature. Toronto: Ryerson Press and Contact Press, 1960.
- The First Person in Literature. Toronto: CBC Publications, 1967.
- All kinds of Everything: Teacher´s Guide. Toronto: Clarke, 1973.
- Epigrams. Montreal: DC Books, 1975.
- Selected Essays and Criticism. Ottawa: The Tecumseh Press, 1978.
- Technology and Culture: Six Lectures. Ottawa: The Golden Dog Press, 1979.
- Louis Dudek: Texts and Essays, 1981.
- Ideas for Poetry. Montréal: Véhicule Press, 1983.
- In Defense of Art: Critical Essays and Reviews. Aileen Collins ed. Kingston: Quarry Press, 1988.
- Essays on Myth, Art, & Reality. Montréal: Véhicule Press, 1992.
- The Birth of Reason. Montreal: DC Books, 1994.
- Notebooks 1940-1994. Ottawa: Golden Dog Press, 1994.
- 1941 Diary. Aileen Collins ed. Montreal: Empyreal, 1996.
- Reality Games. Montreal: Empyreal, 1998.

=== Edited ===
- Canadian Poems, 1850-1952. Edited by Louis Dudek and Irving Layton. Toronto: Contact Press, 1952.
- The Selected Poems by Raymond Souster. Toronto: Contact Press, 1956.
- Delta: A Magazine of Poetry and Criticism. 1-26 (1957-1966).
- Montreal: Paris of America. Edited by Michel Regnier and Louis Dudek. Toronto: Ryerson Press; Montreal: Editions du Jour, 1961.
- Poetry of Our Time: An Introduction to Twentieth-Century Poetry Including Modern Canadian Poetry. Toronto: Macmillan, 1965.
- The Making of Modern Poetry in Canada: Essential Articles on Contemporary Poetry in English. Edited by Louis Dudek and Michael Gnarowski. Toronto: Ryerson Press, 1967.
- All Kinds of Everything: Worlds of Poetry. Toronto: Clarke Irwin, 1973.
- Dk/ Some Letters of Ezra Pound. Montréal: DC Books, 1974.

=== Fonds ===
- The Dudek archives and many of his papers, known as the Louis Dudek fonds, are stored with Library and Archives Canada (formerly the National Library of Canada).

Except where noted, all bibliographical information courtesy of Canadian Poetry Online.

== Discography ==
- Six Montreal Poets. New York: Folkways Records, 1957. Includes A.J.M. Smith, Leonard Cohen, Irving Layton, F.R. Scott, Louis Dudek, and A.M. Klein.
- The Green Beyond: Poems. Toronto: Canadian Broadcasting Corporation, 1973.
- A Poetry Reading. Toronto: League of Canadian Poets, 1982.

== See also ==
- Canadian literature
- Canadian poetry
- List of Canadian poets
