= The Second Scroll =

Book by A. M. Klein

- First edition
- Author: A. M. Klein
- Publisher: Alfred A. Knopf
- Publication date: 1951
- Pages: 198

The Second Scroll is a 1951 novel by the Jewish-Canadian writer A. M. Klein. Klein's only novel was written after his pilgrimage to the newly founded nation of Israel in 1949. It concerns the quest for meaning in the post-Holocaust world, as an unnamed narrator, a Montreal journalist, editor, poet and Zionist, who traveled to the State of Israel soon after its founding, searches for his long-lost uncle, Melech Davidson, a Holocaust survivor, in post-war Italy, Morocco, and Israel.

Klein's novel parallels the biblical story of the Exodus from Egypt, with the modern Jewish immigration to Israel after the war being compared to the original Exodus story. It is arranged in "books" (Genesis, Exodus, Leviticus, Numbers and Deuteronomy), with each book loosely based on its equivalent from the Torah, and in the Jewish Talmudic tradition, several glosses further the ideas of each book at the end of the novel. The novel incorporates modes from poetry, drama and prayer, and contains elements of metafiction.

The novel's protagonist travels to Israel, seeking "a new revelation of God’s purpose in the world," the "second scroll” of the title, and finds not a new revelation, but a new people being created:

"In the streets, in the shops, everywhere about me I had looked but had not seen. It was all there all the time — the fashioning folk, anonymous and unobserved, creating word by word, phrase by phrase, the total work that when completed would stand as the epic revealed."

According to Cynthia Ozick, The Second Scroll tells of a reborn Israel in language that is “Influenced yet liberated by Joyce, forged in the laboratory of the English language as it exerts all its fathomless force, immersed simultaneously in Bible, Hebrew, Jerusalem and 20th-century history, this prophetically intricate work is the antithesis of what we have come to expect of the so-called — and largely secular — Jewish-American novel. (Think not Roth but Blake.)”

The book was translated into French as Le Second rouleau by Charlotte and Robert Melancon, who won the Quebec Governor General's Award for their translation.
