= William Arthur Irwin =

Canadian journalist and diplomat

W. Arthur Irwin
- Born: William Arthur Irwin; May 27, 1898; Ayr, Ontario
- Died: August 9, 1999 (aged 101); Victoria, British Columbia
- Citizenship: Canadian
- Occupations: Journalist and diplomat
- Spouse: P. K. Page (1916-2010)
- Children: 3

William Arthur Irwin, OC, often credited as W. Arthur Irwin (May 27, 1898 – August 9, 1999), was a Canadian journalist and diplomat. He is best known for his work on Maclean's, a magazine with which he held various positions across a quarter of a century. He also served as the Commissioner of the National Film Board of Canada (NFB), and as Canadian high commissioner or ambassador.

== Life and career ==
Irwin was born in Ayr, Ontario, on 27 May 1898 to Reverend Alexander J. Irwin and Amelia (Hassard). During the First World War he served abroad, before returning to Canada after the end of the conflict to attend the University of Toronto. He became a journalist while still a student, working at The Mail and Empire for $30 a week. He subsequently moved on to The Globe, for which he worked until 1925 when he resigned following criticism from the newspaper's owner about a piece he had written during the 1925 federal election.

The same year, he began working for Maclean's. He was initially the magazine's associate editor, becoming the full editor in 1945, although even before this point he was regarded as being the driving force behind the publication. He is credited with having brought a new generation of Canadian artists and writers to prominence at Maclean's, including Pierre Berton, June Callwood, Trent Frayne and Clyde Gilmour. Irwin was a Canadian nationalist who believed his job at Maclean's was "interpreting Canada to Canadians."

In addition to his journalistic career in this period, during the 1930s he worked with the Canadian Institute of International Affairs. In the 1940s he also began working for the United Nations, an organisation with which he continued to be associated through to the 1960s. In 1948 he suffered a personal loss when his wife Jean, whom he had married shortly after leaving university, died of asthma.

Irwin left Maclean's in February 1950 when he became the Government Film Commissioner, in charge of the National Film Board. He had been recruited to try to restore the Board's public image and combat the perceived threat of communism within the organisation. Some NFB staff were concerned about Irwin's appointment, both because of his complete lack of any experience in the film industry and because Maclean's sister publication, the Financial Post, had made damaging revelations about communist elements in the NFB. However, Irwin made important changes that helped to revive the fortunes of the NFB. He re-wrote the National Film Act, making the organisation independent of government control. He also decided to move the NFB's headquarters from Ottawa to Montreal, believing it would benefit from being away from the capital.

It was also at the NFB that Irwin met his second wife, the writer and poet P. K. Page. She was working as a scriptwriter at the NFB when he arrived there in 1950. She had decided to leave the NFB, and Irwin had initially invited her to dinner to try to persuade her to stay, from which had blossomed a friendship which turned to romance, and they married later the same year. Page later commented that her success as a poet would not have been possible without Irwin's support.

Irwin left the National Film Board in 1953, to take up work for the Department of External Affairs. He served as High Commissioner to Australia, and then as Ambassador to Brazil, Mexico and finally Guatemala before retiring from diplomatic service in 1964. He then worked as publisher of the Times newspaper in Victoria, British Columbia until his retirement in 1971. A biography of Irwin was published in 1993, as well as a lengthy interview at his hundredth birthday in May 1998.

He died in Victoria in 1999, at the age of 101. He was survived by Page and by his three children from his first marriage.

Cultural offices
Preceded by Ross McLean	Government Film Commissioner and Chairperson of the National Film Board of Canada; 1950-1953	Succeeded by Albert Trueman
