= Maimonides Geriatric Centre =

- CIUSSS du Centre-Ouest-de-l'Île-de-Montréal

Geography
- Location: 5795 Caldwell Avenue; Côte Saint-Luc, Quebec, Canada

Organization
- Religious affiliation: Jewish

History
- Former names: Maimonides Hospital and Home for the Aged
- Constructed: 1964
- Opened: 1910

Links
- Website: donaldbermanmaimonides.ca

Donald Berman Maimonides Geriatric Centre (French: Centre gériatrique Maimonides Donald Berman) is a Jewish geriatric care centre in Côte Saint-Luc, a suburb of Montreal, Quebec. It was founded in 1910 as the Hebrew Old People's and Sheltering Home. Maimonides is a member institution of the CIUSSS du Centre-Ouest-de-l'Île-de-Montréal.

== Notable staff ==
- Vojtech Adalbert Kral
