= Ronald Hambleton =

Canadian broadcaster and music critic

- Born: June 9, 1917; Preston, Lancashire, England
- Died: April 10, 2015 (aged 97); Toronto, Ontario, Canada
- Occupations: Broadcaster, music critic

Ronald Hambleton (June 9, 1917 – April 10, 2015) was an English-born Canadian broadcaster and music critic.

== Biography ==
Hambleton was born on June 9, 1917, in Preston, Lancashire, England. He came to Vancouver at 7. He left school in his mid-teens so he could help the family during the Great Depression. Hambleton spent 30 years writing classical music reviews for the Toronto Star. With his wife Jean Elizabeth Hambleton, he had five children. In the last year of his life, he had 11 grandchildren and six great-grandchildren. During his life, he wrote 11 books.
