= A. J. M. Smith =

Canadian poet and anthologist (1902–1980)

A. J. M. Smith FRSC
- Born: Arthur James Marshall Smith; November 8, 1902; Montreal, Quebec, Canada
- Died: November 21, 1980 (aged 78); East Lansing, Michigan, United States
- Education: McGill University; University of Edinburgh
- Occupation: Professor
- Writing career
- Language: English
- Genre: Poetry
- Notable works: The Death of the Phoenix and Other Poems
- Notable awards: Governor General's Award; Lorne Pierce Medal; FRSC
- Movement: Montreal Group

Arthur James Marshall Smith FRSC (November 8, 1902 – November 21, 1980) was a Canadian poet and anthologist. He "was a prominent member of a group of Montreal poets" – the Montreal Group, which included Leon Edel, Leo Kennedy, A. M. Klein, and F. R. Scott — "who distinguished themselves by their modernism in a culture still rigidly rooted in Victorianism."

== Life and Writing ==
Smith was born in Montreal, but lived in England from 1918 to 1920, where he "studied for the Cambridge Local Examinations, 'and failed everything except English and history' (he later wrote)." In England he became aware of contemporary poetry: "he frequented Harold Monroe's bookshop, then the citadel of Georgian poetry, and read much in the recent war poets and the Imagists."

=== Montreal Group ===
Returning to Montreal, Smith entered McGill University in 1921. While an undergraduate there in 1924 he wrote for and co-edited the McGill Daily Literary Supplement; in 1925, as a graduate student, he and F. R. Scott founded the McGill Fortnightly Review, which billed itself as "an independent journal of literature, the arts, and student affairs edited and published by a group of undergraduates at McGill University." The Review was "the first journal to publish modernist poetry and critical opinion in Canada."

"The McGill Fortnightly drew to it other young writers – among them A. M. Klein, Leo Kennedy, and Leon Edel – on whom, as well as on Scott, Smith had an enduring influence."

"While still at McGill," Scott later noted, "Smith had poems accepted by the Dial, then in the last days of its glory as an expounder of new aesthetic values, and which only a few years previously had printed Eliot's Waste Land. Such an honour was a stimulus to our whole group."

Smith received his doctorate from the University of Edinburgh in 1931.

=== New Provinces ===
In various editorial roles, Smith significantly contributed to promoting the poetry of others. With Scott and Kennedy he co-edited the "milestone selection of modernist verse," New Provinces, which was published in 1936 (although Smith's Preface was "rejected by the publisher as being too impatient with traditional Canadian poetry. The 'Rejected Preface' was resurrected in 1964, and was made an important feature of the new edition of New Provinces published in 1976.")

=== Critical success ===
In 1936 Smith became a professor at Michigan State College (now Michigan State University) and taught there until his retirement in 1972. "He became a naturalized American, but spent all his summers in his country place near Magog, Quebec." He became well known as both a scholar and an author of poetry, with many of his best known works focusing on Canadian themes (for example his 1929 poem "The Lonely Land", which was inspired by a 1926 Group of Seven exhibition).

As early as 1939, Smith applied for a Guggenheim Fellowship to support the preparation of an anthology of Canadian poetry. In 1943 his first anthology was published: The Book of Canadian Poetry, in which he argued that there was a distinctive Canadian voice. The book was praised by literary critic Northrop Frye, who called its publication "an important event in Canadian literature. For instead of confining his reading to previous compilations, as most anthologists do, he has made a first-hand study of the whole English field with unflagging industry and unfaltering taste." The Encyclopædia Britannica says that The Book of Canadian Poetry, and Smith's later anthologies, "contributed greatly to the modernization of literary standards in Canada.

== Recognition ==
Smith won the 1943 Governor General's Award for English-language poetry or drama for his own first collection of poetry, News of the Phoenix and Other Poems.

In 1966 the Royal Society of Canada awarded him its Lorne Pierce Medal.

On Smith's retirement in 1972, Michigan State University established the A.J.M. Smith Award, given annually to a noteworthy volume by a Canadian poet.

Smith's poem "The Lonely Land" was set to music by Violet Archer in 1978.

== Publications ==
=== Poetry ===
- News of the Phoenix and Other Poems. Toronto: Ryerson Press, 1943. New York: Coward-McCann, 1943.
- A Sort of Ecstasy. Michigan State College Press, 1954. Toronto: Ryerson Press, 1954.
- Collected Poems. Toronto: Oxford University Press, 1962 .
- Poems New and Collected. Toronto: Oxford U P, 1967.
- The Classic Shade: Selected Poems. Toronto: McClelland & Stewart, 1978. ISBN 0-7710-8213-4
- Complete Poems of A.J.M. Smith. Brian Trehearne ed. London, ON: Canadian Poetry P, 2006. ISBN 978-0-921243-47-2

=== Non-Fiction ===
- "Our Poets." A Sketch of Poetry in the Nineteenth Century. Toronto, 1942.
- The Poetic Process. East Lansing, MI: College of Arts and Sciences, Michigan State University, 1964.
- Essays for College Writing. New York: St. Martin's P, 1965.
- Towards a View of Canadian Letters. Vancouver: U of British Columbia P, 1973.
- On Poetry and Poets. Selected Essays of A.J.M. Smith. Toronto: McClelland & Stewart, 1977.
- Selected Writings. Hamilton: Dundurn (Voyageur classics), 2006.

=== Edited ===
- New Provinces: Poems of Several Authors (with F.R. Scott and Leo Kennedy), Macmillan of Canada, 1936. Reprinted 1976, University of Toronto Press.
- The Book of Canadian PoetryToronto: W.J. Gage & Co., 1943. Chicago: University of Chicago Press, 1943.
- Seven Centuries of Verse, English and American. New York: Charles Scribner's Sons, 1947. Reprinted 1957, 1967.
- The Worldly Muse: An Anthology of Serious Light Verse. New York: Abelard Press, 1951.
- The Blasted Pine: An Anthology of Satire, Invective, and Disrespectful Verse (with F. R. Scott). Toronto: Macmillan of Canada, 1957.
- Masks of Poetry: Canadian Critics on Canadian Verse. Toronto: McClelland & Stewart, 1962.
- Early Beginnings to Confederation. Toronto: W.J. Gage, 1965.
- The Book of Canadian Prose. Toronto: W.J. Gage, 1965.
- 100 Poems. New York: Scribner, 1965. Freeport, NY: Books for Libraries, 1970.
- Modern Canadian Verse in English and French. Toronto: Oxford University Press, 1967.
- The Colonial Century: English-Canadian Writing Before Confederation. Toronto: Gage, 1973.
- The Canadian Century: English-Canadian Writing Since Confederation. Toronto: Gage, 1973.

== Discography ==
- Six Montreal Poets. New York: Folkways Records, 1957. Includes A.J.M. Smith, Leonard Cohen, Irving Layton, F.R. Scott, Louis Dudek, and A.M. Klein. (cassette, 60 mins).
