= John Sutherland (Canadian writer) =

Canadian writer

John Sutherland (21 February 1919 – 1 September 1956) was a Canadian poet, literary critic, and magazine editor based in Montreal, Quebec. Although he published numerous poems of his own, he was perhaps better known as the founder and editor of two important Canadian literary magazines, First Statement and Northern Review. He was the half-brother of actor Donald Sutherland and brother of the painter and poet Betty Sutherland (Boschka Layton, wife of poet Irving Layton).

Before his death from cancer, Sutherland also published the anthology Other Canadians: An Anthology of New Poetry in Canada, 1940–46, a collection of Canadian modernist poetry, and one of the first critical studies of the poetry of E. J. Pratt. Sutherland was also instrumental in exposing the poetry of Irving Layton to a wider audience, thanks to the Sutherland-owned First Statement Press, the small press that issued Layton's first book, Here and Now.

In 1943, Sutherland published a review of Patrick Anderson's poetry in First Statement which suggested homoerotic themes in his writing, and accusing Anderson of "some sexual experience of a kind not normal"; although Anderson would in fact come out as gay later in life, he was married at the time to Peggy Doernbach, and threatened to sue. Sutherland printed a retraction in the following issue. The incident was little known outside of Montreal at the time, as both First Statement and Anderson's rival magazine Preview had small, primarily local circulations, although it would come to be more extensively analyzed in the 1990s as an important incident in the history of LGBT literature in Canada.

Sutherland would also come to be known for an apparent feud with poet A. J. M. Smith, with Other Canadians being perceived as a direct riposte to Smith's anthology The Book of Canadian Poetry.
