= A. M. Klein =

Writer, journalist, lawyer

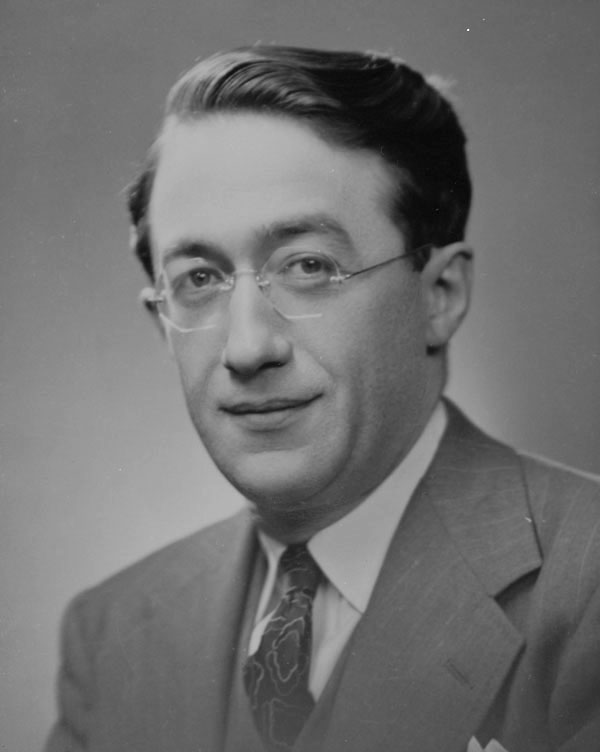
- A. M. Klein in the mid-1940s
- Born: Abraham Moses Klein; 14 February 1909; Ratno, Russian Empire
- Died: 20 February 1972 (aged 63); Montreal, Quebec, Canada
- Education: McGill University; Université de Montréal
- Spouse: Bessie Kozlov (m. 1935; died 1971)
- Children: Sandor, Colman and Sharon
- Writing career
- Genre: Poetry
- Notable works: The Rocking Chair and Other Poems, The Second Scroll
- Notable awards: Governor General's Award (1949); Lorne Pierce Medal (1956)
- Literary movement: Montreal Group

Abraham Moses Klein (14 February 1909 – 20 August 1972) was a Canadian poet, journalist, novelist, short story writer and lawyer. He has been called "one of Canada's greatest poets and a leading figure in Jewish-Canadian culture."

Best known for his poetry, Klein also published one novella entitled The Second Scroll in 1951, along with numerous essays, reviews, and short stories. Many of his lesser-known works, including several unfinished novels, were published posthumously in a series of collections from the University of Toronto Press.

== Life ==
=== Early life and publications ===
Klein was born in Ratno, Ukraine, but in 1910 (at age one), he immigrated with his family to Montreal, Quebec, the city in which he would live most of his life. Ratno had seen a series of pogroms and, like many Ukrainian Jews, Klein's parents sought a safer life elsewhere. As a result of the influx of Jewish immigrants to Montreal, its Jewish community flourished, even though many families lived close to the poverty line. The family of Irving Layton was another notable addition to this community. Klein's father, a devout Orthodox Jew, influenced Klein's early development. The son's early education and literary interests owed much to his plan to become a rabbi when he grew up—a plan he did not fulfill.

Klein attended Baron Byng High School, an institution that would later be immortalized in Mordecai Richler's novel The Apprenticeship of Duddy Kravitz. There he became a friend of David Lewis, future leader of the socialist New Democratic Party. Klein introduced Lewis to his wife, Sophie Carson, when they were all students at Baron Byng. (Lewis later introduced Irving Layton to Klein. Klein became Layton's Latin tutor so he could pass his matriculation exams.)

Klein went on to study political science, classics, and economics as an undergraduate at McGill University. There, he met a group of poets and critics, including F. R. Scott and A. J. M. Smith, who would form the foundations of the so-called Montreal Group of Poets. Klein's first submission of a poem to the Scott and Smith-edited magazine, The McGill Fortnightly Review, was rejected based on its author's refusal to alter the word "soul," which the editors felt was out of step with the modernist principles they espoused. Nevertheless, Klein became friends with the elder poets and was soon an avid modernist. After the Fortnightly Review folded, Klein and Lewis founded The McGilliad magazine at McGill in 1930.

Klein also came under the influence of Montreal Group member Leon Edel, the future Henry James biographer, who introduced Klein to the works of James Joyce and other writers. Klein would add Joyce to his list of lifelong fascinations, an interest that bore fruit in a complex literary study of Joyce's Ulysses, published posthumously in the Klein volume Literary Essays and Reviews.

After McGill, Klein studied law at the Université de Montréal, where instruction was in French. He was a law partner first of Max Garmaise, whom he followed briefly to Rouyn, a small mining development in the North of Quebec. Then, back in Montreal, he joined with Samuel Chait, who was to become the first president of the Federated Zionist Organization of Canada when it was reorganised in 1967. Klein, Garmaise, and Chait were all officers of Young Judea, a Zionist youth organization.

Despite his growing literary interests, Klein's early poetry of the 1920s and 1930s was largely concerned with Jewish themes, including the history of Jews in Western society ("Design for Mediaeval Tapestry"), the importance of religion as a mediating force in modern society ("Heirloom"), and tributes to important figures in Jewish culture ("Out of the Pulver and the Polished Lens," about the philosopher Spinoza). Klein published many of these early works in Canadian and American periodicals, although the Great Depression made it difficult for him to find a publisher willing to accept an entire book. He also published two poems in the 1936 anthology of modernist Canadian poetry, New Provinces.

Belatedly, in 1940, Klein's first monograph, Hath Not a Jew, was published in the United States. Although the book sold poorly, many of its poems would later become standard selections in anthologies of Canadian literature and posthumous collections of Klein's work.

=== Literary maturity and prominence ===
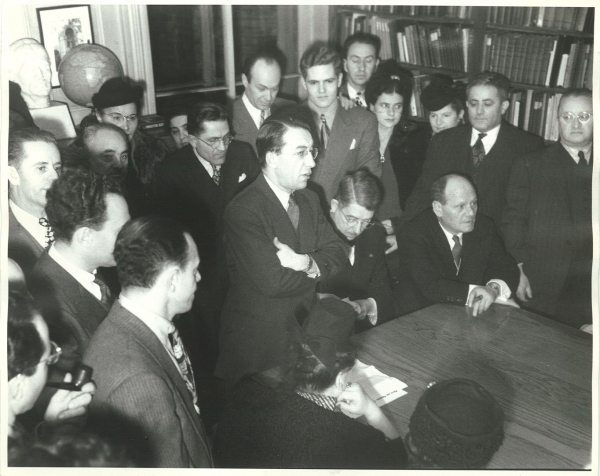
A. M. Klein standing in the Jewish Public Library, Montreal, in 1945

During the Second World War, Klein published two more books, Poems and The Hitleriad, in 1944. Poems developed ideas forecast in Hath Not a Jew but also reflected Klein's anxieties over current events and the plight of Jews in the wake of the Holocaust. Poems such as "Polish Village," "Meditation Upon Survival," and "Elegy" were thoroughly contemporary accounts of persecution and suffering with which Klein, despite his relative safety in Canada, deeply sympathized. The Hitleriad was a very different work, a mock epic written in a satirical style reminiscent of Alexander Pope in such works as The Dunciad. In it, Klein attempted to satirize Adolf Hitler and his Nazi cohorts. However, later critics often noted that the inescapable bitterness of the subject caused Klein's humorous intentions to run awry.

Klein's greatest achievement as a poet came in 1948 with the publication of The Rocking Chair and Other Poems. The book earned Klein a Governor General's Award in poetry and sold in numbers far exceeding the norm for a book of Canadian poetry. The success of the book owed much to Klein's new-found focus on domestic Canadian subjects, particularly the culture of French Canada, which Klein, fluent in French and sympathetic to their minority status in North America, understood better than most English-Canadian writers of his day. Along with the oft-anthologized title poem, "The Rocking Chair," a poem that uses the chair in a rural Quebec house as a synecdoche of French-Canadian heritage, the book included such poems as "Lookout: Mont Royal," "Grain Elevator," and "The Cripples," all of which showed Klein at the height of his creative powers and survived long after as lyrical encapsulations of specific aspects and locations of Montreal. A lengthy elegy at the end of the book, "Portrait of the Poet as Landscape," reflected Klein's indignation at the general indifference of the Canadian public to its own literature.

Klein's mission to Israel in 1949 on behalf of The Canadian Jewish Chronicle inspired his last major work and only complete novel, The Second Scroll. Taking cues equally from James Joyce, the Torah and Talmud, and the events of recent history, Klein structured his novel as a series of five chapters, from Genesis to Deuteronomy, each of which corresponds to one of the five books of the Pentateuch. The story's narrator, an unnamed character based loosely on Klein himself, goes in search of his long-lost uncle, Melech Davidson, a Holocaust survivor who drifts to Rome and then Casablanca before immigrating to Israel. Just as the narrator is about to catch up to his mercurial uncle, Davidson is murdered by a group of Arabs, leaving the end of the novel open as to whether Davidson was a martyr to the Jewish nation or a false Messiah whose heroic status was inflated by his nephew's eagerness to meet his elusive uncle. Following the main narrative of The Second Scroll is a series of numbered glosses that add further commentary to the narrative in the form of poems, a liturgy, a playlet, and, most notably, a meditative essay on the ceiling of the Sistine Chapel painted by Michelangelo. Although The Second Scroll was not a commercial success in its first edition from Knopf in New York City, a subsequent re-print in Canada's New Canadian Library ensured its survival as one of the significant works of modern Canadian literature.

=== Klein as a public figure ===
Aside from his writing, Klein was also an important member of the Montreal Jewish community during his lifetime. By profession, he was a lawyer and spent many years as a consultant and speechwriter for Samuel Bronfman, owner of the Seagram distillery. He was editor of the Canadian Jewish Chronicle from 1932 until 1955, a periodical to which he also contributed articles on such subjects as the rise of Nazism in Germany, the social position of Jews in Canada, and the founding of the state of Israel in 1948. In 1949, Klein ran unsuccessfully for the Canadian Parliament as a member of the Co-operative Commonwealth Federation. Increasing mental illness in the following years led to a suicide attempt and hospitalisation in 1952. In 1956, he was awarded the Lorne Pierce Medal by the Royal Society of Canada, but by then he had a complete mental breakdown. He lapsed into the mysterious silence that saw him give up writing altogether and become a recluse in his home in Montreal's Outremont district, until his death in 1972.

== Legacy ==
The Canadian Encyclopedia states that "Klein has rightly been called the 'first contributor of authentic Jewish poetry to the English language.' His writings articulate the feelings of a generation that witnessed the destruction of European Jewry and the fulfillment of the Zionist dream."

Fellow Jewish-Montrealer Leonard Cohen was an admirer who cited Klein as an influence and had written a couple of poems as well as a song, "To a Teacher," in Klein's memory. Mordecai Richler is said to have used Klein as a model for the character L. B. Berger in Solomon Gursky Was Here (1989). He is honoured posthumously through the A. M. Klein Prize for Poetry, presented by the Quebec Writers' Federation. A play inspired by the poems and life of Klein was produced by Tableau D'Hôte Theatre and presented at the Segal Centre for Performing Arts in Montréal in February 2009.

Klein was designated a Person of National Historic Significance by the federal government in 2007, and a plaque reflecting that status from the national Historic Sites and Monuments Board was unveiled in Montreal on November 19, 2017. Klein's papers are preserved in the National Library and Archives Canada, Ottawa.

== Publications ==
=== Published during Klein's lifetime ===
- New Provinces: Poems of Various Authors (one of six authors in collection) Toronto: Macmillan, 1936.
- Hath Not a Jew.... New York, Behrman Jewish Book House, 1940.
- Poems. Philadelphia: Jewish Publication Society of America, 1944.
- The Hitleriad. Norfolk, CT.: New Directions, 1944.
- Seven Poems. Montreal: The Author, 1947?.
- The Rocking Chair and Other Poems. Toronto: Ryerson Press, 1948.
- The Second Scroll. New York: A. A. Knopf, 1951.

=== Published posthumously ===
- The Collected Poems of A. M. Klein. Toronto; New York: McGraw-Hill Ryerson, 1974.
- Beyond Sambation: Selected Essays and Editorials. Toronto: University of Toronto Press, 1982.
- Short Stories. Toronto: University of Toronto Press, 1983.
- Poesie. Roma [Italy]: Bulzoni, 1984.
- The Second Scroll. Marlboro, VT: Marlboro Press, 1985.
- Literary Essays and Reviews Toronto: University of Toronto Press, 1987.
- Doctor Dwarf and Other Poems for Children. Kingston, ON: Quarry Press, 1990.
- Complete Poems. Toronto: University of Toronto Press, 1990.
- Notebooks: Selections From the A. M. Klein Papers. Toronto: University of Toronto Press, 1994.
- Selected Poems. Seymour Mayne, Zailig Pollock, Usher Caplan, eds. Toronto: University of Toronto Press, 1997.

Except where noted, bibliographical information courtesy of Canadian Poetry Online.

== Discography ==
- Six Montreal Poets. New York: Folkways Records, 1957. Includes A. J. M. Smith, Leonard Cohen, Irving Layton, F. R. Scott, Louis Dudek, and A. M. Klein. (cassette, 60 mins).
