= F. R. Scott =

Canadian legal scholar and poet (1899–1985)

F. R. Scott CC QC FRSC FBA
- Born: Francis Reginald Scott; August 1, 1899; Quebec City, Quebec, Canada
- Died: January 30, 1985 (aged 85); Montreal, Quebec, Canada
- Other name: Frank Scott
- Political party: Co-operative Commonwealth Federation; New Democratic Party
- Spouse: Marian Dale Scott (m. 1928)
- Children: Peter Dale Scott
- Parent: Frederick George Scott
- Awards: Lorne Pierce Medal (1962); Molson Prize (1965–1966); Governor General's Award (1977; 1981)
- Writing career
- Language: English
- Genre: Poetry
- Notable work: Collected Poems of F. R. Scott (1981)
- Movement: Montreal Group

Academic background
- Education: Bishop's University; Magdalen College, Oxford; McGill University
- Influences: H. A. Smith; R. H. Tawney

Academic work
- Discipline: Law; political science
- Sub-discipline: Constitutional law
- School or tradition: Christian socialism
- Institutions: McGill University
- Notable students: Francisco Cuevas Cancino; Layton Fergusson; Ismail Suny
- Notable works: Essays on the Constitution (1977)

Francis Reginald Scott CC QC FRSC FBA (August 1, 1899 – January 30, 1985), commonly known as Frank Scott or F. R. Scott, was a lawyer, Canadian poet, intellectual, and constitutional scholar. He helped found the first Canadian social democratic party, the Co-operative Commonwealth Federation, and its successor, the New Democratic Party. He won Canada's top literary prize, the Governor General's Award, twice, once for poetry and once for non-fiction. He was married to artist Marian Dale Scott.

== Life and work ==
Scott was born on August 1, 1899, in Quebec City, the sixth of seven children. His father was Frederick George Scott, "an Anglican priest, minor poet and staunch advocate of the civilizing tradition of imperial Britain, who instilled in his son a commitment to serve mankind, a love for the regenerative balance of the Laurentian landscape and a firm respect for the social order." He witnessed the riots in the city during the Conscription Crisis of 1917.

Completing his undergraduate studies at Bishop's University, in Lennoxville, Quebec, Scott went to Magdalen College, Oxford, as a Rhodes Scholar and was influenced by the Christian socialist ideas of R. H. Tawney and the Student Christian Movement.

Scott returned to Canada, settled in Montreal, studied law at McGill University, and eventually joined the law faculty as a professor. While at McGill, Scott became a member of the Montreal Group of modernist poets, a circle that also included Leon Edel, John Glassco, and A. J. M. Smith. Scott and Smith became lifelong friends. Scott contributed to the McGill Daily Literary Supplement, which Smith edited; when that folded in 1925, he and Smith founded and edited the McGill Fortnightly Review. After the Review folded, Scott helped found and briefly co-edited The Canadian Mercury. Scott, assisted by Smith and Leo Kennedy, also anonymously edited the modernist poetry anthology New Provinces (in which he published ten poems), which was published in 1936.

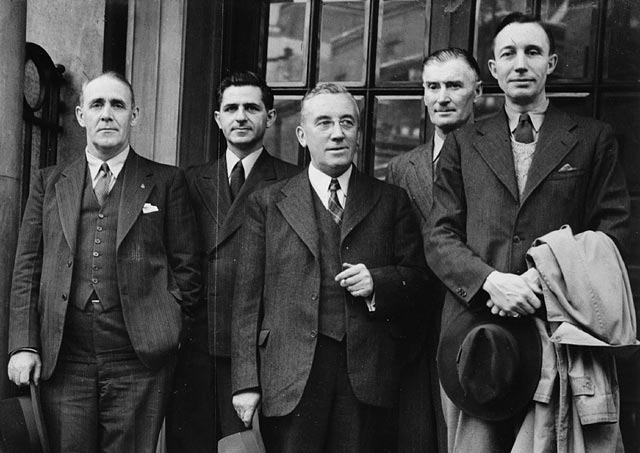
Co-operative Commonwealth Federation delegation attending the September 1944 Conference of Commonwealth Labour Parties in London, England. Pictured from Left to right: Clarie Gillis, MP for Cape Breton South; David Lewis, National Secretary; M. J. Coldwell, National Leader, MP for Rosetown—Biggar; Percy E. Wright, MP for Melfort; and Frank Scott, National Chairman.

The Great Depression greatly disturbed Scott; he founded the League for Social Reconstruction (LSR) with the historian Frank Underhill to advocate socialist solutions in a Canadian context. Through the LSR, Scott became an influential figure in the Canadian socialist movement. He was a founding member of the Co-operative Commonwealth Federation (CCF) and a contributor to that party's Regina Manifesto. He also edited a book advocating Social Planning for Canada (1935). In 1943, he co-authored Make This Your Canada, which spelled out the CCF national programme, with David Lewis. Scott was elected national chairman of the CCF in 1942, and would serve until 1950.

In March 1942 Scott co-founded a literary magazine, Preview, with the Montreal poet Patrick Anderson. Like the earlier Montreal Group publications, "Preview's orientation was cosmopolitan; its members looked largely towards the English poets of the 1930s for inspiration."

In 1950–1951, Scott cofounded Recherches sociales, a study group concerned with French–English relations. He began translating French-Canadian poetry.

In 1952, he served as a United Nations technical assistance resident representative in Burma to help build a socialist state in that country.

During the 1950s, Scott was an active opponent of the Maurice Duplessis regime in Quebec and went to court to fight the Padlock Law. He also represented Frank Roncarrelli, a Jehovah's Witness, in Roncarelli v Duplessis all the way to the Supreme Court of Canada, a battle that Duplessis lost.

Scott began translating French-Canadian poetry and published Anne Hébert and Saint-Denys Garneau in 1962. He edited Poems of French Canada (1977), which won the Canada Council prize for translation.

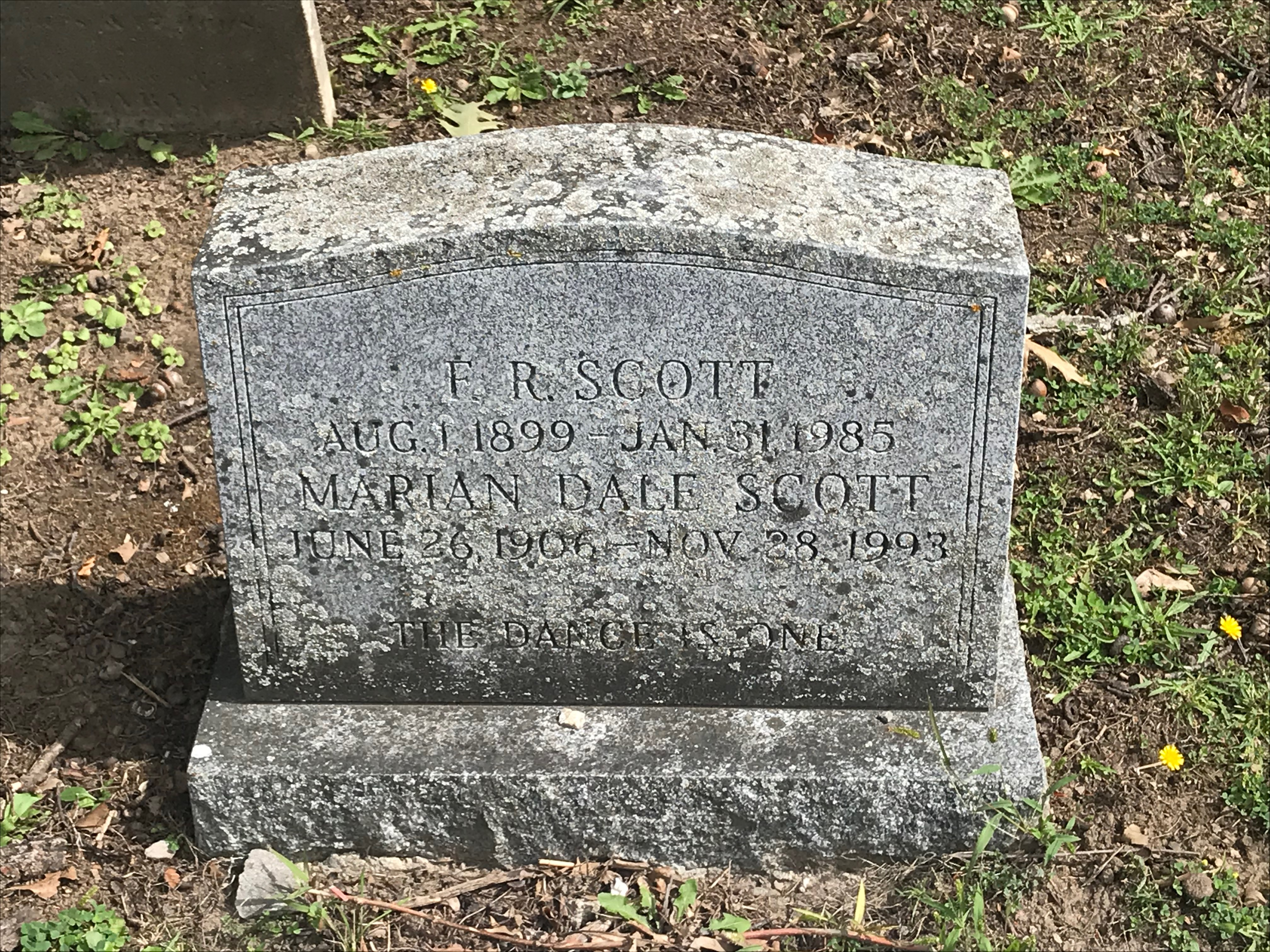
Scott's funeral monument in Mount Royal Cemetery

Scott served as dean of law at McGill University from 1961 to 1964 and served on the Royal Commission on Bilingualism and Biculturalism. In 1970. he was offered a seat in the Senate of Canada by Pierre Trudeau. Although he declined the appointment, he supported Trudeau's imposition of the War Measures Act during the October Crisis same year.

Scott opposed Quebec's Bill 22 and Bill 101, which established the province within its jurisdiction as an officially-unilingual province within an officially-bilingual country.

After his death on January 30, 1985, Scott was interred in Mount Royal Cemetery, Montreal.

=== Recognition ===
Scott won the 1977 Governor General's Award for non-fiction for his Essays on the Constitution and the 1981 Governor General's Award for poetry for his Collected Poems.

The Royal Society of Canada elected Scott a fellow in 1947 and awarded him its Lorne Pierce Medal in 1962.

Scott won the Molson Prize in 1965.

In 1966, Scott received an honorary doctorate from Sir George Williams University, which later became Concordia University.

Leonard Cohen added music to Scott's villanelle, "A Villanelle for Our Time," and recorded it on his album Dear Heather.

Scott is the subject of a number of critical works, as well as a major biography, The Politics of the Imagination: A Life of F. R. Scott by Sandra Djwa.

== Publications ==
=== Poetry ===
- Overture. Toronto: Ryerson Press, 1945.
- Events and Signals. Toronto: Ryerson Press, 1954.
- The Eye of the Needle: Satire, Sorties, Sundries. Montreal: Contact Press, 1957.
- Signature. Vancouver: Klanak Press, 1964.
- Selected Poems. Toronto: Oxford University Press, 1966.
- Trouvailles: Poems from Prose. Montreal: Delta Canada, 1967.
- The Dance Is One. Toronto: McClelland and Stewart, 1973.
- The Collected Poems of F. R. Scott. Toronto: McClelland and Stewart, 1981.

=== Translations ===
- St-Denys Garneau & Anne Hebert: Translations/Traductions. Translated by F. R. Scott. Vancouver: Klanak Press, 1962.
- Poems of French Canada. Translated by F. R. Scott. Burnaby, BC: Blackfish Press, 1977.

Except where indicated, bibliographical information on poetry courtesy of Canadian Poetry Online.

=== Non-fiction ===
- Social Reconstruction and the B.N.A. Act – 1934
- Labour Conditions in the Men's Clothing Industry – 1935 (with H. M. Cassidy)
- Social Planning for Canada – 1935.
- Canada Today: A Study of Her National Interests and National Policy – 1938
- Canada's Role in World Affairs – 1942
- Make This Your Canada: A Review of C.C.F. History and Policy – 1943 (with David Lewis)
- Cooperation for What? United States and British Commonwealth – 1944
- The World War Against Poverty – 1953 (with R. A. MacKay and A. E. Ritchie)
- What Does Labour Need in a Bill of Rights – 1959
- The Canadian Constitution and Human Rights – 1959
- Civil Liberties and Canadian Federalism – 1959
- Dialogue sur la traduction – 1970 (with Anne Hebert)
- Essays on the Constitution: Aspects of Canadian Law and Politics – 1977
- Scott, Frank R. (1986). A New Endeavour: Selected Political Essays, Letters, and Addresses. Edited and introduced by Michiel Horn. Toronto: University of Toronto Press. ISBN 0-8020-5672-5.

=== Edited ===
- New Provinces: Poems of Several Authors (with A. J. M. Smith and Leo Kennedy). Toronto: Macmillan, 1936.
- The Blasted Pine: An Anthology of Satire, Invective and Disrespectful Verse – 1957 (with A. J. M. Smith)

== Discography ==
- Six Montreal Poets. New York: Folkways Records, 1957. Includes A. J. M. Smith, Leonard Cohen, Irving Layton, F. R. Scott, Louis Dudek, and A. M. Klein. (cassette, 60 mins)
- Canadian Poets on Tape. Toronto: Ontario Institute for Studies in Education, 1969, 1971. (cassette, 30 mins)
- A Poetry Reading. Toronto: League of Canadian Poets, 1982. (cassette, 60 mins)
- Celebration: Famous Canadian Poets CD London, Ontario: Canadian Poetry Association — 1999 ISBN 1-55253-022-1 (CD#4) (with James Reaney )

Except where noted, discographical information courtesy Canadian Poetry Online.

== See also ==
- List of Bishop's College School alumni

Party political offices
Preceded by M. J. Coldwell	National Chairman of the Co-operative Commonwealth Federation; 1942–1950	Succeeded by Percy Wright
Academic offices
Preceded by Maxwell Cohen	Dean of Law at McGill University; 1961–1964	Succeeded by Maxwell Cohen
Awards
Preceded by Robertson Davies	Lorne Pierce Medal; 1962	Succeeded by Léo-Paul Desrosiers
Preceded by Donald Creighton	Molson Prize; 1965–1966; With: Jean Gascon	Succeeded by Georges-Henri Lévesque
Preceded by Alain Grandbois	Molson Prize; 1965–1966; With: Jean Gascon	Succeeded by Hugh MacLennan
