= Canadian poetry =

Poetry from Canada

Canadian poetry is poetry of or typical of Canada. The term encompasses poetry written in Canada or by Canadian people in the official languages of English and French, and an increasingly prominent body of work in both other European and Indigenous languages.

Although English Canadian poetry began to be written soon after European colonization began, many of English-speaking Canada’s first celebrated poets come from the Confederation period of the mid to late 19th century. In the 20th century, Anglo-Canadian poets embraced European and American poetic innovations, such as Modernism, Confessional poetry, Postmodernism, New Formalism, Concrete and Visual poetry, and Slam, but always turned to a uniquely Canadian perspective.

The minority French Canadian poetry, primarily from Quebec, blossomed in the 19th century, moving through Modernism and Surrealism in the 20th century, to develop a unique voice filled with passion, politics and vibrant imagery.

Montreal, with its exposure to both English and French poetry, became a hotbed of poetic progress with movements such as the Montreal Group and Les Automatistes, and notable poets such as Irving Layton and Leonard Cohen. Toronto (centered on the Bohemian Embassy Coffee House and bpNichol’s grOnk) and Vancouver (with the Downtown Poets and the TISH group) also developed as important poetry centers.

In the later 20th century, a growing awareness of Native identity coupled with the struggle for Indigenous rights, fostered the growth of writing by Native Canadians.

== English-Canadian poetry ==
=== Beginnings ===
The earliest works of poetry, mainly written by visitors, described the new territories in optimistic terms, mainly targeted at a European audience. One of the first works was Robert Hayman's Quodlibets, composed in Newfoundland and published in 1628.

With the growth of English language communities near the end of the 18th century, poetry aimed at local readers began to appear in local newspapers. These writings were mainly intended to reflect the prevailing cultural values of the time and were modeled after English poetry of the same period.

Oliver Goldsmith's long poem The Rising Village appeared in 1825. It was a response to The Deserted Village by his namesake and great-uncle Oliver Goldsmith.

In the first half of the 19th century, poetic works began to reflect local subjects. Acadia by Joseph Howe and The Saint Lawrence and the Saguenay by Charles Sangster are examples of this trend. Early nationalistic verses were composed by writers including Thomas D'Arcy McGee. Many "regional" poets also espoused the British political and aesthetic jingoism of the period. For example, High Tory loyalist & occasional poet Thomas H. Higginson of Vankleek Hill, Ontario, produced paeans to Sir Francis Bond Head (Wm. Lyon Mackenzie's opponent) and the British war effort in the Crimea (such as Sonnet to Florence Nightingale and others), while producing some interesting nature verse exemplifying the all-pervasive influence of Wordsworth's view of nature and the sublime.

In 1857, Charles Heavysege attracted international (British and American) attention for his verse drama Mari na de Saul.

=== Confederation ===
The first book of poetry published in Canada following the formation of the new Dominion of Canada in 1867 was Dreamland by Charles Mair (1868).

A group of poets now known as the "Confederation Poets", including Charles G. D. Roberts, Archibald Lampman, Bliss Carman, Duncan Campbell Scott, and William Wilfred Campbell, came to prominence in the 1880s and 1890s. Choosing the world of nature as their inspiration, their work was drawn from their own experiences and, at its best, written in their own tones. Isabella Valancy Crawford, Frederick George Scott, Francis Sherman, and Annie Campbell Huestis are also sometimes associated with this group.

During this period, E. Pauline Johnson and William Henry Drummond were writing popular poetry - Johnson's based on her part-Mohawk heritage, and Drummond, the Poet of the Habitant, writing dialect verse.

=== Early 20th century ===
In 1907 Robert W. Service's Songs of a Sourdough, Kipling-type verse about the Klondike Gold Rush, became enormously popular: the book would go on to sell more than three million copies in the 20th century. His success would be inspired many other poets, such as Tom MacInnes.

Marjorie Pickthall received much critical attention in this period. In 1915, John McCrae, serving as a surgeon in the Canadian Army, wrote the famous war poem "In Flanders Fields".

After the war, in Newfoundland, E. J. Pratt described the struggle to make a living from the sea in poems about maritime life and the history of Canada; while in central Canada, poets such as Ralph Gustafson and Raymond Knister were moving away from traditional verse forms.

During the 1920s and 1930s, the Montreal Group (a circle of young poets which included A.J.M. Smith, A.M. Klein, and F. R. Scott) helped inspire the development of modernist poetry in Montreal through the McGill Fortnightly Review and the 1936 anthology New Provinces. The "new poetry" valued intellect over sentimentality, or as some have put it, logic over human emotions. Under the literary editorship of Earle Birney, the Canadian Forum helped promote similar developments in Toronto. Dorothy Livesay, born in Manitoba, was an important contributor to the Toronto movement.

The Maritimes remained a holdout for traditional verse. The Song Fishermen of Halifax were a magnet for new poetic talent in the late 1920s due to having Bliss Carman and Charles G.D. Roberts as members. The most notable of the new poets were the sonneteers Kenneth Leslie and Robert Norwood.

The Canadian Poetry Magazine was founded by Pelham Edgar of the Canadian Authors Association in 1936. Traditional verse was what sold in Canada all through this period; and it was what Canadian Poetry Magazine emphasized. Wilson MacDonald was a top selling Canadian poet of the time.

=== Post-war ===
Following World War II, a new breed of poets appeared, writing for a well-educated audience. These included James Reaney, Jay Macpherson and Leonard Cohen. Meanwhile, some maturing authors such as Irving Layton, Raymond Souster, and Louis Dudek, moved in a different direction, adopting colloquial speech in their work.

In the 1960s, a renewed sense of nation helped foster new voices: Margaret Atwood, Michael Ondaatje, Leonard Cohen, Alden Nowlan Eli Mandel and Margaret Avison. Others such as Al Purdy, Milton Acorn, and Earle Birney, already published, produced some of their best work during this period.

The late 1960s and early 1970s saw greater experimentation from poets such as bpNichol, Lionel Kearns, David UU, Joe Rosenblatt, Steve McCaffery, Judith Copithorne and bill bissett. The TISH Poetry movement in Vancouver brought about poetic innovation from Jamie Reid, George Bowering, Fred Wah, Frank Davey, Daphne Marlatt, and David Cull.

Since the 1990s, several Governor General's Award-winning poets, in particular Jan Zwicky and Tim Lilburn, have been engaged in nonfiction writing that maps the relationships between poetry and philosophy. Zwicky's "Lyric Philosophy" and "Wisdom and Metaphor", as well as Lilburn's collection "Thinking and Singing", are representative works.

A younger generation of Canadian poets has been expanding the boundaries of originality: Brian Brett, Ken Babstock, Karen Solie, Lynn Crosbie, Patrick Lane, Stuart Ross, Sonnet L'Abbé, George Elliott Clarke and Barry Dempster have all imprinted their unique consciousnesses onto the map of Canadian imagery.

A notable anthology of Canadian poetry is The New Oxford book of Canadian Verse, edited by Margaret Atwood (ISBN 0-19-540450-5).

=== Literary prizes ===
Notable literary prizes for English Canadian poetry include the Governor General's Awards, the Griffin Poetry Prize, the Gerald Lampert Award, and the Pat Lowther Award.

=== Uniquely Canadian forms ===
==== Jackpine Sonnet ====
The Jackpine Sonnet is a form devised by Milton Acorn, designed to be as irregular and spikey (and Canadian) as a jack pine tree, but with internal structure and integrity. Of no fixed length and with erratic line lengths, the Jackpine Sonnet depends on interweaving internal rhymes, assonance and occasional end-rhymes.

==== Mirelle ====
Tom MacInnes reportedly invented "a five-line stanza of his own he called the 'mirelle'."

==== Viator ====
The Viator poem form was invented by British author and poet Robin Skelton. It consists of any stanzaic form in which the first line of the first stanza is the second line of the second stanza and so on until the poem ends with the line with which it began. (Note: An unpublished example of the Viator is included below to illustrate how the line travels through the poem, its repetition adding weight to the process described. The repeating line is highlighted in boldface type. Shallot Confiture by Russell Collier It's care in cooking slow and carefully that turns a shallot glistening golden brown; in salted water first you must weigh down the scalded bulbs to meet this recipe. Boil vinegar and sugary spices; it's care in cooking slow and carefully the syruped shallots, gradually, then overnight, you'll rest the shallot slices. Then two days more, you'll slow repeat your patient simmering, calmly, gently; it's care in cooking slow and carefully that yields your shallots clear and sweet. By fourth day, time to lift them free, to pack them in that savoury sauce, preserve that silky, golden gloss; it's care in cooking slow and carefully.) The term, Viator comes from the Latin for traveller. An example of Skelton's form may be found in his reference book, The Shapes of our Singing, and is entitled Dover Beach Revisited.

== French-Canadian poetry ==
=== Early verse ===
The first book written in verse by a Canadian was Épîtres, Satires, Chansons, Épigrammes et Autres Pièces de vers by Michel Bibaud, published in 1830.

=== Mouvement littéraire ===
A group of French-speaking poets and authors belonging to the Mouvement littéraire came to Ottawa from Quebec City when the civil service moved to Ottawa in 1870. This group included Alfred Garneau, Antoine Gerin-Lajoie, Achilles Frechette and others. They are considered some of the most important poets and writers in 19th Century French Canada.

=== End of 19th century ===
Octave Crémazie is considered the father of French Canadian poetry. His poetry and that of his follower Louis Fréchette are romantic of form and patriotic in inspiration. At the same time, Pamphile Le May was writing intimist poetry about the simple farm life and Alfred Garneau wrote his feelings.

=== The Montreal School ===
L'École littéraire de Montréal was not a literary school but a group of poets that met regularly. In reaction to the earlier following of the romantic Victor Hugo, they took later schools (such as the Parnassian or symbolism) as their masters. The group included Émile Nelligan, a young poet who stopped writing at only 19 years of age due to mental illness.

=== The terroir ===
Outside Montreal, other poets, such as Nérée Beauchemin (1850–1931) continued Pamphile Le May's depiction of the life of the habitants, followed by Alfred Desrochers (1901–1978), a precursor to the "pays" school of poetry of Gaston Miron.

In 1937, Hector de Saint-Denys Garneau published the first book of modernist poetry in French Canada, Regards et Jeux dans l'espace. Garneau's reputation increased in the 1950s after publication of his Complete Poems (1949) - as would that of his cousin, poet Anne Hébert (1916–2000).

=== Surrealism ===
In 1944, Surrealist André Breton travelled to Québec, where he wrote Arcane 17. His visit had a profound effect on Québec literature and provided the impetus for the first Surrealist poetry published in Canada, Les Sables du rêve (The Sands of Dream) by Thérèse Renaud, with drawings by Jean-Paul Mousseau, published by Les Cahiers de la files indienne in 1946.

This was followed by the formation of Les Automatistes movement, a militant group of poets, painters and dancers, and the Surrealist-inspired manifesto Refus Global of 1948. A strong Surrealist influence continued in Québec, culminating in the work of poets Paul-Marie Lapointe and Claude Gauvreau.

== See also ==
- Alberta Poetry Yearbook
- Canadian Gaelic
- Dusty Owl, poetry collective
- The Four Horsemen (poetry)
- Irish language in Newfoundland
- List of Canadian poets
- League of Canadian Poets
- Uvavnuk
