= Princess Diana's Revenge =

2006 novel by Michael de Larrabeiti

- Author: Michael de Larrabeiti
- Cover artist: Michael de Larrabeiti / Sam Harris
- Language: English
- Genre: Novel
- Publisher: Tallis House
- Publication date: 2006
- Publication place: United Kingdom
- Media type: Print (Paperback & Hardback)
- Pages: 200 pp (Paperback); 196 pp (Hardback)
- ISBN: 1-84728-413-2

Princess Diana's Revenge is a novel written by the English writer Michael de Larrabeiti and self-published in 2006, under the imprint "Tallis House", which is the name used by de Larrabeiti for publishing his own works. In the context of de Larrabeiti's other works, it is perhaps closest in tone to his thrillers The Bunce and The Hollywood Takes, dealing with conspiracy theories and partly featuring the documentary film business in which de Larrabeiti's earlier novels were set. Despite de Larrabeiti being an established author of thirty years' standing, Princess Diana's Revenge was turned down by his literary agents, Curtis Brown. The novel was then turned down by over thirty publishers in the United Kingdom. In response to this de Larrabeiti decided to self-publish under his own imprint, "Tallis House". He is one of the first established authors to self-publish, along with the Canadian writer Jim Munroe.

The book tells the story of Joe Rapps, a director and cameraman who slips into the surreal world of Milton Magna, an Oxfordshire village which is based on the real village of Great Milton where de Larrabeiti lived for over thirty years. Rapps is drawn into various conspiracy theories revolving around the Friends of Diana, a cult which has grown up around the memory of Diana, Princess of Wales, and is determined to avenge her death in a car crash in Paris on 31 August 1997. Although the book is not as explicitly anti-authoritarian as de Larrabeiti's most famous work, The Borrible Trilogy, its satire of members of the royal family ensure that the book is run-through with the anti-authoritarianism that is present in all of de Larrabeiti's work.

== Premise ==
The novel's central character is Joe Rapps, a director-cameraman. At the start of the novel, Rapps is released from Wandsworth prison, where he was imprisoned for accidentally killing two children while driving drunk. The novel is a thriller featuring a plot involving a mysterious woman in white who shoots canines, an atheist bishop, an academic suspected of having sex with a slew of Norland nannies then burying them in churchyard graves, a Russian countess hellbent on avenging Diana's death on 31 August 1997 and a stand-in who takes Prince Charles's place without anyone becoming the wiser.
