= Special Patrol Group =

Former unit of the London police

The Special Patrol Group (SPG) was a unit of Greater London's Metropolitan Police Service, responsible for providing a centrally based mobile capacity to combat serious public disorder, crime, and terrorism, that could not be dealt with by local divisions.

The SPG was active from 1961 to 12 January 1987. It was replaced by the Territorial Support Group (TSG), three times the size of the SPG.

== History ==
The SPG recruited experienced police officers capable of working as disciplined teams, either in uniform or in plain clothes preventing public disorder, targeting areas of serious crime, carrying out stop and searches, and providing a response to terrorist threats. It also conducted its own surveillance and was tasked with reducing burglaries. It had a dedicated radio channel and a fleet of vans to allow it to work independently of routine divisions.

The SPG originally consisted of four units based throughout London. This was increased to six and finally to eight. Each unit comprised an inspector, three sergeants and thirty constables.

Its position within the Metropolitan Police was unusual: whereas the Flying Squad became the symbol of the Criminal Investigation Department in London, the SPG became recognised as a unit that efficient uniformed officers could aspire to join. As such it had an exceptionally high level of esprit de corps.

Other police forces outside London created their own versions of the Special Patrol Group. Greater Manchester Police created the Tactical Aid Group (TAG) in 1977. Merseyside Police formed the Task Force in 1974, which was disbanded in 1978 and replaced with the Operational Support Division (OSD). There was also a Special Patrol Group in Northern Ireland.

== Controversy ==
One of the SPG's most controversial incidents came in 1979, while officers were policing a protest by the Anti-Nazi League in Southall. During a running battle, demonstrator Blair Peach was struck on the head, which caused his death; at the time it was alleged to have been an action of the SPG. In the inquiries that followed, unauthorised weapons were found in lockers kept as souvenirs by SPG officers at one of their bases after the weapons were seized; these included knives, crowbars and sledgehammers.

No SPG officer was ever charged with the attack. An internal report was leaked, which stated that the Metropolitan Police settled with Peach's family out of court. The original Metropolitan police report, eventually officially published on 27 April 2010, concluded that the fatal blow that killed the anti-racism activist was probably made by a police officer. It is thought that "Peach's skull was crushed with an unauthorised weapon, such as a lead-weighted cosh or police radio" The internal report also concluded that some officers had conspired to cover up the circumstances of the special-needs teacher's death and strongly recommended that proceedings be taken against three officers for attempting or conspiracy to pervert the course of justice.

== In popular culture ==
Nick Lowe referred to the Special Patrol Group in the song "Half a Boy and Half a Man", on his album Nick Lowe and His Cowboy Outfit (1984).

In the BBC sitcom The Young Ones (1982–84), the character Vyvyan Basterd's pet hamster was named "Special Patrol Group".

The second book of The Borrible Trilogy novels, The Borribles Go For Broke by Michael de Larrabeiti, features a parody of the SPG in the form of the "Special Borribles Group", or SBG, led by the book's villain, the fictional Inspector Sussworth.

The Exploited and Red Alert both have songs named "S.P.G.", on the albums Punks Not Dead (1981) and We've Got The Power (1983), respectively.

The Linton Kwesi Johnson song "Reggae fi Peach", on the album Bass Culture (1980), includes the refrain: "The SPG them are murderers (murderers) / We can't make them get no furtherer".

In the Not the Nine O'Clock News Racist Police sketch, Constable Savage is transferred to the SPG.

The song "Little Boys in Blue" by the punk band The Professionals includes the lyric "Special Patrol, License to kill".
