= The Borribles =

1976 book

- Author: Michael de Larrabeiti
- Cover artist: Walter Velez
- Genre: Fantasy literature
- Publisher: Tor Books
- Publication date: 1976
- Media type: Print (Paperback)
- Pages: 214 pages
- ISBN: 076535005X
- Followed by: The Borribles Go For Broke

The Borribles (occasionally known as The Borribles: The Great Rumble Hunt) is the first book in Michael de Larrabeiti's The Borrible Trilogy.

It was first published in the UK in 1976 by The Bodley Head, and in the US in 1978 by Macmillan Inc., New York. It was named one of the Best Books for 1978 by the American Library Association and was shortlisted for the Whitbread Award and the Other Award.

The Borribles can be seen to subvert the mainstream of children's literature in that it does not attempt to gloss over grunge, pain, and violence. The language of the book is true to the London streets, including various instances of swearing. This created much controversy among reviewers and contributed to the failure of the book to be paperbacked in the UK.

The controversy surrounding The Borribles caused the book and its two sequels to go underground for years. However, in June 2002 the trilogy was republished in one volume in the UK by Pan Macmillan as a trade paperback; in April 2003, the UK branch of Tor Books reissued the trilogy in a smaller paperback volume. Tor released the trilogy as three separate paperback volumes in the USA in late 2005.

== Plot ==
Borribles are runaway children whose ears become pointed as they take to the streets, indicators of their independence and intelligence. As long as their ears remain unclipped they will never age; for this reason, they wear woollen hats pulled low over their ears to remain undetected by the authorities, who find their freedom threatening to the social order. Borribles are skinny, scruffy, and tough; they have nothing to do with money, and nick what they need to survive.

In this first book of the trilogy, the Battersea chief lookout, Knocker, discovers a Rumble in Battersea Park. Fearing a full-scale invasion of the Battersea Borribles' section of London by these pretentious rat-like creatures – the mortal enemies of the Borribles – the London Borribles plan an attack on the Rumble High Command. A handful of elite fighters are chosen from eight London tribes to infiltrate the Rumble bunker and eliminate the Rumble High Command. Thus, Napoleon, Chalotte, Sydney, Vulge, Bingo, Stonks, Torreycanyon, and Orococco set out to squash the Rumble threat – but other Borribles have secret agendas and personal vendettas of their own which create an even greater threat than the Rumbles ever were. The adventure descends into a desperate fight for the very existence of Borrible life.

== Film adaptation ==
The film rights for The Borrible Trilogy were being developed by CUBA Pictures, the film development arm of literary agents Curtis Bown.

== Critical reception ==
Lucy Mangan from The Guardian wrote, "Although I never loved it, its gripping, take-no-prisoners narrative will undoubtedly appeal to others, and maybe particularly to those who are put off by a sense that reading is "soppy" and that all books are steeped in the cosiness De Larrabeiti lamented."

== See also ==
- The Borribles Go For Broke: the second volume of The Borrible Trilogy
- The Borribles: Across the Dark Metropolis: the third volume of The Borrible Trilogy
