= Tony Connor =

John Anthony Connor (born 1930) is an English poet and playwright.

== Biography ==
Tony Connor was born in Manchester, England. After leaving school at 14, he served in the British Army as a tank gunner, and worked as a textile designer between 1944 and 1960, and in radio and television in Manchester in the 1960s. He was a founder member of The Peterloo Group. He earned an MA at the University of Manchester in 1967 and in 1968 visiting writer at Amherst College in Massachusetts.

In 1961, he married the speech therapist, Frances Foad. They had three children: two sons, Samuel and Simon, and a daughter Rebecca. They divorced in 1979.

From 1971 until he retired in 1999 Connor was professor of English at Wesleyan University in Middletown, Connecticut.

He lives in Middletown and London. He was a close friend of the English writer J. G. Ballard and remains close friends with Michael de Larrabeiti. One section of Connor's 2006 anthology Things Unsaid is dedicated to de Larrabeiti; de Larrabeiti's 1992 book Journal of a Sad Hermaphrodite is dedicated to Connor, and includes one of his poems.

Connor has published nine volumes of poetry. His work is anthologized in British Poetry since 1945. He has been a Fellow of the Royal Society of Literature since 1974.

== Bibliography ==
- With Love Somehow (1962)
- Lodgers (1965)
- Kon in Springtime (1968)
- In the Happy Valley (1971)
- The Memoirs of Uncle Harry (1974)
- New and Selected Poems (Connor) (1982)
- Spirits of the Place (1986)
- Metamorphic Adventures (1996)
- Things Unsaid: Selected Poems 1960-2005 (Anvil Press Poetry, 2006)
- The Empty Air (Anvil Press Poetry, 2013)
- A Century of Childhoods (Kin Press, 2022)
