= Leona Gom =

Canadian poet and novelist

- Born: 29 August 1946 (age 80); Hines Creek, Alberta
- Occupations: Poet; Novelist
- Writing career
- Period: 1972 - present
- Notable awards: Canadian Authors Association Award for Best Book of Poetry for Land of the Peace (1980)

Leona Gom (born 1946) is a Canadian poet and novelist.

== Life ==
Gom was born on an isolated farm in northern Alberta near Hines Creek. She received her B.Ed. and M.A. from the University of Alberta in Edmonton. She has published six books of poetry and eight novels and has won both the Canadian Authors Association Award for her poetry collection Land of the Peace in 1980 and the Ethel Wilson Fiction Prize for her novel Housebroken in 1986.

She taught for many years at Douglas College, Kwantlen College, the University of Alberta and the University of British Columbia. For about ten years she edited the award-winning magazine Event. She held writer-in-residencies at the University of Alberta, the University of Lethbridge and the University of Winnipeg. While serving as writer-in-residence at the University of Alberta in 1988, Gom selected poems for the final edition of the Alberta Poetry Yearbook, titled Sixty Singing Years: An Anthology of Canadian Verse Chosen from Selections First Published in the Sixty Editions.

Her work has been included in many journals and over fifty anthologies, and five of her books have been translated into other languages. Her novel The Y Chromosome has been optioned for a movie and has been used as a text in both women's studies and sociology courses in Canada and the U.S. Her latest novel is The Exclusion Principle (Sumach Press, 2009). Quill & Quire calls it "an entertaining read, in which the quotidian world of marriage and the exotic field of astronomy mesh."

The Leona Gom Archive is housed at the University of Calgary.

== Bibliography ==
=== Fiction ===
- Housebroken (Edmonton: NeWest, 1986) and (Toronto: Paperjacks, 1989)
- Zero Avenue (Vancouver: Douglas & McIntyre, 1989) and (In Europe: Orlanda Frauenverlag, 1991 and Fischer Paperbacks, 1984)
- The Y Chromosome (Toronto: Sumach/Second Story, 1990) and (Montreal: Alire Press, 2000)
- After-Image: A Vicky Bauer Mystery (Toronto: Sumach/Second Story, 1996) and (In USA: St. Martin's Press, 1996) and (In Germany: Fischer Paperbacks, 2000)
- Double Negative: A Vicky Bauer Mystery (Toronto: Sumach/Second Story, 1998, ISBN 1-896764-07-X) and (In Germany: Fischer Paperbacks, 2000)
- Freeze Frame: A Vicky Bauer Mystery (Toronto: Sumach/Second Story, 1999) and (In Germany: Fischer Paperbacks, 2000)
- Hating Gladys (Toronto: Sumach, 2002)
- The Exclusion Principle (Toronto: Sumach, 2009)

=== Poetry ===
- Kindling (Fredericton: Fiddlehead,1972)
- The Singletree (Victoria: Sono Nis, 1975)
- Land of the Peace (Saskatoon: Thistledown, 1980)
- Northbound (Saskatoon: Thistledown, 1984)
- Private Properties (Victoria: Sono Nis, 1986)
- The Collected Poems (Victoria: Sono Nis, 1991)
- Justice (Something: Some Thing, 19something)
