= Georgia Disappeared =

1992 book

- Author: Ellen Godfrey
- Language: English
- Genre: Mystery fiction, crime fiction
- Publisher: Penguin
- Publication date: 1992
- Publication place: Canada
- ISBN: 9781853812569
- OCLC: 877272633

Georgia Disappeared is a mystery novel written by Canadian author Ellen Godfrey. Her fourth mystery novel, it follows corporate headhunter Jane Treger as she investigates the disappearance of her friend Georgia Arnott, the head of a team developing a new computer program.

== Reception ==
Robin Skelton of the Times Colonist recommended the novel and called the conclusion "deliciously surprising". Janice Mant of the Edmonton Journal opined that Godfrey's "expertise in the computer software field provides the interesting wrinkle in this novel." Harvey Schachter of The Kingston Whig-Standard called the characters "well drawn" and wrote that Godfrey "gently leads us through a fascinating tangle of intrigue and emotion, in which all seems opaque until the clarity of the revelation."
