= French leave (disambiguation) =

French leave may refer to:

- French leave, a leave of absence without permission or without announcing one's departure
- French Leave (novel), by P.G. Wodehouse
- French Leave (de Larrabeiti), memoirs
- French Leave (play), a play by Reginald Berkeley
- French Leave (1930 film), a British film adaptation
- French Leave (1937 film), a British film adaptation
- French Leave (1948 film), an American comedy film
