= Frances MacCurtain =

- Born: Frances Foad; 12 October 1936; Belfast, Northern Ireland
- Died: 26 March 1998 (aged 61)

Frances MacCurtain (12 October 1936 - 26 March 1998) was a Northern Irish speech therapist and voice coach, and the first person to receive a PhD in speech science in Britain.

== Life ==
Frances MacCurtain was born Frances Foad in Belfast on 12 October 1936. Her parents were Roland, a chartered accountant and Betty Foad. She had one brother. Her father was employed as a financial director over a number of government bodies relating to the steel industry. In the 1960s, he was involved in the fixing of steel prices. The Foad family left Belfast when MacCurtain was young, moving to Surrey, where she grew up.

In 1959, she qualified as a speech therapist, with her first appointment being in Manchester. She would go on to focus on clinical research relating to phonetics and voice quality. In 1961, she married the poet Tony Connor, with whom she had three children: 2 sons, Samuel and Simon, and a daughter, Rebecca. MacCurtain continued her clinical work, and did some lecturing in Manchester Polytechnic. She divorced Connor in 1979, and remarried to Austin MacCurtain. She later divorced MacCurtain.

In 1979, MacCurtain was awarded an M.Sc. in phonetics from University College, London, and in the same year was appointed had of a research team at Middlesex Hospital investigating laryngectomy measurement. The work of this team resulted in numerous publications on the anatomical and pharyngeal effects of singing and laughter. She completed a PhD concurrently with this work, and in 1982 she became the first person to receive a PhD in speech science in Britain with the thesis entitled Pharyngeal factors influencing voice quality. She went on to make appearances on the BBC television show, Tomorrow's World, and lectured at the Royal College of Surgeons, London and in the United States. Her work imaging and measuring voice function using techniques such as xeroradiography was noticed by the commercial sector, and in collaboration with IBM, MacCurtain developed the IBM Speech Viewer computer which was used in speech clinics. She left research in 1988, and founded VoicePower (later renamed Zarbo), training business executives techniques to control their voices during high pressure presentations.

MacCurtain died on 26 March 1998.

== Selected publications ==
- MacCurtain, F. and Connor, S.M. (1992), "Women and Men Working Together: The Voice Power Experience", Industrial and Commercial Training, Vol. 24 No. 4.
