= Cora Taylor =

Canadian writer (born 1936)

- Born: January 14, 1936 (age 90); Fort Qu'Appelle, Saskatchewan, Canada
- Occupation: Writer
- Writing career
- Genres: Children's literature, young adult fiction

Cora Taylor (born January 14, 1936) is a Canadian writer. Born in Fort Qu'Appelle, Saskatchewan, she moved to Edmonton in 1955. Her career as a writer began as editor of the Alberta Poetry Yearbook from 1980 to 1985. She wrote many articles and short stories for publication in various Canadian periodicals. Cora's first major success came with the publication of her first novel Julie by Coteau Books. Her second published novel was The Doll, which featured artwork on its cover painted by her daughter Wendy Mogg. Following that came Summer of the Mad Monk, a story set in 1932 during the Dust Bowl. Her fourth and most popular novel to date is On the Wings of a Dragon. A sequel was released but did not gain as much popularity as the first. Following that was Out on the Prairie, The Deadly Dance, and then the Ghost Voyages series. The latest Ghost Voyages Book (Part IV) was released on May 3, 2008. The main character in the Ghost Voyages series has the same name of Taylor's first grandson, Jeremy Belly. Aunt Wendy is based on her daughter, Wendy Mogg. Other books written include the Angelique series.

== Bibliography ==
=== Novels ===
- Julie (1985)
- The Doll (1987)
- Yesterday's Doll (1990)
- Ghost Voyages (1992–2008)
  - Ghost Voyages
  - Ghost Voyages 2: The Matthew (2008)
  - Ghost Voyages III: Endeavour and Resolution (2004)
  - Ghost Voyages IV: Champlain and Cartier (2004)
- Summer of the Mad Monk (1994)
- Vanishing Act (1997)
- On Wings of a Dragon (2001)
- Angelique series (2002, 2005, 2006)
  - Angelique: Buffalo Hunt (Our Canadian Girl) (2002
  - Our Canadian Girl Angelique #2 the Long Way Home (2005)
  - Our Canadian Girl Angelique #3 Autumn Alone (2005)
  - Our Canadian Girl Angelique #4 Angel in the Snow (2006)
- Adventure in Istanbul (The Spy Who Wasn't there) (2004)
- On Wings of Evil (2005)
- Murder in Mexico (The Spy Who Wasn't There) (2006)
- Many Places (2007)
- Chaos in China (The Spy Who Wasn't There) (2009)
- Finding Melissa (2014)

=== Biography ===
- Victoria Callihoo: An Amazing Life (2009)
