= The Redwater Raid =

1972 novel by Michael de Larrabeiti

- First edition cover
- Author: Michael de Larrabeiti writing as "Nathan Lestrange"
- Language: English
- Genre: Western novel
- Publisher: Coronet Books
- Publication date: 17 July 1972
- Publication place: United Kingdom
- Media type: Print (Paperback)
- Pages: 144 pp (first edition, paperback)
- ISBN: 0-340-15989-8 (first edition, paperback)
- OCLC: 16198385

The Redwater Raid is a novel written by the English author Michael de Larrabeiti and published in 1972 in the United Kingdom by Coronet Books under the penname of "Nathan Lestrange".
