= Laurence Whitfield =

English artist

- Born: 23 November 1938
- Education: Manchester Central Grammar School, The Slade School of Fine Art - London
- Spouse: Heinke (married 1965)
- Children: Mirko, Katja, Saskia
- Website: whitfield-net.de

Laurence Whitfield (born 1938 in Manchester) is an English artist. He was a member of The Peterloo Group, and studied at Manchester Regional College of Art, now known as Manchester College of Arts and Technology (MANCAT).

== Career ==
Laurence Whitfield went to the Slade School of Fine Art, London in 1960, where he was a contemporary and friend of Colin Self, Peter Green, and Terry Atkinson, all exhibiting at the I.C.A "Young Contemporaries" exhibitions 1961 and 1962. He left the Slade and worked in London with Eduardo Paolozzi who was an important influence. He moved to Paris in 1962 where he met Fluxus artist, Emmett Williams, with whom he collaborated, and help stage the Fluxus group event "Poesie Et/Cetera" at the Musee d'Art Moderne in 1963.

In 1965 he returned to London and showed work at the Marlborough New London Gallery, the Galleria d'arte Moderna, Palermo, and in Biella, Italy. He was the first prize-winner, Welsh Arts Council Exhibition in 1968. Chosen by the British Council to represent Britain at "Forma Viva – International Symposium of Sculptors, Kostanjavica na krki 1968". In 1969 he was, along with Colin Self, part of an Institute of Contemporary Arts exhibition which travelled to New York and Toronto. He was Artist in Residence at The University of Kentucky, Lexington KY. USA in 1970. His work was purchased for the Arts Council of Great Britain; "Bryan Kneale Sculpture Purchases" and toured England in 1972. Several exhibitions followed until in 1985 he rejoined Emmett Williams and with Peter Green staged an evening of Fluxus performances "Art into Music into Art" at the Green Park Theatre, Bath, England, and in 1988; "Etc; International Symposium of Art" Warsaw, Poland. In 1988 he was a participant in "An Bord - Karl Valantin und seine Art-Verwandten", Marlene Frei Galerie, Zürich.

He has held various teaching posts, being from 1965 to 1971, a regular part-time Lecturer in Sculpture at The Bath Academy of Art, Corsham, and Newport College of Art. From 1971 to 1989 he was Senior Lecturer in Fine Art at The Polytechnic, Wolverhampton, and was Artist in Residence at the University of Kentucky, Lexington USA in 1970, also L’Ecole des Beaux Arts, Le Mans, France in 1979. In 1985 he lectured at the Faculty of Fine Arts, University of Gujarat, Baroda, India. He gave up teaching in 1990 and has since worked privately and professionally, now living in Baden-Württemberg, Southern Germany, where his most recent exhibitions of drawings, paintings and sculpture were in June 2011 at the Gallery Art Road Way, Ammerbuch-Breitenholz and Galerie Kreissparkasse Tübingen, Rottenburg, September 2015. Council of Europe (Conseil de l'Europe) Strasbourg, Retrospective Exhibition, 2018.

His work is included in several important collections, including Saatchi in England and Würth in Germany.

== General references ==
- 'The Peterloo Group'
- 'Emmett Williams'
- 'The Courier-Journal & Times, Louisville, Kentucky, November 22, 1970'
- 'Art and Artists' Art Magazine, December 1967'
- 'Sculpture, For the Collection/Purchases by Bryan Kneale, Arts Council of Great Britain 1976' Catalogue

'An Anecdoted Topography of Chance' Daniel Spoerri. Something Else Press, New York, 1966
