= The Borrible Trilogy =

1976–1986 novels by Michael de Larrabeiti

- Author: Michael de Larrabeiti
- Cover artist: Liz Pyle
- Language: English
- Series: The Borrible Trilogy
- Genre: Fantasy literature
- Publisher: Tor Books
- Publication date: 2003 (trilogy edition)
- Publication place: United Kingdom
- Media type: Print (hardback & paperback)
- Pages: 726 pp (2003 Tor UK Edition)
- ISBN: 0-330-49085-0
- OCLC: 59372992

The Borrible Trilogy is a series of young adult books written by English writer Michael de Larrabeiti. The three volumes in the trilogy are The Borribles, The Borribles Go For Broke, and The Borribles: Across the Dark Metropolis.

The Borribles' antagonists, the Rumbles, who play a significant part in the first book, are satires of perennial children's favorites, The Wombles.

== The world of the Borribles ==
The trilogy is set in London. Borribles are runaway children, who eventually become "Borribled", when they wake up and find their ears have become pointed. Visually very similar to the mischievous elves and pixies of English folklore, Borribles wear woollen hats pulled low over their ears to avoid being easily identified by the police "Woollies". The Woollies believe that the Borribles are a threat to the social order and will clip the ears of any Borrible in their custody. If their ears are not cut, Borribles will maintain the appearance of a child forever and cease to physically age. Being caught by the police is a prospect worse than death for Borribles, as it will signify the end of their lifestyle and they will become boring adults.

Borribles are skinny, scruffy, and tough; at least at first, they appear to have nothing to do with money and steal what they need to survive. They generally live in abandoned houses, though they will live wherever they can, existing on the edge of the adult world. Borribles aren't given their names at the instant they become Borribles; they earn them later through an adventure of some sort.

They have many sayings and practices, such as: "Fruit of the barrow is enough for a Borrible"; "Never stand behind a door when someone is coming through the other side"; "It is sad to pass through life without one good adventure"; and "It is better to die young than to be caught." How long Borribles can live is never made entirely clear. One character in The Borribles speaks of being Borribled in the time of "the old queen", but does not clarify if that means Queen Victoria (r. 1837–1901).

== Book 1: The Borribles ==
Cover of the 2005 United States edition of The Borribles

The Borribles (occasionally known as The Borribles: The Great Rumble Hunt) is the first book in the trilogy. It was first published in the United Kingdom in 1976 by The Bodley Head, and in the United States in 1978 by Macmillan Inc., New York. It was named one of the Best Books for 1978 by the American Library Association and was shortlisted for the Whitbread Awards and the Other Award (an award from the now-defunct Children's Rights Workshop).

=== Plot summary ===
The stories begin with the discovery by the Battersea Chief-Lookout, Knocker, of a Rumble in Battersea Park. The Rumbles are rat-like creatures that live in an underground bunker in Rumbledom and are hated by the Borribles for their riches, power, and haughtiness. Fearing a full-scale invasion of Battersea, each of the Borrible tribes across London sends their best and brightest unnamed members to form an elite hit squad, known as "The Magnificent Eight" or "The Adventurers," to infiltrate the Rumble bunker and eliminate the eight members of the Rumble High Command.

Rumbles are a parody of the popular children's characters, the Wombles of Wimbledon Common. On the way, the Borribles also meet a particularly vicious parody of Steptoe and Son (which was one of the most popular shows on TV at the time) in the form of Dewdrop, a former Borrible, and his son Erbie.

The Adventurers are each assigned the name of the individual target of the High Command that they are to assassinate: Napoleon Boot, the suspicious and cynical Borrible; Chalotte, the challenging and brave girl Borrible; Vulgarian (Vulge), frail-looking, but "tough as nails"; Bingo, always cheerful; Sydney, another female, and an animal-lover; Stonks, solid and kind-hearted; Torreycanyon, light-hearted with a knack for mechanics; Orococco, the jovial, black Borrible. Napoleon, Chalotte, Sydney, Vulge, Bingo, Stonks, Torreycanyon, and Orococco set out to squash the Rumble threat – but other Borribles have secret agendas and personal vendettas of their own which create an even greater threat than the Rumbles ever were. The supposedly straightforward adventure dominoes into a desperate fight for the very existence of Borrible life.

== Book 2: The Borribles Go For Broke ==
Cover of the 2005 United States edition of The Borribles Go For Broke

The Borribles Go For Broke was first published in 1981 by The Bodley Head in the United Kingdom.

=== Plot summary ===
Following the adventures of "The Great Rumble Hunt" in the trilogy's first volume, the second volume begins with the surviving adventurers' discovery that Sam the horse, who played a significant role in their first adventure, is still alive. In attempting to rescue him the Borribles are lured into danger both by the newly established Special Borrible Group (SBG), a branch of the police determined to wipe out the Borribles and their way of life, and by one of their own – Spiff, whose motives behind the mission to Rumbledom are slowly revealed.

All this leads the Borribles deep into Wendle territory beneath the streets of Wandsworth and down into a shifting tunnel of mud dug deep beneath the mudflats of the Wandle River.

== Book 3: The Borribles: Across the Dark Metropolis ==
Cover of the 2005 United States edition of The Borribles: Across the Dark Metropolis

The Borribles: Across the Dark Metropolis was first published in 1986 by Piccolo Books in the United Kingdom.

=== Plot summary ===
Battersea is no longer safe for a Borrible. The SBG (an allusion to the Special Patrol Group), a section of the London police driven on by the fanatical Inspector Sussworth (an allusion to the sus laws) and dedicated to finding Borribles and clipping their ears is determined to wipe them out. The Borribles decide to escort Sam the horse to safety in Neasden and then return to the old way of life of independence and freedom. They begin their journey Across the Dark Metropolis, a journey that tests the courage and cunning of the Adventurers to the limits.

== Reception ==
David Langford reviewed The Borribles in the June 1983 issue of White Dwarf, stating:

The Borribles' underground society is nicely imagined, and the heroisms, treacheries, and callousness follow logically from the way Borribles are. Without going all preachy, the author makes it clear that this kind of fun adventure is liable to get you killed: half the main characters are nastily betrayed and die futilely. As well as considerable imaginative flair, The Borribles has the ring of truth.

Langford's review of The Borribles Go For Broke, in the May 1984 issue of White Dwarf, states:

Sussworth and his minion Sergeant Hanks are brilliantly awful grotesques, like Dickens characters; with their ghastly dedication they'd burn any number of ideologically unsound books, especially this one. Meanwhile, the main story is about bloody internecine strife between Borribles and amounts to a mini-epic. Fine stuff.

Langford's review of The Borribles: Across the Dark Metropolis, in the December 1986 issue of White Dwarf, states:

Again London's underside is the nightmare background for a quest, and the torturous journey from Battersea to Neasden has a far higher death toll than that relatively cosy toddle through Mordor. Triumph is bloody (especially in the luridly detailed Camden slaughterhouse) and expensive.

== Publication history ==
The scheduled release of the third book coincided with a police shooting and subsequent riots in London in 1985, and because of the book's strong anti-authoritarian theme, the publishers held back on publishing it until 1986. The books went out of print but have been republished as a single volume. In June 2002 the trilogy was printed in the UK by Pan Macmillan as a trade paperback with an introduction by China Miéville. In April 2003, the UK branch of Tor Books reissued the trilogy in a smaller paperback volume. Tor released the trilogy as three separate paperback volumes in the US in late 2005.

== The Borrible Trilogy in translation ==
The Borrible Trilogy is, as of 24 July 2006, in print in English in both the United States and the United Kingdom:

- In the UK: The Borrible Trilogy. London: Tor, 2003. ISBN 0-330-49085-0.
- In the US:
  - The Borribles. New York: Tor, 2005. ISBN 0-7653-5005-X.
  - The Borribles Go For Broke. New York: Tor, 2005. ISBN 0-7653-5006-8.
  - The Borribles: Across the Dark Metropolis. New York: Tor, 2005. ISBN 0-7653-5007-6.

The Borrible Trilogy is also in print in the following languages:

- German:
  - Die Borribles Auf zur Großen Rumbeljagd (translation of Book 1). Trans. Joachim Kalka. Stuttgart: Hobbit Presse, 1996. ISBN 3-608-87511-5
  - Die Borribles Im Labyrinth der Wendels (translation of Book 2). Trans. Joachim Kalka. Stuttgart: Hobbit Presse, 1996. ISBN 3-608-87512-3
  - Die Borribles Die Schleppnetzfahndung (translation of Book 3). Trans. Joachim Kalka. Stuttgart: Hobbit Presse, 1996. ISBN 3-608-87513-1
- French:
  - Les Zorribles (translation of Book 1). Trans. Alain Robert. Nantes: Librairie l'Atalante, 1994. ISBN 2-905158-87-5
  - Gare Aux Zorribles (translation of Book 2). Trans. Alain Robert. Nantes: Librairie l'Atalante, 1995. ISBN 2-84172-004-7
  - Les Zorribles Dans La Nuit (translation of Book 3). Trans. Alain Robert. Nantes: Librairie l'Atalante, 1996. ISBN 2-84172-023-3
- Italian
  - I Borrible: Attacco a Rumbledonia (translation of Book 1). Trans. Annalisa Di Liddo. Roma: Fanucci, 2006. ISBN 88-347-1172-6.
  - I Borrible: Alla riscossa (translation of Book 2). Trans. Annalisa Di Liddo. Roma: Fanucci, 2006. ISBN 88-347-1231-5.
  - I Borrible: Viaggio nella metropoli oscura (translation of Book 3). Trans. Annalisa Di Liddo. Roma: Fanucci, 2007. ISBN 88-347-1286-2.
- Japanese

The Borrible Trilogy has been in print in the following languages, but is currently out of print:

- Spanish
  - Los Borribles (translation of Book 1). Trans. Joaquín Vidal. Barcelona: Fontanella, 1984. ISBN 84-244-0527-7.
- Swedish
  - Borriblarna och stora rumlarjakten (translation of Book 1). Trans. Sven Christer Swahn. Stockholm: Liber Förlag, 1983. ISBN 91-38-90273-7
  - Borriblarna flyr för livet (translation of Book 2). Trans. Sven Christer Swahn. Stockholm: Liber Förlag, 1983. ISBN 91-38-90274-5
- Danish
  - Boriblerne slår igen (translation of Book 1). Trans. Jørn E. Albert. Copenhagen: Forum, 1982. ISBN 87-553-1110-5

== Film adaptation ==
While a July 2004 report in Variety revealed that a film based on the entire trilogy was being developed by CUBA Pictures, the film development arm of literary agents Curtis Brown, as of 2022 no such film can be found at IMDb, Variety Insight, nor other such online databases of information related to films.

== Parallels ==
The members of the High Command of Rumbles each correspond directly to one of the main characters of The Wombles:

- Vulgarian (Great Uncle Bulgaria)
- Bingo (Bungo)
- Chalotte (Madame Cholet)
- Torreycanyon (Tobermory)
- Orococco (Orinoco)
- Stonks (Tomsk)
- Napoleon Boot (Wellington)
- Sydney (Miss Adelaide)
