= Kitty Black =

South African playwright and literary agent

Dorothy "Kitty" Black
- Black in 1930 (from her biography)
- Born: 30 April 1914; Johannesburg, Union of South Africa
- Died: 20 or 26 December 2006 (aged 92); Chelsea and Westminster Hospital, London, England
- Other names: Kitty Black (nom de plume)
- Education: Roedean School
- Known for: Organisation and translation

Dorothy Black or Kitty Black aka Noir (30 April 1914 – December 2006) was a South African born playwright, literary agent and translator. She was a backer for Radio Atlanta.

== Life ==
Black was born in 1914 in Johannesburg to Francis and Elizabeth Johanna Black. She was the youngest of six children. Educated at Roedean School in Johannesburg. Her brother became a Rugby International but died young. She passed her university entrance exam but she became a concert pianist. She toured for four years but it was her decision to abandon this and she trained as a stenographer.

When she joined the theatrical agents H. M. Tennent Ltd in 1937 when it was a growing success. The management were impressed with idea of having a stenographer and she developed a strong interest in what was a growing business. In 1939 she became Binkie Beaumont's secretary, and the following year she also became secretary to John Gielgud. As a pianist she was able to accompany auditions and performances, and as a confident person she was entrusted to take on secondary casting. She was annoyed to find she had been passed over when the company appointed new managers, including a casting director and Binkie Beaumont's partner.

She moved to work as an assistant to Murray Macdonald who ran "Company of Four", which was also Tennent's company. Here she was based at the Lyric Theatre. She and Macdonald produced several notable theatrical productions, but John Perry explained that she would progress no higher.

Black was head hunted and she became a literary agent at Curtis Brown. She played golf and used her connections to find clients that included Somerset Maugham and Samuel Beckett. She was involved with the noted production of Samuel Beckett's Waiting for Godot in 1956 and holidayed with Maugham in France. She notably told John Osborne to "think again" about his play Look Back in Anger that transformed British theatre. Black was fluent in French and so in love with France that she was sometimes called "Noir". She created translations of plays that were enabled not only by her fluency in French but with her knowledge of theatre after reading so many plays as a literary agent. Her translations included Crime Passionel by Jean-Paul Sartre. She also translated his play "Morts sans Sépulture" and was thrilled when the director said that it was perfect. In partnership with Michael Flanders, she translated Stravinsky's L'Histoire du soldat for the Edinburgh Festival. The work played to capacity audiences in Edinburgh, and again in London at the Royal Festival Hall in 1956 with Flanders as the narrator, Sir Ralph Richardson as the Soldier and Peter Ustinov as the Devil. Their translation has held its place as the standard English version into the 21st century.

In 1957 she was going to be married. She left her job but the marriage never took place. During the 1960s she worked in commercial British television first at Granada Television until 1963 and then for Associated-Rediffusion.

She was a financial backer to Radio Atlanta, which was the first-formed British pirate radio station. In 1976 she became the house manager of the MacOwan Theatre, where she remained until 1986. The idea was cloned by Radio Caroline and, unlike Atlanta, it and others prospered. Black noted that she had failed to make her fortune but she had helped to transform music publishing.

Black died in Chelsea and Westminster Hospital in 2006. The date is given as 20 or 26 December in different sources.

== Works include ==
- The Prince of Bohemia, 1942 (play)
- Morts sans Sépulture, translation
- L'Histoire du soldat, co-translation
- La Putain Respecteuse, translation (1949)
- Le diable et le bon dieu, translation (1952)
- Landslide, 1943 (co-written play)
- The Singing Dolphin, 1963 (co-written play)
- Upper Circle:A Theatrical Chronicle, 1984 (autobiography)
