= The Peterloo Group =

The Peterloo Group was a group of poets, artists and writers in Manchester during the latter part of the 1950s. It had three founder members; Robin Skelton, poet and professor of English at Manchester University, Tony Connor, poet and Michael Neville Seward Snow, painter. Their objective was to bring together the isolated people who were writing and working in the visual arts within the region, and to provide a forum for discussion and exhibition of their work.

== Historical background ==
The first meeting was held in May 1957 in a hired room above the Town Hall Hotel, a Victorian gothic public house in Tib Lane adjacent to Albert Square, - and close to St Peter's Square where in 1819 the infamous Peterloo Massacre had taken place, and from which the group took its name. The first discussion was on the subject of ‘The Social Position of the Arts Today’. Meetings continued on a monthly basis with writers and artists talking about their work and inviting discussion. Amongst the poets leading meetings, were Tony Connor, Michael Dixon, David Dunn, Michael Holroyd, John Knight, Jack Marriott, John McDonald, Robin Skelton, Margaret Snow, Noel Varney and Bernadette Wiseman.

Several exhibitions of painting and sculpture were organized showing members work; the lounge of the nearby Library Theatre being a popular exhibition space. Exhibitors included Michael Snow, Tony Connor, Donald McKenna, Noel Varney and Laurence Whitfield alongside works by the specially invited guests; L. S. Lowry and Cliff Holden.

By 1959 the group had gained considerable status in art ‘scene’ of Manchester, enhanced even more so with the co-operation of the University Extra-Mural Department and enabling the arrangement of events such as a public lecture by Sir Geoffrey Keynes on the work of William Blake. This co-operation, along with the support of the Vice Chancellor of the University, led to meetings between the group and interested parties from the City of Manchester and cleared the way for the formation of the Manchester Institute of Contemporary Arts (‘MICA’), and, with several members moving away from the City, the dissolution of the group in 1960.
