= Hector de Saint-Denys Garneau =

French Canadian poet, writer, letter writer and essayist (1912–1943)

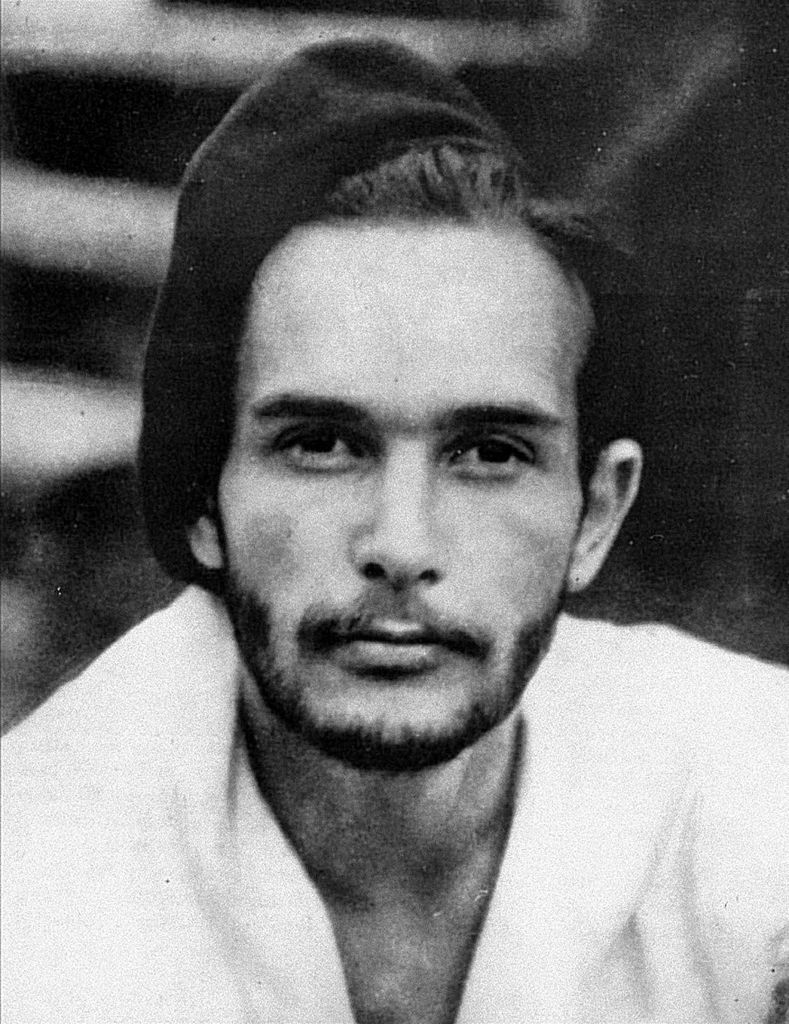
- Born: June 13, 1912; Montreal, Canada
- Died: October 24, 1943 (aged 31); Sainte-Catherine, Canada
- Writing career
- Language: French
- Notable works: Regards et jeux dans l'espace (1937), Œuvres (1971), Œuvres en prose (1995), Journal 1929–1939 (2012), Lettres (2020)

Hector de Saint-Denys Garneau (Montreal, June 13, 1912 – Sainte-Catherine (now: Sainte-Catherine-de-la-Jacques-Cartier), October 24, 1943) was a Canadian poet, writer, letter writer, and essayist, who "was posthumously hailed as a herald of the Quebec literary renaissance of the 1950s". He is mainly recognized for his literary work – in particular, for the only book published during his lifetime, entitled Regards et Jeux dans l'espace, published in 1937 – but he was also a painter. Almost all of his writings are published, without cuts (around 2,600 pages), between 1970 and 2020.

== Life ==
Hector de Saint-Denys Garneau was the grandson of the poet Alfred Garneau and great-grandson of the historian François-Xavier Garneau. He spent his early years at his family's ancestral manor (which his mother had purchased) in Sainte-Catherine (now Sainte-Catherine-de-la-Jacques-Cartier), Quebec, where his cousin Anne Hébert was born in 1916.

Garneau moved to Montréal with his parents in 1923. There, he studied the classics at three Jesuit colleges: Sainte-Marie, Jean-de-Brébeuf and Loyola.

In 1925, Garneau studied painting at Montreal's Collège des beaux-arts with Paul-Émile Borduas, Jean Palardy, Marjorie Smith and Jean Paul Lemieux. He won a bronze medal and second prize for a work of art. In 1934, he exhibited some paintings at the Galerie des Arts in Montréal and, in 1937, he presented his painting "Sky Fall" at the Museum of Fine Arts.

Still in his youth, he founded the monthly journal La relève with his friends Paul Beaulieu, Robert Charbonneau, Robert Élie and Jean Le Moyne.

In 1934, Garneau developed a rheumatic heart problem and discontinued his studies. He then devoted his time to writing poems, painting and music. In 1937, Regards et jeux dans l'espace, his collection of poems, was published. [...] he died in 1943 of a heart attack, after canoeing alone."

== Poetry ==
Garneau first achieved some notice as a poet as a boy of 13, when his poem "Le dinosaure" took first prize in a province-wide essay competition. Two years later, he was awarded a prize by the Canadian Authors' Association for his poem "L'automne".

Garneau wrote poetry prolifically between 1934 and 1937; on one day alone (October 22, 1937), he reportedly wrote 13 poems. In his lifetime, though, he published only one slim volume, the 28-poem Regards et jeux dans l'espace. "Radical in its form, with its unrhymed lines of various lengths, its lack of punctuation and its broken syntax.".

=== Looks and Plays in space ===
Regards et Jeux dans l'espace was published in March 1937 and received a rather cold reception from critics, which (we like to believe,) would have deeply shaken the author. However "contrary to what has been said, Garneau is in no way discouraged by the critical reception: What is to be feared here is the silence he wrote. Also, a month after the publication, "he even undertook, which is completely surprising on his part, an advertising 'campaign' to publicize his book and even then, Garneau did not foresee any particular difficulty in terms of critical reception".

De Saint-Denys Garneau constructed the book according to a very meticulous plan: the layout of the titles and sections in no way determines the layout of the poems. Moreover, one must constantly leave the text and its comprehension and jump to the table of contents to know the titles, the numbers or the order of the poems, since in the text some are titled, others not. These choices are not arbitrary, the table of contents of the original edition having been meticulously prepared by de Saint-Denys Garneau. Looks and Plays in space is composed of twenty-eight poems and divided into seven sections, unified, when we add "Accompaniment", unnumbered, at the end of the seventh section, entitled "Untitled". As Romain Légaré underlines: "the book is supported, like a vital necessity, by an indestructible law, that of the unity of opposites".

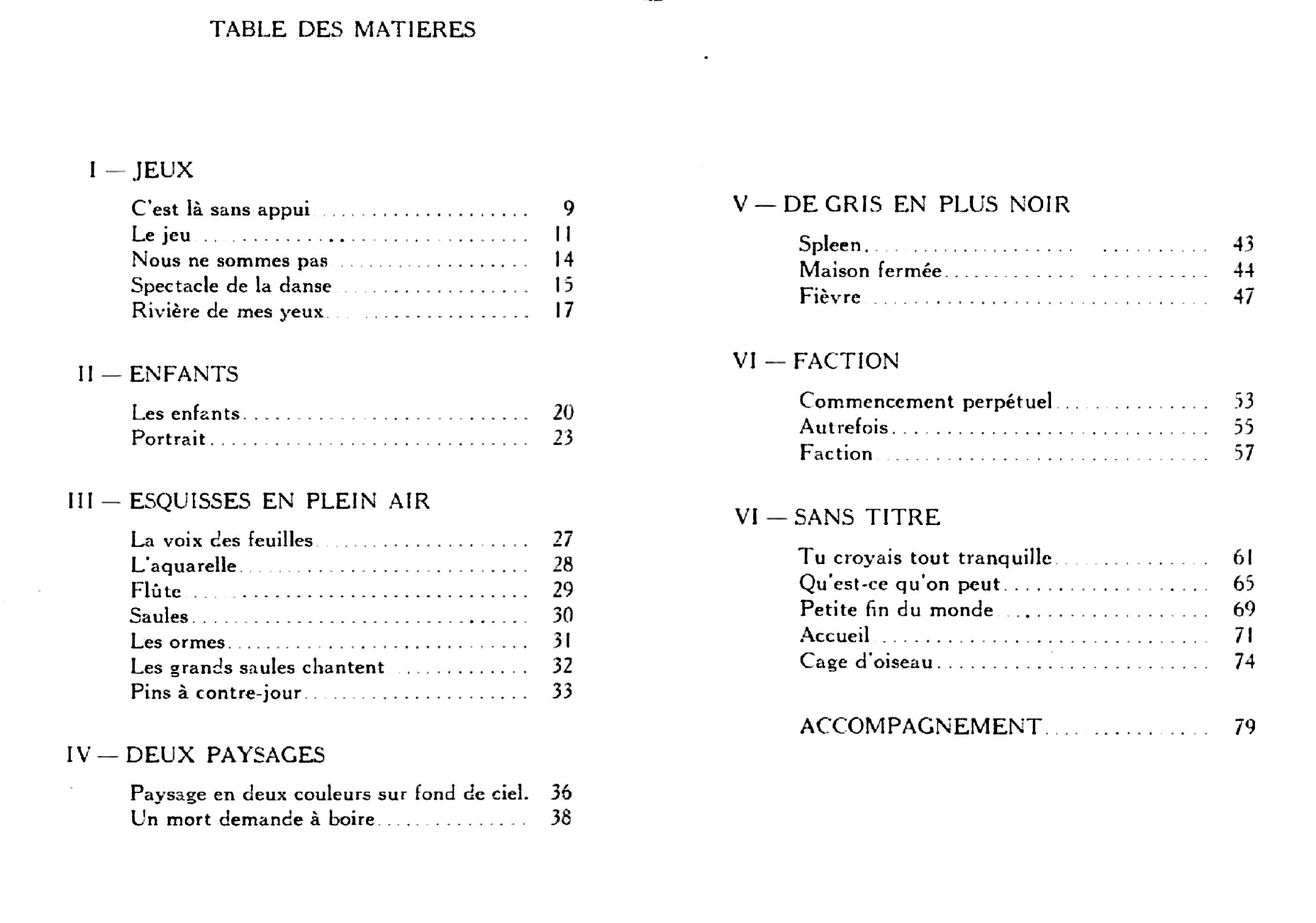
Original edition of 1937

For a long time, the "I" of the different speakers (living things, objects and "others") in this book has been confused with the more erased one of the poet himself. The poems, however, are mystery enough. On the original form of this poetry, François Hébert writes:

"In a very stripped-down speech, the simplest on the surface, but with extremely varied registers, as long as you listen to it, Garneau inlaid a thousand and one surprises [...]: rhymes or assonances and unexpected references ('chaise', double phonetic and semantic contraction of a 'malaise' and a 'chose'), jarring syntax ('living and art'), phonetic gambols (of 'je' to 'jeu', from 'moi' to 'joie' via 'pas'), semantic breaks and leaps (from 'body' to 'soul', from 'self' to 'world'). [...] The verse is mostly odd. And irregular, whimsical even, [...] with its gaps, its variations, its arabesques. [...] Bizarrely laid out on the page (as a staircase, irregularly spaced), the verses abound in unforeseen rhymes, in clever alliterations, placed as if by chance [...]"

Alain Grandbois sums it up: "Garneau's poetry [...] seems to me to provide the most perfect expression of the most astonishing freedom. it unties the chains, escapes and rejoins total emancipation." Even if de Saint-Denys Garneau himself would have been disappointed with its reception, Regards et Jeux dans l'espace is today considered one of the most important books of Quebec poetry.

== Posthumous works ==
=== Letters ===
The recent declassification of many unpublished letters by Garneau calls for a rereading of all of his correspondence, which can no longer simply be considered as a sideline to the work, as it links all the pieces of it. The letters form the most massive part of his work (920 pages, "well packed"). Garneau likes to write long letters, until physical exhaustion. He discusses his readings, compares such and such a composer, comments on an exhibition of paintings, tells an anecdote, paints a portrait, describes a landscape, etc: each time, he 'walks around what he is among what there is.', reconstituting with precision "every moment of what he presents as a game in which he is both the witness and the actor". His story unfolds "before our eyes like a comic strip using simple lines, barely sketches. Moment often "described with a strong, mocking sensuality," as if the poet took, it is clear, great pleasure in feeling what, ordinarily, "arouses only repulsion [...]. His story corrects the expected impression, contradicts the received idea" (still today) that his atypical career "was one of near horror". In the private space of the letter, without the restraint imposed by publication, De Saint-Denys Garneau addresses in a very free and down-to-earth way the central question of all his writings: how to be?.

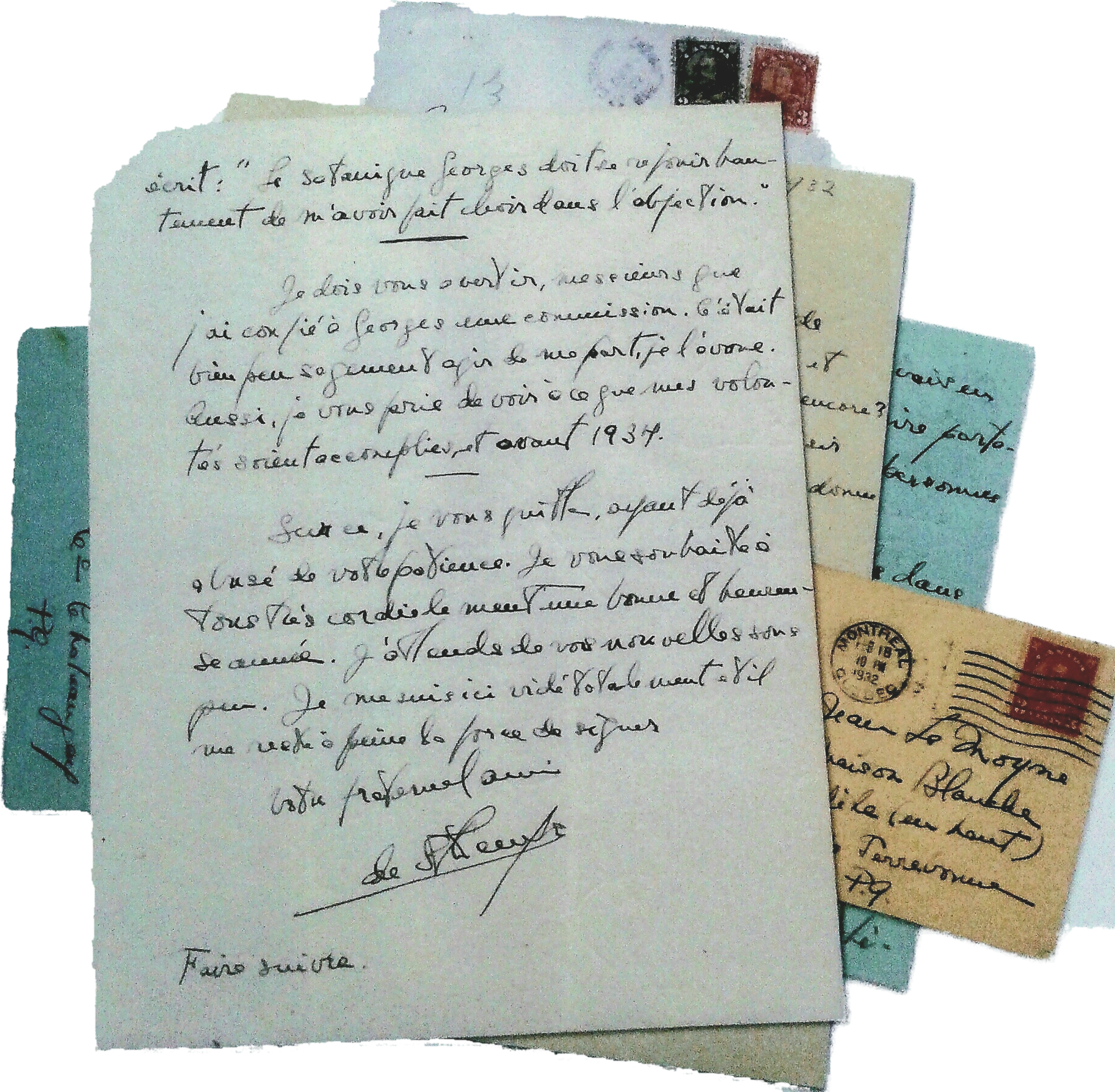
Montage from original letters by Garneau. Bibliothèque et Archives Canada

In the quasi-novel that his letters are, the hero is an "I" who constantly questions his relationship to the world, to others and to himself, as if he were never certain of really existing. We rarely see what the object of the Garnelian letter is, so that we forget its immediate aim. Admittedly, its documentary value is far from negligible, but it remains secondary. It is the ontological framework, in reality, "which motivates epistolary writing". Reading his Letters in the form of a continuous text, one manages to grasp the coherence of this character, for whom "being is a fictional activity", and writing, an absolute. In his letters — and as if his life depended on it — Garneau gives himself entirely, and always questioning the value of this "gift" of oneself, which is writing.

"The correspondence of the poet de Saint-Denys Garneau is one of the most singular. Whether we compare it to those of letter-writers from here or elsewhere, it is difficult to find a single one that really resembles it." — Michel Biron, 2022

For the editor of the Lettres, Michel Biron, "de Saint-Denys Garneau is proving to be a remarkable letter-writer, both in terms of the quality and the quantity of letters written in barely a dozen years". In 2020, we discover "a fascinating letter writer who puts the best of himself into his letters, but also a complex, funny and endearing character" writes Biron, "so different from the character frozen in the role of victim that [we] attributed to him, also so different from an austere and sad Garneau [...]". His letters are “both a sort of novel […] and a form of essay". They tell "the story of a life with an intensity, a lucidity and an acuity superior to anything that Garneau's friends or commentators on his work have attempted to do" and this life, "vibrates everywhere."

=== Texts in prose ===
De Saint-Denys Garneau lived intensely, especially in the period from 1929 to 1938, during which he threw himself headlong into writing. Although the influence of short studies in philosophy is felt in his articles and essays (Œuvres en prose), his Journal 1929–1939 and his many Letters, "all his studies would be nothing if de Saint-Denys Garneau had done no work of personal training. For him, the "intellectual" quest is based on the ontological quest [that is to say, on a "search for being"], which embraces the spiritual and artistic adventure" writes the editor of the Works in prose Giselle Huot. Also, "his work cannot be "understood" or [worse] "explained" without giving a large part to the ontological adventure, which is, at least as far as de Saint-Denys Garneau is concerned, the alpha and the omega."

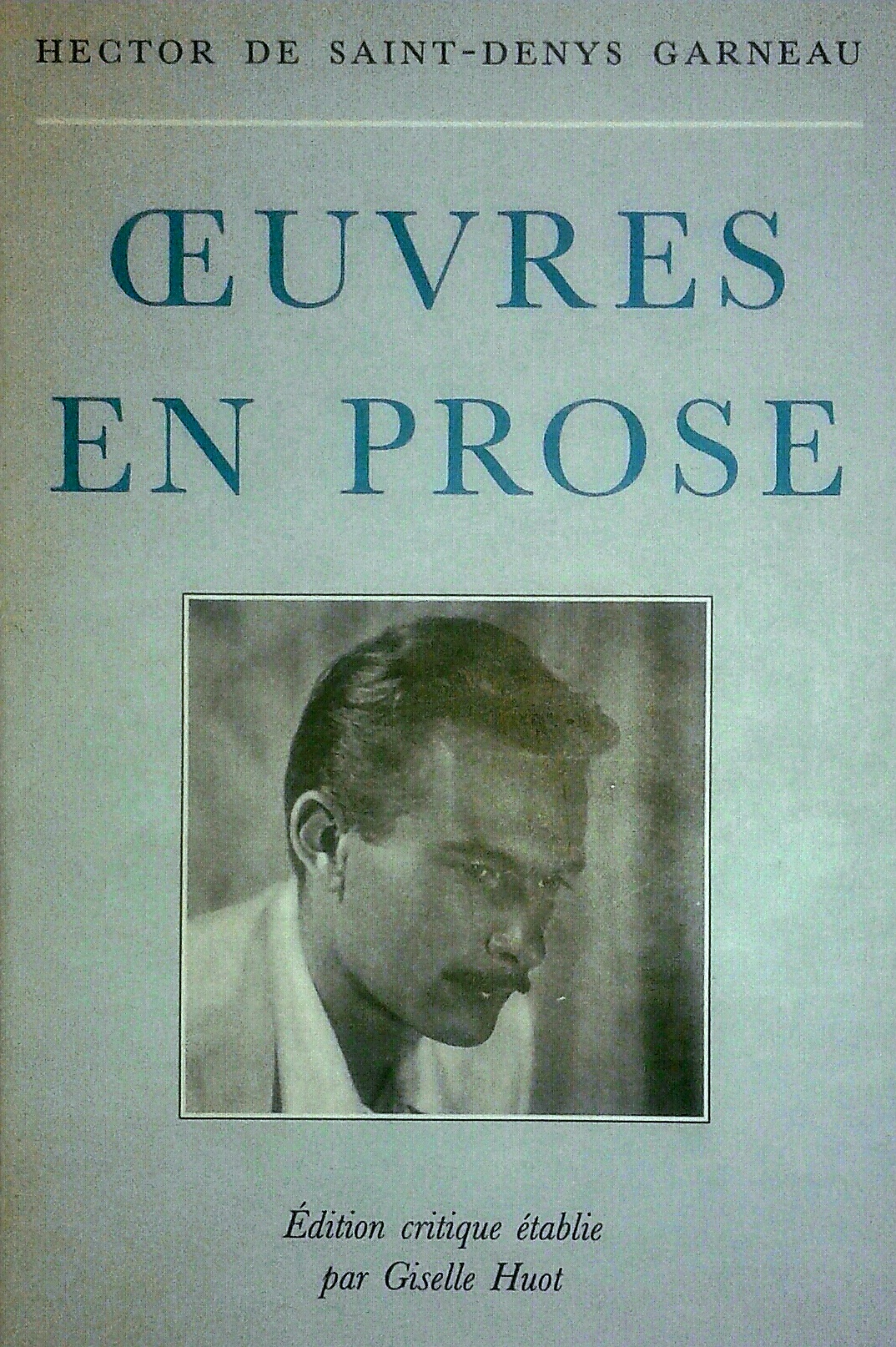
Œuvres en prose by De Saint-Denys Garneau

The distinction between writings intended for publication and private writings hardly works in the case of Garneau: the Works brought together in a first edition of 1,320 pages in 1971 had moreover not been published during the author's lifetime, whether it is the "found" poems, the Journal or the Letters. Biron remarks: "Almost all of Garneau's writings, this is an exceptional fact in the history of modern literature, escapes the public sphere." For François Hébert, de Saint-Denys Garneau "was able to say the essential in a few words, with a terrifying and admirable authenticity" then, "shut it up, to let us find it again".

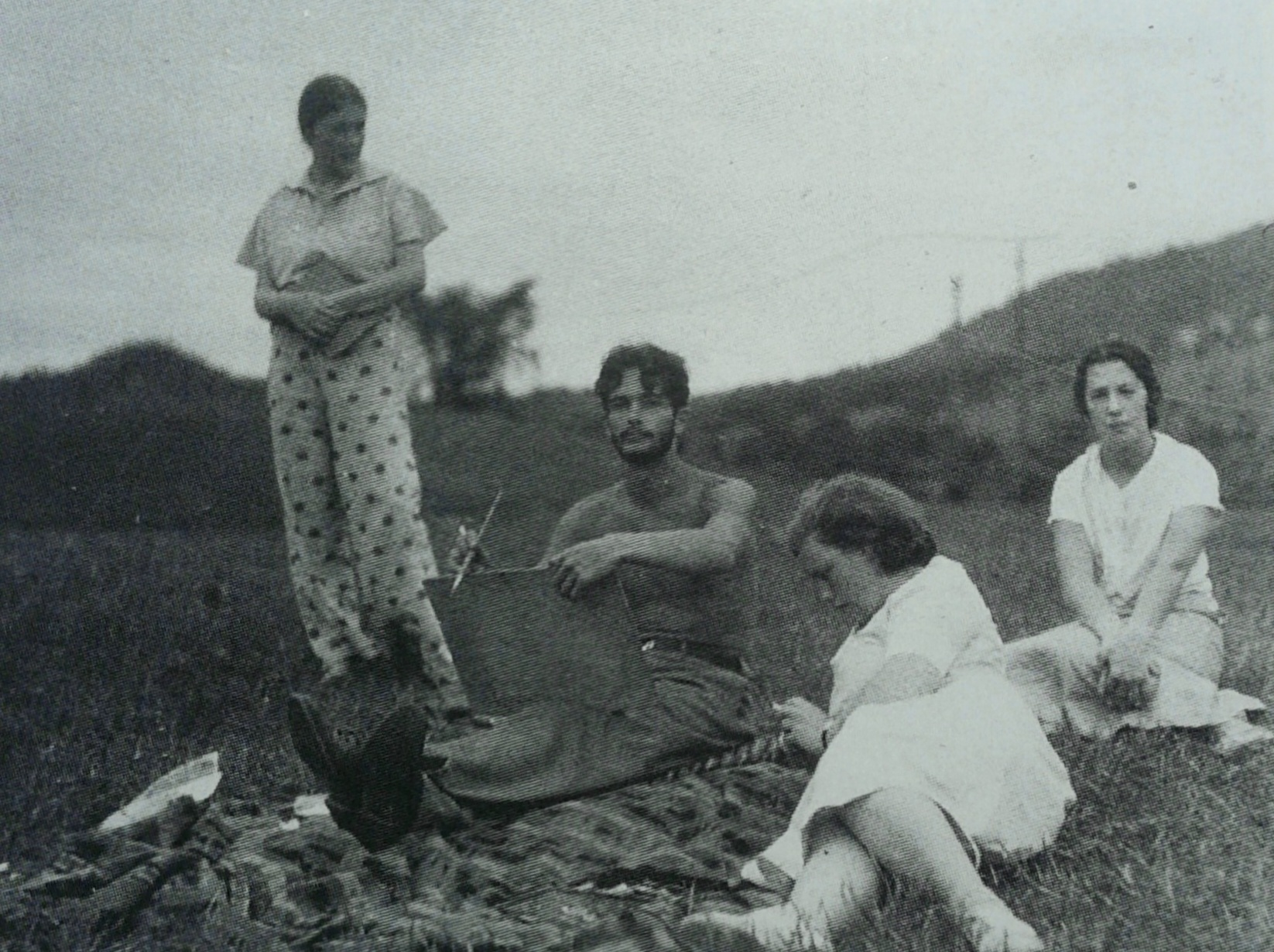
Garneau in Sainte-Adèle with the Palardy, June 1932

Yvon Rivard observes: "De Saint-Denys Garneau died at the age of thirty-one, in 1943. Since his death, he has known a long purgatory from which he has been slowly emerging for several years [...] Most writers Québécois preferred to De Saint-Denys Garneau's 'bad poor' (cf. Œuvres in prose, p. 623.) works of revolt, liberation, affirmation. [...] It is understandable that many turned away from this poet who refused all the subterfuges and all the consolations that literature, religion or the nation offered him. De Saint-Denys Garneau does not write to affirm his singularity, he writes to try to find an answer to the only question that matters [...] When he stops publishing, it is not out of revolt or disappointment, it is that silence appeared to him as the only way to be. ".

=== Diary 1929–1939 ===
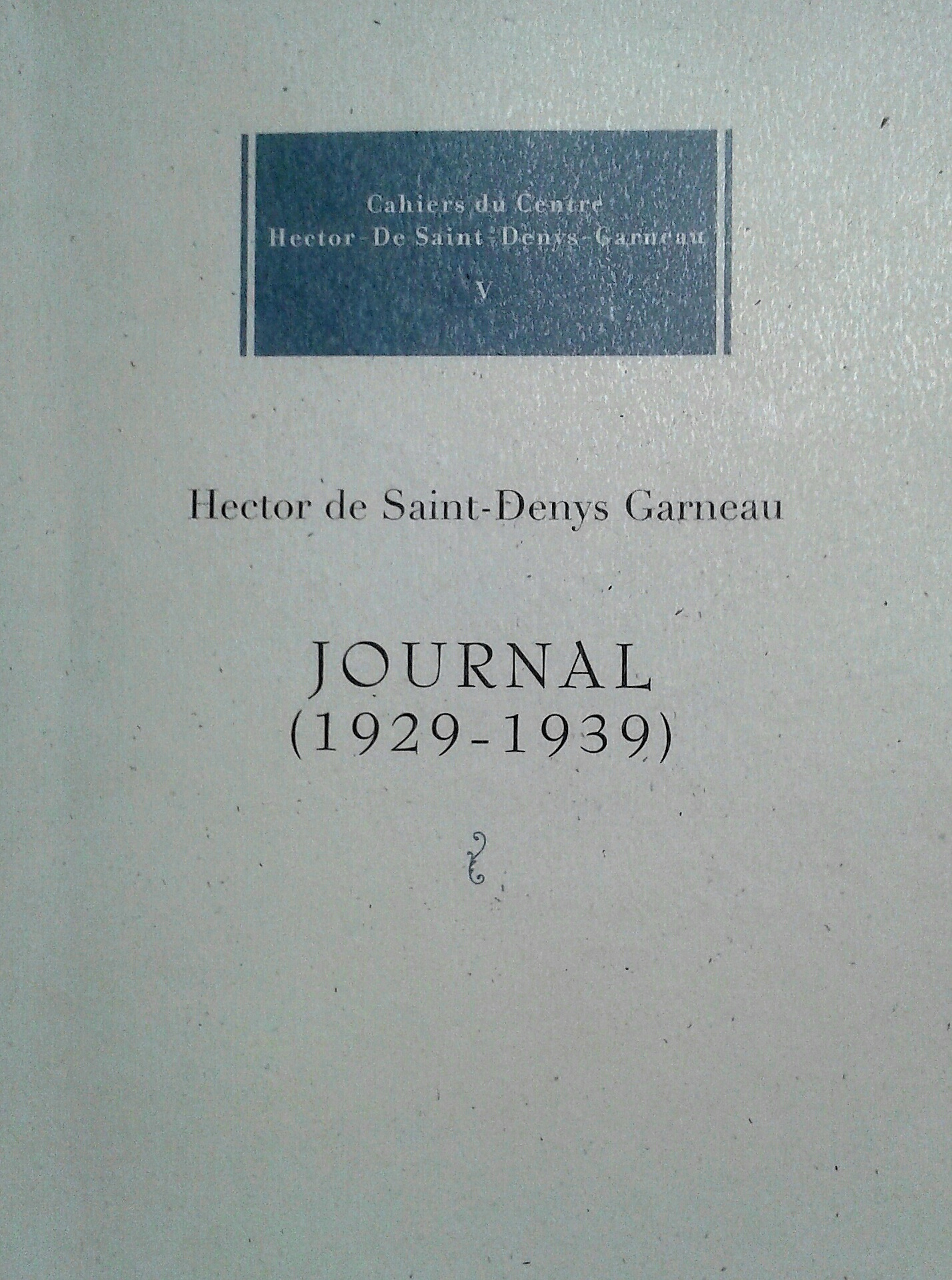
De Saint-Denys Garneau Journal 1929–1939

Between 1929 and 1939, perhaps later, de Saint-Denys Garneau kept his "Journal" consisting of about seven notebooks. According to François Dumont: "The complete edition of the Journal 1929–1939 raised various obstacles until 2012, in particular censorship and the desire of friends to prune and classify the texts according to their aesthetic principles", while de Saint-Denys Garneau himself would have immediately looked for a disorder in his texts. He adds that: "The diversity of the genres practiced and the literary dimension of several of them mean that the word 'diary' does not reflect its particular nature". In attempting to characterize the forms that de Saint-Denys Garneau experimented with in the notebooks that have come down to us—from self-examination, fiction and the letter, to meditations on art, and poetry: "It emerges from this examination that Garneau progressively linked reflective discourse with the openings offered by poetry and fiction: a dynamic develops between the life summary and the sketch, leading to a form of writing that incorporates various aspects of his Diary".

"I would have liked to say: I am not a person who speaks to you, not a person, this disorderly, dispersed being, without a real center. But I hope you would not be wrong in believing that you can still address the center at some point, a small flame perhaps which persists, a remnant of what was ravaged [...], where perhaps persists the place of a possible hope of not being rejected from the Be-ing itself." — Journal 1929–1939, January 21, 1939

One notices a unity in the diversity of the forms borrowed by de Saint-Denys Garneau: "At the end of his journey, de Saint-Denys Garneau manages to free himself from literary conventions to find a totalizing form (but always fragmentary) by which poetry and fiction are linked to existence". Dumont notes that while illustrating "dimensions of the writing of the notebook which transform the usual aims of the diary [...]", the notebooks fall under "an erratic and heuristic form which is undoubtedly closer to the essay such as what Montaigne meant than what the word "essay" has come to designate today".

== Recognition ==
After Garneau's death, his unpublished poems were collected by Élie under the title Les Solitudes, and published in 1949 together with Regards... as Poésies complètes: Regards et jeux dans l'espace, Les solitudes. Garneau's "influence only became apparent after the publication of his Poésies complètes in 1949," says the Dictionary of Literary Biography. "Since that time the number of studies on his life and work has multiplied considerably.". No writer has been the object of so much publications in Quebec. Nowaday Garneau is considered the precursor of contemporary French-Canadian literature.

Garneau's 1935–39 diary was published in Montréal in 1954 under the title Journal, edited by Élie and Le Moyne and with a preface by Gilles Marcotte. Glassco published his translation, The Journal of Hector de Saint-Denys Garneau, in 1962.

Also in 1962, the Canadian poet F. R. Scott translated ten of Garneau's poems into English for his book, Saint-Denys Garneau and Anne Hebert. Glassco published his translated Complete Poems of Hector de Saint-Denys Garneau in 1975. Glassco's book won the Canada Council Award for translation that year.

Garneau's poetry has also been translated into Spanish by Luis Vicente de Aguinaga, and was published in 2007 as Todos y cada uno.

Some of Garneau's poems have been set to music by the Canadian contemporary classical composer Bruce Mather, and by the Quebec folk group Villeray.

=== Awards ===
- Maison Henry Morgan (1926)
- Association des auteurs Canadiens / Canadian Authors Association (1928)
- Canada Council Award (for English translations) (1975)

=== Commemorative postage stamp ===
On September 8, 2003, to commemorate the 50th anniversary of the National Library of Canada, Canada Post released a special commemorative series, "The Writers of Canada", with a design by Katalina Kovats, featuring two English-Canadian and two French-Canadian stamps. Three million stamps were issued. The two French-Canadian authors chosen were De Saint-Denys Garneau and his cousin, Anne Hébert.

=== Public art ===
De Saint-Denys Garneau, along with Octave Crémazie and Émile Nelligan, is commemorated by a large ceramic mural by Georges Lauda, Paul Pannier and Gérald Cordeau at Crémazie metro station in Montréal. Entitled Le Poète dans l'univers, the work features an excerpt from his poem "Faction".

== See also ==
- Quebec literature
- List of Canadian writers
