= Alberta Poetry Yearbook =

Poetry contest administered by the Canadian Authors Association

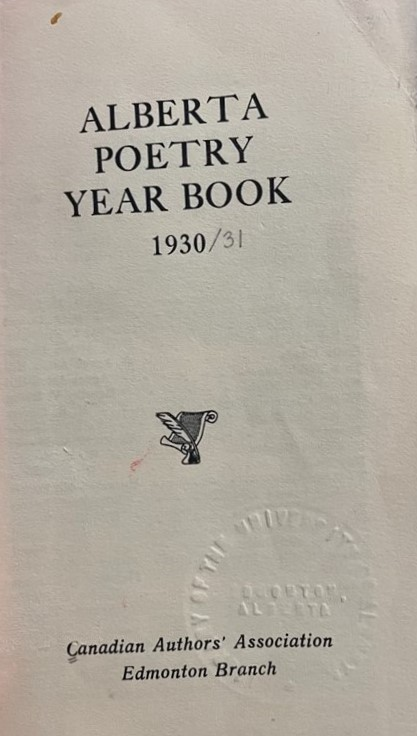
Alberta Poetry Year Book Cover Page (1930)

The Alberta Poetry Yearbook was an annual publication of entries into a poetry contest administered by the Canadian Authors Association (CAA), Edmonton, Alberta branch. The chapbook was published from 1930 until 1989, and the final year of publication was followed by a collection of the best work published in the annual volumes.

== History ==
The Alberta Poetry Year Book was borne out of a meeting of the Edmonton Branch of the CAA in April 1930. A committee composed of members H. R. Leaver, J. H. Acheson, W. E. Edmonds and Alexander Cameron Rutherford, the former Premier of Alberta and the branch's honorary president. This committee was assisted by Edmonton Branch member Georgia May Cook and branch secretary Ida Alberta (nee Srigley) Scouten who served as editor. Through the Alberta Poetry Year Book, the Edmonton Branch sought to inspire Albertan, and later, Canadian, writers to draw inspiration from Canadian nature and subjects, in addition to awakening in a deeper patriotism and interest in their own country.

"In order that the verse-makers’ craft may be held dear in Alberta, and that it may be given both encouragement and nurture, it is to be sincerely hoped that the Authors’ Association may definitely continue in the rôle (sic) of foster father to the versifiers. Our land must not be songless. We need an expression of our own, and doubtless we shall find it, possessing as we do, a people with varied and contrary song from every clime, which song shall ultimately be embodied into the impulsive atmosphere of our own." — Emily Murphy, Alberta Poetry Year Book 1930-1931,

The competition for the Alberta Poetry Year Book was formally opened in September 1930, with entrance open to all residents of the province. Crucially, however, no professional poets were permitted to submit poems. Modest cash prizes were offered for the best poems to entice submissions. Entry fees were also charged, largely to cover the cost of prizes, production, and distribution. Over eighty people made submissions, with 295 poems being received by the Edmonton Branch. Of these, thirty poems were selected for publication by the competitions judges: Evelyn Gowan Murphy, an accomplished author; Donald Ewing Cameron, the first librarian of the University of Alberta; and Mrs. Perren Baker, the spouse of Alberta's education minister Perren Baker. The chapbook was edited by Scouten, while the foreword was written by author, activist, and magistrate Emily Murphy, and the preface by Evelyn Gowan Murphy.

In December 1930, the Alberta Poetry Year Book was published and made available for purchase through local book stores. in Edmonton and Calgary Although the circulation market was small, the inaugural Alberta Poetry Year Book sold well, leading the Edmonton Branch to continue the competition. In 1931, the competition was expanded to include a "Junior Poetry Competition" and a "Short Story Contest." The former was open to all students under the age of 16, with the winner receiving a small cash prize and the publication of their poem in the Alberta Poetry Year Book. Meanwhile, the winner of the "Short Story Contest" had their story published in Alberta newspapers by the Edmonton Branch. In 1936, submissions were opened to all residents of western Canada, later expanded to any entrant from across Canada in 1940.

Although the circulation of the Alberta Poetry Year Book was limited, it made a small profit annually for the Edmonton Branch. However, in 1980, owing to decreasing submissions and rising costs, the Edmonton Branch made the decision to cancel the Alberta Poetry Year Book. Branch member Cora Taylor, however, decided to revive the competition later that year, and took up the position of editor to steward the competition. While the Alberta Poetry Year Book continued to be published for several more years, financial hardship led the Edmonton Branch to again cancel the year book in 1989, this time for good. In 1990, John W. Chalmers edited a collection of the best sixty years of the Alberta Poetry Year book, entitled Sixty Singing Years, with the editorial assistance of Cora Taylor and Elaine Moody.

Running for fifty-nine years, the Alberta Poetry Year Book served as an important poetry market and starting place for aspiring poets. Of the approximately 50,000 poems that were submitted over the fifty-nine years, roughly 1,600 were published.

=== Editors ===
The Alberta Poetry Year Book was edited by Ida Alberta Scouten for twenty-years. Scouten was evidently a writer's dream of an editor as she was reported to carry on an extensive and sympathetic correspondence with many of the contributors, winners and losers alike. She remained as editor of the Alberta Poetry Year Book until 1951 when poor health forced her to relinquish editorship. June Fritch succeeded Scouten in 1952 and edited for the next 27 years until the cancellation of the Alberta Poetry Year Book in 1980. Following the revival of the Alberta Poetry Year Book in late 1980, Taylor served as editor. She held this position until 1985 when she was succeeded by R. John Hayes (1986–87), and finally Jane Livingston who occupied the position of editor from 1988–89.

== See also ==
- Canadian poetry
