= A Rose Beyond the Thames =

Fictional memoir by Michael de Larrabeiti

- Author: Michael de Larrabeiti
- Language: English
- Genre: Memoir/fiction
- Publisher: The Bodley Head
- Publication date: 24 August 1978
- Publication place: United Kingdom
- Media type: Print (Hardback & Paperback)
- Pages: 182 pp
- ISBN: 0-370-30105-6
- OCLC: 4465284
- Dewey Decimal: 823/.9/14 B
- LC Class: CT788.D465 A33

A Rose Beyond the Thames is a partly fictional collection of memoirs written by the British author Michael de Larrabeiti and published in the United Kingdom in 1978 by The Bodley Head.

The title comes from the name of de Larrabeiti's Irish mother, Rose. The book describes Rose and his father, "a shadowy figure of Basque descent who seems to have had an alternative menage in Streatham", and Larrabeiti's chaotic childhood, including evacuation to Arundel and his schooling, which was cut short at 16.

The Guardian called it "a spirited memoir with an element of fiction".
