= Audrey Alexandra Brown =

Canadian poet (1904–1998)

- Born: October 29, 1904; Nanaimo, British Columbia, Canada
- Died: September 20, 1998 (aged 93)
- Writing career
- Genre: Poetry

Audrey Alexandra Brown, OC (29 October 1904 – 20 September 1998) was a Canadian poet.

== Biography ==
Brown was born in Nanaimo, British Columbia. Her parents were Joseph Miller Brown (1867–1942), and his wife, Rosa Elizabeth Rumming (1872–1960). She wrote her first poem at the age of six years.

In 1944, she was the first female poet awarded the Royal Society of Canada's Lorne Pierce Medal. In 1967, she was made an Officer of the Order of Canada "for her contributions to Canadian poetry".

After about 1950, literary history suddenly dropped Brown from the poetic canon. Despite the accolades, the awards, and the best wishes of those who early on championed her work, and particularly Toronto professor Pelham Edgar—and those who may have played upon the fact that she was crippled by rheumatic fever—she was side-lined by modernism and professional literary critics. She was aware of what was happening, but helpless to stop it. Her failing, she claimed, was that she had no real experience of life.

She was a personal friend of the Canadian poet and civil servant Duncan Campbell Scott late in his life, and he was influential in introducing Pelham Edgar to her poems.

Brown was freelance journalist for the Nanaimo Free Press starting in 1926 and often used the pseudonym the Khoji.

Brown was a 2018 Culture & Heritage Award recipient for Lifetime Cultural Achievement from the City of Nanaimo.

She died in Victoria, British Columbia. A very complete archive of her works, manuscripts, and unpublished material is in the Special Collections of the University of Victoria. The only major summary and analysis of her life and writing career can be found in G. Kim Blank's essay in Arc Poetry Magazine (vol 58), Summer, 2007.

== Selected bibliography ==
- A Dryad in Nanaimo, 1931
- A Dryad in Nanaimo with 11 New Poems, 1934
- The Tree of Resurrection and other poems, 1937
- The Log of a Lame Duck, 1937
- Challenge to Life and Death, 1943
- V-E Day, 1946
- All Fool's Day, 1948
