= The Borribles Go For Broke =

1981 novel by Michael de Larrabeiti

- 2005 edition cover
- Author: Michael de Larrabeiti
- Series: The Borrible Trilogy
- Publication date: 1981
- Media type: Print
- ISBN: 0765350068
- Preceded by: The Borribles
- Followed by: The Borribles: Across the Dark Metropolis

The Borribles Go For Broke is the second volume of the Borrible Trilogy, written by Michael de Larrabeiti and first published in 1981 by The Bodley Head in the United Kingdom.

== Plot ==
Borribles are runaway children whose ears become pointed as they take to the streets, indicators of their independence and intelligence. As long as their ears remain unclipped they will never age; for this reason, they wear woollen hats pulled low over their ears in order to remain undetected by the authorities, who find their freedom threatening to the social order. Borribles are skinny, scruffy, and tough; they have nothing to do with money, and steal what they need to survive.

Following on from the adventures of The Borribles, the second volume of The Borrible Trilogy begins with the surviving adventurers (such as Chalotte and Sydney and Vulge) discovering that Sam the horse is still alive. In attempting to rescue him the Borribles are lured into danger both by the newly-established Special Borrible Group, a branch of the police determined to wipe out the Borribles and their way of life, and by one of their own – Spiff, whose motives behind the mission to Rumbledom are slowly revealed.

All this leads the Borribles deep in to Wendle territory beneath the streets of Wandsworth, and down in to a shifting tunnel of mud dug deep beneath the mudflats of the Wandle River.

== Film adaptation ==
A July 2004 report in Variety revealed that a film based on the entire trilogy was being developed by CUBA Pictures, the film development arm of literary agents Curtis Brown.

== Reception ==
David Langford reviewed The Borribles Go For Broke in the May 1984 issue of White Dwarf, stating:

Sussworth and his minion Sergeant Hanks are brilliantly awful grotesques, like Dickens characters; with their ghastly dedication they'd burn any number of ideologically unsound books, especially this one. Meanwhile the main story is about bloody internecine strife between Borribles, and amounts to a mini-epic. Fine stuff.

== Reviews ==
- Review by Jeff Frane (1982) in Locus, #254 March 1982
- Review by Fred D'Ignazio (1982) in Science Fiction & Fantasy Book Review, #4, May 1982
- Review by Kevin K. Rattan (1982) in Paperback Inferno, Volume 6, Number 1
- Review by Debbie Notkin (1982) in Rigel Science Fiction, #5 Fall 1982
- Review by Paul McGuire (1982) in Science Fiction Review, Winter 1982

== See also ==
- The Borribles - the first volume of The Borrible Trilogy
- The Borribles: Across the Dark Metropolis - the third volume of The Borrible Trilogy
