= The Provençal Tales =

- Author: Michael de Larrabeiti
- Cover artist: Jillian Haines/Michael de Larrabeiti
- Language: English
- Genre: French folklore
- Publisher: Pavilion Books
- Publication date: 1988
- Publication place: United Kingdom
- Media type: Print (Hardback & Paperback)
- Pages: 223 pp
- ISBN: 1-85145-211-7
- OCLC: 59889245

The Provençal Tales is a book written by Michael de Larrabeiti and published in 1988 by Pavilion Books. De Larrabeiti worked on the transhumance in the 1950s and 1960s; his book records stories apparently told to de Larrabeiti by Provençal shepherds.
