= William Arthur Deacon =

Canadian literary critic and editor (1890–1977)

- Born: 6 April 1890; Pembroke, Ontario, Canada
- Died: 5 August 1977 (aged 87); Toronto, Canada
- Education: University of Manitoba
- Occupations: Barrister; literary critic; editor
- Known for: National President, Canadian Authors Association
- Spouses: Gladys Coon (m. 1911); Sally Townsend Syme

William Arthur Deacon (6 April 1890 — 5 August 1977) was a Canadian barrister-at-law, literary critic and editor, widely known throughout Canada and the United States, He was Canada's first book critic to serve in that capacity on a full-time basis. Deacon was a founding member of the Canadian Authors Association, serving as its national president in 1946–1948.

== Early life and education ==
Deacon was born in Pembroke, Ontario on 6 April 1890. His parents were William Henry Deacon and Sarah Annie (Davies).

In 1917, moving to Winnipeg, Manitoba, he studied law at the University of Manitoba.

== Career ==
Deacon worked as a barrister-at-law during the first ten years of his career, after which he "aimed to become the first full-time book reviewer in Canada".

Deacon began writing about books, around 1920, with the publication of articles in The New York Times Book Review and the Literary Review of the New York Evening Post. After a year on the contributing staff of the Manitoba Free Press, he was appointed Editor of The Saturday Evening Citizen, for whom he wrote weekly articles and book reviews. He worked for the Winnipeg Free Press (1921), Saturday Night (1922–1928), The Mail and Empire (1928–1936) and The Globe and Mail (1936–1961). His column at The Globe and Mail was entitled, "The Fly Leaf".

Deacon also found time for occasional contributions to the London Bookman, The American Mercury, the International Book Review, Yearbook of the Arts in Canada (1928-29; 1933-34), Canadian Portraits (1940); Some Canadian Essays (1932); Book of Canadian Humor (1951).

During his six years with The Saturday Evening Citizen, he published four books: Pens and Pirates, Peter McArthur, Poteen, and The Four Jameses. Later, he published two additional ones, Open House (1931), My Vision of Canada (1933), and a pamphlet, "Here Comes the Censor" (1940).

In 1960, Deacon retired from the Globe and Mail when he was seventy.

According to Stouck & Stouch (2010), in his day, Deacon was considered to be the "most influential literary critic in the country". The Waterloo Region Record described him as "for 40 years an intellectual patron and prophet in Canadian writing". The Brantford Expositor, speaking editorially, wrote: "Mr. Deacon has no peer in Canada as a critical book reviewer of understanding." Deacon's articles on the latest books appeared each Saturday in The Whig-Standard.

== Personal life ==
In 1911, he firstly married Gladys Coon of Weston, Ontario. They divorced. About 1923, he secondly married the writer and theosophist, Mrs. Sally Townsend Syme.

In 1918, Deacon served as President of the Theosophical Society's Winnipeg Lodge.

== Death and legacy ==
William Arthur Deacon died on 5 August 1977 in Toronto.

His biographer, Jessie L. Beattie, published William Arthur Deacon, Memoirs of a Literary Friendship in 1978 (The Fleming Press, Hamilton, Ontario). Clara Thomas and John Lennox published William Arthur Deacon: A Canadian Literary Life in 1982. (University of Toronto Press). Dear Bill, The Correspondence of William Arthur Deacon was edited by John Lennox and Michele Lacombe (University of Toronto Press, 1988).

== Selected works ==
- Pens and Pirates (1923)
- Peter McArthur (1923)
- Poteen and Other Essays (1926)
- The Four Jameses (1927)
- My vision of Canada (1933)
- Open House (1931)

=== Pamphlets ===
- "Sh-hh. Here Comes the Censor!" (1940)
