= The Borribles: Across the Dark Metropolis =

Book trilogy by Michael de Larrabeiti

- First edition
- Author: Michael de Larrabeiti
- Genre: Fantasy Novel
- Publisher: Piccolo Books
- Publication date: 1986
- Media type: Print (Paperback)
- Pages: 297 pp (paperback 2005 Tor Edition)
- ISBN: 0765350076 (paperback 2005 Tor Edition)
- Preceded by: The Borribles Go For Broke

The Borribles: Across the Dark Metropolis is the third volume of the Borrible Trilogy, written by Michael de Larrabeiti and first published in 1986 by Piccolo Books in the United Kingdom.

== Plot summary ==
Borribles are runaway children whose ears become pointed as they take to the streets, indicators of their independence and intelligence. As long as their ears remain unclipped they will never age; for this reason, they wear woollen hats pulled low over their ears in order to remain undetected by the authorities, who find their freedom threatening to the social order. Borribles are skinny, scruffy, and tough; they have nothing to do with money, and steal what they need to survive.

In The Borriles: Across the Dark Metropolis, the third book in The Borrible Trilogy, Battersea is no longer safe for a Borrible. The SBG, a section of the London police driven on by the fanatical Inspector Sussworth and dedicated to finding Borribles and clipping their ears is determined to wipe them out. The Borribles decide to escort Sam the horse to safety in Neasden and then return to the old way of life of independence and freedom. They begin their journey Across the Dark Metropolis, a journey that tests the courage and cunning of the Adventurers to the limits.

== Film adaptation ==
While a July 2004 report in Variety revealed that a film based on the entire trilogy was being developed by CUBA Pictures, the film development arm of literary agents Curtis Brown, as of 2022 no such film can be found at IMDb, Variety Insight, nor other such online databases of information related to films.

== Reception ==
David Langford reviewed The Borribles: Across the Dark Metropolis in the December 1986 issue of White Dwarf, stating:

Again London's underside is the nightmare background for a quest, and the torturous journey from Battersea to Neasden has a far higher death toll than that relatively cosy toddle though Mordor. Triumph is bloody (especially in the luridly detailed Camden slaughterhouse) and expensive.

== Reviews ==
- Review by Faren Miller (1987) in Locus, #315 April 1987

== See also ==
- The Borrible Trilogy
- The Borribles Go For Broke: the second volume in The Borrible Trilogy
