= Dusty Owl =

- Formation: 1994
- Type: arts/poetry organization based in Canada
- Legal status: active
- Purpose: advocate and public voice, educator and network
- Headquarters: Ottawa, Ontario, Canada
- Region served: Canada
- Official language: English, French

Dusty Owl is a poetry collective operating in Ottawa, Ontario, Canada.

== History ==
The Dusty Owl Reading Series was first launched in 1994 by Steve Zytveld, then president of the English Literature Society at Carleton University. The event was hosted monthly at Café Wim on Sussex Drive in downtown Ottawa until 1999.

In 2004, the Dusty Owl Reading Series was revived with many of its original participants as the organizational force. Steve Zytveld and his wife Catherine MacDonald-Zytveld (an Ottawa-area mixed-media artist and photographer) co-host the event on the third Sunday of every month at Swizzles Bar and Grill in downtown Ottawa.

The reading series has hosted poets and authors from across Canada and the United States; featured readers have included George Elliot Clarke, Hal Niedzviecki, Rob McLennan, John Akpata, Suzanne Buffam, William Hawkins, and Sean Moreland.

The Dusty Owl Small Press publishes a quarterly chapbook literary magazine, The Dusty Owl Quarterly, as well as a biannual zine featuring horror and dark science fiction literary genres. The press publishes short collections of poetry and prose, largely by Canadian writers and artists.
