= The Bunce =

1980 novel by Michael de Larrabeiti

- First edition
- Author: Michael de Larrabeiti
- Language: English
- Genre: Novel
- Publisher: Michael Joseph
- Publication date: 1980
- Publication place: United Kingdom
- Media type: Print (Hardback)
- Pages: 159 pp
- ISBN: 0-7181-1881-2

The Bunce is a mystery fiction novel written by Michael de Larrabeiti and published in the United Kingdom in 1980 by Michael Joseph.

== Synopsis ==
Protagonist Billy Jay is trapped in an insurance related fraud conducted by gangsters, insurance agents, and corrupt police officers.
