= Christopher Meades =

Canadian writer

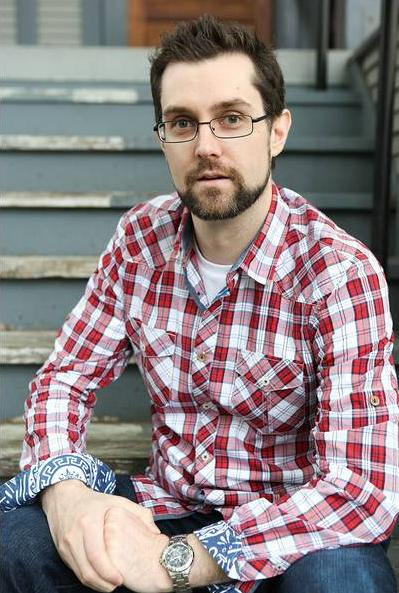
- Born: May 8, 1974
- Citizenship: Canada

Christopher Meades is the Vancouver author of four novels, including The Last Hiccup (2012), which won the 2013 Canadian Authors Association Award for Fiction.

His story The Walking Lady won the 2009 Toyon fiction prize and his short fiction has been published in such literary journals as The Fiddlehead, The Dalhousie Review, Upstreet, Toyon, The Feathertale Review and Canadian Stories.

== List of published works ==
=== Novels ===
- Hanna Who Fell From The Sky, Park Row Books, September 2017
- For The Love of Mary, ECW Press, June 2016, ISBN 1-55022-974-5
- The Last Hiccup, ECW Press, 2012, ISBN 1-55022-973-7
- The Three Fates of Henrik Nordmark, ECW Press, 2010, ISBN 1-55022-972-9

=== Short stories ===
- "Diary of an AHL Prospect" in Upstreet, 2016
- "Naked Girls & the Grinch" in The Fiddlehead, 2012
- "Video Poker Bar in Vegas" in Best of The Potomac Review, 2011
- "A Bad Day for the Zebras" in The Dalhousie Review, 2011
- "Alive in India" in The Sierra Nevada Review, 2011
- "Into The Woodwork" in The Offbeat, 2010
- "The Matchmaker" in The Feathertale Review, 2010
- "Struck" in The Penguin Review, 2010
- "Video Poker Bar in Vegas" in The Potomac Review, 2010
- "The Attractive Cashier" in The Feathertale Review, 2010
- "Sirens & the Silences" in Thema, 2010
- "Leave" in Night Chills, 2010
- "Unrelenting Agony of Francis" in Puffin Circus, 2009
- "The Heist" in Nonymous, 2009
- "The Isirk Ballroom" in Read This, 2009
- "Dear Heartless Bastards" in Hacksaw Arts Magazine, 2009
- "I'm Afraid of Toronto" in Canadian Stories, 2009
- "Five Seven of Hearts" in Delivered (UK), 2009
- "Hold On" in Welter, 2009
- "Henrik Nordmark (excerpt)" in The Feathertale Review, 2009
- "Hiccups" in The Delinquent, 2009
- "The Walking Lady" in Toyon, 2009
- "Widow's Waltz" in Inscape, 2009
- "Widow's Reflection" in Write On, 2009
- "Henrik Nordmark (excerpt)" in The Delinquent (UK), 2008
- "Henrik Nordmark (excerpt) in Inch (Bull City Press), 2008
- "Outsourced" in Cause & Effect, 2008
- "The Rosalina Parlour" in Write On, 2008
- "Serial Thriller Chapter Seven" in The Vancouver Province, 2008

== Awards and honours ==
- Winner of the 2013 Canadian Authors Association Award for Fiction for The Last Hiccup.
- Winner of the 2009 Toyon Short Fiction Prize.
