= The Hollywood Takes =

1988 novel by Michael de Larrabeiti

- First edition
- Author: Michael de Larrabeiti
- Cover artist: Catherine Jenkins
- Language: English
- Genre: Novel
- Publisher: Doubleday
- Publication date: 1988
- Publication place: United Kingdom
- Media type: Print (Hardback & Paperback)
- Pages: 190 pp
- ISBN: 0-385-24622-6
- OCLC: 17296679
- Dewey Decimal: 823/.914 19
- LC Class: PR6054.E134 H65 1988

The Hollywood Takes is a novel written by the English author Michael de Larrabeiti and published in the United States by Doubleday in 1988.
