= Journal of a Sad Hermaphrodite =

1992 book by Michael de Larrabeiti

- First edition
- Author: Michael de Larrabeiti
- Cover artist: Craig Dodd
- Language: English
- Publisher: Aidan Ellis
- Publication date: 1992
- Publication place: United Kingdom
- Media type: Print (Hardback)
- Pages: 165 pp
- ISBN: 0-85628-200-6
- OCLC: 59958271

Journal of a Sad Hermaphrodite is a book written by the English writer Michael de Larrabeiti and published in the United Kingdom by Aidan Ellis in 1992. It is currently out of print, but was due to be republished in quarter 4 2006/quarter 1 2007 by Tallis House.

Supposedly reproduced from a manuscript constructed by Cooper, a teacher of English Literature in a secondary school in a small Oxfordshire town, the Journal includes clippings from Cooper's commonplace book, clippings from the diary of one of Cooper's students (who is not named) and excerpts of poetry and other well-known texts. The Journal is perhaps influenced by Cyril Connolly's The Unquiet Grave in this respect, although it modifies Connolly's use of the "commonplace book" technique – itself perhaps borrowed by Connolly from George Gissing's The Private Papers of Henry Ryecroft – to produce a more traditional narrative.

This Journal narrates the final school year of the student whose diary is included in the text, and reflects on various themes, many of which are to do with individual morality: how, and why, one makes the choices one does and lives the life one lives. The overarching theme of the text, which connects the narratives of Cooper and his student – who together make up the "Hermaphrodite" of the title, is perhaps that of writing: how to write, why to write, and what to write. This theme could be seen to be a further influence from Cyril Connolly, who considers his own failure to produce a major work of literature in his Enemies of Promise.

== Texts cited in Journal of a Sad Hermaphrodite ==
- A Portrait by Robert Louis Stevenson. Cited on page 4.
- "Narcissus" from the Classical Dictionary by John Lemprière. 6-7.
- Drunk as Drunk by Pablo Neruda. 8.
- ??? by William Golding. 8.
- A Humble Remonstrance by Robert Louis Stevenson. 9.
- ??? by Robert Nichols. 10.
