= Canadian Authors Association =

Canadian writers organization

The Canadian Authors Association is Canada's oldest association for writers and authors. The organization publishes several periodicals, organizes local chapters and events for Canadian writers, and sponsors writing awards, including the Governor General's Awards.

== History ==
The Canadian Authors Association was founded in 1921. The founding organizers included John Murray Gibbon, Bernard Keble Sandwell, Stephen Leacock, and Pelham Edgar. By the end of its first year the organization had more than 700 members.

In its early years the association was known for its conservative views on literature and its support of traditional writing genres, including colourful idealized stories in quaint local settings. Local chapters of the CAA organized activities to encourage and develop the skills of Canadian writers, including study groups, readings, and workshops.

In 1919, the CAA founded a magazine, Canadian Bookman. In 1936, the association founded Canadian Poetry, edited by E. J. Pratt.

The Canadian Authors Association discussed the idea of awards with Governor General Lord Tweedsmuir (1935-1940) who approved the use of the name of his office in the establishment of the Governor General's Awards in 1936, the first ones being awarded in 1937. They remain Canada's highest literary award, as well as the Canadian Authors Association Awards.

=== Notable presidents ===
- William Arthur Deacon (1946–48), literary critic and editor; Canada's first book critic to serve in that capacity on a full-time basis.
- Will R. Bird (c. 1949–1950), writer, author, recipient of Ryerson Fiction Award
- W. G. Hardy (1950–1952), Professor of Classics at University of Alberta, president of the International Ice Hockey Federation, Member of the Order of Canada
- Charles Bruce Fergusson (1975–1978), Provincial Archivist of Nova Scotia, Member of the Order of Canada

== Awards ==
The Canadian Authors Awards, originally known as Canadian Authors Association or CAA Awards and now occasionally called Literary Awards, were created in 1975 to fill in for the Governor General’s medals, as these were overtaken by the Canada Council for the Arts, and were presented in multiple categories to authors who are Canadian born or permanent residents. The following is an incomplete list of winners of the award, originally given out in three categories (fiction, poetry and drama), before the category Canadian History and the Emerging Writer Award were added in 1997 and 2006. After 2017 all categories were discontinued and replaced by the Canadian Authors Fred Kerner Award, which had already been accoladed the first time in 2016.

CAA Award for Fiction (1975–2017)

- 1975 Fred Stenson for Lonesome Hero
- 1976 none
- 1977 Carol Shields for Small Ceremonies
- 1978 Jane Rule for The Young in One Another's Arms
- 1979 Marian Engel for The Glassy Sea
- 1980 none
- 1981 Hugh MacLennan for Voices in Time
- 1982 Joy Kogawa for Obasan
- 1983 W.P. Kinsella for Shoeless Joe
- 1984 Heather Robertson for Willie: A Romance: Volume 1 of the King Years
- 1985 Timothy Findley for Not Wanted on the Voyage
- 1986 Robertson Davies for What's Bred in the Bone (Cornish Trilogy, #2)
- 1987 none
- 1988 Brian Moore for The Colour of Blood
- 1989 Joan Clark for The Victory Of Geraldine Gull
- 1990 James Houston for Running West
- 1991 David Adams Richards for Evening Snow Will Bring Such Peace
- 1992 Alberto Manguel for News From A Foreign Country Came
- 1993 Neil Bissoondath for Innocence Of Age
- 1994 Margaret Atwood for The Robber Bride
- 1995 Bernice Morgan for Waiting for Time (Random Passage, #2)
- 1996 L. R. Wright for Mother Love (Karl Alberg #7)
- 1997 Ann-Marie MacDonald for Fall on Your Knees
- 1998 Rita Donovan for Landed
- 1999 Wayne Johnston for The Colony of Unrequited Dreams
- 2000 Alistair MacLeod for No Great Mischief
- 2001 Elizabeth Hay for A Student of Weather
- 2002 Will Ferguson for Happiness
- 2003 Rohinton Mistry for Family Matters
- 2004 Douglas Coupland for Hey Nostradamus!
- 2005 Jeffrey Moore for The Memory Artists
- 2006 Joseph Boyden for Three Day Road
- 2007 Richard Wagamese for Dream Wheels
- 2008 Paulette Jiles for Stormy Weather
- 2009 Nino Ricci for The Origin of Species
- 2010 Michael Crummey for Galore
- 2011 Tom Rachman for The Imperfectionists
- 2012 Patrick deWitt for The Sisters Brothers
- 2013 Christopher Meades for The Last Hiccup
- 2014 Joseph Boyden for The Orenda
- 2015 Miriam Toews for All My Puny Sorrows
- 2016 Nino Ricci for Sleep
- 2017 Alissa York for The Naturalist

CAA Award for Poetry (1975–2017)

- 1975 Tom Wayman for For and Against the Moon
- 1976 Jim Green for North Book
- 1977 Sid Stephen for Beothuck Poems
- 1978 Alden Nowlan forSmoked Glass
- 1979 Andrew Suknaski for The Ghosts You Call Poor
- 1980 Michael Ondaatje for There's a Trick with a Knife I’m Learning to Do: Poems, 1963–1978
- 1981 Leona Gom for Land of The Peace
- 1982 Gary Geddes for the acid test
- 1983 George Amabile for the presence of fire
- 1984 Don McKay for Birding or Desire
- 1985 Leonard Cohen for Book of Mercy
- 1986 P. K. Page for The Glass Air
- 1987 Al Purdy for The Collected Poems 1956–1986
- 1988 Pat Lane for Selected Poems
- 1989 Bruce Rice for Daniel
- 1990 Don Bailey for Homeless Heart
- 1991 Richard Lemm for Prelude to the Bacchanal
- 1992 Anne Michaels for Miner's Pond
- 1993 Lorna Crozier for Inventing the Hawk
- 1994 George Bowering for George Bowering Selected Poems
- 1995 Tim Lilburn for Moosehead Sandhills
- 1996 Di Brandt for Jerusalem, beloved
- 1997 E.D. Blodgett for Apostrophes: woman at a piano
- 1998 Anne Szumigalski for On Glassy Wings
- 1999 Janice Kulyk Keefer for Marrying the Sea
- 2000 Helen Humphreys for Anthem
- 2001 Carmine Starnino for Credo
- 2002 Tim Bowling for Darkness and Silence
- 2003 Margaret Avison for Concrete and Wild Carrot
- 2004 Chris Banks for Bonfires
- 2005 Peter Trower for Haunted Hills and Hanging Valleys
- 2006 Barry Dempster for The Burning Alphabet
- 2007 Sarah Klassen for A Curious Beatitude
- 2008 Asa Boxer for The Mechanical Bird
- 2009 Elise Partridge for Chameleon Hours
- 2010 Tom Dawe for Where Genesis Begins
- 2011 Julia McCarthy for Return from Erebus
- 2012 Goran Simić for Sunrise in the Eyes of the Snowman
- 2013 Don McKay for Paradoxides
- 2014 Renée Sarojini Saklikar for children of air india
- 2015 Tim Bowling for Circa Nineteen Hundred and Grief
- 2016 Joe Denham for Regeneration Machine
- 2017 Johanna Skibsrud for The Description of the World

CAA Award for Canadian History (1997–2017)

- 1997 Phil Jenkins for An Acre of Time
- 1998 Dorothy Harley Eber for Images of Justice
- 1999 Rod McQueen for The Eatons
- 2000 D’Arcy Jenish for Indian Fall (The Last Great Days of the Plains Cree and the Blackfoot Confederacy)
- 2001 Will Ferguson for Canadian History for Dummies
- 2002 Ken McGoogan for Fatal Passage: The Untold Story of John Rae, the Arctic Adventurer Who Discovered the Fate of Franklin
- 2003 Derek Hayes for Historical Atlas of Canada
- 2004 Ishmael Alunik, Eddie D. Kolausok and David Morrison for Across Time and Tundra: The Inuvialuit of the Western Arctic
- 2005 Charlotte Gray for The Museum Called Canada
- 2006 J.L. Granatstein for The Last Good War
- 2007 Mark Zuehlke for For Honour's Sake: the War of 1812 and the Brokering of an Uneasy Peace
- 2008 Robert Wright for Three Nights in Havana
- 2009 J.M. Bumsted for Lord Selkirk: A Life
- 2010 Jonathan F. Vance for A History of Canadian Culture
- 2011 Shelagh D. Grant for Polar Imperative: A History of Arctic Sovereignty in North America
- 2012 Richard Gwyn for Nation Maker: Sir John A. MacDonald: His Life, Our Times, Volume Two: 1867–1891
- 2013 Michael S. Cross for A Biography of Robert Baldwin: The Morning-Star of Memory
- 2014 Charlotte Gray for The Massey Murder: A Maid, Her Master and the Trial that Shocked a Nation
- 2015 Robert Wright for The Night Canada Stood Still
- 2016 Debra Komer for The Bastard of Fort Stikine: The Hudson's Bay Company and the Murder of John McLoughlin Jr.
- 2017 Charlotte Gray for The Promise of Canada

CAA Emerging Writer Award (2006–2017)

- 2011 Titilope Sonuga for Down to Earth
- 2012 Ryan Flavelle for The Patrol: Seven Days in the Life of a Canadian Soldier in Afghanistan
- 2013 Tie: Claire Battershill for several fiction, poetry and review works and Jay Bahadur for journalistic work and The Pirates of Somalia
- 2014 Grace O'Connell for Magnified World
- 2015 Kim Fu for For Today I Am a Boy
- 2016 Kayla Czaga for For Your Safety Please Hold On
- 2017 Eva Crocker for several anthology stories

CAA Award for Drama (1975–prior 2017)

- 1985 Ken Mitchell for Gone The Burning Sun
- 1992 Drew Hayden Taylor for The Bootlegger Blues: A Play
- 1993 Guy Vanderhaeghe for I Had A Job I Liked. Once: A Play

Canadian Authors Fred Kerner Award

- 2016 Caroline Vu for Palawan Story
- 2017 Margo Wheaton for The Unlit Path Behind the House
- 2018 Ahmad Danny Ramadan for The Clothesline Swing
- 2019 Maureen Medved for Black Star
- 2020 Adrienne Drobnies for Salt and Ashes
- 2021 Joanna Lilley for Endlings
- 2022 Catherine Graham for Æther: An Out-of-Body Lyric
- 2023 Sophie Jai for Wild Fires
- 2024 Lucian Childs for Dreaming Home
