= Richard Lemm =

Poet and professor based in Prince Edward Island

Richard Lemm (born 1946) is a poet and professor based in Prince Edward Island. He was born in Seattle, immigrated to Canada in 1967, and moved to Atlantic Canada in 1979. He has an MA in English from Queen's University and a PhD from Dalhousie University.

Richard has been teaching Canadian and Postcolonial literatures and Creative Writing at University of Prince Edward Island since 1986.

== Publications ==
=== Poetry ===
- Jeopardy: Poems. Charlottetown, PEI: Acorn, 2018.
- The Gold Flash. North Vancouver, BC: Alfred Gustav Press, 2011.
- Burning House. Hamilton, ON: Wolsak and Wynn, 2010.
- Four Ways of Dealing with Bullies. Toronto, ON: Wolsak and Wynn, 2000.
- Prelude to the Bacchanal. Charlottetown, PEI: Ragweed Press, 1990.
- A Difficult Faith. Porters Lake, NS: Pottersfield Press, 1985.
- Dancing in Asylum. Porters Lake, NS: Pottersfield Press, 1982.

=== Non-fiction memoir ===
- Imagined Truths: Myths from a Draft-Dodging Poet. Vancouver, BC: Tidewater Press, 2021.

=== Fiction ===
- Shape of Things to Come. Charlottetown, PEI: Acorn, 2007.

=== Edited ===
- Riptides: New Island Fiction. Charlottetown, PEI: Acorn, 2012.
- Snow Softly Falling: Holiday Stories from Prince Edward Island. Charlottetown, PEI: Acorn, 2015.

=== Non-fiction biography ===
- Milton Acorn: In Love and Anger. Ottawa, ON: Carleton University Press, 1999.

== Awards ==
- Winner of P.E.I. Book Award 2020, for Jeopardy
- Winner of P.E.I. Book Award 2014, for Riptides: New Island Fiction
- Winner of P.E.I. Book Award 2014, for Shape of Things to Come
- Shortlisted for Atlantic Book Award 2013, for Riptides: New Island Fiction
- Winner of the P.E.I. Heritage and Museum Foundation Award, for Milton Acorn: In Love and Anger
- Winner of Canadian Authors’ Association Award 1991, for Prelude to the Bacchanal
