= Alfred Garneau =

Canadian poet

Alfred Garneau (December 20, 1836–1904) was a poet who was born in Lower Canada. His father was François-Xavier Garneau.

== Garneau's Life ==
Alfred was the eldest son of François-Xavier Garneau (1809-1866). Alfred was a well-educated young boy, who went to a seminary and was called in 1860. After the seminary, he then studied to become a lawyer. In 1861 he joined the Canadian civil service, and was appointed to Chief French Translator for the Senate of Canada in 1873.

His grandson Hector de Saint-Denys Garneau (1912-1943) was a poet and painter.

== Garneau's Works ==
Alfred Garneau's works include the Le Foyer Canadien, Histoire du Canada, and Poésies. Alfred worked on these articles as an editor and as an author, some say he had co-written these books, while others say he had others write for him.
