= French Leave (de Larrabeiti book) =

Collection of memoirs by Michael de Larrabeiti

- First edition
- Author: Michael de Larrabeiti
- Language: English
- Genre: Memoirs
- Publisher: Robert Hale
- Publication date: 2003
- Publication place: United Kingdom
- Media type: Print (Hardback & Paperback)
- Pages: 224 pp
- ISBN: 0-7090-7172-8
- OCLC: 51031583

French Leave is a collection of memoirs written by the English author Michael de Larrabeiti. It was published in 2003 in the United Kingdom by Robert Hale.
