= Pelham Edgar =

Canadian literary critic (1871–1948)

Oscar Pelham Edgar
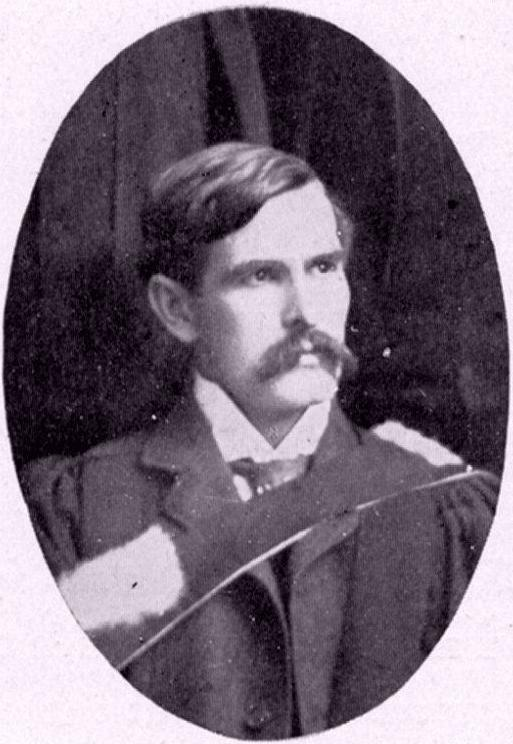
- Edgar in 1909, from Acta Victoriana, magazine of Victoria College, Toronto
- Born: 17 March 1871; Toronto, Ontario, Canada
- Died: 7 October 1948 (aged 77); Canton, Ontario, on 7 October 1948
- Occupation: Professor of English
- Known for: Canadian Writers’ Foundation

Oscar Pelham Edgar (17 March 1871 – 7 October 1948) was a Canadian teacher. He was a full professor and head of the Department of English at the Victoria College, Toronto from 1910 to 1938. He wrote many articles and several monographs on English literature. He had a talent for identifying and encouraging promising new authors. He was an active member of various literary societies, and was the force behind the establishment of the Canadian Writers’ Foundation to help needy authors.

== Early years ==
Oscar Pelham Edgar was born on 17 March 1871, second son of James David Edgar and Matilda Ridout Edgar. Both his parents were greatly interested in literature. His father, a lawyer and Liberal politician, was a minor poet. His mother was a historian and feminist. Her biography of Sir Isaac Brock was published in 1904 as a volume in the Makers of Canada series. Pellham Edgar was educated at Upper Canada College. He attended the University of Toronto, where he was a student of W.J. Alexander. He graduated from University College in 1892 with the Governor-General's Medal in Modern Languages.

Pelham Edgar taught at Upper Canada College from 1892 to 1895. In 1893 he married Helen Madeline Boulton. Edgar left Upper Canada College to study at Johns Hopkins University in Baltimore, Maryland, where he earned a PhD in 1897. His thesis was about Shelley, a poet who had inspired him as a boy.

The poet Duncan Campbell Scott (1862–1947) was a close friend of Pelham Edgar, and they maintained a correspondence for more than fifty years, starting in the 1890s. Edgar often criticized Scott's major poems before they were published. Scott worked in the Department of Indian Affairs. Scott and Edgar traveled together in Northern Ontario in 1906 on an expedition to make treaties with the Native Americans. Edgar was said to have been acting as secretary, but in fact the trip seems to have been more a holiday.

In the 1900s Edgar and Scott were invited to edit the Makers of Canada series of historical biographies published by George Morang. Neither were particularly well qualified. Edgar had edited a selection of writings by Francis Parkman (1823–1893), but was more interested by the picturesque than the historical elements. He was criticized for his casual editing. In the end most of the serious editing was done by William Dawson LeSueur. The friendship lasted, and Edgar published eight articles on Scott's work between 1895 and 1948.

== Teacher ==
In 1897 Edgar became a lecturer in the Department of French at Victoria College, Toronto. He was head of the department from 1901 to 1910. In 1902 he started to also give lectures in the Department of English. He taught in the Department of English after 1909, and headed the department from 1912 until he retired in 1938.

Pelham Edgar had an instinctive ability to detect talent. When judging the poetry competition of 1904 Edgar was struck by the work of Marjorie Pickthall (1883–1922), and advised her on her poems. They began to be published regularly in the college's Acta Victoriana literary journal. In 1920 he invited the poet E. J. Pratt (1882–1964), then a demonstrator-lecturer in psychology at the university, to join the faculty of the Department of English. Pratt was promoted to Professor in 1930 and then Senior Professor in 1938, the year that Edgar retired. Raymond Knister wanted to dedicate his My Star Predominant to Edgar, who he said had first awoken his interest in poetry.

In 1928 Edgar "discovered" the poet Audrey Alexandra Brown (1904–1998), and promoted her career from then until 1939. Edgar's students Kathleen Coburn and Northrop Frye both acknowledged the influence he had on their careers. Coburn says of a 1928 course by Edgar on English Romantic poetry, that he introduced "... the whole business of the imagination, for me a first glimmering notion, the first articulation of something felt but never expressed." Frye dedicated his Fearful Symmetry book about William Blake to Edgar. George Benson Johnston (1913–2004), the poet, was another of Edgar's students.

As a critic Edgar was primarily interested in the evolution of technique and form of novels. He explored Henry James's changing theories of fiction in his 1927 book Henry James, Man and Author. Leon Edel said of his 1933 The Art of the Novel that Edgar was "one of the first in modern scholarship to write cogently and importantly about the novel form." He was wary about some modern trends in poetry. He called free association a disease, and said psychoanalytic theory was "wholly valueless for poetry."

== Other activities ==
Pelham Edgar was a member of the Athenaeum Club, London, England. Edgar was president of the Tennyson Club, Toronto, and president of the Modern Language Association, Ontario. He was secretary of the Ontario Education Society from 1908 to 1909. In 1915 he became a Fellow of the Royal Society of Canada. In 1936 he received the Royal Society's Lorne Pierce Medal for distinguished service to Canadian literature. A description of Edgar around 1926 said, "He was then in his middle fifties, tall and spare, with piercing dark eyes under thick eyebrows and a wealth of lustrous black hair. His aquiline nose surmounted the largest black mustache I had ever seen – it was difficult not to stare at in fascination."

Pelham Edgar was secretary of the Canadian Society of Authors. He was among the founders of the Canadian Authors Association, which first met on 12 March 1921 in the Old Medical Building of McGill University. In April he met with members of the recently formed Canadian Society of Authors to present the more ambitious program of the Canadian Authors Association. The Society decided to retain its charter, but hoped to find a way to merge with the Association's Toronto branch. In 1935 he became ninth national president of the Canadian Authors Association. In 1936 Edgar launched the Canadian Poetry Magazine, and also initiated the Governor General's Awards. He became the first president of the Association of Canadian Bookmen in 1936, an organization dedicated to supporting the booksellers and distributors in Canada. The Bookmen organized their first National Book Fair in Toronto in the fall of 1936 in the King Edward Hotel, Toronto.

In 1931 Edgar created the Canadian Authors Foundation to provide a perpetual fund "for the benefit of any men or women of distinction in Canadian letters (or their dependents) ... in destitution." At his request Lord Bessborough, the Governor-General of Canada, was the first patron of the society. However, during the Great Depression it had difficulty obtaining funds. The first beneficiary of the Writers Foundation was Sir Charles G.D. Roberts, who had followed the custom of the time in selling his books outright to publishers. In his old age he was poverty-stricken. The Foundation obtained a government grant, but it expired when Sir Charles died. Edgar succeeded Sir Robert Falconer as president of the foundation in 1943 and led a thrust to have it incorporated as the Canadian Writers’ Foundation in 1945. Pelham Edgar told the 1945 convention of the Canadian Authors Association of the lack of funds. A levy of 50 cents a year from the CAA members was proposed but rejected. However, contributions in excess of this amount continued to be given by CAA branches and individual members. (Note: After Pelham Edgar died he was succeeded by Terry Thomson as organizer and chief fundraiser for the Canadian Authors Foundation. Over the next thirty years she managed to gather almost $200,000. The Pelham Edgar Memorial Fund is now largely able to provide pensions to beneficiaries out of interest earnings.)

Edgar's first wife died in 1933, and in 1935 he married Dona Gertrude Cameron Waller. They had one daughter. Pelham Edgar died in Canton, Ontario, on 7 October 1948. He was aged 77. Northrop Frye, who became a professor of the English department, edited a collection of his essays for posthumous publication. Frye described Pelham Edgar as a "uniquely important figure in Canadian letters." Bernard Keble Sandwell later joked that Edgar was so influential that the P.E.N. Club of Toronto took its initials from "Pelham Edgar's Nominees." (Note: P.E.N. in fact originally stood for Poets, Essayists and Novelists.) E.K. Brown wrote, "No academic figure has done more to foster Canadian literature than Pelham Edgar.

== Works ==
Edgar published many reviews and articles. Publications include:

- Edgar, Pelham (1899). A study of Shelley: With special reference to his nature poetry. Haskell House. GGKEY:59ZRZF91D7S.
- Edgar, Pelham (1902). Coleridge and Wordsworth Select Poems Prescribed for the Matriculation and Departmental Examinations for 1903 Edited with Introduction and Notes. Morang Educational Company. ISBN 978-1-175-63589-1.
- Parkman, Francis; Edgar, Pelham (1902). The Struggle for a Continent. Edited from the Writings of F. Parkman, by P. Edgar, Etc. Cambridge, U.S.A: Macmillan & Company.
- Edgar, Pelham (1904). Shelley's Debt to Eighteenth Century Thought.
- Tennyson, Alfred; Edgar, Pelham (1906). Tennyson: Select Poems Edited with Introduction and Notes. Morang Educational Company. ISBN 978-1-245-17019-2.
- Buehler, Huber Gray; Edgar, Pelham (1907). A Modern English Grammar. Morang Educational Company. p. 186. ISBN 978-1-175-36937-6.
- Meilhac, Henri; Edgar, Pelham; Halévy, Ludovic (1907). L'Été de Saint-Martin ... Edited by Pelham Edgar. With a vocabulary by A.F.B. Clark.
- Hugo, Victor; Edgar, Pelham; Squair, John (1911). The Poetry of Victor Hugo. Boston: Ginn. ISBN 978-1-171-55534-6.
- Edgar, Pelham (1911). Canadian Literature. Victoria University Students Administration Council.
- Edgar, Pelham (1916). "Canada". Cambridge History of English Literature.
- Edgar, Pelham (1916). The Comedy of Shakespeare and Molière.
- Edgar, Pelham (1925). Henry James: Man and Author. London: Grant Richards.
- Edgar, Pelham (1933). The art of the novel from 1700 to the present time. Macmillan.
- Edgar, Pelham (1939). The Enigma of Yeats. p. 422.
- Edgar, Pelham (1947). Sir Andrew MacPhail.
- Edgar, Pelham (1952). Northrop Frye (ed.). Across My Path. Autobiographical writings. Ryerson Press. p. 167.
- Dictionary of National Biography. Canadian adviser. 1911.
- Edgar, Pelham. The Aspects of Poetry.
