= Michael de Larrabeiti =

English novelist, travel writer (1934–2008)

- Born: 18 August 1934; Lambeth, London, England, United Kingdom
- Died: 18 April 2008 (aged 73); Oxford, England, United Kingdom
- Education: Trinity College, Dublin; Keble College, Oxford
- Occupations: Novelist, travel writer
- Writing career
- Language: English
- Genres: Fantasy literature, new weird
- Notable work: The Borrible Trilogy

Michael de Larrabeiti (18 August 1934 – 18 April 2008) was an English novelist and travel writer. He is best known for writing The Borrible Trilogy, which has been cited as an influence by writers in the new weird movement.

== Early life ==
One of five children, de Larrabeiti was born in St Thomas' Hospital and was mostly brought up in Battersea, South London. His mother was of working-class Irish descent and lived most of her life in the Lavender Hill area of London; his father was a Basque from Bilbao and was often absent.

In 1939 he was evacuated to Arundel in West Sussex, before returning to London in 1940, only to be evacuated again to Askern, a mining village near Doncaster in Yorkshire, in the winter. At the end of the Second World War he returned to London and, after failing the 11-plus, was educated at Clapham Central Secondary School. The teachers he had here, often men who had returned from fighting in the war determined to make a better world, were a great influence on de Larrabeiti, something he would later fictionalise in Journal of a Sad Hermaphrodite.

== Youth ==
After leaving school at sixteen, de Larrabeiti initially worked as a librarian at a public library on Magdalen Road in Earlsfield, south London. In 1952 he began attending Battersea Polytechnic with a view towards taking A-Levels and attending university. This ambition took nine years to fulfill, mainly because of economic reasons. During this period de Larrabeiti, guided by his elder brothers, worked at many things, initially as a cinema projectionist in a 3D cinema in Festival Gardens, Battersea Park during the Festival of Britain. His experiences in the Gardens are recorded in A Rose Beyond the Thames. He later worked as a cameraman in documentary films and as a travel guide in France and Morocco.

In 1959 he fell in with a group of Provençal shepherds and went with them on the transhumance, herding three thousand sheep from their winter pasture to summer pasture in the French Alps. He then taught English in Casablanca, and in 1961 was the photographer on the University of Oxford's Marco Polo Expedition, travelling four months overland on a pair of BSA motorcycles and sidecar with Stanley Johnson and Tim Severin to Afghanistan and India. The adventure led to the publication of Severin's 1964 book Tracking Marco Polo with photographs by de Larrabeiti.

Between 1961 and 1965 he read French and English at Trinity College Dublin, from where he won a scholarship to the École Normale Supérieure in Paris, where he studied in 1965–66; he later began a DPhil at Keble College, Oxford which he later abandoned to take up full-time writing.

== Writing career ==
De Larrabeiti continued to work as a guide and tour manager in the travel business for Clarksons and, later, as a freelance contributor to the Sunday Times travel section, for which he wrote acclaimed travel essays. His books have also been critically well-received, with recent work being long-listed for the Booker Prize. 2006 saw the publication of his most recent novel, Princess Diana's Revenge; a collection of memoirs entitled Spots of Time was published in early 2007. His 1992 novel Journal of a Sad Hermaphrodite is also set to be republished, after having been out of print for over ten years.

In his early years he espoused Marxism and remained a left-winger throughout his life. He lived in the Oxfordshire village of Great Milton with his wife Celia, and had three daughters. The last years of his life were blighted by cancer. He is buried in the local churchyard.

== Bibliography ==
=== The Borrible Trilogy ===
- The Borribles (1976); reissued in the United States in 2005, ISBN 0-7653-5005-X
- The Borribles Go for Broke (1981); reissued in the United States in 2005, ISBN 0-7653-5006-8
- The Borribles: Across the Dark Metropolis (1986); reissued in the United States in 2005, ISBN 0-7653-5007-6
- Reissued in the UK in one volume as The Borrible Trilogy (2002) ISBN 0-330-49085-0

=== Other works ===
- The Redwater Raid (1972)
- A Rose Beyond the Thames (1978)
- The Bunce (1980)
- Jeeno, Heloise and Igamor, the Long, Long Horse (1983)
- The Hollywood Takes (1983)
- The Provençal Tales (London: Pavilion Books, 1988; New York: St Martin's Press, 1989)
- Journal of a Sad Hermaphrodite (1992)
- Foxes' Oven (2002)
- French Leave (2002)
- Princess Diana's Revenge (2006)
- Spots of Time: A Memoir (2007)
