= Robin Skelton =

Canadian academic, writer, poet, and anthologist (1925 –1997)

- Born: 12 October 1925; Easington, Yorkshire, England
- Died: 22 August 1997 (aged 71)
- Education: University of Leeds; Cambridge University
- Occupations: Academic, writer, poet, and anthologist
- Writing career
- Pen name: Georges Zuk

Robin Skelton (12 October 1925 – 22 August 1997) was a British-Canadian academic, writer, poet, and anthologist.

== Biography ==
Born in Easington, Yorkshire, Skelton was educated at Pocklington School before enrolling at Christ's College, Cambridge, in late 1943. Called up to serve in the Royal Air Force in India, after being demobbed he chose not to return to Cambridge and instead studied English at the University of Leeds, where he graduated with a first-class BA in 1950 and MA in 1951. He subsequently taught at Manchester University, where he was a founder member of The Peterloo Group. In 1963, he emigrated to Canada, and began teaching at the University of Victoria in British Columbia.

Skelton was an authority on Irish literature. He is well known for his work as a literary editor; he was a founder and editor, with John Peter, of The Malahat Review, and a translator. Skelton was a friend of the poet W. S. Graham, and helped archive some of Graham's work. Known as a practising Wiccan, Skelton also published a number of books on the subject of the occult and other neopagan religions.

Georges Zuk, a purported French surrealist poet, was a heteronym created by Skelton.

Writers he influenced include Jordan Stratford.

== Publications ==
=== Poetry ===
- Patmos, And Other Poems (1955)
- The Poetic Pattern (1956)
- Third Day Lucky (1958)
- The Cavalier Poets (1960)
- Begging the Dialect: Poems and Ballads (1960)
- Two Ballads of the Muse (1960)
- The Dark Window (1962
- A Valedictory Poem Upon His Departure from Manchester, England, for the New World (1963)
- An Irish Gathering (1964)
- A Ballad of Billy Barker (1965)
- Because of This and Other Poems (1968)
- The Hold of Our Hands : Eight Letters to Sylvia (1968)
- Selected Poems, 1947–1967 (1968)
- An Irish Album (1969)
- Answers: Poems (1969)
- The Hunting Dark (1971)
- Private Speech: Messages, 1962–1970 (1971)
- A Different Mountain, Messages 1962 – 1970: Poems And Photo-Collages (1971)
- Remembering Synge (1971)
- Musebook (1972)
- Three For Herself (1972)
- Country Songs (1973)
- Time Light (1974)
- The Limners (1975)
- Callsigns (1976)
- Mystics Mild: Song (1976)
- Because of Love (1977)
- Three Poems (1977)
- Landmarks (1979)
- They Call It the Cariboo (1980)
- Limits (1981)
- Collected Shorter Poems, 1947–1977 (1981)
- Zuk (1982)
- The Paper Cage (1982)
- De Nihilo (1982)
- Wordsong: Twelve Ballads (1983)
- The Collected Longer Poems, 1947–1977 (1985)
- Distances (1985)
- Telling the Tale (1987)
- Openings (1988)
- Celtic Contraries (1989)
- A Formal Music: Poems in Classical Metres (1993)
- Popping Fuchsias: Poems, 1987–1992 (1992)
- A Formal Music: Poems In Classical Metres (1993)
- Islands: Poems in The Traditional Forms And Metres Of Japan (1993)
- I Am Me: Rhymes For Small (1994)
- A Way of Walking : Poems in the Traditional Forms and Metres of Japan (1994)
- Wrestling the Angel: Collected Shorter Poems, 1947–1977 (1994)
- Samhain (1994)
- The Edge Of Time: Poems And Translations (1995)
- Three for Nick (1995)
- One Leaf Shaking: Collected Later Poems, 1977–1990 (1996)
- A Further Spring: Love Poems (1996)
- Lens of Crystal: Poems (1996)
- Long, Long Ago (1996)
- Love Poems: A Further Spring (1996)
- Or So I Say: Contentions and Confessions – A Happenstance Book (1998)
- The Shapes of Our Singing (1999)
- The Shapes of Our Singing: A Guide to the Meters and Set Forms of Verse from Around the World (2002)
- In This Poem I Am(2007)

=== Fiction ===
- The Man Who Sang In His Sleep (1984)
- The Parrot Who Could (1987)
- Fires of the Kindred (1987)
- Hanky-Panky and Other Stories (1990)
- Higgledy Piggledy (1992)

=== Non-fiction ===
- John Ruskin: The Final Years (1955)
- Teach Yourself Poetry (1963)
- The Practice of Poetry (1971)
- J. M. Synge and His World (1971, US title: The Writings of J. M. Synge)
- The Poet's Calling (1975)
- Poetic Truth (1978)
- Spellcraft: A Manual of Verbal Magic (1978)
- Herbert Siebner (1979)
- They Call It The Cariboo (1980)
- Magical Practice of Talismans (1985, US title: Talismanic Magic)
- Practice of Witchcraft Today: An Introduction to Beliefs & Rituals of the Old Religion (1988)
- A Gathering of Ghosts (1989, with Jean Kozocari)
- A Witches' Book of Ghosts and Exorcism (1990, with Jean Kozocari)
- Earth Air, Fire, Water : Pre-Christian and Pagan Elements in British Songs, Rhymes and Ballads (1990, with Margaret Blackwood)
- Practice of Witchcraft Today: An Introduction To Beliefs and Rituals (1990)
- The Record of A Logophile (1990)
- A Devious Dictionary (1991)

=== Memoir ===
- The Memoirs of A Literary Blockhead (1988)
- Portrait of My Father (1989)

=== Anthologies ===
- Translations by J. M. Synge (1961)
- Edward Thomas: Selected Poems (1962)
- Collected Works of J. M. Synge (1962)
- Six Irish Poets: Austin Clarke, Richard Kell, Thomas Kinsella, John Montague, Richard Murphy, Richard Weber (1962)
- Penguin Book of Poetry of the Thirties (1963)
- Collected Poems of David Gascoyne (1965)
- The World of W B Yeats: Essays in Perspective (1965, with Anne Saddlemyer)
- Irish Renaissance: A Gathering of Essays, Memoirs and Letters from the Massachusetts Review (1965, with David R. Clark)
- Inscriptions (1967, with Herbert Siebner)
- Five Poets of the Pacific Northwest (1968)
- Poetry of the Forties (1968)
- Contemporary Poetry of British Columbia (1970)
- Collected Verse Translations of David Gascoyne (1970)
- Herbert Read: A Memorial Symposium (1970)
- Collected Plays of Jack B. Yeats (1971)
- Selected Poems Of Byron (1971)
- Introductions from an Island 1973: New Writing for Students in the Creative Writing Programme (1973)
- A Gathering in Celebration of the Eightieth Birthday of Robert Graves (1975, edited with William Thomas)
- Six Poets of British Columbia (1980)
- From Syria by Ezra Pound (1981)
- Herbert Siebner: A Celebration (1993)
- Dark Seasons A Selection of Georg Trakl Poems (1994)

=== Translations ===
- Georges Zuk: Selected Verse (1969)
- 200 Poems from the Greek Anthology (1971)
- The Underwear of the Unicorn by Georges Zuk (1975)
- George Faludy: Selected Poems, 1933–80 (1985)
- Briefly Singing : A Gathering of Erotic Satirical and Other Inscriptions Epigrams and Lyrics from the Greek and Roman Mediterranean 800 BC – AD 1000 Including the Complete Poems of Rufinus (1994)
- Rufinus. The Complete Poems (1997)
