= Curtis Brown (agency) =

Literary and talent agency

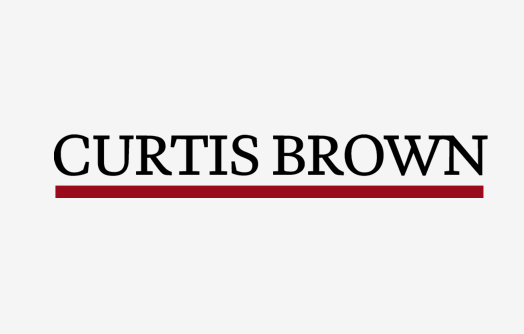
- Parent company: United Talent Agency
- Founded: 1899; 127 years ago
- Headquarters location: London, UK
- Key people: Jonny Geller (CEO); Sarah Spear (Director); Nick Marston (Director); Simon Flamank (CFO); Raneet Ahuja (COO)
- Official website: curtisbrown.co.uk

Curtis Brown is a literary and talent agency based in London, UK. One of the oldest literary agencies in Europe, it was founded by Albert Curtis Brown in 1899. It is part of The Curtis Brown Group of companies.

== History ==
Albert Curtis Brown was an American journalist who was the London correspondent for The New York Press. He also ran a press syndication agency. He started representing authors seeking publishing opportunities in Europe and the Americas.

The first deal he transacted was selling serial rights in John Oliver Hobbes’s The Vineyard. The literary agency element of Brown’s business was accommodated alongside his press agency in Henrietta Street, Covent Garden. In 1914, Curtis Brown opened its first international office in New York; subsequently, offices were opened in Paris, Berlin, Milan and Copenhagen.

During this period, Brown carried out agency business on behalf of a large number of well-known writers such as Kenneth Grahame, A. A. Milne and D. H. Lawrence. It also worked on behalf of prominent figures of the day including Winston Churchill, David Lloyd George and U.S. President Woodrow Wilson.

Curtis Brown wrote an autobiography called Contacts – published by Cassell in 1935. He ran the agency until 1935 when he was succeeded by his son Spencer Curtis Brown. Spencer ran the agency until his retirement in 1968 when he sold it to an investment company.

=== After Brown family ownership ===
The agency was instrumental in establishing the reputations of several British and American writers, including John Steinbeck, William Faulkner, Norman Mailer, C. P. Snow, Angus Wilson, Lawrence Durrell, Gerald Durrell, Gerald Butler, Kingsley Amis, Elizabeth Bowen and Isaiah Berlin.

In 1953 Spencer Curtis Brown Black head hunted Kitty Black and she became chief play reader at Curtis Brown. She played golf and used her connections to find clients that included Somerset Maugham and Samuel Beckett. She was involved with the noted production of Samuel Beckett's Waiting for Godot in 1956. She notably told John Osborne to "think again" about his play Look Back in Anger (1956) that would later transform British theatre.

=== Management buyouts ===
The agency was bought back by its management team in 1982.

In 1995, Jonathan Lloyd was recruited from the publishers HarperCollins to become managing director and two years later Nick Marston joined from rival agents AP Watt to begin the new film, theatre and television department.

A further buy-out in 2001-2002 resulted in the present ownership of the agency by its management.

In 2008, Curtis Brown and ICM (International Creative Management) signed a deal for Curtis Brown to represent ICM’s clients in the UK and across the world.

In addition to its books, actors, presenters, theatre and television departments, the company has a film production arm launched in 2008, Cuba Pictures.

In May 2012, the company restructured its management team with Jonathan Lloyd becoming Chairman and with Ben Hall and Jonny Geller becoming joint Chief Executives.

In March 2013, Curtis Brown acquired a major stake in leading literary agency Conville & Walsh, finally acquiring the company in early 2015, changing its name to C&W Agency, as a division of the Curtis Brown Group.

=== Acquisition ===
In June 2022, United Talent Agency (UTA) acquired The Curtis Brown Group.

In April 2025, Cuba Pictures was sold to Vice Media.

== Former personnel ==
- Naomi Burton Stone, literary agent, 1939–1965
- Graham Watson, literary agent, 1947–1980
- Kitty Black, literary agent, 1953–?
- Giles Gordon, literary agent, 1994–2003

== The Curtis Brown Prize ==
The Curtis Brown Prize was established in 2006 in memory of agent Giles Gordon (1940-2003). Worth £1,500, it is awarded annually for the best writer of prose fiction on the University of East Anglia MA in Creative Writing (Prose Fiction) course, based on the material submitted by students for their MA assessment. The winner is chosen by a panel of Curtis Brown agents from a shortlist comprising all students in the year who achieve an MA with distinction. The inaugural award was made to Joe Dunthorne in 2006 for his novel Submarine. Other recipients are: Tamara Britten (2007), Daniel Timms (2008), Lauren Owen (2009), Gillian Daly (2010), Chelsey Flood (2011), Charlotte Stretch (2012).
