= 1954 in Australian literature =

This article presents a list of the historical events and publications of Australian literature during 1954.

== Events ==
- Charlotte Jay (pseudonym of Geraldine Halls) won the inaugural Edgar Allan Poe Award for Best Novel for Beat Not the Bones

== Novels ==
- James Aldridge – Heroes of the Empty View
- Jon Cleary – The Climate of Courage
- Miles Franklin – Cockatoos : A Story of Youth and Exodists
- Catherine Gaskin – Sara Dane
- T. A. G. Hungerford – Sowers of the Wind : A Novel of the Occupation of Japan
- Eric Lambert
  - The Five Bright Stars
  - The Veterans
- Eve Langley – White Topee
- Kenneth Mackenzie – The Refuge
- Alan Moorehead – A Summer Night
- E. V. Timms – The Fury
- Judah Waten – The Unbending

== Crime and mystery ==
- Arthur Upfield
  - Death of a Lake
  - Sinister Stones

== Short stories ==
- A. Bertram Chandler – "Shadow Before"
- David Martin – "Where a Man Belongs"
- John Morrison – "The Incense-Burner"
- Dal Stivens – "In the Depths"
- Judah Waten – "Well, What do You Say to My Boy?"

== Children's and Young Adult fiction ==
- Nan Chauncy – A Fortune for the Brave
- Joan Phipson – Six and Silver
- Norman B. Tindale & Harold Arthur Lindsay – The First Walkabout, illustrated by Madeleine Boyce

== Poetry ==
- Thea Astley – "Droving Man"
- Dorothy Auchterlonie – "The Tree"
- John Blight
  - "Death of a Whale"
  - "Rope"
  - The Two Suns Met : Poems
- R. D. Fitzgerald
  - "Beginnings"
  - "Edge"
- Mary Gilmore – Fourteen Men : Verses
- A. D. Hope – "The Return of Persephone"
- Christopher Koch – "The Boy Who Dreamed the Country Night"
- James McAuley
  - "New Guinea"
  - "To the Holy Spirit"
- Kenneth Mackenzie – "An Old Inmate"
- David Rowbotham – "Mullabinda"
- Douglas Stewart – "Spider-Gums"
- Colin Thiele – "The Mushroomer"
- John Thompson – Thirty Poems
- Judith Wright
  - "At Cooloolah"
  - "Flying Fox on Barbed Wire"
  - "The Two Fires"

== Drama ==
=== Theatre ===
- James Workman – Eternal Night

== Biography ==
- Nevil Shute – Slide Rule : The Autobiography of an Engineer
- David Unaipon – My Life Story

== Non-Fiction ==
- Frank Clune – The Kelly Hunters
- Frank Clune and P. R. Stephensen – The Viking of Van Diemen's Land
- Vance Palmer – The Legend of the Nineties

== Awards and honours ==
=== Literary ===
Award	Author	Title	Publisher
ALS Gold Medal	Mary Gilmore	Fourteen Men : Verses	Angus and Robertson

=== Children's and Young Adult ===
Award	Category	Author	Title	Publisher
Children's Book of the Year Award	Older Readers	K. Langloh Parker, edited by Henrietta Drake-Brockman, illustrated by Elizabeth Durack	Australian Legendary Tales	Angus and Robertson

=== Poetry ===
Award	Author	Title	Publisher
Grace Leven Prize for Poetry	John Thompson	Thirty Poems	Edwards and Shaw

== Births ==
A list, ordered by date of birth (and, if the date is either unspecified or repeated, ordered alphabetically by surname) of births in 1954 of Australian literary figures, authors of written works or literature-related individuals follows, including year of death.

- 12 January
  - Brian Caswell, writer for children
  - Lee Tulloch, novelist
- 26 March – Dorothy Porter, poet (died 2008)
- 21 May – Paul Collins, author and editor
- 17 June – Kerry Greenwood, novelist (died 2025)
- 5 July – Kevin Hart, poet
- 20 September – James Moloney, writer for children
- 1 November – Andrew Lansdown, poet
- 16 November – Anne Morgan, writer of children's books

Unknown date

- Russell Blackford, novelist and critic
- Rory Harris, poet
- Shane McCauley, poet
- Rosemary Sorensen, journalist, editor and critic

== Deaths ==
A list, ordered by date of death (and, if the date is either unspecified or repeated, ordered alphabetically by surname) of deaths in 1954 of Australian literary figures, authors of written works or literature-related individuals follows, including year of birth.

- 16 May — Jack McLaren, novelist (born 1884)
- 28 June — Nancy Francis, poet, journalist and short story writer (born 1873)
- 19 September – Miles Franklin, novelist (born 1879)
- 2 November – Malcolm Afford, playwright and novelist (born 1906)

== See also ==
- 1954 in Australia
- 1954 in literature
- 1954 in poetry
- List of years in Australian literature
- List of years in literature
