= 1955 in Australian literature =

This article presents a list of the historical events and publications of Australian literature during 1955.

== Books ==
- Martin Boyd – A Difficult Young Man
- Jon Cleary – Justin Bayard
- Charmian Clift & George Johnston – The Sponge Divers
- Dymphna Cusack – The Sun in Exile
- Mary Durack – Keep Him My Country
- Barbara Jefferis – Beloved Lady
- D'Arcy Niland – The Shiralee
- Ruth Park – Pink Flannel
- Colin Roderick – The Lady and the Lawyer
- Nevil Shute – Requiem for a Wren, (aka The Breaking Wave)
- E. V. Timms – They Came from the Sea
- Arthur Upfield – The Battling Prophet
- F. B. Vickers – The Mirage
- Patrick White – The Tree of Man

== Short stories ==
- A. Bertram Chandler – "Late"
- John Morrison – Black Cargo and Other Stories
- Vance Palmer – Let the Birds Fly
- Dal Stivens – Ironbark Bill

== Children's and Young Adult fiction ==
- Patricia Wrightson – The Crooked Snake, illustrated by Margaret Horder

== Poetry ==
- Lex Banning – "Apocalypse in Springtime"
- David Campbell – "Here, Under Pear-Trees"
- Rosemary Dobson – Child with a Cockatoo, and Other Poems
- Max Harris – The Coorong and Other Poems
- A. D. Hope
  - "The Death of the Bird"
  - The Wandering Islands
- Nancy Keesing & Douglas Stewart – Australian Bush Ballads (edited)
- Nancy Keesing – Three Men and Sydney
- James McAuley – Australian Poetry 1955 (edited)
- Roland Robinson
  - "Altjeringa"
  - "Passage of the Swans"
- Vivian Smith – "Portuguese Laurel Flowering"
- Douglas Stewart – The Birdsville Track and Other Poems
- Randolph Stow – "Sea Children"
- Judith Wright – The Two Fires

== Drama ==
=== Theatre ===
- Dymphna Cusack – The Golden Girls : A Play in Three Acts
- Ray Lawler – Summer of the Seventeenth Doll
- Morris West – The Illusionists

== Biography ==
- Frank Clune – Martin Cash
- Leonie Kramer – Henry Kingsley : Some Novels of Australian Life
- Alan Marshall – I Can Jump Puddles

== Non-fiction ==
- Frank Clune – Overland Telegraph

== Awards and honours ==
=== Literary ===
| Award | Author | Title | Publisher |
|---|---|---|---|
| ALS Gold Medal | Patrick White | The Tree of Man | Viking Press |

=== Children's and Young Adult ===
| Award | Category | Author | Title | Publisher |
|---|---|---|---|---|
| Children's Book of the Year Award | Older Readers | Norman B. Tindale & Harold Arthur Lindsay, illustrated by Madeleine Boyce | The First Walkabout | Longmans Green |

=== Poetry ===
| Award | Author | Title | Publisher |
|---|---|---|---|
| Grace Leven Prize for Poetry | A. D. Hope | The Wandering Islands | Edwards and Shaw |

== Births ==
A list, ordered by date of birth (and, if the date is either unspecified or repeated, ordered alphabetically by surname) of births in 1955 of Australian literary figures, authors of written works or literature-related individuals follows, including year of death.

- 27 March – Linda Jaivin, novelist
- 28 March – Tony Shillitoe, novelist
- 8 June – Peter Rose, poet and editor
- 15 June – Les Wicks, poet and editor
- 5 August – Christine Harris, writer for children
- 14 September – Geraldine Brooks, novelist

Unknown date

- Candida Baker, novelist and anthologist
- Michael Gerard Bauer, children's and young adult author
- Adrian Caesar, poet
- Martin Flanagan, journalist
- Michael Gow, playwright
- Jennifer Harrison, poet
- Gail Jones, novelist
- Steven Paulsen, sf writer
- Cory Taylor, writer (died 2016)

== Deaths ==
A list, ordered by date of death (and, if the date is either unspecified or repeated, ordered alphabetically by surname) of deaths in 1955 of Australian literary figures, authors of written works or literature-related individuals follows, including year of birth.

- 19 January – Kenneth Mackenzie, poet and novelist (born 1913)
- 10 March – Brian Vrepont, poet (born 1882)
- 1 August – Charles Shaw, journalist and novelist (born 1900)
- 30 December – Rex Ingamells, poet (born 1913)

== See also ==
- 1955 in Australia
- 1955 in literature
- 1955 in poetry
- List of years in Australian literature
- List of years in literature
