= 1955 in poetry =

Nationality words link to articles with information on the nation's poetry or literature (for instance, Irish or France).

== Events ==
- April – Wallace Stevens is baptized a Catholic by the chaplain of St. Francis Hospital in Hartford, Connecticut, where Stevens spends his last days suffering from terminal cancer. After a brief release from the hospital, Stevens is readmitted and dies on August 2 at the age of 76.
- July 30 – Philip Larkin makes a train journey in England from Hull to Grantham which inspires his poem The Whitsun Weddings. His collection The Less Deceived is published in November (dated October).
- The Group, a British poetry movement, starts meeting in London with gatherings taking place once a week, on Friday evenings, at first at Philip Hobsbaum's flat and later at the house of Edward Lucie-Smith. The poets gather to discuss each other's work, putting into practice the sort of analysis and objective comment in keeping with the principles of Hobsbaum's Cambridge tutor F. R. Leavis and of the New Criticism in general. Before each meeting about six or seven poems by one poet are typed, duplicated and distributed to the dozen or so participants.
- The Movement poets as a group in Britain come to public notice this year in Robert Conquest's anthology New Lines. The core of the group consists of Philip Larkin, Elizabeth Jennings, D. J. Enright, Kingsley Amis, Thom Gunn and Donald Davie. They are identified with a hostility to modernism and internationalism, and look to Thomas Hardy as a model. However, both Davie and Gunn later move away from this position.
- Henry Rago becomes editor of Poetry magazine in the United States.

=== Beat poets ===
- July 19 – Beat poet Weldon Kees's Plymouth Savoy is found on the north side of the Golden Gate Bridge in San Francisco with the keys in the ignition. When his friends go to search his apartment, all they find are the cat he had named Lonesome and a pair of red socks in the sink. His sleeping bag and savings account book are missing. He has left no note. No one is sure if Kees, 41, jumped off the bridge that day or if he went to Mexico. Before his disappearance, Kees quoted Rilke to friend Michael Grieg, ominously saying that sometimes a person needs to change his life completely.
- October 7 – The "Six Gallery reading" takes place in San Francisco with Kenneth Rexroth acting as M.C., Philip Lamantia, Michael McClure, Gary Snyder, and Philip Whalen read, and the event includes Allen Ginsberg's first reading of "Howl" (written the previous summer at Ginsberg's cottage in Berkeley, California); the reading (1) brings together the East and West Coast factions of the Beat Generation, (2) is the first important public manifestation of the poetry movement and (3) helps to herald the West Coast literary revolution that becomes known as the San Francisco Renaissance. In the audience a totally drunken Jack Kerouac refuses to read his own work but cheers on the others, shouting "Yeah! Go! Go!" during their performances.

== Works published in English ==
Listed by nation where the work was first published and again by the poet's native land, if different; substantially revised works listed separately:

=== Australia ===
- A. D. Hope:
  - "The Death of the Bird"
  - The Wandering Islands
- Nancy Keesing & Douglas Stewart, Australian Bush Ballads (edited)
- Judith Wright, The Two Fires

=== Canada ===
- Eldon Grier, A Morning from Scraps
- Irving Layton, The Blue Propeller. Toronto: Contact Press.
- Irving Layton, The Cold Green Element. Toronto: Contact Press.
- Dorothy Livesay, New Poems. Toronto: Emblem Books.
- Sir Charles G.D. Roberts, Selected Poems, edited by Desmond Pacey, posthumously published
- Raymond Souster, For What Time Slays. Toronto: Contact Press.
- Miriam Waddington, The Second Silence
- Wilfred Watson, Friday's Child
- Anne Wilkinson, The Hangman Ties the Holly

=== New Zealand ===
- James K. Baxter:
  - The Fire and the Anvil, critical study, based on three Macmillan Brown lectures on poetry at Victoria University in 1954, criticism
  - Traveller's Litany, a long poem published in pamphlet form
- J. R. Hervey, She Was My Spring
- Kendrick Smithyman, The Gay Trapeze, Wellington: Handcraft Press

=== United Kingdom ===
- W. H. Auden, The Shield of Achilles, first published in the United States
- Austin Clarke, Ancient Lights
- Robert Conquest, Poems
- Patric Dickinson, The Scale of Things
- W. S. Graham, The Nightfishing
- Robert Graves, Collected Poems 1955, revisions and reprintings of previously published poems; among eight books of poetry included in "A List of 250 Outstanding Books of the Year" in The New York Times Book Review
- Elizabeth Jennings, A Way of Looking
- Philip Larkin, The Less Deceived, Hessle, East Yorkshire: Marvell Press
- Norman MacCaig, Riding Lights
- Hugh MacDiarmid, pen name of Christopher Murray Grieve, In Memoriam James Joyce
- Edith Anne Robertson, Poems Frae the Suddron
- Iain Crichton Smith, The Long River
- Stephen Spender, Collected Poems, 1928–1953, what he considers his best poems, selected and revised; among eight books of poetry included in "A List of 250 Outstanding Books of the Year" in The New York Times Book Review
- R. S. Thomas, Song at the Year's Turning, introduction by John Betjeman
- Charles Tomlinson, The Necklace

=== United States ===
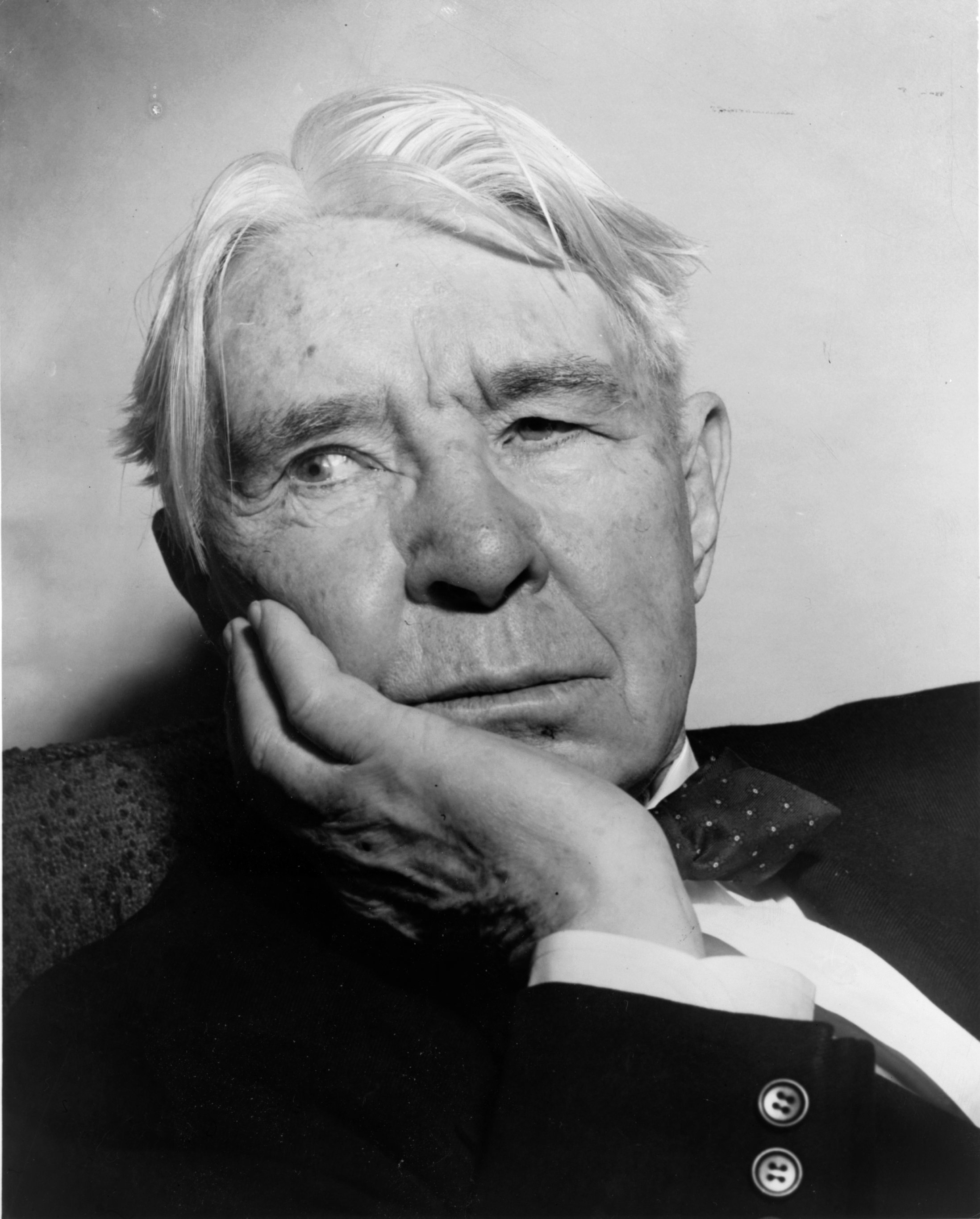
Carl Sandburg in 1955

- A.R. Ammons, Ommateum with Doxology, his first book
- W. H. Auden, The Shield of Achilles, a book of 28 pastoral and devotional poems (his poem of the same name was first published in 1953); among eight books of poetry included in "A List of 250 Outstanding Books of the Year" in The New York Times Book Review
- Elizabeth Bishop, Poems: North & South — A Cold Spring, (Houghton Mifflin); among eight books of poetry included in "A List of 250 Outstanding Books of the Year" in The New York Times Book Review
- Paul Blackburn, The Dissolving Fabric, Highlands, North Carolina: The Divers Press
- Kenneth Burke, Book of Monuments: Poems 1915–1954
- John Ciardi, As If
- Robert P. Tristram Coffin, Selected Poems, among eight books of poetry included in "A List of 250 Outstanding Books of the Year" in The New York Times Book Review
- Gregory Corso, The Vestal Lady on Brattle and Other Poems
- Louis Coxe, The Second Man
- Robert Creeley, All That is Lovely in Man
- Emily Dickinson (died 1886), The Poems of Emily Dickinson, three volumes, edited by Thomas H. Johnson, the first complete scholarly "definitive edition of the Dickinson poems with variant readings critically compared," according to the New York Times Book Review, which lists it among eight books of poetry included in "A List of 250 Outstanding Books of the Year"
- Lawrence Ferlinghetti, Pictures of the Gone World
- Isabella Gardner, Birthdays from the Ocean, her first collection; among eight books of poetry included in "A List of 250 Outstanding Books of the Year" in The New York Times Book Review
- William Graham (poet), The Nightfishing
- Donald Hall, Exiles and Marriages
- Robert Hughes, Collected Poems
- Randall Jarrell, Selected Poems
- Josephine Miles, Prefabrications
- Howard Nemerov, The Salt Garden
- John Crowe Ransom, Poems and Essays
- Adrienne Rich, The Diamond Cutters and Other Poems
- Louis Simpson, Good News of Death
- William Carlos Williams, Journey to Love

==== Criticism, scholarship, and biography in the United States ====
- Carl Sandburg, Prairie-town boy (autobiography; essentially excerpts from Always the Young Strangers)

== Works published in other languages ==
=== France ===
- Guillaume Apollinaire, pen name of Wilhelm Apollinaris de Kostrowitzky (died 1918), Poèmes à Lou, (a revised edition of Ombre de mon amour, published by P. Cailler Vesenaz 1947)
- Pierre Oster, Le Champ de mai
- Jacques Prévert, La Pluie et le beau temps
- Roger-Arnould Rivière, L'Équerre
- Victor Segalen (died 1919), Stèles, Peintures, Équipée (see also Stèles 1912)
- Jean Tortel, Naissance de l'objet
- Tristan Tzara, pen name of Sami Rosenstock, Le temps naissant
- Tchicaya U Tam'si, Mauvais sang

=== India ===
Listed in alphabetical order by first name:

==== Gujarati ====
- Balumukund Dave, Parikrama, Gujarati
- Natvarlal Kuberdas Pandya, Prasun, the author's first collection of poems
- Ramnarayan Vishvanath Pathak, Brhat Pingal, a study of the history and structure of Gujarati prosody
- Venibhai Purohit, Sinjarav, the author's first collection of poems

==== Oriya ====
- Krushnachandra Tripathy, Ahuti
- Mohan Upendra Thakur, Phuldali
- Narendranath Misra, Balarama Dasa O Oriya Ramayana, critical study of Balaram Das, the 15th-century poet-saint and author of the most popular Ramayana in the Oriya language

==== Other languages of the Indian subcontinent ====
- Amrita Pritam, Sunehure, Punjabi
- Birendra Chattopadhyay, Ulukhagdar Kabita, Bengali
- C. Narayanan Nair, translator, Kannaki-Kovalam, translation into Sanskrit from the Silappadikaram, a Tamil-language poem
- Dina Nath Walli, also known as "Almast", Bala Yepari, lyrics on rural themes, mostly in the vatsun form; Kashmiri
- Hitanarayan Jha, Kavivar Canda Jha O Wordsworthak prakrtiprem, a comparative study of Chanda Jha and William Wordsworth's love of nature; Maithili
- Jaswant Singh Neki, Asle Te Ohle, Punjabi
- Kalachand Shastri Chingorgban, Manipuri Mahabharat, translation into Meitei from the Sanskrit Mahabharat, in 20 volumes, published from this year to 1980
- Krishnakanta Mishra, Maithili Sahityak Itihas, history of Maithili literature
- Lekhraj Aziz, Gul Va Khar, study of prosody and the rules of Islamic meters, including examples from various works by modern Sindhi poets
- Ram Nath Shastri, translator, Niti Sataka, translation into Dogri from the Sanskrit poems of Bhartrihari
- Sri Naunram Samskarta, Dasa dev, Rajasthani
- Sudhindranath Datta, translator, Pratidhvani, translation into Bengali from English, French and German poems, including verses by Shakespeare, Mallarme and Heine
- V. R. M. Chettiyar, Kavinan Kural, literary essays on Percy Bysshe Shelley, Ralph Waldo Emerson, William Shakespeare, William Wordsworth, Bharatidasan, Mutiyaracan among others; Tamil

=== Other languages ===
- Simin Behbahani, Chelcheragh ("Chandelier"), Persia
- Alberto de Lacerda, 77 Poems, Portuguese poet published in English, translations by poet and Arthur Waley
- Delia Domínguez, Simbólico retorno, Chile
- H. E. Holthusen and F. Kemp, editors, Ergriffenes Dasein: deutsche Lyrik 1900-1950, anthology, Germany
- Alaíde Foppa, La sin ventura ("The Unfortunate"), Guatemala
- Henryk Jasiczek, Obuszkiem ciosane, Poland
- Alexander Mezhirov, Возвращение ("Return"), Soviet Union
- Giorgos Seferis, Ημερολόγιο Καταστρώματος ΙΙΙ ("Deck Diary III"), Greece
- Yoshioka Minoru, 静物 ("Still Life"), Japan

== Awards and honors ==
- Frost Medal: Leona Speyer
- National Book Award for Poetry: Wallace Stevens, The Collected Poems
- Pulitzer Prize for Poetry: Wallace Stevens: Collected Poems
- Queen's Gold Medal for Poetry: Ruth Pitter
- Bollingen Prize: Léonie Adams and Louise Bogan
- Fellowship of the Academy of American Poets: Rolfe Humphries
- Australia: Grace Leven Prize for Poetry: A. D. Hope, The Wandering Islands
- Canada: Governor General's Award, poetry or drama: Friday's Child, Wilfred Watson
- Vachel Lindsay Prize (Poetry (magazine)): Violet Ranney Lang

== Births ==
Death years link to the corresponding "[year] in poetry" article:

- January 1 – Mir Tanha Yousafi (died 2019), Pakistani Punjabi and Urdu writer
- January 16 – Mary Karr, American poet and memoirist
- February 2 – Leszek Engelking, Polish poet
- February 22 – Yang Lian 杨炼, Swiss-born Chinese poet associated with the Misty Poets
- March 19 – John Burnside, Scottish poet and fiction writer
- March 27 – Lisa Zeidner, American poet
- April 4 – Margaret Lindsay Holton, Canadian designer and writer
- April 17 – Erín Moure, Canadian poet
- April 22 – Marie Uguay (died 1981), French-Canadian poet
- May 13 – Mark Abley, Canadian poet, journalist, editor and non-fiction writer
- July 5
  - Sebastian Barry, Irish novelist, playwright and poet
  - Mia Couto (António Emílio Leite Couto), Mozambican Portuguese-language fiction writer and poet
- July 6 – William Wall, Irish novelist, poet and short story writer
- July 12 – Robin Robertson, Scottish-born poet, novelist and editor
- June 15 – Les Wicks, Australian poet
- June 25 – Patricia Smith, African-American poet, "spoken-word performer", playwright, author and writing teacher
- September 13 – Hiromi Itō, Japanese poet
- October 19 – Jason Shinder (died 2008), American poet, editor, anthologist and teacher, founder of Y.M.C.A. National Writer's Voice program, one of the country's largest networks of literary-arts centers, at one time an assistant to Allen Ginsberg
- October 26 – Michelle Boisseau (died 2017), American poet
- December 5 – Dumitru Găleșanu, Romanian poet, writer, illustrator and jurist
- December 23 – Carol Ann Duffy, Scottish poet
- Also:
  - Marilyn Chin, American poet
  - Chris Edwards, Australian poet
  - Paula Green, New Zealand poet
  - Jennifer Harrison, Australian psychiatrist, poet and photographer
  - Paula Meehan, Irish poet
  - Kim Morrissey, Canadian poet and playwright
  - Wang Xiaoni, Chinese poet
  - Dean Young, American poet
  - Ouyang Yu, Australian poet, novelist, writer, translator and academic

== Deaths ==
Birth years link to the corresponding "[year] in poetry" article:

- January 1 – Mizuho Ōta 太田水穂, pen-name of Teiichi Ōta 太田 貞, occasionally also using alternative pen name "Mizuhonoya", 78 (born 1876), Shōwa period Japanese poet and literary scholar (surname: Ōta)
- January 19 – Kenneth Mackenzie, writing fiction as Seaforth Mackenzie, 41 (born 1913), Australian poet and novelist (accidental drowning)
- January 20 – Robert P. Tristram Coffin, 62 (born 1892), American poet, essayist and novelist
- March 10 – Brian Vrepont (born 1882), Australian poet
- June 19 – Adrienne Monnier, 63 (born 1892), French poet and publisher
- July 18 – Weldon Kees, 41 (born 1914), American poet, critic, novelist, short story writer, painter and composer (presumed dead – see "Events" section)
- August 2 – Wallace Stevens, 75 (born 1879), American poet
- November 12 – Tin Ujević, 64 (born 1891), Croatian poet
- December 30 – Rex Ingamells, 42 (born 1913), Australian poet influential in the Jindyworobak Movement (automobile accident)

== See also ==
- Poetry
- List of poetry awards
- List of years in poetry
