= 1954 in poetry =

Nationality words link to articles with information on the nation's poetry or literature (for instance, Irish or France).

== Events ==
- January 25 – Dylan Thomas's Under Milk Wood is broadcast posthumously on BBC Radio.
- February – W. H. Auden and Chester Kallman move to an apartment on the Lower East Side of Manhattan.
- Spring – Robert Creeley founds and edits the Black Mountain Review.
- Publication of American literary theorist William K. Wimsatt's collected essays Verbal Icon: Studies in the Meaning of Poetry, including the influential critical essays “The Intentional Fallacy” and “The Affective Fallacy” cowritten with Monroe Beardsley.
- Jack Kerouac reads Dwight Goddard's A Buddhist Bible, which will influence him greatly.

== Works published in English ==
Listed by nation where the work was first published and again by the poet's native land, if different; substantially revised works listed separately:

=== Australia ===
- John Blight, "Death of a Whale"
- Mary Gilmore, Fourteen Men : Verses
- John Thompson, Thirty Poems
- Judith Wright:
  - "At Cooloolah"
  - "The Two Fires"

=== Canada ===
- Daryl Hine, Five Poems
- Irving Layton, In the Midst of My Fever. Palma de Mallorca, Spain: Divers Press.
- Irving Layton, The Long Pea-Shooter. Montreal: Laocoon Press.
- Jay Macpherson, O Earth Return
- P. K. Page, The Metal and the Flower, Toronto: McClelland & Stewart, Canada
- Raymond Souster, A Dream That Is Dying. Toronto: Contact Press
- Raymond Souster, Walking Death. Toronto: Contact Press.
- F. R. Scott, Events and Signals. Toronto: Ryerson Press.
- A. J. M. Smith, A Sort of Ecstasy; Michigan State College Press / Ryerson Press.

=== India, in English ===
- Sri Aurobindo:
  - Collected Poems (Poetry in English), Pondicherry: Sri Aurobindo Ashram
  - Savitri ( Poetry in English ), Pondicherry: Sri Aurobindo Ashram
- R. de L. Furtado, The Centre, Hamilton, Ontario: Cromlech Press; Indian author published in Canada
- Nizamat Jung, Poems (Poetry in English), edited and published by Zahir Ahmed in Hyderabad
- Prithwi Singh Nahar, The Wind of Silence (Poetry in English), songs, sonnets and other poems; Pondicherry: Sri Aurobindo Ashram
- C. Raju, This Modern Age, foreword by Amarnath Jha
- K. S. R. Sastry, A Vision of India, Madras: Raja Power Press

=== United Kingdom ===
- W. H. Auden, The Shield of Achilles, English poet living in the United States at this time
- Sir John Betjeman, A Few Late Chrysanthemums
- George Mackay Brown, The Storm, Scotland
- Thom Gunn, Fighting Terms, Fantasy Press
- John Heath-Stubbs, A Charm Against the Toothace
- Philip Larkin, The Less Deceived
- David Raikes (posthumous), The Poems of David Raikes

==== Criticism, scholarship and biography in the United Kingdom ====
- P. Cruttwell, The Shakespearean Moment, criticism, United Kingdom
- G. Hartmann, The Unmediated Vision, criticism, United Kingdom
- W. K. Wimsatt Jr., The Verbal Icon, criticism, United Kingdom
- Jon Silkin, The Peaceable Kingdom, including "Death of a Son (who died in a mental hospital aged one)"
- Dylan Thomas, Quite Early One Morning, New Directions Publishers

=== United States ===
- Léonie Adams, Poems
- W. H. Auden, The Shield of Achilles, English poet living in the United States at this time
- Louise Bogan, Collected Poems, 1923–1953
- E. E. Cummings, Poems, 1923–1954
- Babette Deutsch, Animal, Vegetable, Mineral
- Anthony Hecht, A Summoning of Stones
- Daniel G. Hoffman, An Armada of Thirty Wales
- Robinson Jeffers, Hungerfield and Other Poems
- Weldon Kees, Poems 1947–1954
- Archibald MacLeish, Songs for Eve
- W. S. Merwin, The Dancing Bears, New Haven, Connecticut: Yale University Press (reprinted as part of The First Four Books of Poems, 1975)
- Edna St. Vincent Millay, Mine the Harvest
- Marianne Moore, The Fables of La Fontaine
- Howard Moss, The Toy Fair
- Kenneth Patchen, The Famous Boating Party
- May Swenson, Another Animal
- Wallace Stevens, The Collected Poems of Wallace Stevens, includes "The Rock," previously unpublished section including "The Poem That Took the Place of a Mountain," "A Quiet Normal Life," "Final Soliloquy of the Interior Paramour," "The Rock," "The Planet on the Table," and "Not Ideas about the Thing but the Thing Itself"), Knopf
- E. B. White, The Second Tree from the Corner
- William Carlos Williams, The Desert Music and Other Poems

==== Criticism, scholarship and biography in the United States ====
- Hugh Kenner, Wyndham Lewis: A Critical Guidebook, criticism, United States
- W. C. Williams, Selected Essays, criticism, United States

=== Other ===
- Martin Carter, Poems of Resistance, Guyana
- Wilson Harris, Eternity to Season, Guyana
- Frank Prince, Soldiers Bathing and Other Poems, South African
- Keith Sinclair, Strangers or Beasts: Poems, New Zealand

== Works published in other languages ==
=== French language ===
==== Canada, in French ====
- Jean-Guy Pilon, Les cloîtres de l'été, Montréal: l'Hexagone

==== France ====
- Louis Aragon, Les Yeux et la memoire
- Jean Cocteau, Clair–obscur
- René Daumal, Poésie noire, poésie blanche, posthumously published (died 1944)
- Jean Follain, Appareil de la terre
- Jean Grosjean, Fils de l'homme
- Henri Michaux, Face au verrous

=== India ===
In each section, listed in alphabetical order by first name:

==== Hindi ====
- Girija Kumar Mathur, Dhup ke dhan
- Namvar Singh, Chayavad, literary criticism that offers a radically new interpretation of the romantic movement in Hindi poetry; shows the social foundations of Hindi romanticism and its ties to the progressive movement that followed it
- Premchand, Sahitya Ka Uddesya, literary essays; published posthumously

==== Malayalam ====
- P. K. Paramesvaran Nair, Adhunika Sahitya Caritram, history of Malayalam literature (later translated into English and published by Sahitya Akademi in 1967 under the title History of Malayalam Literature)
- P. Kunjiraman Nair, Kaliyacchan, poems reflecting traditional ways of life in Kerala
- Sreedhara Menon, Kunnimenikal
- Sukumar Azhikode, Asante Sitakavyam, critical assessment of Kumaran Asan's Cintavishtayaya

==== Urdu ====
- Gian Chand Jain, Urdu ki nasri dastanen, literary criticism on classical Urdu fiction ("dastan"), written in that language
- Jigar Brelvi, Payam-i Savitri, a narrative poem on Savitri, a figure from Hindu mythology; Urdu
- Masood Husain Khan, Urdu zaban aur adab, critical study on the Urdu language and literature

==== Other languages of the Indian subcontinent ====
- Baldev Gajra, also known as "Gumnam", Gumnam Sada, nationalist poems; Sindhi
- Buddhadeb Basu, Sahitya Carca, essays on various literary topics; Bengali
- Jayant Pathak, Marmar, the author's first poetry collection; Gujarati
- M. Gopalakrishna Adiga, Cendemaddale, Kannada
- Mohan Singh, Awazan, lyrics with a "romantic progressive ideology", according to Indian academic Sisir Kumar Das; Punjabi
- Nand Lal Ambardar, Loel Ta Husun, including "Roopavat", Kashmiri
- Nirendranath Chakraborty (also transliterated into English as Nirendranath Chakravarti, ), Nilnirjan (also transliterated into English as Nirendranath Chakravarti), mostly love poems, although one or two have political elements, Kolkata: Signet Press; Bengali-language
- Raghunath Singh Samyal, Dogra Desa Te Dogari Boli, Dogri poetry praising Dograland, Dogra people and the Dogri language
- Tulasibahadur Chetri, nicknamed "Apatan", Samkalpa ("Resolve"), Nepali
- Madhunapantula Satyanarayanashastri, also spelled "Madhunapantula Satyanarayana Sastri", Andhra Puranamu, Telugu, (surname: Madhunapantula)
- Manoj Das, Padadvani, Oriya
- Satramdas, also known as "Sail", Rama Katha, 32 cantos in a Persian meter, written in the wake of the partition of India in 1947; Sindhi
- Visvanatha Satyanarayana, Nannayagari prasanna Katha Kalitartha Yukti, critical appraisal of Nannaya; Telugu

=== Other languages ===
- Simin Behbahani, Ja-ye Pa ("Footprint"), Persia
- José Santos Chocano, Obras completas, pról. de Luis Alberto Sánchez Madrid, Aguilar, Peruvian poetry published in Spain
- Haim Gouri, Shirei Hotam ("Poems of the Seal"), Israeli writing in Hebrew
- Sorley MacLean, Hallaig, Scottish Gaelic (in Gairm 8)
- Pier Paolo Pasolini, La meglio gioventù, Friulian language published in Italy
- Maria Luisa Spaziani, Le acque del sabato, Italy
- Wisława Szymborska, Pytania zadawane sobie ("Questioning Yourself"), Poland
- Tin Ujević, Žedan kamen na studencu ("Thirsty stone at the wellspring"), Croatian

== Awards and honors ==
- National Book Award for Poetry: Conrad Aiken, Collected Poems
- Pulitzer Prize for Poetry: Theodore Roethke: The Waking
- King's Gold Medal for Poetry: Ralph Hodgson
- Bollingen Prize: W. H. Auden
- Fellowship of the Academy of American Poets: Louise Townsend Nicholl and Oliver St. John Gogarty
- Australia: Grace Leven Prize for Poetry: John Thompson, Thirty Poems
- Canada: Governor General's Award, poetry or drama: The Metal and the Flower, P. K. Page

== Births ==
Death years link to the corresponding "[year] in poetry" article:

- February 9 – Ian Duhig, English poet
- February 13 – Vijay Seshadri, Indian poet, essayist and literary critic who emigrates to the United States c. 1959
- February 21 – Francisco X. Alarcón (died 2016), Mexican-American poet
- February 27 – Thylias Moss, African-American poet, writer and playwright
- March 4 – Irina Ratushinskaya, Russian samizdat poet
- March 26 – Dorothy Porter (died 2008), Australian
- April 17 – Erín Moure, Canadian
- May 5 – Hamid Ismailov, Uzbek writer
- May 25 – Alexei Parshchikov (died 2009), Russian poet, critic and translator who emigrates to the United States in 1991
- July 5 – Kevin Hart, Australian
- July 19 – Jane Eaton Hamilton, Canadian short story writer, poet and photographer
- July 31 – Kim Addonizio, American poet and novelist
- August 6 – Lorna Dee Cervantes, American poet
- August 8 – Yu Jian, China
- August 15 – Mary Jo Salter, American
- October 15 – Peter Bakowski, Australian
- November 10 – Joy Goswami, Indian Bengali poet (a man)
- December 5 – Lynda Hull, American
- December 20 – Sandra Cisneros, American poet and author
- December 27 – David Baker, American
- Also:
  - Catherine Anderson (poet), American
  - Robert Boates, Canadian
  - Brother Resistance, Trinidadian (died 2021)
  - Janet Charman, New Zealand
  - Imtiaz Dharker, Pakistan-born British
  - Cornelius Eady, African American
  - David Hallett, Australian
  - Sotiris Kakisis, Greek
  - Jan Heller Levi, American
  - Ahmed Matar, Iraqi poet
  - Ibrahim Nasrallah, Jordanian-Palestinian poet and novelist
  - Luis J. Rodriguez, American poet, novelist, journalist, critic and columnist
  - Stephen Sartarelli, poet and translator
  - Deb Westbury (died 2018), Australian

== Deaths ==
Birth years link to the corresponding "[year] in poetry" article:

- January 1 – Leonard Bacon, 66 (born 1887), American poet
- February 6 – Maxwell Bodenheim, 62 (born 1892), American poet and novelist known as the "King of Greenwich Village Bohemians", murdered
- March 28 – Francis Brett Young, 73 (born 1884), English novelist and poet
- August 3 – Fumiko Nakajo 中城ふみ子, pen name of Noe Fumiko 野江富美子, 32 (born 1922), Japanese tanka poet who dies young after a turbulent life and struggle with breast cancer, as recorded in her poetry (surname: Nakajo)
- August 18 – Samukawa Sokotsu 寒川鼠骨 (born 1875), Japanese, Meiji period haiku poet; Masaoka Shiki's pupil.
- October 22
  - Jibanananda Das (born 1899), Bengali poet
  - Oswald de Andrade (born 1890), Brazilian poet and polemicist

== See also ==
- Poetry
- List of poetry awards
- List of years in poetry
