= LGBTQ literature in Australia =

LGBTIQ+ literature in Australia, or queer literature, refers to Australian literature that is written by, portrays or reflects the experiences of gay, lesbian, bisexual, transgender, intersex and queer people. The definition of what constitutes queer literature in Australia is evolving and open to debate.

== 20th century ==
For the greater part of the 20th century, literature that discussed or represented homosexuality was tightly restricted by censorship in Australia. Before a national censorship authority was established, Australian Customs officers used their own discretion to confiscate books they deemed to contain obscenity, blasphemy or sedition. After the establishment of the Book Censorship Board in 1933, prohibition or restricted circulation of literature considered to contain homosexual content continued to be strictly enforced, sometimes with the risk of criminal prosecution.

Examples of LGBTQ literature subject to bans or restrictions in Australia in this period included The Magnificent by Terence Lucy Greenidge, The City and the Pillar by Gore Vidal, The Divided Path by Nial Kent, and Another Country by James Baldwin. The Young Desire It (1937), written by Australian author Seaforth Mackenzie, and published in the UK, was a rare exception in being permitted entry into Australia despite the Board considering it to contain homosexual content. MacKenzie's novel won the 1937 Australian Literature Society Gold Medal.

No End to the Way, which was written by G. M. Glaskin under the pseudonym Neville Jackson, and banned from 1965 to 1966, is generally regarded to be the first openly homosexual Australian novel.

=== 1970s and 1980s ===
The emergence of the gay liberation movement in the 1970s led to increased visibility and validity for queer culture and literature.

In the 1980s, the outbreak of HIV/AIDS had a profound impact on the LGBT community, and the literature reflects the challenges faced by people with the disease.

In 1982, two years after New South Wales decriminalised sexual intercourse between two men, Wayne Harrison and Les McDonald opened The Darlinghurst Bookshop, the oldest and most iconic bookshop in the LGBT community of Australia. The Darlinghurst Bookshop became a central point for meeting and providing support for those who wanted to come out of the closet. During the HIV/AIDS crisis, the bookstore became an important source of information about the topic. Also, collaborating with relevant events and easing the journey for other LGBT businesses in a time of discrimination and hostility.

=== 1990s ===
The 1990s marked a significant increase in the production of LGBT literature in Australia. Emerging and established authors started to explore a wide range of sexual and gender identities and their works reflected a greater diversity and representation of the LGBT community.

In 1990, an award-winning novel and stage adaptation of Two Weeks with the Queen by Morris Gleitzman was published. While controversial, it was a pioneer in the field of homosexuality and the HIV/AIDS crisis.

In 1994, The Monkey's Mask by Dorothy Porter was published. It is a crime novel in verse that tells the story of a queer detective who enters the dangerous streets of Sydney. This work has been adapted for radio, television, and film, and has been published in multiple languages. Also, the author has won awards with the first The Age Book of the Year and the National Book Council Award for this narrative poetry.

The featured Loaded by Christos Tsiolkas, published in 1995 and the autobiography Holding the Man by Timothy Conigrave from the same year, which tell the history of love and loss of two gay men in the middle of the AIDS crisis in 1980.

== 21st Century ==
Australian LGBT literature has experienced a flowering in the 21st century, with a greater inclusion of LGBT characters and themes in diverse literary forms. Much of the literature, both fiction and non-fiction, has been fundamental to give a voice to the experiences and struggles of the LGBT community.

In 2015, some children's literature also took on queer and diverse topics, with numerous novels exploring the intersectionality between sexual identity, race, disability, and mental health like Becoming Kirrali Lewis, Cloudwish, The Flywheel and The Foretelling of Georgie Spider.

Notable works of sapphic literature include poetry like Heat and Light by Ellen van Neerven in 2014 and Lemons in the Chicken Wire by Alison Whittaker in 2016; and in novels like Too Much Lip by Melissa Lucashenko in 2018.

In non-fiction literature, notable works include Growing Up Queer in Australia from 2019, an anthology made by the journalist Benjamin Law.

In 2022, notable masculine gay novels include Son of Sin by Omar Sakr, Losing Face by George Haddad and My Heart Is A Little Wild Thing by Nigel Featherstone.
