= 1882 in Australian literature =

This article presents a list of the historical events and publications of Australian literature during 1882.

== Books ==
- Rolf Boldrewood — Robbery Under Arms
- Rosa Praed — Nadine : The Study of a Woman

== Poetry ==
- Rolf Boldrewood
  - "The Bushman's Lullaby"
  - "Perdita"
- Victor J. Daley — "The First of May"
- John Farrell — Two Stories : A Fragmentary Poem
- Henry Kendall — "Outre Mer"

== Biography ==
- Rolf Boldrewood — Old Melbourne Memories

== Births ==
A list, ordered by date of birth (and, if the date is either unspecified or repeated, ordered alphabetically by surname) of births in 1882 of Australian literary figures, authors of written works or literature-related individuals follows, including year of death.

- 24 March — Enid Derham, poet and academic (died 1941)
- 18 July — Alice Grant Rosman, poet (died 1961)
- 22 July — Frederic Manning, poet (died 1935)
- 2 August — Ruth Bedford, poet (died 1963)
- 22 September — Annie Rattray Rentoul, children's poet and story writer (died 1978)
- 23 September — Brian Vrepont, poet (died 1955)

Unknown date

- Harold Mercer, poet and short story writer (died 1952)

== Deaths ==
A list, ordered by date of death (and, if the date is either unspecified or repeated, ordered alphabetically by surname) of deaths in 1882 of Australian literary figures, authors of written works or literature-related individuals follows, including year of birth.

- 1 August — Henry Kendall, poet (born 1839)
- 2 December — Eliza Winstanley, writer and stage actress (born 1818 in England)

== See also ==
- 1882 in Australia
- 1882 in literature
- 1882 in poetry
- List of years in Australian literature
- List of years in literature
