= Anna Morgan =

Anna Morgan may refer to:

== People ==
- Anna Morgan (teacher) (1851-1936), American drama teacher from Chicago
- Ann Haven Morgan (born "Anna" 1882–1966), American zoologist and ecologist

== Fictional characters ==
- Anna Morgan, character in The Ring (2002 film)
- Anna Morgan, character in Voyage in the Dark
- Anna Morgan, character in Anna's Dream

== See also ==
- Ann Morgan (disambiguation)
- Anne Morgan (disambiguation)
