= Boates =

Boates may refer to:

- a Gallic tribe in present Gascony, whose civitas Boatium (pays de Born) was among the components of the Roman province of Novempopulania (Aquitania Tertia)

Individuals

- Brent Boates
- Robert Boates
