= Anne Morgan =

Anne Morgan may refer to:

- Anne Morgan (author) (born 1954), Australian writer
- Anne Morgan (philanthropist) (1873–1952), American relief worker
- Anne Morgan, Baroness Hunsdon (1529–1607), English noblewoman
- Anne Morgan (make-up artist), Academy Award winner

== See also ==
- Ann Morgan (disambiguation)
- Anna Morgan (disambiguation)
