= Ann Morgan =

Ann Morgan may refer to:

- Ann Morgan Guilbert (1928–2016), American actress
- Ann Haven Morgan (1882–1966), American zoologist

== See also ==
- Anne Morgan (disambiguation)
- Anna Morgan (disambiguation)
