= More Than Robbery =

British television series

- Genre: Thriller
- Written by: Raymond Bowers
- Directed by: Shaun Sutton
- Starring: Terence Morgan; Helen Cherry
- Country of origin: United Kingdom
- Original language: English
- No. of series: 1
- No. of episodes: 6

Production
- Producer: Shaun Sutton
- Running time: 30 minutes
- Production company: BBC

Original release
- Network: BBC 1
- Release: 12 February – 19 March 1958

More Than Robbery is a British television three-part thriller that originally aired on the BBC in 1958.

== Main cast ==
- Terence Morgan as Durbin
- Helen Cherry as Norma Tredford
- Owen Holder as Morley
- David Horne as Dr Nesbitt
- Richard Wordsworth as Tredford
- Patricia Cree as Miss Li
- John Brooking as Bartrup
- Yah Ming as Willie

== Bibliography ==
- Baskin, Ellen . Serials on British Television, 1950-1994. Scolar Press, 1996.
