= In Writing =

Australian television play

- Based on: play by Raymond Bowers
- Directed by: Kevin Shine
- Country of origin: Australia
- Original language: English

Production
- Running time: 75 minutes
- Production company: ABC

Original release
- Network: ABC
- Release: 7 June 1961 (Sydney)
- Release: 2 August 1961 (Melbourne)
- Release: 6 May 1962 (Brisbane)

In Writing is a 1961 Australian television play by an Australian writer living in London, Raymond Bowers, and directed by Kevin Shine.

It was first presented on the BBC in London in 1956 and was also presented on stage and radio.

Australian TV drama was relatively rare at the time. It was one of several thrillers filmed in the early days of Australian television.

== Plot ==
An unusual murder involving a husband and wife occurs in London, which is investigated in an unorthodox manner by Detective-Inspector Hurst. James Peebles has befriended John Clostin's wife and Clostin is unhappy with that.

== Cast ==
- Leonard Teale as Detective Inspector Hurst
- Ric Hutton as John Clostin
- Anne Haddy as Mrs Clostin
- James Workman as Pr Bowman
- Richard Parry as James Peebles
- Jack Ford as Sergeant
- Carolyn Keely as waitress

== Production ==
The play was produced for British television in 1956 with a cast including Bernard Lee and Terence Morgan.

It was Bowers' second script done for Australian television, the first being It's the Geography That Counts.

The play was also performed on Australian radio in 1961.

== Reception ==
The Sydney Morning Herald called it an "unpretentious little suspense play which several times tripped over its own excess of ingenuity" and "suppressed far too many major facts to play fair with the audience."
