= The Death of the Bird =

1955 poem by Australian poet A. D. Hope

- by A. D. Hope
- Country: Australia
- Language: English
- Publisher: The Wandering Islands by A. D. Hope
- Publication date: 1955
- Lines: 36

"The Death of the Bird" (1955) is a poem by Australian poet A. D. Hope.

It was originally published in the poet's collection The Wandering Islands, and was subsequently reprinted in other collections by the poet as well as a number of Australian poetry anthologies.

== Critical reception ==
In reviewing the poet's back catalog critic Peter Craven noted that Hope is "the author of poems of great poignancy and delicacy that take a transient feature of nature and invest it with the face of a grief that is accepting but uncomforted. 'The Death of the Bird' is the most notable example and it is one of the finer short poems the 20th century produced."

== Publication history ==
After the poem's initial publication in The Wandering Islands it was reprinted as follows:

- The Penguin Book of Australian Verse edited by John Thompson, Kenneth Slessor and R. G. Howarth, Penguin Books, 1958
- Australian Poets Speak edited by Colin Thiele and Ian Mudie, Rigby, 1961
- Makar no. 7, June 1961
- Modern Australian Verse edited by Douglas Stewart, Angus and Robertson, 1964
- A Book of Australian Verse edited by Judith Wright, Oxford University Press, 1968
- Silence Into Song : An Anthology of Australian Verse edited by Clifford O'Brien, Rigby, 1968
- Collected Poems 1930-1965 by A. D. Hope, Angus and Robertson, 1972
- The Penguin Book of Australian Verse edited by Harry Heseltine, Penguin Books, 1972
- Selected Poems by A. D. Hope, Angus and Robertson, 1973
- Australian Verse from 1805 : A Continuum edited by Geoffrey Dutton, Rigby, 1976
- This World : An Anthology of Poetry for Young People edited by M. M. Flynn and J. Groom, Pergamon Press, 1976
- The World's Contracted Thus edited by J. A. McKenzie and J. K. McKenzie, Heinemann Education, 1983
- Cross-Country : A Book of Australian Verse edited by John Barnes and Brian MacFarlane, Heinemann, 1984
- My Country : Australian Poetry and Short Stories, Two Hundred Years edited by Leonie Kramer, Lansdowne, 1985
- An Anthology of Commonwealth Poetry edited by C. D. Narasimhaiah, Macmillan, 1990
- The Faber Book of Modern Australian Verse edited by Vincent Buckley, Faber, 1991
- The Penguin Book of Modern Australian Poetry edited by John Tranter and Philip Mead, Penguin, 1991
- Selected Poems by A. D. Hope, edited by David Brooks, Angus and Robertson, 1992
- An Anthology of Australian Literature edited by Ch'oe Chin-yong and Cynthia Van Den Driesen, Hansin Munhwasa, 1995
- The Scythe Honed Fine : A.D. Hope, A Celebration for his 90th Birthday, National Library of Australia, 1997
- A. D. Hope : Selected Poetry and Prose by A. D. Hope, edited by David Brooks, Halstead Press, 2000
- Sunlines : An Anthology of Poetry to Celebrate Australia's Harmony in Diversity edited by Anne Fairbairn, Dept of Immigration and Multicultural and Indigenous Affairs, 2002
- Seven Centuries of Poetry in English edited by John Leonard, Oxford University Press, 2003
- The Penguin Anthology of Australian Poetry edited by John Kinsella, Penguin, 2009
- Macquarie PEN Anthology of Australian Literature edited by Nicholas Jose, Kerryn Goldsworthy, Anita Heiss, David McCooey, Peter Minter, Nicole Moore, and Elizabeth Webby, Allen and Unwin, 2009
- Australian Poetry Since 1788 edited by Geoffrey Lehmann and Robert Gray , University of NSW Press, 2011
- Love is Strong as Death edited by Paul Kelly, Hamish Hamilton, 2019

== Notes ==
- The full text of the poem is available on the Poetry Library archived website.

== See also ==
- 1955 in Australian literature
- 1955 in poetry
