= Try Anything Once (book) =

1933 Australian autobiography by Frank Clune

Try Anything Once: The Autobiography of a Wanderer
- Author: Frank Clune
- Language: English
- Genre: Autobiography
- Publisher: Angus and Robertson
- Publication date: 1933
- Publication place: Australia
- Media type: Print
- Pages: 268 pp.

Try Anything Once: The Autobiography of a Wanderer is a 1933 Australian autobiography by Frank Clune.

It was his first published book and sold well, launching his career. He followed it with a series of similar travel books.

The Bulletin said "It supplies a pitilessly realistic picture of a human pest; one who is restless, inquisitive, in love with life, interested in everything, the bane of all in authority; a dry humorist, as senselessly malignant as a child, as quick-thinking as a good criminal defender, as combative and courageous as a bull-ant."

Clune later had a show on ABC radio in 1939 called Try Anything Once.
