= Jimmy Governor (book) =

1959 Australian book by Frank Clune

Jimmy Governor is a 1959 Australian book by Frank Clune about Jimmy Governor.

Clune had written about Governor as early as 1940 but this was the first full-length work on the outlaw.

The book was an inspiration for The Chant of Jimmie Blacksmith.

The book was re-published in 1978.
