= It's the Geography That Counts =

It's the Geography That Counts is a 1957 play by Australian writer Raymond Bowers.

== Premise ==
Marshall Arnitt is a racing car driver who has spent the weekend with his mother in the south of England. His foster brother James has borrowed Marshall's car without permission and hits a cyclist on the Scottish border.

Marshall decides to take the blame. But then James hears that their mother has been murdered, and Marshall has engineered clues so that James will take the fall.

== Original play ==
It premiered in St James Theatre in London in June 1957 in a production starring John Gregson, that actor's first appearance on stage in six years. It would be the last production held at St James Theatre

=== Original cast ===
- John Gregson as Marshal Armitt
- John Stratton as James Armitt
- Jane Griffiths as Mercia
- Liam Redmond as Hurst
- Jack Hedley as Daniels
- Michael Duffield as Parker

=== Reception ===
Variety said "Too much talk and an over-complication of plot mar this otherwise ingenious whodunit. Basically It is a good dramatic story, but the first half consists practically of an involved duolog, with the first real punch Coming at halftime... a good play doctor could streamline this first' effort of a Fleet Street newspaperman, and it could be improved if skilfully adapted to the screen."

The London Times said it "looks to have the necessary staying power... the result is dryly entertaining."

Variety said the production was a financial failure.

"My first aim is to make money," Bowers said in 1957. "To do that you have to entertain. If I have any philosophising to do, I'll leave it until I'm well established."

== Other adaptations ==
It was adapted for Australian radio in 1958 as The Man in Question.

== 1961 British TV adaptation - Listen James ==
It was filmed by the BBC in 1961 as Listen James.

The Times called it "as engaging and effective a piece of mystification as we have been offered for some time... it is a puzzle and not a play of character."

== 1960 Australian TV play ==
It's the Geography That Counts
- Based on: Play by Raymond Bowers
- Directed by: Christopher Muir
- Country of origin: Australia
- Original language: English

Production
- Running time: 65 mins
- Production company: ABC

Original release
- Network: ABC
- Release: 2 November 1960 (Melbourne)

The play was adapted for Australian television in 1960. Filmed in Melbourne, it was directed by Chris Muir, who said "all the clues are contained in the dialogue, but it is cleverly concealed. It will be a fairly tough test for the amateur detectives."

It is unclear if the program was broadcast outside Melbourne.

The ABC later filmed In Writing (1961), also from a script by Bowers. It was one of several thrillers filmed in the early days of Australian television.

=== Cast ===
- Marie Redshaw as Marcia
- Keith Eden as Marshall Amitt, a racing driver
- Kenneth Goodlet as Inspector Hurst
- Marie Redshaw as Mercia Sparling
- Brian Burton as Det-Sgt Daniels
- William Lloyd as Parker
