= Catherine Cole =

Australian writer

- Occupations: Writer and academic

Academic work
- Institutions: University of Wollongong; RMIT University; University of Technology Sydney

Catherine Cole is an Australian author and academic. She lives between Australia, South West France and the UK. Cole's work in the fields of fiction, poetry, non-fiction, and academic writing has been widely published both in Australia in the UK, US, China and Vietnam.

Her book Dry Dock was a finalist for the 2000 Ned Kelly Award for Best First Novel. In 2015, her short story "Forever Re-Starting" was commended for the Elizabeth Jolley Short Story Prize. Cole also has judged some of Australia's leading writing prizes.

As a professor of creative writing at both the University of Wollongong and RMIT University, Melbourne and as a senior lecturer at University of Technology, Sydney, Cole has supervised some of Australia's leading and emerging writers in their postgraduate degrees.

== Literary career ==
Cole began her literary career publishing poetry in a range of Australian poetry journals with the support of her mentor, A.D. Hope, whom she later wrote about in her memoir, The Poet Who Forgot (2008). Her first published prose fiction was short story, followed by the novels Dry Dock (1999), Skin Deep (2005), then The Grave at Thu Le (2006), which examines French colonialism in Vietnam.

Cole's Private Dicks and Feisty Chicks, published in 1996, explores the lure of crime fiction and its increasing popularity across international cultures. In 2009, Cole, along with Vicki Karaminas and Peter McNeil, co-edited Fashion in Fiction, Fashion in Textiles, Television and Film. In 2010, her lifelong fascination with Vietnam was further explored in the collection The Perfume River: Writing from Vietnam.

Some of Cole's recent short stories have been published in Australian journals and anthologies and have been produced by and read on BBC Radio 4.

== Residences ==
- 2015: Inaugural Visiting Writing Fellow, Sun Yat-Sen University, Guangzhou, China
- 2008: Visiting Fellow, University of East Anglia, United Kingdom
- 2002: Writer in Residence, Keesing Studio, Cite International des Arts, Paris, France
- 2001: Asialink Fellow, The Gioi Publishing, Hanoi, Vietnam

== Awards and honours ==
Cole has won, been shortlisted, and/or been commended for the following awards:

- 2000: Ned Kelly Award for Best First Novel, Dry Dock, finalist
- 2002: Ned Kelly Award for Best Novel, Skin Deep, finalist
- 2003: Davitt Award for Australian Crime Writing, Readers' Choice Award, winner for Skin Deep
- 2004: Ned Kelly Award for Best Novel, Private Dicks and Feisty Chicks, finalist
- 2005: Asher Literary Award, commended for The Grace at Thu Le
- 2015: Elizabeth Jolley Short Story Prize, "Forever Re-Starting", commended tile
- 2015: Fool For Poetry International Chapbook Competition, finalist
- 2018: Christina Stead Prize for Fiction, NSW Premier's Literary Awards, shortlisted for Seabirds Crying in the Harbour Dark
- Munster Poetry Prize
- Peter Blazey Prize for Non-Fiction Manuscript

Cole also has judged some of Australia's leading writing prizes, including the Age Book of the Year, the Barbara Jefferis Award, and The National Jazz Writing Competition.

== Publications ==
=== Books ===
==== Non-fiction ====
- Private Dicks and Feisty Chicks : an interrogation of crime fiction. Curtin University Books. 2004. ISBN 9781920731281.
- The poet who forgot. Crawley, W.A: University of Western Australia Press. 1 January 2008. ISBN 9781921401046.
- Slipstream: On Memory and Migration. Valley Press. 2023. ISBN 9781915606341.
- A French House: On the Love of Place. Valley Press. 2026. ISBN 9781915606679.

==== Fiction ====
- Dry dock. Duffy & Snellgrove. 1 January 2002. ISBN 9781876631291.
- Skin deep. Duffy & Snellgrove. 1 January 2002. ISBN 1876631201.
- The grave at Thu Le. Sydney: Pan Macmillan Australia. 1 January 2005. ISBN 0330421689.
- Sleep. UWA Publishing. 2019. ISBN 978-1-76080-092-5.

==== Short story collections ====
- The Perfume River: An Anthology of Writing From Vietnam. UWA Publishing. 2010.
- Seabirds Crying in the Harbour Dark. UWA Publishing. 2017. ISBN 9781742589503.

=== Short stories ===
- "Creative Work: The Rabbit". Animal Studies Journal. 3 (2): 57–60. 2014.
- The Sleepers Almanac. Sleepers Publishing. 2014. Archived from the original on 14 March 2016.
- Kennedy, Cate (ed.). The Best Australian Stories 2011. Black Inc.
- Her Annotated Hair, 2009, Trunk: Hair #1

=== Poetry ===
- "Poem: Animal Dreaming". Animal Studies Journal. 2 (1). 1 January 2013. ISSN 2201-3008.
- "Looking for Serge Gainsbourg". Mascara Literary Review. 3 June 2013.
- "Leda" (PDF). Transnational Literature. 6 (1). November 2013.
- "War Aphorisms". Mascara Literary Review (17). April 2015.
- "Jim Morrison - Pere Lachaise "A séance"". Tincture Journal. Archived from the original on 15 August 2016.

=== Essays and reviews ===
- "Wish I'd Written That". Crime Factory. 3. 2001.
- "Research". Crime Factory. 6. 2002. Archived from the original on 8 January 2017.
- "The Third and Fourth Countries". Griffith Review. 6. Summer 2005. Archived from the original on 8 January 2017.
- "A Tale of Two Cities". Australian Author. 37 (2). 2005.
- "Henry James, Affect and the Writer/Researcher". Text Journal. 16 (2). 2006.
- "Teaching James Joyce in the Creative Writing Workshop". Eureka Studies in Teaching Short Fiction. 7 (2). 2007. Archived from the original on 8 January 2017.
- "Postcard from a Paris Dawn". Australian Author. 39 (2). 2007. Archived from the original on 30 July 2016.
- "How the University Workshop Hinders New Writers from Engaging with Ideas (And what to do about it)". Segue: Writing on Writing. July 2007.
- "Homecoming and a Hard Climb". The Weekend Australian. 2008. Archived from the original on 8 January 2017.
- "S & M Thriller Needs Fleshing Out". The Weekend Australian. 2008. Archived from the original on 8 January 2017.
- "Learning to write". Griffith Review. 26. 2009.
- "Writing in the Contemporary Academy". Second Nature: International Journal of Creative Media. 1 (1). 2009. Archived from the original on 8 January 2017.
- "Literary Communities: writers' practices and networks". The Strange Bedfellows or Perfect Partners Papers. Co-written with Marcelle Freiman and Donna Lee Brien. The Australasian Association of Writing Programs. 2010. ISBN 978-0-9807573-3-0.
- "History and postmemory in contemporary Vietnamese literature". Text Journal. 10. Co-written with Marsha Berry. 1 January 2011.
- "Review of "Murdering Stepmothers - The Execution of Martha Rendell" by Anna Haebich". Studies in Western Australian History. 27: 217–219. 2011.
- "The Program Era: Review by Catherine Cole". Text Journal. 15 (2): 1–5. 2011.
- Nelson, Anitra; Cole, Catherine (1 January 2012). "Productive Creative Writers' Relationships: A Communities-of-Practice Framework". New Writing. 9 (3): 396–407. doi:10.1080/14790726.2012.693095. S2CID 144221104.
- "The Boat". Reading Australia. 2013.
- "Review: "konkretion" by Marion May Campbell". Mascara Literary Review. 13: 1–2. 2013.
- "Diverse voices in celebration of poetry". Text Journal. 18 (1). April 2014. Archived from the original on 29 February 2016.

=== Other works ===
- Travelling Partners: Using Literary Studies to Support Creative Writing about Real Spaces Conference of the Australian Association of Writing Programs. Eds. Brien D., Cole C., & Freiman M. (Lobb, J.)
- Fashion in Fiction: Text and Clothing in Literature, Film and Television. Co-edited with Peter McNeil and Vicki Karaminas. Bloomsbury. 2009.

=== Radio ===
- The Road to Austinmer Beach, 2014 June, BBC Radio Four
