= At Cooloolah =

1954 poem by Judith Wright

- by Judith Wright
- First published in: The Bulletin
- Country: Australia
- Language: English
- Publication date: 7 July 1954
- Preceded by: "Flesh" (poem)
- Followed by: "The Red Satin Eiderdown" (short story)

At Cooloolah is a poem by Australian poet Judith Wright. It was first published in The Bulletin magazine on 7 July 1954, and later in the poet's poetry collection The Two Fires (1955). The poem has also been printed under the titles "At Cooloola" and "At Lake Coolooah".

== Outline ==
The poem is an examination of the Australian black-white relationship from a new angle. The poet speaks for all European people who have inhabited Australia.

== Analysis ==
In an essay titled "Aboriginal Writers in Australia", published in Tharunka, John B. Beston notes: "Of all the white poets, Judith Wright has the deepest sense of Australia's past, before and after European settlement. In her poem "At Cooloolah" she reminds us that:

Those dark-skinned people who once named Cooloolah
knew that no land is lost by wars,
for earth is spirit: the invader's feet will tangle
in nets there and his blood be thinned by fears.

In his opening address for "2015 Reminiscence - A Tribute to Judith Wright" (5 December 2015 – 15 January 2016, Judith Wright Arts Centre), Matt Foley stated:
"Judith was a founding member of the Wildlife Preservation Society of Queensland in 1962. She campaigned hard to protect the Cooloola coloured sands against mining and to defend the Great Barrier reef and Fraser Island, much to the manifest displeasure of the then reactionary, oppressive Queensland Coalition government.

"Judith challenged us not only to see the multi-coloured beauty of our land, its flora and wildlife but also to take political action to preserve this beauty against the mindless ravages of unbridled mining and commerce. She dared us not just to see the scalding truth of the dispossession and exploitation of Aboriginal land and society, but also to take political action to redress this grinding injustice. Judith transcended the arid distinction between art and politics."

== Publication history ==
- The Two Fires (1955)
- Five Senses : Selected Poems by Judith Wright, Angus and Robertson (1963)
- Judith Wright : Collected Poems, 1942-1970 by Judith Wright (1971)
- My Country : Australian Poetry and Short Stories, Two Hundred Years edited by Leonie Kramer (1985)
- Two Centuries of Australian Poetry edited by Mark O'Connor (1988)
- A Human Pattern : Selected Poems by Judith Wright (1990)
- The Penguin Book of Modern Australian Poetry edited by John Tranter and Philip Mead (1991)
- Australian Poetry in the Twentieth Century edited by Robert Gray and Geoffrey Lehmann, Heinemann, 1991
- Collected Poems 1942-1985 by Judith Wright (1994)
- The Oxford Book of Australian Women's Verse edited by Susan Lever (1995)
- Australian Verse : An Oxford Anthology edited by John Leonard (1998)
- Poetry Review vol. 89 no. 1 Spring, 1999, p57
- Overland no. 154, Autumn 1999, p36
- Sunlines : An Anthology of Poetry to Celebrate Australia's Harmony in Diversity edited by Anne Fairbairn (2002)
- Hot Iron Corrugated Sky : 100 Years of Queensland Writing edited by Robyn Sheahan-Bright and Stuart Glover (2002)
- The Penguin Anthology of Australian Poetry edited by John Kinsella (2009)
- Macquarie PEN Anthology of Australian Literature edited by Nicholas Jose, Kerryn Goldsworthy, Anita Heiss, David McCooey, Peter Minter, Nicole Moore and Elizabeth Webby (2009)
- The Puncher & Wattmann Anthology of Australian Poetry edited by John Leonard (2009)
- Australian Poetry Since 1788 edited by Geoffrey Lehmann and Robert Gray (2011)
- Sense, Shape, Symbol : An Investigation of Australian Poetry edited by Brian Keyte (2013)

== See also ==
- 1954 in poetry
- 1954 in literature
- 1954 in Australian literature
- Australian literature
