= Young Shakespeare (radio play) =

1937 Australian radio drama

Wireless Weekly 19 April 1941

Young Shakesepeare is a 1937 Australian radio drama by Kenneth Mackenzie about William Shakespeare.

It is a verse drama and one of the most acclaimed in that format produced in Australia.

According to Leslie Rees it "freshly interpreted the relations between Anne and the fledgling William —the restless youth, driven to leave Stratford because sudden realisation of a woman’s deceit had dried up the love running in his veins."

The play was popular and was produced again in 1941. This production was called one of the best radio plays of the year.

A copy of the play is at the Fryer Library, University of Queensland.

== Premise ==
The romance between Will Shakespeare and Ann Hathaway.
