= Thelma Clune =

Australian sculptor, painter, patron of the arts and gallery owner

Thelma Clune AO
- Born: Thelma Cecily Smith; 11 March 1900; Kings Cross, New South Wales
- Died: 6 September 1992 (aged 92)
- Occupations: Art curator, artist
- Spouse: Frank Clune

Thelma Cecily Clune AO (11 March 1900 – 6 September 1992) was an Australian sculptor, painter, patron of the arts and gallery owner.

== Early life ==
Thelma Cecily Smith was born in Kings Cross in 1900 and she later moved with her family to Yarramalong. Clune attended school at St Mary's and studied shorthand and typing.

== Career ==
Clune studied sculpture under Lyndon Dadswell at East Sydney Technical College. She produced sculptural works in stone and metal. Clune began painting in the 1940s, working in oils, and later produced collages on paper. She held her first solo exhibition, "Collages and Sculptures", in 1979 at the Hogarth Galleries in Paddington.

Clune appeared in her husband Frank Clune's newspaper columns as the character "Brown Eyes".

In the 1940s, Thelma and Frank Clune opened an art gallery in Kings Cross. It housed works by many of Australia's best known painters, including Russell Drysdale, John Passmore and John Olsen.

In the 1950s and 1960s, with their younger son Terry Clune, they ran the Terry Clune Art Gallery on Macleay Street in Potts Point. This gallery supported many of Sydney's young expressionist and experimental painters, including John Olsen, Stan Rapotec, Robert Klippel, Robert Hughes, Carl Plate, Margo Lewers, Elwyn Lynn, John Rigby, Desiderius Orban and Robert Dickerson. The Clunes also provided accommodation to artists in a building adjacent to the gallery, and in their home. The Macleay Street building later became the home of artist Martin Sharp and became known as the Sydney landmark the "Yellow House".

Thelma and Frank Clune were patrons and friends of many significant Australian artists, including William Dobell. Dobell's 1946 portrait of Thelma Clune is held by the Art Gallery of New South Wales. Susan Rothwell's bronze sculpture of Thelma Clune was a finalist in the 1984 Archibald Prize.

Interviews of Clune by Hazel de Berg and Geoffrey Dutton are part of the National Library of Australia collection.

== Awards ==
In 1988 Thelma Clune was appointed Member of the Order of Australia (AM) for service to the visual arts. She was later appointed Officer of the Order of Australia (AO) for distinguished service to the arts.

== Personal life ==
On 9 May 1923 Thelma Cecily Smith married Frank Clune, the Australian author and popular historian. They had two sons, Anthony Patrick (1930–2002) and Terry Michael (born 1932).

== See also ==
- Frank Clune
