= The Tichborne Affair =

- Written by: James Workman; Brian Faull
- Directed by: Carl Schultz
- Starring: Hugh Keays-Byrne; Neil Fitzpatrick; Ken Goodlet
- Country of origin: Australia
- Original language: English

Production
- Producer: Carl Schultz
- Running time: 75 mins
- Production company: ABC

Original release
- Network: ABC
- Release: 10 February 1977

The Tichborne Affair is a 1977 Australian television film directed by Carl Schultz and starring Hugh Keays-Byrne, Neil Fitzpatrick, and Ken Goodlet. It is based on the Tichborne case.

== Plot ==
Lady Tichborne seeks her missing son. A Wagga Wagga solicitor thinks it is the local butcher Tom Castro.

== Cast ==
- Hugh Keays-Byrne as Tichborne / Tom Castro
- Aileen Britton as Mrs Skinner
- Sandra McGregor as Mary Ann Tichborne
- Phillip Hinton as Holmes
- Kevin Miles as Defence Counsel
- Brian Blain as Hopkins
- Tony Wager as Brown
- Neil Fitzpatrick as Dr Kenealy
- Peter Gwynne as Bowker
- Ken Goodlet as William Gibbes
- Peter Whitford as Cubitt
- Tim Elliott as Gosford
- John Gaden
- Melissa Jaffer

== Production ==
It was shot in the ABC's Sydney studios.

== Awards ==
The film won Best One Shot Drama and Best Director at the Penguin Awards.
