= Raymond Bowers (writer) =

Australian writer

- Born: 1919/1920; Australia

Raymond Bowers (born 1919/1920) was an Australian writer who mostly worked in London. He worked as a journalist in Perth, writing for amateur theatre. In 1954, at age 34, he went to London in order to improve his chances of having his work done professionally. His breakthrough play was In Writing in 1956, later done for Australian television. "My first aim is to make money," he said in 1957. "To do that you have to entertain. If I have any philosophising to do, I'll leave it until I'm well established."

== Select credits ==
- In Writing (1956) - BBC TV play
- Opportunity Murder (1956) - TV series
- It's the Geography That Counts (1957) - play
- More Than Robbery (1958) - TV series
- Here Lies Miss Sabry (1960) - British TV series
- It's the Geography That Counts (1960) - Australian TV play, based on his play
- Deadline Midnight (1960) - British TV series
- In Writing (1961) - Australian TV Play
- Listen James (1961) - British TV play based on his play It's the Geography that Counts
- It Happened Like This (1962) - British TV series
- The Clostin Case (1962) play
- The Right Thing (1963) - Australian TV play
- The Plane Makers (1965–66) - TV series
- The Rat Catchers (1966) - British TV series
- The Power Game (1967–68) - British TV series
- Crossroads - TV series
