= The Refuge (novel) =

1954 novel by Kenneth Mackenzie

- First edition
- Author: Kenneth Mackenzie
- Language: English
- Publisher: Angus and Robertson
- Publication date: 1954
- Publication place: Australia
- Media type: Print
- Pages: 343 pp
- Preceded by: Dead Men Rising
- Followed by: –

The Refuge (1954) is the final novel by Australian author Kenneth Mackenzie.

== Plot summary ==
Late one night Lloyd Fitzherbert, who works as a police reporter for the Sydney Gazette, is called to Sydney Harbour where the body of a young woman has been found. The woman is Fitzherbert's lover and, as is immediately obvious, he is the one who killed her.

== See also ==
- 1954 in Australian literature

== Notes ==
- Dedication: To G. A. Ferguson, Esquire in friendship.
- Text Publishing re-issued the novel in 2015 as a part of their "Text Classics" series. This edition carried an introduction by Nicholas Rothwell.

== Reviews ==
Reviewing the 2015 re-issue of the novel, Peter Craven, in The Sydney Morning Herald, noted that the novel "is some kind of psychological thriller and it is not one of the books by which all others are to be judged, but it does have a strange confounding power of its own." He went on: "The Refuge is a monument to both the sophistication and the isolation of Australia during the early 1950s. It is an unwieldy book, self-indulgent in its articulation, by a writer of genius slumming it in a popular mode. It is, in various ways, corrupted by both the pretentiousness of its burbling arabesques of style and opinionation and by the vulgarity of the form with flashiness working to adorn a trashiness that lacks any principle of economy. However, The Refuge is also a stunning enactment of its central idea."

In Kirkus Reviews the reviewer was not overly impressed: "Mackenzie is contrasting the literal and figurative isolation of Australia with the turmoil that had already touched the rest of the world. He seems to have intended to write a thriller saturated in the particularly noir mixture of longing, regret, and obsessiveness. Those elements, along with any tension, are lost in the thickets of more than 400 pages, which feel too much like a philosophical inquiry."
