= The Sponge Divers =

1955 novel by Charmian Clift and George Johnston

- Author: Charmian Clift and George Johnston
- Language: English
- Genre: Literary fiction
- Publisher: Collins
- Publication date: 1955
- Publication place: Australia
- Media type: Print
- Pages: 318 pp
- Preceded by: The Big Chariot
- Followed by: Walk to the Paradise Gardens, The Darkness Outside

The Sponge Divers (1955) is a novel by Australian authors Charmian Clift and George Johnston. The novel was also published in the USA under the title The Sea and the Stone.

== Plot outline ==
The novel is centred around the Greek island of Kalymnos where, for thousands of years, the locals have put out to sea to dive for sponges. But now a chemist has developed a synthetic substitute and the locals must learn to deal with the consequences of that discovery.

== Critical reception ==
Don Edwards, reviewing the novel in The Sydney Morning Herald, found that the authors "have an exotic setting that gives them opportunities for the descriptive writing they favour." And "Ultimately, the strength of their achievement lies in their creation of background."

A reviewer in The Bulletin was not impressed with the novel: "In general the imagery is laid on too thickly, the rhythms too obvious, the manner too portentous. Passages of colorful prose follow one another in such quick succession that the reader is first dazzled and then benumbed. The book seeks to deal with the fundamentals, the simplicities of life. A less decorative style would have served it better."

== See also ==
- 1955 in Australian literature
