= The Wandering Islands =

Book by A. D. Hope

- Author: A. D. Hope
- Language: English
- Genre: poetry
- Publisher: Edwards and Shaw, Sydney
- Publication date: 1955
- Publication place: Australia
- Media type: Print
- Pages: 73pp

The Wandering Islands (1955) is the first poetry collection by Australian poet A. D. Hope. It won the Grace Leven Prize for Poetry in 1955.

The collection consists of 39 poems, most are published in this collection for the first time and others are reprinted from various Australian poetry publications. The earliest poem in the collection dates from 1943.

== Contents ==
- "Australia"
- "Flower Poem"
- "Easter Hymn"
- "Observation Car"
- "The Wandering Islands"
- "Three Romances"
- "Rawhead and Bloody Bones"
- "X-Ray Photograph"
- "Massacre of the Innocents"
- "Pygmalion"
- "Ascent into Hell"
- "The Gateway"
- "The Muse"
- "The Pleasure of Princes"
- "Imperial Adam"
- "The Trophy"
- "Pyramis or The House of Ascent"
- "Circe : After the Painting by Dosso Dossi"
- "The Death of the Bird"
- "Invocation"
- "William Butler Yeats"
- "Chorale"
- "The Cheek"
- "The Sleeper"
- "Lot and His Daughters" Note: Printed as two separate poems: "Lot and His Daughters" I and II.
- "The Dinner"
- "The Return of Persephone"
- "The Lamp and the Jar"
- "Heldensagen"
- "The Brides"
- "Toast for a Golden Age"
- "Sportsfield"
- "Standardisation"
- "Giving It Up"
- "The House of God"
- "The Lingam and the Yoni"
- "To Julia Walking Away"
- "The Explorers"
- "Conquistador"
- "The Bed"

== See also ==
- 1955 in Australian literature
- 1955 in poetry

== Notes ==
"He was talked into publishing his first book in 1956 when two young printers who had inherited a printing press wrote and told him of some fine paper they had acquired. They would print a book if he would provide the manuscript. He did and The Wandering Islands was born."

The full text of the collection is available on the Poetry Library website.

== Critical reception ==
In a retrospective of A. D. Hope's work originally published in The Times Literary Supplement, Clive James wrote: "The first collection of poems by A.D. Hope, The Wandering Islands, belatedly appeared in 1955, and consolidated the position he had already established as the leading Australian poet of his time. The book had to appear belatedly (Hope was already 48) because if it had appeared much earlier its author might have been prosecuted. Australia was still a censored country and several of Hope's poems dared to mention the particularities of sexual intercourse. Without his air of authority, Hope might never have got his book into the shops before old age supervened. But an air of authority was what he had. He spoke from on high. His vocabulary was of the present, but it had the past in it, transparent a long way down. And it was all sent forward like a wave by his magisterial sense of rhythm."

== Awards ==
- 1955 - winner Grace Leven Prize for Poetry
