= The Two Fires (poem) =

1954 poem by Australian poet Judith Wright

- by Judith Wright
- Original title: "Two Fires"
- Written: 1954
- First published in: Ern Malley's Journal
- Country: Australia
- Language: English
- Publication date: November 1954
- Lines: 44

"The Two Fires" (1954) is a poem by Australian poet Judith Wright, also known under the title "Two Fires".

It was originally published in Ern Malley's Journal in November 1954, and was subsequently reprinted in the author's single-author collections and a number of Australian poetry anthologies.

== Synopsis ==
The poet writes of a world that is under the threat of all-consuming nuclear war. She notes that "In the beginning was the fire", a fire that created our world. And now we stand facing another fire, one that will destroy it all.

== Critical reception ==
In her review of The Two Fires collection in The Age Greeba Jamison called the poem "finely wrought", that spoke "with depth and passion the thought of this age, in which the threat of destruction is the background to living."

The Oxford Companion to Australian Literature states, in a commentary on the poet's collection of the same title, that the poem was written at the time of the Korean War and sees "mankind threatened by nuclear holocaust." It goes on: "The poem reflects the uncertainty that worried people as they witnessed the brinksmanship of statesmen prepared to run unimaginable risks to achieve their objectives."

== Publication history ==
After the poem's initial publication in Ern Malley's Journal it was reprinted as follows:

- The Two Fires by Judith Wright, Angus and Robertson, 1955
- Five Senses: Selected Poems by Judith Wright, Angus and Robertson, 1963
- Judith Wright : Collected Poems, 1942-1970 by Judith Wright, Angus and Robertson, 1971
- A Human Pattern : Selected Poems by Judith Wright, Angus and Robertson, 1990
- Collected Poems 1942-1985 by Judith Wright, Angus and Robertson, 1994
- Macquarie PEN Anthology of Australian Literature edited by Nicholas Jose, Kerryn Goldsworthy, Anita Heiss, David McCooey, Peter Minter, Nicole Moore, and Elizabeth Webby, Allen and Unwin, 2009

== See also ==
- 1954 in Australian literature
- 1954 in poetry
