= 1884 in Australian literature =

This article presents a list of the historical events and publications of Australian literature during 1884.

== Events ==
- January — the publishing house of Angus and Robertson is created when George Robertson joined David Mackenzie Angus in partnership.

== Books ==
- Rolf Boldrewood — Plain Living: A Bush Idyll
- Ada Cambridge — A Marriage Ceremony
- B. L. Farjeon — The Sacred Nugget
- Rosa Praed — Zero : A Story of Monte Carlo

== Poetry ==
- Francis Adams — Henry and Other Tales
- Marcus Clarke
  - "In a Lady's Album"
  - "The Eight Hours' Anniversary"
  - "The Wail of the Waiter : A Tavern Catch"
- Mary Hannay Foott — "The Australiad : An Epic for Young Australians"
- William Sharp
  - "Mid-Noon in January"
  - "Morning in the Bush (December)"
  - "The Stock-Driver's Ride"
- J. Brunton Stephens — "Drought and Doctrine"

== Short stories ==
- Marcus Clarke
  - "Hunted Down"
  - "An Up-Country Toewnship"

== Non-fiction ==
- Daniel Henry Deniehy — The Life and Speeches of Daniel Henry Deniehy

== Births ==
A list, ordered by date of birth (and, if the date is either unspecified or repeated, ordered alphabetically by surname) of births in 1884 of Australian literary figures, authors of written works or literature-related individuals follows, including year of death.

- 18 March — Bernard Cronin, novelist (died 1968)
- 13 October — Jack McLaren, novelist (died 1954)
- 22 December — Bartlett Adamson, journalist, poet, writer and political activist (died 1951)

== Deaths ==
A list, ordered by date of death (and, if the date is either unspecified or repeated, ordered alphabetically by surname) of deaths in 1884 of Australian literary figures, authors of written works or literature-related individuals follows, including year of birth.

- 13 March — Richard Henry Horne, poet (born 1802)

== See also ==
- 1884 in Australia
- 1884 in literature
- 1884 in poetry
- List of years in Australian literature
- List of years in literature
