= Thirty Poems =

1954 Australian poetry collection by John Thompson

- Author: John Thompson
- Language: English
- Genre: Poetry collection
- Publisher: Edwards and Shaw
- Publication date: 1954
- Publication place: Australia
- Media type: Print
- Pages: 54 pp
- Awards: 1954 Grace Leven Prize for Poetry, winner

Thirty Poems is a collection of poems by Australian poet John Thompson, published by Edwards and Shaw in 1954.

The collection contains 30 poems reprinted from a number of sources and with some being published here for the first time.

It was the winner of the 1954 Grace Leven Prize for Poetry.

== Contents ==
- "Letter to a Friend"
- "Three Dawns Ago"
- "When Forty Summers"
- "I Watched Old Learning"
- "Married Quarrel"
- "A Testament"
- "Noises in the Afternoon"
- "The Conqueror"
- "The Escape"
- "Workers"
- "The Adventurers"
- "Whalers"
- "A Man Baffled"
- "The City"
- "Transcontinental"
- "The Half-Alive"
- "Prologue for a Broadcast"
- "The Sunbather"
- "Industrial Rhapsody"
- "The Traveller"
- "The Wife do Talk – Dorset, 1935"
- "Winter Words – Dorset, 1935"
- "Farm Hand do Talk – Dorset, 1935"
- "Meditation on a Scene – Dorset, 1936"
- "Awakening"
- "Moods and Whimsies 1"
- "Moods and Whimsies 2"
- "Moods and Whimsies 3"
- "Moods and Whimsies 4"
- "Moods and Whimsies 5"

== Critical reception ==
Reviewing the collection for The Sydney Morning Herald poet and critic A. D. Hope noted that the poet was also a radio announcer and commented: "The poet who writes poetry, as John Thompson often does, for radio transmission, must be a poet able to talk for his audience and not at them. Mr. Thompson has perfected this art. When he talks to himself in verse it is with the easy and charming and interesting tone of voice in which we would all like to think that we talk."

A review in The Bulletin noted some weaknesses in the poems about "the bush" and "social justice for mankind", going on to explain that the poet was trying "for sociological reasons, to write with more intensity than was natural to him, making propaganda instead of poetry." The newer poems in the book were considered "lighter", and it is in "their lightness that Mr. Thompson seems to have found, after many explorations, both poetry and himself."

== Notes ==
- Dedication: For Patricia
- Author's note: The great majority of poems in this book have not been collected before. Many are now printed for the first time. Several are reprinted from an earlier book, Three Dawns Ago, which was never distributed in Australia. A few poems are reprinted from Sesame, among them "The Traveller," which has been slightly revised and is now given in its final form.

== See also ==
- 1954 in Australian literature
