= The Young Desire It =

1937 novel by Kenneth Mackenzie

- 1963 edition
- Author: Seaforth Mackenzie
- Language: English
- Publisher: Jonathan Cape, London
- Publication date: 1937
- Publication place: Australia
- Media type: Print hardback & paperback
- Pages: 330
- Followed by: Chosen People

The Young Desire It (1937) is a novel by Australian author Seaforth Mackenzie. It won the ALS Gold Medal for Best Novel in 1937.

== Plot summary ==
The novel details a year in the life of its teenage protagonist Charles Fox. He has left his idyllic life on an isolated Western Australian farm for boarding school. There he suffers the bullying of his fellow students, uncomfortable advances from his schoolmaster and a difficult scholastic workload.

== Notes ==
- Dedication: To W.G.C.
- Epigraph: "...To be free to choose is not enough. Though the young desire it, they cannot use that freedom, but must be forced into the decision of choice by good or evil circumstances which while they can perceive them they cannot control..." (Michael Paul: The Anatomy of Failure).
- In his foreword to the novel, first included in the 1963 edition, Douglas Stewart says: "Mackenzie told me that he had invented the author, "Michael Paul", and the quotation from Michael Paul's alleged writings from which he had taken his title. He was always amused that none of his critics had spotted this harmless little hoax..."

== Reviews ==
- Writing at the time of the book's original publication, a reviewer in Brisbane's Sunday Mail wrote: "Writing of rare fineness and delicacy immediately is apparent in this, the first novel of a young Australian...The Young Desire It defies brief description. With all the fine perceptions of the author, the novel is baffling, unsatisfying, vague, yet stamped with a certain genius that might, with more manageable material, produce a memorable work."
- The novel was reprinted in 2013 as a part of the Text Publishing Text Classics series. Alex Cothren reviewed this edition for Transnational Literature: "These are the bare bones of a coming-of-age narrative, but from them Mackenzie fashions a wholly muscular, hot-blooded portrait of a young man; a psychological profile so precise that every shift in Charles' mood carries the tension of a thriller. It is amongst the best written in the genre, a true Australian classic whose power has not diminished over the generations."

== Awards and nominations ==
- 1937 winner ALS Gold Medal

== Editions ==
- The First edition was published by Cape in 1937.
- Re-print with Angus and Robertson in 1963
- 2013 a new re-set edition was published by Text with an introduction entitled "A Perilous Tension" by David Malouf
