= The Two Fires =

1955 poetry collection by Judith Wright

- Author: Judith Wright
- Language: English
- Genre: Poetry collection
- Publisher: Angus and Robertson
- Publication date: 1955
- Publication place: Australia
- Media type: Print
- Pages: 51 pp.

The Two Fires is a collection of poems by Australian poet Judith Wright, published by Angus and Robertson in 1955.

The collection contains 45 poems, from a number of sources. Some were published here for the first time.

== Contents ==
- "The Two Fires"
- "The Precipice"
- "Silence"
- "Return"
- "West Wind"
- "Western Star"
- "Two Generations"
- "Searchlight Practice"
- "For the Loved and the Unloved"
- "Dialogue"
- "The Man Beneath the Tree"
- "Cyclone and Aftermath"
- "For Precision"
- "Nameless Flower"
- "Breath"
- "Scribbly-Gum"
- "Black Shouldered Kite"
- "Flying-Fox on Barbed Wire"
- "Gum Trees Stripping"
- Seven Songs from a Journey, poetry sequence
  - "Carnarvon Range"
  - "Brigalow Country"
  - "Night"
  - "The Prospector"
  - "Canefields"
  - "Seabeach (Sea-beach)"
  - "Mount Mary"
- "Sanctuary"
- "At Cooloolah"
- "Landscapes"
- "The Wattle Tree"
- "...And Mr Ferritt"
- Flesh, poetry sequence
  - "The Hand"
  - "The Body"
  - "The Face"
- "The Cup"
- "Two Old Men : I"
- "An Old Man (Two Old Men : II)"
- "To a Child Outside Time"
- "For a Birthday"
- "In Praise of Marriages"
- "Request to a Year"
- "Storm"
- "Song"
- "Wildflower Plain"
- "The Harp and the King"

== Critical reception ==
In the Bulletin a reviewer was of the opinion that Wright's "is the largely-unconscious artistry of a born poet; and, loose though some of the travel-poems are and repetitive as are some of her themes, moods and devices (but what poet ever escaped repetition, having beaten-out a style and marked-out a world?), it is enough to say of The Two Fires that it contains six or maybe a dozen poems of the rare quality we have come to expect–deep, rich, compassionate and hauntingly beautiful."

The Oxford Companion to Australian Literature states that, with the collection being published during the time of the Korean war, the title poem sees "mankind threatened by nuclear holocaust." They go on to note that a number of poems here "show man baffled in his painstaking search for things that should come effortlessly, e.g. love and truth".

== See also ==
- 1955 in Australian literature

== Notes ==
- Epigraph: 'This world, which is the same for all, no one of gods or men has made; but it was ever, is now, and ever shall be an ever-living Fire, with measures of its kindling, and measures going out.' -Herakleitos (Frag. 20, ed. Bywater) Burnet, Early Greek Philosophy, p. 134.
