= Dina Nath Walli =

Indian water colour artist and poet

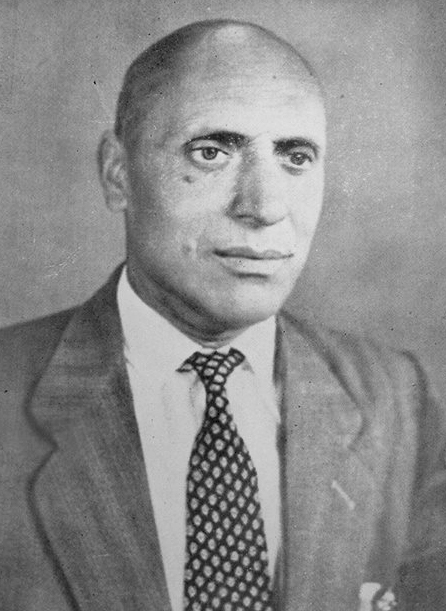
- Watercolor Artist
- Born: 1908; Srinagar, J&K, British India
- Died: 2006 (aged 97–98); Karnal, Haryana, India
- Known for: Painting and poetry
- Movement: Modern art
- Awards: Maharaja Gold Medal (1939), Highly commended medal, Academy of Fine Arts Calcutta (1940), AIFACS Veteran Artist Award (1996), Saraswati Samman (2004)

Dina Nath Walli (1908–2006), also known by his pen name Almast Kashmiri, was an Indian water colour artist and poet from Srinagar, Kashmir. He was the part of the modern art movement in the erstwhile Indian state of Jammu and Kashmir, and was known for painting everyday scenes of Kashmir.

== Early life and education ==
Dina Nath Walli was born in 1906 in the Badyar Bala neighborhood of Srinagar, in the Kashmir Valley of the then princely state of Jammu and Kashmir, within British India, into a Kashmiri Pandit family. His father died when Dina Nath was very young. He had his early education in Srinagar, then he continued his three years course at Amar Singh Technical Institute, Srinagar and then he moved from Kashmir to Calcutta in Bengal Presidency in 1930 for his further training, where he learned various forms of art under the guidance of Percy Brown, principal of the Government College of Art & Craft at the University of Calcutta.

== Career ==
In 1936, he returned to Srinagar, where he concentrated on landscape painting in water colours. He was also awarded gold medals by the government of Kashmir in 1939 and in 1940 he was awarded a highly commended medal from the Academy of Fine Arts, Calcutta. He had also produced an album of 12 paintings.

Under his pen name of Almast Kashmiri, his "accent on realistic art or people's poetry", is best seen in his two collections of his poetry, Bala Yapair (This side of Mountains, 1955) and Sahaavukh Posh (Desert Flowers, 1981).

== Works ==
- Kashmir Water Colour Paintings, by Dinanath Walli. Walli, 1970.
- Sahraavuky posh: desert flowers, by Dinanath Walli. Metropolitan Book Co., 1978.
