= The Viking of Van Diemen's Land =

1954 book

The Viking of Van Diemen's Land: the stormy life of Jorgen Jorgensen
- Title page for The Viking of Van Diemen's Land: the stormy life of Jorgen Jorgensen (1954)
- Author: Frank Clune; P. R. Stephensen
- Language: English
- Subject: Jørgen Jørgensen
- Genre: historical biography
- Publisher: Angus and Robertson
- Publication date: 1954
- Publication place: Australia

The Viking of Van Diemen's Land: the stormy life of Jorgen Jorgensen is a 1954 Australian book by Frank Clune and P. R. Stephensen about Jørgen Jørgensen.

== History ==
The book was originally written by P.R. Stephensen after extensive research; he was paid £1,000 for the job by Frank Clune. The original manuscript ran to 400,000 words. Angus and Robertson refused to publish it until it was cut down and Frank Clune did the work. Stephensen was unhappy with the result.

According to Clune's entry in the Australian Dictionary of Biography the book "was thought to have more in common with historical novels than history; Clune and... Stephensen were taken to task for passing off conjecture as fact in the life of Jorgen Jorgenson. The book had come from notes which Clune had made over eighteen years and from the work of researchers employed on contract, and was written up in a dramatic manner. With its impressive bibliography, it illustrates Clune's strengths and weaknesses: an ability to ferret out information, but a desire to embroider it."

== Reception ==
The Newcastle Herald said "Clune and Stephensen seem too ready to excuse Jorgensen many of his faults, but altogether they have written a fascinating book about a fascinating person."

The Herald said "The book is written In a much more lucid and graceful style than one usually associates with Mr Clune."

The Daily Mirror said the authors "seem to have a gift for history rather than literature and have managed to write an uninteresting book about a most interesting personality."

Stephenson defended the book against critics.
