= Charlotte Jay =

Australian writer

- Born: Geraldine Mary Jay; 17 December 1919; Adelaide, South Australia, Australia
- Died: 26 October 1996 (aged 76); Adelaide, South Australia, Australia
- Occupation: Writer
- Writing career
- Notable work: Beat Not the Bones

Geraldine Halls (17 December 1919 – 26 October 1996) was an Australian mystery writer and novelist who sometimes wrote under the pseudonym Charlotte Jay, Jay being Halls's maiden name. Halls' book Beat Not the Bones won the then newly created Edgar Allan Poe Award of the Mystery Writers' Association of America for Best Novel of the Year in 1954. The crime novel, The Fugitive Eye was adapted for television for a drama series in 1961. The episode starred Charlton Heston and the series was hosted by Fred Astaire.

== Life ==
Halls was born as Geraldine Mary Jay in Adelaide, South Australia on 17 December 1919. She attended Girton School (now Pembroke School) and the University of Adelaide, and worked as a shorthand typist in Australia and England, and as a court stenographer in New Guinea, 1942–1950.

She married Albert Halls, an Oriental specialist, who worked with the United Nations Educational, Scientific and Cultural Organization (UNESCO). Albert Halls dealt in Oriental antiques in England and Australia. Marrying Albert enabled Halls to travel to many exotic locations in which she later included in her books. Only her first novel, The Knife is Feminine, is set in Australia. The other books are set in Pakistan, Japan, Thailand, England, Lebanon, India, Papua New Guinea and the Trobriand Islands.

After a long career in writing, Halls died on 26 October 1996, in her home town of Adelaide.

== Works ==
=== Charlotte Jay novels ===
- The Knife Is Feminine (1951)
- Beat Not the Bones (1952)
- The Fugitive Eye (1953)
- The Yellow Turban (1955)
- The Man Who Walked Away (US Title: The Stepfather) (1958)
- Arms for Adonis (1960)
- A Hank of Hair (1964)

=== Geraldine Mary Jay novels ===
- The Feast of the Dead (US Title: The Brink of Silence) (1956)

=== Geraldine Halls novels ===
- The Cats of Benares (1967)
- Cobra Kite (1971)
- The Voice of the Crab (1974)
- The Last Summer of the Men Shortage (1977)
- The Felling of Thawle : a novel (1979)
- Talking to strangers : a novel (1982)
- This is My Friend's Chair (1995)
