= The Kelly Hunters =

1954 book by Frank Clune

- Author: Frank Clune
- Language: English
- Genre: Non-fiction
- Publisher: Angus and Robertson
- Publication date: 1954
- Publication place: Australia
- Media type: Print
- Pages: 362 pp.

The Kelly Hunters is a 1954 Australian book by Frank Clune about the hunt for bushranger Ned Kelly.

The book sold very well.

The Sun-Herald said "Indefatigable researcher and skilled storyteller, Clune presents Ned Kelly neither as the persecuted hero of one legend nor the bloodthirsty ruffian of another, but as an intelligible and highly intelligent human being."

The Sydney Morning Herald said "the main points of the Kelly story have been brought out more clearly than ever before."

The Advertiser said "All this is good, robust stuff, bright and bustling history well seasoned with drama and a touch of moralising. Clune, in fact, has made of the Kelly story a picturesque novel grafted with the sombre inevitability of a Greek tragedy. As history, it must have some value, and as an epic yarn it has a great deal."

The Bulletin called it "by far the fullest account of the Kellys yet published, fascinating if poorly written in its detail, and contains a mass of rough-and-ready research... But it is too obviously and naively partisan to be accepted anywhere as reliable."

Clune adapted his book into 1962's Ned Kelly's Last Stand and 1981's Frank Clune's Ned Kelly.
