= James Workman (writer) =

Australian actor and writer

James Workman (4 February 1912 – 28 March 2001) was a Scottish-born actor and writer who mostly worked in Australia.

== Biography ==
=== Early life ===
Workman was born in Scotland in Cove House, Ecclefechan in 1912. In 1914 his family moved to London and he attended a convent school. Workman left school relatively early and attended HMS Conway, a school ship which trained people for the merchant navy. He worked as a sailor for four years on ships such as The City of Exeter and various freighters. Workman then became a policeman in London and started acting in plays in his spare time. He left the police force when he was twenty-five. He wrote novels in England.

=== Africa ===
Workman moved to South Africa, originally intending to becoming a miner at Benoni, but these plans were thwarted when he realised his lung capacity did not allow him to work underground. He moved to Lourenço Marques in Portuguese East Africa, where he worked for an English-language radio station, announcing and writing scripts, including five-minute serials. He also lived in Rhodesia.

During the war Workman enlisted with the Witwatersrand Rifles and served with the Eighth Army. After his war service Workman toured Africa in shows with Gwen Ffrangcon-Davies. He worked for the South African Broadcasting Commission as an announcer, scriptwriter and producer, writing some serials.

=== Australia ===
Workman moved to Australia in 1948 for his wife's health. He worked as an actor at first, mostly on stage, but also on radio. He began writing on radio for Gordon Grimsdale when Grimsdale expressed his frustration getting writers for the series Thirty Minutes to Go; Workman became one of its leading writers.

In 1957-58 Workman lived in London for 18 months, after which he returned to Australia. When television came to Australia, the market for commercial radio plays went into decline. Workman focused on novels instead writing 23 in all. He continued to write for radio and did some scripts for television, including the revue Press Gang (1959) and the play Reflections in Dark Glasses.

Workman died on 28 March 2001, at the age of 89.

== Appraisal ==
A 1955 article called Workman "One of the finest [radio] scripters in the game, a writer with a hatred of the obvious, a constant seeker after new ideas."

Radio historian Jacqueline Kent wrote "His scripts were innovative and, some thought, difficult to produce and act. At a time when most writers let each character say something definite, followed by a speech from another character, Workman’s scripts used parallel conversations... James Workman was writing Pinteresque dialogue long before Harold Pinter; in Australian radio his technique was way ahead of its time."

Workman considered himself a "commercial writer" more at home working for the commercial networks than the ABC.

== Films ==
- Into the Straight (1948) - actor
- Strong is the Seed (1949) - actor

== Television ==
- ITV Television Playhouse - "2000 Minus 60" (1958) - TV play - writer
- Press Gang (1959) - TV revue - writer, performer
- Reflections in Dark Glasses (1960) – TV play - writer
- Armchair Theatre - "Cold Fury" (1960)
- In Writing (1961) – actor
- Alfred Hitchcock Presents - "Apex" (1962) - writer
- Malibu Playhouse - "Finger on the Pulse" (1963) - writer
- Contrabandits - episodes "Target, Smokehouse" (1967) - writer (this script won AWGIE award)
- Motel (1967) – writer
- Skippy the Bush Kangaroo – writer
- The Long Arm (1970) – writer
- Behind the Legend (1973-74) - episodes "Melba", "Charles Ulm", "C.Y. O'Connor", "Ray Parer" - writer
- Number 96 - writer
- Class of '74 - writer
- The Tichborne Affair (1977) – writer

== Novels ==
- The Apologetic Tiger (Hodder & Stoughton, 1958)
- Lucifer at Ponsfordville (Hodder & Stoughton, 1959)
- Face of Fortune (Hodder & Stoughton, 1961)
- Impact (Horwitz, 1962) (as "James Dark")
- The Mad Surgeon (Horwitz, 1962) (as "Victor Kain")
- The Captain from Goondiwindi (Horwitz, 1962)
- Havoc! (Horwitz, 1962) (as "James Dark")
- Sweet Taste of Venom (Horwitz, 1963) (as "James Dark")
- Cleopatra of Egypt (Horwitz, 1963)
- The Navy's Here (Horwitz, 1963)
- Sodom and Gomorrah (Horwitz, 1963)
- The Witch Hunters (Horwitz, 1963)
- The Spy from the Grave (Horwitz, 1964) (as "James Dark")
- Sin in Hong Kong (1965)
- Dragon Ships (Horwitz, 1965)
- Genghis Khan (Horwitz, 1965)
- Sin in Hong Kong (Horwitz, 1965)
- Charge of the Light Brigade (Horwitz, 1966)
- The Mad Emperor (Scripts, 1966)
- Sex and the Soviet Spy (Horwitz, 1966)
- Attila the Hun (Scripts, 1967)
- The Courtesans (Scripts, 1967)
- Zenobia, Empress of Lust (Scripts, 1967)
- The Beautiful Beast of Buchenwald (Scripts 1968)
- Shark Bait (Horwitz, 1968) - based on script for Contrabandits

=== Short story collections ===
- Shock Stories (Horwitz 1962) - "The Castaway", "The Dead Man’s Heart", "The Fungus and the Flower", "Possession", "The Spell", "Spindrift", "Trade-in Bodies"
- Terrifying Stories (Horwitz, 1962) (as "James Dark") - "Dead on Time", "Dogged", "The Flying Fix", "Hanging On", "Mad to Start", "Shadow Men", "A Small Grave Matter"
- Horror Tales (Horwitz, 1963) (as "James Dark") - "The Creep", "Fattened Calf", "The Flare", "The Flashing Scar", "Man on the Run", "Perkins the Pilot"

=== Other short stories ===
- The Reluctant Shadow (1958)
- "Apex" in London Mystery Selection #36, March 1958
- "The Mummy’s Curse" in Nightmare Stories ed. Charles Higham (Horwitz, 1962)

== Radio ==
=== As actor ===
- Murder at the Seventh (1948)
- From These Ashes (1949)
- Blue Hills (1949)
- Close Shaves in History (1950)
- Gimme the Boats (1954) - actor

=== As writer ===
- Thirty Minutes to Go (1954) - various episodes
- Fares Please (1951)
- There's Nothing New (serial)
- The Last Miracle (1953)
- The Legend of Blue Nose Rock (Sept 1953)
- Personal Effects (1954)
- Rhthym of Life (1954)
- Mirror Mirror on the Wall (1954)
- L'innoue The innocent (1954)
- This is My Play (1954)
- This is My Play (1954) "The Jackpot"
- The Tin Hook (1954)
- Heartbeat (1955) - also actor
- A Moment of Peril (1956)
- The Big Squeeze (1956) - series - also director
- Deadline (1957) - series - also director
- The Key (1958) - series
- Call Box (1959)
- Ben Hur (1959) (serial)
- Solo Performance (1959)
- Street of Secrets (serial)
- The Thirsty World (1960) (science series)
- The Apologetic Tiger (1960) (serial) - adapted from his novel
- Cold Fury (1961) (play) - adapted from his stage play Eternal Night
- Countdown (1960) (serial)
- Timber Ridge
- Odette
- For the Young in Heart (1972) (serial)
- The Old Poisoner (1973)

== Documentary ==
- Facing Facts - writer

== Stage ==
- Love for Love (1948) - actor
- The Circle (1948) - actor
- Midsummer Nights Dream (1948) - actor
- various plays as actor for the Globe Player in Sydney in 1949
- Duet for Two Hands (1949) - actor, producer
- Macbeth (1949) - actor
- Private Lives (1949) - actor
- Where's Charley? (1950) - actor
- various productions as actor for John Alden Company in 1951-1952 including Hamlet (1951), Midsummer Night's Dream King Lear, The Merry Wives of Windsor
- Why Not Tonight? (1951) - actor
- Eternal Night (1954) - writer
- Hamlet (1954) - actor
- The Love of Four Colonels (1955) - actor
- People of Nowhere (1960) - actor
- The Merchant of Venice (1961) - actor
- The Grotto (1962) - actor
- The Passion Play actor (1963)
- Assault with a Deadly Weapon (1972) - actor
- See you at Philippi (1973) - writer
- Breadfruit for breakfast [manuscript] : a play in two acts - writer
- Possession [manuscript] : a play in one act / - writer
- Cold Cure - writer
- Brain drain [manuscript] : a play in one act - writer
- Shut-up and Strip [manuscript] : a play in one act - writer
