= Beat Not the Bones =

1952 novel by Charlotte Jay

- First edition (publ. Harper & Brothers)
- Author: Charlotte Jay
- Language: English
- Publisher: Collins
- Publication date: 1952
- Publication place: Australia

Beat Not the Bones is a 1952 suspense novel (and psychological thriller) by Charlotte Jay (pseudonym of Geraldine Halls) which won the inaugural Edgar award for best novel.

The novel follows the actions of a sheltered young women who arrives in New Guinea from Australia, determined to find out what really happened to her husband, the Chief Anthropologist in the colonial administration. His death has been ascribed to suicide but she has reason to believe it was murder.

The novel was praised for its buildup of suspense and for its novel setting.

The novel was reissued in 1992 by Wakefield Press as part of a series reviving Australian crime classics, with an afterword by the editors. They make two further claims for the book. Firstly, it is one of very few historical descriptions of New Guinea, in this case in the immediate post war period. Secondly, they describe it as an ‘’early, a-typical example of an anti-colonial novel’’, and point out its resemblance to Joseph Conrad's Heart of Darkness.

Awards
| Preceded by (none) | Edgar Allan Poe Award for Best Novel; 1954 | Succeeded by The Long Goodbye by Raymond Chandler |
