= Overland Telegraph (book) =

1955 book by Frank Clune

- Author: Frank Clune
- Language: English
- Genre: history
- Publication date: 1955
- Publication place: Australia

Overland Telegraph is a 1955 Australian book by Frank Clune about the construction of the Overland Telegraph. It is one of Clune's best known works.

The Sydney Morning Herald called it "one of Mr Clune's best books" although he felt "the actual building of the O.T. becomes rather tedious in print and he must have realised it when he got into his book."

The Daily Telegraph called it "one of Clune's better books".

The Bulletin said the book was "so closely fastened to a piece of our essential folklore that one cannot but welcome it, cannot but recommend it—and cannot but wish it were infinitely better."

== Background ==
In 1939 it was announced Clune had written a script called Overland Telegraph which he had sold to Cinesound Productions. The story focused on Sir Charles Todd and his team who had to construct the telegraph. It was to be "Australia's first epic film". However Cinesound soon stopped feature filmmaking due to the war and no movie resulted. Clune later turned the material into a book.
