= Eternal Night =

1954 Australian play

- Original language: English
- Written by: James Workman
- Characters: Donkin; Aaronson; Mattie
- Subject: Antarctica
- Genre: melodrama
- Setting: Antactica

Premiere
- Date: July 22, 1954
- Place: Independent Theatre, Sydney
- Directed by: Gordon Grimsdale

SMH advertisement 23 July 1954 p 16

Eternal Night is a 1954 Australian play by James Workman. The original production was directed by Gordon Grimsdale who had directed Workman's scripts on radio for the thriller series Thirty Minutes to Go.

It was adapted for British TV as Cold Fury.

== Premise ==
"An imaginary weather station on Maundy Island in the Antarctic is the setting... The cast consists of three men — Donkin (Barrie Cookson) and Aaronson (Gordon Glen wright), weather observers, and a paranoiac, illiterate roustabout Matty (Ron Whelan). Matty, though ignorant, is physically stronger than the two weather observers. When his drunkenness is blamed for the party not being able to board the relief ship for Melbourne, his insanity and class hatred combine to make him a murderer. He kills Aaronson by cunningly fixing a fuel stove, then he decides to rule the weather station. He insists Donkin call him God."

== Original cast ==
- Ron Whelan as Mattie
- Gordon Glenwright as Aaronson
- Barrie Cookson as Donkin

== Production history ==
James Workman said, "My play shows just what happens, and just what is said, as the three men break down under the strain of being shut up together. I haven't pulled any punches — in the dialogue or otherwise — to achieve complete realism. The play will definitely make audiences sit up."

The play was scheduled to open on 15 July 1954 at the Independent Theatre in Sydney. It would be that theatre's 25th Australian play. The opening was postponed due to the illness of one of the cast.

== Reception ==
The Sydney Daily Telegraph wrote that Workman had "pulled no punches in providing a brutal plot and the play's three equally violent characters. But Mr. Workman is by profession a radio writer, well known for his action-packed suspense thrillers. To some extent, he has unwisely used much of his radio technique in this stage production."

The Sydney Morning Herald called the play "shrill, raw, and vehement, overstated and overlong, unhelped by the absence of relaxed and gentle moods, so that the unrelenting violence of the wrangling becomes a little palting at times - but, for all that, Mr Workman keeps shrewd control of his suspense, and draws three very formidable characters despite the way all of them occasionally lapse into uncharacteristic talk."

The Daily Mirror felt the play "was weighted down with action and violence, and the dialogue rarely got above the level of the average radio commercial serial."

The Bulletin called the play "a first-rate opportunity for tight-as-a-drumhead drama, and the cast... go at it hammer-and-tongues."

== Cold Fury - television adaptation ==
"Eternal Night"
- Armchair Theatre episode
- Episode no.: Season 3 Episode 73
- Directed by: Dennis Vance
- Written by: James Workman
- Based on: play Eternal Night by James Workman
- Original air date: January 31, 1960
- Running time: 60 mins

Guest appearances
- Sam Wanamaker as Matty; Bernard Lee as Aaronson; Lyndon Brook as Donkin

The play was adapted for British television as Cold Fury

=== Reception ===
The Liverpool Daily Post said it "gripped the attention but did not add up to anything satisfactory. Wannamaker gave a rip roaring performance."

"Must be British television's first Grand Guignol," wrote the Daily Telegraph, adding "certainly strong nerves were required to sit it out." The Birmingham Evening Mail thought it was "dreary". The Runcorn Guardian declared "the dialogue was slightly above average and Sam Wannamaker gave a touching performance."

== Radio ==
The play was adapted for Australian radio as Cold Fury in 1961.
