= Frank Clune =

Australian historian and writer

Francis Patrick Clune OBE
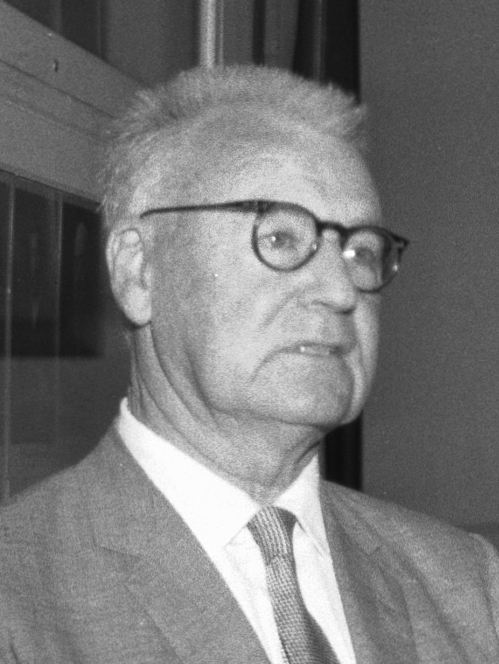
- Born: Francis Patrick Clune; 27 November 1893; Darlinghurst, New South Wales, Australia
- Died: 11 March 1971 (aged 77); Sydney, New South Wales, Australia
- Occupations: Author, travel writer and popular historian

Francis Patrick Clune, OBE, (27 November 1893 – 11 March 1971) was an Australian writer and historian.

== Early life and career ==
Clune was born in Liverpool Street, Darlinghurst, Sydney in 1893, and grew up in Redfern. He left home at 15 and claimed to have had twenty-five different jobs by the age of 17. He enlisted with the US Army in Kansas 26 October 1911, deserting and going to sea.

Clune joined the First Australian Imperial Force (AIF) in 1915 during World War I and was soon with the 16th Battalion at Gallipoli. He was wounded in action and repatriated a year after being wounded in both legs.

He married Maud Roy in 1916; they divorced in 1920. He married again in 1923 to artist and sculptor Thelma Cecily Smith (1900–1992), established himself as a tax consultant and by 1930 had settled in Vaucluse. His first book was published in 1933, Try Anything Once, an account of his adventures. Some of his subsequent books were written in collaboration with P. R. 'Inky' Stephensen, notably The Viking of Van Diemen's Land and The Pirates of the Brig 'Cyprus'.

He was fascinated by the 'outsiders' of Australian history such as Captain Melville, Captain Starlight, Martin Cash, Edward Hargraves, Bully Hayes, Jørgen Jørgensen, "Chinese" Morrison, Ben Hall, Ned Kelly, Frederick Bailey Deeming and Louis de Rougemont.

Clune wrote for many magazines including Walkabout, The Bulletin, Pacific Islands Monthly, Smith's Weekly and ABC Weekly as well as his own Frank Clune’s Adventure Magazine, illustrated by Allan Jordan and published over 8 issues in 1948. He broadcast "Roaming Round Australia" regularly on The ABC from 1945 to 1957.

He was an effective promoter of Albert Namatjira and Australian Aborigines generally.

Clune had his detractors in the literary world. He was criticised for embellishing the facts in the interests of the narrative, and was met with hostility by General Sir Thomas Blamey for his "irregular methods and indiscreet utterances" during WWII. Regardless of criticism, by the early 1950s, his books had sold in excess of 500,000 copies.

== Association with the art world ==
In the 1940s, Frank and Thelma Clune opened an art gallery in Kings Cross which was subsequently to house works by many of Australia's best known painters, including Sir Russell Drysdale, John Passmore and John Olsen.

In the 1950s and 1960s, with Thelma and youngest son Terry, he opened the Terry Clune Art Galleries on the corner of Challis Avenue and Macleay Street, and at 59 Macleay Street in Kings Cross. The gallery became the home for Sydney's young expressionists, such as John Olsen, Stan Rapotec, Robert Klippel and Robert Hughes. The gallery later became the home of artist Martin Sharp and was then known as Yellow House. Frank and Thelma Clune were great friends and supporters of artist William Dobell for many years.

== Death ==
Clune died on 11 March 1971 at St Vincent's Hospital, Sydney at Darlinghurst, age 77. He was buried at South Head Cemetery. He was survived by his wife Thelma and his two sons: Anthony Patrick (1930–2002) and Terry Michael (1932-2025).

== Recognition and awards ==
Clune's portrait was painted by Sir William Dargie and by Sir William Dobell for the 1950 Archibald Prize.

He was appointed an Officer of the Order of the British Empire (OBE) in 1967 for services to Australian literature.

== Influence ==
Clune's 1959 book Jimmy Governor - the true story was the inspiration for Thomas Keneally's 1972 novel The Chant of Jimmie Blacksmith.

== Selected publications ==
His published books include:

- Try Anything Once 1933 (Autobiography)
- Rolling Down the Lachlan 1935
- Roaming Round the Darling 1936
- Dig (about Burke and Wills) 1937
- Free and Easy Land 1938
- Sky High to Shanghai 1939
- To the Isles of Spice 1940
- Chinese Morrison 1940 (about George Ernest Morrison)
- All Aboard for Singapore 1941
- D'Air Devil 1941
- Last of the Australian Explorers: the story of Donald Mackay 1942 (about Donald George Mackay)
- Prowling through Papua 1942
- Tobruk to Turkey 1943
- The Red Heart 1944
- Captain Starlight 1945 (about the inspirations for Captain Starlight in Robbery Under Arms)
- Pacific Parade 1945
- The Forlorn Hope 1945 (about voyage of boat Forlorn Hope from NT to WA in 1865)
- The Greatest Liar on Earth 1945 (about De Rougemont)
- Pacific Parade 1945
- Dark Outlaw (about Frank Gardiner) 1945
- Try Nothing Twice 1946 (second Autobiography)
- Golden Goliath 1946 - about the discovery of gold in Australia
- Song of India 1946
- Roaming around Australia 1947
- Ben Hall the Bushranger 1947 (about Ben Hall)
- A Noose for Ned 1948
- High Ho to London 1948
- Wild Colonial Boys 1948
- The Demon Killer 1948 - about Frederick Bailey Deeming
- Sky High to Shanghai 1948
- Land of My Birth (short stories) 1949
- Land of Hope and Glory 1949
- Ashes of Hiroshima 1950
- All Roads Lead to Rome 1950
- Hands across the Pacific 1951
- Somewhere in New Guinea 1951
- Gunman Gardiner 1951 (new edition of Dark Outlaw)
- Castles in Spain 1952
- Flying Dutchmen 1953
- Land of Australia 1953
- Roaming round Europe 1954
- The Viking of Van Diemen's Land (about Jørgen Jørgensen) 1954
- Roaming round Europe 1954
- The Kelly Hunters 1954
- Bound for Botany Bay 1954 - about the journey of the Hillsborough
- Korean Diary 1955
- Martin Cash 1955 (about Martin Cash)
- Overland Telegraph 1955
- Roaming round New Zealand 1956
- Captain Melville 1956 - about bushranger Captain Melville
- Scandals of Sydney Town 1957
- The Fortune Hunters 1957
- Flight to Formosa 1958
- A Tale of Tahiti 1958
- Murders on Maunga-tapu 1959
- The Blue Mountains Murderer 1959
- Jimmy Governor 1959 (about Jimmy Governor)
- Journey to Canberra 1960
- Saga of Sydney . Halstead Press, 1961
- Across the Snowy Mountains 1962
- The Pirates of the Brig 'Cyprus' 1962 (about Cyprus Mutiny)
- Bound for Botany Bay 1964
- Journey to Kosciusko 1964
- Search for the Golden Fleece 1965
- Journey to Pitcairn 1966
- The Norfolk Island Story 1967. Angus & Robertson Books. (ISBN 0 207 14537 7).
- King of the Road 1967 - about Frank Gardiner
- Serenade to Sydney 1967
- Scallywags of Sydney Cove 1968
- The Scottish Martyrs 1969
- Captain Bully Hayes 1970 (about Bully Hayes)
- Rascals, Ruffians and Rebels of Early Australia (collection) 1987

== See also ==
- Angus & Robertson
- Ion Idriess
- George Blaikie
- Cyril Pearl
- Mrs Henry A. Doudy

== Sources ==
- The Oxford Companion to Australian Literature W H Wilde (2nd edition 1994) ISBN 0-19-553381-X
