= Ann Haven Morgan =

American zoologist and ecologist (1882–1966)

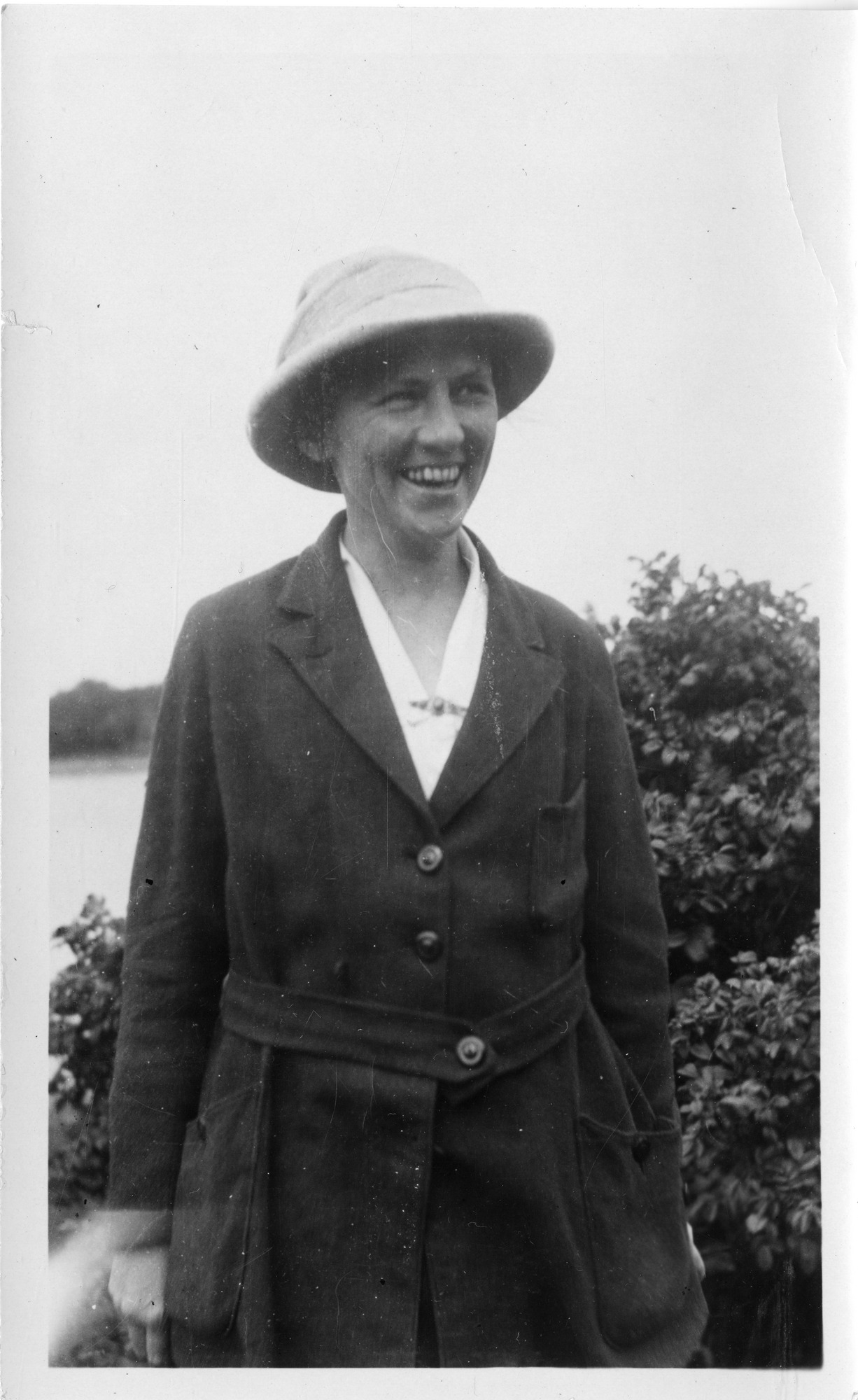
- Born: 6 May 1882; Waterford, Connecticut
- Died: 5 June 1966 (aged 84); South Hadley, Massachusetts
- Scientific career
- Fields: Zoology

Ann Haven Morgan (born "Anna" May 6, 1882 – June 5, 1966) was an American zoologist and ecologist.

== Biography ==
One of three children of Stanley G. Morgan and Julia A. Douglass Morgan, Anna Morgan was born in Waterford, Connecticut and attended Williams Memorial Institute in New London, Connecticut. In 1902, Anna joined Wellesley College then transferred to Cornell University. After receiving a B.A in 1906, she worked as an assistant and instructor for the Mount Holyoke College department of zoology until 1909. At Cornell University, she was awarded a Ph.D. in 1912 with a dissertation titled, A Contribution to the Biology of the May-fly, after which she became a professor at Mount Holyoke College. Morgan became an associate professor in 1914, then a full professor in 1918. From 1916–1947 she was the chair of the Mount Holyoke zoology department, serving until she retired. During this period, in the summer months she also taught marine zoology at the Woods Hole Marine Biological Laboratory. She died of stomach cancer in South Hadley, Massachusetts. In her will, Morgan allocated funds to the American Association of University Women, which were to be used to create the Elizabeth Adams-Ann Morgan fellowship.

Her research and instruction focused on limnology, animal hibernation, and ecological and environmental issues. During WWII, Morgan started studying ecosystems of the great lakes in Massachusetts. Within this research, she concluded that conservation of these environments would directly lead to more food for humans during wartime, as the protection of fish and their habitats leads to more fish for humans to eat. She authored three books on zoology. The 1933 edition of American Men of Science listed her along with two other women among the 250 total entries. She was awarded research fellowships from the American Association for the Advancement of Science, the Rockefeller Foundation and the National Academy of Sciences.

== Bibliography ==
- Kinships of Animals and Man (1955)
- Field Book of Animals in Winter (1939)
- Field Book of Ponds and Streams: an Introduction to the Life of Fresh Water (1930)
