= Robert Boates =

Canadian poet

Robert Boates (born 1954 in Hamilton, Ontario, Canada) is a Canadian poet. In 1989 he suffered a head injury which caused brain trauma, damaging the language center of his brain. His poetry, which is clear, erudite, well-crafted, intelligent, and economical, "provides a literary voice for survivors of brain trauma, documenting his passage in a second life." In 2006 he published He Carries Fear with Cactus Tree Press. His style, in its contemporariness-without-ornament, can be reminiscent of Larry Levis.
