= Anne Morgan (author) =

Australian children's author

- Born: 16 November 1954 (age 71); Hobart, Tasmania, Australia
- Education: Edith Cowan University; University of Tasmania
- Occupation: Children's author

Anne Therese Morgan (born 16 November 1954) is an Australian writer of children's books and plays, and poetry.

== Biography ==
Born in Hobart, Tasmania, she attended St Joseph's School, Hobart, and Mount Carmel College, Sandy Bay, before training as an English, Drama and Biology teacher at the Tasmanian College of Advanced Education, Mount Nelson (1972–1975). She began her teaching career at Burnie High School, and then taught in remote locations in the Northern Territory. In 1978 she toured outback Queensland schools as an actor with the Queensland Theatre Company. She returned to Hobart to teach young unemployed people. In the early 1980s she completed a Master of Education degree at the University of Tasmania and worked in the Australian Public Service in Hobart for fourteen years. In 2008 she completed a PhD in Writing at Edith Cowan University in Perth, and was awarded the 2009 Faculty of Education and the Arts Research Medal.

Her first children's picture book, The Glow Worm Cave (illustrated by Belinda Kurczok) was published by Aboriginal Studies Press in 1999. Since then she has had seven more stories for children published, including the Captain Clawbeak children's series, published by Random House Australia.

Her latest children's book, The Smallest Carbon Footprint in the Land & Other Ecotales (2013), is illustrated by Gay McKinnon and published by IP Kidz. The Sky Dreamer (2011), also published IP Kidz, is illustrated by Swiss artist, Celine Eimann. A French version of The Sky Dreamer (Le Bateau de Reves) also appeared in 2011, translated by Celine Eimann. This surreal picture book deals with a young boy's journey through grief after the death of his beloved sister.

Anne Morgan's first full-length poetry collection, A Reckless Descent from Eternity, was published by Ginninderra Press, Port Adelaide, in 2009. She currently lives on Bruny Island, Tasmania, and writes full-time.

== Awards ==
- The Wilderness Society's Environmental Children's Book of the Year 2014, (Junior Fiction, equal winner) for The Smallest Carbon Footprint in the Land and Other Ecotales.
- The Edith Cowan University Faculty of Education and the Arts Postgraduate Research Medal, 2009.
- Highly Commended in the Wildcare Tasmania international Nature Writing Award, 2009.
- Captain Clawbeak and the Red Herring was featured in the NSW School Magazine's Bookshelf of Forty Excellent Books, 2007.
- Highly Commended in Island's Gwen Harwood Poetry Prize, 2006.
- The S.A.E. Strom Maritime Short Story Award, sponsored by the Shiplovers’ Society of Victoria, 2001.
- Shortlisted in the Wilderness Society's Environment Children's Literature Award for The Glow Worm Cave, 2000.
- The Banjo Paterson Open Poetry Prize, sponsored by the Orange Arts Council 1999.

== Publications ==
- The Glow Worm Cave, 1999
- The Crown and Gown, 2002
- Warts ‘n’ All, illustrated by Judith Rossell, 2003
- Captain Clawbeak and the Red Herring, 2006
- Captain Clawbeak the One and Only, 2007
- Captain Clawbeak and the Ghostly Galleon, 2007
- A Reckless Descent from Eternity, 2009
- The Sky Dreamer (Le Bateau de Reves), 2011
- The Smallest Carbon Footprint in the Land & Other Ecotales, 2013
