= John Thompson (Australian poet) =

Australian poet, writer and radio broadcaster (1907–1968)

- Born: John Joseph Meagher Thompson; 20 December 1907; Kew, Victoria, Australia
- Died: 19 July 1968 (aged 60); Darlinghurst, Sydney, Australia
- Occupations: Poet and broadcaster
- Writing career
- Language: English
- Years active: 1944–1968
- Notable work: Thirty Poems
- Notable awards: Grace Leven Prize for Poetry

John Joseph Meagher Thompson (20 December 1907 – 19 July 1968) was an Australian poet, writer and radio broadcaster.

Thompson was born in Kew, Victoria, Australia. He was educated at Melbourne Church of England Grammar School and the University of Melbourne, where he obtained a BA in 1929. In 1931, he travelled to London, where he attempted to make a living as a writer.

He was awarded the Grace Leven Prize for Poetry in 1954, for his collection Thirty Poems, and wrote poetry throughout his adult life.

He met and married Patricia Drakeford Cole in 1938 and worked at a number of jobs before returning to Australia in early 1939. The couple landed in Perth, Western Australia, where Thompson got a job as an announcer with the Australian Broadcasting Commission (ABC). In December 1942, he enlisted in the Australian Imperial Force, serving in Australia in an educational capacity, before being discharged from the army on 2 August 1945 to work as a war correspondent for the ABC.

After the war, he settled in Sydney where he became a senior feature writer and producer at the ABC, and where he remained until retirement in 1968.

Thompson and his wife had one son, the film critic Peter Thompson, and adopted another, the actor Jack Thompson. John Thompson died in 1968, following an operation for a duodenal ulcer.

== Bibliography ==
=== Poetry collections ===
- Three Dawns Ago (1935)
- Sesame and Other Poems (1944)
- Thirty Poems (1954)
- I Hate and I Love : Poems (1964)

=== Anthologies ===
- The Penguin Book of Australian Verse (1958), edited with Kenneth Slessor and R. G. Howarth
- Australian Poetry 1965 (1965)

=== Non-fiction ===
- Hubbub in Java (1946) history and politics
- On Lips of Living Men (1962) biography
- Five to Remember (1964) biography
