= Brian Vrepont =

Australian poet

- Born: Benjamin Arthur Truebridge; 23 September 1882; Carlton, Victoria, Australia
- Died: 10 March 1955 (aged 72); Perth, Western Australia
- Occupation: writer
- Writing career
- Language: English

Brian Vrepont (1882–1955), born Benjamin Arthur Truebridge, was an Australian poet who published his work under a pseudonym which was a "Frenchified version of Truebridge".

== Early life ==
Truebridge was born in the inner-city Melbourne suburb of Carlton in 1882, the eldest of six children of William Molish Truebridge, compositor, and his wife Irene, née Greenslade. After an early marriage and divorce Truebridge worked his way around Australia and New Zealand for the next decade as fruit-picker, gold fossicker, music teacher, and masseur. During this time he began publishing some poetry in the pages of The Bulletin magazine.

== Writing career ==
By 1934 Truebridge had settled in Brisbane and started writing prolifically, publishing his first collection that same year. In 1939 he won the C. J. Dennis memorial prize for "The Miracle", a long philosophical poem. Then, in 1940 he, along with Clem Christesen, James Picot and Paul Grano founded Meanjin Papers - still published today as Meanjin magazine.

He married for a second time in 1939, moved to Sydney and eventually settled in Perth, Western Australia. His second marriage broke down in 1950 and he died, in Perth, in 1952.

== Poetry collections ==
- Plays and Flower Verses for Youth (1934)
- Oh, Marjorie Ann (1936)
- "Spud" - Everybodys' Dawg (1936)
- Beyond the Claw : Poems (1943)
