= A. D. Hope =

Australian poet and essayist (1907–2000)

A. D. Hope AC OBE FAHA
- Hope, c. 1969
- Born: 21 July 1907; Cooma, New South Wales
- Died: 13 July 2000 (aged 92); Canberra, Australian Capital Territory
- Education: University of Sydney; University College, Oxford
- Occupations: Poet and essayist
- Spouse: Penelope Robinson (m. 1937; died 1988)
- Children: 3

Alec Derwent Hope AC OBE FAHA (21 July 1907 – 13 July 2000) was an Australian poet and essayist known for his satirical slant. He was also a critic, teacher and academic. He was referred to in an American journal as "the 20th century's greatest 18th-century poet".

== Life ==
Hope was born in Cooma, New South Wales. His father was a Presbyterian minister and his mother a teacher. He was educated partly at home and in Tasmania, where they moved in 1911. Three years later they moved to Sydney. He attended Fort Street High School, the University of Sydney whilst residing at St. Andrew's College and then the University of Oxford on a scholarship. Returning to Australia in 1931 he then trained as a teacher, and spent some time drifting. He worked as a psychologist with the New South Wales Department of Labour and Industry, and as a lecturer in Education and English at Sydney Teachers' College (1937–44).

He was a lecturer at the University of Melbourne from 1945 to 1950, and in 1951 became the first professor of English at the newly founded Canberra University College, later of the Australian National University (ANU) when the two institutions merged. At the ANU he and Tom Inglis Moore created the first full year course in Australian literature at an Australian university. He retired from the ANU in 1968 and was appointed Emeritus Professor.

He was appointed an Officer of the Order of the British Empire in 1972 and a Companion of the Order of Australia in 1981 and awarded many other honours. He died in Canberra, having suffered dementia in his last years, and is buried at the Queanbeyan Lawn Cemetery.

== Poet and critic ==
Although he was published as a poet while still young, The Wandering Islands (1955) was his first collection and all that remained of his early work after most of his manuscripts were destroyed in a fire. Its publication was delayed by concern about the effects of Hope's highly erotic and savagely satirical verse on the Australian public. His frequent allusions to sexuality in his work caused Douglas Stewart to dub him "Phallic Alec" in a letter to Norman Lindsay. His influences were Pope and the Augustan poets, Auden, and Yeats. He was a polymath, very largely self-taught, and with a talent for offending his countrymen. He wrote a book of "answers" to other poems, including one in response to the poem "To His Coy Mistress" by Andrew Marvell.

The reviews he wrote in the 1940s and '50s were feared "for their acidity and intelligence. If his reviews hurt some writers – Patrick White included – they also sharply raised the standard of literary discussion in Australia." However, Hope relaxed in later years. As poet Kevin Hart writes, "The man I knew, from 1973 to 2000, was invariably gracious and benevolent".

Hope wrote in a letter to the poet and academic Catherine Cole: "Now I feel I've reached the pinnacle of achievement when you equate me with one of Yeats's 'wild, wicked old men'. I'm probably remarkably wicked but not very wild, I fear too much ingrained Presbyterian caution". Cole suggests that Hope represented the three attributes that Vladimir Nabokov believed essential in a writer, "storyteller, teacher, enchanter".

Hope's editor and fellow critic was David Brooks who was responsible for posthumously publishing the Selected Poetry and Prose of AD Hope in January, 2000.

== Influence and impact ==
Kevin Hart, reviewing Catherine Cole's memoir of Hope, writes that "When A. D. Hope died in 2000 at the age of 93, Australia lost its greatest living poet". Hart goes on to say that when once asked what poets could do for Australia, Hope replied "oh not much, merely justify its existence".

In 1998 a celebration of his life and works, The Scythe Honed Fine, was published by the National Library of Australia.

== Private life ==
In 1937, he married Penelope Robinson. They had a daughter, Emily, who predeceased her parents in 1979, and two sons, Andrew and Geoffrey, who survived him. Penelope died in 1988.

== Awards ==
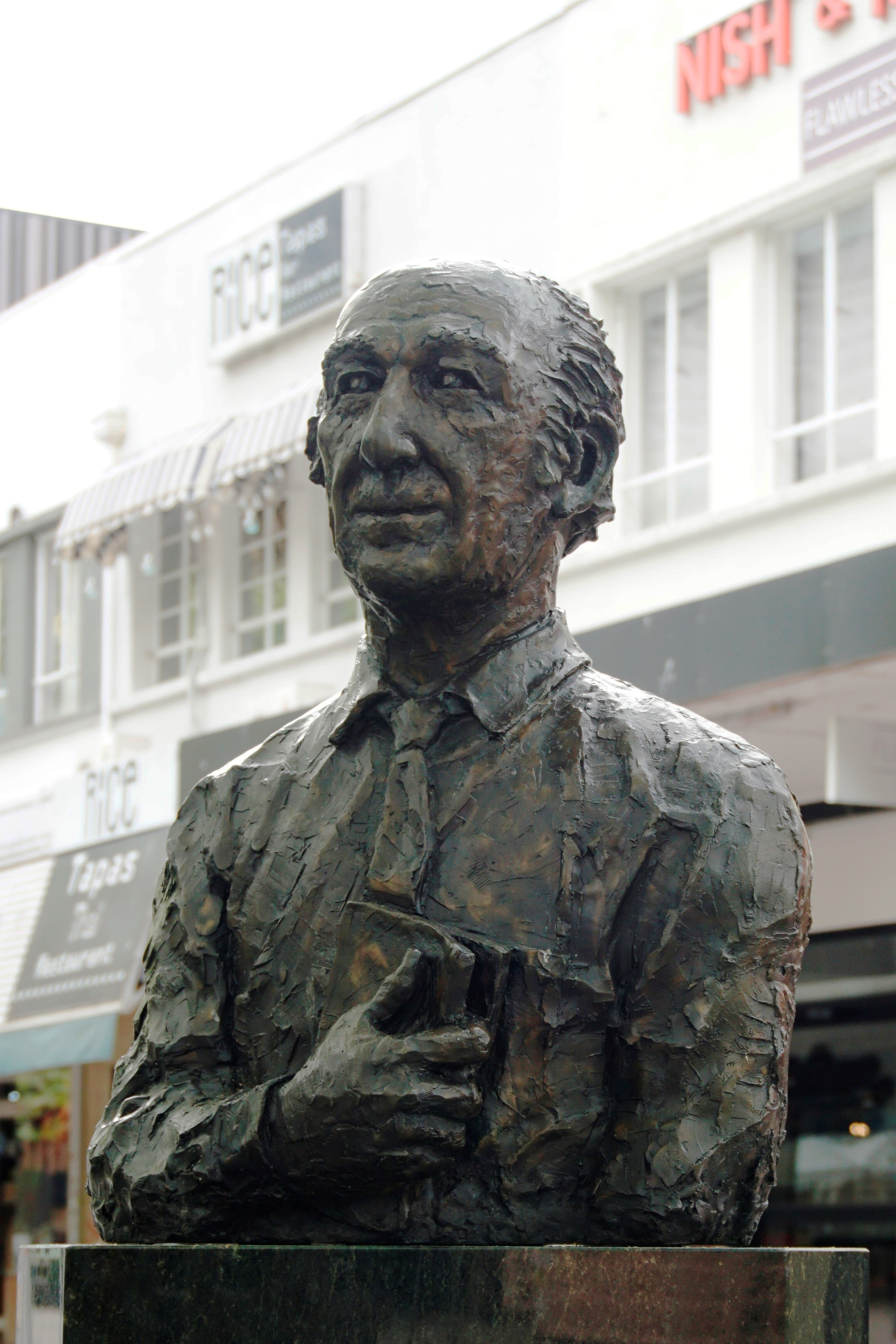
Bust of Hope in Canberra

- 1956: Grace Leven Prize for Poetry
- 1965: Britannica Australia Awards for Literature
- 1966: Australian Literature Society Gold Medal
- 1967: Myer Award for Australian Poetry
- 1969: Ingram Merrill Foundation Award for Literature (New York)
- 1969: Levinson Prize for Poetry (Chicago)
- 1969: Foundation Fellow of the Australian Academy of the Humanities
- 1972: Officer of the Order of the British Empire (OBE)
- 1976: The Age Book of the Year Award for A Late Picking
- 1976: Robert Frost Award for Poetry
- 1981: Companion of the Order of Australia (AC)
- 1989: New South Wales Premier's Literary Awards Special Award
- 1993: ACT Book of the Year Award for Chance Encounters
- Honorary doctorates from four Australian universities

== Bibliography ==
=== Poetry collections ===
- The Wandering Islands (1955) Sydney: Edwards & Shaw.
- Poems (1960) London: Hamish Hamilton
- A.D.Hope (1963) Sydney: Angus and Robertson.
- Collected Poems: 1930–1965 (1966) Sydney: Angus and Robertson.
- New Poems: 1965–1969 (1969) Sydney: Angus and Robertson.
- Dunciad Minor: An Heroik Poem (1970) Melbourne: Melbourne University Press.
- Collected Poems: 1930–1970 (1972) Sydney: Angus & Robertson.
- Selected Poems (1973) Sydney: Angus & Robertson.
- A Late Picking : Poems 1965-1974 (1975) Sydney: Angus & Robertson.
- A Book of Answers (1981) Sydney: Angus & Robertson.
- The Age of Reason (1985) Melbourne: Melbourne University Press.
- Selected Poems (1986) Manchester: Carcanet.
- Orpheus (1991) Sydney: Angus & Robertson.
- Selected Poems (1992) Sydney: Angus & Robertson/Harper Collins.
- The shorter poems of Gaius Valerius Catullus : a new translation; translated by A. D. Hope (2007) Blackheath N.S.W., Brandl & Schlesinger

=== Selected list of poems ===
Title	Year	First published	Reprinted/collected in
"The Death of the Bird"	1955		The Wandering Islands, Edwards and Shaw, 1955, p. 40
"Country Places : Hell, Hay and Booligal!"	1975		A Late Picking: Poems 1965–1974, Angus and Robertson, 1975, p. 59
"The Mayan Books"	1991		Orpheus, Angus and Robertson, 1991, p. 55

=== Plays ===
- The Tragical History of Doctor Faustus: By Christopher Marlowe, purged and amended by A.D. Hope (1982) Canberra: Australian National University Press.
- Ladies from the Sea (1987) Melbourne: Melbourne University Press.

=== Fiction ===
- The Journey of Hsü Shi (1989) Phoenix Review, No. 4.

=== Criticism ===
- "The Discursive Mode: Reflections on the Ecology of Poetry" Quadrant 1/1 (Summer 1956/57): 27–33.
- The Structure of Verse and Prose (1963) Sydney: Australasian Medical Publishing Co.
- Australian Literature 1950–1962 (1963) Melbourne: Melbourne University Press.
- The Cave and the Spring: Essays in Poetry (1965) Adelaide: Rigby. (A second edition was published in 1974 (Sydney: Sydney University Press) with changes and additions.)
- The Literary Influence of Academies (1970) Sydney: Sydney University Press.
- A Midsummer Eve's Dream: Variantions on a Theme by William Dunbar (1970) Canberra: Australian National University Press.
- Henry Kendall: A Dialogue with the Past (1972) Surry Hills: Wentworth Press.
- Henry Kendall (1973) Melbourne: Sun Books.
- Native Companions: Essays and Comments on Australian Literature 1936–1966 (1974) Sydney: Angus & Robertson.
- Judith Wright (1975) Melbourne: Oxford University Press.
- The Pack of Autolycus (1979) Canberra: Australian National University Press.
- The New Cratylus: Notes on the Craft of Poetry (1979) Melbourne: Oxford University Press.
- Directions in Australian Poetry (1984) Townsville: Foundation for Literary Studies.

=== Autobiography ===
- Chance Encounters (1992) Melbourne: Melbourne University Press.

=== Biography ===
- A. D. Hope : A Life by Susan Lever, La Trobe University Press, (2026)

== Sources ==
- Hart, Kevin (26–27 April 2008). "Lines between us and the void: Review of The Poet Who Forgot by Catherine Cole". The Weekend Australian Review Section.
- "MS 5836 Papers of A.D. Hope (1907-2000)". National Library of Australia.
- McCulloch, Ann (2005). Dance of the Nomad: a study of the selected notebooks of A. D. Hope. Canberra: Pandanus Books. p. 366 p. ISBN 1-74076-168-5.
- "On A.D. Hope (TLS, May 19, 2006)". Clive James. Archived from the original on 8 July 2007.
