= Kenneth Mackenzie (author) =

Australian poet and novelist

- Born: Kenneth Ivo Brownley Langwell Mackenzie; 25 September 1913; South Perth, Western Australia
- Died: 19 January 1955 (aged 41); Goulburn, New South Wales
- Other name: Seaforth Mackenzie
- Occupations: journalist, poet, novelist

Kenneth Ivo Brownley Langwell Mackenzie (25 September 1913 – 19 January 1955) was an Australian poet and novelist. His first and best-known novel, The Young Desire It (1937), was published under the pen name Seaforth Mackenzie, when he was 23.

== Life ==
Mackenzie was born in South Perth. He grew up in Pinjarra, Western Australia, and attended Guildford Grammar School. His experiences at Guildford in part inspired his novel of 1937 The Young Desire It, which he began at age 17. His novel Dead Men Rising was about the Cowra breakout of which he had first hand experience, having been stationed there at the time of the event.

He married Kate Bartlett (nee Loveday), in 1935. Their daughter Elizabeth was born in 1936, and son Hugh was born in 1938.

His life in Sydney included involvement with the world of Norman Lindsay and Hugh McCrae and archival records show significant influence from them.

He received a number of literary grants and awards, and left a number of works which have been since edited and published.

In his later years he was separated from his wife who had moved into Sydney, while he lived in limited conditions in Kurrajong.

Mackenzie drowned on 17 January 1955 in Tallong Creek near Goulburn, New South Wales, aged 41. He had been jailed for public drunkenness a few hours before his death; whether it was accidental or a suicide is uncertain.

Most of his works were originally published during his lifetime, however, some material has been reprinted by Text Publishing.

== Writing ==
=== Novels ===
==== As Seaforth Mackenzie ====
- The Young Desire It, London, Cape (1937)
- Chosen People, London, Cape (1938)
- Dead Men Rising, London, Cape (1951)
- The Refuge, London, Cape (1954)

=== Radio Play ===
- Young Shakespeare
- Brief Apocalypse

=== Poetry ===
- Our Earth, Sydney, Angus and Robertson (1937)
- The Moonlit Doorway, Sydney, Angus and Robertson (1944)
- Selected Poems (1961)
- The poems of Kenneth MacKenzie (1972)

=== As editor ===
- Australian poetry, 1951-2 (selected by Kenneth Mackenzie), Sydney : Angus & Robertson (1952)

=== Posthumous collection ===
- Rossiter, Richard (2000) The Model

== Biographical material ==
- Davis, D (1965) Bibliography
- Davis, D (1967) Thesis about MacKenzie
- Jones, Evan (1969) Kenneth Mackenzie: Australian Writers and their Work Melbourne: Oxford University Press.
- Kinross-Smith, Graeme (1980) Australian Writers Melbourne: Thomas Nelson.
