= Governor General's Award for English-language poetry or drama =

Canadian literary award

The Governor General's Award for English-language poetry or drama was a Canadian literary award that annually recognized one Canadian writer for a work of poetry or drama published in English. It was one of the Governor General's Awards for Literary Merit from 1937 to 1980 (publication years, which conventionally date the awards). After 1980 it was divided into the award for English-language poetry and award for English-language drama. The Governor General's Awards program is administered by the Canada Council for the Arts.

The program was created in 1937 and inaugurated that November for 1936 publications in two English-language categories, conventionally called the 1936 awards. The poetry or drama award was introduced one year later, as one of three 1937 Governor General's Awards.

== Winners ==
=== 1930s ===
Year	Author	Title
1937	E. J. Pratt	The Fable of the Goats
1938	Kenneth Leslie	By Stubborn Stars
1939	Arthur S. Bourinot	Under the Sun

=== 1940s ===
Year	Author	Title
1940	E. J. Pratt	Brébeuf and His Brethren
1941	Anne Marriott	Calling Adventurers!
1942	Earle Birney	David and Other Poems
1943	A. J. M. Smith	News of the Phoenix
1944	Dorothy Livesay	Day and Night
1945	Earle Birney	Now is Time
1946	Robert Finch	Poems
1947	Dorothy Livesay	Poems for People
1948	A.M. Klein	The Rocking Chair and Other Poems
1949	James Reaney	The Red Heart

=== 1950s ===
Year	Author	Title
1950	James Wreford Watson	Of Time and the Lover
1951	Charles Tory Bruce	The Mulgrave Road
1952	E. J. Pratt	Towards the Last Spike
1953	Douglas LePan	The Net and the Sword
1954	P. K. Page	The Metal and the Flower
1955	Wilfred Watson	Friday's Child
1956	Robert Ford	A Window on the North
1957	Jay Macpherson	The Boatman
1958	James Reaney	A Suit of Nettles
1959	Irving Layton	Red Carpet for the Sun

=== 1960s ===
Year	Author	Title
1960	Margaret Avison	Winter Sun
1961	Robert Finch	Acis in Oxford
1962	James Reaney	Twelve Letters to a Small Town and The Killdeer and Other Plays
1963	No award presented	
1964	Raymond Souster	The Colour of the Times
1965	Al Purdy	The Cariboo Horses
1966	Margaret Atwood	The Circle Game
1967	Eli Mandel	An Idiot Joy
1967	Alden Nowlan	Bread, Wine and Salt
1968	Leonard Cohen	Selected Poems 1956–68
1969	George Bowering	Rocky Mountain Foot and The Gangs of Kosmos
1969	Gwendolyn MacEwen	The Shadow-Maker

=== 1970s ===
Year	Author	Title
1970	bpNichol	The True Eventual Story of Billy the Kid
1970	Michael Ondaatje	The Collected Works of Billy the Kid
1971	John Glassco	Selected Poems
1972	Dennis Lee	Civil Elegies and Other Poems
1972	John Newlove	Lies
1973	Miriam Mandel	Lions at Her Face
1974	Ralph Gustafson	Fire on Stone
1975	Milton Acorn	The Island Means Minago
1976	Joe Rosenblatt	Top Soil
1977	D. G. Jones	Under the Thunder the Flowers Light Up the Earth
1978	Patrick Lane	Poems New and Selected
1979	Michael Ondaatje	There's a Trick with a Knife I'm Learning to Do
1979	Erín Moure	Empire, York Street
1979	Susan Musgrave	A Man to Marry, a Man to Bury

=== 1980s ===
Year	Author	Title
1980	Stephen Scobie	McAlmon's Chinese Opera
1980	Douglas Lochhead	High Marsh Road
See Governor General's Award for English-language poetry and Governor General's Award for English-language drama for 1981 and after.
