= 1936 in poetry =

Nationality words link to articles with information on the nation's poetry or literature (for instance, Irish or France).

== Events ==
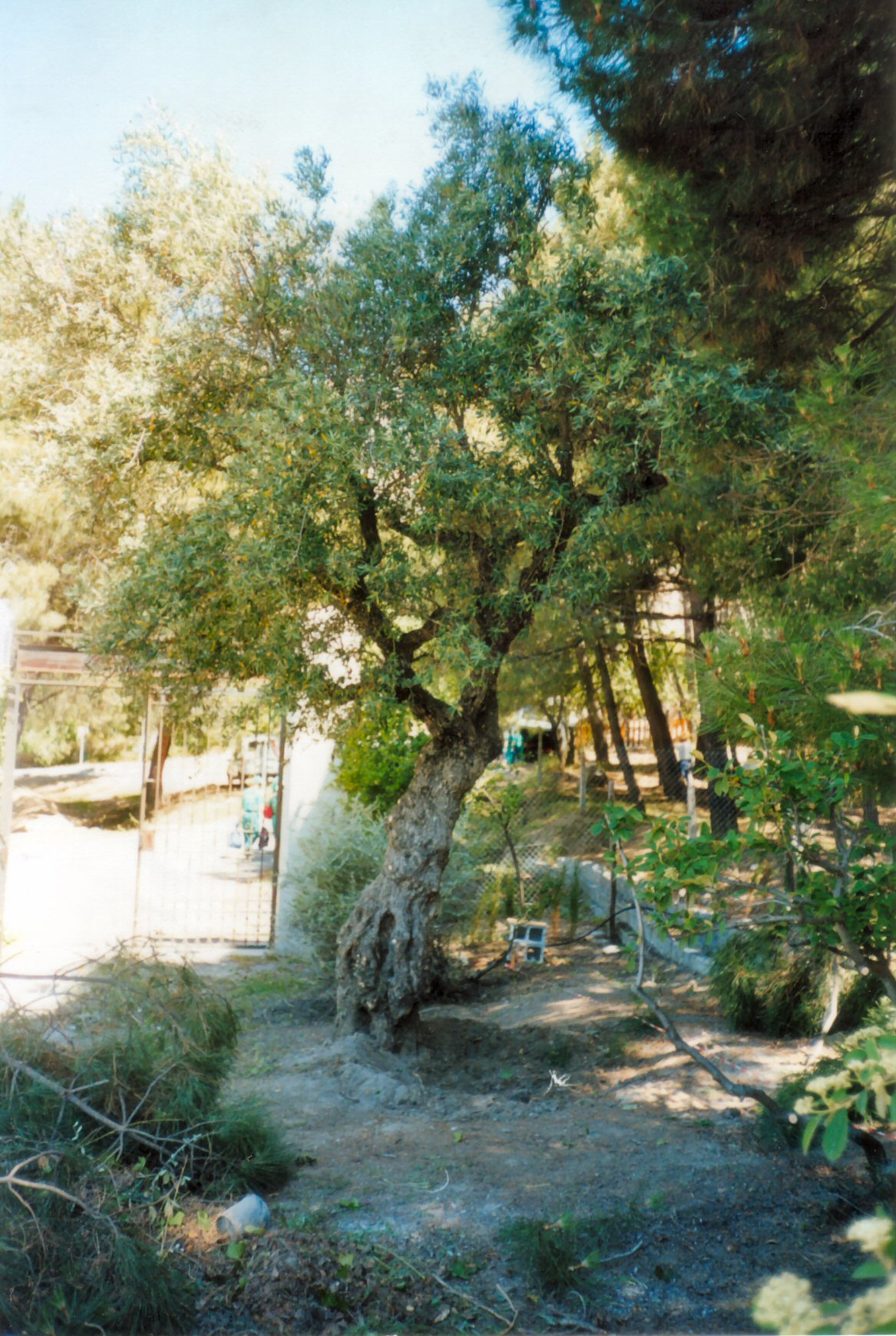
The olive tree near Alfacar where Federico García Lorca is executed on August 19, as it is in 1999. Many people have left quotations from his works in its branches.

- January – Canadian Poetry Magazine first published by the Canadian Authors Association, with E. J. Pratt's active involvement. It becomes associated with more traditional poetry, very popular in Canada at this time.
- May
  - In Nazi Germany, the SS magazine Das Schwarze Korps attacks the expressionist and experimental poetry of German Gottfried Benn as degenerate, Jewish and homosexual.
  - Greek poet and Communist activist Yiannis Ritsos is inspired to write his landmark poem Epitaphios by a photograph of a dead protester during a massive tobacco-workers demonstration in Thessaloniki; it is published soon afterwards. In August, the right-wing dictatorship of Ioannis Metaxas comes to power in Greece and copies are burned publicly at the foot of the Acropolis in Athens.
- August 18 – 38-year-old Spanish dramatist and poet Federico García Lorca is among those arrested by Francoist militia during the White Terror at the beginning of the Spanish Civil War and is never seen again.
- James Laughlin founds New Directions Publishing in New York, which publishes many modern poets for the first time.
- A version of J. R. R. Tolkien's influential lecture "Beowulf: The Monsters and the Critics" is published in Proceedings of the British Academy.
- W. B. Yeats begins delivering broadcast lectures on the BBC (the lectures continue into 1937), and makes recordings of his own verse.

== Works published in English ==
=== Canada ===
- W. E. Collin, The White Savannahs, the first collection of criticism of contemporary poetry in Canada from a modernist perspective; written by a professor of French at the University of Western Ontario
- Kenneth Leslie, Such a Din! Poems. Halifax: McCurdy.
- New Provinces, first anthology of modernist poetry in Canada, including work by F. R. Scott, E. J. Pratt, Robert Finch, A. J. M. Smith, Leo Kennedy, A. M. Klein.
- Marjorie Pickthall, The Complete Poems of Marjorie Pickthall, 2nd edition. (Toronto: McClelland & Stewart). Posthumously published
- Charles G. D. Roberts, Selected Poems of Sir Charles G.D. Roberts. (Toronto: Ryerson).
- Frederick George Scott, Poems

=== India, in English ===
- Harindranath Chattopadhyaya, Strange Journey (Poetry in English ), Pondicherry: Bharatha Shakthy Nilayam
- Nilima Devi, The Hidden Face (Poetry in English ), Calcutta: Futurist Publishing House
- P. R. Kaikini, Songs of a Wanderer (Poetry in English); Bombay: New Book Co.
- M. S. Nirmal, Song of Immortality (Poetry in English), Lahore: Model Electric Press
- Brajendranath Seal, The Quest Eternal (Poetry in English)
- Subho Tagore, Peacock Plumes (Poetry/in English ),

=== New Zealand ===
- Ursula Bethell, Time and Place: poems by the author of 'From a garden in the Antipodes, Christchurch: Caxton Press
- Robin Hyde:
  - Passport to Hell
  - Check To Your King

=== United Kingdom ===
- W. H. Auden, Look, Stranger!
- Julian Bell, Work for the Winter
- Edmund Blunden, Verses: To H.R.H. The Duke of Windsor
- Roy Campbell, Mithraic Emblems
- Cecil Day-Lewis, Noah and the Waters
- T. S. Eliot, Collected Poems 1909–35, including "Burnt Norton", first of the Four Quartets
- John Gawsworth edits anonymously Edwardian Poetry, Book One (anthology)
- A. E. Housman, More Poems
- James Joyce, Collected Poems
- Patrick Kavanagh, Ploughman, and Other Poems
- F. R. Leavis, Revaluation: tradition & development in English poetry rejects Milton, Spenser and Shelley, and praises Donne, Pope, Gerard Manley Hopkins, T. S. Eliot and others (criticism)
- Louis MacNeice, translation from the original Ancient Greek, The Agamemnon of Aeschylus
- Robert Nichols, A Spanish Triptych
- Ruth Pitter, A Trophy of Arms, preface by James Stephens
- Michael Roberts edits The Faber Book of Modern Verse, which praises poets such as W. H. Auden and T. S. Eliot and ignores poets like Robert Frost and Thomas Hardy (anthology)
- Sacheverell Sitwell, Collected Poems, introductory essay by Edith Sitwell
- William Soutar, A Handful of Earth
- Dylan Thomas, Twenty-five Poems, including "And death shall have no dominion"
- Edward Thomas (killed in action 1917), Collected Poems, Faber and Faber
- W. B. Yeats, editor, The Oxford Book of Modern Verse 1892-1935 (anthology)

=== United States ===
- Conrad Aiken, Time in the Rock
- W. H. Auden, Look, Stranger! (Anglo-American)
- Stephen Vincent Benét, Burning City
- Lilian Bowes Lyon, Bright Feather Fading
- E. E. Cummings, 1/20
- Emily Dickinson, Unpublished Poems
- Paul Engle, Break the Heart's Anger
- John Gould Fletcher, The Epic of Arkansas
- Robert Frost, A Further Range
- Robinson Jeffers, The Beaks of Eagles
- Archibald MacLeish, Public Speech
- Edgar Lee Masters, Poems of People
- Marianne Moore, The Pangolin and Other Verse
- Ogden Nash, The Bad Parents' Garden of Verse
- New Directions publishes its first book and its first "annual", New Directions in Prose and Poetry with contributions from Wallace Stevens, Ezra Pound, Elizabeth Bishop, Marianne Moore, William Carlos Williams and others
- Dorothy Parker, Not So Deep as a Well: Collected Poems
- Kenneth Patchen, Before the Grave
- Frederic Prokosch, The Assassins
- Lizette Woodworth Reese, The Old House in the Country
- Charles Reznikoff, Separate Way, including "The Socialists of Vienna" (Objectivist Press)
- Carl Sandburg, The People, Yes, Harcourt Brace Jovanovich
- Winfield Townley Scott, Elegy for Robinson
- Wallace Stevens:
  - Ideas of Order, includes "Farewell to Florida," "The Idea of Order at Key West," "Academic Discourse at Havana," "Like Decorations in a Nigger Cemetery," and "A Postcard from the Volcano"), Knopf, enlarged from the 1935 edition
  - Owl's Clover, Alcestis Press (contents later incorporated into Opus Posthumous 1952)
- John Hall Wheelock, Poems, 1911–1936
- William Carlos Williams, Adam & Eve & The City

=== Other in English ===
- Rex Ingamells, Forgotten People published in Adelaide; including "Garrakeen"; Australia

== Works published in other languages ==
=== France ===
- Paul Éluard, pen name of Paul-Eugène Grindel, Les Yeux fertiles
- Francis Jammes, Sources, Paris: Le Divan
- Pierre Jean Jouve, Hélène
- Henri Michaux, Voyage en Grand Garabagne
- Benjamin Péret, Je sublime
- Saint-John Perse, Poème pour Valery Larbaud, Liège: A la Lampe d'Aladdin; France

=== Indian subcontinent ===
Including all of the British colonies that later became India, Pakistan, Bangladesh, Sri Lanka and Nepal. Listed alphabetically by first name, regardless of surname:

==== Bengali ====
- Mohitlal Majumdar, Smara-garal, Bengali
- Rabindranath Tagore, in these two works as well as in some others of the mid- and early 1930s, the author introduced a new rhythm in poetry that "had a tremendous impact on the modern poets", according to Indian academic Sisir Kumar Das:
  - Patrput
  - Syamali

Muhammad Iqbal

==== Urdu ====
- Maulana Mohammad Ali Jauhar, "Kulam-i Jauhar", an Urdu poem edited and with an introduction by Abudul Majid Daryabadi
- Sir Muhammad Iqbal, Zarb-i-Kalim, also rendered "Zarbe Kalim" (or The Rod of Moses), philosophical poetry book in Urdu; the author's third collection in the Urdu language; the 183 poems include some ghazals; divided into six parts, including Islam and Muslims, Education, and Fine Arts (Iqbal also published a book in Persian this year)
- P. T. Narasimhachar (also known as "Pu.Ti.Na."), Mandaliru, 23 lyrics in Sanskritized Urdu

Translation, commentary and critical appreciation of Pas Cheh Bayad Kard and Masnavi Musafir in Urdu by Dr Elahi Bakhsh Akhtar Awan, publishers University Book Agency Peshawar Pakistan, 1960.

==== Other Indian languages ====
- Changampuzha Krishna Pillai Ramanan, Malayalam-language poem about the life, love and death of his friend, the poet Edappalli Raghavan Pillai (1909–1936)
- Haridasa Siddhantavagish, Sankara Sambhavam Khandakavya, a mythological poem in Sanskrit
- Idappalli Raghavan Pillai, Maninadam, Malayalam
- Kulachandra Gautam, Prapanica Carca, religious verses in Nepali by an eminent Sanskrit scholar and translator
- Mahadevi Varma, Sandhyagit, considered significant lyrics in the Chayavadi (Indian romanticism) tradition; Hindi
- Mahjoor, Taran-e Vatan, Kashmiri
- Mohan Singh, Save Pattar, Punjabi romantic lyrics
- Sir Muhammad Iqbal, Pas Chih Bayad Kard ay Aqwam-i-Sharq (or What should then be done O people of the East), philosophical poetry book in Persian (Iqbal also published a book in Urdu this year; see above)
- Sumitranandan Pant, Yugant, Hindi poems reflecting the author's transition from the Chayavad (Indian romanticism) tradition to Pragtivad
- Suryakant Tripathi Nirala, Gitika, including poems on God, the beauty of nature, women, national awakening and philosophy; Hindi

=== Spanish language ===
==== Peru ====
- Rafael Méndez Dorich, Dibujos animados (Lima)
- Enrique Peña Barrenechea, Elegía a Bécquer y retorno a la sombra
- César Vallejo, Nómina de huesos ("Payroll of Bones")
- José Varallanos, Primer cancionero cholo

==== Spain ====
- Federico García Lorca (killed this year; see deaths, below):
  - Diván del Tamarit (Spanish for "The Diván of Tamarit") written this year, will be published in 1941);
  - Sonetos del amor oscuro ("Sonnets of Dark Love") published this year
  - Primeras canciones ("First Songs") published this year
- Jorge Guillén, Cántico, second, enlarged edition, with 125 poems in seven sections (first edition, with 75 poems, 1928)
- Miguel Hernández, El rayo que no cesa
- Pedro Salinas, Razón d'amor ("Reason for Love")
- Luis Felipe Vivanco, Cantos de primavera ("Songs of Springtime")

=== Other languages ===
- Gottfried Benn, Ausgewählte Gedichte ("Selected Poems"); when first published in May, the book contains two poems that are deleted for the next edition in November : "Mann und Frau gehen durch die Krebsbaracke" and "D-Zug". The vast majority of the first editions are collected and destroyed.
- Paul la Cour, Dette er vort Liv ("This Is Our Life"), Denmark
- Martinus Nijhoff, Het Uur U, Netherlands
- Millosh Gjergj Nikolla ('Migjeni'), Vargjet e lira ("Free Verses"), suppressed by government censors; enlarged edition with two poems deleted published in 1944, Albania
- Cesare Pavese, Lavorare stanca ("Hard Work"), shortened by four poems deleted by Fascist censors; enlarged edition nearly double in size published in 1942; Florence: Solaria, Italy
- August Sang, Üks noormees otsib õnne, Estonia

== Awards and honors ==
- Pulitzer Prize for Poetry: Robert P. Tristram Coffin: Strange Holiness

== Births ==
Death years link to the corresponding "[year] in poetry" article:

- February 19 – Frederick Seidel, American poet
- March 19 – Anri Volokhonsky (died 2017), Russian poet
- March 24 – John Robert Colombo, Canadian poet, editor and humorist
- March 25 – Neelamperoor Madhusoodanan Nair (died 2021), Indian Malayalam language poet
- March 31 – Marge Piercy, American poet, novelist and social activist
- April 6 – John Pepper Clark (died 2020), Nigerian poet and playwright originally publishing under the name "J. P. Clark"
- April 17 – Brendan Kennelly (died 2021), Irish poet and novelist
- April 29 – Alejandra Pizarnik (suicide 1972), Argentinian poet
- May 28 – Fred Chappell (died 2024), American poet, author and academic
- June 24 – J. H. Prynne (died 2026), English poet, writer, academic, key figure in the British Poetry Revival and a major contributor to The English Intelligencer
- June 26 – Elisabeth Harvor (died 2024), Canadian novelist and poet
- June 27 – Lucille Clifton (died 2010), African-American poet and feminist
- July 9 – June Jordan (died 2002), African-American political activist, writer, poet and teacher
- July 11 – Al Mahmud (died 2019), Bengali poet
- August 24 – A. S. Byatt (died 2023), English novelist and poet
- September 11 – Sandra Hochman, American poet
- November 4 – C. K. Williams (died 2015), American poet
- November 17 – Tarapada Roy (died 2007), Bengali poet, essayist and short-story writer known for his satirical sense of humour
- November 23 – Mats Traat (died 2022), Estonian poet and writer
- November 25 – William McIlvanney (died 2015), Scottish novelist, short story writer and poet
- November 27 – Dahlia Ravikovitch (died 2005), Israeli poet
- December 1 – Saqi Farooqi (died 2018), Indian-born Pakistani Urdu poet
- December 4 – Ken Smith (died 2003), English poet, academic and an editor of the quarterly Stand from in 1963 to 1972
- December 17 – Frank Martinus Arion (died 2015), Curaçaoan novelist and poet
- December 26 – Tormod MacGill-Eain (died 2017), Scottish Gaelic comedian, novelist, poet, musician and broadcaster
- December 27 – Sandra Gilbert (died 2024), American poet, critic and academic
- December 28 – Rashid Hussein (died 1977), Palestinian Arabic poet
- December 31 – Clarence Major, American poet, novelist and painter
- Also:
  - Stewart Conn, Scottish poet and playwright
  - Christopher Wiseman, English-born Canadian poet
  - David Young, American poet and translator, editor and co-founder of FIELD magazine

== Deaths ==
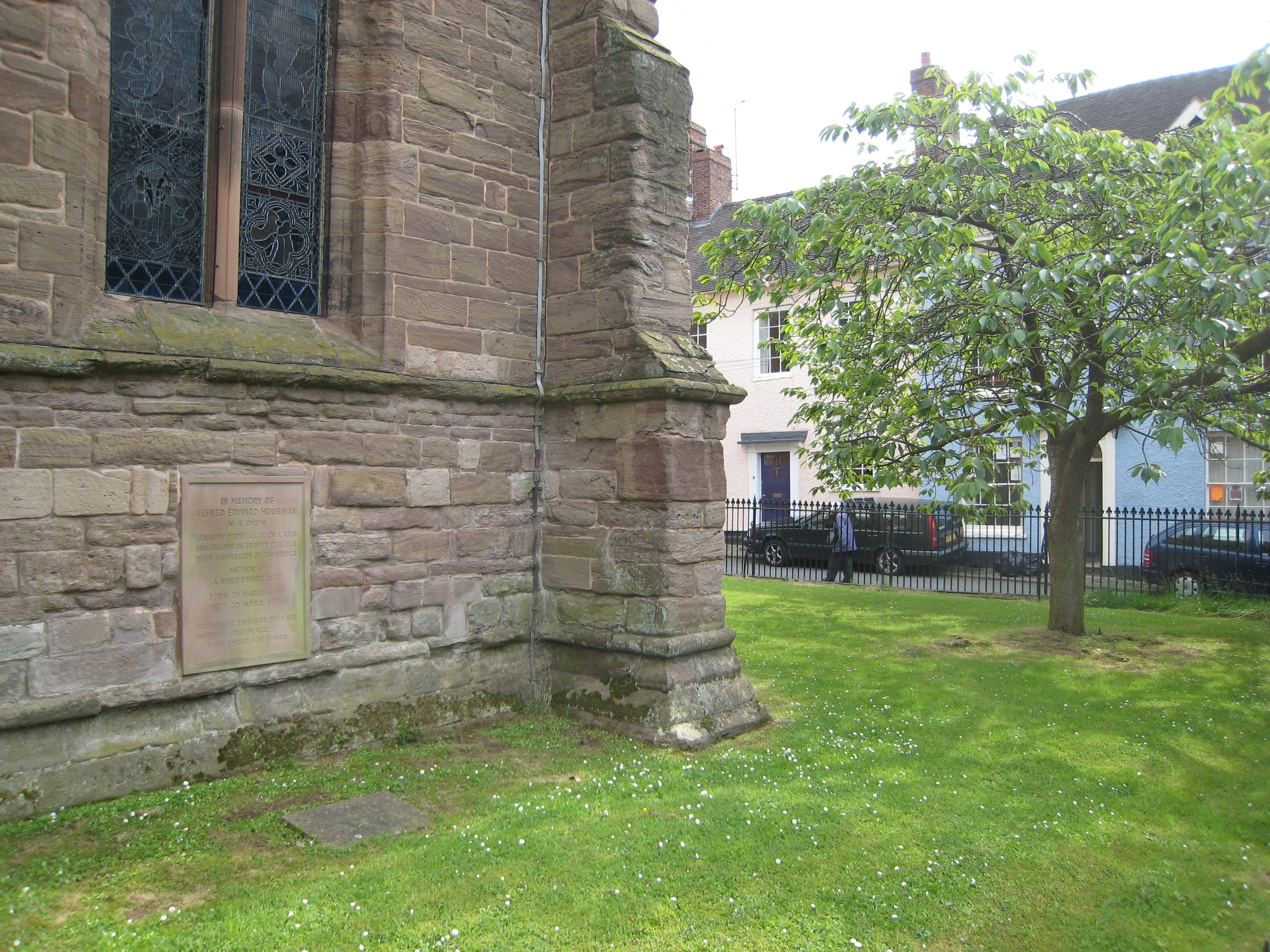
A. E. Housman's grave at St. Laurence's Church in Ludlow

Birth years link to the corresponding "[year] in poetry" article:

- January – Jamil Sidqi al-Zahawi, 73, Arab poet, philosopher and champion of women's rights
- January 18 – Rudyard Kipling, 70 (born 1865), English author and poet, winner of the Nobel prize for literature in 1907
- March 1 – Mikhail Kuzmin, 64 (born 1872), Russian poet, novelist and composer
- March 3 – Govinda Krishna Chettur, 37 (born 1898), Indian poet writing in English, cancer
- March 6 – Carlos Oquendo de Amat, 31 (born 1905), Peruvian-born poet, author of 5 Meters of Poems (1927)
- April 30 – A. E. Housman, 77 (born 1859), English poet, writer and classical scholar, best known for his cycle of poems A Shropshire Lad
- June 11 – Robert E. Howard, 30 (born 1906), American pulp fiction writer and poet, suicide
- June 14 – G. K. Chesterton, 62 (born 1874), English writer, journalist, poet, biographer and Catholic apologist
- July 4 – Edappally Raghavan Pillai, 27 (born 1909), Indian, Malayalam-language poet, suicide
- August 19 – Federico García Lorca, 38 (born 1898), Spanish dramatist, poet, painter, pianist, composer and emblematic member of the Generation of '27, killed by Nationalist partisans at the beginning of the Spanish Civil War (see "Works published" above)
- September 26 – Harriet Monroe, 75 (born 1860), American editor, scholar, literary critic and patron of the arts best known as founder and longtime editor of Poetry magazine, of a cerebral haemorrhage
- October 5 – J. Slauerhoff, 38 (born 1898), Dutch poet and novelist, of aggravated tuberculosis
- December 28 – John Cornford, 21 (born 1915), English Communist poet, in the Spanish Civil War
- December 31 – Miguel de Unamuno, 72 (born 1864), Spanish essayist, novelist, poet, playwright and philosopher
- Also – Kattakkayathil Cherian Mappila (born 1859), Indian, Malayalam-language poet

== See also ==
- Poetry
- List of poetry awards
- List of years in poetry
