= Last spike =

The last spike is the final rail spike driven in the construction of a railway. It is often a momentous occasion and special ceremonial spikes of gold or silver may be used.

Last spike may refer to:

- Last Spike (Canadian Pacific Railway), driven in 1885
  - The Last Spike (book), a 1971 book by historian Pierre Berton, the second volume of an account of the Canadian Pacific Railway's origins and construction
  - Towards the Last Spike, a 1952 poem by Canadian poet E. J. Pratt about the Canadian Pacific Railway construction
- Last Spike (Grand Trunk Pacific Railway), Canada, driven in 1914
- Last Spike Memorial, a monument on the location of the North Island Main Trunk line in New Zealand, driven in 1908
- Golden spike, the final spike of the first transcontinental railroad across the United States, driven in 1869
