= 1952 in poetry =

Nationality words link to articles with information on the nation's poetry or literature (for instance, Irish or France).

== Events ==
- August 12 — Night of the Murdered Poets, the execution of thirteen Soviet Jews in the Lubyanka Prison in Moscow, Soviet Union, including several poets.
- November — The Group British poetry movement of the 1950s and 1960s begins at Downing College, University of Cambridge: Philip Hobsbaum along with two friends – Tony Davis and Neil Morris – dissatisfied with the way poetry has been read aloud in the university, decides to place a notice in the undergraduate newspaper Varsity for people interested in forming a poetry discussion group. Five others, including Peter Redgrove, come along to the first meeting. The group meets once a week during term; it moves to London in 1955.
- E. E. Cummings is appointed to a Charles Eliot Norton Professorship at Harvard.
- Afghan doctor, politician and poet Abdur Rahman Mahmudi is thrown without trial into prison in Deh Mazang for his political activism. He will remain here in brutal conditions for the remainder of the decade during which he will write poems using onion juice as ink.
- Contact, a mimeographed poetry magazine, founded by Ramond Souster (ceases publication in 1954); Contact Press, an important publisher of Canadian poetry, is also founded (closes in 1967).
- Lines Review, a Scottish poetry magazine, is founded by Callum Macdonald in Edinburgh.

== Works published in English ==
Listed by nation where the work was first published and again by the poet's native land, if different; substantially revised works listed separately:

=== Canada ===
- Alfred Bailey, Border River
- Earle Birney, Trial of a City and Other Verse. Toronto: Ryerson.
- Louis Dudek, Raymond Souster and Irving Layton. Cerberus. Toronto: Contact Press, 1952.
- Louis Dudek, The Searching Image. Toronto: Ryerson Press, 1952.
- Louis Dudek, Twenty-Four Poems. Toronto: Contact Press, 1952.
- Wilson MacDonald, The Lyric Year. Toronto: Ryerson.
- Jay Macpherson, Nineteen Poems
- E. J. Pratt, Towards the Last Spike, Toronto: Macmillan. Governor General's Award 1952.

=== India, in English ===
- Sri Aurobindo, Last Poems ( Poetry in English ), mostly philosophical, mystical poetry; Pondicherry: Sri Aurobindo Ashram, posthumously published (died 1950), posthumously published (died 1950)
- Dilip Kumar Roy, Sri Aurobindo Came to Me, Pondicherry: Sri Aurobindo Ashram
- Themis, Poems ( Poetry in English ), 74 mystical lyrics, from the Aurobindoean school; Pondicherry: Sri Aurobindo Ashram
- G. V. Subbaramayya, Songs and Sonnets ( Poetry in English ), Nellore: Viveka Publishers
- Nissim Ezekiel, A Time to Change( Poetry in English ),

=== New Zealand ===
- James K. Baxter, Louis Johnson and Anton Vogt, Poems Unpleasant, Christchurch: Pegasus Press
- A. R. D. Fairburn:
  - Three Poems
  - Strange Rendezvous
- Keith Sinclair, Songs for a Summer and Other Poems
- Robert Thompson, editor, 13 New Zealand Poets

=== United Kingdom ===
- A. Alvarez, Poems
- W. H. Auden, Nones, published February 22 in the United Kingdom (first published in February 1951 in the United States)
- William Buchan, 3rd Baron Tweedsmuir, Personal Poems
- C. Day-Lewis, translation, The Aenid of Virgil (see also The Georgics of Virgil 1940, The Eclogues of Virgil 1963)
- Paul Dehn, Romantic Landscape
- Patric Dickinson, The Sailing Race, and Other Poems
- Lawrence Durrell, A Key To Modern Poetry
- Nissim Ezekiel, Time To Change, Indian living at this time in the United Kingdom
- Gabriel Fielding, The Frog Prince and Other Poems
- Michael Hamburger, translator into English from the German original of Austrian Georg Trakl's Decline: 12 Poems, Guido Morris / Latin Press
- David Jones, The Anathemata
- Thomas Kinsella, The Starlit Eye
- Louis MacNeice, Ten Burnt Offerings
- Edwin Muir, Collected Poems 1921–51
- James Reeves, The Password, and Other Poems
- Sir Osbert Sitwell, Wrack at Tidesend, published on May 16, a sequel to England Reclaimed of 1927 (see also On the Continent 1958)
- Dylan Thomas:
  - Collected Poems 1934–1952
  - In Country Sleep, including the poem "Do Not Go Gentle into that Good Night"
- R.S. Thomas, An Acre of Land

=== United States ===
- R. P. Blackmur, Language as Gesture, criticism
- Robert Creeley, Le Fou, American published in Europe
- Archibald Macleish, Collected Poems, 1917–1952, winner of the Pulitzer Prize
- W. S. Merwin, A Mask for Janus, New Haven, Connecticut: Yale University Press; awarded the Yale Younger Poets Prize, 1952 (reprinted as part of The First Four Books of Poems, 1975)
- Frank O'Hara, A City in Winter and Other Poems
- Kenneth Rexroth, The Dragon and the Unicorn, a verse journal of his European travels
- Wallace Stevens, Selected Poems, Fortune Press
- Jesse Stuart, Kentucky Is my Land
- New World Writing the first of an annual paperback anthology of prose, drama and poetry; continues to 1959 in poetry
- Peter Viereck, The First Morning
- Yvor Winter, Collected Poems

=== Other ===
- R. Berndt, editor, Djanggawul, anthology of Australian poetry
- Seaforth Mackenzie, editor Australian Poetry, 1951-2, Sydney: Angus and Robertson; Australia

== Works published in other languages ==
=== France ===
- Rene-Guy Cadou, Helene ou le regne vegetal, Volume 1, published posthumously (died 1951)
- Jean Cayrol, Les Mots sont aussi des demeures 1952
- Jean Cocteau, Le Chiffre sept
- Pierre Emmanuel, pen name of Noël Mathieu, Babel
- Jean Grosjean, Le Livre du juste
- Benjamin Péret, Air mexicain
- Raymond Queneau, Si tu t'imagines
- Francis Ponge, La Rage de lexpression
- Georges Schéhadé, Les Poésies

=== India ===
In each section, listed in alphabetical order by first name:

==== Hindi ====
- Haradayalu Singh, Ravan, poem written in Braja Bhasa; with characters from classical epic poems and presenting Ravana in a sympathetic light; 17 chapters
- Narmada Prasad Khare, Svar-Pathey
- Ramadhari Singh Dinakar, Rasmi Rathi, epic poem about Karna, a character in the Mahabharata

==== Kannada ====
- D. V. Gundappa, translator, Umarana Osage, translated from the English of Edward Fitzgerald's translation of The Rubaiyatt of Omar Khayyam
- M. Gopalakrishna Adiga, Nadedu Banna Dari, poems showing the transition in Indian poetry from the more idealistic Navodaya tradition to Navya poetry which is more pessimistic and uses imagery to provide structure; Kannada
- Pejavara Sadashiva Rao, Varuna, written before 1950, but differing distinctly from navodaya poetry; using original rhythm and with subject matter from the experiences of an alienated individual; including "Natyotsava", considered by some critics as the earliest navya poem in the Kannada language; published posthumously (the author died at age 26 in Italy)

==== Other languages in India ====
- Amrita Pritam, Sarghi Vela, romantic and progressive poems; Punjabi
- Bahinabai, Bahinabaici Kavita, Marathi
- Birendra Chattopadhyay, Ranur Janya, Bengali
- Chandranath Mishra, Yugacakra, humorous and satirical poems by "a major poet of Maithili", according to Indian academic Sisir Kumar Das (see also Unata pal 1972, a revised and expanded edition)
- Faiz Ahmad Faiz, Dast-e-Saba, Urdu
- Mehr Lal Soni Zia Fatehabadi, Nai Subah (The New Morn), collection of poems published by Adaaraa Seemab, Daryaganj, Delhi in 1952. Urdu
- Gangaprasad Upadhyay, Arodaya mahakavya, epic poem on Swami Dayananda; Sanskrit
- Jnanindra Barma Eka Ratri, Uttara Kranti, Ratnarakha, Oriya
- Mir Shaban Dar, Qissa-e-Bahram Shah, popular romantic poem in masnavi form, modeled on a Persian poem; Kashmiri
- Parsram Rohra, Sitar, Sindhi
- Pinakin Thakore, Alap, Gujarati
- Pir Atiquallah, Pirnama, comic narrative poem in masnavi form on the "Ways of the Pir"; shows the influence of Maqbool; Kashmiri
- Rayaprolu Subba Rao, Rupanavanitamu, poems honoring womanhood and spiritual love; Telugu
- Sreedhara Menon, Onappattukar, Malayalam

=== Other languages ===
- Paul Celan, Poppy and Memory (German: Mohn und Gedächtnis), Romanian-born poet writing in German
- Gabriela Mistral, Los sonetos de la muerte y otros poemas elegíacos, Santiago, Chile: Philobiblion
- Sean O Riordain, Eireaball Spideoige, including "Adhlacadh Mo Mhathar", "Malairt", "Cnoc Melleri" and "Siollabadh", Gaelic-language, Ireland
- Wisława Szymborska: Dlatego żyjemy ("That's Why We Are Alive"), Poland

== Awards and honors ==
- Consultant in Poetry to the Library of Congress (later the post would be called "Poet Laureate Consultant in Poetry to the Library of Congress"): William Carlos Williams appointed this year (but did not serve).
- Bollingen Prize: Marianne Moore
- Frost Medal: Carl Sandburg
- National Book Award for Poetry: Marianne Moore, Collected Poems
- Pulitzer Prize for Poetry: Marianne Moore, Collected Poems
- King's Gold Medal for Poetry: Andrew Young
- Fellowship of the Academy of American Poets: Padraic Colum
- Canada: Governor General's Award, poetry or drama: Towards the Last Spike, E. J. Pratt

== Births ==
Death years link to the corresponding "[year] in poetry" article:

- January 2 – Jimmy Santiago Baca, American poet and writer
- January 10 – Dorianne Laux, American poet
- January 11 – Carla Harryman, American poet and playwright
- January 17 – Barry Dempster, Canadian poet and novelist
- January 20 – Roo Borson, pen name of Ruth Elizabeth Borson, American native living in Canada
- January 25 – Alice Fulton, American poet, author and MacArthur Foundation fellow
- February 24
  - Maxine Chernoff, American novelist, poet and editor
  - Judith Ortiz Cofer, Puerto Rican American author of poetry, short stories, autobiography, essays and young adult novels
- March 12 – Naomi Shihab Nye, American poet and songwriter born to a Palestinian father and American mother
- April 12 – Gary Soto, Mexican-American poet and author
- May – Susan Stewart, American poet, academic and literary critic
- June 20 – Vikram Seth, Indian poet, novelist, travel writer, librettist, children's writer, biographer and memoirist
- June 5 – Mark Jarman, American poet and critic often identified with the "New Narrative" branch of the New Formalism
- August 5 – D. C. Reid, Canadian poet, novelist and short story writer
- August 12 – Robert Minhinnick, Welsh poet and writer
- August 24 – Linton Kwesi Johnson, Jamaican-born musician and poet
- August 28 – Rita Dove, African American poet and author and Poet Laureate of the United States
- September 18 – Alberto Ríos, American poet and writer
- September 21 – Jock Scot, born John Leslie (died 2016), Scottish performance poet
- October 6 – Matthew Sweeney (died 2018), Irish poet
- October 26 – Andrew Motion, English poet, novelist, biographer and Poet Laureate of the United Kingdom
- November 7 – Malca Litovitz, Canadian poet, author and educator
- November 26 – Munawwar Rana (died 2024), Indian Urdu poet
- December 12 – Helen Dunmore (died 2017), English poet
- December 19 – Sean O'Brien, English poet
- December 20 – Sky Gilbert, Canadian poet, writer, actor, academic and drag performer
- Also:
  - Harry Clifton, Irish
  - Menna Elfyn, Welsh
  - Jan Horner, Canadian
  - Wendy Jenkins (died 2022), Australian poet, editor and YA novelist
  - Carole Glasser Langille, Canadian
  - Myron Lysenko, Australian
  - Saida Menebhi (died 1977), Moroccan
  - Maurice Scully, Irish poet and editor.
  - Carolyn Smart, English–Canadian poet and educator
  - Elizabeth Spires, American poet and academic
  - thalia, Greek-born Australian

== Deaths ==
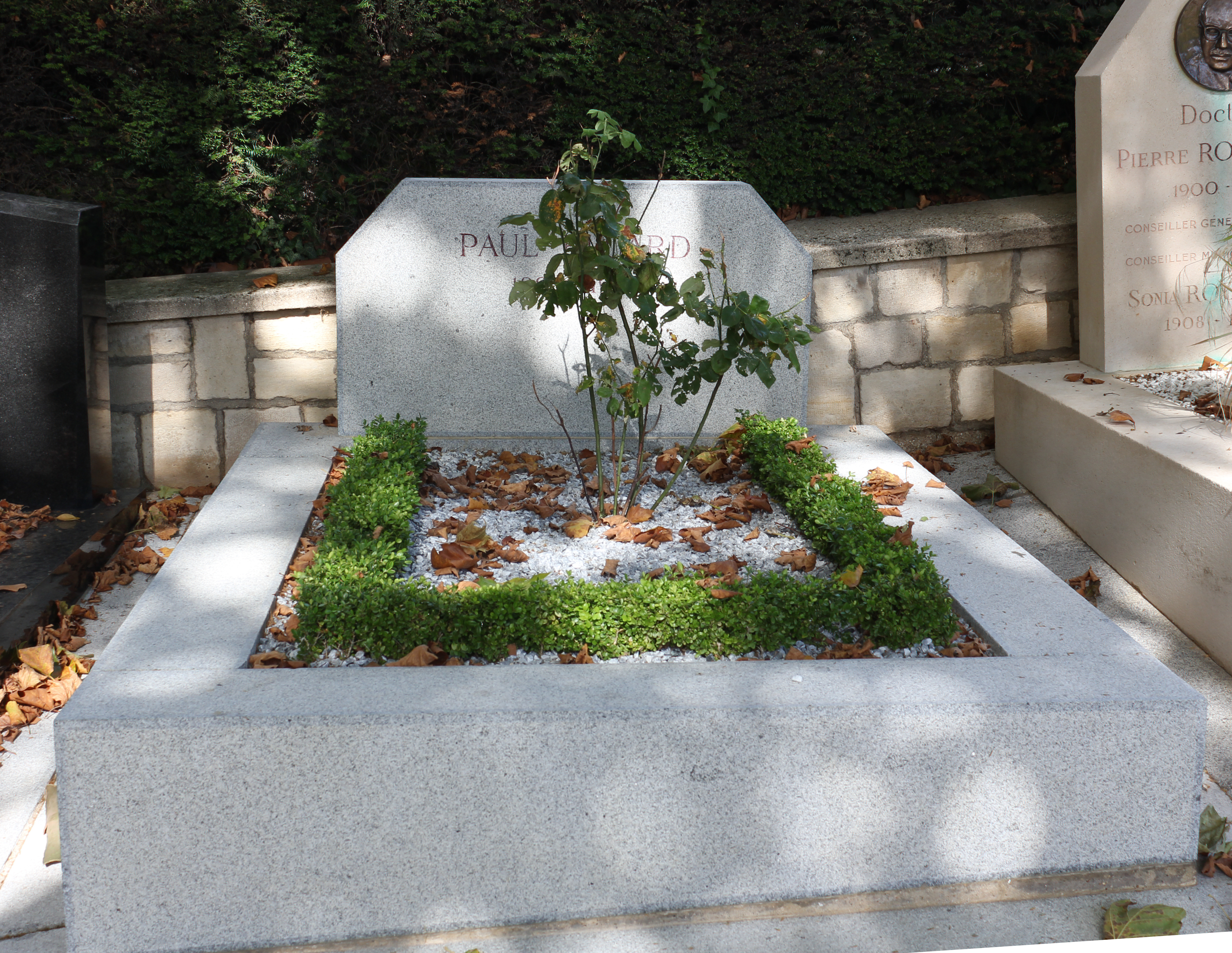
Grave of Paul Éluard

Birth years link to the corresponding "[year] in poetry" article:

- January 22 – Roger Vitrac, 52 (born 1899), French Surrealist poet and dramatist
- February 3 – Kambara Ariake 蒲原有明, pen name of Kambara Hayao (born 1876), Taishō and Shōwa period Japanese poet and novelist
- March 1 – Masao Kume 久米正雄, writing under the pen name "Santei" (born 1891), late Taishō period and early Shōwa period Japanese playwright, novelist and haiku poet
- July 8 – August Alle (born 1890), Estonian writer and poet
- August 1 – Arthur Shearly Cripps (born 1869), English Anglican missionary, short story writer and poet
- August 22 – E. J. Brady (born 1869), Australian
- September 26 – George Santayana (born 1863), Spanish-American philosopher, essayist, poet and novelist
- September 29 – Sotiris Skipis (born 1881), Greek
- November 16 – Charles Maurras, 84 (born 1868), French author, poet and critic
- November 18 – Paul Éluard, 56 (born 1895), French poet; broke with Surrealism on becoming a Stalinist (heart attack)
- November 21 – Henriette Roland Holst (born 1869), Dutch poet and socialist
- November 23 – Aaro Hellaakoski (born 1893), Finnish poet
- December 27 – Patrick Joseph Hartigan, writing under the pen name "Joseph O'Brien" (born 1878), Australian

== See also ==
- Poetry
- List of poetry awards
- List of years in poetry
