= McPhedran =

McPhedran is a surname, from Scottish Gaelic MacPheadarain, "son of little Pheadar", i.e., "son of little Peter". Notable people with the surname include:

- Ian McPhedran (born 1957), Australian journalist and author
- John McPhedran (1949–2015), Canadian wrestler
- Marie McPhedran (1900–1974), Canadian writer
- Marilou McPhedran (born 1951), Canadian politician
