= Leo Kennedy =

Canadian poet and critic

- Born: John Leo Kennedy; August 22, 1907; Liverpool, England
- Died: 2000 (aged 92–93); Pasadena, California, U.S.
- Citizenship: British subject
- Spouses: Miriam; Esther Nicheman Kennedy
- Children: Deborah Ruth Kennedy; Peter Kennedy; Stephen
- Writing career
- Pen name: Arthur Beaton, Leonard Bullen, William Crowl, Helen Laurence, Edgar Main, Peter Quinn
- Language: English
- Genres: poetry, social criticism
- Notable work: The Shrouding

John Leo Kennedy (August 22, 1907 – 2000) was a Canadian poet and critic, who in the 1920s and 1930s was a member of the Montreal Group of modernist poets. The Canadian Encyclopedia says of him that "Kennedy helped change the direction of Canadian poetry in the 1920s."

== Life ==
Born in Liverpool, Kennedy emigrated with his family – his father, John Kennedy, a ship chandler, and his mother, Lillian Bullen – to Canada in 1912. Leo Kennedy quit school at 14, after having to repeat Grade 6; "he took to the sea and held a variety of jobs." In the mid-1920s Kennedy was writing an advice column for the Montreal Star under the name "Helen Laurence."

In the early 1920s he was writing an advice column for the Montreal Star. At the same time, "he was admitted to the Montreal campus of Laval (now the Université de Montréal), where he studied English for two years."

=== Montreal Group ===
"While working at various jobs, Kennedy became affiliated with Leon Edel and others in the McGill Group" or Montreal Group. Becoming a "friend of A. J. M. Smith, F. R. Scott, A. M. Klein, and Leon Edel, he contributed to the McGill Literary Supplement and then to its replacements, the McGill Fortnightly Review, and Canadian Mercury."

After the Fortnightly ceased in 1927, Kennedy and Scott founded the Canadian Mercury in 1928, which put out seven issues through 1929: "though short-lived, the magazine published important work by the editors (including Kennedy's manifesto 'The Future of Canadian Literature') as well as by Smith and A.M. Klein."

=== Publication and radicalization ===
The Crash of 1929 destroyed the Mercury, but Kennedy continued to write and publish. "During the Depression he regularly contributed poems, short stories, and essays to the Canadian Forum and Saturday Night." By that time he was a family man, with a wife, Miriam, and a son, Stephen.

In 1931 Kennedy became friends with novelist and poet Raymond Knister when the latter moved to Montreal. Kennedy and Knister began planning an anthology, similar to Knister's Canadian Short Stories (1928), of Canadian modernist poetry. Knister died the next year, but Scott and Smith got involved in the project. In 1933, at the urging of poet E.J. Pratt, Macmillan published The Shrouding," Kennedy's one poetry book. It was dedicated to Knister. In 1936 the anthology of modernist poetry was published as New Provinces: Poems by several authors. Kennedy, represented with ten poems, was one of six authors.

By the time he appeared with Smith, Scott, Klein, Pratt, and Robert Finch in New Provinces in 1936, Kennedy had repudiated his early work and was seeking a poetry that could contribute to social and political reform." He had become "part of a politically active circle of intellectuals in Montreal and Toronto in the 1930s" and a frequent contributor to leftist magazines. He joined the editorial committee of New Frontier (1936–38), a journal of left-wing opinion and culture, and contributed essays and verse.

At the same time, some "of his socialist writings were published pseudonymously, for he was working throughout the 1930s for advertising agencies in Montreal, Toronto, and Detroit." Pseudonyms he was known to use include Arthur Beaton, Leonard Bullen, William Crowl, Edgar Main, and Peter Quinn)"

=== Later life ===
After New Frontier closed down, Kennedy "left for the United States to pursue an advertising career," while "continuing to publish reviews and witty verse pseudonymously" "In 1942 he moved to a Chicago agency and [also] freelanced as a book reviewer for the Chicago Sun."

Kennedy spent the rest of his working life as a copywriter in the United States, eventually settling in Norwalk, Connecticut, where he served as a staff writer for Reader's Digest.

The Shrouding "was reprinted in 1975 with an introduction by Leon Edel, who described Kennedy as the sprightly leader of Canada's ‘graveyard school’ of metaphysical poetry." Kennedy's "short story ‘A priest in the family’, first published in The Canadian Forum (April 1933), was reprinted in Great stories of the world (1972)."

In 1976 Kennedy "returned to his literary friends in Montreal," where he lived for ten years with his daughter-in-law. There "he worked on literary memoirs he was not to finish," spending his time writing "poems for children, satiric verse, and broadsides."

Kennedy eventually retired "to a hotel in Pasadena, California." He reportedly died in 2000.

== Writing ==
Kennedy's "one volume, The Shrouding (1933, rpt. 1975), reveals the modernist influence of T.S. Eliot and A.J.M. Smith; traditional in form, metaphysical in technique and motif." The poetry is "marked by a fascination with death and symbolic resurrection." "Under the influence of the metaphysical and mythic sensibilities of T.S. Eliot and Sir James Frazer, [Kennedy] wrote poems that sought salvation from the winter wasteland of death and oblivion by fusing Christian faith in the resurrection with the myth of renewal found in the order of nature: buried bones are like crocus bulbs awaiting the spring to sprout heavenward."

Kennedy later repudiated the poems of his first book, as "too unengaged with social issues." "By 1936, when his poems were included in the modernist anthology New Provinces, he was already turning his back on much of what he began, writing committed criticism of social realities for radical periodicals"

In a New Frontier article called "Direction for Canadian Poets," Leo "Kennedy pointed to the impotence of members of the McGill group because they were still preoccupied with the concerns of the twenties. Kennedy's article ends by describing a type of poetry that only came to prominence a decade later:"

we need poetry that reflects the lives of our people, working, loving, fighting, groping for clarity. We need satire - fierce, scorching, aimed at the abuses which are destroying our culture and which threatens life itself. Our poets have lacked direction for their talents and energies in the past — I suggest that today it lies right before them.

== Books, Stories ==
- The Shrouding. Macmillan, Toronto 1933; Golden Dog, Ottawa 1975
- Sunset in the States. Diane, 1972
- in German, transl. Marta Hackel: Ein Priester in der Familie, (A priest in the family) engl.: Canadian Forum, April 1933; german: 89 Autoren erzählen. Die schönsten Kurzgeschichten aus aller Welt. vol. 1, Reader's Digest (=Das Beste), Stuttgart 1974 ISBN 3870700629 pp 261–269
