= Anne Marriott =

Canadian writer (1913–1997)

- Born: Joyce Anne Marriott; November 5, 1913; Victoria, British Columbia
- Died: October 10, 1997 (aged 83); Vancouver, British Columbia
- Occupation: Writer
- Writing career
- Language: English
- Genre: Poetry
- Notable work: The Wind Our Enemy
- Notable awards: Governor General's Award

Anne Marriott (November 5, 1913 – October 10, 1997) was a Canadian writer who won the Governor General's Award for her book Calling Adventurers! "She was renowned especially for the narrative poem The Wind, Our Enemy," which she wrote while still in her twenties.

== Life ==
Because of The Wind Our Enemy, Marriott is often thought to be from one of Canada's prairie provinces. In fact she was born and raised in Victoria, British Columbia (the daughter of Catherine Heley and Edward Guy Marriott), and lived most of her life in that province. As a girl she spent several summers with relatives on a farm in Saskatchewan, which formed the basis of experience for many of her earlier poems.

Marriott took creative writing classes at the University of British Columbia. She was active in British Columbia's literary community as "a productive poet and poetry-educator in the 1940s." She served on the editorial board of Contemporary Verse, which she founded with Dorothy Livesay, Floris McLaren, Doris Ferne and Alan Crawley in 1941.

In 1945, Marriott moved to Ottawa and worked as an editor for the National Film Board. After marrying Gerald McLellan in 1947, Marriott returned with him to British Columbia, where they adopted and raised three children.

Marriott worked as a script writer from 1945 to 1949, a reporter and editor from 1950 to 1953 and an assistant librarian from 1953 to 1958.

Marriott remained active in the literary community and prepared multiple scripts for the CBC. Following the 1974 death of her husband, she became involved in producing poetry workshops for young people.

In the 1980s, Marriott published multiple volumes of poetry and a volume of short stories.

Marriott died in Vancouver following a stroke.

== Poetry ==
Marriott is perhaps best known for her "spectacular" long poem, 'The Wind Our Enemy, which she wrote in her twenties. The Wind Our Enemy, chronicles the devastation of drought on the Canadian prairies during the 1930s. It is seen as a modernist classic, utilizing "the most vital elements of the modern tradition." It "is episodic and documentary rather than strictly narrative in form." It uses "heavy alliteration and repeated sound patterns" in place of rhyme and rhythm. Its ten "sections develop in a mosaic made up of compressed details and dramatized speech. In its colloquial rhythms and its concrete language, the poem expressed for a generation of readers the inarticulate suffering of the prairie farmer who saw his land and his hopes blowing away in a cloud of dust."

The poems of Calling Adventurers! were originally written as choruses for a CBC documentary, "Payload," that in Marriott's words "celebrated the romance and heroism of the northern 'bush flyer' in the era leading up to World War II."

Marriott published two other books of poetry in the 1940s. "Both Salt Marsh (1942) and Sandstone and Other Poems (1945) contain some vigorous and effective lyrics inspired by prairie scenes. 'Woodyards in the Rain' and 'Prairie Graveyard,' for example, display ... intense feeling." Sandstone and Other Poems was her "best-known collection."

In The Circular Coast: Poems New and Selected (1981), "the west coast landscape is symbolically identified with the body as the poet seeks, in images which are at once precise and complex, to come to terms with the problems of aging, loneliness, and death."

In 1985's Letters from Some Islands, "the poems are about journeys in space and time. Landscapes both strange and familiar are here transformed into metaphors for the aging body."

== Honours and awards ==
- 1941 Governor General's Award for Calling Adventurers!
- 1943 Women's Canadian Club Literary Award
- 1956 Koerner Foundation scholarship
- 1958 Ohio Award for Educational Broadcasting

== Publications ==
=== Poetry collections ===
- The Wind Our Enemy, Toronto: Ryerson Press, 1939.
- Calling Adventurers!, Toronto: Ryerson Press, 1941.
- Salt Marsh, Toronto: Ryerson Press, 1942.
- Sandstone and Other Poems, Toronto: Ryerson Press, 1945.
- Countries, Fredericton, NB: Fiddlehead Poetry Books, 1971.
- A Swarming in My Mind, with Joyce Moller. Curriculum Services, 1977.
- This West Shore, Toronto: League of Canadian Poets, 1981.
- The Circular Coast: Poems New and Selected, Oakville, ON: Mosaic Press, 1981.
- Letters from Some Island: New Poems, Oakville, ON: Mosaic Press, 1986.
- Aqua, Toronto: Wolsak & Wynn, 1991.

=== Fiction collections ===
- A Long Way to Oregon: Selected Short Stories, Oakville, ON: Mosaic Press, 1984. ISBN 0-88962-240-X
  - Excerpt, in German: An einem Sonntagnachmittag, transl. Gerhard Böttcher, in Die weite Reise. Kanadische Erzählungen und Kurzgeschichten. Volk und Welt, Berlin 1974, pp 384 – 393

Except where noted, bibliographic information courtesy Brock University.
