= Estonian poetry =

Estonian Poetry is poetry written in the Estonian language or in Estonia.

== History ==
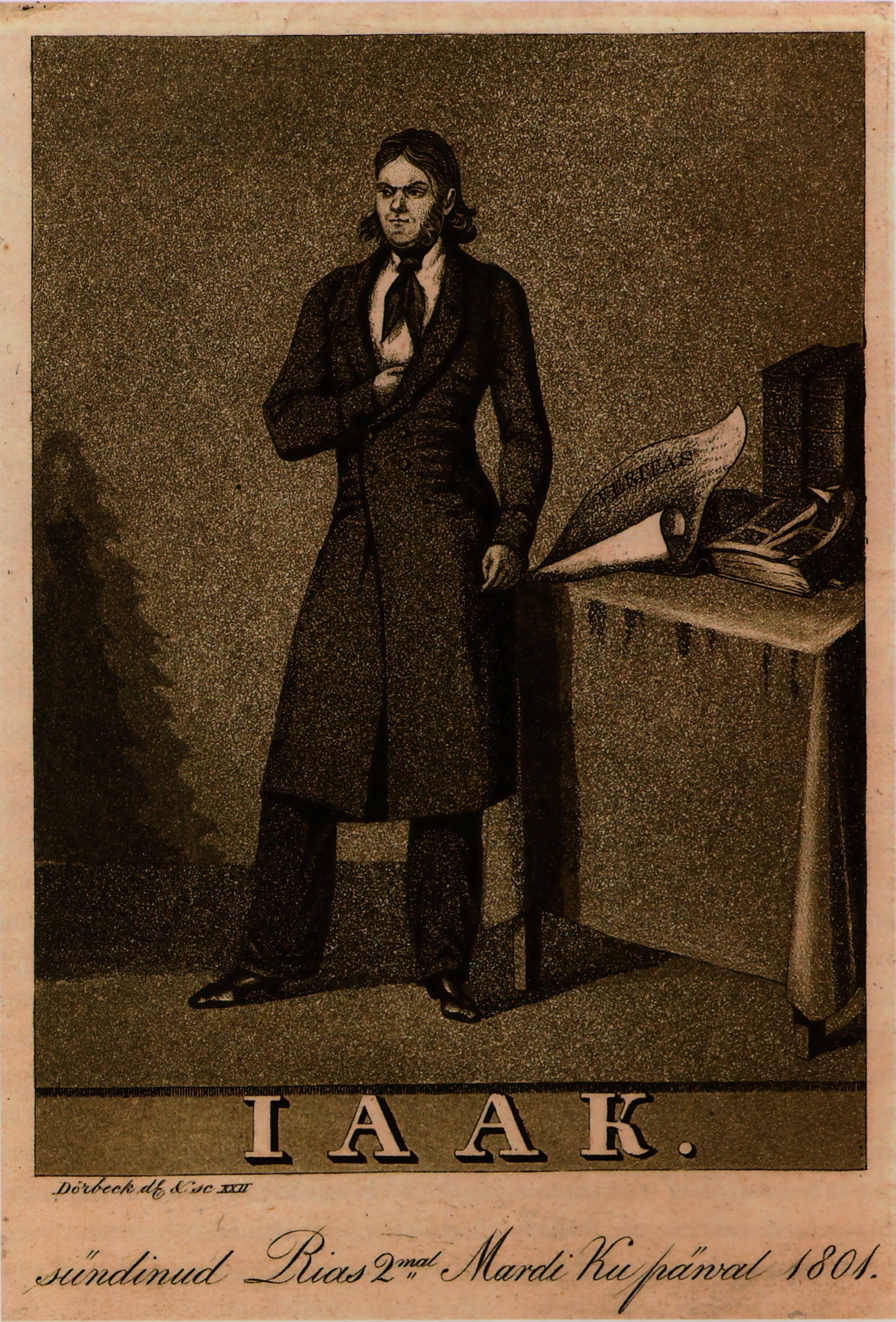
A portrait of Kristjan Jaak Peterson

The earliest known poetry written in Estonia was in the Latin language. The first poems written in the Estonian language came from Baltic German estophiles. The development of Estonian poetry occurred during the time of the Noor-Eesti ("Young Estonia") movement.

Kristjan Jaak Peterson (1801–1822) is commonly regarded as one of the founders of Estonian poetry. Following him, the heyday of national romantic poetry took over as the most prominent examples of Estonian poetry led by poets like Lydia Koidula.

== See also ==
- Estonian haiku
