= Claire Pratt =

Canadian artist, poet and editor

Mildred Claire Pratt
- Born: 13 March 1921; Toronto, Ontario, Canada
- Died: 5 April 1995 (aged 74); Toronto, Ontario, Canada
- Known for: Printmaker, Writer, Editor

Mildred Claire Pratt (18 March 1921 – 5 April 1995) was a Canadian artist, poet and editor who published her work as Claire Pratt.

== Biography ==
Pratt was born in Toronto, Ontario on March 18, 1921, the only daughter of Viola Whitney, an editor of the magazine World Friends, and poet E. J. Pratt.

Pratt contracted polio at the age of 4 and later developed osteomyelitis, an inflammatory disease of the bone. This affected her for most of her life.

She received degrees in English and Philosophy from Victoria College, University of Toronto, with a gold medal. She then studied international relations at Columbia University, and art at the Boston Museum of Fine Art among other schools. She went on to become an editor for Macmillan Canada, the University of Toronto Press, and Harvard University Press, and a senior editor at McClelland & Stewart from 1956 to 1965. She retired due to her health issues in 1964, although continued to freelance for various publishing houses. She continued her art studies in Toronto and Massachusetts. She published Silent Ancestors in 1971. This genealogical essay is a tribute to the descendants of the Pratt family, originally from Yorkshire, who settled in Newfoundland.

Pratt's art consisted largely of woodcuts, and there were exhibitions of her graphic art across North America and in Europe. Her interest in Japanese graphics stimulated an interest in haiku. Her work in this style was widely published, often with her own illustrations. Her work was also inspired by her father's poetry, and she use excerpts from his poems in many of her Christmas cards. She also explored the themes and imagery of E. J. Pratt's work in various works.
