= Last spike (Canadian Pacific Railway) =

1885 ceremony celebrating the completion of Canada's first transcontinental railway

Coordinates: 50°58′31″N 118°43′25″W

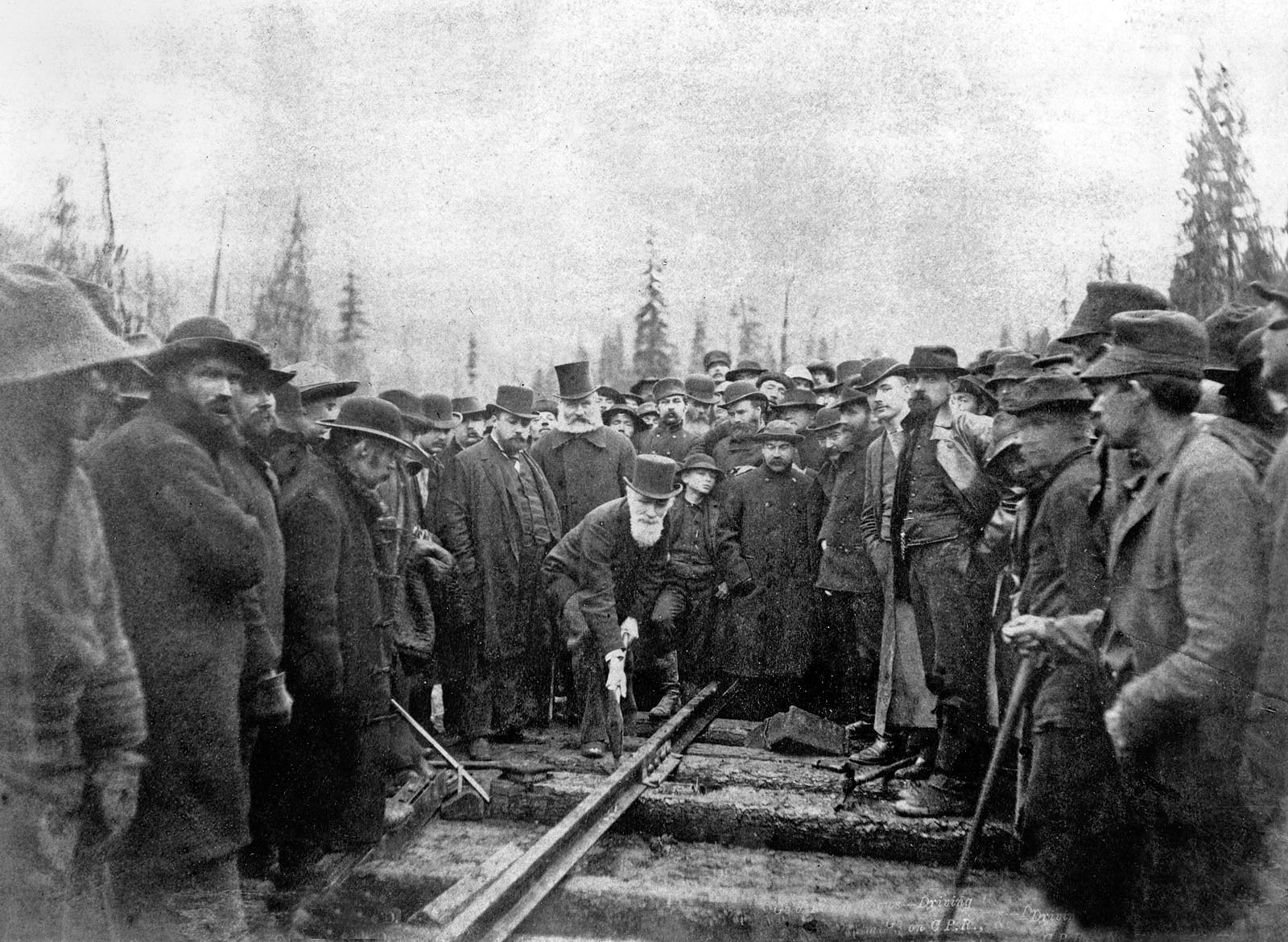
Donald Smith drives in the last spike

A ceremonial final spike was driven into the Canadian Pacific Railway (CPR) at Craigellachie, British Columbia, at 9:22 am on November 7, 1885. It was driven in by CPR railway financier Donald Smith, Baron Strathcona and Mount Royal, marking the end to a saga of natural disasters, financial crises, and even rebellion that plagued Canada's first transcontinental railway from its beginning.

== Background to completion of the railway ==
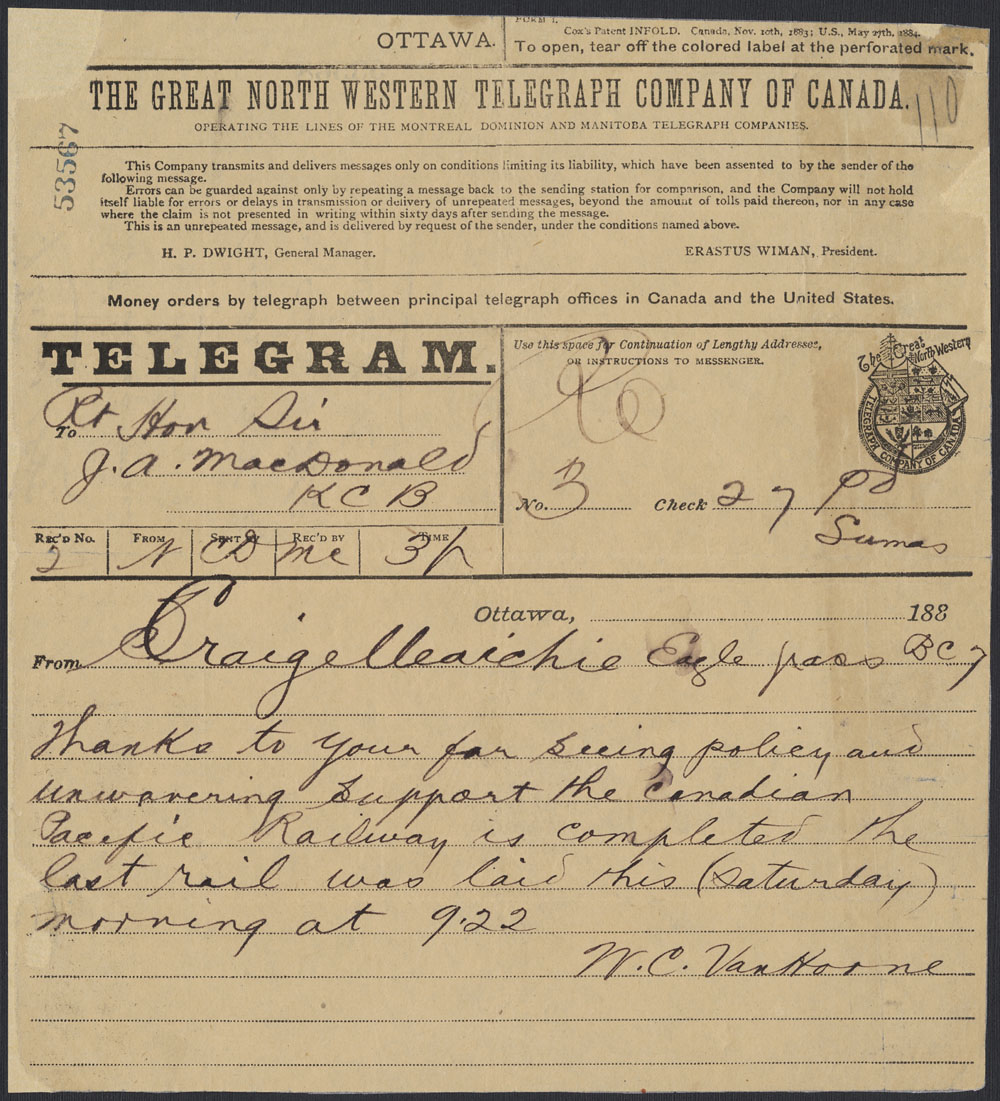
Telegram to Prime Minister John A. Macdonald announcing the completion of the Canadian Pacific Railway, November 7, 1885

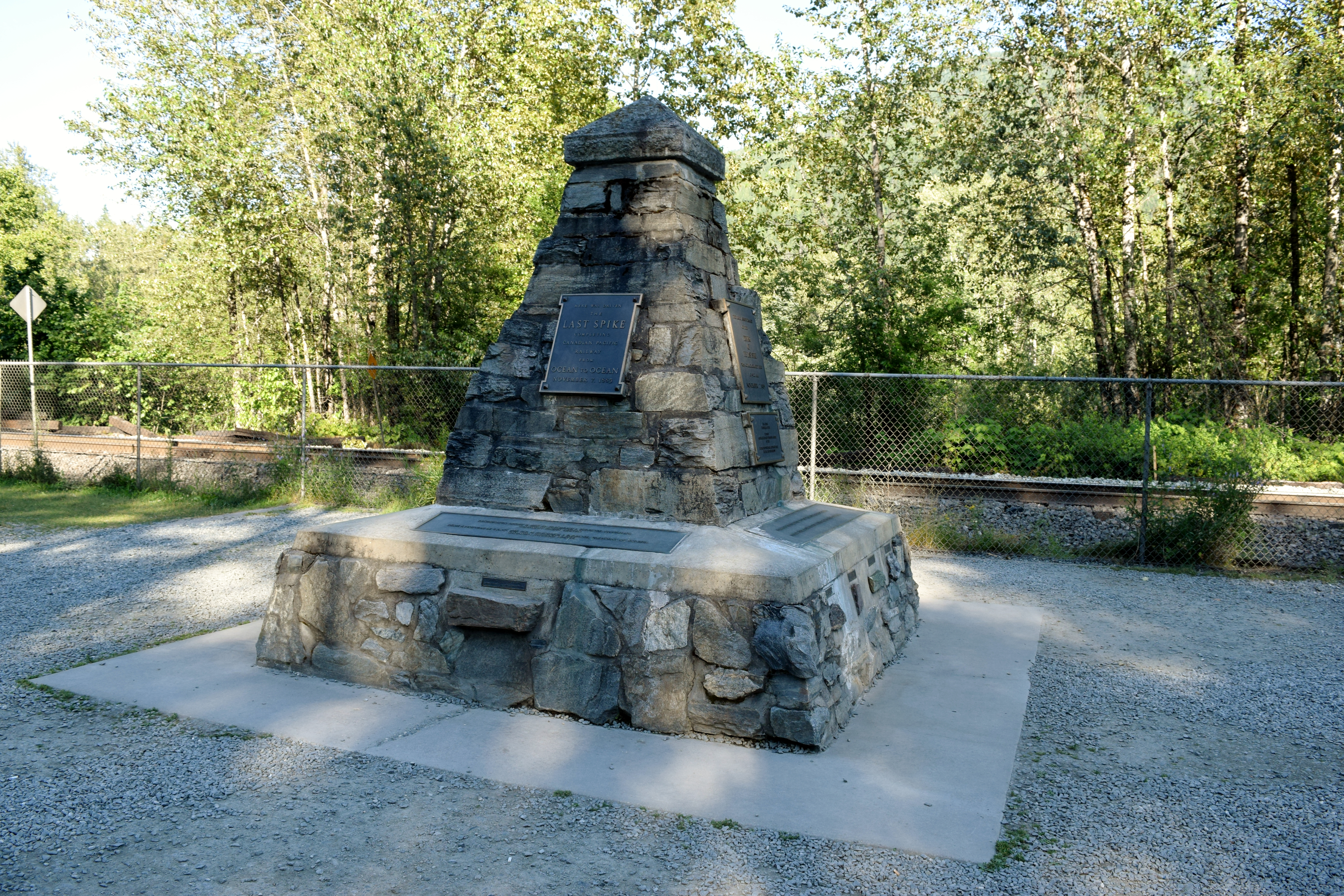
Last spike monument

The driving-in of the last spike under engineer James Ross signalled the completion of the CPR. It remains a symbol of national unity in Canada, though due to the need to build protective snowsheds in Rogers Pass and Kicking Horse Pass in addition to the actual rails and roadbed, through trains did not run until June 1886. At the time, the railway's completion fulfilled an 1871 commitment made by the Canadian federal government to British Columbia that a railway be built joining the Pacific province to Central Canada. The promise of a transcontinental railway had been a major factor in British Columbia's decision to join the Canadian Confederation. However, successive governments mismanaged the project and by the original deadline of 1881 little of the railway had been completed, resulting in threats of secession by some BC politicians. The work was then assigned to a newly incorporated CPR company, which was allowed an additional ten years to complete the line, and they did it in five.

The contribution of Chinese labourers during this project is largely overlooked. In fact, no Chinese person is seen in the "Last Spike" photo.

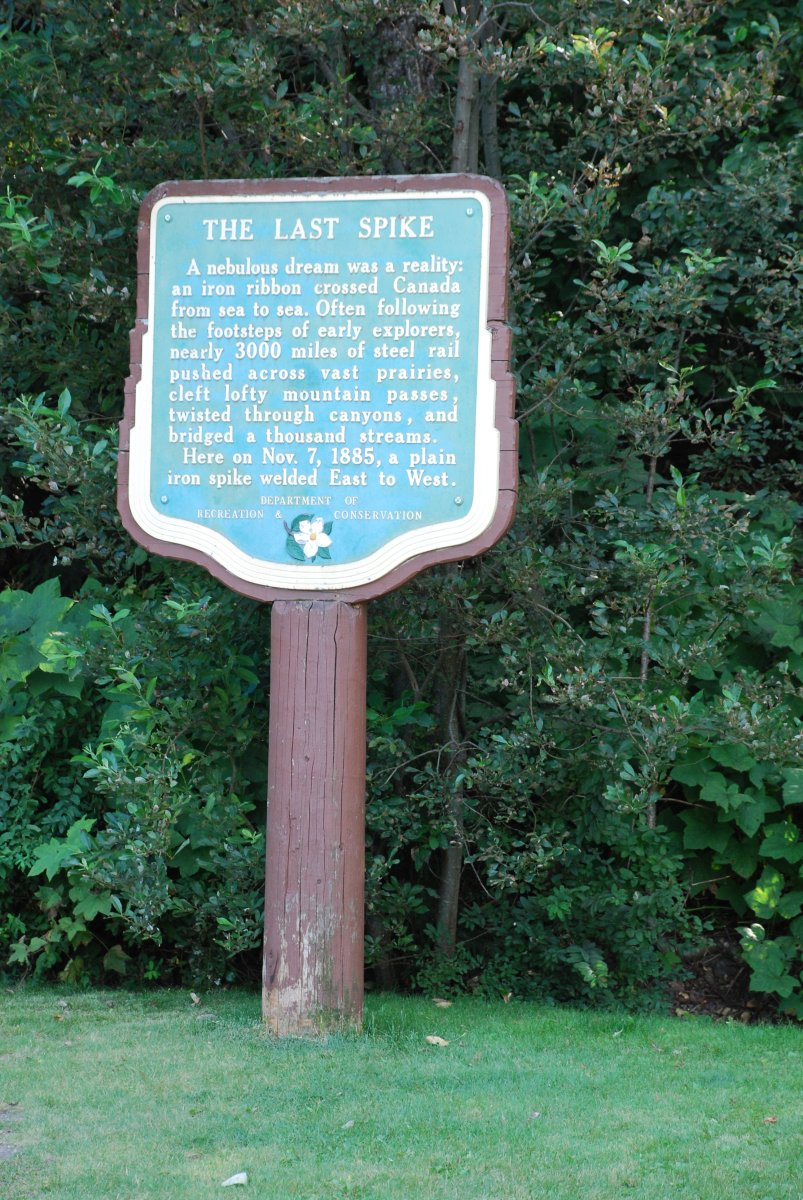
A plaque commemorating the driving of the last spike

== "Last spike" artifacts ==
The circumstance of the CPR's last spike ceremony led several spikes to assume the honour of being the "last spike". In contrast to the ceremonial gold or silver final spikes often used to mark the completion of other major railways, the CPR's "last spike" was a conventional iron spike identical to the many others used in the construction of the line. A silver spike had been created for the Governor General, the Marquess of Lansdowne, who was to be present at the ceremony, but he was forced by poor weather to return with the spike to Ottawa, Ontario. The silver spike remained with the Van Horne family until 2012, when they donated it, along with other artifacts, to the Canadian Museum of Civilization in Gatineau, Quebec.

The symbolic iron spike driven by Donald Smith, Baron Strathcona and Mount Royal, was badly bent as he pounded it into the railway tie. Roadmaster Frank Brothers extracted the spike and it was given to Smith as the "last spike". Smith had the bent spike straightened and cut several strips of iron from it, which were fashioned to appear as miniature railway spikes mounted with 13 diamonds and a circular piece of the original spike at the centre. These were presented to the wives of some of the party assembled at Craigellachie. This spike was later donated to the Canada Science and Technology Museum in Ottawa and is on long-term loan to the Canadian Museum of Immigration at Pier 21 in Halifax, Nova Scotia, where it is displayed as a tribute to the immigrant railway workers who were critical to the railway's construction.

Smith later used another iron spike, usually called "the ordinary" or "fourth spike", to provide iron to make symbolic jewelry for the wives of other officials. With this iteration, he made the strips larger to distinguish these souvenirs from the original brooches. Four of the pins are known to exist today. That which was presented to the railways' president, George Stephen, was donated to Canada's Crown Collection by one of Stephen's descendants. The governor general or the viceregal consort will wear the Crown Collection's pin for special events, signifying an event that helped tie the young country together.

The second last spike, which Smith successfully drove into the tie, was removed from the track shortly after the ceremony to prevent theft by souvenir hunters. A regular spike was inserted in its place. This spike was given to the son of the patent office president at the time and is still in the family's possession, fashioned into the shape of a carving knife.

The now-famous photograph of Smith driving in the CPR's last spike was taken by Winnipeg photographer Alexander J. Ross.

== In popular culture ==
The most notable accounts of the construction and completion of the CPR are Pierre Berton's twin volumes The National Dream and The Last Spike, which together are depicted in the Canadian television docudrama miniseries The National Dream, an eight-part series that premiered in 1974, whose rated audience of three million within Canada set a record for CBC in terms of dramatic programming.

Another recollection of this event is the narrative poem entitled Towards the Last Spike by E. J. Pratt.

A board game published under the name The Last Spike had the financing and construction of a trans-Canadian railway as its object.

A previous version (prior to 2023) of the Canadian passport features the last spike (French: le dernier crampon) on pages 10 and 11, along with the Ross photograph of Smith.

== See also ==
- Canadian Pacific Railway in British Columbia
- Golden spike, 1869 completion of the United States transcontinental railroad
- Last Spike (Grand Trunk Pacific Railway)
- Towards the Last Spike (poem)
