= Arthur Bourinot =

Canadian poet

Captain Arthur Stanley Bourinot SM, DCL, FRSL
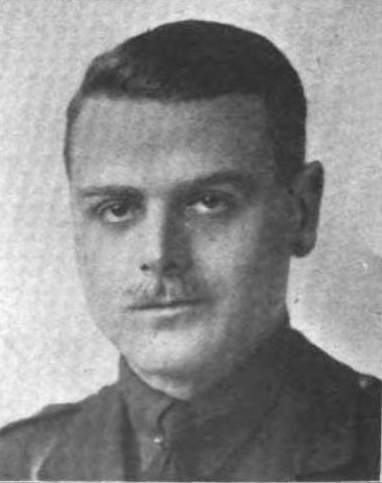
- Born: Arthur Stanley Bourinot; November 3, 1893; Ottawa, Ontario
- Died: January 17, 1969 (aged 75)
- Citizenship: Canadian
- Occupation: Lawyer
- Relatives: Sir John George Bourinot, father John George Bourinot, grandfather
- Writing career
- Genre: Poetry
- Notable work: Under the Sun
- Notable awards: Governor General's Award

Arthur Stanley Bourinot, SM (November 3, 1893 – January 17, 1969) was a Canadian lawyer, scholar, and poet. "His carefully researched historical and biographical books and articles on Canadian poets, such as Duncan Campbell Scott, Archibald Lampman, George Frederick Cameron, William E. Marshall and Charles Sangster, have made a valuable contribution to the field of literary criticism in Canada."

== Life ==
Arthur Bourinot was born in Ottawa, Ontario, the son of Lady Isabelle and Sir John George Bourinot. He was educated at Ottawa Collegiate Institute, and University College, Toronto. Graduating in 1915, he found a position as a civil servant in Canada's Department of Indian Affairs, but almost immediately took a leave of absence to serve in World War I. He enlisted with the 77th Battalion CEF (Governor General's Foot Guards) and served overseas with the 87th Battalion (Canadian Grenadier Guards), CEF in the Canadian Army and later with Royal Flying Corps (later the Royal Air Force). He was a prisoner of war in 1917 and 1918, held in camps at Karlsruhe, Freiburg and Holzminden.

After the war, Bourinot received his legal training from Osgoode Hall Law School. He was called to the Ontario Bar in 1920. He practiced law in Ottawa until retiring in 1959.

Bourinot began publishing poetry as an undergraduate, and brought out his first book, the slim 24-poem Laurentian Lyrics and Other Poems in December, 1915. The Encyclopedia of Literature has called him "a deft versifier enthralled with the beauty of nature, the major subject of both his poems and his paintings." Confederation Poet Duncan Campbell Scott was his close friend and mentor.

Bourinot's verse was at first traditional with little experimentation, but by Under the Sun (1939) was showing "a new versatility in its terse rhythms and free verse, and in its frank poems about the Depression and the coming war." Under the Sun won the Governor General's Award for English language poetry or drama in 1939.

Bourinot edited the Canadian Poetry Magazine from 1948 to 1954 and from 1966 to 1968. He was editor of Canadian Author and Bookman from 1953 to 1954, and an associate editor from 1957 to 1960. During that period he began to edit and privately publish volumes of the correspondence of Scott, Lampman, and Edward William Thomson. He was also a judge and editor of the Alberta Poetry Year Book in 1940.

== Publications ==
=== Poetry ===
- Laurentian Lyrics and Other Poems. Toronto: Copp Clark, 1915.
- Poems (Toronto: T.H. Best, 1921)
- Lyrics from the hills (1923)
- Pattering Feet: A book of childhood verses. Ottawa: Graphic Publishers, 1925.
- Ottawa Lyrics and verses for children (1929)
- Selected Poems (1915–1935) (1935)
- Under the Sun (1939)
- Canada at Dieppe. Toronto: Ryerson, 1942.
- True Harvest (1945)
- The Collected Poems of Arthur S. Bourinot (Toronto: Ryerson Press, 1947)
- Paul Bunyan, Three Lincoln Poems, and Other Verse. Ottawa: Arthur S. Bourinot, 1961.
- Watcher of Men: selected poems (1947–66). Ottawa: Arthur S. Bourinot, 1966.

=== Prose ===
- Five Canadian poets. Montreal: Quality Press, 1954. rev. Arthur S. Bourinot, 1956.
- T (1955)

=== Edited ===
- Rhymes of the French Regime. Toronto: Nelson, 1937.
- Come a Singing! Canadian Folk Songs. Arthur S. Bourinot & Marius Barbeau ed. Arthur Lismer illus. Ottawa: National Museum of Canada, 1947.
- Edward William Thomson (1849–1924): a bibliography, with notes and some letters (1955)
- Archibald Lampman's Letters to Edward William Thomson (1890-1898). Ottawa: Bourinot, 1956.
- The letters of Edward William Thomson to Archibald Lampman (1891– 97) (1957)
- At the Mermaid Inn, Conducted by A. Lampman, W. W. Campbell, Duncan C. Scott. [Essays having appeared in the Toronto Globe, 1892-93. Ottawa: Bourinot, 1958.
- Some Letters of Duncan Campbell Scott, Archibald Lampman, and Others. Ottawa: Bourinot, 1959.
- More Letters of Duncan Campbell Scott. Ottawa: Arthur S. Bourinot, 1960.

Except where noted, bibliographic information is courtesy the Encyclopedia of Literature.
