= Estonian haiku =

Poetic form

Estonian haiku (Estonian: Eesti haiku) is a short poem in Estonian that has adopted the form and style of the original Japanese haiku. Estonian haiku was first introduced in 2009. The so-called "Estonian haiku" is shorter than the Japanese one; the syllable count in Japanese haiku is 5+7+5, while Estonian haiku also goes in three lines but only comprises 4+6+4 syllables. Estonian authors claim that this is a distinctively Estonian form.

== History ==
Traditional haiku have been developed in Estonia since 1960s. Andres Ehin (1940–2011) was the most prominent Estonian-language haiku writer of the 20th century; his bilingual English-Estonian collection Moose Beetle Swallow was published in Ireland in 2005. Estonian poets Arvo Mets and Felix Tammi wrote haiku in Russian.

Asko Künnap is credited as the inventor of Estonian haiku. The first collection of Estonian haiku was published in 2010: Estonian Haiku by poets Asko Künnap , Jürgen Rooste, and Karl Martin Sinijärv. An Estonian-language haiku competition was organized at the 2011 Helsinki Book Fair where Estonia was the guest of honor. A selection of Estonian haiku has been published by the Estonian Writers' Union's magazine Looming ("Creation"). Estonian haiku have been actively translated into Finnish.
