= Laura Salverson =

Canadian author (1890 – 1970)

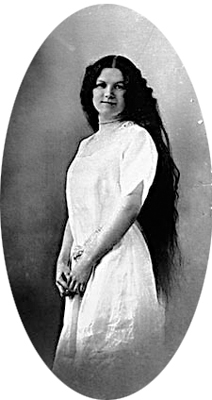
- Born: Laura Goodman; December 9, 1890; Winnipeg, Manitoba
- Died: July 13, 1970 (aged 79); Toronto, Ontario
- Writing career
- Genre: Novel

Laura Goodman Salverson (December 9, 1890 – July 13, 1970) was a Canadian author. Her work reflected her Icelandic heritage. Two of her books won Governor General's awards for literature.

== Early life ==
Salverson was born Laura Goodman in Winnipeg, Manitoba, the daughter of Lárus Guðmundsson and Ingibjörg Guðmundsdóttir who immigrated to Winnipeg in 1887 from Grundir in Bolungarvík, Iceland. She married George Salverson in 1913.

== Career ==
While a young housewife and mother, Salverson began writing poetry. Several of her poems were published by local newspapers.

In 1923, Salverson published her first novel. The Viking Heart. She went on to write several novels based on Icelandic sagas and themes. Many of the characters in her stories were Scandinavian and German.

Salverson wrote about her experiences with poverty and racial prejudice. Her writings reflected her belief that Icelandic immigrants to Canada should maintain and support their Icelandic culture. In 1939, she wrote an autobiography.

== Works ==
- The Viking Heart (1923)
- When Sparrows Fall (1925)
- Wayside Gleams (1925)
- Lord of the Silver Dragons (1927)
- The Dove (1933)
- The Dark Weaver: Against the Sombre Background of the Old Generations Flame the Scarlet Banners of the New (1937), winner of a 1937 Governor General's Award
- Black Lace (1938)
- Confessions of an Immigrant's Daughter (1939), winner of a 1939 Governor General's Award
- Immortal Rock: The Saga of the Kensington Stone (1954), winner of the 1954 Ryerson Fiction Award
