= 1941 Governor General's Awards =

Canadian literary award

The 1941 Governor General's Awards for Literary Merit were the sixth rendition of the Governor General's Awards, Canada's annual national awards program which then comprised literary awards alone. The awards recognized Canadian writers for new English-language works published in Canada during 1941 and were presented in 1942. There were no cash prizes.

There was one award in each of three established categories, which recognized English-language works only.

== Winners ==
- Fiction: Alan Sullivan, Three Came to Ville Marie
- Poetry or drama: Anne Marriott, Calling Adventurers!
- Non-fiction: Emily Carr, Klee Wyck
