= Saqi Farooqi =

Pakistani poet (1936–2018)

- ساقی فاروقی
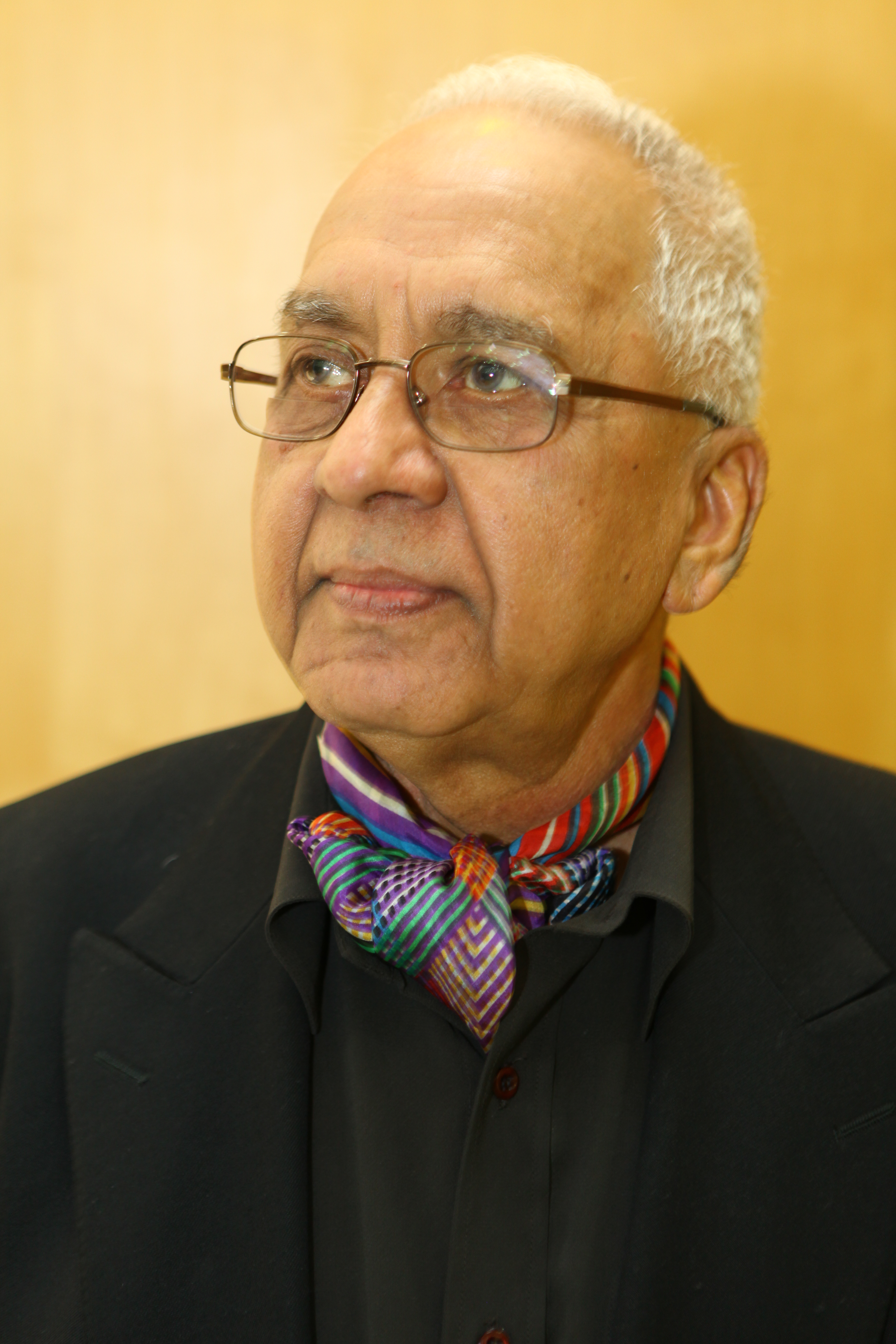
- Born: 21 December 1936; Gorakhpur, India
- Died: 19 January 2018 (aged 81); London
- Known for: Poetry

Qazi Muhammad Shamshad Nabi Farooqi, better known by his pen-name Saqi Farooqi (Urdu: ساقی فاروقی), was a British-Pakistani poet who wrote in both Urdu and English.

Best known for his modernist Urdu poetry, mostly ghazals and nazms, he authored critical essays as well.

His famous Urdu works include Behram Ki Wapsi and Razoon Se Bhara Basta. He also wrote in English, including Nailing Dark Storm, a collection of English poems.

== Early life ==
Saqi was born on 21 December 1936 in Gorakhpur in Uttar Pradesh, British India. His family migrated from India to East Pakistan and then to Karachi, Pakistan. He completed his intermediate in science from the Urdu College and later graduated from the Karachi University.

He went from Pakistan to London and made an influence in English poetry.

== Died ==
Farooqi died on 19 January 2018 at the age of 81 in London.
