= Marie McPhedran =

Canadian writer (1900–1974)

- Born: Marie Willard Green; October 29, 1900; Sault Ste. Marie, Ontario
- Died: September 1, 1974 (aged 73); Toronto, Ontario
- Occupations: Writer (novelist, short stories)
- Spouse(s): Gordon George Duncan (m. 1927; died 1932) Harris McPhedran (m. 1936; died 1963)
- Writing career
- Period: 20th century
- Genres: History, fiction

Marie Green Duncan McPhedran (October 29, 1900 – September 1, 1974) was a Canadian novelist and writer of short stories for children. Her book Cargoes on the Great Lakes won the 1952 Governor General's Awards for juvenile fiction.

== Biography ==
McPhedran was born as Marie Willard Green in Sault Ste. Marie in 1900. She attended the University of Toronto in 1921 but left before finishing her degree to help put her brothers through university. In 1927 she married Gordon George Duncan, a mining engineer. She and her husband settled in Flin Flon, Manitoba. McPhedran was one of the first women to live there, and it was through her experiences there she drew on to begin writing. Her husband died in 1932 due to kidney failure. She was left alone to raise her daughter, Kittie-Marie.

She married again in 1936 to Harris McPhedran, a medical doctor. She relocated to Toronto where McPhedran was practicing medicine. By the time of her second marriage she had already started to write and had published a short story about her experiences in the north. Over the next decade she wrote a large number of short stories for children but had difficulty finding publishers. Her breakthrough came with her first novel, Golden North, the runner-up for the 1948 Governor-General's Award for juvenile fiction. Other books followed, including Cargoes on the Great Lakes, for which she won the 1952 Governor-General's Award. Later she began work on a biography of Jeanne Mance, but never completed it. She died on 1 September 1974.

== Works ==
- Golden North, (1948)
- Cargoes of the Great Lakes, (1952)
