= Craigellachie, British Columbia =

Craigellachie
- Location within British Columbia
- Coordinates: 50°58′31″N 118°43′25″W
- Country: Canada
- Province: British Columbia
- Region: BC Interior
- Regional district: Columbia-Shuswap Regional District
- Land district: Kamloops Division Yale Land District
- Time zone: UTC−07:00 (PT)
- Postal code span: V0E 2J0
- Area code: 250 / 778 / 236
- Highways: Trans-Canada Highway

Craigellachie (pronounced /krəˈɡɛləxi, -hi/) is a locality in British Columbia, located several kilometres to the west of the Eagle Pass summit between Sicamous and Revelstoke. Craigellachie is the site of a tourist stop on the Trans-Canada Highway between Salmon Arm and Revelstoke.

It was named after the village of Craigellachie on the River Spey in Moray, Scotland, the ancestral home of Sir George Stephen, the first president of the Canadian Pacific Railway (CPR). At a critical time in the railway's development, Stephen travelled to Britain to raise desperately needed capital funding; when he succeeded, he telegraphed his associates in Canada quoting the familiar motto of Clan Grant: "Stand fast, Craigellachie!"

The Canadian Craigellachie is most famous for being the site of the "Last Spike" of the CPR, driven by Sir Donald Smith, a director of the CPR, on November 7, 1885.

== Gallery ==
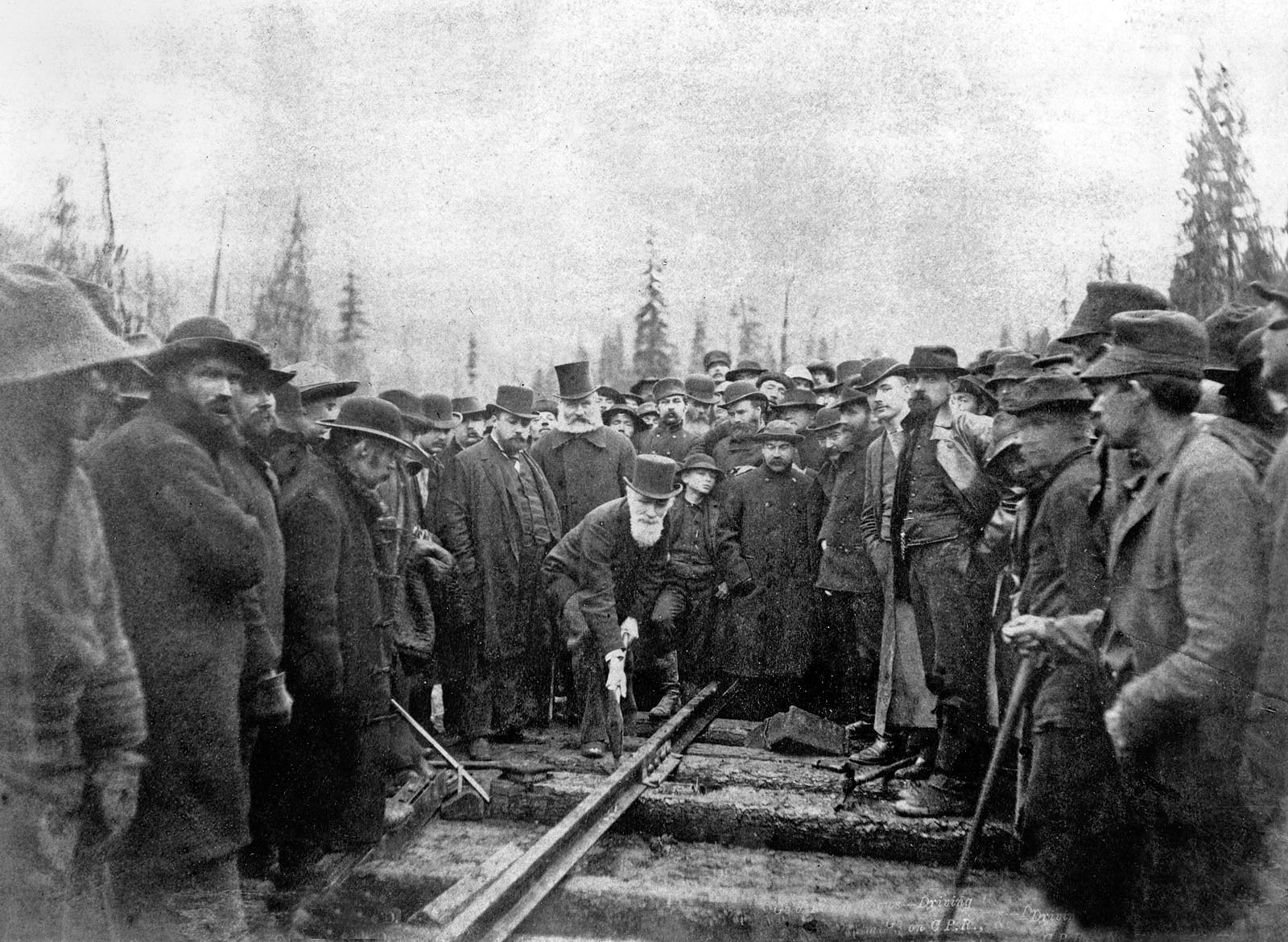
Sir Donald Smith drives the last spike at Craigellachie

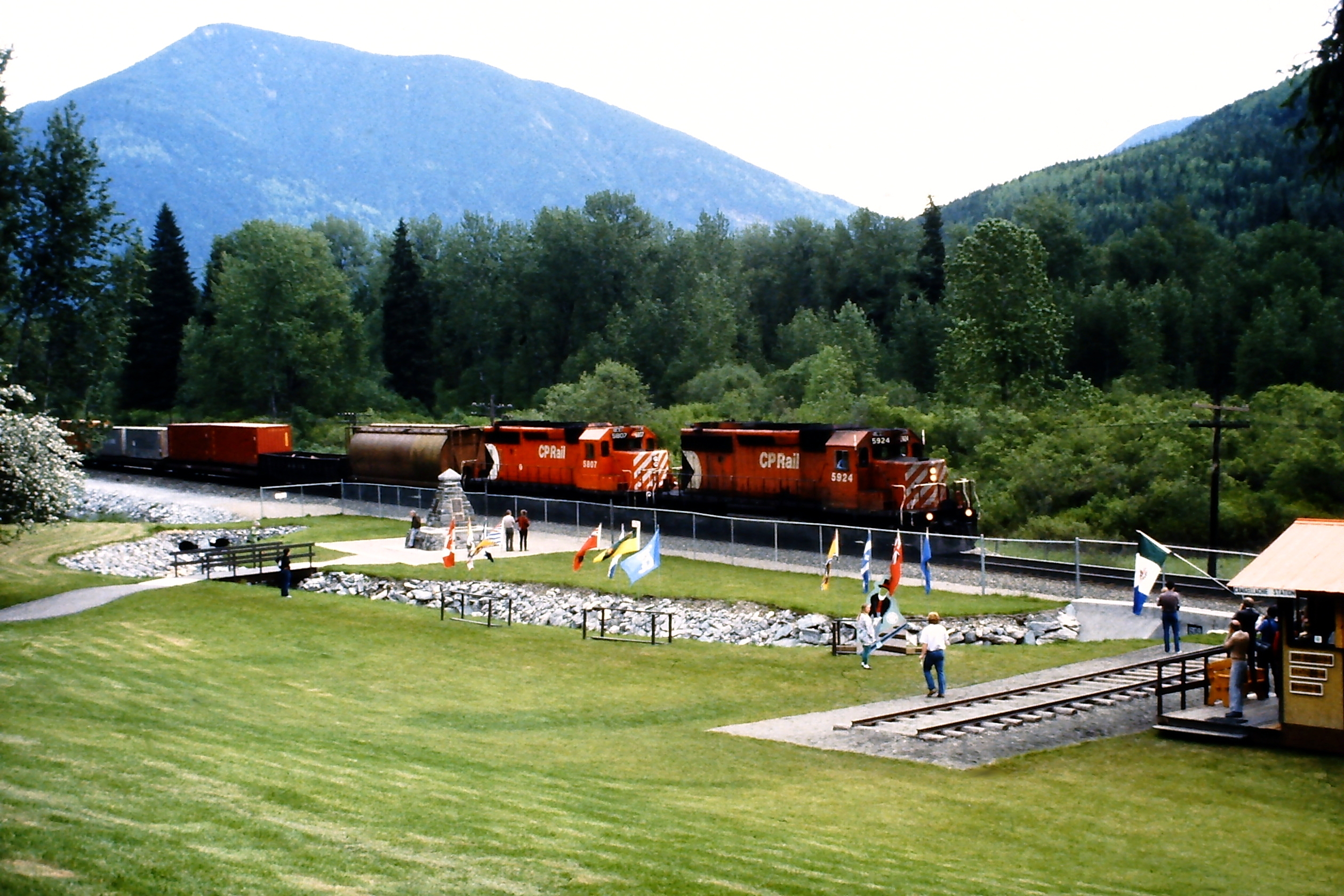
Craigellachie station

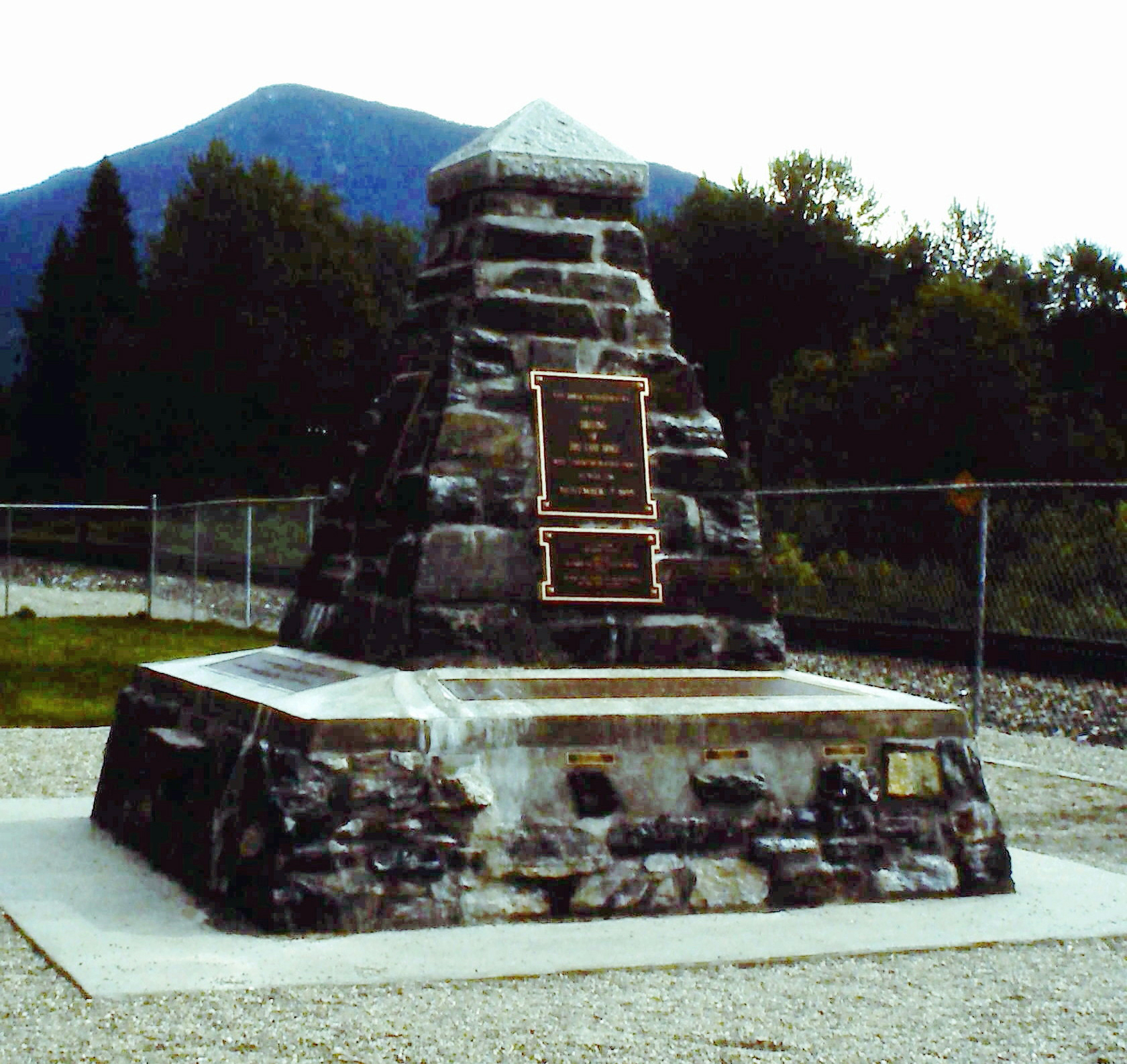
"Last Spike" memorial
