= Neelamperoor Madhusoodanan Nair =

Indian writer (1936–2021)

Neelamperoor Madhusoodanan Nair (25 March 1936 – 2 January 2021) was an Indian poet and writer, from Kerala state, South India, who wrote in the Malayalam–language. He received the Kerala Sahitya Akademi Award in the year 2000 for his work Chamatha. His other works include Ithile Varika, Eettillam, Chitha, Amaram, Urangum Munpu and the humorous Phalitha Chinthakal.
