= Arvo Mets =

Estonian-Russian writer

Arvo Antonovich Mets (Russian: Арво Антонович Метс; 29 April 1937 – 1997) was an Estonian-born Russian poet. He is regarded as a master of Russian free verse. He also translated works of Estonian poets into Russian.

== Biography ==
Arvo Mets was born in Tallinn to an Estonian Orthodox father and a Lutheran mother. Although neither of his parents spoke Russian, he could learn the language on his own. He was educated at the Leningrad Library Institute and later at the Maxim Gorky Literature Institute in Moscow. He lived mostly in Moscow where he edited a few literary magazines. From 1975 to 1991 he worked as an editor for the “New world” magazine (rus. “Новый мир”). Arvo Mets organised poetry reading in the “Taganka” literary club (rus. “На Таганке”). During his lifetime he published four collections of his poems. The book of his selected poems appeared posthumously, in 2006. His works also appeared in the best Russian literary magazines. A number of his poems have been translated into English, Dutch, Hindi, Serbian and other languages.

His complete poems appeared in 2021 in Swedish translation by Alan Asaid: Tallinns stenar. Samlade dikter 1962–1996 (Bokförlaget Faethon).

== A Sample Poem by Arvo Mets ==
Resemblance

Young girls

resemble in looks

the sky,

the wind,

the clouds above.

Later these girls make

devoted wives

whose faces remind us

of houses,

furniture,

carrier bags.

Still, their daughters

resemble in looks

the sky,

the wind

and streamlets in spring.

(translated by Anatoly Kudryavitsky)

== Books ==
- “Swans above Chelny” (an anthology of poems by the members of the “Orpheus” writers group from Naberezhnye Chelny), Moscow, Proceedings Publishers, 1981 (79 pages).
- “Stones of Tallinn”, Moscow, Proceedings Publishers, 1989
- “Annual Rings”, Moscow, Author Publishers, 1992
- “Poems”, Moscow, The State Museum of V. Sidur, 1995
- “In the Forests of Autumn”, Moscow, 2006, no publisher's name, series “Russian verse libre” (276 pages) [ISBN 9789189113572]
- Tallinns stenar (Swedish publisher's homepage)

== Texts in anthologies ==
- “X-Time”, Moscow, 1989
- “The Anthology of Russian Verse Libre”, Moscow, 1991
- "A Night in the Nabokov Hotel: 20 contemporary poets from Russia", Dedalus Press, Dublin, 2006.

== On the Web ==
- Poems of Arvo Mets in English
