= 1937 Governor General's Awards =

Canadian literary award

The 1937 Governor General's Awards for Literary Merit were the second rendition of the Governor General's Awards, Canada's annual national awards program which then comprised literary awards alone. The awards recognized Canadian writers for new English-language works published in Canada during 1937 and were presented in 1938. There were no cash prizes.

Poetry or drama was introduced as a third category alongside the original awards for fiction and non-fiction. There was one award in each, which recognized English-language works only.

== Winners ==
- Fiction: Laura G. Salverson, The Dark Weaver
- Poetry or drama: E. J. Pratt, The Fable of the Goats
- Non-fiction: Stephen Leacock, My Discovery of the West
