= Robert Finch (poet) =

Canadian poet and academic

- Born: Robert Duer Claydon Finch; May 14, 1900; Freeport, Long Island, NY
- Died: June 11, 1995 (age 95)
- Education: University of Toronto, Sorbonne
- Occupation: professor
- Writing career
- Language: English
- Genre: poetry
- Notable works: Poems, Acis in Oxford and Other Poems
- Notable awards: Governor General's Award, Lorne Pierce Medal, FRSC

Robert Duer Claydon Finch (May 14, 1900 – June 11, 1995) was a Canadian poet and academic. He twice won Canada's top literary honor, the Governor General's Award, for his poetry.

== Life ==
Born in Freeport, Long Island, New York, Finch was educated at the University of Toronto and the Sorbonne. He was a professor of French at the University of Toronto for four decades (1928–1968), and an expert on French poetry.

== Writing ==
The Canadian Encyclopedia calls Finch "one of Canada's modernists" in poetry. It adds: "His work, deeply imbued with the classical tradition, is characterized by an intense care for form and graced by a rare subtlety and elegance."

Finch began writing poetry in the early 1920s; "like most of the Canadian Modernists, he wrote much of his best known poetry in the 1930s, when the Depression precluded the real possibility of publication."

In 1936, Finch published eleven poems in the "milestone selection of modernist Canadian verse," New Provinces, edited by F.R. Scott and A.J.M. Smith. "Mr. Finch is an intellectual poet," Smith wrote in 1939. "Of the six contributors to New Provinces, he is the most elegant and the least sensuous. His verse is not without feeling, but the feeling is so carefully husbanded and so fastidiously winnowed that one is impressed with its delicacy and precision rather than with its abundance and strength." Smith included Finch's poetry in his critically praised 1943 anthology, The Book of Canadian Poetry, bringing it to a national audience.

Finch's first book of poetry, Poems, was published in 1946.

== Recognition ==
Finch won the Governor General's Award in 1946 for Poems, and in 1961 for Acis in Oxford and Other Poems.

He was elected a Fellow of the Royal Society of Canada in 1963. The Society awarded him its Lorne Pierce Medal in 1968.

== Publications ==
=== Poetry ===
- New Provinces: Poems of Several Authors. Toronto, Macmillan, 1936. (one of six poets in a collection)
- Poems. Toronto: Oxford U P, 1946.
- The Strength of the Hills. Toronto: McClelland & Stewart, 1948.
- A Century has Roots: a masque performed at Hart House Theatre to commemorate the one hundredth anniversary of the foundation of University College, Toronto, in 1853. Toronto: U of Toronto P, 1953.
- Acis in Oxford and Other Poems. Oxford UK: privately printed at New Bodleian, 1959. Toronto: U of Toronto P, 1961.
- Dover Beach Revisited and Other Poems. Toronto: Macmillan, 1961.
- Silverthorn Bush and Other Poem. Toronto: Macmillan, 1966.
- "Five Sonnets," Tamarack Review 74 (Spring 1978).
- Variations and Theme. Erin, ON: Porcupine's Quill, 1980. ISBN 0-88984-035-0
- Has and Is. Erin, ON: Porcupine's Quill, 1981. ISBN 0-88984-048-2
- Twelve for Christmas. Erin, ON: Porcupine's Quill, 1982. ISBN 0-88984-078-4
- The Grand Duke of Moscow's Favourite Solo. Erin, ON: Porcupine's Quill, 1983. ISBN 0-88984-080-6
- Double Tuning. Erin, ON: Porcupine's Quill, 1984. ISBN 0-88984-065-2
- Sailboat and Lake.. Erin, ON: Porcupine's Quill, 1984. ISBN 0-88984-124-1
- Miracle at the Jetty. Port Rowan, ON: Leeboard P, 1991. ISBN 0-9694604-1-4

=== Prose ===
- The Sixth Sense: Individualism in French Poetry 1686-1760. Toronto: U of Toronto P, 1966.

=== Edited ===
- French Individualist Poetry 1686-1760. Robert Finch & Eugène Joliat ed. Toronto: U of Toronto P, 1971. ISBN 0802052606
