= New Provinces =

1930s book edited by F. R. Scott

New Provinces: Poems of Several Authors
- Title page for New Provinces: Poems of Several Authors (1936)
- Author: F. R. Scott, ed. [anon.]
- Language: English
- Genre: Poetry
- Publisher: Macmillan of Canada
- Publication date: May 11, 1936
- Publication place: Canada

New Provinces: Poems of Several Authors was an anthology of Canadian poetry published in the 1930s, anonymously edited by F. R. Scott assisted by Leo Kennedy and A. J. M. Smith. As the first anthology of Canadian modernist poetry, it has been hailed as a "landmark anthology" and a "milestone selection of modernist Canadian verse".

== History ==
Kennedy, Scott, Smith, and fellow Montreal poet A. M. Klein were all members of the Montreal Group of poets centred on that city's McGill University in the 1920s and early 1930s. Smith and Scott had co-edited the McGill Fortnightly Review; Kennedy and Klein were respectively editors of the Review's successor journals, the Canadian Mercury and the McGilliad. The four poets began assembling an anthology of poetry in 1931, and in 1934 invited Toronto poets Robert Finch and E. J. Pratt to join them.

Scott and Smith disagreed over also inviting Toronto poet Dorothy Livesay. "Smith twice explicitly suggested to Scott that Livesay’s poetry be included in the volume. On both occasions Scott refused, saying that Livesay’s work would be appropriate for a second, 'more political' edition of New Provinces at a later date." (Scott was a founder of the social democratic Co-operative Commonwealth Federation, while Livesay was a member of the Communist Party of Canada.) Much later, though, Livesay told an interviewer that Scott had wanted to include her work, and that it was Pratt who had vetoed it.

There were other disagreements between Scott and Smith. "Smith wanted the volume to offer an up-to-the minute statement on the contributors' work, while Scott wanted it to offer a more historical statement on the development of the contributors' poetry, in hopes of calling forth other, unknown modernist poets-in-the-making."

In line with the anthology he envisioned, Smith penned a Preface in 1934 that was a manifesto of modernism and a rejection of all that had gone before. In Canadian poetry, he mocked, "The most popular experience is to be pained, hurt, stabbed or seared by beauty—preferably by the yellow flame of a crocus in the spring or the red flame of a maple leaf in the autumn." "The fundamental criticism that must be brought against Canadian poetry as a whole," he added, "is that it ignores the intelligence. And as a result it is dead." Scott had trouble reconciling that tone with the anthology he planned. "You will have to be careful not to make claims for a greater radicalism than this volume will show,” he warned Smith.

For his part, Smith objected to the inclusion of the Toronto poets, describing Finch's imagery as "trite and undistinguished" and some of his lines as "distressingly Emily Dickensian," and calling Pratt "the weakest member of the group—judging of course by his inclusions only." However, Scott held firm on keeping both Pratt and Finch. The final selection was: twelve poems by Smith, eleven by Finch, ten by Kennedy, ten by Scott, eight by Pratt, and two longer poems ("Out of the Pulver and the Polished Lens" and "Soirée of Velvel Kleinburger") by Klein.

=== 1936 edition ===
New Provinces, First Edition, 1936.

Scott may have insisted on keeping Pratt to increase the chances of publication. Of the Montreal poets, only Kennedy had previously published a single volume of verse; in contrast, Pratt had been releasing books of poetry for over a decade. "Macmillan Canada had published Pratt’s poetry in the past, and Pratt approached Macmillan’s literary editor Hugh Eayrs on behalf of the New Provinces group" in 1934.

One casualty of Pratt's involvement was Smith's Preface. Pratt, who was editor of the Canadian Poetry Magazine, "objected to the Preface because its radical pronouncements could alienate half his magazine’s readers, and Scott wrote to Finch, 'We would not willingly compromise him'." Finch seconded Pratt's objections, prompting Smith to write to Scott: "Who the hell are Finch and Pratt to object to the preface? If I am willing to let my poems come out in the same book with Pratt's insipid stuff, he can take the preface." However, Smith's Preface was also "rejected by the publisher as being too impatient with traditional Canadian poetry", and it was dropped, with Scott writing a more "modest" Preface instead.

When Macmillan also demanded "that the poets pay $200 toward the production of 650 to 675 copies of New Provinces, Scott looked elsewhere, and submitted the manuscript to the Dent publishing company. At this point, Pratt threatened to leave the project if Macmillan did not publish it.... In the end, Scott paid the bulk of the cost, $120, while Finch and Pratt each contributed $40. Smith, who could easily afford the fee, refused to contribute because of the argument over his Preface."

New Provinces finally was printed in a limited run of 500 copies, of which only 250 were bound for sale, on May 9–11, 1936. All told, it "took 4 years of negotiation and pleading on the part of Scott before it was finally published by the Macmillan Co. of Canada."

While the book sold poorly, it had an effect on those who read it. "The poems in New Provinces had an impact on Canadian verse far beyond any prefatorial pronouncements: in its implicit call for new findings and new attitudes in Canadian writing, it might be likened to the effect of the Wordsworth-Coleridge Lyrical ballads in 1798 on the Romantics.... The effect of New provinces was that it established the ‘Montreal Group’ as the Canadian avant-garde of its time."

=== 1976 edition ===
New Provinces was republished in 1976 by the University of Toronto Press, as part of its "Literature in Canada" series. Smith's unused Preface (which had been published in 1964 as the "Rejected Preface") was incorporated into the new work as an "important feature." As well, a new introduction was written by editor Michael Gnarowski.

=== Appraisal ===
The flyleaf of the 1976 edition called New Provinces "a monument in Canadian literature," and in his introduction, Gnarowski described it as "a singular event in a literary process which stemmed from the origins of Canadian modernism." Others have made similar claims about its significance: "In the Literary History of Canada, Munro Beattie calls New Provinces 'a literary milestone,' and 'a literary signpost' (753,754). More recently, Brian Trehearne describes New Provinces as 'the landmark publication that signalled the demise of the old school of Canadian poetry' (Aestheticism 115)." In The Encyclopedia of Literature in Canada, literary critic and anthologist W.H. New called New Provinces "an anthology that has between its covers the most famous enactment of modernist values in Canada."

Later opinions were less praising. The 1997 Oxford Companion to Canadian Literature called the book "commercially unsuccessful but critically important," while in 2003 Canadian Poetry published an essay "designed to question a literary history which has canonized an unsuccessful volume of poetry published by a small group of Canadian modernists who excluded female poets."

Despite poor sales and charges of sexism, though, New Province's place in the modern Canadian canon looks assured. Besides its historical status as the first anthology of modern Canadian poetry, it is also notable for its contributors. Every contributor except for Kennedy (who never published another book) went on to win the Governor General's Award, Canada's top literary honor, for poetry.

As only 350 copies of the first edition were ever bound, it is extremely rare. A copy was being offered for sale in 2011 for $750.
