= 1946 Governor General's Awards =

Canadian literary award

The 1946 Governor General's Awards for Literary Merit were the eleventh rendition of the Governor General's Awards, Canada's annual national awards program which then comprised literary awards alone. The awards recognized Canadian writers for new English-language works published in Canada during 1946 and were presented in 1947. There were no cash prizes.

The 1946 awards were announced on April 19, 1947, in Toronto, Ontario. As every year from 1942 to 1948, there two awards for non-fiction, and four awards in the three established categories, which recognized English-language works only.

== Winners ==
- Fiction: Winifred Bambrick, Continental Revue
- Poetry or drama: Robert Finch, Poems
- Non-fiction: Frederick Philip Grove, In Search of Myself
- Non-fiction: Arthur R. M. Lower, Colony to Nation

== Stephen Leacock Award ==
The Stephen Leacock Memorial Medal for Humour, commonly called the Stephen Leacock Award, recognizes the previous year's best English-language book of humour by a Canadian writer. It was inaugurated for 1946 publications when the winner was announced along with the Governor General's Literary Awards in April 1947 although it was – and always has been – separately administered and presented. As of 2015 the Leacock Medal approximately maintains its original schedule (2015, for 2014 publications: winner announced online, May 13; Leacock ceremony, first weekend in June) Meanwhile, the ceremonial date of the Governor General's Literary Awards has advanced to November of the publication year.

- Stephen Leacock Award: Harry L. Symons, Ojibway Melody

(That is the 1947 Leacock Award, after the year of announcement and presentation.)
