= 1939 Governor General's Awards =

Canadian literary award

The 1939 Governor General's Awards for Literary Merit were the fourth rendition of the Governor General's Awards, Canada's annual national awards program which then comprised literary awards alone. The awards recognized Canadian writers for new English-language works published in Canada during 1939 and were presented in 1940. There were no cash prizes.

There was one award in each of three established categories, which recognized English-language works only.

== Winners ==
- Fiction: Franklin D. McDowell, The Champlain Road
- Poetry or drama: Arthur S. Bourinot, Under the Sun
- Non-fiction: Laura G. Salverson, Confessions of an Immigrant's Daughter
