= Carolyn Smart =

English author (born 1952)

Carolyn Smart (born 1952 in England) is an author, mostly of poetry, who lives rurally north of Kingston, Ontario, Canada.

She was seventeen when she published her first poem in an anthology entitled Vibrations (Gage Publishing, 1969), intended for study in schools. She continued to publish while studying English Literature and Eastern Religion at the University of Toronto. She gave her first public reading at Hart House in 1972, and began writing full-time in 1979, with her first collection of poetry appearing in 1981.

As a teenager her earliest influences were ee cummings and Leonard Cohen, and in her 20s she became fascinated by Virginia Woolf, Sylvia Plath, Anne Sexton, W.S. Merwin, Galway Kinnell, Robert Bly and Michael Ondaatje. In later years she has been drawn to the work of a broad range of poets, both narrative and lyric, including Jane Kenyon, Marie Howe, Carolyn Forché, Selima Hill, Carol Ann Duffy, Mark Strand, Sharon Olds, Mark Doty, Lynda Hull, Patricia Smith, Elizabeth Bishop, Phil Hall, and Bronwen Wallace.

Carolyn Smart's collections of poetry have been Swimmers in Oblivion (York Publishing, 1981), Power Sources (Fiddlehead Poetry Books, 1982), Stoning the Moon (Oberon Press, 1986), The Way to Come Home (Brick Books, 1993), Hooked - Seven Poems (Brick Books, 2009) and her poetic study of the Barrow Gang, Careen (Brick Books, 2015). Her memoir At the End of the Day was published by Penumbra Press in 2001, and an excerpt won first prize in the 1993 CBC Literary Contest. She has taught poetry at the Banff Centre and participated online for Writers in Electronic Residence. She is the founder of the RBC Bronwen Wallace Award for Emerging Writers, and since 1989 has been Professor of Creative Writing at Queen's University. Both Careen and Hooked have become theatrical productions, the former in Canada and the U.K., and Hooked was nominated for three Dora Mavor Moore awards after a full length production at Theatre Passe Muraille. It has toured across Canada, as well as multiple productions in the U.K., including the Edinburgh And RADA Festivals.

== Bibliography ==
Books

- Careen. London, Ontario: Brick Books, Sept. 2015
- Hooked. London, Ontario: Brick Books, 2009
- The Way To Come Home. London, Ontario: Brick Books, 1992, 1997 & 2003.
- Stoning the Moon. Ottawa: Oberon Press, 1986.
- Power Sources. Fredericton, N.B.: Fiddlehead Poetry Books, 1982.
- Swimmers in Oblivion. Toronto: York Publishing, 1981.
- At the End of the Day, A Memoir. Manotick: Penumbra Press, 2001.

Poems and Essays in Anthologies

- Poetry by Canadian Women. Ed. Rosemary Sullivan. Toronto: Oxford University Press, 1989.
- Anything Is Possible: A Selection of Eleven Women Poets. Ed. Mary di Michele. Oakville, Ontario: Mosaic Press, 1984.
- Best Canadian Essays. Ed. Douglas Fetherling. Toronto: Fifth House, 1989.
- New Life in Dark Seas. Ed. Stan Dragland. Toronto: Brick Books, 2000.
- The Dominion of Love. Ed. Tom Wayman. Vancouver: Harbour Publishing, 2001.
- How the Light Gets In. Ed. John Ennis. Waterford, Ireland: School of Humanities Publications, 2009.
- Pith and Wry. Ed. Susan McMaster. Sudbury: Scrivener Press, 2010.
