= Towards the Last Spike =

1952 long poem by E. J. Pratt

- by E.J. Pratt
- First edition
- First published in: 1952
- Country: Canada
- Language: English
- Publisher: Macmillan of Canada

Towards the Last Spike was written in 1952 by Canadian poet E. J. Pratt. It is a long narrative poem in blank verse about the construction of the first transcontinental railroad line in Canada, that of the Canadian Pacific Railway (CPR), from 1871 through 1885.

The poem won Pratt the Governor General's Award, Canada's top literary honor, for poetry in 1952.

It is written in an epic style, where characters engage in both verbal and physical struggle. The poem also has a political context, illuminated by the debates between Prime Minister John A. Macdonald (for the railway) versus Edward Blake (against). The physical tests throughout the poem are a battle between the forces of nature (the Canadian Shield is personified as a prehistoric monster) versus the combined might of the construction team headed by William Van Horne.

In his introduction to Pratt's 1968 Selected Poems, literary critic Peter Buitenhuis says of the piece:

In this poem man has the chance to learn from his mistakes and to employ his sinews and his technology to throw his thin lines of steel across muskeg and mountain. Again Pratt is using a mosaic technique of organizing his diverse material; but because Towards the Last Spike contains a great deal of political material, it is looser in form than the other epics. The gigantic nature of his theme tends to make the poem too impersonal, even though forces like the North Shore Laurentian monster and Lady British Columbia are personified.... Fortunately, the gigantism of these forces is almost matched by the human figures that Pratt has chosen as his heroes, William Van Horne and Sir John A. Macdonald. The two men are complementary in the poem: Macdonald, rhetorician and parliamentarian, supplies the dream of continental union; Van Horne, engineer and administrator, supplies the force and skill that makes the dream come true.

The poem ends with the famous driving home of the last spike at Craigellachie:

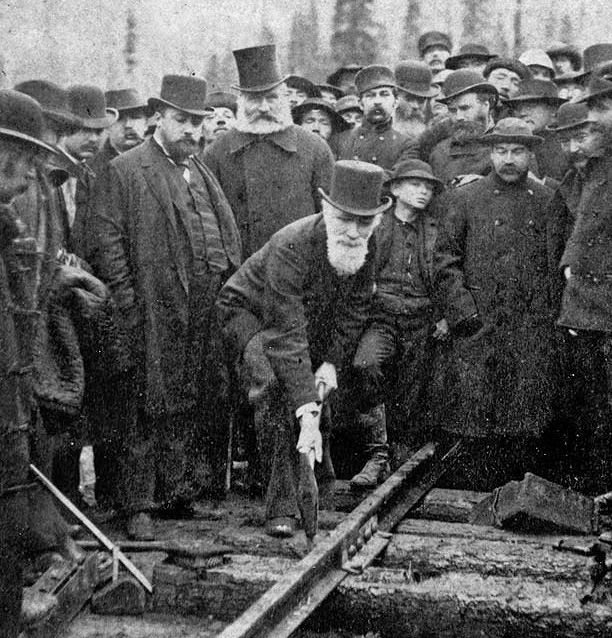
Donald Smith, later known as Lord Strathcona, drives the last spike of the Canadian Pacific Railway, at Craigellachie, November 7, 1885.

The stroke released the trigger for a burst
Of sound which stretched the gamut of the air.
The shouts of engineers and dynamiters,
Of locomotive-workers and explorers,
Flanking the rails, were but a tuning up
For a massed continental chorus.

When Towards the Last Spike appeared, Canadian literary critic Northrop Frye wrote that

Pratt has shown an increasing interest in techniques of communication, an interest which may well go back to his early days as a student of psychology.... The theme of the epic act of communication in Canadian history, the linking of east and west by a great railway, was thus a logical one for Pratt to choose for his latest poem.... But while the choice of theme may have been easy, the theme itself is fantastically difficult. The poem is in the epic tradition, without any of the advantages of epic to sustain it. No narrative suspense is possible where the ground has all been surveyed; no heroic action can be isolated in so concentrated an act of social will.... The real hero of the poem is a society's will to take intelligible form; the real quest is for physical and spiritual communication within that society. I have a notion that the technical problems involved in Towards the Last Spike are going to be central problems in the poetry of the future. And I think that the ingenuity with which these problems have been met would make the poem a historical landmark even for readers who disliked it as a poem."

"There would be much more to say about the poem if I had the space," Frye added. "There is the contrast between the desperate, quixotic, east-west reach from sea to sea which is the vision of Macdonald ... and the practical, short-sighted vision of Blake, which sees the country realistically, as a divided series of northern extensions of the United States.... There is the portrait of Strathcona as a Canadian culture-hero, a combination of Paul Bunyan and Sam Slick.... Above all, Pratt is a poet unusually aware of the traditional connection between poetry and oratory." He concluded: "The faults of the poem are obvious and commonplace; its virtues are subtle and remarkable."

Frye later wrote that Pratt had "expressed in Towards the Last Spike the central comic theme ... of the Canadian imagination."

Three years after its publication, fellow Canadian poet, F.R. Scott, critiqued Pratt for overlooking the thousands of indentured Chinese labourers who actually built the railway in his poem "All the Spikes but the Last."

== See also ==
- Last Spike (Canadian Pacific Railway)
