= 1952 Governor General's Awards =

Canadian literary award

In Canada, the 1952 Governor General's Awards for Literary Merit were the sixteenth such awards. The awards in this period had no monetary prize and were just an honour for the authors.

== Winners ==
- Fiction: David Walker, The Pillar.
- Poetry or Drama: E. J. Pratt, Towards the Last Spike.
- Non-Fiction: Bruce Hutchison, The Incredible Canadian.
- Non-Fiction: Donald G. Creighton, John A. Macdonald, The Young Politician.
- Juvenile: Marie McPhedran, Cargoes on the Great Lakes.
