= E. J. Pratt =

Canadian poet (1882–1964)

E. J. Pratt CMG FRSC
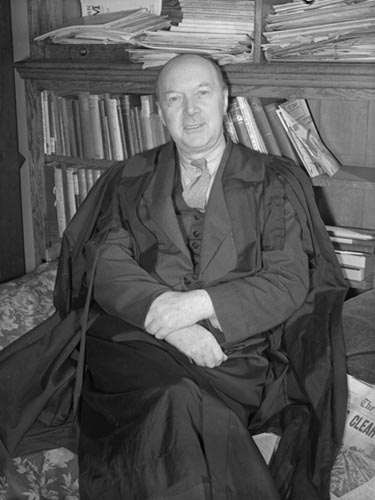
- Pratt in 1944
- Born: Edwin John Dove Pratt; February 4, 1882; Western Bay, Newfoundland
- Died: April 26, 1964 (aged 82); Toronto, Ontario, Canada
- Citizenship: British subject
- Education: Master of Arts
- Alma mater: Victoria University, Toronto (BA)
- Spouse: Viola Whitney Pratt
- Writing career
- Language: English
- Genre: Poetry
- Notable awards: Governor General's Award, FRSC, Lorne Pierce Medal

Edwin John Dove Pratt CMG FRSC (February 4, 1882 – April 26, 1964), who published as E. J. Pratt, was a Canadian poet. Originally from Newfoundland, Pratt lived most of his life in Toronto, Ontario. A three-time winner of the country's Governor General's Award for poetry, he has been called "the foremost Canadian poet of the first half of the century."

== Early life ==
EJ Pratt or fully known as Edwin John Dove Pratt was born in Western Bay, Newfoundland, on February 4, 1882. He was brought up in a variety of Newfoundland communities as his father John Pratt was posted around the colony as a Methodist minister. John Pratt was originally a lead miner from Old Gang mines in Gunnerside – a village in North Yorkshire, England. In the 1850s he became a Methodist pastor and immigrated to Newfoundland and settled down with Fanny Knight, a daughter of Capt. William Chancey Knight. EJ Pratt and his seven siblings were under strict control of their father, who had high expectations of all of them. While John was strict and stern father, who had firm authority with which he ruled his family, Edwin and his siblings got a bit of a break when his father was gone on pastoral rounds, since their mother was very different in temperament from her husband. "Fanny Pratt was easy-going and unpunctilious where John was careful and exacting, lenient and forbearing where he was strict and inflexible, soft hearted where he was hard-headed – she inevitably had a closer, more comradely relationship with the children. Raised in a less rigoristic household than he, she was prepared to take her children for what they were, make allowances for their fallen natures, and generally overlook their innocent iniquities" E.J. Pratt's brother, Calvert Pratt, became a Canadian Senator.

E.J. Pratt graduated from Newfoundland's Methodist College in St. John's in 1901. Like his father he became a candidate for the Methodist ministry, in 1904, and served a three-year probation before entering Victoria College of the University of Toronto. He studied psychology and theology, receiving his BA in 1911 and his Bachelor of Divinity in 1913.

Pratt married fellow Victoria College student Viola Whitney, herself a writer, in 1918, and they had one daughter, Claire Pratt, who also became a writer and poet.

Pratt was ordained as a minister, in 1913, and served as an Assistant Minister in Streetsville, Ontario, until 1920. Also in 1913, he joined the University of Toronto as a lecturer in psychology. As well, he continued to take classes, receiving his PhD in 1917.

Pratt was invited by Pelham Edgar in 1920 to switch to the University's faculty of English, where he became a professor in 1930 and a Senior Professor in 1938. He taught English literature at Victoria College until his retirement in 1953. He served as Literary Adviser to the college literary journal, Acta Victoriana. As a professor, Pratt published a number of articles, reviews, and introductions (including those to four Shakespeare plays), and edited Thomas Hardy's Under the greenwood tree (1937).

== Writing ==
Pratt's first published poem was "A Poem on the May examinations," printed in Acta Victoriana in 1909 when he was a student. In 1917 he privately published a long poem, Rachel: A Sea Story of Newfoundland. He then spent two years working on a verse drama, Clay, which he ended by burning (except for one copy which Mrs. Pratt managed to save).

It was only in 1923 that Pratt's first commercial poetry collection, Newfoundland Verse, was released. It contains "A Fragment of a Story," the only piece of Clay that Pratt ever published, and the conclusion to Rachel. "Newfoundland verse (1923), is frequently archaic in diction, and reflects a pietistic and sometimes preciously lyrical sensibility of late-Romantic derivation, characteristics that may account for Pratt's reprinting less than half these poems in his Collected poems (1958). The most genuine feeling is expressed in humorous and sympathetic portraits of Newfoundland characters, and in the creation of an elegiac mood in poems concerning sea tragedies or Great War losses. The sea, which on the one hand provides 'the bread of life' and on the other represents ‘the waters of death’ ('Newfoundland'), is a central element as setting, subject, and creator of mood."

With illustrations by Group of Seven member Frederick Varley, Newfoundland Verse proved to be Pratt's "breakthrough collection." He would publish 18 more books of poetry in his lifetime. "Recognition came with the narrative poems The Witches' Brew (1925), Titans (1926), and The Roosevelt and the Antinoe (1930), and though he published a substantial body of lyric verse, it is as a narrative poet that Pratt is remembered."

"Pratt's poetry frequently reflects his Newfoundland background, though specific references to it appear in relatively few poems, mostly in Newfoundland Verse," says The Canadian Encyclopedia. "But the sea and maritime life are central to many of his poems, both short (e.g., "Erosion," "Sea-Gulls," "Silences") and long, such as "The Cachalot" (1926), describing duels between a whale and its foes, a giant squid and a whaling ship and crew; The Roosevelt and the Antinoe (1930), recounting the heroic rescue of the crew of a sinking freighter in a winter hurricane; The Titanic (1935), an ironic retelling of a well-known marine tragedy; and Behind the Log (1947), the dramatic story of the North Atlantic convoys during World War II."

Another constant motif in Pratt's writing was evolution. "Pratt's work is filled with images of primitive nature and evolutionary history," wrote literary critic Peter Buitenhuis. "It seemed instinctive to him to write of molluscs, of cetacean and cephalopod, of Java and Piltdown Man. The evolutionary process early became and always remained the central metaphor of Pratt's work." He added that evolution provided Pratt "the solid framework within which he could achieve an epic style," and also "gave him the themes for his best lyrics" (such as his much-anthologized "From Stone to Steel," from 1932's Many Moods.)

Pratt founded Canadian Poetry Magazine in 1935, and served as its first editor until 1943. He published 10 poems in the 1936 "milestone selection of modernist verse," New Provinces, edited by F. R. Scott.

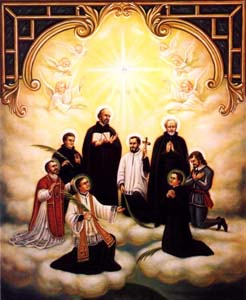
The North American martyrs

In 1937, with war on the horizon, Pratt wrote an anti-war poem, "The Fable of the Goats", which became the title poem of his next volume. The Fable of the Goats and Other Poems, which included his classic free-verse poem "Silences," won him his first Governor General's Award.

Pratt returned to Canadian history in 1940 to write Brébeuf and his Brethren, a blank-verse epic on the mission of Jean de Brébeuf and his seven fellow Jesuits, the North American Martyrs, to the Hurons in the 17th century; their founding of Sainte-Marie-among-the-Hurons; and their eventual martyrdom by the Iroquois. "Pratt's research-oriented methodology is made clear in the precise diction and detailed, documentary-style recounting of events and observation in this, his first attempt to write a national epic; but in his ethnocentrism Pratt presents the Jesuit priests as an enclave of civilization beleaguered by savages." Canadian literary critic Northrop Frye has said that Brébeuf expresses "the central tragic theme of the Canadian imagination."

Expounding on that theme in 1943, in a review essay of A.J.M. Smith's anthology The Book of Canadian Poetry, Frye stated that, in Canadian poetry:

The unconscious horror of nature and the subconscious horrors of the mind thus coincide: this amalgamation is the basis of symbolism on which nearly all Pratt's poetry is founded. The fumbling and clumsy monsters of his "Pliocene Armageddon," who are simply incarnate wills to mutual destruction, are the same monsters that beget Nazism and inspire The Fable of the Goats; and in the fine "Silences," which Mr. Smith includes, civilized life is seen geologically as merely one clock-tick in eons of ferocity. The waste of life in the death of the Cachalot and the waste of courage and sanctity in the killing of the Jesuit missionaries are tragedies of a unique kind in modern poetry: like the tragedy of Job, they seem to move upward to a vision of a monstrous Leviathan, a power of chaotic nihilism which is "king over all the children of pride."

By the time Brébeuf was published the war had begun; and "in his next four volumes, Pratt returned to themes of patriotism and violence. Sea poetry merges with war poetry in Dunkirk (1941), which recounts the epic rescue of British forces while also emphasizing its democratic nature.... Language plays a pivotal role as Churchill's call inspires the miraculous deliverance. The title poem in Still Life and Other Verse (1943) satirizes poets who ignore the destruction, the still life, all about them in wartime.... Other poems include 'The Radio in the Ivory Tower,' which shows isolation from world events to be impossible,... 'The Submarine,' which highlights the atavism of modern warfare by treating the submarine as a shark; and 'Come Away, Death,' which personifies death to show its new horrors in modern times."

Still Life and Other Verse included another poem, "The Truant," which Frye later called "the greatest poem in Canadian literature." In "The Truant," a "somewhat comic deity, who speaks in evolutionary terms and metaphors, has man hauled before him to be punished for messing up the grand evolving scheme of things. Cheeky genus homo, instead of being duly cowed by the Great Panjandrum, points out that He is largely man's invention in any case." Says Buitenhuis: "The poem is too simplistic to be convincing, but is essential reading for anyone who seeks to understand Pratt's thought."

Pratt's next book, "They are Returning (1945) celebrates the anticipated end of the war, but also introduces one of the first treatments in literature of the concentration camps. And retrospectively, Behind the Log (1947) commemorates the wartime role of the Royal Canadian Navy and the merchant marine."

By 1952, Frye was calling Pratt one of "Canada's two leading poets" (the other being Earle Birney). In that year Pratt published Towards the Last Spike, his final epic, on the building of Canada's first transcontinental railroad, the Canadian Pacific Railway. "Presenting an anglo/central-Canadian perspective, the poem interweaves the political battles between Sir John A. Macdonald and Edward Blake with the labourers' physical battles against mountains, mud, and the Laurentian Shield. In a metaphorical method typical of his style, Pratt characterizes the Shield as a prehistoric lizard rudely aroused from its sleep by the railroad builders' dynamite."

Pratt's reputation as a major poet rests on his longer narrative poems, "many of which show him as a mythologizer of the Canadian male experience; but a number of shorter philosophical works also command recognition. 'From stone to steel' asserts the necessity for redemptive suffering arising from the failure of humanity's spiritual evolution to keep pace without physical evolution and cultural achievements; 'Come away, death' is a complexly allusive account of the way the once-articulate and ceremonial human response to death was rendered inarticulate by the primitive violence of a sophisticated bomb; and 'The truant' dramatically presents a confrontation in a thoroughly patriarchal cosmos between the fiercely independent 'little genus homo' and a totalitarian mechanistic power, 'the great Panjandrum'. Pratt's choices of forms and metrics were conservative for his time; but his diction was experimental, reflecting in its specificity and its frequent technicality both his belief in the poetic power of the accurate and concrete that led him into assiduous research processes, and his view that one of the poet's tasks is to bridge the gap between the two branches of human pursuit: the scientific and artistic."

The Canadian Encyclopedia adds of Pratt: "A major poet, he is, nevertheless, an isolated figure, belonging to no school or movement and directly influencing few other poets of his time."

== Recognition ==
Pratt won Canada's top poetry prize, the Governor General's Award, three times: in 1937 for The Fable of the Goats and other Poems; in 1940 for Brébeuf and his Brethren; and in 1952, for Towards the Last Spike.

He was elected to the Royal Society of Canada in 1930, and was awarded the Society's Lorne Pierce Medal in 1940. In 1946, he was appointed Companion of the Order of St. Michael and St. George by King George VI.

He was awarded a Canada Council Medal for distinction in literature in 1961.

He was designated a Person of National Historic Significance in 1975.

The University of Toronto's Victoria University library currently bears his name, as do the University's E.J. Pratt Medal and Prize for poetry. Winners of the award include Margaret Atwood in 1961 and Michael Ondaatje in 1966.

The E. J. Pratt Chair in Canadian Literature was created in his name by the University of Toronto in 2003. The chair has been held since its founding by George Elliot Clarke.

The E.J. Pratt commemorative stamp was released in 1983.

== Publications ==
=== Poetry ===
- Rachel: a sea story of Newfoundland, private, 1917
- Newfoundland Verse, Toronto: Ryerson, 1923. illus. Frederick Varley.
- The Witches' Brew, Toronto: Macmillan, 1925. illus. John Austin.
- Titans ("The Cachalot, The Great Feud"), Toronto: Macmillan, 1926. illus. John Austin.
- The Iron Door: An Ode, Toronto: Macmillan, 1927. illus. Thoreau Macdonald.
- The Roosevelt and the Antinoe, Toronto: Macmillan, 1930
- Verses of the Sea, Toronto: Macmillan, 1930. intr. by Charles G.D. Roberts.
- Many Moods, Toronto: Macmillan, 1932.
- The Titanic, Toronto: Macmillan, 1935.
- New Provinces: Poems of Several Authors, Toronto: Macmillan, 1936 (eight poems).
- The Fable of the Goats and Other Poems, Toronto: Macmillan, 1937 GGLA
- Brebeuf and his Brethren, Toronto: Macmillan, 1940. Detroit: Basilian Press, 1942. GGLA
- Dunkirk, Toronto: Macmillan, 1941
- Still Life and Other Verse, Toronto: Macmillan, 1943
- Collected Poems of E. J. Pratt, Toronto: Macmillan, 1944. New York: Alfred A. Knopf, 1946.
- They Are Returning, Toronto: Macmillan, 1945
- Behind the Log, Toronto: Macmillan, 1947
- Ten Selected Poems, Toronto: Macmillan, 1947
- Towards the Last Spike, Toronto: Macmillan, 1952. GGLA
- "Magic in Everything" [Christmas card]. Toronto: Macmillan, 1956.
- Collected Poems of E. J. Pratt (2nd edition), Toronto: Macmillan, 1958. intr. by Northrop Frye.
- The Royal Visit: 1959, Toronto: CBC Information Services, 1959.
- Here the Tides Flow, Toronto: Macmillan, 1962. intr. by D.G. Pitt.
- Selected Poems of E. J. Pratt, Peter Buitenhuis ed., Toronto: Macmillan, 1968.
- E. J. Pratt: Complete Poems (two volumes), Toronto: Macmillan, 1989
- Selected Poems of E.J. Pratt, Sandra Djwa, W.J. Keith, and Zailig Pollock ed. Toronto: University of Toronto Press, 1998).

=== Prose ===
- Studies in Pauline Eschatology. Toronto: William Briggs, 1917.
- "Canadian Poetry – Past and Present," University of Toronto Quarterly, VIII:1 (Oct. 1938), 1-10.

=== Edited ===
- Thomas Hardy, Under the Greenwood Tree. Toronto, Macmillan, 1937.
- Heroic Tales in Verse. Toronto, Macmillan, 1941, 1977.

Except where noted, pre-1970 information is from Selected Poems of E.J. Pratt (1968)

== See also ==
- Canadian literature
- Canadian poetry
- List of Canadian poets
