= 1964 in Australian literature =

This article presents a list of the historical events and publications of Australian literature during 1964.

== Events ==
- The Australian newspaper published its first issue on 14 July 1964, becoming Australia's first national daily newspaper. It is published by Rupert Murdoch's News Limited.

== Major publications ==
=== Books ===
- Raymond Aitchison – The Illegitimates
- Patricia Carlon – The Price of an Orphan
- Alan Chester – Brother Captain
- Jon Cleary
  - The Fall of an Eagle
  - A Flight of Chariots
- Charmian Clift – Honour's Mimic
- Peter Cowan – Summer
- Dymphna Cusack – Black Lightning
- Lola Irish – Shadow Mountain
- George Johnston
  - The Far Face of the Moon
  - My Brother Jack
- Thomas Keneally – The Place at Whitton
- John McGhee – Sundry Debtors
- Frank O'Grady – The Sun Breaks Through
- John Patrick – Weave a Circle
- Dan Reidy – It's This Way
- David Rowbotham – The Man in the Jungle
- F. J. Thwaites – A Mountain for Monique
- John Tranter – The Livin' is Easy
- Judah Waten – Distant Land

=== Short stories ===
- Nancy Cato – The Sea Ants and Other Stories
- Peter Cowan – "The Tractor"
- Frank Dalby Davison – The Road to Yesterday : Collected Short Stories
- Patrick White – The Burnt Ones

=== Science fiction and fantasy ===
- Russell Braddon – The Year of the Angry Rabbit
- Damien Broderick – "All My Yesterdays"
- A. Bertram Chandler
  - The Deep Reaches of Space
  - The Coils of Time / Into the Alternative Universe

=== Children's and Young Adult fiction ===
- Hesba Brinsmead – Pastures of the Blue Crane
- Nan Chauncy – High and Haunted Island
- Ruth Park
  - Airlift for Grandee
  - The Muddle-Headed Wombat on Holiday

=== Poetry ===
- Bruce Dawe – "How to Go On Not Looking"
- A. D. Hope – "An Epistle : Edward Sackville to Venetia Digby"
- T. Inglis Moore – From the Ballads to Brennan (edited)
- Oodgeroo Noonuccal – We Are Going : Poems
- Peter Porter – "Sydney Cove, 1788"
- David Rowbotham – All the Room
- Thomas Shapcott – The Mankind Thing
- Vivian Smith – "Late April : Hobart"
- Douglas Stewart – Modern Australian Verse (edited)
- Randolph Stow – "Ishmael"
- Francis Webb – The Ghost of the Cock : Poems

=== Non-fiction ===
- Donald Horne – The Lucky Country
- Douglas Lockwood – Up the Track

=== Drama ===
- Frank Hardy – The Ringbolter
- David Ireland – Image in the Clay
- Patrick White – Night on Bald Mountain

== Awards and honours ==
=== Literary ===
Award	Author	Title	Publisher
ALS Gold Medal	Geoffrey Blainey	The Rush that Never Ended	Melbourne University Press
Miles Franklin Award	George Johnston	My Brother Jack	Collins

=== Children and Young Adult ===
Award	Category	Author	Title	Publisher
Children's Book of the Year Award	Older Readers	Eleanor Spence	The Green Laurel	Oxford University Press
Children's Book of the Year Award	Picture Book	No award		

=== Poetry ===
Award	Author	Title	Publisher
Grace Leven Prize for Poetry	David Rowbotham	All the Room	Jacaranda Press

== Births ==
A list, ordered by date of birth (and, if the date is either unspecified or repeated, ordered alphabetically by surname) of births in 1964 of Australian literary figures, authors of written works or literature-related individuals follows, including year of death.

- 7 May – Elliot Perlman, novelist
- 21 July – Gillian Mears, novelist (died 2016)
- 7 August – John Birmingham, novelist and journalist
- 10 August – Heather Rose, novelist
- 28 August – Traci Harding, science fiction and fantasy novelist
- 12 December – Georgia Blain, novelist, journalist and biographer (died 2016)

Unknown date

- Jonathan Strahan, editor and anthologist (born in Belfast)

== Deaths ==
A list, ordered by date of death (and, if the date is either unspecified or repeated, ordered alphabetically by surname) of deaths in 1964 of Australian literary figures, authors of written works or literature-related individuals follows, including year of birth.

- 22 January – Zora Cross, poet (born 1890)
- 12 February – Arthur Upfield, novelist (born 1890)
- 1 May – Ethel Nhill Victoria Stonehouse, novelist and poet (born 1883)
- 19 October – Nettie Palmer, critic and journalist (born 1885)
- 21 October – E. Morris Miller, literary scholar and historian (born 1881 in Natal)

== See also ==
- 1964 in Australia
- 1964 in literature
- 1964 in poetry
- List of years in Australian literature
- List of years in literature
