= Children's Book of the Year Award: Older Readers =

Australian literary award from 1946

- Awarded for: Outstanding Australian books (fiction, drama, illustrated text, poetry or graphic novels) for 13–18-year olds
- Country: Australia
- Presented by: Children's Book Council of Australia
- First award: 1946; 80 years ago
- Website: http://www.cbca.org.au/

The Children's Book of the Year Award: Older Readers has been presented annually since 1946 by the Children's Book Council of Australia (CBCA). Note: from 1946 to 1986 this award was known as "Book of the Year".

The Award "will be made to outstanding books of fiction, drama, or poetry which require of the reader a degree of maturity to appreciate the topics, themes and scope of emotional involvement. Generally, books in this category will be appropriate in style and content for readers in their secondary years of schooling."

== Award winners ==
=== 1940s ===
Year	Author	Title	Publisher	Ref.
1946	Leslie Rees, illustrated by Walter Cunningham	The Story of Karrawingi the Emu	John Sands	
1947	No award			
1948	Frank Hurley	Shackleton's Argonauts: A Saga of the Antarctic Icepacks	Angus and Robertson	
1949	No competition			

=== 1950s ===
Year	Author	Title	Publisher	Ref.
1950	Alan J. Villiers, illustrated by Charles Pont	Whalers of the Midnight Sun	Angus and Robertson	
1951	Ruth C. Williams, illustrated by Rhys Williams	Verity of Sydney Town	Angus and Robertson	
1952	Eve Pownall, illustrated by Margaret Senior	The Australia Book	John Sands	
1953	Joan Phipson, illustrated by Margaret Horder	Good Luck to the Rider	Angus and Robertson	
1953	James H. Martin and W. D. Martin	Aircraft of Today and Tomorrow	Angus and Robertson	
1954	K. Langloh Parker, edited by Henrietta Drake-Brockman, illustrated by Elizabeth Durack	Australian Legendary Tales	Angus and Robertson	
1955	Norman B. Tindale and Harold Arthur Lindsay, illustrated by Madeleine Boyce	The First Walkabout	Longmans Green	
1956	Patricia Wrightson, illustrated by Margaret Horder	The Crooked Snake	Angus and Robertson	
1957	Enid Moodie Heddle (ed.), illustrated by Nancy Parker	The Boomerang Book of Legendary Tales	Longmans Green	
1958	Nan Chauncy	Tiger in the Bush	Oxford University Press	
1959	Nan Chauncy, illustrated by Geraldine Spence	Devil's Hill	Oxford University Press	
1959	John Gunn, illustrated by Brian Keogh	Sea Menace	Constable	

=== 1960s ===
Year	Author	Title	Publisher	Ref.
1960	Kylie Tennant, illustrated by Clem Seale	All the Proud Tribesmen	Macmillan	
1961	Nan Chauncy, illustrated by Brian Wildsmith	Tangara	Oxford University Press	
1962	Joan Woodberry	Rafferty Rides a Winner	M. Parrish, London	
1962	L. H. Evers	The Racketty Street Gang	Hodder & Stoughton	
1963	Joan Phipson, illustrated by Margaret Horder	The Family Conspiracy	Constable	
1964	Eleanor Spence, illustrated by Geraldine Spence	The Green Laurel	Oxford University Press	
1965	H. F. Brinsmead, illustrated by Annette Macarthur-Onslow	Pastures of the Blue Crane	Oxford University Press	
1966	Ivan Southall, illustrated by Clem Seale	Ash Road	Angus and Robertson	
1967	Mavis Thorpe Clark, illustrated by Genevieve Melrose	The Min-Min	Lansdowne Press	
1968	Ivan Southall, illustrated by Jennifer Tuckwell	To the Wild Sky	Angus and Robertson	
1969	Margaret Balderson, illustrated by Victor G. Ambrus	When Jays Fly to Barbmo	Oxford University Press	

=== 1970s ===
Year	Author	Title	Publisher	Ref.
1970	Annette Macarthur-Onslow	Uhu	Ure Smith	
1971	Ivan Southall	Bread and Honey	Angus and Robertson	
1972	H. F. Brinsmead	Longtime Passing	Angus and Robertson	
1973	Noreen Shelley, illustrated by Robert Micklewright	Family at the Lookout	Oxford University Press	
1974	Patricia Wrightson	The Nargun and the Stars	Hutchinson	
1975	No award			
1976	Ivan Southall	Fly West	Angus and Robertson	
1977	Eleanor Spence, illustrated by Malcolm Green	The October Child	Oxford University Press	
1978	Patricia Wrightson	The Ice is Coming	Hutchinson	
1979	Ruth Manley, illustrated by Marianne Yamaguchi	The Plum-Rain Scroll	Hodder and Stoughton	

=== 1980s ===
Year	Author	Title	Publisher	Ref.
1980	Lee Harding	Displaced Person	Hyland House	
1981	Ruth Park	Playing Beatie Bow	Nelson Books	
1982	Colin Thiele	The Valley Between	Opal Books	
1983	Victor Kelleher	Master of the Grove	Kestrel Books	
1984	Patricia Wrightson	A Little Fear	Hutchinson	
1985	James Aldridge	The True Story of Lilli Stubeck	Hyland House	
1986	Thurley Fowler	The Green Wind	Rigby	
1987	Simon French	All We Know	Angus and Robertson	
1988	John Marsden	So Much to Tell You	Joy Street Books	
1989	Gillian Rubinstein	Beyond the Labyrinth	Hyland House	

=== 1990s ===
Year	Author	Title	Publisher	Ref.
1990	Robin Klein	Came Back to Show You I Could Fly	Viking Books	
1991	Gary Crew	Strange Objects	Heinemann	
1992	Eleanor Nilsson	The House Guest	Viking Books	
1993	Melina Marchetta	Looking for Alibrandi	Puffin Books	
1994	Isobelle Carmody	The Gathering	Penguin Books	
1994	Gary Crew	Angel's Gate	Heinemann	
1995	Gillian Rubinstein	Foxspell	Hyland House	
1996	Catherine Jinks	Pagan's Vows	Omnibus Books	
1997	James Moloney	A Bridge to Wiseman's Cove	University of Queensland Press	
1998	Catherine Jinks	Eye to Eye	Puffin Books	
1999	Phillip Gwynne	Deadly, Unna?	Penguin Books	

=== 2000s ===
Year	Author	Title	Publisher	Ref
2000	Nick Earls	48 Shades of Brown	Penguin Books	
2001	Judith Clarke	Wolf on the Fold	Allen and Unwin	
2002	Sonya Hartnett	Forest	Viking Books	
2003	Markus Zusak	The Messenger	Macmillan Publishers	
2004	Melina Marchetta	Saving Francesca	Viking Books	
2005	Michael Gerard Bauer	The Running Man	Omnibus Books	
2006	J. C. Burke	The Story of Tom Brennan	Random House	
2007	Margo Lanagan	Red Spikes	Allen and Unwin	
2008	Sonya Hartnett	The Ghost's Child	Viking Books	
2009	Shaun Tan	Tales from Outer Suburbia	Allen and Unwin	

=== 2010s ===
Year	Author	Title	Publisher	Ref.
2010	David Metzenthen	Jarvis 24	Penguin Group	
2011	Sonya Hartnett	The Midnight Zoo	Viking Books	
2012	Scot Gardner	The Dead I Know	Allen & Unwin	
2013	Margo Lanagan	Sea Hearts	Allen & Unwin	
2014	Fiona Wood	Wildlife	Pan MacMillan	
2015	Claire Zorn	The Protected	University of Queensland Press	
2016	Fiona Wood	Cloudwish	Macmillan Australia	
2017	Claire Zorn	One Would Think the Deep	University of Queensland Press	
2018	Cath Crowley, Fiona Wood, and Simmone Howell	Take Three Girls	Pan Macmillan	
2019	Clare Atkins	Between Us	Black Inc.	

=== 2020s ===
Year	Author	Title	Publisher	Ref.
2020	Vikki Wakefield	This Is How We Change the Ending	Text Publishing	
2021	Davina Bell	The End of the World is Bigger than Love	Text Publishing	
2022	Rebecca Lim	Tiger Daughter	Allen & Unwin	
2023	Tom Taylor	Neverlanders	Penguin Random House	
2024	Karen Comer	Grace Notes	Lothian Children’s Books	
2025	Gary Lonesborough	I'm Not Really Here	Allen & Unwin	
2026	Barry Jonsberg	Darkest Night, Brightest Star	Allen & Unwin	

== Commended books ==
=== 1940s ===
Year	Author	Title	Publisher
1948	Veronica Basser	Ponny the Penguin	Australasian Publishing Co.
1948	Ada Jackson	Beetles A'Hoy!	Paterson's Press
1948	James H. Martin and W. D. Martin	The Australian Book of Trains	Angus and Robertson
1948	Musette Morell	Bush Cobbers	Australasian Publishing Co.
1948	Leslie Rees	The Story of Shadow, the Rock Wallaby	John Sands

=== 1950s ===
Year	Author	Title	Publisher	Ref.
1959	Elyne Mitchell	The Silver Brumby	Hutchinson	
1959	Frank Norton	Australian and New Zealand Ships of Today	Angus and Robertson	
1959	Eve Pownall	Exploring Australia	Methuen	
1959	Patricia Wrightson	The Bunyip Hole	Angus and Robertson	

=== 1960s ===
Year	Author	Title	Publisher	Ref.
1960	Dale Collins	Anzac Adventure	Angus and Robertson	
1960	Eleanor Spence	The Summer in Between	Oxford University Press	
1960	Norman Barnett Tindale and H. A. Lindsay	Rangatira	Rigby	
1961	Alan Aldous	Doctor With Wings	Brockhampton	
1961	Elyne Mitchell	Silver Brumby's Daughter	Hutchinson	
1961	Eleanor Spence	Lillipilly Hill	Oxford University Press	
1962	Ruth Park	The Hole in the Hill	Ure Smith	
1962	Betty Roland	The Forbidden Bridge	Bodley Head	
1962	Colin Thiele	Sun on the Stubble	Rigby	
1964	Nan Chauncy	The Roaring 40	Oxford University Press	
1964	Joan Phipson	Threat to the Barkers	Angus and Robertson	
1964	Colin Thiele	Storm Boy	Rigby	
1965	Nan Chauncy	High and Haunted Island	Oxford University Press	
1965	Mary Durack	The Courteous Savage	Nelson	
1965	Nuri Mass	The Wonderland of Nature	Writers' Press	
1965	Elyne Mitchell	Winged Skis	Hutchinson	
1965	Carol Odell	A Day at the Zoo	Angus and Robertson	
1965	Betty Roland	Jamie's Summer Visitor	Bodley Head	
1966	Reginald Ottley	By the Sandhills of Yamboorah	Deutsch	
1966	Ivan Southall	Indonesian Journey	Lansdowne Press	
1966	Eleanor Spence	The Year of the Currawong	Oxford University Press	
1966	Colin Thiele	February Dragon	Rigby	
1967	Max Fatchen	The River Kings	Hicks Smith	
1967	Reginald Ottley	The Roan Colt of Yamboorah	Deutsch	
1967	Celia Syred	Cocky's Castle	Angus and Robertson	
1968	H. F. Brinsmead	A Sapphire for September	Oxford University Press	
1968	Nan Chauncy	Mathinna's People	Oxford University Press	
1968	Mavis Thorpe Clark	Blue Above the Trees	Lansdowne	
1968	Ivan Southall	The Fox Hole	Hicks Smith	
1968	Randolph Stow	Midnite	F. W. Cheshire	
1969	George Finkel	The Loyall Virginian	Angus and Robertson	
1969	John Goode	Wood, Wire and Fabric	Lansdowne	
1969	Jack Pollard	Cricket the Australian Way	Lansdowne	
1969	Robert Shaw	Wandjina: Children of the Dream Time	Jacaranda	
1969	Ivan Southall	Let the Balloon Go	Methuen Hicks Smith	
1969	Phil and Noel Wallace	Children of the Desert	Nelson	
1969	Patricia Wrightson	I Own the Racecourse	Hutchinson	

=== 1970s ===
Year	Author	Title	Publisher	Ref.
1970	Diedre Hill	Over the Bridge	Hutchinson	
1970	Marjory O'Dea	Six Days Between a Second	Heinemann	
1970	Reginald Ottley	The Bates Family	Collins	
1970	P. W. Smith	Ombley-Gombley	Angus and Robertson	
1970	Ivan Southall	Finn's Folly	Angus and Robertson	
1970	Colin Thiele	Blue Fin	Rigby	
1971	George Finkel	James Cook, Royal Navy	Angus and Robertson	
1971	Hui-min Lo	The Story of China	Angus and Robertson	
1971	Lilith Norman	Climb a Lonely Hill	Collins	
1972	David Martin	Hughie	Nelson	
1972	Christobel Mattingley	The Windmill at Magpie Creek	Brockhampton Press	
1973	Meredith Hooper	Everyday Inventions	Hutchinson	
1973	Patricia Wrightson	An Older Kind of Magic	Angus and Robertson	

== See also ==
- List of CBCA Awards
- List of Australian literary awards
