= 1973 in Australian literature =

This article presents a list of the historical events and publications of Australian literature during 1973.

== Events ==
- Patrick White is awarded the Nobel Prize in Literature, becoming the first, and so far only, Australian writer to be presented with the award.

== Major publications ==
=== Books ===
- Kit Denton – The Breaker : A Novel
- Hammond Innes – Golden Soak
- Morris Lurie – Rappaport's Revenge
- Christina Stead – The Little Hotel
- F. J. Thwaites – Tracks I Knew Not
- Morris West – The Salamander
- Patrick White – The Eye of the Storm

=== Short stories ===
- Murray Bail – "Zoellner's Definition"
- Elizabeth Jolley – "Another Holiday for the Prince"
- Frank Moorhouse
  - "The Airport, the Pizzeria, the Motel, the Rented Car, and the Mysteries of Life"
  - The Illegal Relatives
- Fay Zwicky – "Hostages"

=== Children's and Young Adult fiction ===
- James Aldridge – A Sporting Proposition
- Mavis Thorpe Clark – Wildfire
- Max Fatchen – The Spirit Wind
- Elyne Mitchell – Silver Brumby Whirlwind
- Mary Elwyn Patchett – Roar of the Lion
- Ivan Southall – Matt and Jo
- Eleanor Spence – Time to Go Home
- Colin Thiele – The Fire in the Stone
- Patricia Wrightson – The Nargun and the Stars

=== Poetry ===
- Rosemary Dobson – Selected Poems
- Rodney Hall – A Soapbox Omnibus
- A. D. Hope
  - "Hay Fever"
  - Selected Poems
- Roger McDonald – "Two Summers in Moravia"
- Peter Porter – Jonah (with Arthur Boyd)
- Vivian Smith – "The Man Fern Near the Bus Stop"
- Judith Wright – Alive : Poems 1971-72

=== Drama ===
- Ron Blair – President Wilson in Paris
- Peter Kenna – A Hard God
- John Powers – The Last of the Knucklemen
- David Williamson – What If You Died Tomorrow?

== Awards and honours ==
=== Literary ===
Award	Author	Title	Publisher
ALS Gold Medal	Francis Webb		
Colin Roderick Award	Dorothy Green	Ulysses Bound: Henry Handel Richardson and Her Fiction	Australian National University Press
Miles Franklin Award	No award		

=== Children and Young Adult ===
Award	Category	Author	Title	Publisher
Children's Book of the Year Award	Older Readers	Noreen Shelley, illustrated by Robert Micklewright	Family at The Lookout	Oxford University Press
Children's Book of the Year Award	Picture Book	No award		

=== Science fiction and fantasy ===
Award	Category	Author	Title	Publisher
Australian SF Achievement Award	Best Australian Science Fiction	John Foyster	"Let it Ring"	Infinity Three

=== Poetry ===
Award	Author	Title	Publisher
Grace Leven Prize for Poetry	Rodney Hall	A Soapbox Omnibus	University of Queensland Press

=== Drama ===
Award	Author	Title
AWGIE Award for Stage	David Williamson	Don's Party

== Births ==
A list, ordered by date of birth (and, if the date is either unspecified or repeated, ordered alphabetically by surname) of births in 1973 of Australian literary figures, authors of written works or literature-related individuals follows, including year of death.

- 18 March — Max Barry, novelist
- 26 October — Chloe Hooper, author
- 12 November — Jay Kristoff, fantasy and science fiction writer

== Deaths ==
A list, ordered by date of death (and, if the date is either unspecified or repeated, ordered alphabetically by surname) of deaths in 1973 of Australian literary figures, authors of written works or literature-related individuals follows, including year of birth.

- 20 April – Michael Dransfield, poet (born 1948)
- 24 July — Isabel Mary Mitchell, novelist (born 1893)
- 25 July – Gina Ballantyne, poet (born 1919)
- 30 September — Doris Egerton Jones, novelist (born 1889)
- 24 October — Pat Hanna, dramatist (born 1888)
- 11 November — Jim Crawford, playwright (born 1908)
- 23 November – Francis Webb, poet (born 1925)

== See also ==
- 1973 in Australia
- 1973 in literature
- 1973 in poetry
- List of years in Australian literature
- List of years in literature
