= Margaret Horder =

Australian artist and book illustrator

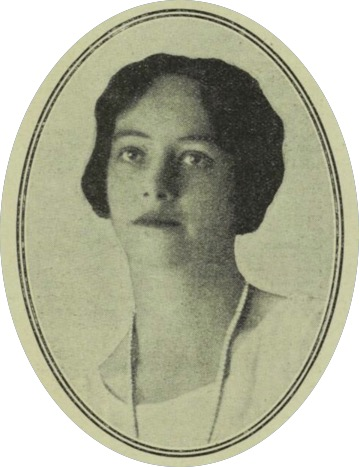
- Horder in 1929
- Born: 12 December 1903; Burwood, New South Wales, Australia
- Died: 26 September 1978 (aged 74)
- Education: Studied with Albert Collins, Julian Ashton, and Smith and Julius (the commercial art studio founded by Sydney Ure Smith and Harry Julius); Redlands, Sydney Church of England Co-educational Grammar School
- Known for: Children’s book illustrator and Australian Artist
- Notable work: Illustrated award-winning books by Nan Chauncy, Joan Phipson and Patricia Wrightson
- Spouse: Arthur Freeman
- Parents: Thomas Horder (father); Elsie I'Anson (née Bloomfield) Horder (mother)

Margaret Horder (12 December 1903 – 26 September 1978) was an Australian artist and children's book illustrator. She is best known for illustrating books by Joan Phipson, Patricia Wrightson and Nan Chauncy.

== Career ==
Horder was born in Burwood, New South Wales, on 12 December 1903, to Thomas and Elsie I'Anson (née Bloomfield) Horder. She was educated by governesses at home until the age of twelve when she was sent to Redlands. She left school at 16 to study first with Albert Collins and then spent three years with Julian Ashton, with whom she studied drawing, life and water-colour. She then spent two years with Smith and Julius, the commercial art studio founded by Sydney Ure Smith and Harry Julius.

Her illustrations began appearing in The Home in the early 1920s and then she was recruited by The Sun and moved to Melbourne. After a stint at The Sun she returned to Sydney and set up her own studio, where she worked alongside Betty Rogers, who had trained with her and also acted as her model.

The first book that Horder illustrated was Babber Ballads, by W. S. Philbert in 1924. A review in The News wrote that her illustrations "are by far the best part of the book – these are distinctly clever and original", while the Sydney Mail said she "has a gifted pencil and has caught the humour of the verses with spirit and success".

In 1929 Horder left Sydney for California to visit her married sister. She later travelled to Europe, where she worked on commissions for Philips in Holland, before moving to London. There, in the 1930s, her focus was on creating posters, in particular for the Great Northern Railway Company.

While in England she was employed as an illustrator by Oxford University Press and other publishers, and worked on a number of books by Dorita Fairlie Bruce and Elsie J. Oxenham, among others.

She returned to Australia in 1948 with her husband, fellow artist Arthur Freeman. Also onboard the Asturias was author Dale Collins who commissioned Horder to illustrate his book, The Vanishing Boy.

Horder illustrated award-winning books by Nan Chauncy, Joan Phipson and Patricia Wrightson. She also worked for the New South Wales School Magazine from 1958 to 1969.

She and husband retired to Palma Majorca in 1973 but returned to Australia four years later. She died on 26 September 1978.

Two boxes of her drawings (1950–1969) and the manuscript of a talk given by Noreen Shelley in 1975 are held by the National Library of Australia.

== Works illustrated ==
- Babber Ballads by W. S. Philbert, 1924
- Six books in Elsie J. Oxenham's Abbey Connectors, 1940–1950
- Five books in Elsie J. Oxenham's Abbey Series, 1945–1950
- Six books by Dorita Fairlie Bruce, 1943–1952
- They Found a Cave by Nan Chauncy, 1948
- The Vanishing Boy by Dale Collins, 1949
- Good Luck to the Rider by Joan Phipson, 1953 (1953 joint winner, Children's Book of the Year Award: Older Readers)
- The Crooked Snake by Patricia Wrightson, 1955 (1956 winner, Children's Book of the Year Award: Older Readers)
- Tiger in the Bush by Nan Chauncy, 1957 (1958 winner, Children's Book of the Year Award: Older Readers)
- It Happened One Summer by Joan Phipson, 1957 (1958 highly commended, Children's Book of the Year Award: Older Readers)
- The Family Conspiracy by Joan Phipson, 1962 (1963 winner, Children's Book of the Year Award: Older Readers)
- I Own the Race Course! by Patricia Wrightson, 1968
