= 1948 in Australian literature =

This article presents a list of the historical events and publications of Australian literature during 1948.

== Books ==
- Eleanor Dark – Storm of Time
- George Johnston – The Moon at Perigee
- Jack Lindsay – Men of Forty-Eight
- Alan Moorehead – The Rage of the Vulture
- Vance Palmer – Golconda
- Ruth Park – The Harp in the South
- Katharine Susannah Prichard – Golden Miles
- Nevil Shute – No Highway
- Christina Stead – A Little Tea, a Little Chat
- F. J. Thwaites – The Night Closed Down
- E. V. Timms – Forever to Remain
- Patrick White – The Aunt's Story

== Short stories ==
- A. Bertram Chandler – "Dawn of Nothing"
- Helen Meggs – "Burning Off"
- Judah Waten – "Black Girl in the Street"

== Crime and mystery ==
- George Johnston – Death Takes Small Bites
- Arthur Upfield
  - An Author Bites the Dust
  - The Mountains Have a Secret
- June Wright – Murder in the Telephone Exchange

== Children's and Young Adult fiction ==
- Nan Chauncy – They Found a Cave
- Frank Hurley – Shackleton's Argonauts : A Saga of the Antarctic Ice-Pack

== Poetry ==
- David Campbell – "The End of Exploring"
- Dulcie Deamer – The Silver Branch : Twenty-Seven Poems
- Rosemary Dobson
  - "Carried Away"
  - "On a Tapestry"
  - The Ship of Ice : With Other Poems
- Mary Gilmore – Selected Verse
- Nan McDonald – "The Barren Ground"
- Kenneth Mackenzie – "The Children Go"
- Elizabeth Riddell – Poems
- Roland Robinson
  - "Swift"
  - "Would I Might Find My Country"
- Douglas Stewart – Glencoe
- Francis Webb
  - A Drum for Ben Boyd
  - "For My Grandfather"
- Judith Wright
  - "Train Journey"
  - "Wonga Vine"

== Drama ==
=== Radio ===
- Sumner Locke Elliott – Wicked is the Vine
- Musette Morell – Three Radio Plays
- Vance Palmer – Christine

=== Theatre ===
- Sumner Locke Elliott – Rusty Bugles
- Musette Morell – Bush Cobbers
- Ruth Park – The Uninvited Guest

== Biography ==
- Henry Handel Richardson – Myself When Young

== Children's and Young Adults non-fiction ==
- Frank Hurley – Shackleton's Argonauts : A Saga of the Antarctic Icepacks

== Awards and honours ==
=== Literary ===
Award	Author	Title	Publisher
ALS Gold Medal	Herz Bergner	Between Sky and Sea	Dolphin Publications

=== Children's and Young Adult ===
Award	Category	Author	Title	Publisher
Children's Book of the Year Award	Older Readers	Frank Hurley	Shackleton's Argonauts : A Saga of the Antarctic Icepacks	Angus and Robertson

=== Poetry ===
Award	Author	Title	Publisher
Grace Leven Prize for Poetry	Francis Webb	A Drum for Ben Boyd	Angus and Robertson

== Births ==
A list, ordered by date of birth (and, if the date is either unspecified or repeated, ordered alphabetically by surname) of births in 1948 of Australian literary figures, authors of written works or literature-related individuals follows, including year of death.

- 16 February – Jeff Guess, poet
- 18 March – Di Morrissey, novelist
- 20 March – Dianne Bates, writer for children
- 27 March – David Dale, journalist and travel writer (died 2025)
- 2 April – Jennifer Rowe, novelist
- 23 April – John A. Scott, novelist
- 20 May – Kate Jennings, novelist and poet (died 2021)
- 23 July – Alan Wearne, poet
- 24 July — Joan London, novelist
- 12 September – Michael Dransfield, poet (died 1973)
- 21 September – Sean McMullen, novelist
- 25 September – Vicki Viidikas, poet and writer (died 1998)
- 2 November – Jenny Pausacker, novelist

Unknown date

- Roger Bennett, playwright (died 1997)
- Pam Brown, poet
- Jimmy Chi, playwright and composer (died 2017)
- Martin Duwell, editor
- Dennis Haskell, poet
- Dorothy Johnston, novelist
- Margaret Wild, writer for children (in South Africa)

== Deaths ==
A list, ordered by date of death (and, if the date is either unspecified or repeated, ordered alphabetically by surname) of deaths in 1948 of Australian literary figures, authors of written works or literature-related individuals follows, including year of birth.

- 20 May – Marie E. J. Pitt, poet (born 1869)
- 26 September — R. J. Cassidy, poet (born 1880)

== See also ==
- 1948 in Australia
- 1948 in literature
- 1948 in poetry
- List of years in Australian literature
- List of years in literature
