= Brett Porter =

Australian producer, writer and director & TV pioneer

Brett Porter (1913 – July 1970) was an Australian producer, writer and director best known for his work in TV. He worked at ATN-7 Sydney producing with David Cahill some of the first drama made for Australian television.

He moved to the ABC in 1964, where he directed documentaries and worked on the current affairs prestige program Four Corners. He then became the first executive producer of the popular serial Bellbird and served as the vice president of the Producers and Directors' Guild, of which he was a foundation member.

Porter's last credit was for the progressive 1969 serial adapting Pastures of the Blue Crane, with its theme of anti-bigotry. He was developing a new religious series when he died in late July 1970 aged 57.

== Select credits ==
- Johnny Belinda (1959) - producer
- Two Men of Fiji (1959) colour documentary - writer and director
- Other People's Houses (1959)
- They Were Big, They Were Blue, They Were Beautiful (1959)
- Thunder of Silence (1959)
- Pardon Miss Westcott (1959)
- Reflections in Dark Glasses (1960)
- Shadow of a Pale Horse (1960) (TV movie, Best Australian Drama Logie Awards of 1961)
- The Story of Peter Grey (1961)
- The Runner (1962) - Director
- Stronger Since the War? (1964) - documentary - writer and director
- Four Corners (1965) - director
- Three Faces of New Guinea (1967) - documentary
- Bellbird (1967) - TV series - producer
- Pastures of the Blue Crane (1969)
