= Bread and Honey =

Book by Ivan Southall

- First edition
- Author: Ivan Southall
- Language: English
- Genre: Children's fiction
- Publisher: Angus and Robertson
- Publication date: 1970
- Publication place: Australia
- Media type: Print
- Pages: 118 pp
- ISBN: 0207954097
- Preceded by: Chinaman's Reef is Ours
- Followed by: Josh

Bread and Honey (1970) is a novel for children by Australian author Ivan Southall, illustrated by Wolfgang Grasse. It won the Children's Book of the Year Award: Older Readers in 1971. It is also known by the alternative title Walk a Mile and Get Nowhere.

== Plot outline ==
Michael Cameron is a thirteen-year-old boy living in a small country town in Australia with his father and grandmother after the death of his mother. On a wet Anzac Day, Michael meets and defends a nine-year-old girl from a local bully, and comes to appreciate the attitude of the adults around him and his place in the world.

== Critical reception ==
Gwen Hutchings in The Canberra Times noted that the lead character's "problems hinge on the introspective and his innocent view of people in an every-day world, until the sham of it all is revealed in a moment of truth and he is a better person for knowing it. The idea shows purpose and the narrative is less emotional than in some previous novels."

== See also ==
- 1970 in Australian literature
