= A Soapbox Omnibus =

Poetry collection by Rodney Hall

- Author: Rodney Hall
- Language: English
- Publisher: University of Queensland Press
- Publication date: 1973
- Publication place: Australia
- Media type: Print
- Pages: 61p
- ISBN: 0702208825

A Soapbox Omnibus (1973) is a collection of poetry by Australian writer Rodney Hall. It won the Grace Leven Prize for Poetry in 1973.

The collection consists of 36 poems, most with their original publication in this book, and some of which were had been previously published in The Australian newspaper, and magazines such as The Bulletin, Hemisphere, Quadrant, and Southerly, and various Australian poetry collections.

== Contents ==
- "Confession"
- "The Molecule as Mosaic", poetry sequence
  - "In Defence of a Taste for Ruins (The Ancient)"
  - "The Medieval"
  - "The Imperial"
  - "Looking Back"
  - "Looking Round"
  - "Dedication"
- "Journey"
- "The Three Wise Men Disencumbered of Gifts"
- "Decline of the Moghals (at the Red Fort, Delhi)"
- "Calcutta"
- "Retarded Child (for Irene)"
- "Elegy for the Funeral of Michael Dransfield"
- "Australia"
- "Twelve Environment Studies", poetry sequence
  - "Spain"
  - "England"
  - "France"
  - "Australia"
  - "City"
  - "Suburb with Television"
  - "The Monument Syndrome"
  - "The Fate of Romance"
  - "The Absence of Environment"
  - "Inscape"
  - "Memory As Environment"
- "Merlin in His Tower of Air"
- "I Ought to Know Better"
- "Lapse of Contract"
- "I'm Sick of Hearing about People Who Enjoy Being in Pain"
- "End of an Empire"
- "The Mathematician Sceptical of All Things but Mathematics Finds"
- "Heredity"
- "Wedding Day at Nagasaki"
- "Folk Tales : Seven Contraries"

== Critical reception ==
Writing in The Age reviewer R. A. Simpson noted that this collection represented "a step forward" from the poet's previous collection. They especially appreciated the opening sequence of poems calling it "one of Hall's most accomplished pieces of writing" as it dealt with "the tragic aspects of Man in society."

== Awards ==
- 1973 - winner Grace Leven Prize for Poetry

== See also ==
- 1973 in literature
- 1973 in Australian literature
