= Shackleton's Argonauts =

Book by Frank Hurley

Shackleton's Argonauts : A Saga of the Antarctic Ice-Pack
- First edition
- Author: Frank Hurley
- Language: English
- Genre: Children's non-fiction
- Publisher: Angus and Robertson
- Publication date: 1948
- Publication place: Australia
- Media type: Print
- Pages: 140pp
- Preceded by: Pearls and Savages : Adventures in the Air, on Land and Sea - in New Guinea
- Followed by: The Diaries of Frank Hurley 1912-1941

Shackleton's Argonauts: A Saga of the Antarctic Ice-Pack (1948) is a children's information book by Australian photographer and explorer Frank Hurley. Hurley also illustrated the book and won the Children's Book of the Year Award: Older Readers in 1948.

== Book summary ==
Frank Hurley was the official photographer attached to Ernest Shackleton's 1914 expedition to the Antarctic. Known as the Imperial Trans-Antarctic Expedition, Shackleton aimed to ship his party to the head of the Weddell Sea and then cross the continent to the Ross Sea with a small party by dog sledge. But things went wrong from the start when their ship, the Endurance, was caught and crushed in ice-packs. After months of surviving on the ice, the expedition finally reached Elephant Island. From there Shackleton undertook an open-boat journey to South Georgia to organise a rescue, which, after some months and several attempts, was finally successful.

Hurley saved some negatives from the expedition and used a number to illustrate the book.

== Critical reception ==
Geoffrey Hutton in The Argus found the book a simple tale told well: "This is a plain tale told by a famous Australian explorer of the near-disaster which befell Shackleton's dauntless company when the Endurance was crushed by pack-ice in the Weddell Sea...Hurley travelled with Shackleton as official photographer, a role he had filled in Mawson's expedition of 1911-14, and his book is enriched by a magnificent pictorial record of the Antarctic. This series largely paid off the expedition's backers. His name, and that of his famous leader, are a reminder that Australia has played an important role in exploring the continent from which our weather is largely dictated, and in which we lay claim to an area almost as large as Australia itself."

== See also ==
- 1948 in Australian literature
