= The Min-Min =

1966 children's novel by Mavis Thorpe Clark

- Author: Mavis Thorpe Clark
- Language: English
- Genre: children's fiction
- Publisher: Lansdowne Press, Melbourne
- Publication date: 1966
- Publication place: Australia
- Media type: Print
- Pages: 206 pp
- Preceded by: They Came South
- Followed by: Blue Above the Trees

The Min-Min is a 1966 children's novel by Australian author Mavis Thorpe Clark, illustrated by Genevieve Melrose. It won the Children's Book of the Year Award: Older Readers in 1967.

== Plot outline ==
Set in a squalid fettlers' siding on the east-west railway just south of Woomera, this novel follows the story of Sylvie Edwards and her younger brother Reg. After Reg destroys a teacher's record player the two children set off across the desert to the Tuckers' homestead.

== Critical reception ==
Reviewing the novel in The Canberra Times Elizabeth Bray was disappointed with the book: "The author seems to have attempted to write the story on two levels - as an adventure story, and as the portrait of a girl passing from childhood into adolescence. The second aspect is tenuously linked with the "min-min", a light seen in the desert night sky; as the blurb puts it "the gleam in the dark is symbolic of her life and future". In spite of this, Sylvie's character remains one-dimensional."

== See also ==
- 1966 in Australian literature
