= Claire Zorn =

Australian writer of young adult fiction

- Born: Penrith, New South Wales
- Occupation: Writer
- Education: University of Technology Sydney
- Genre: Young adult fiction
- Notable works: The Sky So Heavy; The Protected
- Notable awards: CBCA Book of the Year (2015, 2017)

Claire Zorn (born in Penrith, New South Wales) is an Australian writer of young adult fiction. She was awarded the CBCA Children's Book of the Year Award: Older Readers in 2015 and 2017.

== Personal life ==
Zorn grew up in the Blue Mountains and attended St Columba's Catholic College. She holds a Bachelor of Fine Arts and a post graduate diploma in writing from University of Technology Sydney. As a writer of both fiction and non-fiction, her work has been published in literary journals including Wet Ink and the Overland Literary Journal, and she blogs. She is a Christian and has spoken publicly about how her faith influences her writing. She says she tries to view her characters with the same compassion and judgement as Christ views people.

== Published works and awards ==
- The Sky So Heavy (2013). University of Queensland Press. ISBN 9780702249761Set in the Blue Mountains, Zorn's first novel tells the story of a group of teenagers struggling to survive a nuclear winter.
  - Honour Book 2014 Children's Book Council of Australia Award for Older Readers
  - Shortlisted 2014 Inky Gold Award
  - Shortlisted 2014 Aurealis Awards – Best Young Adult Novel
  - Shortlisted 2015 REAL Children's Choice Award – Fiction for Years 7-9
- The Protected (2014). University of Queensland Press. ISBN 9780702250194
  - Winner, Prime Minister's Literary Awards 2015 – Young Adult Fiction
  - Winner of the 2015 Victorian Premier's Literary Award for Young Adult
  - Winner, 2015 CBCA Book of the Year for Older Readers
  - Shortlisted, 2015 Inky Gold Award
  - Selected in New Zealand Listener's Top 50 Children's Books for 2014
- One Would Think the Deep (2016). University of Queensland Press. ISBN 9780702253942 A novel about a 17-year-old boy learning to deal with the death of his mother and life in a small coastal town.
  - Winner, 2017 CBCA Book of the Year for Older Readers
- When We Are Invisible (2021). University of Queensland Press. ISBN 9780702263132. Sequel to The Sky So Heavy.
  - Shortlisted, 2022 Adelaide Festival Awards for Literature – Young Adult Fiction Award
