= Good Luck to the Rider =

1953 children's book

- First edition
- Author: Joan Phipson
- Language: English
- Genre: Children's fiction
- Publisher: Angus and Robertson
- Publication date: 1953
- Publication place: Australia
- Media type: Print
- Pages: 149pp
- Followed by: Six and Silver

Good Luck to the Rider (1953) is the first children's book by Australian author Joan Phipson; it was illustrated by Margaret Horder. It was joint winner of the Children's Book of the Year Award: Older Readers in 1953.

== Story outline ==
Barbara Trevor is the youngest of four children living on their parents' farm in country Australia. Barbara has acquired a horse, which she calls Rosinante, though she doesn't know the origin of the name. The book follows her attempts to school her horse and come to terms with her own life.

== Critical reception ==
In a survey of children's books to signal the commencement of Children's Book Week in 1953 a reviewer in The Sunday Herald (Sydney) stated: "Australian country life is well described in a wholesome story. All the characters ring true. The Trevors are an unaffected family. Their homestead is typical of many in this broad land, and the four children act and live like normal children...There are no contrived adventures; it is a natural, easy flowing story which will entertain and absorb the attention of its readers. Margaret Horder's illustrations have caught the spirit of the book, and particularly of Rosinante." Kirkus Reviews praised the author's handling of the material: "When uncertain girl meets unwanted horse, it's bound to be love at first sight, confidence in the last chapter, but with Joan Phipson putting the familiar plot through its paces almost every moment counts".

== Awards ==
- 1953 - winner Children's Book of the Year Award: Older Readers

== See also ==
- 1953 in Australian literature
