= H. A. Lindsay =

Australian writer for children

- Born: Harold Arthur Lindsay; 13 November 1900; Hyde Park, South Australia
- Died: 4 December 1969 (aged 69); Highgate, South Australia
- Occupations: novelist, and writer for children
- Writing career
- Language: English
- Years active: 1915-1964
- Notable work: The First Walkabout
- Notable awards: Children's Book of the Year Award: Older Readers

H. A. Lindsay (1900–1969) was an Australian writer of novels, short stories, newspaper articles, and children's books. He was born in Hyde Park, South Australia.

== Life and career ==
Born Harold Arthur Lindsay, he was educated at Kyre College (now Scotch College, Adelaide).

Lindsay travelled widely in Australia before working as a commercial bee-keeper and farmer leading up to the Second World War. He enlisted in the Australian Imperial Force in 1942 and rose to warrant officer, class one, in the Australian Army Education Service where he taught the bushcraft he had learned on his pre-war travels.

After the war he became a full-time writer and broadcaster, writing regular columns for the Melbourne Age and Adelaide Sunday Advertiser newspapers, and for The Port Phillip Gazette.

He wrote five novels for adults and was awarded the Children's Book of the Year Award: Older Readers for his work The First Walkabout which he wrote with Norman B Tindale and published in 1954.

He died in Highgate, South Australia in 1969.

== Bibliography ==
=== Novels ===
- The Red Bull (1959)
- Sweeps the Wide Earth (1960)
- Janie McLachlan (1961)
- Faraway Hill (1963)
- And Gifts Misspent (1964)

=== Young adult fiction ===
- The Arnhem Treasure (1952)
- The First Walkabout (1954) with Norman B Tindale
- Rangatira (1960) with Norman B Tindale

=== Non-fiction ===
- Aboriginal Australians (1963) with Norman B Tindale
- "The Bushman's Handbook" First edition 1948 Second edition 1951 Third Edition (Revised and reset) 1963
