= A Drum for Ben Boyd =

1948 book by Francis Webb

- First edition
- Author: Francis Webb
- Language: English
- Publisher: Angus and Robertson
- Publication date: 1948
- Publication place: Australia
- Media type: Print (hardback)
- Pages: 37p
- Followed by: Leichhardt in Theatre

A Drum for Ben Boyd (1948) is a long, narrative poem by Australian poet Francis Webb. It won the Grace Leven Prize for Poetry in 1948.

The poem consists of fifteen numbered parts, some with titles, and some of which had been previously published in The Bulletin magazine and various Australian poetry collections. The book also includes illustrations by Australian artist Norman Lindsay.

== Contents ==
- "'From Our Roving Reporter'"
- "Author's Prologue"
- [Untitled]
- "A Boat Builder"
- "Journalist"
- [Untitled]
- "Sir Oswald Brierly"
- "A Whaler"
- "A Papuan Shepherd"
- [Untitled]
- "Politician"
- "A Pioneer of Monaro"
- [Untitled]
- "The Captain of the Oberon"
- "John Webster"

== Notes ==
Author's note: "Benjamin Boyd, a Scotsman, came to New South Wales in 1848. Possessing either unlimited wealth or unlimited credit, he invaded the financial system of the colony with amazing ease, winning over many incautious speculators, founding banks, and actually building his own town at Twofold Bay. His brief career almost ended in bankruptcy, and finally he disappeared on a lone shooting expedition at Guadalcanal. The Oberon, chartered to discover some trace of him, returned with a skull, which was later proved to be that of a native."

== Critical reception ==
A reviewer in The Advertiser stated: "Francis Webb's method is to gather a set of characters together and — with little of his own narrative — allow them to speak their impressions of Boyd. The result is an entertaining hotch-potch, with a current of serious and imaginative thought. The poetry is free and modern in sound, without eccentricity. It reads plainly, but has excitement and vigor.."

The Sydney Morning Herald reviewer was impressed by the work: "Every person in the narrative sequence speaks with the colour of his type. Characterisation is more difficult in poetry than in prose, but Webb has presented each of them splendidly and from them built the significance of'fhe greater character of Boyd."

== Awards ==
- 1948 - winner Grace Leven Prize for Poetry

== See also ==
- 1948 in literature
- 1948 in Australian literature
