= Margaret Balderson =

Australian novelist and children's writer

- Born: 1935 (age 90–91); Concord, New South Wales
- Occupation: novelist
- Writing career
- Language: English
- Years active: 1968–
- Notable work: When Jays Fly to Barbmo
- Notable awards: Children's Book of the Year Award: Older Readers 1969

Margaret Balderson is an Australian novelist and writer for children who was born in Concord, New South Wales in 1935. She won the 1969 Children's Book of the Year Award: Older Readers award for her debut novel When Jays Fly to Barbmo.

Balderson attended Fort Street High School before commencing library work. She undertook a working holiday to Europe in the 1960s and travelled to and worked in Norway where she gathered material for her debut novel.

Following her return to Australia she worked as resident house-mistress and librarian at Frensham School, Mittagong, NSW.

== Novels ==
- When Jays Fly to Barbmo, illustrated by Victor G. Ambrus (1968)
- A Dog Called George (1975)
- Blue and Gold Day, illustrated by Roger Haldane (1979)
- Sea Bird with Elizabeth Smith (2002)
- Junkyard Dogs, illustrated by Janine Dawson (2002)

== Awards ==
- 1969 – winner Children's Book of the Year Award: Older Readers, When Jays Fly to Barbmo
- 1969 – runner-up Carnegie Medal, When Jays Fly to Barbmo
- 1976 – highly commended Children's Book of the Year Award: Older Readers, A Dog Called George
