= Thurley Fowler =

Australian author (1925–2024)

- Born: 21 March 1925; Griffith, New South Wales, Australia
- Died: 7 May 2024 (aged 99); Frankston, Victoria, Australia
- Occupation: Writer for children
- Writing career
- Language: English
- Years active: 1981–1999
- Notable work: The Green Wind
- Notable awards: 1986 Children's Book of the Year Award: Older Readers

Thurley Fowler (21 March 1925 – 7 May 2024) was an Australian writer for children.

== Biography ==
Fowler was born in Griffith, New South Wales on 21 March 1925. She grew up in the Murrumbidgee irrigation area, before moving to Melbourne where she raised her family. Fowler died in Frankston, Victoria on 7 May 2024, at the age of 99.

== Bibliography ==
- Wait For Me! Wait For Me! (1981)
- Fall of a Clown (1982)
- The Green Wind (1985)
- Am I Going With You? (1985)
- A Hippo Doing Backstrkes (1988)
- The Kid from Licorice Hill (1988)
- There's a Bushranger in My Bedroom (1990)
- The Wind is Silver (1991)
- The Light from Nowhere (1993)
- Journey to a Dream (1993)
- Not Again, Dad! (1994)
- The Caretakers (1994)
- A Brat Called Annie (1997)
- Hello World, It's Me (1999)

== Awards ==
- 1986 Children's Book of the Year: Older Readers Award for The Green Wind
