= Fiona Wood (writer) =

Australian young adult author

Fiona Anna Wood
- Education: University of Melbourne
- Occupation: Writer of young adult fiction
- Awards: Three-time winner of the Children's Book of the Year Award: Older Readers award. Winner, CBCA Book of the Year, Older Readers, 2014 Winner, Indie Award, Best Young Adult (Independent Booksellers Awards), 2016
- Honours: Honour book, Kids Own Australian Literature Awards (KOALAs), Fiction for years 7–9, 2015

Fiona Anna Wood is an Australian writer of young adult fiction. She is a three-time winner of the Children's Book of the Year Award: Older Readers award.

== Career ==
Fiona Wood is a graduate of the University of Melbourne. She worked for 12 years as a scriptwriter for television series, including episodes of Neighbours, Home and Away and MDA, before her first novel, Six Impossible Things, was published in 2010.

== Works ==
- Wood, Fiona (2010). Six impossible things. Pan Macmillan. ISBN 978-0-330-42606-0.
- Wood, Fiona (2013). Wildlife. Pan Macmillan Australia. ISBN 978-1-74261-231-7.
- Wood, Fiona (2015). Cloudwish. Pan Macmillan. ISBN 978-1-74353-985-9.
- Crowley, Cath; Howell, Simmone; Wood, Fiona (2017). Take three girls (First ed.). Pan Macmillan. ISBN 978-1-74261-274-4.
- Wood, Fiona (2022). How to Spell Catastrophe. Pan Macmillan. ISBN 978-1-76098-490-8.
- Wood, Fiona (2026). The Boy and the Dog Tree. University of Queensland Press. ISBN 978-0-70226-922-6.

== Awards and recognition ==
- Six Impossible Things
  - Winner, Eleanor Dark Flagship Fellowship for Fiction, 2008
  - Shortlisted, CBCA (Children’s Book Council of Australia) Book of the Year, Older Readers, 2011
  - Shortlisted, YABBA (Young Australians Best Book Awards), 2014
  - Shortlisted, YABBA (Young Australians Best Book Awards), 2016
- Wildlife
  - Shortlisted, Queensland Literary Awards, Young Adult Book Award, 2013
  - Shortlisted, Victorian Premier's Literary Awards, Young Adult Fiction Award, 2014
  - Shortlisted, NSW Premier's Literary Award, Ethel Turner Prize, 2014
  - Winner, CBCA Book of the Year, Older Readers, 2014
  - Shortlisted, Reading & Enjoying Australian Literature (REAL) Awards, Fiction for Year 7–9, 2015
  - Honour book, Kids Own Australian Literature Awards (KOALAs), Fiction for years 7–9, 2015
- Cloudwish
  - Winner, Indie Award, Best Young Adult (Independent Booksellers Awards), 2016
  - Winner, CBCA Book of the Year, Older Readers, 2016
  - Shortlisted, ABIA Awards (Australian Book Industry Awards)
  - Shortlisted, WA Young Readers' Book Award
- Take Three Girls
  - Winner, CBCA, Book of the Year, Older Readers, 2018
  - Shortlisted, Gold Inky Award
  - Shortlisted, Indie Award (Independent Booksellers Awards)
- How to Spell Catastrophe
  - Shortlisted, Children's Peace Literature Award (2023)
