= The October Child =

1976 novel by Eleanor Spence

- Author: Eleanor Spence
- Language: English
- Genre: Children's fiction
- Publisher: Oxford University Press
- Publication date: 1976
- Publication place: Australia
- Media type: Print
- Pages: 151 pp
- ISBN: 0192713841

The October Child (1976) is a novel for children by Australian author Eleanor Spence. It was originally published in Australia by Oxford University Press with illustrations by Malcolm Green.

It won the Children's Book of the Year Award: Older Readers in 1977.

== Plot outline ==
Carl is the fourth child of the Mariner family, and he is autistic. When his condition is diagnosed the family moves from its home on the coast north of Sydney down to the big city. The novel follows the challenges the family faces, not only with caring for Carl, but also with the major change of household location.

== Critical reception ==
Writing about Spence's books for children, Walter McVitty noted that the author's experience of working as an aide at a centre for autistic children certainly informed the work, and the information imparted "adds to one's range of understanding or people and problems, just as does the author's skill in representing family life while allowing for individual studies within it." He concluded that the book "can take its place with the finest of children's literature."

== See also ==
- 1976 in Australian literature
