= The Racketty Street Gang =

Book by L. H. Evers

- Author: L. H. Evers
- Language: English
- Genre: Children's fiction
- Publisher: Hodder & Stoughton
- Publication date: 1961
- Publication place: Australia
- Media type: Print
- Pages: 189pp
- Preceded by: Make Way for Tomorrow
- Followed by: Danny's Wonderful Uncle

The Racketty Street Gang (1961) is a novel for children by Australian author L. H. Evers. It was joint winner of the Children's Book of the Year Award: Older Readers in 1962.

== Plot outline ==
The novel is set in an old Sydney harbour suburb and follows the exploits of a group of young buys who attempt to clear the name of the father of one of them from a war disgrace.

== Critical reception ==
In a round-up of books of the time a reviewer in The Canberra Times in 1961 called the book "a remarkably good yarn". They went on to say: "The author obviously knows these parts well, and his perceptive comments give life and depth to this story...Boys and girls are almost bound to enjoy this story, which I hope finds its way into the list of books for consideration for the 1961 Book of the Year Award."

== Television adaptation ==
The novel was adapted for Australian television over six episodes in 1961. The adaptation was written and directed by Dorothea Brooking and featured John Abineri in the role of Stephan Smertzer.

== See also ==
- 1961 in Australian literature
