= Stronger Since The War =

Stronger Since the War?
- Directed by: Brett Porter
- Written by: Brett Porter
- Produced by: Gil Brealey
- Release date: 1964
- Running time: 53 min
- Country: Australia
- Language: English

Stronger Since the War? is a 1964 Australian documentary film which examines the status of women in Japan following World War 2. It was created by the ABC as part of their contribution to Intertel (The International Television Federation). It was broadcast on the ABC TV on 11 November 1964. The film won the 1965 Australian Film Institute award for Best Documentary.
