= Fly West =

Autobiography by Ivan Southall

- First edition
- Author: Ivan Southall
- Language: English
- Genre: Autobiography
- Publisher: Angus and Robertson
- Publication date: 1974
- Publication place: Australia
- Media type: Print
- Pages: 175 pp
- ISBN: 0207130027

Fly West (1974) is an autobiography written for children by Australian author Ivan Southall. It won the Children's Book of the Year Award: Older Readers in 1976.

== Book outline ==
The book tells the story of Ivan Southall's time as a captain of a Short Sunderland flying boat during World War II.

== Critical reception ==
A reviewer in The Sydney Morning Herald noted: "Fly West is not for those who like to find vicarious excitement in the reading of war books. Ivan Southall gives the truth of the times, and melancholy tinges his account as he writes of men who died, of men who survived to find that evil has triumphed more often than right."

== See also ==
- 1974 in Australian literature

== Notes ==
- Dedication: To Barbara Ker Wilson.
