= Hills End =

1962 children's book by Ivan Southall

- First edition
- Author: Ivan Southall
- Language: English
- Genre: Children's novel
- Publisher: Angus & Robertson, Sydney
- Publication date: 1962
- Publication place: Australia
- Pages: 174 pages

Hills End is a children's book by Ivan Southall published in 1962 and later adapted for television.

== Plot summary ==
The story follows seven children and their teacher who are trapped inside a cave while a fierce cyclonic storm destroys the fictional town of Hills End. They face a struggle to survive as well as having to deal with their loss. A mystery also surrounds ancient aboriginal art found in the cave.

== Literary significance and reception ==
Southall had lost his family farm shortly before the publication of Hills End, but its success established him as a writer both in Australia and internationally.

John Rowe Thompson wrote of the book "Hills End is almost a perfect novel of its kind.... The rapid character development and self-discovery of the children under stress are notable."

Hills End is regarded as a classic of Australian children's literature. The book is studied in Australia in the early years of high school both as a work of literature and to aid discussion on the impact of natural disasters.

== Television adaptation ==
The mini-series Hills End starred Madge Ryan as Miss Godwin, John Noble as Ben Fiddler, Peter Gwynne as Frank Tobias, Maree D'Arcy, Katharine Cullen as Frances McLeod, Clayton Williamson as Adrian Fiddler, Jason Degiorgio as Paul Mace, Emma Fowler as Gussie Mace, Haydon Samuels as Harvey Collins, Caitlin Procter as Maisie Johnson and Keith Eisenhuth as 'Butch' Buchanan. It originally aired on ABC Television in 1989.
