= When Jays Fly to Barbmo =

1968 novel by Margaret Balderson

- Author: Margaret Balderson
- Language: English
- Genre: Children's fiction
- Publisher: Oxford University Press
- Publication date: 1968
- Publication place: Australia
- Media type: Print
- Pages: 202 pp
- Preceded by: –
- Followed by: A Dog Called George

When Jays Fly to Barbmo (1968) is the debut novel for children by Australian author Margaret Balderson, illustrated by Victor Ambrus. It won the Children's Book of the Year Award: Older Readers in 1969.

== Plot outline ==
The novel is set on a remote island off the coast of Norway during World War II. It follows the story of 14-year-old Ingeborg who must survive during a long dark winter after her aunt dies and the Nazis take over the island.

== Critical reception ==
In a review of the book in The Canberra Times the reviewer stated: "This distinguished piece of writing is a tremendously individual and quite moving story...There is some overwriting and action occasionally flags, but characterisation, originality and the breadth of the story makes it a most satisfying piece of work. Victor Ambrus has provided some delightful illustrations that in style and character are a true extension of the text."

Kirkus Reviews noted: "The image evoked in the restrictively literary course of Ingeborg's sometimes faltering and always dense story suggests Anne Frank's diary written into a Bartos-Hoppner Siberian wilderness; though destined for only limited response it is an image wrought of violent silence with a rare and relentless grip."

== See also ==
- 1968 in Australian literature
