= Two Men of Fiji =

Two Men of Fiji is a 1959 Australian television documentary. It was directed by Brett Porter for the Shell Film Unit. It was filmed by Hone Glendinning and Roger Mirams in Fiji over a two-month period and was screened theatrically in Fiji.

Notable for reputedly being Fiji's first hour-long colour documentary (Note: Excluding accompanying newsreel and featurette footage of the Royal Visit to Fiji in 1953.) and its location recording of the Lauan language.

== Reception ==
The Sydney Morning Herald said it "freshly and happily captured the spirit of a remote and happy people."
