= Ash Road =

1965 novel by Ivan Southall

- First edition
- Author: Ivan Southall
- Illustrator: Clem Seale
- Language: English
- Genre: children's fiction
- Publisher: Angus and Robertson
- Publication date: 1965
- Publication place: Australia
- Media type: Print
- Pages: 154pp

Ash Road (1965) is a novel for children by Australian author Ivan Southall. It won the Children's Book of the Year Award: Older Readers in 1966.

== Plot outline ==
Three fifteen-year-old boys are for the first time allowed to go on a holiday together without adult supervision. But an accident with a faulty heater causes the surrounding area to catch alight and a bushfire ensues.

== Critical reception ==
Reviewing the novel in The Canberra Times Susan Fuller is full of praise: "There are few children's writers who steel themselves to bring reality, with all its overtones of pain, injustice and frustration, into their stories. Fantasy and even horror, yes, but they seem to find cold, stark real life too strong a meat for their tender readers. Ivan Southall is not of this school...Ash Road is a frightening story of bush fire run riot, and Mr Southall does not pull any punches. The fear and tension is real as the dry brittle forests sigh under the weight of a hot north wind, waiting for that tiny spark to burst into inferno."

== See also ==
- 1965 in Australian literature
