= The Crooked Snake =

Book by Patricia Wrightson

- First edition cover
- Author: Patricia Wrightson
- Cover artist: Margaret Horder
- Language: English
- Genre: Children's fiction
- Publisher: Angus and Robertson
- Publication date: 1955
- Publication place: Australia
- Media type: Print
- Pages: 153pp
- Followed by: The Bunyip Hole

The Crooked Snake (1955) is the first novel by Australian author Patricia Wrightson. The book was illustrated by Margaret Horder. It won the Children's Book of the Year Award: Older Readers in 1956.

== Plot outline ==
A gang of children form a secret society to protect a nearby national park from vandals. They record the bush with a camera and write to the Ministry of Conservation requesting the park be designated a flora and fauna sanctuary.

== Critical reception ==
In a survey of Australian children's books dealing with the Australian bush, Susan Sheridan and Emma Maguire noted: "In their preferred method of research, and in their dealings with the bureaucracy, these children mark out a specifically modern, as well as Australian, mode of the Enid Blyton or Arthur Ransome adventure story in a natural setting."

== See also ==
- 1955 in Australian literature
