= Longtime Passing =

1971 novel by H. F. Brimsmead

- Author: H. F. Brinsmead
- Language: English
- Genre: Children's fiction
- Publisher: Angus and Robertson
- Publication date: 1971
- Publication place: Australia
- Media type: Print
- Pages: 183 pp
- ISBN: 0207122768
- Preceded by: -
- Followed by: Once There Was a Swagman

Longtime Passing (1971) is a novel for children by Australian author H. F. Brinsmead. It won the Children's Book of the Year Award: Older Readers in 1972.

This novel was the first in the author's Longtime Books series.

== Plot outline ==
Edwin Truelance has built a house for his family in the Blue Mountains area of New South Wales, and called it "Longtime". In a series of anecdotes and episodes Teddy, the youngest child of the family, tells the story of how the house came to be built in a region of rainforest and bushland.

== Critical reception ==
In their report on the Children's Book of the Year Award for Older Readers the award's judges called the book "a warm-hearted novel for teenage girls." They went on to note that the author had based the book on her own life experience and that "it has the ring of authenticity and the author had invested her characters with a sharply defined reality."

Writing about Brinsmead's books for children, Walter McVitty noted that this "is a book written with economy, wisdom and humour, beautifully shaped into an artistic unity by being placed in the context of the original Daruk Aboriginal inhabitants and their legends."

== See also ==
- 1971 in Australian literature
