= The Runner (1962 film) =

- Written by: Alan Seymour
- Directed by: Brett Porter
- Country of origin: Australia
- Original language: English

Production
- Running time: 60 mins

Original release
- Release: 24 October 1962

The Runner is a 1962 Australian television play written by Alan Seymour which screened on ATN 7.

== Cast ==
- Lew Luton
- Reg Lye
- Brian Anderson as the ex-trainer

== Production ==
A copy of the script was sent to Herb Elliott to see if he would take offence. He wrote back saying he approved of the play.

In January 1961 it was announced the play had been filmed.

== Reception ==
It aired on Wednesday 24 October 1962 at 8 pm as part of a series of programs called By Special Request.

The critic for the Sydney Morning Herald wrote that the play "exemplified his [Seymour's] gift for finding subjects of universal potential combined with a central relevance to Australian occupations..."The Runner" promised well by taking as its central character a young Australian athlete rigorously trained to achieve fame far outdistancing his personal readiness for it."
