= The Ice Is Coming =

1977 novel by Patricia Wrightson

The Ice is Coming
- Author: Patricia Wrightson
- Language: English
- Series: The Book of Wirrun
- Genre: Children's fiction
- Publisher: Hutchinson
- Publication date: 1977
- Publication place: Australia
- Media type: Print
- Pages: 222 pp
- ISBN: 009129150X
- Preceded by: -
- Followed by: The Dark Bright Water

The Ice is Coming (1977) is a novel for children by Australian author Patricia Wrightson. It was originally published in Australia by Hutchinson.

This novel is the first in the author's The Book of Wirrun series for young readers. It was followed by The Dark Bright Water (1978) and Behind the Wind (1981).

It won the Children's Book of the Year Award: Older Readers in 1978.

== Plot outline ==
A city-bred Aboriginal boy, Wirrun, comes to the conclusion that the Ninya, central Australian ice-spirits, are sweeping across northern Australia. It appears their aim is to cover the whole of the Australian continent, defeating the oldest Nargun, and initiating another ice-age. Accompanied by Mimi, and aided by a talisman of the Aboriginal people, Wirrun sets off to defeat the Ninya.

== Critical reception ==
In The Canberra Times reviewer Malcolm Pettigrove commented that "In moving from the simpler to the more complex creatures, and in multiplying their number as she does in this book, Mrs Wrightson strengthens her mythology so as to make it virtually unassailable."

Writing about Wrightson's books for children, critic Walter McVitty noted that the book can "be read as an adventure story, in the high-fantasy tradition, about a hero's race to thwart the malevolent forces."

Ernest Hogan reviewed The Ice Is Coming for Different Worlds magazine and stated that "Patricia Wrightson has opened up a different world for us. Her books are a valuable introduction to the mythology of Aboriginal Australia."

== See also ==
- 1977 in Australian literature
