= All the Room =

Collected poems by David Rowbotham

- Author: David Rowbotham
- Language: English
- Genre: poetry collection
- Publisher: Jacaranda Press, Brisbane
- Publication date: 1964
- Publication place: Australia
- Media type: Print
- Pages: 56 pp
- Preceded by: Inland
- Followed by: Bungalow and Hurricane

All the Room (1964) is the third poetry collection by Australian poet David Rowbotham. It won the Grace Leven Prize for Poetry in 1964.

The collection consists of 49 poems, the majority of which were previously published in various Australian poetry and general magazines, with some published here for the first time.

== Contents ==
- "Shake Hands"
- "The Continent"
- "Forest Night"
- "Affinity"
- "The Tide"
- "There was Moonlight Shining"
- "The Winds"
- "Waterfall at Franz Josef Glacier, New Zealand"
- "The Mountain"
- "The Victory"
- "Roofs"
- "A Place"
- "Summer-Night Circus"
- "Love and Rain"
- "Straw"
- "A Twentieth Century Man [1962]"
- "So Dream"
- "Footfalls"
- "Call the Beauty"
- "The Flames Go Leaping Still..."
- "Landscape"
- "The Water"
- "The Tunnel"
- "Poet to Painter (for Jon Molvig)"
- "Memorial"
- "Sparrows"
- "The Soldier"
- "The Meeting"
- "Seven Lustres (on My Thirty-Fifth Birthday)"
- "The Boy"
- "Shadows"
- "Homeward"
- "Handle with Care"
- "Summer on the Farmlands"
- "Bay-Tree"
- "Your Eyes Were Measured ..."
- "Where Autumn Stood"
- "Three Horses"
- "Green Stones"
- "The Tree"
- "The Concertina"
- "The Palm"
- "The Stone"
- "Something Always"
- "Forever"
- "Christine"
- "Ben Bonney, Stoker"
- "Lunch-Time in Harvest (for Roger McDonald)"
- "The Country Man"

== Critical reception ==
In his review of the poetry collection in The Age Dennis Douglas noted "In Rowbotham's poetry technique counts far more than content", though he does go on to say the poet's "words can attain a startling freshness." He also concluded that "David Rowbotham seems to be seeking a new subject-matter and a new style."

Vivian Smith in The Bulletin found Rowbotham "striking out in new directions." He went on: "Rowbotham's strength has always been that of simple affection for and appreciation of country life and living. His tone is subdued, unassertive. One feels that he would rather not be heard than have to raise his voice."

== Awards ==
- 1964 - winner Grace Leven Prize for Poetry

== See also ==
- 1964 in Australian literature
- 1964 in poetry
