= The Fox Hole =

1967 children's novel by Ivan Southall

- Author: Ivan Southall
- Language: English
- Genre: Novel
- Publisher: Hicks Smith
- Publication date: 1967
- Publication place: Australia
- Media type: Print
- Pages: 125

The Fox Hole is a 1967 children's novel by Australian author Ivan Southall (1921–2008). It was first published in Great Britain by Methuen and in Australia by Hicks Smith, with subsequent editions in the UK and the US, and translations in a number of countries.

It is available to read online via The Internet Archive site.

== Plot summary ==
Ken is a ten-year-old boy who travels alone by train and bus to stay with his aunt, uncle, and cousins. The suspense begins to build as he faces the solo journey for the first time. After camping in a tent in the dark with his cousin, he becomes trapped in a blackberry thicket, then falls into a 'fox hole' that turns out to be an abandoned gold mine shaft that has a sinister story attached to it. When Ken makes a surprising discovery about the contents of the shaft, his uncle Bob and auntie Kath confront a conflict between their desire to rescue the injured Ken, and a greedy wish to capitalise on his discovery without anyone else finding out about it. This gives the story "a bit of a dark turn when it becomes clear that the uncle is having second thoughts about actually helping Ken."

== Publication history ==
After the novel's initial publication in Australia by Hicks Smith and the UK by Methuen in 1967 it was reprinted as follows:

- 1967 St. Martin's Press, USA
- 1972 Pan Books, UK

The novel was also translated into German in 1970, Italian in 1971, Swedish in 1971, Japanese in 1977, Spanish in 1987, Russian in 1988, and Korean in 2009

== Analysis ==
In his extensive published notes about Southall's work, retired lecturer in education John Gough stated that Southall was "a pioneer of realism in children's literature" who created "portraits of complicated children and teenagers". In The Fox Hole, the timid protagonist Ken must bravely survive a traumatic event.

== Reviews ==
A review in The New York Times noted of the work that "Conversation rings true, the writing is unabashedly evocative and adult, characters are as real as your own relations."

The judges for the 1967 Guardian Children's Fiction Prize "thought highly" of the book describing it as "short, tense, and with an Australian setting."

In The Observer the novel is praised as it shows the author's "gift for dramatic situation linked with moral tension [which] is here seen at its best."

== Awards ==
- 1968 Children's Book of the Year Award: Older Readers, Highly Commended
