= The Family Conspiracy =

Book by Joan Phipson

- First edition
- Author: Joan Phipson
- Language: English
- Genre: Children's fiction
- Publisher: Angus and Robertson (Aus); Constable (UK)
- Publication date: 1962
- Publication place: Australia
- Media type: Print
- Pages: 188pp
- Preceded by: The Boundary Riders
- Followed by: Threat to the Barkers

The Family Conspiracy (1962) is a novel for children by Australian author Joan Phipson; it was illustrated by Margaret Horder. It won the Children's Book of the Year Award: Older Readers in 1963.

== Story outline ==
The Barker family run a sheep farm in the Central West of New South Wales. When Mrs Barker is diagnosed with a medical condition that requires hospitalisation the family children create a "conspiracy" to raise the money required for her treatment.

== Critical reception ==
Writing in The Canberra Times a reviewer was impressed by the characterisation of the children: "These are no juvenile prodigies, outsmarting adults at every turn; they are very real people, combining childish strength and faults, and their actions are entirely credible. There is a great deal more that could be said in praise of this book; of its unassuming but faithful picture of the Australian country, and of the people who help give it character; of its patches of breathless adventure; and of the competent way in which characters and plot are welded together."

== Awards ==
- 1963 - winner Children's Book of the Year Award: Older Readers

== See also ==
- 1962 in Australian literature
