= Lillipilly Hill =

Book by Eleanor Spence

- First British edition
- Author: Eleanor Spence
- Cover artist: Susan Einzig
- Language: English
- Genre: Children's fiction
- Publisher: Oxford University Press
- Publication date: 1960
- Publication place: Australia
- Media type: Print
- Pages: 176 pp
- ISBN: 0192711660
- Preceded by: The Summer in Between
- Followed by: The Green Laurel

Lillipilly Hill (1960) is a novel for children by Australian author Eleanor Spence. It was commended for the Children's Book of the Year Award: Older Readers in 1961.

== Story outline ==
The novel follows the story of Harriet Wilmot and her family who go to live in a house in the NSW town of Barley Creek at the end of the nineteenth-century. They had previously lived in London and had inherited the house from a relative.

Harriot is very accepting of the new country though the rest of her family struggles with the heat and isolation. The book is a coming of age story, not just for Harriet but for her brother Aidan and for the rest of the family as well.

== Critical reception ==
Reviewing the Text Publishing release for Readings Alexa Dretzke was very happy to see the book re-issued and noted: "Lillipilly Hill is still a compelling read and the characters are well developed. Though the odd word may be a little dated, girls who have loved the Our Australian Girl series will find plenty to enjoy here."

== Notes ==
Text Publishing re-issued the novel in 2013 as a part of their "Text Classics" series, with an introduction by Ursula Dubosarsky.

== Awards ==
- 1961 – commended Children's Book of the Year Award: Older Readers

== See also ==
- 1960 in Australian literature
