= L. H. Evers =

Australian writer

- Born: Leonard Herbert Evers; 25 May 1926; Brisbane, Queensland
- Died: 18 February 1985 (aged 58)
- Occupations: novelist and writer for children
- Writing career
- Language: English
- Years active: 1954-1968
- Notable work: The Racketty Street Gang
- Notable awards: Children's Book of the Year Award: Older Readers

Leonard Herbert Evers (25 May 1926-18 February 1985) was an Australian novelist and writer for children who was born in Brisbane, Queensland.

After dropping out of high school at age fourteen, Len Evers joined the Australian Imperial Force during World War II and later served with the Occupation Force in Japan. Following the war he trained as a teacher and later attained an Arts Degree from Sydney University and a Diploma in Psychology. He left teaching in 1960 to become a psychologist in the NSW prison service.

He wrote four novels for adults and was awarded the Children's Book of the Year Award: Older Readers for his work The Racketty Street Gang in 1962.

Len Evers died in 1985.

== Bibliography ==
=== Novels ===
- Pattern of Conquest (1954)
- Long Under Darkness (1957)
- Make Way for Tomorrow (1960)
- Fall Among Thieves (1968)

=== Young Adult fiction ===
- The Racketty Street Gang (Hodder & Stoughton, 1961)
- Danny's Wonderful Uncle (Thomas Nelson, 1963) illustrated by George Adamson
