= Shadow of a Pale Horse (The General Motors Hour) =

- The General Motors Hour episode
- Episode no.: Season 1 Episode 5
- Directed by: David Cahill
- Teleplay by: Bruce Stewart
- Original air date: 17 September 1960
- Running time: 60 mins or 80 mins

Episode chronology
| ← Previous "You, Too, Can Have a Body" | Next → "The Concert" |

"Shadow of a Pale Horse" is a television play that was produced for Australian TV by Sydney station ATN-7, it was also shown in Melbourne on station GTV-9, as this was prior to the creation of the Seven Network and Nine Network (it is not known if it was also shown in Adelaide, Brisbane or Perth). "Shadow of a Pale Horse" aired on 17 September 1960 in Melbourne and Sydney.

It was part of The General Motors Hour, a loosely scheduled occasional series which presented various types of one-off local productions.

== Cast ==
- Brian James as Kirk
- Leonard Teale as Jack Rigger
- Kurt Ludescher as Condringer
- Ben Gabriel
- Thelma Scott
- Lynne Murphy as Rigger's wife
- John Gray
- Henry Gilbert
- Stuart Finch
- Peter McCredie

== Production ==
The production was shot in Sydney at ATN's studios. Fred "Cul" Cullen, art director, researched details at Sydney libraries.

Kurt Ledescher was a European actor who had only just arrived in Australia. The production aired a few weeks after the American version had been made.

Brian Wright, who appeared in the show, had written the radio serial Hop Harrigan which had starred Bruce Stewart a number of years earlier. It was an early TV role for Leonard Teale.

Gwen Plumb wrote in her memoirs that a brown horse was used and the crew covered it in Johnson's Baby Powder to make it look ghostly. "It really looked ghostly," she wrote. But the powder made the horse sneeze and shake himself "and a white cloud enshrouded the studio." They tried it two much times, then gave up. Plumb says someone then had the idea of whitewashing the horse. "And they did! That poor beast."

In one six minute scene only one camera was used.

== Reception ==
The Sydney Morning Herald said "in almost every respect" the show "was a success." The Age called it "disappointing."

The show won Best Australian Drama at the 1961 Logie Awards.

It was repeated in Melbourne on 21 October 1961 and in Sydney on 12 October 1960 and 28 October 1961.

The play was performed on Australian radio in 1965.

According to Filmink magazine, the production is "not flawless – James and Teale both have these terrible beards, which should not have been allowed on air, and the accents distract. But generally, the acting is strong (particularly James, John Gray and Ben Gabriel as townsfolk) and the story is extremely compelling. It doesn’t stuff around or sell out."
