= Hesba Fay Brinsmead =

Australian writer

H. F. Brinsmead
- Born: Hesba Fay Hungerford; 15 March 1922; Berambing, New South Wales
- Died: 24 November 2003 (aged 81); Murwillumbah, New South Wales
- Writing career
- Language: English
- Years active: 1961-1994
- Notable work: Pastures of the Blue Crane
- Notable awards: Children's Book of the Year Award: Older Readers 1965

Hesba Fay Brinsmead (Hesba Fay Hungerford; 15 March 1922 in Berambing, New South Wales – 24 November 2003 in Murwillumbah) was an Australian author of children's books and an environmentalist.

== Biography ==
=== Upbringing ===
Brinsmead's parents, Edward Kenelm Guy Hungerford and May Lambert, were missionaries for the Seventh-day Adventist Church who left Sydney for Java (Indonesia) 1909 to 1912. On their return her father and his brothers built homes in the isolated area of the Blue Mountains where Brinsmead was born. Ken and May took their three small children, one of whom was seriously ill, with them. They farmed in this beautiful place while the children grew up. Brinsmead was the youngest and, for several years, was the only child at home as her siblings were at school in town.

=== The writer ===
Brinsmead was determined to be a writer from an early age but had very little formal education due to her home's remote location. Her mother gave her much of her early education at home around their kitchen table. After completing some primary schooling by correspondence she attended a small church high school at Wahroonga, Sydney. Eventually she left home in her mid-teens and became a teacher. She taught in various places around Australia, at a one-teacher school, as a governess in the far west of NSW and in the Derwent Valley of Tasmania. She undertook a correspondence course in journalism while in her thirties. She had married Reg Brinsmead when 20 years of age and had two sons. Her husband owned and managed a pest control business active in three states. Finding time to write or study was a struggle for Brinsmead as she was always kept busy with clerical tasks and arranging employees' food and accommodation needs. She managed to escape in various ways to find a place to write undisturbed; to a caravan in the back yard or to coffee shops.

While living in Melbourne, the ANZ bank near her home in the suburb of Nunawading allowed her to use a spare room on their premises. She lived for varying lengths of time in North Queensland, Melbourne, Tasmania, the West Australian outback, and in northern New South Wales. These places are all featured strongly in her novels.

=== Influences and inspiration ===
Her novels, taken from her experiences and travels around Australia, were written for children and young adults; however, they expressed many themes that have gained more prominence in today's world – such as the fragility and beauty of the environment and indigenous areas and the need for their conservation, the effect of ecological damage, the plight of refugees and societies disaffected and the human cost of resource development. As examples, Echo in the Wilderness, set on Lake Pedder on the eve of its destruction, chronicles the submergence and obliteration of the lake. Her 1983 book, I Will Not Say the Day Is Done (her only non-fiction/adult book) brought to life the struggle to save Lake Pedder. She was passionately consumed by the need to do something about environmental vandalism in Tasmania. Her book Isle of the Sea Horse, released in 1969, grew out of her concern about the ecological devastation to the Great Barrier Reef and, among other concerns, the plight of refugees. Her Longtime trilogy was set in, and inspired by her upbringing in, the Blue Mountains.

=== Recognition and later life ===
She was friends with fellow well known children's writers Nance Donkin and Lu Rees and, later, provided advice and support to younger writer Nette Hilton, after she moved to Northern New South Wales in 1976. Brinsmead was twice the winner of the Children's Book Council of Australia's Book of the Year Award (for Pastures of the Blue Crane in 1965 and Longtime Passing in 1972), and winner of the Dame Mary Gilmore Medallion in 1965. Pastures of the Blue Crane was later made into a successful mini-series by ABC TV. Her fame from writing books allowed her to forge a separate but related career as a public speaker, speaking at conferences, seminars, meetings, school and public library events. Many of her over twenty books reached an international readership and were translated into Japanese, Italian, Czech, and German as well as being published in British, American and Australian editions.

In later life she retired to Terranora in northern NSW but even in her later years was an outspoken opponent of developers taking over the land. She stopped writing in the 1990s due to ill health. She had suffered from osteoporosis all her life.

== Bibliography ==
- Pastures of the Blue Crane – Brinsmead, Hesba Fay; illustrated by Annette Macarthur-Onslow – London: Oxford University Press, 1964 – ISBN 0-7022-3462-1
- Season of the Briar – H. F. (Hesba Fay) Brinsmead – Ill:William Papas Oxford University Press 1965 – ISBN 0-19-271259-4
- Beat of the City – H.F. Brinsmead; illustrated by William Papas. London : Oxford University Press, 1966 – ISBN 0-19-271261-6
- A Sapphire for September – Brinsmead, Hesba Fay – Oxford University Press London 1967 – ISBN 0-333-47803-7
- Isle of the Sea Horse – Brinsmead, H.F. (Hesba). Illusts. by Peter Farmer Oxford University Press London 1969 – ISBN 0-19-271307-8
- Who Calls From Afar? – H.F. Brinsmead; illustrated by Ian Ribbons. London : Oxford University Press, 1971 – ISBN 0-19-271325-6
- Longtime Passing – Brinsmead, Hesba Fay. Sydney: Angus & Robertson, 1972 – ISBN 0-14-030597-1
- Echo in the Wilderness – Brinsmead, Hesba Fay Graham Humphreys Oxford University Press Oxford 1972 – ISBN 0-19-271344-2
- The Ballad of Benny Perhaps – Brinsmead, Hesba Fay Brinsmead, Hesba Fay Cassell & Co Ltd North Melbourne 1977 – SBN 072690449X
- The Wind Harp – Hesba Brinsmead: Ill: Peter Dickie – Pub : Cassell Australia, Stanmore NSW 1977 – ISBN 0-04-442159-1
- The Honey Forest – Brinsmead, Hesba; illustrated by Louise Hogan – Sydney : Hodder and Stoughton, 1979 – ISBN 0-340-23048-7
- Once There Was a Swagman – Brinsmead, Hesba Fay. Ringwood, Vic : Puffin Books, 1981, c. 1979 – ISBN 0-19-550549-2
- Time for Tarquinia – Brinsmead, Hesba Fay.; illustrated by Bruce Riddell. Sydney : Hodder & Stoughton, 1981 – ISBN 0-340-26617-1
- Longtime Dreaming – Hesba Brinsmead; Illustrations – Ken Hungerford London; Sydney Angus & Robertson, 1982 – ISBN 0-207-14435-4
- Christmas at Longtime – Brinsmead, Hesba Fay; illustrated by John Caldwell. . London & Sydney: Angus & Robertson, 1983 – ISBN 0-207-14543-1
- I Will Not Say the Day Is Done – Hesba Brinsmead- with Ken Hungerford. Chippendale, N.S.W. : Alternative Publishing Cooperative, 1983.(Non-fiction) – ISBN 0-909188-66-1
- Someplace Beautiful – Hesba Brinsmead; illustrated by Betina Ogden. Sydney : Hodder and Stoughton, 1986 – ISBN 0-340-35776-2
- The Sandforest – H. F. (Hesba Fay) Brinsmead 1922– Puffin Paperback 1987 – ISBN 0-207-15049-4
- When You Come to the Ferry – Hesba Brinsmead; illustrated by Dee Huxley. Sydney : Hodder and Stoughton, 1988 – ISBN 0-340-40629-1
- Bianca and Roja – Brinsmead, Hesba Fay; illustrations by Andrew McLean. Allen & Unwin Pty., Limited North Sydney 1990
- The Silver Train to Midnight and other Stories – Brinsmead, Hesba Fay.; illustrated by Sandra Laroche. Sydney : Margaret Hamilton Books, 1993

== See also ==
- Robert Brinsmead, her brother-in-law
- Authors & Illustrators of Australian Children's Books – Walter McVitty – Pub: Hodder & Stoughton, Sydney 1989 – ISBN 0-340-38742-4
- Who's Who of Australian Children's Writers – Pub: D W Thorpe, Melbourne 1992 – ISBN 0-909532-99-0
- Fourth Book of Authors & Illustrators – Ed. by Doris Monteville & Elizabeth D. Crawford – Pub: The H W Wilson Company, New York 1971 – ISBN 0-8242-0568-5
- Days Never Done: The Life and Work of Hesba Fay Brinsmead – Michael Pollak and Margaret MacNabb – Pub : Unity Press, 2002 – ISBN 0-9589759-3-0
- Monash Biographical Dictionary of 20th Century Australians – Ed: John Arnold & Deidre Morris – Pub: Reed Reference Publishing 1994 – ISBN 1-875589-19-8
