= The First Walkabout =

Book by Norman Tindale and Harold Arthur Lindsay

- Author: Norman B. Tindale & Harold Arthur Lindsay
- Language: English
- Genre: Children's fiction
- Publisher: Longmans Green
- Publication date: 1954
- Publication place: Australia
- Media type: Print
- Pages: 129pp

The First Walkabout is an Australian children's novel first published in 1954. It tells the story of the very earliest occupation of the continent of Australia by the Negrito people, a group that arrived in Australia before the ancestors of the present-day Aboriginal peoples.

== Critical reception ==
While covering a selection of possible Christmas book gifts for children in The Brisbane Telegraph in 1954, a reviewer noted: "Mr. Tindale is ethnologist at the South Australian museum, and Mr. Lindsay is the well-known authority on the Australian bushland. They have collaborated to produce an authentic and entertaining story of Australia some ten or twelve thousand years ago."

== See also ==
- 1954 in Australian literature
