= Ivan Southall =

Australian writer (1921–2008)

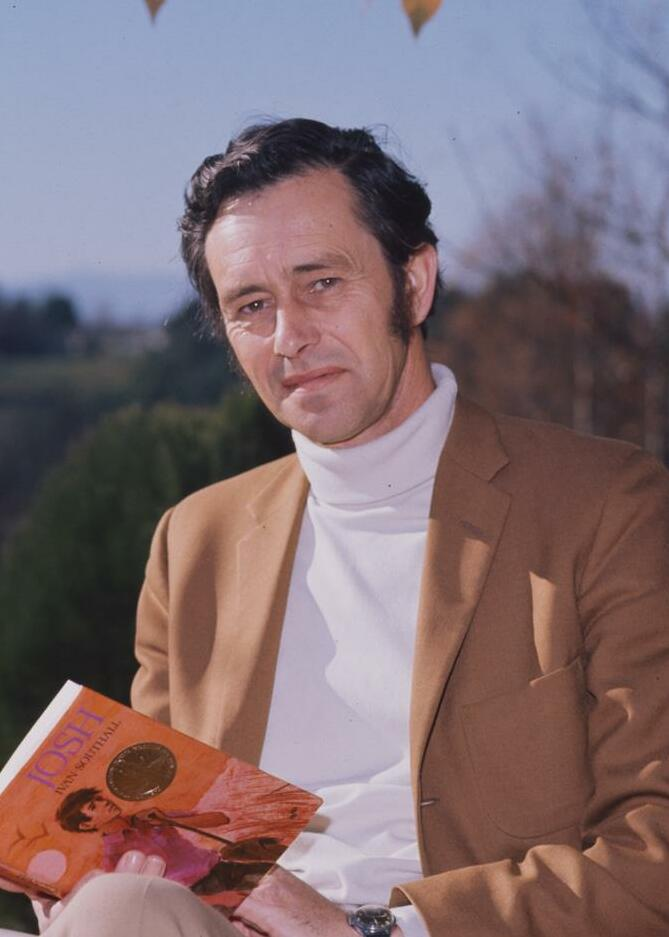
- Southall in 1972
- Born: Ivan Francis Southall; 8 June 1921; Canterbury, Victoria
- Died: 15 November 2008 (aged 87); Wantirna, Victoria
- Writing career
- Language: English
- Years active: 1942-2000
- Notable works: Ash Road, To the Wild Sky, Bread and Honey, Fly West
- Notable awards: Children's Book of the Year Award: Older Readers 1966, 1968, 1971, 1976; Carnegie Medal 1971

Ivan Francis Southall AM, DFC (8 June 1921 – 15 November 2008) was an Australian writer best known for young adult fiction. He wrote more than 30 children's books, six books for adults, and at least ten works of history, biography or other non-fiction.

== Personal life ==
Ivan Southall was born in Melbourne, Victoria. His father died when Ivan was 14, and he and his brother Gordon were raised by their mother. He went to Mont Albert Central School (where he wrote the first of his Simon Black stories) and later Box Hill Grammar, but was forced to leave school early, and became an apprentice process engraver. He joined the Royal Australian Air Force on 19 Jun 1942 serving with 461 Squadron RAAF (raised under an Article XV of the Empire Air Training Scheme) . He was decorated with the Distinguished Flying Cross for his role in sinking a German U-boat, U-385, in the Bay of Biscay on 11 August 1944 (in concert with the destroyer HMS Swift). He returned to Australia with his English bride, Joy Blackburn. Their youngest daughter was born with Down syndrome. His was discharged on 19 Nov 1946.

He tried his hand at farming at Monbulk, but the attempt foundered, so he became a full-time writer.

He met his first wife, Joy Blackburn, during the Second World War and they had four children, Andrew, Roberta, Elizabeth and Melissa. He remarried, to Susan Stanton, whom he met in 1974 on his United States visit to deliver the May Hill Arbuthnot Lecture at the University of Washington. Southall died of cancer on 15 November 2008 aged 87.

His daughter Elizabeth had three daughters, the eldest of whom was murdered in 1999. Elizabeth wrote a book about the case in 2002 titled Perfect Victim. The story was made into a film called In Her Skin in 2009.

== Writer ==
Ivan Southall began his career as a writer primarily writing historical accounts for adults. Notably, he wrote the biography of Keith Truscott, an Australian fighter ace who served in England in the last stages of the Battle of Britain and the aftermath, and later in Darwin and at Milne Bay.

Southall also wrote the official history of his Royal Australian Air Force squadron, 461 Squadron, based at Pembroke Dock, a town in South West Wales, when he was pilot of Short Sunderland flying boats. Later he published a version of this history as They Shall Not Pass Unseen and much later returned to his experiences of combat in Sunderlands in books for younger readers.

Southall also wrote Softly Tread the Brave, describing the courage of Royal Australian Volunteer Naval Reserve bomb disposal officers, Hugh Syme (GC, GM and Bar) and John Mould (GC, GM), who served in England disarming parachute mines. Southall later published a version of this story for younger readers under the title Seventeen Seconds — the time available to run in case the fuse of the mine was accidentally triggered while trying to disarm it.

From 1950 to 1962, Southall also wrote, for younger readers, adventure stories about a fictional brave pilot, 'Simon Black' — an Australian counterpart to W.E. Johns' hero 'Biggles'. Several of these ventured into science-fiction, with space flight, aliens and lost humanoid races.

After 1960, Southall's career pivoted into the everyday world of children and teenage characters. Southall dealt in his books both with survival in the face of dramatic events such as fire and flood and with personal and psychological challenges. He was one of the first to write specifically for young adults.

Southall's best known children's novels include Hills End, Ash Road, Let the Balloon Go and Josh (1962 to 1971). The non-fiction Fly West recounts his experiences in Short Sunderland flying boats during the Second World War. He is the only Australian winner of the annual Carnegie Medal for British children's books, the 1971 award to Josh. (Note: For about sixty years, the Library Association (now CILIP) defined British children's books by publication of the first edition in Britain. Around the turn of the century it opened the Carnegie and Greenaway Medals to books published in Britain within three months of the first English-language edition, which covers at least the co-publication that is now common.)

A retrospective exhibition Southall A–Z: Ash Road to Ziggurat was held in the State Library of Victoria in 1998 and is available online. It includes an interview conducted in 1997, a biography, bibliography and exhibition of book cover designs with information about the books.

== Honours ==
Ivan Southall won the 1971 Carnegie Medal from the Library Association, recognising Josh as the year's best children's book by a British subject. He was the first Medalist from outside the United Kingdom and remains the only one from Australia.

Ash Road, To the Wild Sky, Bread and Honey and the nonfiction Fly West were all named CBCA Australian Children's Book of the Year (1966 to 1976).

Southall was appointed a Member of the Order of Australia (AM) in 1981.

In 2003 he was awarded the Dromkeen Medal by the Oldmeadow Foundation for his lifetime contribution to children's literature in Australia.

Earlier that year, the Phoenix Award from the Children's Literature Association had recognised The Long Night Watch (Methuen Children's Books, 1983) as the best English-language children's book that did not get a major award when it was originally published twenty years earlier. It is named for the mythical bird phoenix, which is reborn from its ashes, to suggest the book's rise from obscurity.

The Sly Old Wardrobe, written by Southall and illustrated by Ted Greenwood, was named Children's Picture Book of the Year in 1969.

== Works ==
=== Nonfiction ===
- The Weaver from Meltham (Melbourne: Whitcombe & Tombs, 1950) — about South Geelong carpet manufacturer Godfrey Hirst
- The Story of The Hermitage: the first fifty years of the Geelong Church of England Girls' Grammar School (Melbourne: F. W. Cheshire, 1956)
- They Shall Not Pass Unseen (Sydney: Angus and Robertson, 1956)
- A Tale of Box Hill: day of the forest (Box Hill: Box Hill City Council, 1957)
- Bluey Truscott (Angus and Robertson, 1958)
- Softly Tread the Brave (1960) about Australian mine clearance officers John Mould and Hugh Syme (GC)
- Seventeen Seconds (1960) an abridged version of Softly Tread the Brave
- Journey into Mystery (1961)
- Parson on the Track (1961)
- Indonesia Face to Face (1964)
- Lawrence Hargrave (1964), in the Six Great Australians series
- Rockets in the Desert: The Story of Woomera (1965)
- The Challenge: Is the Church Obsolete? (1966)
- Fly West (1974)
- A Journey of Discovery: on writing for children (1975)

=== Fiction ===
- Simon Black series (RAAF adventure stories)
  - Meet Simon Black (1950)
  - Simon Black in Peril (1951)
  - Simon Black in Space (1952)
  - Simon Black in Coastal Command (1953)
  - Simon Black in China (1954)
  - Simon Black and the Spacemen (1955)
  - Simon Black in the Antarctic (1956)
  - Simon Black Takes Over (1959)
  - Simon Black at Sea (1961)

After Simon Black, Southall changed emphasis "from the actual adventure ... to the depiction of the way children respond, interact and grow".

- Hills End (1962)
- Ash Road (1965)
- The Fox Hole (1967)
- To the Wild Sky (1967)
- Sly Old Wardrobe (1968), pictures by Ted Greenwood
- Let the Balloon Go (1968)
- Finn's Folly (1969)
- Chinaman's Reef is Ours (1970)
- Bread and Honey (1970); US title, Walk a Mile and Get Nowhere
- Josh (1971)
- Benson Boy (1972)
- Head in the Clouds (1972)
- Over the Top (1972)
- Matt and Jo
- What About Tomorrow (1977)
- King of the Sticks (1979)
- The Golden Goose (1981) — sequel to King of the Sticks
- The Long Night Watch (1983)
- A City Out of Sight (1984)
- Rachel (1986)
- Blackbird (1988)
- The Mysterious World of Marcus Leadbeater (1990)
- Ziggurat (1997)
