= Joan Phipson =

Australian children's writer

- Born: Joan Margaret Phipson; 16 November 1912; Warrawee, New South Wales
- Died: 2 April 2003 (aged 90)
- Education: Frensham School
- Occupation: Writer
- Spouse: Colin Fitzhardinge
- Children: Guy and Anna
- Writing career
- Language: English
- Genre: Children's literature
- Notable awards: CBCA Book of the Year Award for Good Luck to the Rider and The Family Conspiracy; International Board on Books for Young People (IBBY) Honour Diploma for The Watcher in the Garden; American Library Association Notable Books list for children for Hit and Run; Became a member of the Order of Australia in 1994

Joan Margaret Phipson AM (16 November 1912 – 2 April 2003) was an Australian children's writer.

She lived on a farm in the Central Tablelands of New South Wales and many of her books evoke the stress and satisfaction of living in the Australian countryside, floods, bushfires, drought and all. Two of her novels, Good Luck to the Rider and The Family Conspiracy, won the Australian Children's Book of the Year Award.

== Biography ==
Joan Phipson was born in Warrawee, New South Wales, on 16 November 1912, to English parents. She spent much of her childhood traveling between Australia, England and India. She attended the Frensham School, where she later worked as a librarian and printer, setting up Frensham Press. She studied journalism and worked for Reuters in London before the war. From 1941 to 1944 she served as a telegraphist in the Women's Auxiliary Australian Air Force.

She married Colin Fitzhardinge in 1944 and they settled in the NSW countryside. Her first children's book, about a girl on an Australian ranch who adopts an orphaned colt, was published in 1953, and she continued to write into the 1990s. She died on 2 April 2003, aged 90, survived by her children, Guy and Anna.

== Awards ==
Good Luck to the Rider was named Australian Children's Book of the Year in 1953. The Family Conspiracy won the award in 1963, and also won the New York Herald Tribune Children's Spring Book Festival Award in 1964. The Watcher in the Garden received an International Board on Books for Young People (IBBY) Honour Diploma. Hit and Run was chosen as a White Ravens Selection of the International Youth Library in Munich and was also chosen for the American Library Association Notable Books list for children and for the ALA Best Books list for young adults. In 1987 Joan Phipson was awarded the Dromkeen Medal for advancing children's literature in Australia, and in 1994 became a member of the Order of Australia.

== Literary significance ==
At a time when Australian literature was dominated by English and American books, Joan Phipson provided an authentic Australian voice. Her early books concerned family life in the country, animals, riding and sailing. Her first book with an urban setting was Peter and Butch. Later, in the 1970s and '80s, she handled a variety of challenging subjects such as the brutal racket in rare bird smuggling (Fly into Danger), urban breakdown (Keep Calm), nuclear warfare (Dinko) and teenage alienation (The Watcher in the Garden).

Maurice Saxby, the children's literature expert, wrote: "More than any other writers, Eleanor Spence and Joan Phipson have perhaps helped guide the direction of Australian children's literature in the past 30 years. They have both expressed in their novels of family life not only social changes but the concerns and preoccupations of a growingly complex Australian society."

Most of her books were published in the UK and the US as well as Australia, and her work was translated into French, German, Swedish and Hungarian.

== Bibliography ==
- Good Luck to the Rider (1953)
- Six and Silver (1954)
- It Happened One Summer (1957)
- The Boundary Riders (1962)
- The Family Conspiracy (1962)
- Threat to the Barkers (1963)
- Birkin (1965)
- A Lamb in the Family (1966)
- The Crew of the Merlin (1966)
- Cross Currents (1967)
- Peter and Butch (1969)
- The Haunted Night (1970)
- Bass and Billy Martin (1972)
- The Way Home (1973)
- Polly's Tiger (1973)
- Helping Horse (1974) (US title: Horse with Eight Hands)
- The Cats (1976)
- Hide Till Daytime (1976)
- Fly into Danger (1977) (Australian title, published 1979: The Bird Smugglers)
- Keep Calm (1978) (US title: When the City Stopped)
- No Escape (1979) (US title: Fly Free)
- Mr Pringle and the Prince (1979)
- A Tide Flowing (1981)
- The Watcher in the Garden (1982)
- The Grannie Season (1985)
- Dinko (1985)
- Hit and Run (1985)
- Beryl the Rainmaker (1987)
- Bianca (1988)

=== Non-fiction ===
- Bennelong (Australians in History series) (1975)
- Contributed to: The Early Dreaming: Australian Children's Authors on Childhood (1980) – authors recall their own childhood
