= Norman Tindale =

Australian anthropologist & entomologist (1900–1993)

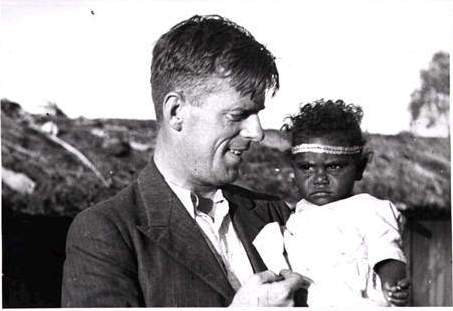
- Tindale holding a child from Mona Mona Aboriginal Mission in Queensland, 1938
- Born: Norman Barnett Tindale; 12 October 1900; Perth, Western Australia, Australia
- Died: 19 November 1993 (aged 93); Palo Alto, California, U.S.
- Education: University of Adelaide
- Awards: Verco Medal; John Lewis Medal; AO

Norman Barnett Tindale AO (12 October 1900 – 19 November 1993) was an Australian anthropologist, archaeologist, entomologist and ethnologist. He is best remembered for his work mapping the various tribal groupings of Aboriginal Australians at the time of European settlement, shown in his map published in 1940. This map provided the basis of a map published by David Horton in 1996 and widely used in its online form today. Tindale's major work was Aboriginal Tribes of Australia: Their terrain, Environmental Controls, Distribution, Limits and Proper Names (1974).

== Life ==
Tindale was born on 12 October 1900 in Perth, Western Australia. His family moved to Tokyo and lived there from 1907 to 1915, where his father worked as an accountant at the Salvation Army mission in Japan. Norman attended the American School in Japan, where his closest friend was Gordon Bowles, a Quaker who, like him, later became an anthropologist.

The family returned to Perth in August 1917, and soon after moved to Adelaide, South Australia, where Tindale took up a position as a library cadet at the Adelaide Public Library, together with another cadet, the future physicist, Mark Oliphant. In 1919, he began work as an entomologist at the South Australian Museum. From his early years, he had acquired the habit of taking notes on everything he observed, and cross-indexing them before going to sleep, a practice which he continued throughout his life, and which lay at the basis of the vast archive of notes he left to posterity: he was observed writing by lamplight far into the night long after others had gone to bed, during an expedition to the Pinacate.

Shortly after this, Tindale lost the sight in one eye in an acetylene gas explosion which occurred while assisting his father with photographic processing. In January 1919, he secured a position at the South Australian Museum as Entomologist's Assistant to the formidable Arthur Mills Lea. He had already published thirty-one papers on entomological, ornithological and anthropological subjects before receiving his Bachelor of Science degree at the University of Adelaide in March 1933.

=== Early ethnological expeditions, 1921–1939 ===
Tindale's first ethnographic expedition took place over 1921–1922. His principal aim was to gather entomological specimens for the South Australian Museum, the ethnographic aspect being almost an accidental sideline that developed, as his curiosity was stimulated, into close observation of the indigenous people he encountered from the Cobourg Peninsula to the Gulf of Carpentaria.

Tindale's family background had qualified him to be taken on by the Church Missionary Society of Australia and Tasmania which was interested in proselytizing in the north. He spent half a year, accompanying the missionary Hubert E. Warren to sound out the area for an appropriate site for an Anglican mission, which as the Emerald River Mission, was subsequently established on west coast of Groote Eylandt. He followed this up with a further 9 months nearby on the mainland around the Roper River. Tindale wrote up his observations for the South Australian Museum in two continuous reports, which constitute the first detailed account of the Warnindhilyagwa people on that island.

In 1938–39, Tindale teamed up with Joseph Birdsell, an anthropological graduate student, who was under Earnest Hooton of Harvard University, after meeting the pair on a 1936 visit to the US. They were to undertake an extensive anthropological survey of Aboriginal reserves and missions across Australia, and the relationship forged between the two developed into a half century of collaboration. Tindale would study the genealogies, while Birdsell undertook the measuring, and with government support the pair travelled across south-east Australia, parts of Queensland, Western Australia, and Tasmania. In May 1938, the two men and their wives visited Cummeragunja Aboriginal reserve in New South Wales. A later study looking at their 1939 expedition to the Cape Barren Island Aboriginal reserve said that this contributed to their decision to advocate assimilation ("absorption") as a solution to "the half-caste problem".

Tindale's vast collection, held at the South Australian Museum, is made up of genealogical information about Aboriginal communities throughout Australia, journals, papers, sound and film recordings, drawings, maps, photographs, vocabularies and personal correspondence. Each State Library in Australia holds copies of Tindale material pertaining to their respective state; for example, the State Library of New South Wales has copies of genealogical charts and photographs from the communities of Boggabilla, Brewarrina, Cummeragunja, Kempsey, Menindee, Pilliga, Walgett, Wallaga Lake and Woodenbong. while the State Library of Queensland has genealogical sheets for the communities of Bentinck Island, Cherbourg, Doomadgee, Mona Mona Aboriginal Mission, Mornington Island, Palm Island, Woodenbong, Woorabinda and Yarrabah. Tindale's genealogical collection is a key research tool for Australian Aboriginal people to discover evidence of their family lineage and connection with community.

=== Wartime service ===
On the outbreak of World War 2, Tindale tried to enlist, but was rejected because of his poor eyesight. When Japan precipitated war with the United States however, Tindale's knowledge of Japanese, rare in Australia at the time, made him an asset for military intelligence. In 1942 Tindale joined the Royal Australian Air Force and, assigned the rank of wing commander, he was transferred to The Pentagon, where he worked with the Strategic Bombing Survey as an analyst for estimating the impact of bombing on the military and civilian population of Japan.

In 1942 an Air Technical Intelligence Unit was established under Captain Frank T. McCoy at Hangar 7, Eagle Farm airfield just outside Brisbane, and on Tindale's initiative it was tasked with examining parts recovered from the wreckage of Japanese airplanes that had been shot down, working out whatever intelligence could be gathered from the manufacturing markings, and reassembling them where possible. Jones states that Tindale's unit's meticulous analysis of the metallurgical debris and serial numbers enabled them to arrive at the companies responsible for producing the components, deduce production figures and infer what crucial alloys the Japan military was beginning to suffer shortfalls in.

Tindale also played a major intelligence role in putting a halt to Japan's balloon bombing assault (Note: This device was called a "balloon bomb" (fūsen bakudan:風船爆弾) or "dirigible bomb" (kikyũ bakudan: (気球爆弾).) on the western coast of the United States. His team's forensic analysis of the debris enabled the U.S. Air Force to identify and bomb the production facilities in Japan. Jones adds two other key contributions by Tindale to the war effort:

He was instrumental in cracking the Japanese aircraft production code system, which gave the Allies reliable information as to Japanese air power. More importantly, he and his unit deciphered the Japanese master naval code.

=== Later years ===
On retirement after 49 years service with the South Australian Museum, Tindale took up a teaching position at the University of Colorado and remained in the United States until his death, aged 93, in Palo Alto, California on 19 November 1993.

== Work ==
=== Ethnology ===
Tindale is best remembered for his work mapping the various tribal groupings of Aboriginal Australians at the time of European settlement, which he based on his fieldwork and other sources, leading to the publication of his Map showing the distribution of the Aboriginal tribes of Australia in 1940. This interest began with a research trip to Groote Eylandt where Tindale's helper and interpreter, a Ngandi man, impressed him with the importance of knowing with precision tribal boundaries. This led Tindale to question the official orthodoxy of the time, which was that Aboriginal people were purely nomadic and had no connection to any specific region. While Tindale's methodology and his notion of the "dialectal tribe" have been superseded, this basic premise has been proved correct.

His salvage ethnography also involved collecting by trade objects for his museum. He was meticulous in making notes on the provenance of each object purchased. Philip Jones writes:

one of Tindale's key tasks was to record the names and sociological details of each of the Aboriginal people participating in the fortnight-long intensive survey. This had a crucial outcome in that each object, drawing, photograph, sound recording or even film record subsequently collected by Tindale during these expeditions could be keyed, not only to place and tribal group, but to their individual makers or owners.'

At the same time, these collections were often made using mere lollies or tobacco as barter goods for precious items, and at times exploited the dire conditions of undernourishment suffered by Aboriginal people. After one successful expedition at Flinders Island he wrote: "The Flinders Island people are hungry and in exchange for flour etc have been scouring the camp for specimens. We have pretty well cleaned them up, & nothing of much interest remains".

In historical context, Tindale's firm insistence on the unit of a tribe, with its set territory and fixed boundaries, flew in the face of A. R. Radcliffe-Brown's dismissal of the idea of a higher integrating reality like the tribe, as opposed to the assemblies of hordes. Tribes did not hold land, each of their respective "hordes" did, and clan-attachment of land was Radcliffe-Brown's basic sociological unit for Australian groups. Neither notion has stood the test of time. In particular Tindale's notion of a fixed tribal territory proved inadequate at least as regards the nomadic realities of the Western Desert cultural bloc, as Ronald Berndt and Catherine Berndt implicitly argued as early as 1942, (Note: "A tribal area is ever varying, although a group of people do through the passing of many years become associated with a particular stretch of country. For example, there is the tendency expressed in cult totemism for a man to desire his son to be born near his own totemic birthplace, that is, the water or stretch of country containing a sacred site associated with a particular totemic ancestral being. Even when the family group is at a great distance from their ancestral country, if a birth be expected, they will travel back. By being born near his father's water-hole (and if his father has married a woman born in a particular country through which the ancestral being associated with him has passed), the child, after initiation, becomes a full member of his father's cult lodge. His fellow tribesmen constitute those who are born along the ancestral route, or adjacent ones which cross or run near the main one.") and in more detail almost two decades later by Ronald Berndt.

His major work was published in 1974, Aboriginal Tribes of Australia: Their terrain, Environmental Controls, Distribution, Limits and Proper Names, which has found its place as a major work of reference even into the 21st century. He dedicated the book to German Pallottine missionary, linguist, and anthropologist Ernest Ailred Worms, with these words "To the memory of Father Ernest A. Worms whose active encouragement, beginning in the year 1952, led to the preparation of this work in its present form".

=== Film making ===
The Adelaide Board for Anthropological Research began a programme for filming Aboriginal life in 1926, and was the first to systematically do so. Over an 11-year period they produced over 10 hours of footage concerning many aspects of Aboriginal life, from material culture to hunting and gathering practices, cooking, love-making, and even ceremonies of circumcision observed during their field expeditions. Tindale produced the film while the camera-work was undertaken by E. O. Stocker.

=== Entomology ===
Tindale made a particular study of the primitive Hepialidae or ghost moth family of the order Lepidoptera. In the 1920s he began to revise understanding of the Australian Mantidae (Archimantis mantids) and mole crickets. A point of departure was a meticulous analysis of the male genitalia of each species, as a guide to more precise classification, and, starting in 1932, over three decades he wrote several papers reordering the Australian ghost moths.

== Recognition and honours ==
Tindale was awarded the Verco Medal of the Royal Society of South Australia during 1956, the Australian Natural History Medallion during 1968 and the John Lewis Medal of the Royal Geographical Society of Australasia during 1980. In 1967, aged 66, he received an honorary doctorate from the University of Colorado. He was eventually honoured with a doctorate by the Australian National University in 1980.

During 1993 Tindale received unofficial confirmation of his appointment as an Officer of the Order of Australia (AO); this was presented posthumously, to his widow Muriel. Also in 1993, the South Australian Museum board named a public gallery in his honour.

== Evaluations ==
=== Mapping of tribes ===
The editor of Tindale's paper on Groote Eylandt in 1925, Edgar Waite, changed his drawn boundaries as dotted lines, obtrusively insisting that Aboriginal people were nomadic, and not place-bound. When Tindale finally managed to print, unaltered, his own map, he represented the Aboriginal peoples as filling every nook and cranny of what became colonial Australia, avowing their former presence, much to the unease of many cartographers, everywhere. In doing so he placed a disappearing people back "on the map", much to the later discontent of mining corporations, which fund research that would revise Tindale's approach and restrict Aboriginal territoriality.

David Horton later used Tindale's map as a basis for the maps included in his Encyclopaedia of Aboriginal Australia: Aboriginal and Torres Strait Islander History, Society and Culture (1994) and the separate map published in 1996.

=== Criticisms ===
The prevailing criticism of Tindale's influential overview of Australian tribes stresses the dangers in his guiding premise that there is an overlap between the language spoken by a group, and its tribal domains. In short, Tindale thought that speakers of the same language constituted a unified territorial group identity.

It has been argued that Tindale's early familiarity with Japanese affected his hearing and transliteration of words in a number of Aboriginal languages, such as Ngarrindjeri. Japanese is written syllabically reflecting its phonetic consonant+vowel structure, and in writing down words like tloperi (ibis), throkeri (seagull) and pargi (wallaby) he perceived and transcribed them as toloperi, torokeri and paragi respectively.

Aboriginal Legal Aid lawyer and land council lawyer Paul Burke, first in his book Law's Anthropology, and in a later essay, argues that Tindale's map of Australian territories had not only achieved "iconic status", but had begun to exercise a deleterious impact on native title judgements made in suits that have been brought to court by Indigenous peoples following the landmark Mabo decision of 1992, and negatively affect their rights to land tenure in a number of cases. In evaluating claims, there is, Burke argues, a tendency to exaggerate the value of the earliest ethnographic reports of anthropologists like A. R. Radcliffe-Brown, A. P. Elkin, Tindale and others, and privilege it over more recent scholarship, although the accuracy of many of these "classic" texts and papers has, over time, often come to be viewed sceptically by modern anthropologists. Specifically, Burke noted that in his magnum opus, Tindale had recognised and mapped in the land of a Djukan people, despite the fact that it was absent from the map of the area prepared by Ernest Wurms. Tindale simply drew on Elkin's authority to do so. Again, Tindale conjured up, or made a separate entry for, a tribe, the Jadira, on the basis of very scant evidence, but there is almost no independent testimony that would allow the inference. Inaccuracies of this type compromise modern native title claims, since the authority of early ethnographers for the "extinction" of tribes and for their putative territorial boundaries weighs more heavily than modern anthropological studies of their descendants. If, for example, there are no "Jadira", but their ostensible land was mapped by Tindale, the actual tribes in that area face immense difficulties in proving their links to what is conventionally accepted to be "Jadira" territory.

Ray Wood argues that Tindale's mapping of Cape York Peninsula tribes is suspect, since there is evidence he disregarded the in situ observations of reliable earlier ethnographers in favour of material he later gathered from informants among the remnants in places like Palm Island.

Margaret Sharpe has found problems with Tindale's mapping in South East Queensland, since he generally located other groups where Sharpe puts the Yugambeh people.

=== Links to eugenics ===
When Tindale was writing up his work on Aboriginal people at the University of Virginia in the 1930s, he worked alongside eugenics scientists who supported a proposed law on involuntary sterilisation of women with disabilities or mental illness, and who influenced the Nazi program in Germany. He also wrote of his attendance at a Nazi rally in Munich, writing of Hitler as an "impressive figure".

A 2007 article looking at Tindale and Birdsell's 1939 expedition to Cape Barren Island reserve argues that this "was the last major eugenic research project to be undertaken in Australia".

One critic of Tindale's work on Aboriginal people wrote in 2018 that it "contributed to a larger landscape of objectification and categorisation of racialised ideas about Aboriginal people and was part of a global movement of analysis using the ideologies of eugenics, concerned with racial purity, blood quantum and hierarchies of race, and phrenology".

== Works ==
=== Major work ===
- Aboriginal Tribes of Australia: Their Terrain, Environmental Controls, Distribution, Limits, and Proper Names. University of California Press. 1974. ISBN 978-0-520-02005-4.

=== Co-author ===
With Harold Arthur Lindsay:

- Aboriginal Australians. Jacaranda Press. 1963.
- The First Walkabout (1954), illustrated by Madeleine Boyce (children's novel)
- Rangatira (1959) (children's novel)
