= Cath Crowley =

Australian novelist

- Born: 1971 (age 54–55); Rural Victoria
- Occupations: fiction author, freelance writer and part time teacher
- Known for: Friction Author
- Notable work: Graffiti Moon and Words in Deep Blue.
- Awards: 2011 Prime Minister's Literary Award, 2017 Griffith University, Queensland Literary Awards , Winner for Gold Inky Award 2017.

Cath Crowley is a young adult fiction author based in Melbourne, Australia. She has been shortlisted and received numerous literary awards including the 2011 Prime Minister's Literary Award for Young Adult Fiction for her novel Graffiti Moon and, in 2017, the Griffith University Young Adult Book Award at the Queensland Literary Awards for Words in Deep Blue.

Crowley was born in 1971 in rural Victoria. Her books include novel Graffiti Moon and, in 2017, the Griffith University Young Adult Book Award at the Queensland Literary Awards for Words in Deep Blue.Moon. She is currently a freelance writer and part time teacher. Her work has been published in Australia and internationally.

== Early life and career ==
Crowley grew up with three siblings and a dog called Elvis. She took courses in radio production and literature at university and then worked as an English teacher for some time.

She hadn't always wanted to be a writer but was later convinced while traveling in Europe. She often wrote letters home to her brother who created a musical, Journey Girl, inspired by these letters.

After returning from Europe, Crowley studied professional writing and editing at RMIT. She went on to write articles for newspapers and magazines and began her first novel, The Life and Times of Gracie Faltrain.

Crowley's most recent novel, Words in Deep Blue is a story of love, loss and the power of words. Her writing got a kick-start while she was grieving for her father, "I realised grief is very particular to each person," she said. Crowley now runs student writing workshops and freelance writes.

== Novels ==
- The Life and Times of Gracie Faltrain (2004)
- Chasing Charlie Duskin (2005)
- Gracie Faltrain Takes Control (2006)
- Gracie Faltrain Gets It Right (Finally) (2008)
- A Little Wanting Song (2010)
- Graffiti Moon (2010)
- Rosie Staples' Minor Magical Misunderstanding (2010)
- Words in Deep Blue (2016), Sydney, New South Wales Pan by Pan Macmillan Australia, ISBN 978-1-74261-238-6
- Take Three Girls (2017) (written collaboratively with Fiona Wood and Simmone Howell)

== Awards ==
=== Graffiti Moon ===
- Winner for NSW Premier's Literary Awards Ethel Turner Prize 2011
- Winner for Prime Minister's Literary Award for Young Adult Fiction 2011
- Winner for APA Book Design Awards Best Designed Young Adult Book 2011
- Short-listed for CBCA Book of the Year for Older Readers 2011
- Short-listed for Victorian Premier's Literary Awards Prize for Writing for Young Adults 2011
- Short-listed for Queensland Premier's Literary Awards Young Adult Book Award 2011

=== Words in Deep Blue ===
- Winner, Griffith University Young Adult Book Award, Queensland Literary Awards 2017
- Winner for Gold Inky Award 2017
- Short-listed for Indie Book Awards Young Adult 2017
- Long-listed for CBCA Book of the Year for Older Readers 2017
- Winner for Prime Minister's Literary Award for Young Adult Fiction 2017

=== Chasing Charlie Duskin ===
- Short-listed for the CBCA’s prestigious Book of the Year
