= Pastures of the Blue Crane =

Book by Hesba Fay Brinsmead

- First edition
- Author: Hesba Fay Brinsmead
- Illustrator: Annette Macarthur-Onslow
- Language: English
- Publisher: Oxford University Press
- Publication date: 1964
- Publication place: Australia

Pastures of the Blue Crane is an Australian novel by Hesba Fay Brinsmead, published in 1964. The novel won the Children's Book of the Year Award: Older Readers in 1965. It was adapted for television in 1969. It has recently been reprinted due to renewed interest by University of Queensland Press in 2018.

== Synopsis ==
The story opens in Melbourne, where Amaryllis Merewether, aged 16, is told her father has died and that she is to inherit his farm on the North coast of New South Wales. There is a catch; the co-heir is the grandfather she never knew she had. The snooty schoolgirl and the ramshackle old pensioner are clearly at odds, yet both are curious about the farm and agree to take the train together and visit their property.

The pair are captivated by the beautiful, almost tropical landscape, and soon its luxuriance begins to work its magic on lonely, isolated Ryl and tetchy Dusty. Too young for university, and with nothing else to do in the meantime, Ryl renovates the old farmhouse and makes of it the first real home she has ever had. She makes new friends, including the mysterious taxi driver, Perry. To her astonishment, she finds relatives her father never told her about ... and discovers why he kept them hidden.

== Reception ==
Pastures of the Blue Crane won the Children's Book Council of Australia's Children's Book of the Year Award: Older Readers in 1965 and the Mary Gilmore Prize, and established its author's reputation. It remained popular into the 1970s and is again gaining popularity due to Brinsmead's ability to capture the unique feel of the landscape in the Tweed Valley in Northern NSW. Many have never forgotten first reading this book and the sight of a Blue Crane can still evoke these memories years later.

Although the book's undercurrents of mixed-race shame and racial secrecy had caused the novel to fall from favour, it is now considered worthy of study in secondary schools as a fascinating glimpse of a little-known episode in Australia's history, when Pacific Islanders were shipped in to work on plantations in NSW and Queensland.

== Television ==
Pastures of the Blue Crane
- Written by: Eleanor Witcombe
- Directed by: Tom Jeffrey
- Starring: Jeanie Drynan; Harold Hopkins; Harry Lawrence; Queenie Ashton; Peter McPhie; Arthur Toar; Sheila Kennelly
- Country of origin: Australia
- Original language: English
- No. of episodes: 5

Production
- Producer: Brett Porter
- Running time: 30 mins

Original release
- Network: ABC Television
- Release: 1969

The book was adapted for television by the Australian Broadcasting Corporation (ABC) in 1969. In August 2018 it was released on DVD for sale by ABC Library Sales after a resurgence in public interest.

It was the most expensive production from the ABC drama department since My Brother Jack in 1964, although the budget did not stretch to colour. Shooting took place in Sydney, Murwillumbah, Terranora, Coolangatta and Brisbane. The house featuring in the television series is named "Lovat Brae" and was built by Thomas Fraser in 1904 and still exists today.

== Cast ==
Actor	Role
Jeanie Drynan	Amaryllis Mereweather
Harold Hopkins	Perry the taxi driver
Harry Lawrence	Grandpa Mereweather
Queenie Ashton	
Peter McPhee	
Arthur Toar	
Sheila Kennelly	Rose Bradley
Gordon McDougall	
