= The Green Laurel =

Book by Eleanor Spence

- First edition cover
- Author: Eleanor Spence
- Cover artist: Geraldine Spence
- Language: English
- Genre: Children's fiction
- Publisher: Oxford University Press
- Publication date: 1963
- Publication place: Australia
- Media type: Print
- Pages: 181pp
- Preceded by: Lillipilly Hill
- Followed by: The Year of the Currawong

The Green Laurel (1963) is a novel for children by Australian author Eleanor Spence; it was illustrated by Geraldine Spence. It won the Children's Book of the Year Award: Older Readers in 1964.

== Story outline ==
The novel centres on a girl whose father runs a fair-ground train at a holiday resort. Illness forces him to give up his job and the family move to a Sydney suburb close to a migrant camp.

== Critical reception ==
Writing in The Canberra Times K. Masterman noted: "The interesting and fascinating story brings out well the character of the two contrasted environments, and without any suggestion of preaching establishes the sound values that are felt without needing to be expressed in this writer's work."

== Awards ==
- 1964 – winner Children's Book of the Year Award: Older Readers

== See also ==
- 1963 in literature
