= David Rowbotham =

Australian poet and journalist

- Born: David Harold Rowbotham; 27 August 1924; Toowoomba, Queensland, Australia
- Died: 6 October 2010 (aged 86); Brisbane, Queensland, Australia
- Occupations: Poet and journalist
- Writing career
- Period: 1946-2010
- Notable awards: 2007 Patrick White Award

David Harold Rowbotham AM (27 August 1924 – 6 October 2010) was an Australian poet and journalist.

== Early life ==
Rowbotham was born in the Darling Downs of Queensland, in the city of Toowoomba. He attended Toowoomba Grammar School and later studied at the University of Queensland and the University of Sydney. During the Second World War, he served on the Pacific front.

== Literary career ==
Rowbotham worked as a journalist for the Toowoomba Chronicle and Brisbane Courier-Mail from 1955 to 1964. He lectured in English at the University of Queensland between 1965 and 1969, then became the literary critic for the Brisbane Courier-Mail from 1969 to 1980, and later its literary editor from 1980 to 1987.

Though lyrical in form, Rowbotham's poems often focus on history. After Penguin published his Selected Poems in 1994, which covered fifty years of work, Rowbotham entered a productive late period that culminated in the well-received Poems for America in 2002. In 2005, Picaro Press's Wagtail series published a chapbook of Rowbotham's titled The Brown Island.

== Later life ==
A friend and mentor to many Australian writers, Rowbotham also maintained wide international connections.

He died on 6 October 2010.

== Awards and recognition ==
Rowbotham was made a Member of the Order of Australia (AM) in 1991 for his service to literature.

In 2007, he received the Patrick White Award, which was presented to him on 9 November 2007 in Brisbane.

== Bibliography ==
- Ploughman and Poet (1954)
- Inland (1958)
- All the Room (1964)
- Bungalow and Hurricane (1967)
- The Makers of the Ark (1970)
- The Pen of Feathers (1971)
- Maydays (1980)
- Selected Poems (1994)
- The Ebony Gates (1996)
- Poems for America (2002)
- The Brown Island (2005)
- The Cave in the Sky (2005)
- The Star of Engelmeer (2006)
- Rogue Moons (2007)
