= Josh (novel) =

1971 young adult novel by Ivan Southall

- Front cover of first edition
- Author: Ivan Southall
- Language: English
- Genre: Young adult realist novel
- Publisher: Angus & Robertson
- Publication date: August 1971
- Publication place: Australia
- Media type: Print (hardcover)
- Pages: 179 pp (first edition)
- ISBN: 0207954313
- OCLC: 389149
- LC Class: PZ7.S726 Jo

Josh is a young-adult novel by Ivan Southall, first published in 1971 by Angus & Robertson of Sydney, Australia. Southall was the first Australian to win the annual Carnegie Medal from the Library Association, recognising the year's best children's book by a British subject. Both U.K. and U.S. editions were published within the calendar year.

The story is set in rural Victoria. According to a retrospective citation by the British librarians, city boy "Josh's stay at Ryan Creek belongs to any time and place where people from different worlds confront one another."

== Plot summary ==
14-year-old Josh Plowman arrives in a country town for a week's visit with his great-aunt, the Plowman family matriarch. The city boy from Melbourne is immediately at odds with the Ryan Creek youngsters. His writing poetry and his dislike for hunting make him a target for the local boys. Initial misunderstandings eventually explode into violence. A traditional hero might have faced and fought the bullies but Josh shows a different sort of courage and integrity by choosing to walk away with dignity.

== Style and reception ==
Southall himself said of Josh that it might not be his best book but it certainly was his most unusual. It is written from Josh's point of view, the taut language effectively conveying his distress and frustration. Michele Gill cites Josh as an early example of the sensitive and vulnerable hero, a theme which became more and more prominent in children's literature afterward.

A reviewer from the Australian Book Review in 1971 commented that the book was 'neurotic and hysterical' and wondered if there could be a sadist lurking within the author. A later reviewer commented: "From an adult perspective the writing is superb, the descriptions so full of feeling; but one wonders if this can be appreciated without an adult's accumulated range of experiences upon which to draw."

== See also ==
Awards
Preceded by The God Beneath the Sea	Carnegie Medal recipient 1971	Succeeded by Watership Down
