= Mavis Thorpe Clark =

Australian writer

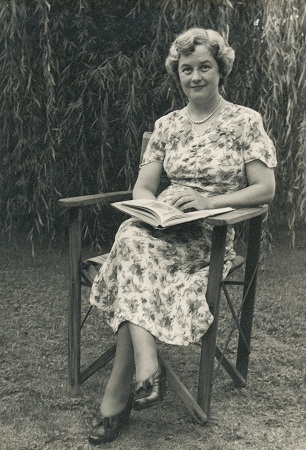
- in 1948
- Born: Mavis Rose Clark; 26 June 1909; Melbourne, Victoria, Australia
- Died: 8 July 1999 (aged 90); Melbourne, Victoria, Australia
- Occupations: novelist and writer for children
- Writing career
- Language: English
- Years active: 1930-1993
- Notable works: The Min-Min; The Brown Land Was Green
- Notable awards: Children's Book of the Year Award: Older Readers

Mavis Thorpe Clark AM (26 June 1909 – 8 July 1999) was an Australian novelist and writer for children who was born in Melbourne, Victoria, Australia.

Clark was educated at Methodist Ladies' College in Melbourne and published her first work in the school's magazine. She then published prolifically throughout her writing career, writing mainly for children and young adults, but also writing biographies, short stories, newspaper serials and non-fiction.

In 1932, Clark married Harold Latham and in 1936 the first of their two daughters, Beverley Jeanne, was born. A second daughter, Ronda Faye, followed in 1944.

She was nominated for a number of awards and was awarded the Children's Book of the Year Award: Older Readers for her work The Min-Min in 1967.

In 1996 she was made AM for service to the arts as the author of children's literature and as an active member of writers' organizations in Australia.

She died in 1999.

== Bibliography ==
=== Children's and Young Adult fiction ===
- Hatherly's First Fifteen (1930)
- The Red School House (1934)
- Sunnymount School (1936)
- The Boy from the Mallee (1939)
- Dark Pool Island (1949)
- The Twins from Timber Creek (1949)
- Home Again at Timber Creek (1950)
- Missing Gold (1951)
- Jingaroo (1951)
- The Brown Land Was Green (1956)
- Gully of Gold (1958)
- Pony from Tarella (1959)
- They Came South (1963)
- The Min-Min (1966)
- Blue Above the Trees (1967)
- Spark of Opal (1968)
- Nowhere to Hide (1969)
- Iron Mountain (1970)
- New Golden Mountain (1973)
- Wildfire (1973)
- The Sky is Free (1974)
- The Hundred Islands (1976)
- Spanish Queen (1977)
- The Lilly-Pilly (1979)
- A Stranger Came to the Mine (1980)
- Solomon's Child (1981)

=== Non-fiction ===
- Pastor Doug : The Story of an Aboriginal Leader (1965)
- A Pack-Tracker (1968)
- Joan & Betty Rayner : Strolling Players (1972) – biography
- The Boy from Cumeroogunga (1979) – biography
- Young and Brave (1984) – biography
- No Mean Destiny : The Story of the War Widows' Guild of Australia 1945-85 (1986)
- Trust the Dream : An Autobiography (2004) – autobiography
