= Eleanor Spence =

Australian author

- Born: Eleanor Rachel Kelly; 21 October 1928; Sydney, New South Wales
- Died: 30 September 2008 (aged 79); Erina, New South Wales, Australia
- Writing career
- Language: English
- Years active: 1958-1991
- Notable works: The Green Laurel; The October Child
- Notable awards: Children's Book of the Year Award: Older Readers 1964, 1977

Eleanor Spence AM (1928–2008) was an Australian author of novels for young adults and older children. Her books explore a wide range of issues, including Australian history, religion, autism, bigotry, materialism and alienation. She was appointed a Member of the Order of Australia in the 2006 Australia Day Honours.

== Biography ==
Eleanor Rachel Therese Spence was born on 21 October 1928 in Sydney, Australia. She attended the University of Sydney, gaining her Bachelor of Arts degree in 1949. During the next decade she worked as a teacher and as a children's librarian. These experiences led to her interest in writing for young people. Her first novel, Patterson's Track, was published in 1958.

Eleanor Spence was awarded the CBCA Book of the Year in 1964 for The Green Laurel and in 1977 for The October Child. Me and Jeshua and The Family Book of Mary Claire received CBCA commendations, and Seventh Pebble won the Ethel Turner prize. In 1999, Eleanor Spence received the Australia Council for the Arts Emeritus award for her outstanding and livelong contribution to Australian literature. In 2006 she became a Member of the Order of Australia for her contribution to Australian literature and her services to autism.

She died in Erina, New South Wales on 30 September 2008, aged 79.

== Themes and subjects ==
Almost all Eleanor Spence's books are set in New South Wales, with an emphasis on authentic Australian settings and characterisations. The Family Book of Mary Claire covers the extraordinary history of two families on the NSW coast. The Switherby Pilgrims and Jamberoo Road are about early settlers in the state, orphaned "pilgrims" from England, struggling to establish a new home in the untamed Australia of the 1820s.

Two books, Me and Jeshua and Miranda Going Home, are set by contrast in first century Palestine. The first is about the childhood of Jesus of Nazareth, the second about the daughter of a mixed marriage between a Jewish woman and a Roman centurion.

Many of her books demonstrate acute observation of family life, revealed with sensitivity and humour. The Somerville family in The Green Laurel is one example. She has spoken of a childhood fascination with orphans: "I yearned to adopt neglected infants, [but] had to settle for adopting stray kittens or turning my assortment of dolls into orphanage-waifs." and orphans often feature in her books, notably the settler books and The Left Overs.

Eleanor Spence was one of the first authors for older children to include issues such as disability, prejudice and homosexuality in her books. Glen, the protagonist of The Nothing Place is partially deaf, and he strikes up a friendship with another "outsider", Reggie, an old meths drinker. Douglas in The October Child often resents having to look after his younger brother Carl, whose autism has disrupted their happy family. In A Candle for St. Antony Justin's friendship with Rudi develops an intensity he lacks the maturity to deal with. The Seventh Pebble deals with Catholic/Protestant conflict and teen pregnancy. In Time to go Home Rowan's decision to coach an Aboriginal boy to play his beloved Rugby Union leads to trouble.

Often in her books she presents the situation of the young person who is in some way an outsider in his social setting. This alienation becomes the springboard for learning to overcome difficulties and growing in self-knowledge and self-confidence.

Maurice Saxby, the children's literature expert, wrote: "More than any other writers, Eleanor Spence and Joan Phipson have perhaps helped guide the direction of Australian children's literature in the past 30 years. They have both expressed in their novels of family life not only social changes but the concerns and preoccupations of a growingly complex Australian society."

== Critical appraisal ==
"Her fine characterizations, touches of humor, and insight into youth give Mrs. Spence's novels appeal far beyond her own land."

"Eleanor Spence: Observer of Family Life" in Innocence and Experience: Essays on Contemporary Australian Children's Writers (1981), by Walter McVitty, pp 67–98. This is an overview and analysis of Spence's work, including a brief biographical sketch and a bibliography of her books. "Eleanor Spence is a writer with whose work increased familiarity breeds content—beyond the apparent blandness a richly rewarding experience awaits the reader who is prepared to give it the close attention it deserves."

"A Conversation with Eleanor Spence," by Paul J. Bisnette, in Orana: Journal of School and Children's Librarianship 17 (February 1981). Spence discusses her life and work in an interview.

"Eleanor Spence: A Critical Appreciation" by Ruth Grgurich, in Orana 18 (February 1982), analyses Spence's fiction for teenagers.

== Bibliography ==
- Patterson's Track (1958)
- The Summer In Between (1959)
- Lillipilly Hill (1960)
- The Green Laurel (1963)
- The Year of the Currawong (1965)
- The Switherby Pilgrims (1967)
- Jamberoo Road (1969)
- The Nothing Place (1972)
- Time to go Home (1973)
- The October Child (alternative title The Devil Hole) (1976)
- A Candle for St. Antony (1977)
- Seventh Pebble (1980)
- The Left Overs (1982)
- Me and Jeshua (1984)
- Miranda Going Home (1985)
- Deezle Boy (1987)
- Another October Child: Recollections of Eleanor Spence (1988)
- The Family Book of Mary Claire (1990)
- Another Sparrow Singing (1991)
