= Musette Morell =

Australian playwright and children's writer

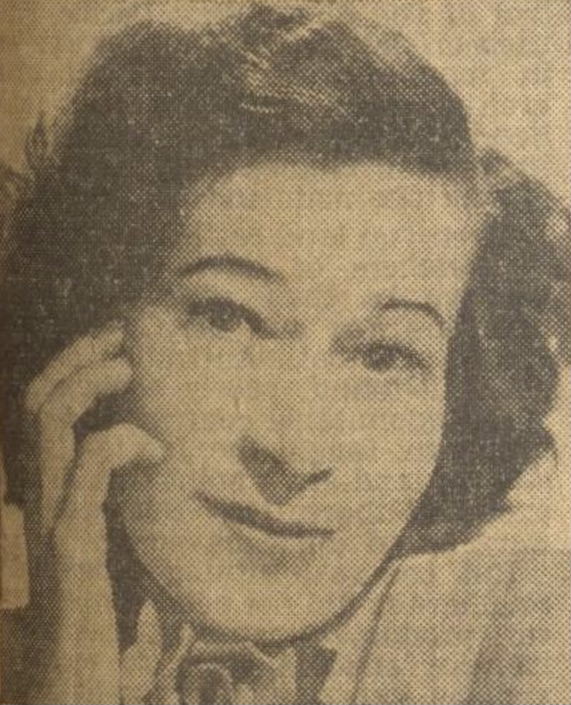
- Born: Moyna Ann Martin; 1898
- Died: 29 September 1950 (aged 51–52); Hornsby, New South Wales, Australia
- Occupations: Playwright; children's writer
- Writing career
- Pen name: Fiona O'Farrell; Muse M
- Notable works: Three Radio Plays; Bush Cobbers; Ten Puppet Plays

Musette Morell (1898 – 29 September 1950) was an Australian playwright and children's writer. She wrote both for the stage and for radio.

Born Moyna Ann Martin in 1898, she began writing poetry and short stories for magazines including The New Triad, The Bulletin and The Australian Woman's Mirror during the late 1920s.

With theatre director Duncan Macdougall, she produced plays at the Playbox Theatre in 1930 and 1931, having earlier written about his efforts to establish that community theatre in Sydney in 1927. Her first play, The Wife Exchange, was performed at the Tom Thumb Theatre in February 1934, followed later that year by Take It or Leave It.

She wrote a number of plays which were produced for radio by the ABC. She was also skilled in adapting children's classics, such as Gulliver's Travels and The Water Babies as radio serials for a young audience. Her two books for children, The Antics of Algy and Bush Cobbers, were published from successful radio serials she had written for the ABC. Bush Cobbers was highly commended at the 1948 Children's Book Council of Australia Book of the Year Awards. Three Radio Plays included Webs of Our Weaving, one of six Australian plays selected by the ABC to commemorate Australia's Jubilee in 1951.

Morell died at her home in Hornsby, New South Wales on 29 September 1950.

== Selected works ==
- The Wife Exchange, 1934
- Take It or Leave It, 1934
- The Quick and the Dead, 1935
- His Gentle Art of Making Enemies, 1937
- The Antics of Algy, 1946
- Three Radio Plays, 1948
  - Webs of Our Weaving
  - The Better Road
  - Even the Birds of the Air
- Bush Cobbers, 1948
- Ten Puppet Plays, 1950
