= Patricia Wrightson =

Australian children's writer (1921–2010)

- Photograph of Patricia Wrightson, née Alice Patricia Furlonger
- Born: Alice Patricia Furlonger; 19 July 1921; Lismore, New South Wales, Australia
- Died: 15 March 2010 (aged 88); Lismore, New South Wales, Australia
- Occupations: Writer, editor
- Writing career
- Pen name: Patricia Wrightson
- Language: English
- Period: 1955–2004
- Genres: Children's literature, folklore, magic realism
- Subject: Fantasy (nonfiction)
- Notable awards: Hans Christian Andersen Award for Writing; 1988; Order of the British Empire

Patricia Wrightson OBE (19 June 1921 – 15 March 2010) was an Australian writer of several highly regarded and influential children's books. Employing a magic realism style, her books, including the award-winning The Nargun and the Stars (1973), were among the first Australian books for children to draw on Australian Aboriginal mythology. Her 27 books have been published in 16 languages.

For her "lasting contribution" as a children's writer, she received the biennial Hans Christian Andersen Medal in 1986.

== Personal life ==
Wrightson was born Patricia Furlonger on 19 June 1921 in Bangalow, near Lismore, New South Wales, the third of six children. Her father was a country solicitor. She was formerly educated through the State Correspondence School for Isolated Children and St Catherine's College, and also attended a private school in Stanthorpe, Queensland, for one year. Of her education, Wrightson later wrote, “I was really educated in literature, philosophy and wonder by my father; and in the social sciences by my mother. My most profitable year of schooling was the one in which I abandoned the syllabus altogether and spent the year, without permission or guidance, in discovering Shakespeare”.

During World War II Wrightson worked in a munitions factory in Sydney.

Wrightson married in 1943, and had two children, Peter and Jenny, before divorcing in 1953. She worked as secretary and administrator at Bonalbo District Hospital, from 1946 to 1960, and Sydney District Nursing Association, from 1960 to 1964.

Wrightson died of "natural causes" on 15 March 2010, a few days after entering a New South Wales hospital.

== Literary career ==
Wrightson served as Assistant Editor and later editor of the School Magazine, in Sydney, from 1964 to 1970, a literary publication for children.

She wrote 27 books during her lifetime and entwined Australian Aboriginal mythology into her writing. After beginning with straightforward adventure stories, Wrightson's writing developed to reveal two key characteristics: her use of Aboriginal folklore, with its rich fantasy and mystery, and her understanding of the importance of the land. Author, editor and academic Mark MacLeod wrote that "Wrightson thought that it might be possible to reconcile Indigenous and non-Indigenous Australian cultures and create a new kind of pan-Australian narrative, in which the human characters from both cultures were strongly aware of and influenced by the metaphysical world that Indigenous Australians had known for 60 000 years."

== Controversy ==
Initially, Wrighton's use of Aboriginal myths was appreciated by Aboriginal leaders because of her evident respect and care for their traditions, however, as times changed, Wrightson's use of Aboriginal myths and legends in her fiction came to be questioned by some academics, including New Zealander Clare Bradford, who accused Wrightson of “appropriating and controlling strategies.” Wrightson’s editor Max Macleod stressed that Wrightson’s use of Aboriginal mythology was respectful and inclusive: "She was trying to create a kind of pan-Australia – a whole new Australian mythology which was part non-indigenous and part indigenous."

In 1978 the Aboriginal playwright Jack Davis praised Wrightson’s work to the International Board on Books for Young People. Davis "encouraged her to be even bolder in her writing and, far from giving up in fear, to go on." Brian Attebery, American writer and author of Strategies of Fantasy, wrote "No amount of care can make [Wrightson] into a tribal elder, nor can her use of Aboriginal folklore ever be fully ‘authentic’. However, she can become… a participant in the reshaping of tradition for a modern world in which authenticity is an inaccessible ideal."

== Awards ==
- The biennial Hans Christian Andersen Award conferred by the International Board on Books for Young People is the highest career recognition available to a writer or illustrator of children's books. Wrightson was a runner-up for the writing award in 1984 and won it in 1986. The illustration winner that year was Robert Ingpen, who had collaborated with Wrightson on The Nargun and the Stars (1973), her fantasy novel based on Aboriginal mythology. They remain the only Australians among more than 60 Andersen Medal recipients.
- Wrightson was made an officer of the Order of the British Empire in 1977 and she won the Australian Dromkeen Medal in 1984, also for her cumulative service to children's literature.
- Many of her books made the shortlist for the annual Australian Children's Book of the Year Award, which she won four times: in 1956 for her debut novel The Crooked Snake, in 1974 for The Nargun and The Stars, in 1978 for The Ice is Coming and in 1984 for A Little Fear.
- Wrightson won the Ditmar Award from the annual Australian National Science Fiction Convention in 1982 for Behind the Wind, as the year's Best Long Australian Science Fiction or Fantasy.
- The Children's Literature section of the New South Wales Premier's Literary Awards began as a single award in 1979, but was redefined in 1999 to create the Patricia Wrightson Prize (for writing for a primary school audience) named in her honour, and the Ethel Turner Prize (for a secondary school audience).
- Patricia Wrightson was awarded an Honorary Doctor of Letters by Southern Cross University in September, 2004.

== Selected works ==
- The Crooked Snake (1955). Winner CBCA Book of the Year: Older Readers 1956.
- The Bunyip Hole (1958). Commended CBCA Book of the Year 1959.
- The Rocks of Honey (1960) ISBN 978-0140302691 audiobook ISBN 978-0091197605
- The Feather Star (1962). Commended CBCA Book of the Year 1963.
- Down to Earth (1965)
- A Racecourse for Andy (1968) ISBN 9780152650803
- I Own the Racecourse! (1968). Highly commended CBCA Book of the Year 1969.
- Beneath the Sun: an Australian collection for children (1972)
- An Older Kind of Magic (1972). Highly commended CBA Book of the Year 1973. ISBN 978-0091114305 ISBN 978-0140307399
- The Nargun and the Stars (1973). Winner CBCA Book of the Year: Older Readers 1974. ISBN 9780689504037 ISBN 9780140307801
- Emu Stew: an illustrated collection of stories and poems for children (1976)
- The Human Experience of Fantasy (1978)
- Balyet (1989). Shortlist CBCA Book of the Year: Older Readers 1990. ISBN 9780140343397
- Night Outside (1979) ISBN 9780689503634
- A Little Fear (1983). Winner CBCA Book of the Year: Older Readers 1984. ISBN 9780140318470
- The Haunted Rivers (1983)
- Moon-Dark (1987) ISBN 9780689504518
- The Song of Wirrun omnibus (1987) ISBN 978-0712611503 ISBN 978-0140365887
  - The Ice is Coming (1977). Winner CBCA Book of the Year: Older Readers 1978. ISBN 9780689500817 ISBN 9780345332486
  - The Dark Bright Water (1978) ISBN 9780689501227 ISBN 9780345332493
  - Behind the Wind aka Journey Behind the Wind (1981) Highly commended CBCA Book of the Year 1982. ISBN 9780345332509
- The Old, Old Ngarang (1989)
- The Sugar-Gum Tree (1991). Shortlist CBCA Book of the Year: Younger Readers 1992. ISBN 9780670839100
- Shadows of Time (1994)
- Rattler's Place (1997). Honour Book CBCA Book of the Year: Younger Readers 1998 (in Aussie Bites series) audiobook ISBN 9781740308458
- The Water Dragons (in Aussie Bites series)
