= The Survivor (1972 film) =

1972 Australian film

- Based on: The Survivor by Thomas Keneally
- Written by: Thomas Keneally
- Directed by: Alan Burke
- Starring: Wynn Roberts; Dinah Shearing; Enid Lorimer; Arthur Dignam
- Country of origin: Australia
- Original language: English

Production
- Cinematography: Peter Hendry
- Running time: 75 minutes
- Production company: ABC

Original release
- Network: ABC
- Release: 5 March 1972

The Survivor is a 1972 Australian television film based on the novel Thomas Keneally of the same name. The film was originally broadcast on ABC on 5 March 1972.

== Cast ==
- Wynn Roberts
- Enid Lorimer as Belle Leeming, the widow
- Arthur Dignam
- Dinah Shearing
- Alastair Duncan

== Production ==
Thomas Keneally adapted the script himself. It was his first screenplay and he enjoyed the experience so much he wrote other scripts for the ABC such as Essington and Behind the Legend.

The production was shot in Sydney. Director Alan Burke says Charles Russell was the main executive on it - he is credited as script editor although that does not give a guide as to the extent of his contribution. There was some location work done at Richmond Air Base.

John Cameron, head of drama at the ABC at the time, said the novel was bought by the ABC because it had won a prize. He later said "that was a terrible book and a dreadful script" but claims Charles Russell improved it with some script editing although he says Russell "wasn't very happy with it."

== Reception ==
The Age thought the original novel was "one of the most tedious books ever published in Australia" but felt the television version "gripped the imagination as the book never could."

Burke later recalled, "I don't think I pulled it off. It was I think a bit inadequate... It just didn't add up somehow. I just didn't feel happy about it. Maybe it was partly the adaptation that Tom had said he tried the various styles, maybe that had something to do with the fact they didn't quite marry."
