= Eugene Stockton =

Australian priest, educator and archaeologist (1934–2026)

Father Eugene Stockton
- Born: 30 November 1934
- Died: 5 August 2026 (aged 91)
- Occupations: Priest; Community worker Archaeologist

Eugene Stockton (30 November 1934 – 5 August 2026) was an Australian priest, archaeologist, scholar, Aboriginal chaplain, teacher and educator, who for many years lived in the Blue Mountains region of New South Wales, Australia. He was fondly known as the “Indiana Jones” of the Catholic priesthood. He survived war zones, uncovered archaeological breakthroughs, tackled 14 languages, started the Aboriginal Catholic Ministry and found time to complete two doctorates for his work as a seminary lecturer.

== Early life and education ==
Eugene Stockton grew up at Lawson in the Blue Mountains where an interest in the natural environment was nurtured. His mother Elsie, converted to the Catholic faith while working with religious sisters in the laundry of St Columba’s Seminary, Springwood. His father died tragically a few months after his birth. At only six years old the young Eugene Stockton announced that he was going to become a priest. He boarded at St Joseph’s College, Hunters Hill for 2 years before being accepted into the seminary when he was 13. After years of study at St Columba's Seminary, Springwood NSW and St Patrick's Seminary, Manly he was ordained a priest at St Mary's Cathedral, Sydney in 1958 aged 22. He continued studies and was the first to gain a doctorate in Theology from the Catholic Institute of Sydney.

He lectured at St Columba's and St Patrick's Seminary before travelling overseas to Rome where he completed a Licentiate in Sacred Scripture at the Pontifical Biblical Institute. He then spent four years in Jerusalem and studied at the Studium Biblicum Franciscanum, a Franciscan academic society and the Ecole Biblique et Archeologique Francaise, a French academic establishment in Jerusalem specializing in archaeology and biblical exegesis.

== Academic career ==
Stockton was living at the British School of Archaeology in Jerusalem when the Six Day War broke out in 1967. He was evacuated to Cyprus and later returned to relieve the Director of the British School of Archaeology and work on a thesis based on Arabian Cult Stones. During this time he befriended the famed scholar Roland de Vaux at the Ecole Biblique by helping with relief supplies from the British Consulate which was within the British School of Archaeology. Roland de Vaux influenced and guided Stockton with his thesis.

He gained considerable excavation experience while working on digs in the Jordan Valley near Jericho for the British School of Archaeology. These digs would continue for months at a time. Stockton claimed that once stratigraphic excavation experience was obtained on difficult mud brick sites, one was able to complete any other excavation work with ease.

Returning to Sydney, Australia, Stockton completed a doctorate in Archaeology and Semitic Studies at the University of Sydney with his thesis on the Arabian Cult Stones. He continued to lecture at Catholic seminaries in Sydney and later returned to the Middle East for further academic studies.

In Jordan he was once arrested and imprisoned on suspicion of being a Palestinian spy because of his Arabic dialect, but released after more thorough interrogation by an English-speaking officer.

== Priestly ministry ==
On returning to Sydney, Stockton worked as a chaplain to Sydney University and assisted at various parishes in Sydney including Parramatta, Narrabeen, DeeWhy, Mt Druitt, Penrith, Riverstone, Springwood and Lawson. He also worked in far western NSW at Bourke. In 1986 he was involved with founding the Aboriginal Catholic Ministry in Parramatta. Cardinal Gilroy appointed Fr. Eugene Stockton as the first Chaplain to Aboriginal Catholics in Sydney, and for this ministry he then adopted a model where the community ran the ministry. Stockton said "the idea of the Aboriginal Catholic Ministry was to get away from the mission idea and for Aboriginal people to run the centres themselves with help from outsiders like myself ", and further he said "All over Australia, Aboriginal Catholics have been developing modes of worship and spirituality that are special to them".

== Archaeology and theology ==
With his training in archaeology, Stockton became increasingly interested in Australian aboriginal archaeology together with its spirituality. He pursued archaeological investigations in the Blue Mountains, the north and central coasts and far west of New South Wales. He also investigated areas in the Kimberley of Western Australia and Central Australia.

His most important work were six excavations in the Blue Mountains of NSW where many Aboriginal artefacts were discovered. The excavations at Kings Tableland, Wentworth Falls indicated continuous occupation to as far back as 22,300 BP. Excavations near the Nepean River at the base of the Blue Mountains found artefacts indicating a human presence up to 50,000 years ago.

== Blue Mountain Educational and Research Trust ==
In 2008 Stockton established the Blue Mountain Educational and Research Trust to promote local Blue Mountains research and writing, especially in Aboriginal, religious and spiritual studies.

Stockton wrote over 150 articles and many books on biblical studies, Christianity, theology, archaeological surveys, and Aboriginal spirituality. In his book Australian Religious Thought, Wayne Hudson says "Stockton seeks to pioneer an Australian theology, integrating Biblical insights, a reverence for the land and Aboriginal spirituality". He further says that Stockton's theology is indebted to the theology of Meister Eckhart, to the nondualist theology of Ramon Panikkar, and to Eastern Orthodoxy.

Stockton's book The Deep Within: Towards An Archetypal Theology explores his conviction that Aboriginal spirituality must eventually find its place in the mainstream and that the mutual engagement of European and Aboriginal thinking can only be possible at the deepest level of consciousness.

== Death ==
Stockton died on 5 August 2026, at the age of 91.

== Published works ==
- Stockton, E. D. and Holland, W. N., 1974. Cultural sites and their environment in the Blue Mountains. Archaeology and Physical Anthropology in Oceania. Vol. 9 (1), pp.36–65.
- Stockton, E. D., 1979. The search for the first Sydneysiders. In: Stanbury, P. (Ed.), 10,000 Years of Sydney Life. A Guide to Archaeological Discovery, pp 49–54. The Macleay Museum, The University of Sydney, Sydney.
- Stockton, Eugene, 1982. Arabian Cult Stones. Department of Semitic Studies, University of Sydney, PhD Thesis.
- Nanson, G. C., Young, R. A. W. and Stockton, E. D. 1987. Chronology and Palaeoenvironment of the Cranebrook Terrace (near Sydney) containing artefacts more than 40,000 years old. Archaeology in Oceania 22: 72-8.
- Stockton, Eugene, 1990. Landmarks : A Spiritual Search in a Southern Land. Parish Ministry Publications, Eastwood (Revised ed. 2013 BMERT, Lawson) ISBN 978-0-646-91021-5
- Stockton, E. D., 1995, The Aboriginal Gift : Spirituality for a Nation. Millenium Books, Alexandria ( 2nd Edition 2015 BMERT, Lawson)
- Stockton, Eugene, 1998. Wonder : A Way to God. St Pauls Publications, Strathfield. ( Revised ed. 2018. Blue Mountain Education and Research Trust) ISBN 978-0-9941555-7-3
- Stockton, E. D. and Merriman, J. (Eds.), 2009. Blue Mountains Dreaming: The Aboriginal Heritage. (Second Edition). Blue Mountain Education and Research Trust, Lawson. 255 pp. ISBN 978-0-646-50386-8
- Stockton, Eugene and O'Donnell, Terence 2010. Aboriginal Church Paintings : Reflecting on our Faith. Blue Mountain Education and Research Trust, Lawson.
- Stockton, Eugene, 2011. The Deep Within : Towards an Archetypal Theology. Blue Mountain Education and Research Trust, Lawson. ISBN 978-0-646-56079-3
- Stockton, Eugene. (Editor), 2013. Sydney Rock – On the Ways to the West. Blue Mountain Education and Research Trust, Lawson. ISBN 978-0-646-90536-5
- Stockton, Eugene. (Editor), 2014. This Tortuous Ridge – Linden to Lawson. Blue Mountain Education and Research Trust, Lawson. ISBN 978-0-9941555-1-1
- Stockton, Eugene, 2018. Martha and Mary of my Mind: Studies into Deep Consciousness. Blue Mountain Education and Research Trust, Lawson. ISBN 978-0-994-1555-6-6.
- Knox, Kelvin and Stockton, Eugene (Eds.) 2019. Aboriginal Heritage of the Blue Mountains : Recent Research and Reflections. Blue Mountain Education and Research Trust, Lawson. ISBN 978-0-9941555-8-0
- Emilsen, William W. and Stockton, Eugene (Eds.) 2021. Sacred Ways and Places in the Blue Mountains. Blue Mountain Education and Research Trust, Lawson. ISBN 978-0-645098-0-3
- Emilsen, William W. and Stockton, Eugene (Eds.) 2022. The Wisdom of Age - Reflections on Growing Old in the Blue Mountains. Blue Mountain Education and Research Trust, Lawson. ISBN 978-0-6450983-1-0
- Stockton, Eugene, 2025. An Archeological Tour of the Blue Mountains. Blue Mountain Education and Research Trust, Lawson. ISBN 978-0-6450983-4-1
