= Bettany's Book =

2000 novel by Australian author Thomas Keneally

- Author: Thomas Keneally
- Language: English
- Genre: Novel
- Publisher: Doubleday
- Publication date: 2000
- Publication place: Australia
- Media type: Print
- Pages: 598 pp.
- ISBN: 1864710004
- Preceded by: A River Town
- Followed by: An Angel in Australia

Bettany's Book is a 2000 novel by the Australian author Thomas Keneally.

== Synopsis ==
Prim and Dimp Bettany are sisters whose parents were killed in a car accident. Dimp becomes rather famous as a filmmaker while Prim escapes Australia for Sudan to work for Austfam, as an aid worker. The sisters are drawn back together when Dimp is given a copy of an ancestor's journal of 19th-century frontier Tasmania.

== Critical reception ==
Writing in The Daily Mail (UK) reviewer Elizabeth Buchan noted: "Rich, measured and reflective, Bettany's Book requires time and concentration - but it is worth it."

A critic in The Guardian commented: "The first thing to be said about Thomas Keneally's new novel, Bettany's Book - indeed, the first thing to be said about almost any Keneally novel - is that it is very long. Keneally can always be depended upon: wherever and whenever they are set, his books are reassuringly thick and dense. There is nothing dilletantish, frittering or minor about them."

== Publishing history ==
After the novel's initial publication in Australia, UK and USA by Doubleday in 2000, it was reprinted as follows:

- Sceptre, UK, 2000 and 2001
- Doubleday, Australia, 2002

== See also ==
- 2000 in Australian literature

== Notes ==
- Dedication: To Rory Coverdale, fresh to Australia and the world.
- The author was interviewed by Dina Rabinovitch of The Independent (UK) about the novel.
