= Paul Crittenden (academic) =

Australian philosopher

- Born: Australia

Education
- Education: Catholic Institute of Sydney, Yale Divinity School, Balliol College, Oxford

Philosophical work
- Era: 20th-century philosophy, 21st-century philosophy
- Region: Western philosophy
- School: Continental philosophy, Analytic philosophy
- Institutions: University of Canterbury, University of Sydney
- Main interests: Ethics, Moral development, Greek philosophy, Sartrean ethics
- Notable works: Learning to be Moral (1990); Sartre in Search of an Ethics (2009); Reason, Will and Emotion (2012); Life Hereafter (2021)

Paul Crittenden is an Australian philosopher and academic known for his work in ethics, Greek philosophy, and European philosophy from Nietzsche to Sartre. He is a former professor of philosophy at the University of Sydney and was appointed emeritus Professor following his retirement in 2001.

== Education ==
Crittenden studied philosophy and theology at the Catholic Institute of Sydney (CIS), where he completed a doctorate in 1962 with a thesis entitled The Concept of Virtue from Socrates to Thomas Aquinas. He held a postdoctoral fellowship at Yale Divinity School (1964–65), and later earned a B.Litt. from Balliol College, Oxford (1965–68) with a thesis entitled Intentional Action and Causes.

== Academic career ==
He was ordained a Catholic priest in 1959 and served concurrently with his academic work until resigning in 1983. His first full-time appointment was at the University of Canterbury, New Zealand (1971–76). In 1978, he joined the University of Sydney as a lecturer, advancing to Senior Lecturer (1983), Associate Professor (1990), and Professor (1991).

Crittenden served as Dean of the Faculty of Arts from 1990 to 1996. During his tenure, he worked to support collaboration across departments, including the Philosophy programs.

== Philosophical approach and public engagement ==
Engaging with both analytic and continental traditions, Crittenden's work examines historical philosophical developments and their modern relevance. He edited the journal Critical Philosophy (1984–88).

His book *Sartre in Search of an Ethics* was reviewed in Sophia by Steven Churchill (2010), who refers to him as "Emeritus Professor Paul Crittenden (University of Sydney)" and discusses his exploration of Sartre's ethical development.

He further contributes to clinical ethics as a former member of the Sydney Local Health Medical Ethics Review Committee at Royal Prince Alfred Hospital (1990–99). In retirement, he continues to publish extensively and referees for journals such as Sophia.

== Selected works ==
=== Books ===
- Learning to be Moral: Philosophical Thoughts about Moral Development (Humanities Press, 1990).
- Changing Orders: Scenes of Clerical and Academic Life (Brandl & Schlesinger, 2008).
- Sartre in Search of an Ethics (Cambridge Scholars Publishing, 2009).
- Reason, Will and Emotion: Defending the Greek Tradition against Triune Consciousness (Palgrave Macmillan, 2012).
- Life Hereafter: The Rise and Decline of a Tradition (Palgrave Macmillan, 2021).
- (ed. with John Grumley & Pauline Johnson) Culture and Enlightenment: Essays for György Markus (Ashgate, 2002).
