= Towards Asmara =

1989 novel by Australian author Thomas Keneally

- Author: Thomas Keneally
- Language: English
- Genre: Novel
- Publisher: Hodder and Stoughton
- Publication date: 1989
- Publication place: Australia
- Media type: Print
- Pages: 272 pp.
- ISBN: 9780340415177
- Preceded by: By the Line
- Followed by: Flying Hero Class

Towards Asmara (1989) is a novel by Australian writer Thomas Keneally. It was originally published by Hodder and Stoughton in Australia and the United Kingdom in 1989. The novel is also known by the alternative title To Asmara.

== Synopsis ==
The novel follows a group of travellers in Eritrea. One of their number, Darcy, an Australian journalist and lawyer, is attempting to prove that the Ethiopians are using international food aid relief as a cover for their gun-running.

== Publishing history ==
After its initial publication in Australia and the UK by Hodder and Stoughton in 1989, the novel was reprinted as follows:

- Warners Books, USA, 1989 (with alt title)
- Lester and Orpen Dennys, Canada, 1989 (with alt title)
- Sceptre, UK, 1990 and 2002

== Dedication ==
- "To my family who allowed me for a time to travel with the compassionate Eritrean Relief Association, and the brave Eritrean People's Liberation Front."

== Critical reception ==
Writing in The Canberra Times reviewer Mark Thomas noted: "Over the years Keneally has specialised in earnestly exhuming worthy subjects, ranging from Jimmie Blacksmith to Confederate soldiers to Joan of Arc to (most successfully) Schindler and his ark. With Towards Asmara, he has perfected the technique, in insisting that we (like him) make room for the Eritrean cause in our consciences...The novel is accordingly clogged with factual detail and cluttered with background information, all designed to make the Eritreans a bit more familiar and congenial to us...But, as with Schlinder's Ark, the reader may be left wondering precisely what he is being asked to read. The characters carry a heavy burden of philosophical and political baggage. The plot is thin and slow, focussed on a few foreigners' desultory traipsing around Eritrea in search of an errant father, a requited love, a rebel ambush and a little something to believe in."

== See also ==
- God or Politics : Tom Keneally in Eritrea (1990), a documentary made retracing Keneally's journey into Eritrea as research for this novel
- 1989 in Australian literature
