= Moses the Lawgiver =

- UK DVD cover
- Genre: Biblical; Biography; Drama; History
- Written by: Vittorio Bonicelli; Anthony Burgess; Gianfranco De Bosio; Bernardino Zapponi
- Directed by: Gianfranco De Bosio
- Starring: Burt Lancaster; Anthony Quayle; Ingrid Thulin; Irene Papas
- Theme music composer: Ennio Morricone
- Countries of origin: Italy; United Kingdom
- Original language: English
- No. of episodes: 6

Production
- Producers: Lew Grade; Bernard J. Kingham; Vincenzo Labella
- Cinematography: Marcello Gatti
- Editors: Peter Boita; Mario Bava; Alberto Gallitti
- Running time: 360 minutes
- Production companies: ITC Entertainment; RAI
- Budget: $5 million

Original release
- Network: Rai 1 (Italy); ITV (United Kingdom); CBS (United States)
- Release: 21 June – 2 August 1975

Moses the Lawgiver is a six-hour television miniseries filmed in 1973/74 and starring Burt Lancaster as Moses. It was an ITC/RAI co-production filmed in Rome and on location in Israel and Morocco.

Many of the writers, cast and crew contributed to another ITC/RAI Biblical co-production, the ambitious miniseries Jesus of Nazareth, released in 1977.

== Plot summary ==
The Story of the Exodus or freedom of Hebrews from Egypt is told in a perspective which highlights Moses' efforts to persuade first the stubborn Pharaoh Merneptah, who was his adopted cousin, to release his work force of slaves. Then, once free and in the wilderness en route to the Promised Land, Moses must prove to be a pious and patient leader or lawgiver to a people who still think they want more out of him or God. For 40 years, Moses (Burt Lancaster) must carry on this load and challenge for God and Israel.

With the help of his brother Aaron (Anthony Quayle), and Joshua (Aharon Ipale), the nation or people of Israel are officially born or created after centuries ago God promised and vowed Jacob/Israel that he would be the father of a mighty nation.

== Cast ==
- Burt Lancaster as Moses
- Anthony Quayle as Aaron
- Ingrid Thulin as Miriam
- Irene Papas as Zipporah
- Aharon Ipale as Joshua
- Yosef Shiloach as Dathan
- Marina Berti as Eliseba
- Shmuel Rodensky as Jethro
- Mariangela Melato as The Princess Bithiah
- Laurent Terzieff as Pharaoh Merneptah
- Michele Placido as Caleb
- Antonio Piovanelli as Korah
- Jacques Herlin as The Magician
- Umberto Raho and José Quaglio as two of The Pharaoh's Ministers
- Melba Englander as Merneptah's Wife
- Marco Steiner as The Young Merneptah
- William Lancaster as The Young Moses
- Galia Kohn as The Young Miriam
- Mosko Alkalai as Amram
- Dina Doron as Jochebed
- Yossi Werzansky as Eleazar
- Richard Johnson as The Narrator

== Production ==
As Charlton Heston's son Fraser acted out the infant Moses in the 1956 Hollywood production of The Ten Commandments, so Burt Lancaster's son Bill, credited as William Lancaster, acted out the role of Moses as a young man in Moses the Lawgiver.

The Italian government suggested to the series' producer, Lew Grade, that he should meet Pope Paul VI, and subsequently did so at his wife's insistence. Grade and his wife Kathie had a private audience with Paul who told them of his pleasure at the film and offered his endorsement to be used for publicity purposes. Paul suggested to Grade that his next film should be called 'In the footsteps of Jesus'; the Pope's suggestion developed into the miniseries Jesus of Nazareth.

== Soundtrack ==
The "Moses Theme" was composed by Ennio Morricone; the original music was performed by Gianna Spagnulo and Coro e Orchestra dell'Unione Musicisti Romani.

== Novelization ==
In 1975, a tie-in book, written by Australian author Thomas Keneally, was published by Harper & Row.

== Broadcast and home media ==
CBS committed to airing the series in America as it went into production. The six episodes aired on Saturday nights at 10pm from 21 June to 2 August 1975. In the summer of 1978, the show was rerun on Sunday nights at 10pm.

The six-hour miniseries was later edited into a 141-minute theatrical release version under the title Moses.

In 2004, the edited version was released as a one-disc DVD. A 300-minute version (two-disc set) was released in 2012 for Latin America (but not dubbed into Spanish and compatible in both Regions 1 & 4); it was packaged (somewhat deceptively) as Moises y los 10 Mandamientos-Extended Version. The same original version was released on region 1 DVD by S'More Entertainment in the US on May 14, 2019.
