= Bear Cottage =

Australian children's hospice

Coordinates: 33.80375526771629°S 151.29227984448983°E

Bear Cottage is a children’s hospice located in Manly, Australia and is part of the Sydney Children's Hospitals Network. It provides long-term care to children, including nursing care, music, play and art therapy, and food, cleaning, and counseling services. Bear Cottage is designed to be like a home away from home and as far removed from a hospital environment as possible. Staff do not wear uniforms, and no medical procedures are carried out in the bedrooms, which are designed to be like a normal bedroom.

== History ==
Bear Cottage was conceived in the 1990s by Dr John Yu and Dr Michael Stevens from The Children's Hospital at Westmead to enhance the hospital's palliative care program and proposed to be developed on part of the site of the former St Patrick's Seminary estate on North Head above Manly.

It opened on St Patrick's Day 17 March 2001 after $10 million had been raised from the community to build it.

The hospice saw a huge increase in growth from 2008.

In 2017 its operational costs were approximately $3.7 million per year, with funding coming from the government, clubs and private sector. It is one of only three children’s hospices in Australia.

Since 2016 the Cottage has been managed by Narelle Martin. Professor Les White is the Patron.

== A community icon ==
In 2021 radio announcer Ben Fordham publicly thanked Bear Cottage for their care for sick children.

In 2020 Sydney coffee roasters Seven Miles launched a new coffee blend, Bear and the Beard, donating proceeds of sales to the hospice.

In 2014 the Duke and Duchess of Cambridge visited, where the Duchess (who is patron of UK children’s hospice, the East Anglia Children’s Hospice) made a speech. They were reportedly brought to the verge of tears by the plight of a nine-month old baby who had only days to live following a six-week battle with bacterial meningitis.

In 2005 competitors in the City to Surf running race raised funds for the cottage.
