= Jacko (novel) =

1993 novel by Australian author Thomas Keneally

- Author: Thomas Keneally
- Language: English
- Genre: Novel
- Publisher: Heinemann
- Publication date: 1993
- Publication place: Australia
- Media type: Print
- Pages: 316 pp.
- ISBN: 085561529X
- Preceded by: Woman of the Inner Sea
- Followed by: A River Town

Jacko is a 1993 novel by the Australian author Thomas Keneally.

The novel is also known by the title Jacko: The Great Intruder.

== Synopsis ==
The novel follows the life of Jacko Emptor, born into a cattle family from the Northern Territory. He is sent off to boarding school in Sydney where he is captivated by television and decides to seek a career in the medium. He travels to New York where he is employed as a journalist by an Australian media giant who has recently bought a US television network.

== Critical reception ==
Writing in The Canberra Times reviewer Sheila Parsonson noted: "..Keneally divides his time between Australia and America, and his entertaining observations of both cultures are reflected throughout Jacko, the story of an Australian boy from the bush who makes good in New York...Keneally mixes truth with fiction so smoothly that anything seems possible, and even the most unlikely stories are credible. In Jacko, the television journalist hero uncovers sordid stories that reflect the moral decay of America, and Keneally takes the opportunity to air his theories of America and Australia, particularly with regard to the role of television."

== Publishing history ==
After the novel's initial publication in Australia by Heinemann in 1993, it was reprinted as follows:

- Mandarin, Australia, 1994
- Hodder and Stoughton, UK, 1994 (with alternate title)
- Sceptre, UK, 1995

The novel was also translated into Hungarian in 1997.

== See also ==
- 1993 in Australian literature
