= Woman of the Inner Sea =

1992 novel by Australian author Thomas Keneally

- Author: Thomas Keneally
- Language: English
- Genre: Novel
- Publisher: Hodder and Stoughton
- Publication date: 1992
- Publication place: Australia
- Media type: Print
- Pages: 284 pp.
- ISBN: 0340531487
- Preceded by: Chief of Staff
- Followed by: Jacko

Woman of the Inner Sea is a 1992 novel by the Australian author Thomas Keneally.

== Synopsis ==
After a tragedy Kate Gaffney-Kozinsky gives up her marriage, family and life in Sydney for the Outback where she hopes to transform herself.

== Critical reception ==
Writing in The Canberra Times reviewer Mark Thomas stated: "Woman of the Inner Sea is a touching story, cleverly told. I actively disliked Keneally's last two limp and lame novels, Towards Asmara and Flying Hero Class. This is a story with more emotional strength, more intellectual panache, more stylistic charm...Woman of the Inner Sea is a well structured, tightly knit narrative. Keneally organises his climax as early as page 72, but studiously refuses to let us in on his secret for more than a hundred pages."

== Publishing history ==
After the novel's initial publication in Australia and UK by Hodder and Stoughton in 1992, it was reprinted as follows:

- Coronet, Australia, 1993
- Talese, USA, 1993
- Sceptre, UK, 1993
- Plume, USA, 1993
- Doubleday, USA, 1993

The novel was also translated into Italian, Spanish and Polish in 1994, and Turkish, French and Chinese in 1996.

== See also ==
- 1992 in Australian literature
