= Act of Grace =

1988 novel by Australian writer Thomas Keneally

- Author: Thomas Keneally
- Language: English
- Genre: Fiction
- Publisher: Chatto and Windus
- Publication date: 1988
- Publication place: Australia
- Media type: Print
- Pages: 306 pp.
- Preceded by: The Playmaker
- Followed by: By the Line

Act of Grace (1988) is a novel by Australian writer Thomas Keneally, published under the pseudonym "William Coyle". It was originally published by Chatto and Windus in the UK in 1988. It is also known by the title Firestorm.

== Synopsis ==
The novel follows two stories: the first concerns an Australian tail-gunner flying in a Lancaster bomber over Germany during World War II; the second features his sister who is in a convent and who is troubled by an overly attentive priest.

== Critical reception ==
Writing in The Canberra Times reviewer Mark Thomas noted that the novel was "worthy" but ended with the statement: "The parallel stories are neatly woven, the scenes are adeptly sketched, but the book never gains momentum or drama."

== Publication history ==
After its original publication in 1988 in the UK by publisher Chatto and Windus the novel was later published by William Morrow, in USA, in 1989 under the title Firestorm. Several paperback editions followed.

== See also ==
- 1988 in Australian literature
