= Flying Hero Class =

1991 novel by Australian author Thomas Keneally

- Author: Thomas Keneally
- Language: English
- Genre: Novel
- Publisher: Hodder and Stoughton
- Publication date: 1991
- Publication place: Australia
- Media type: Print
- Pages: 224 pp.
- ISBN: 0340531479
- Preceded by: Towards Asmara
- Followed by: Chief of Staff

Flying Hero Class is a 1991 thriller novel by the Australian author Thomas Keneally.

== Synopsis ==
On a flight between New York and Frankfurt Australian Aboriginal dance troupe, the Barrarnatjara, find themselves hostages after their plane is hijacked by a group of Palestinians.

== Critical reception ==
Mark Thomas, writing in The Canberra Times noted: "Flying Hero Class is meant to combine a political thriller with a morality play. The components of the thriller are obvious enough, especially if you have ever worried about being blown out into the atmosphere at 30,000 feet...The morality play reflects Keneally's interest in the proposition that Aborigines might prove sympathetic to Palestinians complaining about their loss of a homeland. Keneally's halves are not equally balanced. The thriller bits limp and creak; the novel is too much talk and too little action...But this novel has quieter charms. Keneally is a keen, kind observer of life, and his characters (including the bit parts) are cleverly drawn."

== Publishing history ==
After the novel's initial publication in UK by Hodder and Stoughton in 1991, it was reprinted as follows:

- Warner Books, USA, 1991
- Sceptre, UK, 1991
- Coronet, Australia, 1992

== See also ==
- Tom Keneally was interviewed about the novel by Robert Hefner for The Canberra Times
- 1991 in Australian literature
