= Season in Purgatory =

Book by Thomas Keneally

- Author: Thomas Keneally
- Language: English
- Genre: Literary fiction
- Publisher: Collins, London
- Publication date: 1976
- Publication place: Australia
- Media type: Print
- Pages: 223 pp
- ISBN: 0002224712
- Preceded by: Gossip from the Forest
- Followed by: A Victim of the Aurora

Season in Purgatory (1976) is a novel by Australian author Thomas Keneally.

== Plot outline ==
The novel is set during the Second World War on the island of Mus, which lies in the Adriatic Sea. David Pelham is a junior medical officer in the British Army who volunteers for battlefield medical work and is parachuted onto the island along with a number of British officers and servicemen. Their aim is to aid Tito's partisans in fighting the occupying Germans.

== Reception ==
Clement Semmler gave a warning to his readers regarding the novel's depictions of surgical operations and finished: "Despite its strong stuff, the novel is, as I have said, immensely readable, more so I believe than any other Thomas Keneally has written to date."

Reviewing the novel in The Canberra Times Sandy Murray noted: "Thomas Keneally possesses in rare degree the capacity of conveying with startling reality the most intimate activities of the varied characters in his novels. His pathos is quickly shared with the reader." And concluded: "Thomas Keneally has not dodged the factual crudities of a war situation which bears the stamp of truth. His rugged realities serve to set war in the context of waste and madness where the untamed tantrums of human nature enjoy full play."

== See also ==
- 1976 in Australian literature

== Notes ==
- Dedication: To my brother John Patrick
- Author's note: This mere narrative derives from real events that occurred off the Dalmatian coast in 1943 and 1944. However, the characters - with the exception of Tito himself - are entirely fictional and are not meant to refer, either as regards appearance, behaviour or career, to any officer, doctor or partisan who occupied that place and period.
