= Three Cheers for the Paraclete =

Novel by Thomas Keneally

- First edition
- Author: Thomas Keneally
- Language: English
- Publisher: Angus and Robertson, Australia
- Publication date: 1968
- Publication place: Australia
- Media type: Print (Hardback & Paperback)
- Pages: 240 pp
- ISBN: 0-207-95046-6
- OCLC: 40233
- Dewey Decimal: 823
- LC Class: PZ4.K336 Th PR9619.3.K46
- Preceded by: Bring Larks and Heroes
- Followed by: The Survivor

Three Cheers for the Paraclete (1968) is a novel by the Australian author Thomas Keneally, based on his time as a seminarian at St Patrick's Seminary, Manly. It won the Miles Franklin Award in 1968.

== Story outline ==
"'Set in a Roman Catholic diocese,...Three Cheers for the Paraclete is about the dilemma of the rebel who knows that established authority is wrong but doesn't know how to put it right because he is himself too much a part of it. It is also about a critical religious issue...the conflict between a new generation which sees religious truth as something that must change with the world, and an establishment which sees it as fixed and immutable.

"In the character of young Father Maitland, scholar and humanitarian, many readers will recognize a lost hero of our time. Others, perhaps, will see only an arrogant intellectual, and something of a heretic. But almost everyone will identify with one side or the other of the conflict into which Father Maitland's beliefs and sympathies draw him - a conflict with his superiors which threatens to destroy him both as a priest and as a man."

== Critical reception ==
In The Canberra Times, John Molony is impressed with the book but finds a number of problems with it: "The heart of the novel is about belief, but for this reviewer the transplant didn't work. It is hard to say about a Keneally that his theme was too big for him and that he couldn't incarnate his problem in living characters. Yet in this instance they do not measure up."

Kirkus Reviews found something more in the book: 'Keneally's rather existential points are made with delicacy, at times with a warm, broad humor, and Father James is a vigorous, attractive priest. A thoughtful and sentient book."

== Awards and nominations ==
- Miles Franklin Literary Award, 1968: winner
- C. Weichhardt Award for Australian Literature, 1969: winner
