= Passenger (Keneally novel) =

Novel by Australian writer Tom Keneally

- Author: Thomas Keneally
- Language: English
- Genre: Fiction
- Publisher: Collins, Australia
- Publication date: 1979
- Publication place: Australia
- Media type: Print
- Pages: 186 pp
- ISBN: 0002216299
- Preceded by: A Victim of the Aurora
- Followed by: Confederates

Passenger (1979) is a novel by Australian writer Thomas Keneally.

== Abstract ==
The narrator of this novel is a foetus in utero, who watches the outside world through his mother's eyes. He observes the break-up of his parents' marriage, his mother's incarceration in a mental hospital, and her eventual escape and travel to Australia, where he is born.

== Dedication ==
"To Trish Sheppard and Iain Findlay".

== Critical reception ==
In the Canberra Times Hope Hewitt was a little annoyed with the main character: "In practice it provides a novel excuse for the oldest of narrative conventions: the omniscient narrator. It also provides for a variation on the Romantic notion of the wise child; and I confess that there were moments when the little man became so polysyllabically philosophical or his creator so cutely whimsical that I found myself wishing the brat would remain unborn...But apart from a few irritations with the conventions of the fantasy, Passenger is an entertaining book, with its constant changes of scene and its unexpected uses of language."

== Publication history ==
After its original publication in 1979 by Collins, the novel was published as follows:

- Harcourt Brace Jovanovich, USA, 1978
- Fontana, UK, 1980

== See also ==
- 1979 in Australian literature
