= Sydney Children's Hospital =

Sydney Children's Hospital, Randwick
- Sydney Children's Hospitals Network

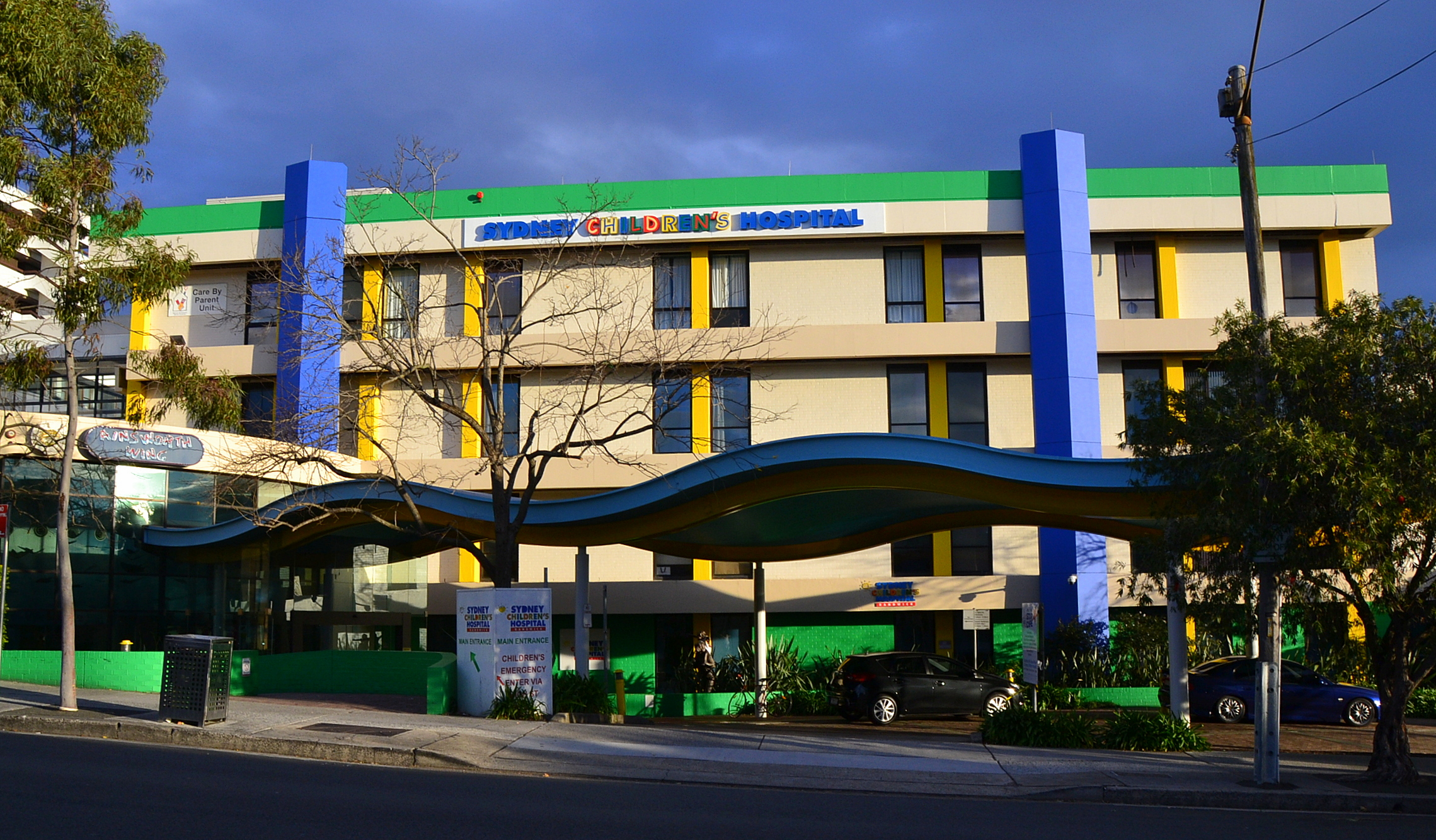
- Sydney Children's Hospital, Randwick

Geography
- Location: High St, Randwick, New South Wales, Australia
- Coordinates: 33.9185°S 151.2387°E

Organisation
- Care system: Medicare (Australia)
- Type: Specialist; Teaching
- Affiliated university: University of New South Wales
- Network: NSW Health

Services
- Emergency department: Yes; Pediatric Major Trauma Centre
- Beds: 340

Helipads
- Helipad: (ICAO: YXSN)
Number	Length		Surface
Number	ft	m	Surface
1			concrete
2			concrete

History
- Founded: 1852

Links
- Website: www.schn.health.nsw.gov.au

Sydney Children's Hospital, Randwick, is an Australian children's hospital located in the eastern suburbs of Sydney, New South Wales.

On 1 July 2010 it became part of the newly formed Sydney Children's Hospitals Network (Randwick and Westmead) incorporating The Children’s Hospital at Westmead and the children's hospice Bear Cottage.

The Sydney Children's Hospital, Randwick, is located approximately 6 kilometres from the Sydney Central Business District in the suburb of Randwick. Sydney Children's Hospital, Randwick, is also a major teaching hospital and is a teaching facility for the University of New South Wales. The Sydney Children's Hospital shares the Randwick Hospitals' Campus site with the Prince of Wales Hospital and the Royal Hospital for Women, as well as the Prince of Wales Private Hospital.

== History ==
The Sydney Children's Hospital, Randwick, had its origins in 1852 with the formation of the Society for Destitute Children, which established the Asylum for Destitute Children with the first building opened on 21 March 1858 in Paddington. After an appeal for funds in 1870, the Catherine Hayes Hospital opened. The hospital's primary intention was to care for children that suffered from illness, poverty and famine.

As the hospital grew the children's hospital became a wing of the larger general hospital. In 1915, during the First World War the hospital was converted by the NSW Government into a military hospital and then a repatriation hospital, and renamed the Fourth Australian Repatriation Hospital. In 1927, an association between the Coast Hospital and the Fourth Australian Repatriation Hospital at Randwick began. With the opening of the Concord Repatriation General Hospital in 1953, the hospital was renamed the Prince of Wales Hospital, with the attached children's hospital becoming known as the Prince of Wales Children's Hospital.

In 1964, the Prince of Wales Children's Hospital was founded as an independent hospital by Professor John Beveridge, who had the goal of creating a second Sydney children's hospital dedicated to caring for children. That same year the hospital became the teaching hospital for the University of New South Wales. In 1994 the hospital underwent a $46.5 million (AUD) redevelopment, greatly increasing the capabilities of the hospital.

On 12 June 1998, the Prince of Wales Children's Hospital officially became known as the Sydney Children's Hospital, Randwick, when the then Premier of New South Wales, Bob Carr, and Health Minister, Andrew Refshauge, officially opened the hospital. In 2003, the hospital opened a community child health facility on the Randwick campus that provides services for children with developmental disabilities, mental health disorders and other behavioural issues. In 2010, the hospital was transferred from the administration of the South-East Sydney Illawarra Area Health Service to the newly formed 'Sydney Children's Hospitals Network (Randwick and Westmead) incorporating The Children’s Hospital at Westmead'.

== Telethon ==
The Gold Week Telethon is an annual telethon established in 2010 with proceeds benefiting the Sydney Children's Hospital, Randwick.

== See also ==
- List of hospitals in Australia
