= Confederates (novel) =

Novel by Thomas Keneally

- First edition cover
- Author: Thomas Keneally
- Language: English
- Publisher: Collins, England and Australia
- Publication date: 1979
- Publication place: Australia
- Media type: Print (Hardback & Paperback)
- Pages: 427 pp
- ISBN: 0-00-222141-1
- OCLC: 6090459
- Dewey Decimal: 823
- LC Class: PZ4.K336 Co 1979 PR9619.3.K46
- Preceded by: Passenger
- Followed by: The Cut-Rate Kingdom

Confederates is a 1979 novel by the Australian author Thomas Keneally which uses the American Civil War as its main subject matter.

== Synopsis ==
Confederates uses the United States Civil War as a setting for a more personal conflict between neighbors. In the midst of the war's climactic battle—Antietam—another conflict is underway. Ephie Bumpass' husband Usaph and Ephie's lover Decatur Cate are thrown together to fight in the Shenandoah Volunteers. Cate's emasculating injury in the battle is a symbolic punishment for his sin.

== Publishing history ==
After the novel's initial publication by Collins in the UK and Australia in 1979, it was republished by Harper & Row in USA in 1980, and later in various paperback editions.

== Critical reception ==
Writing in The Canberra Times Mark Thomas noted: "Confederates evinces Keneally's fascination with the mechanics of fighting. He examines rigorously how a battle works, what shapes a coward, how one man can shoot another...One of Keneally's problems may be uncertainty at the kind of story he is telling. Confederates is not only set in Victorian era but often reads like a Victorian novel, replete with implausible coincidences, an extensive gallery of stock figures and characterised by inordinate length and a self-indulgent author."

A reviewer in Kirkus Reviews called it "Keneally's best novel yet, ripest fruit of an imagination that has been grinding for years in an effort to energize history within its fiction—sometimes head-on, sometimes obliquely, but never with quite full success." They concluded that the novel was "A grave and breathtaking book, a model historical novel by a writer growing ever better."

== Awards and nominations ==
- Booker Prize: shortlisted 1979

== See also ==
- "The Sites of War in the Fiction of Thomas Keneally" by Peter Pierce, Australian Literary Studies vol.12 no.4 October 1986 (pp. 442–452)
- 1979 in Australian literature
