= A Family Madness =

1985 novel by Australian writer Thomas Keneally

- Author: Thomas Keneally
- Language: English
- Genre: Fiction
- Publisher: Hodder and Stoughton
- Publication date: 1985
- Publication place: Australia
- Media type: Print
- Pages: 315 pp.
- ISBN: 0340384492
- Preceded by: Schindler's Ark
- Followed by: The Playmaker

A Family Madness (1985) is a novel by Australian writer Thomas Keneally. It was originally published by Hodder and Stoughton in Australia in 1985.

== Synopsis ==
After Terry Delaney, a professional rugby league player, meets Rudi Kabbel, he starts a relationship with Kabbel's daughter Danielle. Kabbel is deeply scarred by his family's involvement in Europe in World War II which results in a tragic end for him and his family.

== Critical reception ==
Writing in The Australian Book Review Ludmilla Forsyth noted: "Thomas Keneally’s A Family Madness attempts to get the reader in touch with life beyond the headline and the common enough family madness which irrupts the security we call home, sweet home. While each family may be unhappy in its own way, only some hit the screen or the front page, splattering their sorrow onto family breakfasts, lunches, dinners...There is much in this novel that is admirable – Keneally’s moral intent, his compassion, his close study of human nature. There is also much which is troublesome – the structure, the perspectives, the presentation of history as fiction."

Publishers Weekly stated: "Keneally brilliantly combines three diverse narrative techniques, and while the book is not light or easy reading, it is enormously rewarding."

== Publication history ==
After its original publication in 1985 in the Australia by publishers Hodder and Stoughton the novel was later published as follows:

- Guild Press, UK, 1985
- Simon and Schuster, USA, 1986

and other paperback editions.

The novel was translated into Dutch in 1987, and Polish in 1996.

== Dedication ==
- "Dedication: For Judith, who bore the weight of this book."

== See also ==
- 1985 in Australian literature
