= The Daughters of Mars =

Novel by Thomas Keneally

- Author: Tom Keneally
- Language: English
- Publisher: Vintage, Australia
- Publication date: 2012
- Publication place: Australia
- Media type: Print (Paperback)
- Pages: 592
- ISBN: 9781864712254
- Preceded by: The People's Train
- Followed by: Shame and the Captives

The Daughters of Mars is a 2012 novel by Australian novelist Tom Keneally.

== Plot summary ==
Sally and Naomi Durance are two nurses from country New South Wales who are shipped to Egypt during World War I end up on the Red Cross hospital ship Archimedes, stationed in the Dardanelles. The novel follows the sisters through that campaign and on to northern Europe.

== Notes ==
- Dedication:

To the two nurses,
Judith and Jane

== Reviews ==
In The Guardian Jay Parini notes that "Keneally revisits the first world war from the perspective of two sisters, nurses who see the blood and guts of this conflict from the periphery, on hospital ships and operating theatres...Of course there are love stories, rather inevitable and not especially interesting or memorable. And not quite knowing how to conclude the novel, Keneally offers a peculiar, bifurcated ending that doesn't work. But in truth this doesn't matter. This is a novel on an epic scale: its plenitude and anguish are life-enhancing, and the huge talents of Thomas Keneally are everywhere on display."

Alan Riding in The New York Times found that "The Daughters of Mars is a long book, with ample room for multiple characters and numerous subplots, not a few involving love affairs between our circle of nurses and assorted doctors, orderlies and soldiers. But by the spring of 1916 it’s the carnage on the Western Front that consumes everyone’s attention." But concludes that Keneally "has rescued forgotten heroines from obscurity and briefly placed them center stage."

== Awards and nominations ==
- 2012 winner Colin Roderick Award
- 2013 longlisted Miles Franklin Literary Award
- 2013 shortlisted New South Wales Premier's Literary Awards — Christina Stead Prize for Fiction
- 2013 shortlisted Australian Book Industry Awards (ABIA) — Australian Literary Fiction Book of the Year
- 2014 longlisted International Dublin Literary Award
