= The Place at Whitton =

Book by Thomas Keneally

- First edition
- Author: Thomas Keneally
- Language: English
- Genre: Fiction
- Publisher: Cassell, London
- Publication date: 1964
- Publication place: Australia
- Media type: Print
- Pages: 219pp
- Preceded by: –
- Followed by: The Fear

The Place at Whitton (1964) is the first novel by Australian writer Thomas Keneally.

== Story outline ==
The novel is set in a large seminary (based on St Patrick's Seminary, Manly) where, in eight weeks' time, 200 young men are to be ordained as Catholic priests. Then preparations are interrupted by the murders of one of the lay labourers and the scholarly rector.

== Critical reception ==
A reviewer in Kirkus Reviews didn't find much of interest in the book: "The contrast provided by the presence of a Roman Catholic monastery allows the author a latitude in analytic comment he able to seize, but the hackneyed formula reduces his points to pretensions."

In 2014 Knopf re-issued the novel to commemorate its fiftieth anniversary. Peter Pierce reviewed the release for The Sydney Morning Herald and noted: "In The Place at Whitton can also be discerned two enduring features of Keneally’s art. One is his use of melodrama – exaggerated language and gesture, the master theme of dispossession, whether of life, property, chastity, reputation. The other is the generous fault, cum structural problem, of trying to accommodate within one book several others that might have been...The beginning of his career as a novelist had awkward moments, but not tentative ones, as a prodigious imagination first exerted itself and the first of many stories was told."

== See also ==
- 1964 in Australian literature
