= The People's Train =

Novel by Thomas Keneally

- First edition
- Author: Tom Keneally
- Language: English
- Publisher: Vintage, Australia
- Publication date: 2009
- Publication place: Australia
- Media type: Print (Paperback)
- Pages: 408
- ISBN: 9781741667431
- Preceded by: The Widow and Her Hero
- Followed by: The Daughters of Mars

The People's Train is a 2009 novel by Australian novelist Tom Keneally.

== Plot summary ==
The novel is a fictionalised account of the Australian life of Fyodor Sergeyev, given in the book as Artem Samsurov, a Russian émigré to Australia who would later play a significant role in Lenin's government.

== Reviews ==
- The Guardian
- The Telegraph

== Awards and nominations ==
- 2010 shortlisted Commonwealth Writers' Prize South East Asia and South Pacific Region — Best Book
- 2010 longlisted Miles Franklin Literary Award
