= A Dutiful Daughter =

1971 novel by Thomas Keneally

- First edition
- Author: Thomas Keneally
- Language: English
- Genre: Fiction
- Publisher: Angus and Robertson
- Publication date: 1971
- Publication place: Australia
- Media type: Print
- Pages: 183 pp
- ISBN: 0207954232
- Preceded by: The Survivor
- Followed by: The Chant of Jimmie Blacksmith

A Dutiful Daughter (1971) is a novel by Australian writer Thomas Keneally.

== Story outline ==
The novel tells the bizarre story of the Glover family, living on the edges of a swamp somewhere in northern Australia. Daughter Barbara is the main character, although the story is told through the eyes of her elder brother Damian, recently returned from university. Barbara is the caregiver for their parents, who have evolved into bovine, centaur-like creatures. Much of the novel is written, unusually, in the second-person narrative.

== Critical reception ==
Hope Hewitt in The Canberra Times was conflicted by the book, finding that this "is a novel about escape, the great theme of Irish novelists; and it demonstrates as clearly as the novels of Edna O'Brien or James Joyce or Samuel Beckett that Ireland holds her rebellious children as tightly and as ambiguously as Barbara is held by her parents. Yet this is not primarily what A Dutiful Daughter is about: it is what occurs to me as I grope for yardsticks by which to define Mr Keneally's powerful and inconclusive fable. Both adjectives are just, I think. It is powerful like everything in Mr Keneally's vivid and individual idiom; and it is inconclusive, the myth advancing by a contrived, not an inevitable volition and the secondary meaning left unconnected."

Angela Carter, reviewing the book for The New York Times, found it "authentically marvelous", noting "This spirited expressionist performance has stylistic affinities with American high Gothic (e.g., Djuna Barnes and Jane Bowles) and thematic ones with James Purdy's parent-child fable, "Malcolm," though Mr. Keneally's tale lacks the stark outlines that characterize the fable as a mode. He offers an embarrassment of symbolic riches, and his prevailing Firbankian archness sometimes effects a tinkling queasiness of tone. One doesn't know whether one is cued in for a belly laugh, a nervous giggle or a shudder of horror."

== See also ==
- 1971 in Australian literature

== Notes ==
- Dedication: For John Abernethy.
