= Moses the Lawgiver (novel) =

1975 novel by Thomas Keneally

- First edition
- Author: Thomas Keneally
- Language: English
- Genre: Fiction
- Publisher: Harper and Row
- Publication date: 1975
- Publication place: Australia
- Media type: Print
- Pages: 221 pp
- ISBN: 0060647736
- Preceded by: Blood Red, Sister Rose
- Followed by: Gossip from the Forest

Moses the Lawgiver (1975) is a novel by Australian writer Thomas Keneally. The novel is based on the British television series "Moses the Lawgiver", for which Anthony Burgess wrote the script.

== Story outline ==
The novel follows the story of the biblical figure Moses who found the Ten Commandments and parted the Red Sea.

== Critical reception ==
In her review of the book in The Australian Women's Weekly Nicola Worsley concluded: "I will admit to being beguiled by the whole publication. Thomas Keneally, with a novelist's imagination and insight, has taken familiar and unfamiliar aspects of Moses' life to bring to interesting reality this dramatic tale."

== See also ==
- 1975 in Australian literature
- Moses the Lawgiver - 6-hour British television miniseries transmitted in 1973 and 1974
