= Chief of Staff (novel) =

1991 novel by Australian author Thomas Keneally

- Author: Thomas Keneally, as by William Coyle
- Language: English
- Genre: Novel
- Publisher: Chatto and Windus
- Publication date: 1991
- Publication place: Australia
- Media type: Print
- Pages: 426 pp.
- ISBN: 0701132582
- Preceded by: Flying Hero Class
- Followed by: Woman of the Inner Sea

Chief of Staff is a 1991 novel by the Australian author Thomas Keneally, writing under the pseudonym "William Coyle".

== Synopsis ==
During the Second World War, in Australia's battles against the Japanese, General Wraith's Chief of Staff, General Galton Sandforth, seduces a young Victorian woman, and, in order to ease his seduction, orders her husband be sent to Timor where he is sure to be captured or killed by the Japanese.

== Critical reception ==
Writing in The Canberra Times reviewer Robert Maclin was not impressed with the work find it "a pretty awful wartime novel, a strange concoction of sloppy 'romance' with the internal machinations of MacArthur's top brass in the war against Japan...The result is that none of the major characters is even marginally sympathetic. And since we already know how the war turned out, this tends to detract more than some what from the book's appeal. No particular insights are given on the conduct of the war unless it's the emphasis on petty backbiting and jockeying for position among the staff officers which actuated so much of their 'strategic concerns'."

== Publishing history ==
After the novel's initial publication in UK by Chatto and Windus in 1991, it was reprinted by Pan Books in 1994.

== See also ==
- 1991 in Australian literature
