= The Tyrant's Novel =

2003 novel by Australian author Tom Keneally

- First edition
- Author: Tom Keneally
- Language: English
- Publisher: Doubleday, Australia
- Publication date: 2003
- Publication place: Australia
- Media type: Print (Paperback)
- Pages: 292
- Awards: 2003 Colin Roderick Award winner
- ISBN: 1864710713
- Preceded by: An Angel in Australia
- Followed by: The Widow and Her Hero

The Tyrant's Novel is a 2003 novel by Australian novelist Tom Keneally.

== Plot summary ==
An unnamed country's tyrannical ruler, Great Uncle, commands author Alan Sheriff to ghost-write a novel that will have the literary circles of the western world talking about him. The novel is told from the point-of-view of Sheriff after he has arrived in Australia as a refugee and been incarcerated in a detention centre.

== Notes ==
- Dedication: To my brother, John Patrick, the good practitioner, with fraternal love

== Reviews ==
Alfred Hicking in The Guardian was cautious about confirming the book as one of Keneally's best: " Keneally's novels are often prodigiously long and overstuffed with a multitude of literary devices - the bulging tome of 2002's Bettany's Book suggested there were at least two better-proportioned novels fighting to get out. By Keneally's standards, The Tyrant's Novel is a mere slip of a thing. Whether it will turn out to be the other book on his epitaph, we will have to wait and see."

But Amanda Urban in Publishers' Weekly was a little more confident in her judgment. "In his hands, the cliché of the suffering artiste struggling to avoid selling out takes on real depth and pathos. This is an exquisitely wrought study of moral corruption in a convincing—and frighteningly modern—political dystopia."

== Awards and nominations ==
- 2003 winner Colin Roderick Award
