= The Cut-Rate Kingdom =

1980 novel by Australian writer Thomas Keneally

- Author: Thomas Keneally
- Language: English
- Genre: Historical fiction
- Publisher: Wildcat Press
- Publication date: 1980
- Publication place: Australia
- Media type: Print
- Pages: 126 pp.
- ISBN: 0908463065
- Preceded by: Confederates
- Followed by: Schindler's Ark

The Cut-Rate Kingdom (1980) is an historical novel by Australian writer Thomas Keneally. It was originally published by Wildcat Press, a subsidiary of The Bulletin magazine, in Australia in 1980.

== Synopsis ==
During the Second World War journalist "Paper" Tyson reports on Australian Federal politics and is a great friend of current Prime Minister Johnny Mulhall. As the Prime Minister attempts to rally the war-time efforts in the country, and placate the ambitions of the visiting American five-star General McLeod, he is carrying on a clandestine affair with the wife of an Australian army general.

== Critical reception ==
Writing in The Canberra Times Hope Hewitt noted: "It is narrated by a journalist, 'Paper' Tyson, a top paper man in Canberra, who actually lives in Parliament House and is a great friend of the reigning Prime Minister Johnny Mulhall. He writes admirable reporting prose with a tight storyline, an eye and ear for the significant detail or phrase, a nose for gossip and an ability — which Keneally in other roles might emulate — to resist the lure of purple prose...Part of the story's appeal, at least to senior citizens, is in the game of spotting the originals of the dramatis personnae. The author stops tantalisingly this side of libel, so the game remains one of guessing and never becomes complete identification."

On the publication of the 1984 edition, Stan Barney commented: "As usual with Keneally, the research is impeccable and he has captured the atmosphere of wartime Australia with remarkable felicity (though his editors let him down by allowing both the Senate and House of Representatives to be furnished in plush velvet)...An interview between Tyson and McLeod is so believable that one wonders if McLeod, behaving like a Roman proconsul, is actually MacArthur being quoted. A visit by Mulhall to the Hunter coalfields to gain the support of the miners for the war effort is another memorable episode."

== Publication history ==
After its original publication in 1980 in the Australia by publishers Wildcat Press the novel was later published as follows:

- Viking Books, USA, 1984
- Allen Lane, UK, 1984

and other paperback editions.

== See also ==
- 1980 in Australian literature

== Notes ==
- You can read an excerpt from the novel in The Bulletin, 26 January 1980.
