= The Commonwealth of Thieves =

The Commonwealth of Thieves: The Story of the Founding of Australia
- first edition
- Author: Thomas Keneally
- Language: English
- Genre: History
- Published: 2005 (hardcover) 2006 (softcover)
- Publication place: Australia
- ISBN: 978-0-099-48374-8

The Commonwealth of Thieves: The Story of the Founding of Australia (also published as A Commonwealth of Thieves: The Improbable Birth of Australia, The Commonwealth of Thieves: The birth of Australia) is a popular history book written by Thomas Keneally and published in 2005.
