= Blood Red, Sister Rose =

1974 novel by Australian writer Thomas Keneally

- First edition
- Author: Thomas Keneally
- Language: English
- Genre: Fiction
- Publisher: Collins
- Publication date: 1974
- Publication place: Australia
- Media type: Print
- Pages: 384 pp
- ISBN: 0002210878
- Preceded by: The Chant of Jimmie Blacksmith
- Followed by: Moses the Lawgiver

Blood Red, Sister Rose (1974) is a novel by Australian writer Thomas Keneally.

== Story outline ==
The novel explores the imagined psychology of Joan of Arc, and tells her story from Domrémy to the coronation of Charles VII of France in Rheims. Significant secondary characters include Charles and Gilles de Rais. The novel enters into the minds of Joan and Charles but not of Gilles. A notable feature of the book is the conversations of Joan with her voices.

== Critical reception ==
Kirkus Reviews noted about the novel: "This is probably Keneally's magnum opus, but like other culminating masterpieces its fictional components have been foreshadowed in his earlier, more modest novels. Again Keneally examines the predicament of the wise fools of this world, the forthright blunderers who, unlike the Establishment, take account of the realities of human suffering and cosmic bewilderment."

Veronica Brady, in her essay reviewing a number of Keneally novels noted that the author's Joan is "an Australian version of the French heroine, and her predicament reflects a tension central to a culture in which relationships to history on the one hand and to the environment on the other remain ambivalent."

== See also ==
- 1974 in Australian literature

== Notes ==
- Dedication: To my dear daughters Margaret and Jane.
