= An Angel in Australia =

Novel by Thomas Keneally

- First edition
- Author: Thomas Keneally
- Language: English
- Genre: Novel
- Publisher: Doubleday, Australia
- Publication date: 2002
- Publication place: Australia
- Media type: Print (Hardback & Paperback)
- Pages: 336 pp
- ISBN: 1-86471-001-2
- OCLC: 51088306
- Dewey Decimal: 823/.914 21
- LC Class: PR9619.3.K46 A84 2002
- Preceded by: Bettany's Book
- Followed by: The Tyrant's Novel

An Angel in Australia is a 2002 novel by Thomas Keneally.

== Abstract ==
Set in Australia during World War II, it follows the life of a young Catholic priest, Father Frank Darragh, in 1940s Sydney.

== Publication history ==
- An Angel in Australia, 2002, Australia, Doubleday Australia ISBN 978-1-864-71001-4
- The Office of Innocence, 2002, England, Sceptre ISBN 978-0-340-62473-9
- Office of Innocence, 2003, USA, Nan A. Talese/Doubleday ISBN 978-0-385-50763-9

== Reception ==
A review in the Australian Book Review called it "an oxymoronic book — a subdued novel", and further "Its accent is meditative, its notes of sadness leavened by the resilient self-regard of the characters he [Keneally] has mustered.".

An Angel in Australia has also been reviewed by The Sydney Morning Herald, and The New York Times.

== Awards and nominations ==
- International Dublin Literary Award: nominated 2004
- Miles Franklin Award: shortlisted 2003
