= The Widow and Her Hero =

2007 novel by Thomas Keneally

- First edition
- Author: Thomas Keneally
- Language: English
- Publisher: Doubleday, Australia
- Publication date: 2007
- Publication place: Australia
- Media type: Print (Hardback & Paperback)
- Pages: 297 pp
- ISBN: 1-86471-101-9
- OCLC: 156638789
- Preceded by: The Tyrant's Novel
- Followed by: The People's Train

The Widow and Her Hero is a 2007 novel by the Australian author Thomas Keneally.

== Synopsis ==
The novel is set in Australia during World War II. It is told from the point-of-view of Grace Waterhouse, widow of an Australian soldier who died during World War II in a covert operation against the Japanese.

== Notes ==
- Dedication: "To the Coverdales - Alex, Rory, Craig, Margaret. With the Author's love."

== Awards and nominations ==
- Miles Franklin Literary Award, 2008: longlisted
- New South Wales Premier's Literary Awards, Christina Stead Prize for Fiction, 2008: shortlisted
- Prime Minister's Literary Awards, Fiction, 2008: shortlisted

== Interviews ==
- "ABC Radio National The Book Show"

== Reviews ==
In The Age James Ley noted: "The novel does succeed in conveying an idea of heroism that is ambiguous and complex to some degree...Yet for all its endeavour, The Widow and Her Hero feels slightly laboured. If its thoughts about heroism have their nuances, this is often less true of its received ideas about the essential natures of men and women."

Penelope Lively in The Guardian concluded that "This clever, compelling novel asks some uncomfortable questions."

Andrew Reimer in the Sydney Morning Herald found the novel an "accomplished and highly readable book". He continued "The Widow and Her Hero reveals a writer who has lost none of the skill and talent he has been demonstrating for decades in a seemingly unending stream of books. In some of his more recent novels, however, Keneally has shown a tendency to rely on mechanical plots and stock characters - An Angel in Australia is a case in point, I think. In this book he has avoided most of those pitfalls."
