= The Playmaker (novel) =

1987 novel by Thomas Keneally

- First edition
- Author: Thomas Keneally
- Language: English
- Genre: Theatre-fiction
- Publisher: Hodder and Stoughton, England and Australia
- Publication date: 1987
- Publication place: Australia
- Media type: Print (Hardback & Paperback)
- Pages: 310 pp
- ISBN: 0-340-34154-8
- OCLC: 28997213
- Preceded by: A Family Madness
- Followed by: Act of Grace

The Playmaker is a 1987 novel based in Australia written by the Australian author Thomas Keneally.

== Synopsis ==
In 1789 in Sydney Cove, the remotest penal colony of the British Empire, a group of convicts and one of their captors unite to stage a play. Governor Arthur Phillip presides over the colony, where 1st Lt. Ralph Clark, sadistic Major Robert Ross (Royal Marines officer), and Midshipman Harry Brewer have a curious effect on the goings-on of the new Australian colony. As felons, perjurers, thieves, and whores rehearse, their playmaker, Ralph Clark, is derided by authority. He also becomes strangely seduced. For the play's power is mirrored in the rich, varied life of this primitive land, and, not least, in the convict and actress Mary Brenham.

The play that they plan to stage is The Recruiting Officer, a 1706 play by the Irish writer George Farquhar, which follows the social and sexual exploits of two officers, the womanising Plume and the cowardly Brazen, in the town of Shrewsbury to recruit soldiers. Many arguments are made over naturalism vs. presentationalism in acting style, and in the merits of the theatre itself.

== Dedication ==
"To Arabanoo and his brethren, still dispossessed."

== See also ==
- 1987 in Australian literature

== Notes ==
The novel was adapted into a play in 1988 by British playwright Timberlake Wertenbaker, called Our Country's Good.
