= Bring Larks and Heroes =

1967 novel by Thomas Keneally

- First edition
- Author: Thomas Keneally
- Language: English
- Publisher: Cassell, Australia
- Publication date: 1967
- Publication place: Australia
- Media type: Print (Hardback & Paperback)
- Pages: 247 pp
- ISBN: 0-7251-0060-5
- OCLC: 27549590
- Preceded by: The Fear
- Followed by: Three Cheers for the Paraclete

Bring Larks and Heroes is a 1967 novel by Australian author Thomas Keneally which won the Miles Franklin Award in 1967.

== Plot summary ==
The novel is set in an unidentified Penal colony in the South Pacific, which bears a superficial resemblance to Sydney. The novel is concerned with the exploits of the colony's "felons" (a term which was not in general use at the time the novel is set, which Keneally explains his use of in a brief preface as being more appropriate than "convicts"), in particular an Irish Marine named Phelim Halloran.

Halloran joins the marines after leaving prison and finds he identifies more with the Irish prisoners than his mainly Protestant English superiors.

== Critical reception ==
London-based Australian critic Robert Hughes stated in The Times: "Here is a rarity — an Australian novelist who does not use his Strine literary context as a prop or an excuse, and thus remains sensitive to his actual and physical environment... He is the first novelist to use Australia's colonial past intelligently, neither sentimentalising it as woozy bush-balladry nor turning it into an ersatz myth".

Leonard Ward in The Canberra Times: "Thomas Keneally's writing style is smooth and economical of words with sometimes a curious lilt to them, even when he is dealing in brutality and tragedy. He is certainly one of the best Australian novelists today."

== Dedication ==
"To Judith who nursed this poor herd of chapters to pasture."

== Publishing history ==
Following its original publication by Cassell in 1967 (reprinted in 1967 and 1968), the novel went through the following editions:

- Belmont Books, New York, 1967
- Sun Books, Melbourne, 1968 (reprinted 1972, 1974, 1976, 1978, 1984)
- Viking, New York, 1968
- Quartet, London, 1973
- Penguin, Victoria, 1988
- Text Publishing, Text Classics, Victoria, 2012

== See also ==
- 1967 in Australian literature
- Middlemiss.org
