= A Victim of the Aurora =

1977 novel by Thomas Keneally

- Author: Thomas Keneally
- Language: English
- Genre: Fiction
- Publisher: Collins, Australia
- Publication date: 1977
- Publication place: Australia
- Media type: Print
- Pages: 222 pp
- ISBN: 0002224933
- Preceded by: Season in Purgatory
- Followed by: Passenger

A Victim of the Aurora is a 1977 novel by Australian writer Thomas Keneally.

== Abstract ==
In the 1970s, Anthony Piers, the narrator of the story is an aged man living in a rest home who decides to tell the story in flashback. In the Antarctic winter in 1910, a group of gentlemen adventurers, led by Captain Sir Eugene Stewart, wait for an opportunity to strike out for the South Pole. One of them is found dead, and now Stewart must find out which of his 25 carefully-chosen men has become a murderer. Stewart, along with Piers and another man, Sullivan, form the triumvirate to get to the bottom of the matter.

== Dedication ==
"To Bob Hawke"

== Critical reception ==
In the Canberra Times Hope Hewitt stated: "the understated form of expression contributes to the real point of the book. This is not the excitement, of a whodunit, for the process of revelation is quiet and sad, in the mind not in the action. The event of greatest impact is not the disclosure of the murderer but what happened afterwards, the decision in the mind of Sir Eugene. "

== Publication history ==
After its original publication in 1977 by Collins, the novel was published as follows:

- Harcourt Brace Jovanovich, USA, 1978
- Fontana, UK, 1978

And then in various paperback, braille and sound recording editions.

== See also ==
- 1977 in Australian literature
