= A River Town =

1995 novel by Australian author Thomas Keneally

- Author: Thomas Keneally
- Language: English
- Genre: Novel
- Publisher: Heinemann
- Publication date: 1995
- Publication place: Australia
- Media type: Print
- Pages: 330 pp.
- ISBN: 0855615923
- Preceded by: Jacko
- Followed by: Bettany's Book

A River Town is a 1995 historical novel by the Australian author Thomas Keneally.

== Synopsis ==
The novel is set in the New South Wales town of Kempsey, in the new year of 1900, just after Federation. An unidentified young woman has died following an abortion and a local woman is charged with her murder.

== Critical reception ==
Writing in Australian Book Review critic Laurie Clancy commented: "Like Keneally’s earlier The Chant of Jimmie Blacksmith, the novel is set against the background of Federation, which is employed to make ironic points about the characters’ attitudes. It has a double significance here, of course, because the parallels are not only in the past but in the present and future, with the author (who is now Tom, rather than Thomas) presumably having the Republic in mind....The writing is racy, informal, highly colloquial, full of oaths and swear words and enormously energetic; in short, the book is a very good read."

Ralph Elliott reviewed the novel for The Canberra Times and found "a pervasive Irishness throughout A River Town, and of course Catholic Irishness at that, with its nuns and its oaths and its quotations from that very Celtic Australian poet of the time, Victor Daley. The ethos of the small town with its Irish flavour is strikingly like that of Maeve Binchy's recent novel The Glass Lake, and one senses the nostalgia among Kempsey's Irish settlers...Keneally's mastery of period narrative is once again impressive. We saw it in Bring Larks and Heroes no less than in Schindler's Ark."

== Publishing history ==
After the novel's initial publication in Australia by Heinemann in 1995, it was reprinted as follows:

- N. A. Telese, USA, 1995
- Hodder and Stoughton, UK, 1995
- Compass Press, USA, 1995
- Minerva, Australia, 1995
- Sceptre, UK, 1995

The novel was also translated into German in 1995, Dutch and Portuguese in 1996, and Italian in 1997.

== See also ==
- 1995 in Australian literature
