= St Patrick's Seminary =

Catholic seminary in Australia

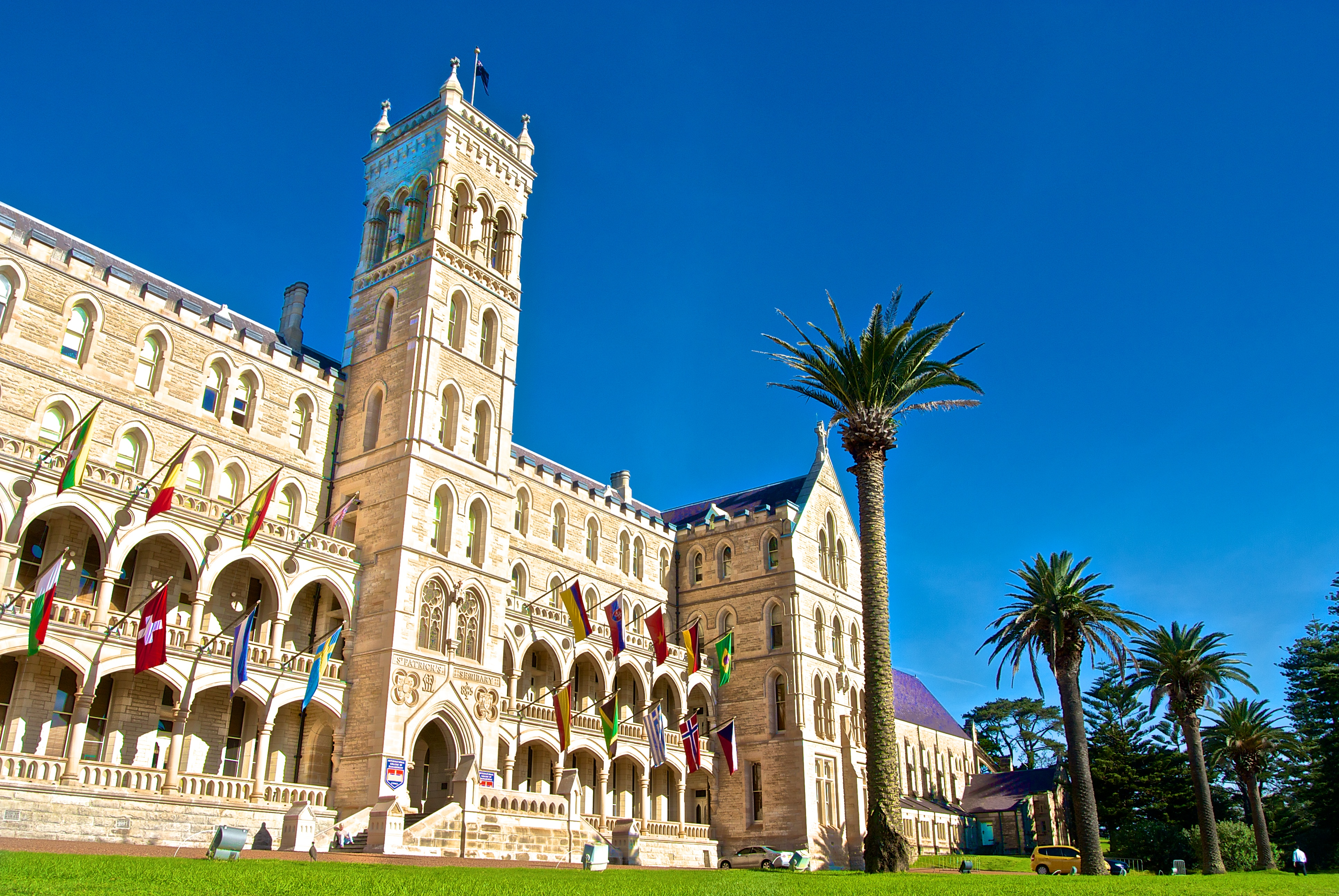
- Location: 151 Darley Road, Manly, Northern Beaches Council, New South Wales, Australia
- Coordinates: 33°48′14″S 151°17′38″E
- Founders: Archbishops of Sydney Roger Vaughan and Patrick Cardinal Moran
- Established: 23 January 1889
- Named for: St Patrick
- Architect: Joseph Sheerin and John Hennessy; Scott Green & Scott; Sydney G. Hirst & Kennedy
- Architectural style: Perpendicular Gothic
- Status: Closed (November 1995)
- Gender: Male only

Map
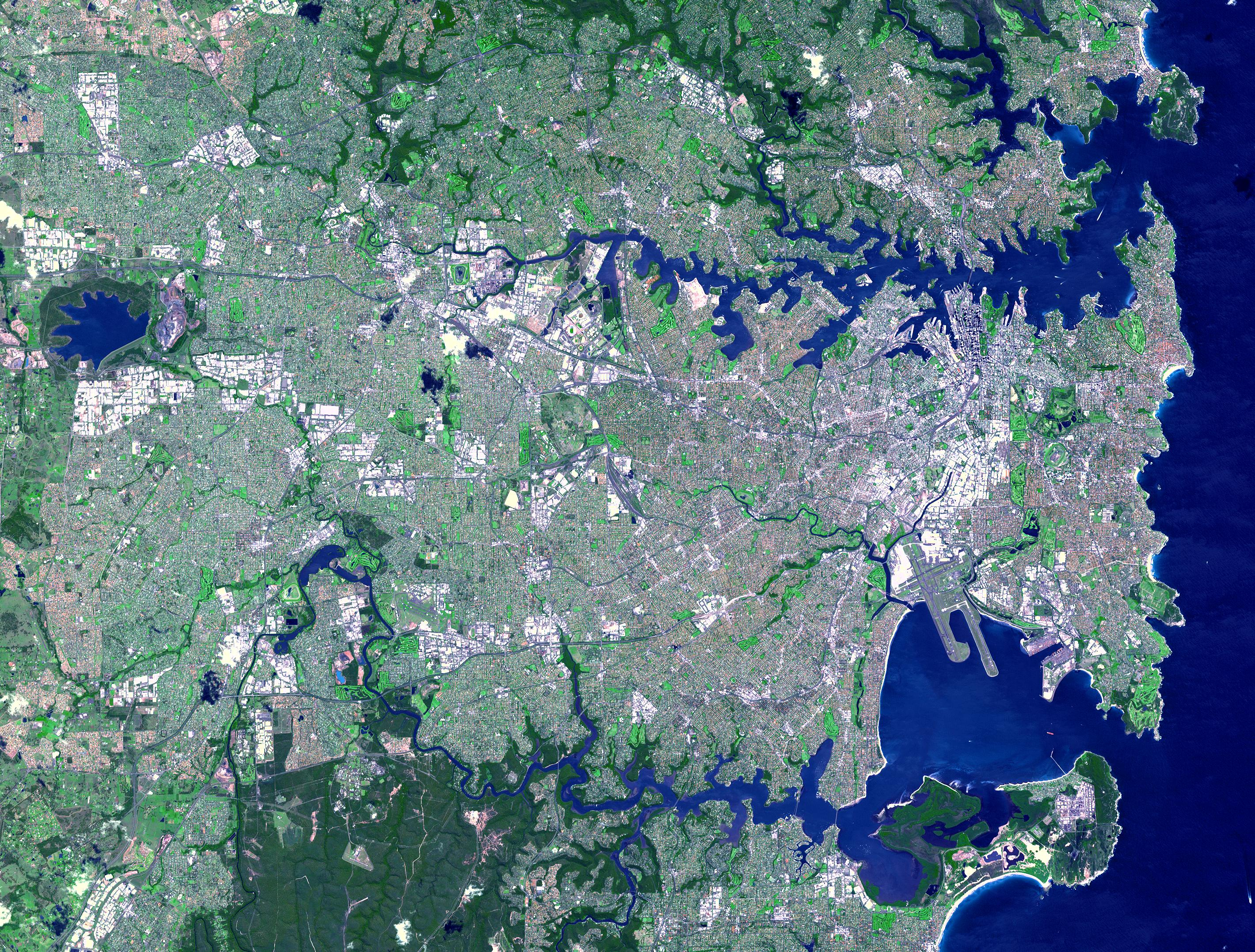
- Location within Sydney, Australia

Designations

New South Wales Heritage Register
- Official name: St. Patrick's Estate; St. Patrick's Seminary or College; Cardinal's Palace; Archbishop's Residence; St Pats; St Patricks; Saint Paul's Catholic College
- Type: State heritage (complex / group)
- Designated: 21 January 2011
- Reference no.: 1724
- Type: Other - Religion
- Category: Religion
- Builders: William Farley (Residence/Palace), WH Jennings (College/Seminary)

St Patrick's Seminary, Manly is a heritage-listed former residence of the Archbishop of Sydney and Roman Catholic Church seminary at 151 Darley Road, Manly, Northern Beaches Council, New South Wales, Australia. The property was also known as St Patrick's Estate, St. Patricks Estate, St. Patrick's Seminary or College, Cardinal's Palace, Archbishop's Residence, St Pats, St Patricks and Saint Paul's Catholic College. It was designed by Sheerin & Hennessy, Hennessy & Hennessy, Scott Green & Scott and Sydney G Hirst & Kennedy and built from 1885 to 1889 by William Farley (Residence/Palace), W. H. Jennings (College/Seminary). The property is owned by the Catholic Archdiocese of Sydney. The property was added to the New South Wales State Heritage Register on 21 January 2011.

The seminary operated from 1889 until its relocation in 1995 to Strathfield where the teaching institute has become distinct from the seminary. The Catholic Institute of Sydney is now the ecclesiastical theology faculty. The Seminary of the Good Shepherd is the house of formation. Since 1996, the property has been home to the International College of Management, Sydney (ICMS). The estate also houses a high school, residential housing, the old convent, and a children's hospice.

== Current use ==
The campus buildings are now occupied by the International College of Management, Sydney. The Cardinal Cerretti Chapel, however, is still regularly used for weddings.

The building appears as the exterior of Gatsby's mansion in the 2013 movie The Great Gatsby. Palm trees at the building's exterior were digitally removed in post-production to be faithful to the East Coast, United States, where The Great Gatsby is set.

Was the location used to portray Ridge Heights Catholic Ladies College, for the Australian series Class of '07.

== History ==
Conceived by archbishops of Sydney Roger Vaughan and Cardinal Patrick Francis Moran, the seminary was built from 1885 in Perpendicular Gothic style by Joseph Sheerin and John Hennessy on a spectacular site overlooking the Tasman Sea on a hill above Manly on Sydney's northern beaches, located towards North Head. The seminary opened on 23 January 1889. Though intended as a national seminary, it never entirely achieved that ambition.

An early student was Patrick Joseph Hartigan, author of the "John O'Brien" poems on Australian Catholic rural life. Two of the first novels of former student Thomas Keneally, The Place at Whitton (1964) and Three Cheers for the Paraclete (1968), are set in a fictionalized version of the seminary. Tony Abbott was a seminarian there.

By the time of its centenary in 1989, 1,714 men had been ordained, having completed their training at the college. These include Cardinals Gilroy, Freeman, Cassidy and Clancy and 41 bishops.

The seminary closed in November 1995, and the seminary was renamed, when numbers of seminarians no longer justified the large building and shifts in ecclesiological thinking mandated a move to the geographical centre of the Greater Sydney Area.

The following outline history has been reproduced from the Conservation Management Plan for St Patrick's Estate, Manly prepared by Tanner & Associates Pty Ltd:

To aid in understanding, the history of the site was divided into a number of periods:

- 1810-1858: covers the period of the earliest land grants in Manly including the Quarantine Grounds on North Head.
- 1859-1900: commences with the granting of land for the purpose of constructing a residence for the Catholic Archbishop of Sydney. The major buildings, St. Patrick's College, the Archbishop's Residence and the Recreation Building, date from this period.
- 1901-1935: saw the division of the site by the construction of Darley Road and the erection of the Cardinal Cerretti Memorial Chapel, the Convent and extensions to St Patrick's College.
- 1936-1985: includes major site development (with buildings now considered of marginal cultural significance).
- 1986-2002: includes the most recent work in the conservation of the site and its buildings.

1810-1858

The first land grants in Manly were made to Richard Cheers (100 acres) and Gilbert Baker (30 acres) on 1 January 1810. The western boundary line of Cheers' grant physically separated North Head from what was to become Manly. In 1832 North Head was dedicated for use as a Quarantine station.

Land for the Episcopal grant was later taken from the Quarantine Grounds.

The immediate background to the establishment of St Patrick's College and the Episcopal residence at Manly can be traced back to the mid-nineteenth century.

In 1850 public land and money had been dedicated for the purpose of constructing a residence for the Catholic Archbishop of Sydney. At first a five-acre portion of Grose Farm was suggested as a site for the Episcopal residence, but the University of Sydney had already been allocated this land in its endowment. Monastic and diocesan troubles, as McGovern has noted, along with Archbishop Polding's retirement from Sydney, caused the matter to lapse until 1856 but in that year, a request for 6 allotments at Coogee was obstructed by Surveyor General G.W. Barney, as was a subsequent claim for 15 acres on Cabarita Point on the Parramatta River.

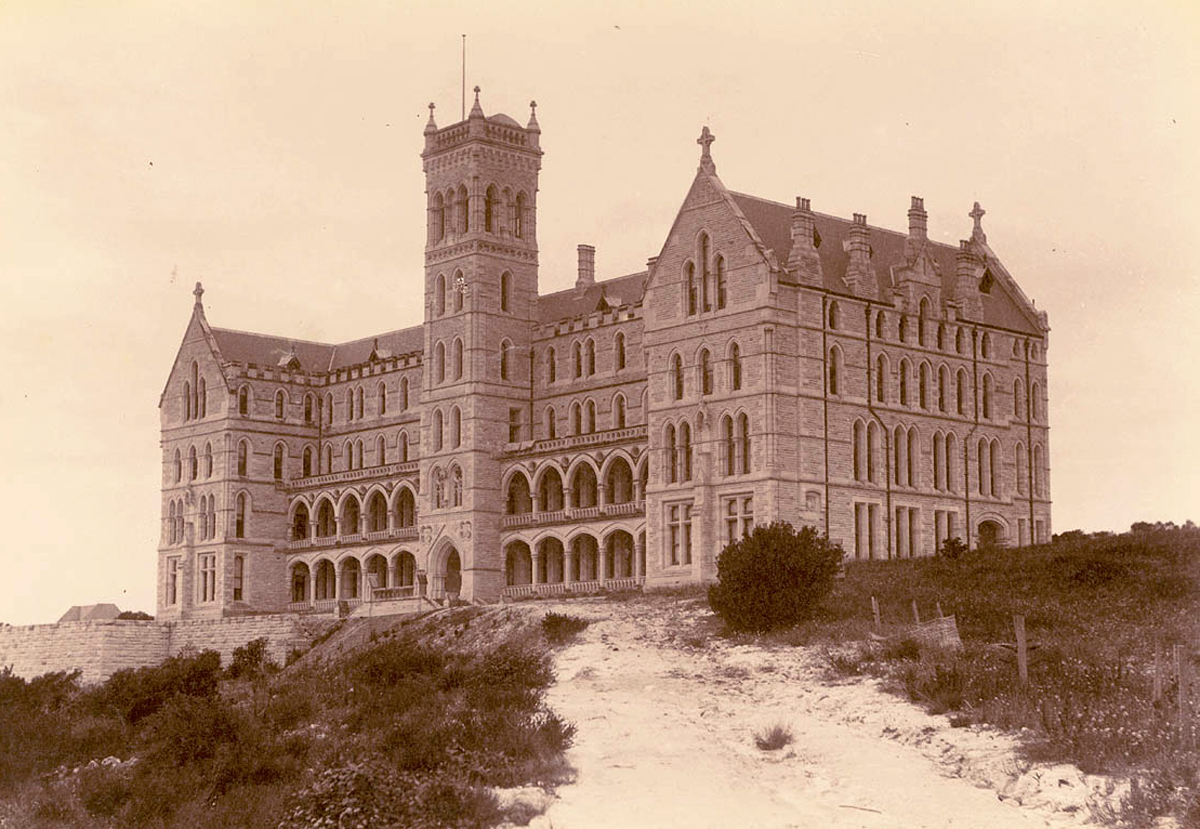
St Patrick's seminary in 1900

1859-1900

In 1859, Abbott Gregory successfully requested 60 acres adjoining and overlapping the Quarantine reserve. (On survey, the allotment was found to be 90 acres and it was subsequently cut back). "Honest" John Robertson, the Secretary for Lands, reported that since

'...The small cove called Shell Beach is a favourite place for public recreation and that the number of persons resorting there is rapidly increasing, (it) would seem to me a strong reason in favour of granting the land (with the understanding that it would be fenced. It surely is most objectionable that a portion of the land reserved for a quarantine ground should be used extensively as a place of public recreation.'.

— John Robertson

Later commentators unfairly claimed that Robertson's decision rested on "the advantage of having this Catholic property as a barrier between the outer public and the Quarantine Station (since) Catholics were so thick-skinned they would not take smallpox!" This notwithstanding, the grant was approved but the deed was not issued until 1879. As Sydney was without an ecclesiastical seminary an educational function was attached to the grant. Apparently the splendid isolation of the site, yet its general proximity to the city of Sydney was thought appropriate by the Church, given the need for access to a major urban centre which was a focus to the region, and a locale which enabled serious study and retreat from the pressures of normal society.

Ironically, as Henry Parkes pushed through the secular Public Instruction Bill, the grant on which the largest Catholic seminary in the southern hemisphere was to be built was consolidated. In 1885, plans for the Diocesan seminary were drawn up by the Sydney architects Sheerin and Hennessy. Work began during June 1885; the foundation stone was laid and blessed on 19 November 1885, and on 23 January 1889, the opening ceremony was conducted. The magnificent and commanding structure cost 70,000 pounds to build. The builder was W.H. Jennings. The driving force behind its construction was Cardinal Patrick Moran whose strength of personality is indelibly manifest in various architectural and other details, notably the use of his initials and regalia in various carved and cast panels.

The erection of the college coincided with Manly's first, though modest, suburban boom. Despite delays in building and the loss of the life of a labourer, the hill became 'the scene of great activity':

`Three hundred and twenty five men were on the pay-sheet. Labourers' tents and workmen's sheds sprang up with lightning like rapidity, so that the once desolate hill was now a veritable calico-town by day, and resembled a bivouacked army by night.' As far as building materials were concerned, the article continued,

`One cause of trouble was the contractor's inability to secure suitable stone. The opening stages of the work were built with stone hewn from near the tennis-court. The material from that quarter proving inferior, and smallpox barring entrance into the quarantine reserve, recourse had finally to be made to the quarry on the site of the Grotto of our Lady of Lourdes'.("Manly", Vol. 1, No. 1, 1916, p. 36).

The Archbishop's Residence was built slightly earlier at a cost of 10,500 pounds. Problems with its sandstone (which are evident today) led to a choice of a different quarry for the college. As with the college, Sheerin and Hennessy acted as the architects. W. Farley secured the building contract. Work commenced on the residence early in 1885 and was completed by the end of 1886.

Just as work on the college was beginning, however, Manly Council made application to the Minister of Lands for the resumption of 100 feet from the high water mark fronting Cabbage Tree Bay. Shell (later Shelly) Beach and the land to the east and south of that beach as far as the Quarantine Reserve was also requested for public use.

Such action required the surrendering of 8 acres and 27 perches from the Episcopal grant. And on 15 January 1886, the area - along with a separate, adjoining allotment of 2 acres 2 rods and 21 perches - was dedicated for public recreation. By way of compensation, however, the Church was granted 23 acres and 3 rods from the Quarantine Reserve behind and adjoining the original Episcopal grant. Later, on 23 August 1904, Cardinal Moran was to arrange for the purchase of an allotment of 3 rods and 11 perches connected to the south eastern end of the exchanged land. This was to finalise the general outline of the property.

Prior to the transfer, the Church grounds had been bounded by a "high galvanised iron and barbed wire fence". By c. 1900, however, a stone wall had been constructed along the new south eastern boundary.

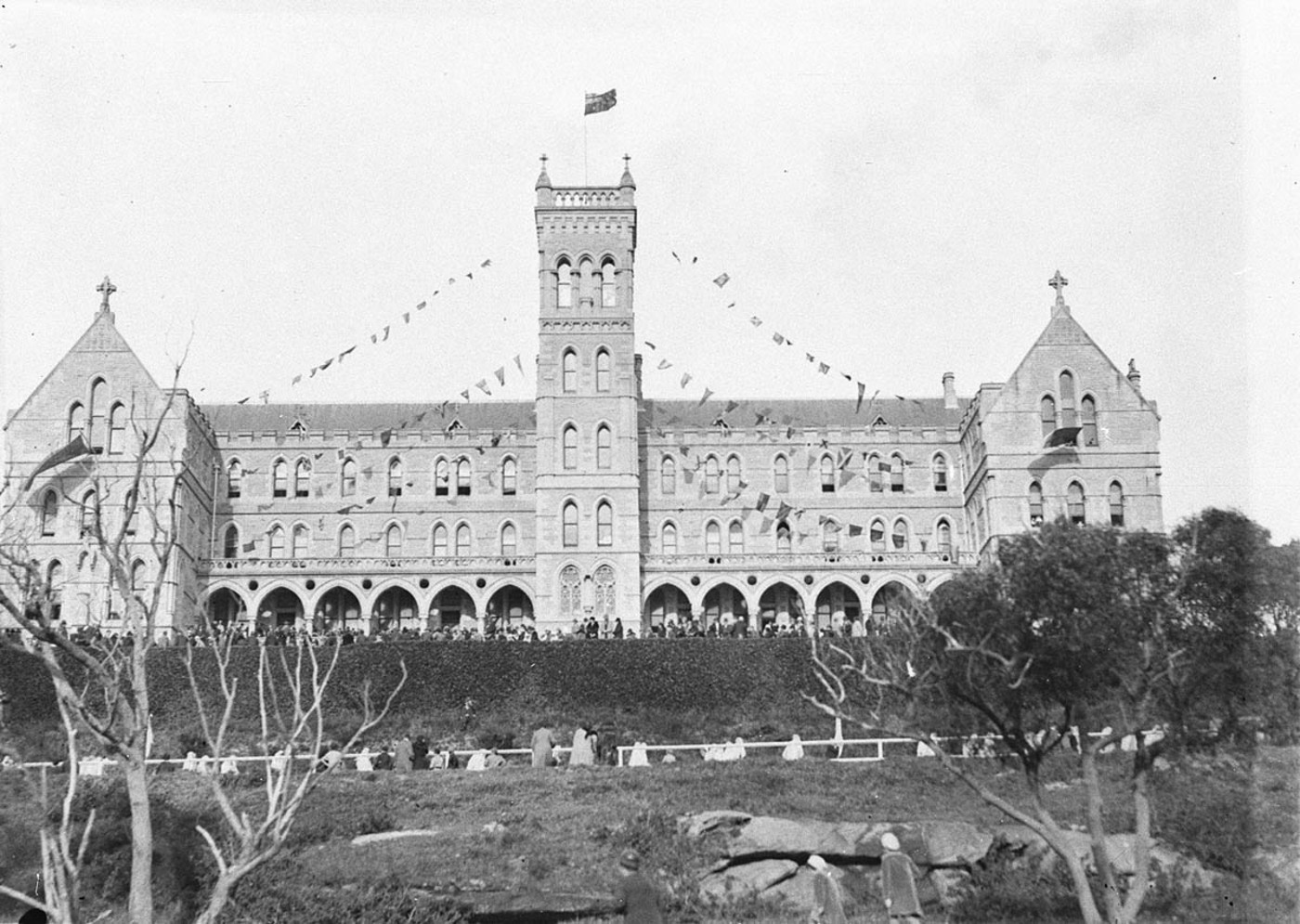
The college in 1931

1901-1937

Over the period 1900-1907 various small residential lots adjacent to College Street, Reddall Street, Fairy Bower Road and Bower Street were purchased by the Church.

The only other modification to the property's physical dimensions resulted from the dedication of a strip of land 66 feet wide through the grounds for the extension of Darley Road. The dedication was made in 1879 and its use as a public road was declared by proclamation in the Government Gazette on 22 October 1887. Construction of the road was not undertaken, however, until World War I. In return for the land lost, the Army - which used St Patrick's tower for military observations during the war - built the stone walls which still flank Darley Road. Their design and construction appears to have been based on the stone walls previously built as a barrier between the college grounds and the Quarantine Station: they are a striking and important visual element in the landscape. The walls may have been built in stages between 1914 and 1932.

In terms of building development on the site up until World War I, a recreation room which housed 2 billiard tables and a gymnasium was constructed c. 1910. It survives as the Cardinal Freeman Pastoral Centre, though part of the original verandah has been removed to facilitate construction of modern garaging.

The extant basketball and handball courts were also built c. 1910. Other improvements in sporting facilities, according to an article by Eris O'Brien in Manly:

'The football field has undergone many improvements at the hands of ardent sports committees. Much excavation of rock and sand has been done, thereby making the field sufficiently large for Australian Rules. Another improvement worth mentioning is the dressing-shed, or, as it is commonly called, the grandstand. The former shed was blown down in a wind storm . . .'

By this time, general upkeep and other maintenance costs were becoming a cause for concern. Thus, in 1914, it was decided:

`. . . That the outer fringe of college lands should be made available as revenue-producing to meet the upkeep of the palatial buildings which had been erected.'

Given that the condition of the grant forbade any on site development other than the erection of an Episcopal residence and buildings for the purpose of education, a special Bill had to be passed through the Parliament of New South Wales. The St. Patrick's College (Manly) Bill, enacted in 1914, allowed for the sub-division of approximately 21 acres "running down to and overlooking Shelly Beach and Fairy Bower". As noted in an advertisement in the Sydney Morning Herald (20 March 1915), allotments were offered on a leasehold basis on 27 March 1915, on the grounds. All rentals were annual and based on 5 per cent of the selling value over a period of 99 years. In terms of municipal development, the sub-division was well-timed: Manly was entering its second period of suburban boom.

Leaving aside developments in the sub-division, no further building activity seems to have occurred on the grounds until the 1930s.

Between 1934 and 1936 much in the way of construction took place. On 8 April 1934 the foundation stone of the Cerretti Memorial Chapel was laid and blessed: the chapel was consecrated on 14 November 1935 and officially opened 3 days later. (The designers were Hennessy, Hennessy and Co., architectural engineers of Sydney).

Construction of the Convent to the design of Ernest A. Scott, New South Wales, Green and Scott, Architects, was also undertaken in 1934, though the building was completed by the end of that year.

The large extension behind the eastern wing of the college also designed by Ernest A. Scott, Green and Scott, Architects was completed in 1935 and involved an additional two levels of student accommodation above an enlarged kitchen facility.

In 1914 the Manly Union was formed at the seminary, an organisation of ex-students and current members of the seminary. Its purpose was to create an esprit de corps among those who had lived in the seminary and to endow scholarships. From 1914 to 1972 it published almost annually a magazine, Manly, with extensive coverage of life in the seminary and wider cultural issues.

1938-1995

Post World War II developments were substantial. Kelly House was built in 1954 for residential purposes; a swimming pool made of reinforced concrete was begun at the end of 1956 (after the old baths behind the Archbishop's Residence were ruined in a violent storm) and opened on 17 November 1957; Gilroy House was opened in 1961 a brick addition was made to the convent in c. 1961; and St. Paul's High School was built in c. 1967 with further buildings added in the late 1970s.

The last alteration to the physical dimensions of the property was made in 1975, when a 25m to 30m foreshore area of the Estate at Spring Cove was donated by the Church to Manly Council, thereby providing a public walkway connecting Little Manly Point to Spring Cove. A block wall consistent in height with Estate stone walls was constructed on the new site boundary.

In 1986 Manly Council commissioned comprehensive Environmental Investigation and Heritage Studies of the St Patrick's Estate in preparation for the new LEP.

In 1988 Manly Council's LEP zoned the majority of land north of Darley Road Special Uses Seminary, the majority of land south of Darley Road Church Purposes and four parcels of land within the Estate for residential development. In 1993 the Church announced that the Seminary would be vacating the St Patrick's estate site in 1995.

Extensive objections by Manly Council to redevelopment plans, including concerns over the long-nosed bandicoot population, were resolved in the Land and Environment Court.

1996 - 2002

At the end of 1995 the Seminary moved from St Patrick's College, Manly, to a site in the vicinity of the Australian Catholic University at Strathfield. Between December 1995 and May 1996, college buildings comprising Moran House, the Pastoral Centre and Kelly House were conserved and adapted with new services throughout to accommodate the residential training college - International College of Tourism and Hotel Management, which has a lease over these buildings. The new college was opened in May 1996.

During this period the derelict concrete swimming pool and handball courts were demolished, and the landscaped setting in the immediate vicinity of the college buildings was repaired and its plantings enhanced.

Some religious artefacts relating to the Seminary including some statuary, two stained glass windows (the "Rite of Tonsure" and 'Ordination of a Subdeacon') and the Stations of the Cross were moved with the Seminary to Strathfield.

The following developments have occurred on the site in recent times:

- Construction of vegetative links as bandicoot supportive habitat in locations consistent with the 1995 CMP - 1997–1998
- Construction of Bear Cottage Hospice for Children adjacent to Fairy Bower Road completed in 2001
- Construction of new attached dwellings and apartments in the eastern quarter amongst existing coastal honeysuckle trees (Banksia) and other trees; new housing in the northern quarter (adjacent to College Street which were due for completion April 2002) and minor upgrades to the garden itself.

In January 2007 consent was granted by Manly Council to redevelop precincts 4,5, 6 and 10 of the estate for residential use, including the Spring Cove portion of the Estate, which was subdivided into 22, later amended to be 21 lots. A number of buildings have been completed or are in differing stages of construction since.

== Description ==
The Archbishop's Residence (1884–85)

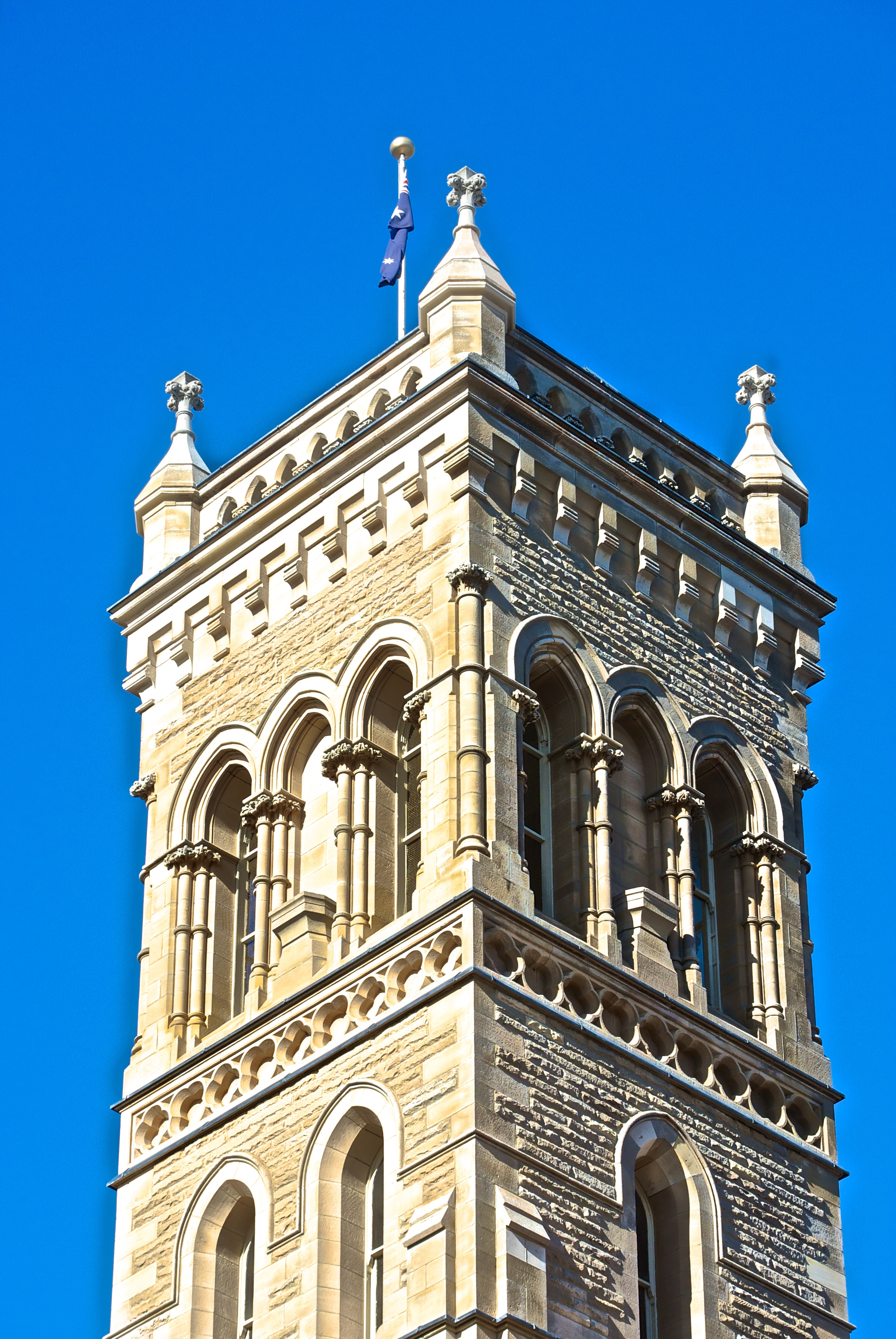
Central Tower

Termed the "Archiepiscopal Residence" on the original architect's drawings, and colloquially termed 'Cardinal's Palace' during the 20th century, this was the first structure completed on the site to an impressive scale and budget. It is a good example of the domestic Gothic Revival style designed by Sheerin and Hennessy Architects and while its Gothic detailing can be held to be in the tradition established by architect Augustus Welby (A.W.) Pugin (1812–1852) in England, the cast iron verandahs are a 19th-century response to the colonial climate, while other elements such as the central flèche and convenient planning presage Edwardian architectural trends. The cast iron panels of the verandahs contain Moran's initials and their detailing reflects the later 19th century "Aesthetic Movement". Two terracotta statues of saints dominate the bays of the main elevation. The building is two storeys of stone with a slate roof. It was built by William Farley, Builder, for 10,000 pounds.

The cedar joinery, parquetry flooring and stained glass windows are of exceptional quality. There are six principal rooms on the Ground Floor plus kitchens and a servants wing. The first floor contains bedrooms. The ground floor dining room, the first floor "Council" room (originally planned as a Library) with vaulted ceiling, and the cedar staircase display fine materials, detailing and craftsmanship.

The Archbishop's Residence and the St. Patrick's Seminary were once linked by a carriageway.

Over time verandahs have been infilled and the stable block altered, but the original fabric remains generally intact. The sandstone is of a poorer quality than Moran House and some deterioration is evident.

The immediate landscape setting comprises chiefly cast iron gates with stone piers to Darley Road, the driveway, a carriage loop and a vista to the harbour and related plantings to all the above. The plantings are now mature and certain elements such as the pine plantations require replacement. There are remnants of the earlier larger gardens evident on the lower portions of the site.

St. Patrick's Seminary (1885–89)

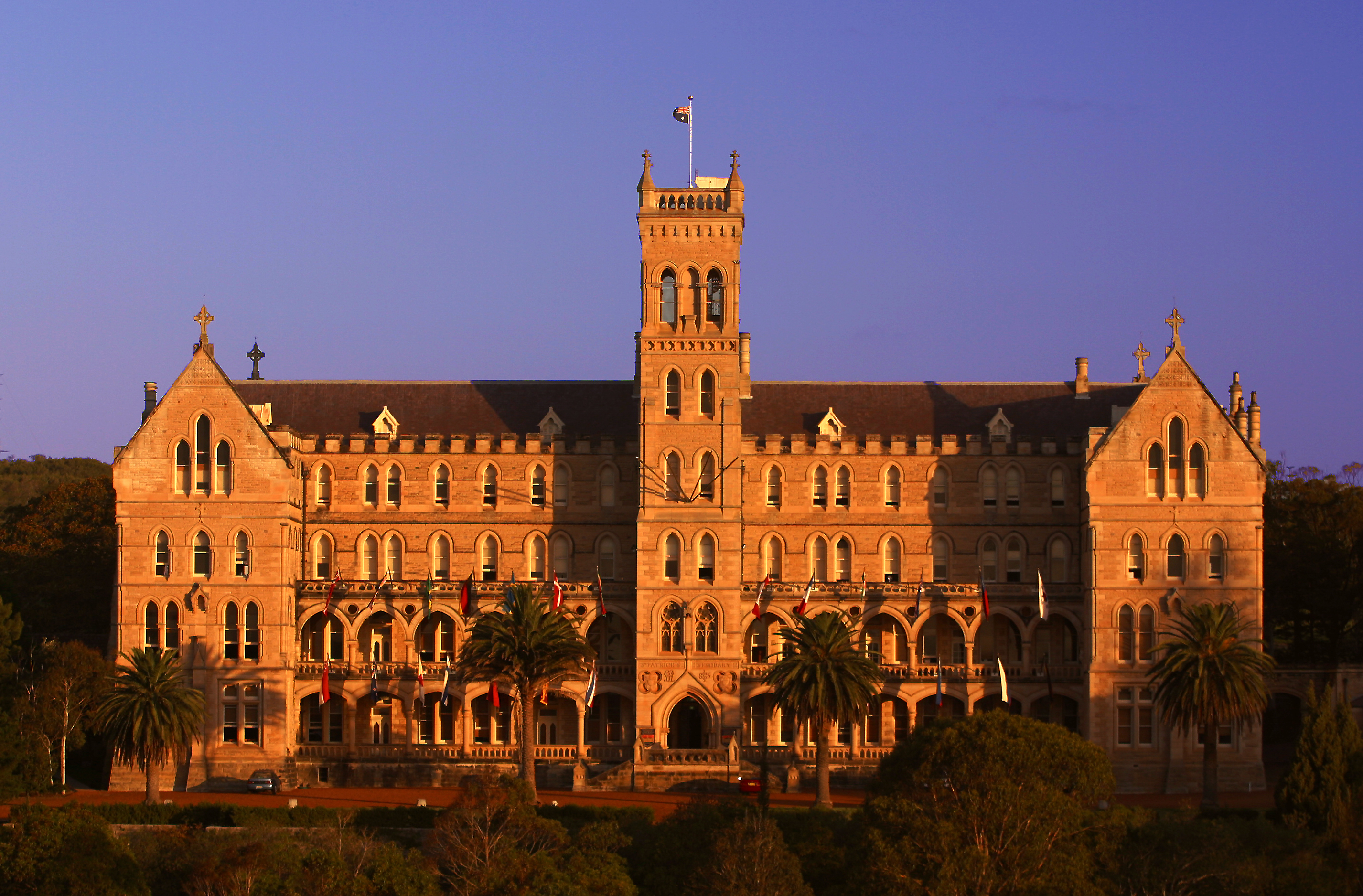
St Patrick's Seminary at dusk

The seminary was designed by Sheerin and Hennessy and built by W.H. Jennings between 1885 and 1889. The stone building is four storeys high with a six level central bell tower and a slate roof. A two storeyed colonnade flanks the central entrance. The building is sited of high quality construction in the perpendicular Gothic style and impressive in scale.

The sandstone used is of superior quality and steel members spliced into hardwood beams allows large spans. The building was designed with modern plumbing and a service lift. The simplicity of the planning and the effective use of good materials - sandstone, slate, selected timbers, marble and leaded glazing show an architectural initiative designed to last well over time. A certain grand austerity pervades the design.

The entrance vestibule and "cloisters" with cedar and kauri pine ceilings, stained glass windows and marble tiled floor lead to a monumental stone staircase. Accents such as the "crossed" architraves can be found in other Gothic buildings in Sydney (such as the original portion of the University of Sydney) and may, in fact, derive from the Oxford Movement.

The Library (former chapel), Refectory, Aula Maxima, Lecture Rooms, and private oratory are located on the ground and first floors and form a sequence of interiors, some of which are connected by interconnecting doors.

The second and third floors provided accommodation for the seminarians in the form of small cells and communal bathroom facilities.

The addition to the kitchen wing in 1935, designed by Ernest A. Scott, Green and Scott, Architects, is of comparable quality and detailing. A further addition to the kitchen wing, of lesser quality, was constructed c.1970.

c. 1970 the second floor cubicles were converted into private rooms and bathrooms were upgraded.

Originally the main interiors were decorated with rich contrasting timbers on ceilings and doors (and door surrounds) and the use of a stencilled dado, and while covered or muted, traces of this taste can be found.

While some parallels can be made between this building and Sacred Heart Convent, Rose Bay and St Joseph's College at Hunters Hill, its special role and planning set it apart. The first floor corridor with its timber trussing and the eastern first floor verandah do evoke architect John Horbury Hunt's use of timber but generally the detailing is economical and practical, while remaining Gothic and ornamental.

The Seminary use of this building ended in 1995. Major conservation works to Moran House were completed in 1996. The building is now leased and occupied by the International College of Tourism and Hotel Management.

Conservation works completed in 1996 included:

- Repairs to stone facade, slate roofing, cast iron gutters and downpipes
- New Services throughout including fire services (sprinklers, smoke detectors) and lift
- Refurbishment of all rooms including bathrooms
- Introduction of glazed screens for smoke compartmentation.

Cardinal Freeman Pastoral Centre (formerly Recreation Centre) (1910) A single storey "Federation" style.building of rusticated coursed sandstone with a slate roof and bullnosed corrugated iron verandah was built in 1910 to provide a gymnasium and two billiard rooms for the seminarians.

The building was altered c.1970 to accommodate teaching areas and a workshop. The verandah was partially demolished to enable the construction of carports, which did not complement the original centre.

Major conservation works completed in 1996 included:

- repairs to facade and roof
- reconstruction of northern verandah
- repair of coachhouse
- adaptation for students' kitchen, bar and lounge

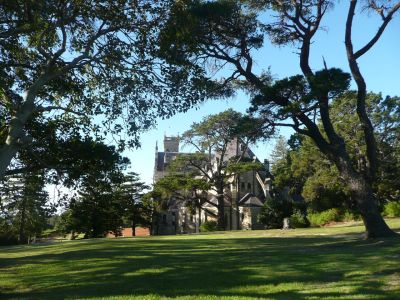
The Cardinal Cerretti Memorial Chapel

The Cardinal Cerretti Memorial Chapel (1934–35)

This was built 40 years after the Seminary, in 1934-5 complements it in Gothic style, materials and details. It was designed by architects Hennessy, Hennessy & Co. The east end is convenient to the seminary and has an emphasis on function rather than architecture; the architectural highlight is the cluster of chapels at the west end and the 20th century structural devices which enabled the column free interiors without massive buttressing. The "cloister" aisle along the northern edge of the building, with its sequence of altars, is a distinctive and well-lit space.

It is a lofty single storey building with organ and choir loft and cloisters. The nave is column-free, and features an uninterrupted vaulted ceiling with silky oak joinery, jarrah parquetry flooring and decorative plaster. The special features of the sanctuary are marble altar, sandstone altar canopy and terrazzo flooring. The chevet end displays fine marble altars and magnificent stained glass windows.

The major windows appear to be of English manufacture, the lesser ones of local manufacture. (John Hardman & Co, Birmingham)

Conservation works completed in 1996 include repairs to slate roof, gutters and downpipes and stonework.

The St Therese's Convent (1934)

This was designed by Ernest A. Scott, Green and Scott, Architects, to provide accommodation for the Order of Our Lady Help of Christians. Built in 1934, it is two storeys high with rendered walls and stone trims with its main elevation accented by a copper turret denoting the chapel and a major archway framing the outlook from a verandah. The verandah was, at an early stage, glassed in. The chapel was originally a two storeyed space with a vaulted ceiling behind the eastern bay and several small stained glass windows. The building is a well resolved domestic Edwardian dwelling.

The Convent is sited on an axis with the kitchen wing of Moran House and is linked to the Seminary by a concrete pedestrian bridge. The residential addition designed by Sydney G. Hirst and Kennedy, Architects and constructed in 1962 does not complement the original convent.

Today the convent is home to the Head Office of the International College of Management, Sydney (ICMS).

St. Paul's College (1964–74)

The college complex was built over ten years. The buildings are concrete-framed with face brick infill panels providing classrooms and staff and student amenities.

Its location close to the Archbishop's Residence is unfortunate and its mass and basic detailing compromises the amenity of the Archbishop's Residence.

=== Condition ===
As at 19 March 2003, the buildings of the St Patrick's College group were all in good condition. The Archbishop's Residence and the Convent require conservation works.

=== Archbishop's residence gardens ===
The Archbishop's Residence was opened in 1886. Its gardens, which comprise most of the study area, are believed to have been laid out in the late 1880s. Photographic evidence indicates that the Archbishop's gardens included landscaping, plantings and pathways. The area to be impacted by the proposed remediation works is within the gardens. A long linear path with steps linked the Residence with the harbour and the wharf, providing the link to the main transport option until the extension of Darley Road, and access to the terraced gardens, with their orchards, vegetable and flower beds.

The significant buildings comprising St Patrick's Estate are remarkably intact. The 19th century landscaped setting of the Archbishop's Residence has been removed by 20th century development. Little remains of the extensive gardens and paths. The 19th century landscaped setting of the St Patrick's College is reasonably intact including evidence of the grotto and lake. (Tanner & Associates Pty Ltd)

=== Modifications and dates ===
- Extensions to the Kitchen wing of St Patrick's College (1935) designed by Ernest A Scott, Green & Scott, Architects.
- Kelly House (1954) designed by Hennessy, Hennessy & Co Architects.
- Gilroy house ( 1961) designed by Jenkins & MacClurcan.
- Extensions to the Convent (1963) designed by Sydney G Hirst & Kennedy, Architects.
- St Pauls College (1964) designed by Civil & Civic.
- Extensions to the Moran House (St Patrick's College) Kitchen designed by Sydney G Hirst & Kennedy, Architects.
- Extensions to St Pauls College ( 1974).
- Conservation and adaptation of Moran House, Kelly House, the Pastoral Centre and landscaped environs, in conjunction with the International College of Tourism and Hotel Management.(1996) designed by Howard Tanner & Associates Architects.
- Conservation of the Cardinal Cerretti Memorial Chapel (1996) designed by Howard Tanner & Associates Architects - two windows ('Rite of Tonsure' and 'Ordination of a Subdeacon') removed and installed at Seminary of the Good Shepherd, Homebush, each approx 45 cm x 120 cm.
- Construction of Bear Cottage Hospice for Children for the Children's Hospital (2000) designed by MSJ Architects.
- Construction of Precinct 2 Attached Dwellings and Apartments (2002) designed by Tanner & Associates Architects.

== See also ==
- Roman Catholicism in Australia
