= The Fear (Keneally novel) =

Book by Thomas Keneally

- First edition
- Author: Thomas Keneally
- Language: English
- Genre: Fiction
- Publisher: Cassell, Australia
- Publication date: 1965
- Publication place: Australia
- Media type: Print
- Pages: 229pp
- Preceded by: The Place at Whitton
- Followed by: Bring Larks and Heroes

The Fear (1965) is a novel by Australian writer Thomas Keneally. The novel is also known by the title By the Line.

== Story outline ==
The novel follows the story of Danny Jordan, a boy who has been moved from the Macleay Valley – in the Mid North Coast area of New South Wales – to Sydney during the Second World War due to the threat of a Japanese invasion. Danny and his family end up living next door to a violent Communist who takes a disliking to the boy.

== Critical reception ==
Maurice Dunlevy in The Canberra Times wasn't impressed with the novel: "The Fear is a novel in search of a subject. Keneally doesn't know where he is going and his characters don't know where to take him...What he is doing is not writing a novel but filing a fact-filled feature story. But facts are facts and truth often has nothing to do with them. Truth in literature is usually born of the imagination. It is possible that it has some relationship with facts, with hard-earned experience, but it never slavishly follows their dictates."

Writing about the novel on its re-issue in 1968 a reviewer in Woroni noted: "Much has been written on the brilliance of Keneally's prose, and he has been hailed as one of the most exciting writers to appear in Australia for many years. The cover blurb of this edition of The Fear tells us that Keneally has 'a violent imagination for the macabre and horrifying', but that at the same time 'his devils are human.' To this reader Keneally's devils fall far short of the claims made about them...What sets Keneally in the front rank of authors is his realistic portrayal of a child's actions, thoughts and emotions."

== See also ==
- 1965 in Australian literature

== Notes ==
In an interview conducted to coincide with the release of his novel Shame and the Captives in 2013 Susan Wyndham noted: "The Cowra breakout featured briefly – and inaccurately, he says now – in Keneally's second novel, The Fear, which he has described dismissively as the obligatory account of a novelist's childhood. It is one of many recurring themes in his life and work."

The working title of the book was No Need for Spoils.

Keneally revised the novel in the late 1980s and it was republished under the title By the Line by the University of Queensland Press in 1989.
