= The Survivor (Keneally novel) =

1969 novel by Thomas Keneally

- First edition
- Author: Thomas Keneally
- Language: English
- Publisher: Angus and Robertson, Australia
- Publication date: 1969
- Publication place: Australia
- Media type: Print (Hardback & Paperback)
- Pages: 282
- ISBN: 0-207-95312-0
- OCLC: 79598
- Dewey Decimal: 823
- LC Class: PZ4.K336 Su PR9619.3.K46
- Preceded by: Three Cheers for the Paraclete
- Followed by: A Dutiful Daughter

The Survivor is a 1969 novel by Australian author Thomas Keneally.

== Premise ==
Alec Ramsey talks about a mission to Antarctica in the 1920s of which he was a survivor. He feels guilt over the death of the expedition leader, Leeming.

Ramsey had an affair with Leeming's wife and is torn with guilt over it.

== Background ==
The book was originally called On Ice.

Keneally's research included travelling to Antarctica on a US Navy ship. It was also based on his experience of being a university lecturer in Armidale.

The book was dedicated to W. H. Crook.

== Reception ==
The Sydney Morning Herald called it "this rich, indigestible plumb of a book."

The Canberra Times said "the book is immensely entertaining. It has a pleasantly intriguing story to tell, with plenty of suspense and much highly diverting academic comedy."

== Awards and nominations ==
Captain Cook Bicentenary Awards, Novel Section, 1970: joint winner with Barry Oakley's Let's Hear it for Predergast.

== Reviews ==
- "Southerly" Vol 30 No 1, 1970, by Michael Wilding
