= Thomas Keneally =

Australian novelist (born 1935)

Thomas Keneally AO
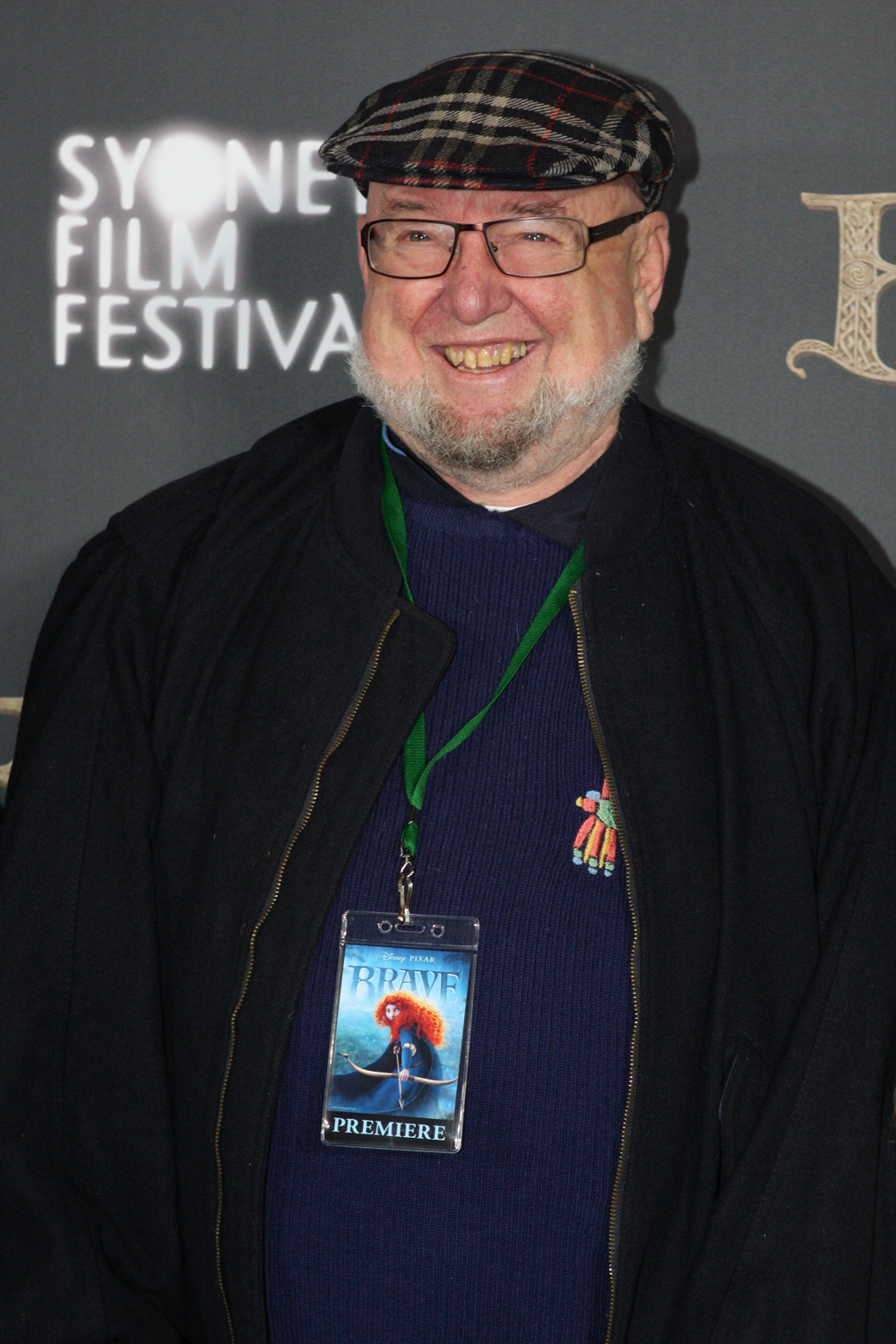
- Keneally in 2012
- Born: Thomas Michael Keneally; 7 October 1935 (age 91); Sydney, New South Wales, Australia
- Occupations: Novelist; playwright; essayist; actor
- Spouse: Judy Martin (m. 1965)
- Children: 2
- Writing career
- Notable awards: Booker Prize
- Thomas Keneally's voice Recorded December 2007 from the BBC Radio 4 programme Bookclub

Thomas Michael Keneally (born 7 October 1935) is an Australian novelist, playwright, essayist, and actor. He is best known for his historical fiction novel Schindler's Ark, the story of Oskar Schindler's rescue of Jews during the Holocaust, which won the Booker Prize in 1982. The book would later be adapted into Steven Spielberg's 1993 film Schindler's List, which won seven Academy Awards, including Best Picture.

== Early life ==
Keneally's parents (Edmund Thomas Keneally and Elsie Margaret Coyle) were born to Irish fathers in the timber and dairy town of Kempsey, New South Wales, and although he was born in Sydney, he too spent his early years in Kempsey. His father, Edmund Thomas Keneally, flew for the Royal Australian Air Force in World War II, then returned to work in a small business in Sydney. By 1942, the family had moved to 7 Loftus Crescent, Homebush, a suburb in the Inner West of Sydney and Keneally was enrolled at Christian Brothers St Patrick's College, Strathfield. Shortly after, his brother John was born. Keneally studied Honours English for his Leaving Certificate in 1952, under Brother James Athanasius McGlade, and won a Commonwealth scholarship.

Keneally then entered St Patrick's Seminary, Manly, to train as a Catholic priest. Although he was ordained as a deacon while at the seminary, after six years there he left in a state of depression and without ordination in the priesthood. He worked as a Sydney schoolteacher before his success as a novelist and was a lecturer at the University of New England (1968–70).

Keneally was known as "Mick" until 1964 but began using the name Thomas when he started publishing, after advice from his publisher to use his real first name.

== Career ==
Keneally's first story was published in The Bulletin magazine in 1962 under the pseudonym Bernard Coyle. By February 2014, he had written more than 50 books, including 30 novels. He is particularly famed for his Schindler's Ark (1982) (later republished as Schindler's List), the first novel by an Australian to win the Booker Prize and is the basis of the film Schindler's List. He had already been shortlisted for the Booker three times prior to that: 1972 for The Chant of Jimmie Blacksmith, 1975 for Gossip from the Forest, and 1979 for Confederates.

Many of his novels are reworkings of historical material, although modern in their psychology and style.

Premièred at London's Royal Court Theatre, the play Our Country's Good by Timberlake Wertenbaker is based on Keneally's book The Playmaker. In it, convicts deported from Britain to the Empire's penal colony of Australia perform George Farquhar's Restoration comedy The Recruiting Officer set in the English town of Shrewsbury. Artistic Director Max Stafford-Clark wrote about his experiences of staging the plays in repertoire in his book Letters to George.

Keneally has also acted in a handful of films. He had a small role in Fred Schepisi's The Chant of Jimmie Blacksmith (1978) (based on his own novel) and played Father Marshall in the award-winning film The Devil's Playground (1976), also by Schepisi.

Keneally was a member of the Literature Board of the Australia Council from 1985 to 1988 and President of the National Book Council from 1985 to 1989.

Keneally was a visiting professor at the University of California, Irvine (UCI) where he taught the graduate fiction workshop for one quarter in 1985. From 1991 to 1995, he was a visiting professor in the writing program at UCI.

In 2006, Peter Pierce, Professor of Australian Literature, James Cook University, wrote:

Keneally can sometimes seem the nearest that we have to a Balzac of our literature; he is in his own rich and idiosyncratic ways the author of an Australian 'human comedy'.

The Tom Keneally Centre opened in August 2011 at the Sydney Mechanics' School of Arts, housing Keneally's books and memorabilia. The site is used for book launches, readings and writing classes.

Keneally is an ambassador of the Asylum Seekers Centre, a not-for-profit that provides personal and practical support to people seeking asylum in Australia.

== Personal life ==
Keneally married Judy Martin, then a nurse, in 1965, and they had two daughters, Margaret and Jane.

Keneally was the founding chairman (1991–93) of the Australian Republic Movement and published a book on the subject Our Republic in 1993. Several of his Republican essays appear on the website of the movement. He is also a keen supporter of rugby league football, in particular the Manly-Warringah Sea Eagles club of the NRL. In 2004, he gave the sixth annual Tom Brock Lecture. He made an appearance in the 2007 rugby league drama film The Final Winter.

In March 2009, the Prime Minister of Australia, Kevin Rudd, gave an autographed copy of Keneally's biography Lincoln to President Barack Obama as a state gift.

Keneally's nephew Ben is married to the former senior Australian Labor Party Senator, Kristina Keneally. She is also a former Premier of New South Wales and Sky News Australia newscaster.

== Schindler's Ark ==
Keneally wrote the Booker Prize–winning novel in 1982, inspired by the efforts of Poldek Pfefferberg, a Holocaust survivor. In 1980, Keneally met Pfefferberg in the latter's shop, and learning that Keneally was a novelist, Pfefferberg showed him his extensive files on Oskar Schindler, including the original list itself. Keneally was interested, and Pfefferberg became an advisor for the book, accompanying Keneally to Poland where they visited Kraków and the sites associated with the Schindler story. Keneally dedicated Schindler's Ark to Pfefferberg: "who by zeal and persistence caused this book to be written." He said in an interview in 2007 that what attracted him to Oskar Schindler was that "it was the fact that you couldn't say where opportunism ended and altruism began. And I like the subversive fact that the spirit breatheth where it will. That is, that good will emerge from the most unlikely places". The book was later made into the movie Schindler's List (1993) directed by Steven Spielberg, earning his first Best Director Oscar. Keneally's meeting with Pfefferberg and their research tours are detailed in the book Searching for Schindler: A Memoir.

In 1996, the State Library of New South Wales, in Sydney, New South Wales, Australia, purchased some of the Pfefferberg documents that inspired Keneally, from a private collector, and they are now housed there.

== Honours ==
Keneally was elected a Fellow of the Royal Society of Literature in 1973.

In 1983, Keneally was made an Officer of the Order of Australia (AO). He is an Australian Living Treasure. Keneally has stated that he was once offered the title of Commander of the Order of the British Empire, and that he refused it. "I said I pitied any empire of which I was a commander".

In 2010 the Australian postal service issued a stamp in his honour.

Keneally has been awarded honorary doctorates including one from the National University of Ireland.

Awards	
Booker Prize	The Chant of Jimmie Blacksmith, shortlisted 1972
Booker Prize	Gossip from the Forest, shortlisted 1975
Booker Prize	Confederates, shortlisted 1979
Booker Prize	Schindler's Ark, winner 1982
Miles Franklin Award	Bring Larks and Heroes, winner 1967
Miles Franklin Award	Three Cheers for the Paraclete, winner 1968
Miles Franklin Award	An Angel in Australia, shortlisted 2003
Miles Franklin Award	The Widow and Her Hero, longlisted 2008
Prime Minister's Literary Awards	The Widow and Her Hero, shortlisted 2008
New South Wales Premier's Literary Awards	Special Award, winner 2008
Helmerich Award	Peggy V. Helmerich Distinguished Author Award, 2007
ARA Historical Novel Prize	Corporal Hitler's pistol, winner 2022

== Bibliography ==
=== Novels ===
- The Place at Whitton (1964)
- The Fear (1965) Rewritten in 1989 as By the Line
- Bring Larks and Heroes (1967), winner of the Miles Franklin Award, set in an unidentified British penal colony
- Three Cheers for the Paraclete (1968), winner of the Miles Franklin Award, comic novel of a doubting priest
- The Survivor (1969), a survivor looks back on a disastrous Antarctic expedition
- A Dutiful Daughter (1971), Keneally's personal favourite
- The Chant of Jimmie Blacksmith (1972), also filmed. Written through the eyes of an exploited Aboriginal man who explodes in rage. Based on an actual incident. Keneally has said he would not now presume to write in the voice of an Aboriginal person, but would have written the story as seen by a white character.
- Blood Red, Sister Rose (1974), a novel based loosely on the life of Joan of Arc
- Moses the Lawgiver (1975)
- Gossip from the Forest (1975), tells of the negotiation of the armistice that ended World War I
- Season in Purgatory (1976), love among Tito's partisans in World War II
- A Victim of the Aurora (1977), a detective story set on an Antarctic expedition
- Ned Kelly and the City of the Bees (1978), a book for children
- Passenger (1979)
- Confederates (1979), based on Stonewall Jackson's army
- The Cut-Rate Kingdom (1980), Australia at war in 1942
- Schindler's Ark (1982), winner of the Booker Prize, later released and filmed as Schindler's List
- A Family Madness (1985)
- The Playmaker (1987), prisoners perform a play in Australia in the 18th Century
- Act of Grace (1985), (under the pseudonym William Coyle) Published as Firestorm in the US
- By the Line (1989) (Note: Revised version of The Fear (1965).)
- Towards Asmara (1989), the conflict in Eritrea
- Flying Hero Class (1991), Palestinians hijack an aeroplane carrying an Aboriginal folk dance troupe
- Chief of Staff (1991), (under the pseudonym William Coyle)
- Woman of the Inner Sea (1992), Keneally retells a story once told him by a young woman that haunted his imagination
- Jacko (1993), madness and television
- A River Town (1995)
- Bettany's Book (2000)
- An Angel in Australia (2000), also published as Office of Innocence
- The Tyrant's Novel (2003), an Australian immigration detainee tells his story
- The Widow and Her Hero (2007), the effect of war on those left behind
- The People's Train (2009), a dissident escapes from Russia to Australia in 1911, only to return to fight in the revolution
- The Daughters of Mars (2012), two Australian sisters struggle to nurse soldiers horrifically wounded in World War I
- Shame and the Captives (2014), ISBN 147673464X, recounts the escape of Japanese prisoners of war in New South Wales during WWII
- Napoleon's Last Island (2015)
- Crimes of the Father (2016)
- Two Old Men Dying (2018)
- The Book of Science and Antiquities (2019)
- The Dickens Boy (2020)
- Corporal Hitler's Pistol (2021)
- Keneally, Tom (1 November 2022). Fanatic Heart. Milsons Point, NSW: Vintage Australia. ISBN 978-0-14-377781-6. OCLC 1333614618. (Note: Interview: "Fanatic Heart by Tom Keneally". ABC Radio. 25 November 2022.) (Note: Reviews: Fraser, Morag (13 January 2023). "Tom Keneally's sparkling new novel is a book for our times". The Sydney Morning Herald.; Sharrad, Paul (December 2022). "In Fanatic Heart, Tom Keneally revisits the tumultuous life of an Irish rebel". The Conversation.; McDonald, Ronan (27 December 2022). "Ronan McDonald reviews 'Fanatic Heart' by Tom Keneally". Australian Book Review.; Mayer, Erich (7 November 2022). "Book review: Fanatic Heart, Tom Keneally". ArtsHub Australia.; "At 87, Thomas Keneally isn't done with history yet". Australian Financial Review. 11 November 2022.)

The Monsarrat series, co-authored with Meg Keneally

- The Soldier's Curse (2016)
- The Unmourned (2017)
- The Power Game (2018)
- The Ink Stain (2019)

=== Non-fiction ===
- Outback (1983)
- Australia: Beyond the Dreamtime (1987)
- The Place Where Souls are Born: A Journey to the Southwest (1992)
- Now and in Time to Be: Ireland and the Irish (1992)
- Memoirs from a Young Republic (1993)
- The Utility Player: The Des Hasler Story (1993) Rugby league footballer Des Hasler
- Our Republic (1995)
- Homebush Boy: A Memoir (1995), autobiography
- The Great Shame (1998)
- "My father's Australia". Granta. 70: 331–349. Summer 2000.
- American Scoundrel: The Life of the Notorious Civil War General Dan Sickles (2002), biography of Daniel Sickles
- Lincoln (2003), biography of Abraham Lincoln
- The Commonwealth of Thieves: The Story of the Founding of Australia (2005)
- Searching for Schindler: A Memoir (2007)
- Australians: Origins to Eureka (2009)
- Three Famines: Starvation and Politics (2011)
- Australians: Eureka to the Diggers (2011)
- Australians: Flappers to Vietnam (2014)
- "Gutenberg fights on : a survival story". The National Library of Australia Magazine. 7 (1): 28–30. March 2015. Archived from the original on 22 June 2015. (Note: The fifth Ray Mathew Lecture, National Library of Australia, 4 September 2014.)
- Australians: A Short History (2016)
- A Bloody Good Rant: My Passions, Memories and Demons (2022)

=== Plays ===
- Halloran's Little Boat (1968)
- Childermas (1968)
- An Awful Rose (1972)
- Bullie's House (1981)
- Either Or (2007)

=== Screenplays ===
- The Survivor (1972)
- Silver City (1984)
- The Fremantle Conspiracy (1988)

———————
