= Catholic Institute of Sydney =

Theological college in Sydney, Australia

- University of Notre Dame Australia
- Location: Strathfield, Sydney, New South Wales, Australia
- Coordinates: 33.873327°S 151.083138°E
- Full name: Catholic Institute of Sydney for Theology and Ministry
- Abbreviation: CIS
- Established: 1954 – St Patrick's College, Manly (as EFT); 1996 – Strathfield (as CIS)
- Former names: Ecclesiastical Faculty of Theology (EFT); Facultas Theologica Sydneyensis (1954-1976)
- President: Professor Hayden Ramsay
- Website: cis.catholic.edu.au

The Catholic Institute of Sydney, a tertiary educational facility that is a Partner Institution of the University of Notre Dame Australia, delivers theological courses at both undergraduate and postgraduate level. The institute is located in Strathfield, in the inner western suburbs of Sydney, New South Wales, Australia.

In 1996 the Institute superseded St Patrick's College, Manly and St Columba's College, Springwood (itself earlier superseded in 1977) as the sole ecclesiastical theology faculty for the Catholic Church in Oceania. The Seminary of the Good Shepherd, located at Homebush, is the house of formation and prepares students who are studying for ordination to the priesthood in the Catholic Church.

In partnership with the University of Notre Dame Australia, Catholic Institute of Sydney offers: a Bachelor of Divinity, Master of Divinity, Graduate Certificate in the Practice of Ministry, Master of Theology, Master of Sacred Theology, and the Doctor of Theology. This is in addition to the ecclesiastical awards of Baccalaureate, Licentiate, and Doctorate of Sacred Theology.

== See also ==
- Roman Catholic Church in Australia
- St Patrick's College, Manly
