= 1956 in poetry =

Nationality words link to articles with information on the nation's poetry or literature (for instance, Irish or France).

== Events ==
- February 25 – English poet Ted Hughes and American poet Sylvia Plath meet in Cambridge, England.
- June 16 – Ted Hughes and Sylvia Plath marry at the church of St George the Martyr, Holborn, London and spend the night at his flat at 18 Rugby Street.
- September 6 – American poet Richard Eberhart, having been sent by The New York Times to San Francisco to report on the poetry scene there, publishes this day an article in the New York Times Book Review titled "West Coast Rhythms" which helps call national attention to Allen Ginsberg's Howl as "the most remarkable poem of the young group" of poets who are becoming known as the spokesmen of the Beat Generation. On November 1, Howl and Other Poems, is published by City Lights Bookstore.
- The Lake Eden campus of Black Mountain College, the birthplace of the Black Mountain School of poetry, closes, although classes do not end until the spring of 1957, and the final issue of the Black Mountain Review is published in the fall of 1957.
- Quadrant magazine is founded in Australia by Richard Krygier, a Polish-Jewish refugee who had been active in social-democrat politics in Europe, and James McAuley, a Catholic poet.
- Northern Review, founded in 1945 from the merger of two small Canadian literary magazines, Preview and First Statement, publishes its last issue.
- Tamarack Review founded by Robert Weaver in Canada

== Works published in English ==
Listed by nation where the work was first published and again by the poet's native land, if different; substantially revised works listed separately:

=== Australia ===
- James McAuley, A Vision of Ceremony
- Judith Wright, A Book of Australian Verse (edited)

=== Canada ===
- Leonard Cohen, Let Us Compare Mythologies, Canada
- R. A. D. Ford, A Window on the North
- Louis Dudek, The Transparent Sea. Toronto: Contact Press, 1956.
- Eldon Grier, Poems
- Irving Layton, The Bull Calf and Other Poems. Toronto: Contact Press.
- Irving Layton, The Improved Binoculars: Selected Poems. Introduction by William Carlos Williams. Highlands, NC: Jonathan Williams.
- Irving Layton, Music on a Kazoo. Toronto: Contact Press.
- W.W.E. Ross, Experiment 1923-1929, Contact Press.
- Raymond Souster, The Selected Poems. Louis Dudek ed. Toronto: Contact Press.
- Raymond Souster ed. Poets 56: Ten Younger English-Canadians. Toronto: Contact Press.
- Wilfred Watson, Even Your Right Eye

=== New Zealand ===
- Robert Chapman and Jonathan Bennett, editors, An Anthology of New Zealand Verse, Oxford University Press
- D'Arcy Cresswell, The Voyage of the Hurunui : a Ballad, Christchurch: Caxton Press
- Charles Doyle, A Splinter of Glass

=== India in English ===
- Einar Beer, Samadhi Poems and Autumn Rains ( Poetry in English ), Alvdal: The Brahmakul;
- Humayun Kabir, Mahatma & other Poems ( Poetry in English ),

=== United Kingdom ===
- Kingsley Amis, A Case of Samples: Poems 1946–1956
- Paul Dehn, For Love and Money
- J. P. Fletcher, Tally 300
- David Gascoyne, Night Thoughts
- John Holloway, The Minute and Longer Poems, Hessle, East Yorkshire: Marvell Press
- Christopher Logue, Devil, Maggot and Son
- Norman MacCaig, Riding Lights, London: Hogarth Press
- Edwin Muir, One Foot in Eden
- E. J. Scovell, The River Steamer, and Other Poems
- Fredegond Shove (died 1949), Poems

=== United States ===
- John Ashbery, Some Trees
- John Berryman, Homage to Mistress Bradstreet, New York: Farrar, Straus & Cudahy
- Gwendolyn Brooks, Bronzeville Boys and Girls
- Witter Bynner, A Book of Lyrics
- Robert Creeley, If You
- Kenneth Fearing, New and Selected Poems
- Robert Fitzgerald, In the Rose of Time: Poems 1931–1956
- Allen Ginsberg, Howl
- Anne Morrow Lindbergh, The Unicorn, and Other Poems
- W. S. Merwin, Green with Beasts, New York: Knopf (reprinted as part of The First Four Books of Poems, 1975)
- Kenneth Rexroth (translator), 30 Spanish Poems of Love and Exile and (translator), 100 Poems from the Chinese
- Edna St. Vincent Millay, Collected Poems
- Marianne Moore, Like a Bulwark
- Gertrude Stein, Stanzas in meditation and Other Poems (1929–1933)
- Peter Viereck, The Persimmon Tree
- John Hall Wheelock, Poems Old and New
- Reed Whittemore, An American Takes a Walk
- Richard Wilbur, Things of This World: Poems, New York: Harcourt, Brace
- Tennessee Williams, In the Winter of Cities

== Works published in other languages ==
Listed by language and often by nation where the work was first published and again by the poet's native land, if different; substantially revised works listed separately:

=== France ===
- Louis Aragon, Le Roman inachevé
- Aimé Césaire, Cahier d'un retour au pays natal, definitive, revised edition
- Pierre Jean Jouve, Lyrique
- Henri Michaux, Misérable miracle, about his experiences taking mescaline
- Jules Supervielle, L'Escalier
- Tristan Tzara, pen name of Sami Rosenstock, Le fruit permis

=== Germany ===
- W. Höllerer, editor, Transit, anthology, German
- Rupert Hirschenauer and Albrecht Weber, editors, Wege zum Gedicht, 2 volumes (second volume, on the ballad, in 1963), Germany, scholarship
- Walther Killy, Wandlungen des lyrischen Bildes

=== India ===
In each section, listed in alphabetical order by first name:

==== Dogri ====
- Dinu Bhai Pant, Dadi Te Mam
- Shambhu Nath Sharma, Bhadasa
- Shuk Dev Shastri, Svacchanda Trivani, verses celebrating traditional values and patterned on Sanskrit meters
- Tara Smail Puri, Fauji Pimsanar, a long poem on the plight of a military veteran

==== Gujarati ====
- Bhatt Damodar Kesavaji, pen name "Sudhansu", Alakhtano, Gujarati
- Dhirubhai Thaker, Arvacin Gujarati Shaityani Vikasrekha, a Gujarati-language history of that language's literature from 1850 to the post-independence period
- Natvarlal Kuberdas Pandya 'Ushnas', Nepathye, longer poems based on new interpretations of mythological characters; Gujarati
- Suresh Joshi, Upjati, Indian, Gujarati language

==== Kannada ====
- C. Mahadevappa, translation from the English of Percy Bysshe Shelley's The Defence of Poetry
- Channaveera Kanavi, Dipadhari, with some lyrics in the navodaya style, others in the navya; poetry known as Samanvaya Kavya in Kannada poetry because it attempted to synthesize the two types of subject matter: both the beauty of nature, folk traditions, mysticism, and humanism of the one form and the stark contemporary realism of the other
- Yarmunja Ramachandra, Vidaya, the author's only book of poems, published posthumously after his death at age 22

==== Malayalam ====
- O. N. V. Kurup, Dahikkunna Panapatram, Malayalam, the author's earliest poems, mostly lyrics reflecting revolutionary idealism
- Sreedhara Menon, Vittumkaikkottum, Malayalam
- Sukumar Azhikode, Ramananum Malayala Kavitayum, critical study in Malayalam of Changampuzha's Ramanan

==== Urdu ====
- Faiz Ahmad Faiz, Zindan Nama
- Mirza Muhammad Muqimi Bijapuri, Candar badan va Mahayar, edited by Muhammad Akbaruddin Siddiqi, narrative poems
- Nadim, "Subuhdam Yets Chhu Paratshyon Gashi-Tarukh", the first sonnet in the Kashmiri language; published in the Urdu publication Tameer

==== Other Indian languages ====
- Harekrushna Mahadab, Chayapathara Yatri, Oriya
- Kunvar Narayan (also spelled in English as Kunwar Narain), Cakravyuha (has also been transliterated into English as Chakravyooh), New Delhi: Radhakrishan Prakashan, ISBN 81-7119-192-4; Hindi-language
- Parsram Rohra, Sargam, Sindhi
- Sankha Ghosh, Dinguli Ratguli, the author's first book of poems, Bengali

=== Spanish language ===
- Mario Benedetti, Poemas de oficina ("Office Poems"), Uruguay
- José Santos Chocano, Las mejores poesías de Chocano, pról. de Francisco Bendezú (Lima: Editorial Paracas), Peru
- Juan Gelman, Violín y otras cuestiones, Argentina
- Octavio Paz, La estación violenta, Mexico

=== Other languages ===
- Guido Bedarida, Ebrei di Livorno in 180 sonetti giudaico-livornesi ("Jews of Livorno in 180 Judeo-Livornese sonnets"), Italy, in a Judeo-Italian dialect
- Miron Białoszewski's first book: Obroty rzeczy, Poland
- Zbigniew Herbert's first book: Struna światła, Poland
- Harry Martinson, Aniara, Swedish
- Eugenio Montale, La bufera e altro ("The Storm and Other Things"), a first edition of 1,000 copies, Venice: Neri Pozza; second, larger edition published in 1957, Milan: Arnaldo Mondadore Editore; Italy
- Nizar Qabbani, Poems (قصائد), Syrian poet writing in Arabic
- Yevgeny Yevtushenko, Stantsiia Zima (Станция Зима, "Zima Station", translated as "Winter Station"), Soviet Union

== Awards and honors ==
- Consultant in Poetry to the Library of Congress (later the post would be called "Poet Laureate Consultant in Poetry to the Library of Congress"): Randall Jarrell appointed this year.
- National Book Award for Poetry: W. H. Auden, The Shield of Achilles
- Pulitzer Prize for Poetry: Elizabeth Bishop: Poems - North & South
- Queen's Gold Medal for Poetry: Edmund Blunden
- Bollingen Prize: Conrad Aiken
- Fellowship of the Academy of American Poets: William Carlos Williams
- Adonais Prize (Spain): María C. Lacaci, Humana voz
- Australia: Grace Leven Prize for Poetry, James McAuley, A Vision of Ceremony
- Canada: Governor General's Award, poetry or drama: A Window on the North, Robert A.D. Ford

== Births ==
Death years link to the corresponding "[year] in poetry" article:

- January 1 – John O'Donohue (died 2008), Irish poet, author, priest, and philosopher
- January 21
  - Forrest Gander, American poet, essayist and translator
  - Ian McMillan, English poet
- March 11 – Jean "Binta" Breeze (died 2021), Jamaican dub poet
- April 7 – Dionisio D. Martinez, Cuban-born poet who grows up speaking Spanish, raised first in Spain, then in the United States
- May 9 – Henri Cole, Japanese-born American poet
- May 22 – Lucie Brock-Broido (died 2018), American poet
- August 15 – Henry Normal, born Pete Carroll, English performance poet and television comedy producer
- August 21 – Julia Darling (died 2005), English fiction writer, poet and dramatist
- September 26 – Mick Imlah (died 2009), Scottish-born poet
- October 7 – Diane Ackerman, American poet and naturalist
- October 30 – Annie Finch, American poet, librettist and theorist
- December 8 – Michael C. Burgess, English poet
- Also:
  - Bai Hua, Chinese poet
  - Jim Daniels, American poet, writer and academic
  - Amy Gerstler, American poet
  - Lachlan Mackinnon, Scottish-born poet and critic
  - Amir Or, Israeli poet

== Deaths ==
Birth years link to the corresponding "[year] in poetry" article:

- January 31 – A. A. Milne, 74 (born 1882), English author of children's books and children's poetry
- March 11 – Aleksanteri Aava, 72 (born 1883), Finnish poet
- March 23 – Mitsuko Shiga 四賀光子, pen name of Mitsu Ota (born 1885), Japanese, Taishō and Shōwa period tanka poet, a woman
- March 30 – Edmund Clerihew Bentley, 80 (born 1875), popular English novelist and humorist and inventor of the clerihew, an irregular form of humorous verse on biographical topics
- April 2 – Kōtarō Takamura 高村 光太郎 (born 1883), Japanese poet and sculptor; son of sculptor Takamura Kōun
- May 11 – Takashi Matsumoto 松本たかし (born 1906), Japanese, Shōwa period professional haiku poet in the Shippo-kai haiku circle, then, starting in 1929, in the Hototogisu group that also included Kawabata Bosha; founded a literary magazine, Fue ("Flute"), in 1946
- May 15 – Arthur Talmage Abernethy (born 1872), American poet, journalist, theologian, minister; North Carolina Poet Laureate 1948–53
- June 22 – Walter de la Mare, 83 (born 1873), English poet, short story writer and author of children's books
- July 7 – Gottfried Benn (born 1886), German expressionist poet; buried in Dahlem Waldfriedhof, Berlin
- July 8 – Giovanni Papini, 75 (born 1881), Italian poet, essayist, journalist, literary critic, and novelist
- July 11 – Dorothy Wellesley, 70, English socialite, author, poet and literary editor
- August 31 – Percy MacKaye, 81 (born 1875), American playwright and poet
- September 7 – Frank Oliver Call (born 1878), Canadian poet and academic
- November 21 – Aizu Yaichi (会津 八一) (born 1881), Japanese poet, calligrapher and historian (Surname: Aizu)
- December 10 – David Shimoni, 66, (born 1891), Israeli poet and writer

== See also ==
- Poetry
- List of poetry awards
- List of years in poetry
