= 1956 in Australian literature =

This article presents a list of the historical events and publications of Australian literature during 1956.

== Books ==
- Miles Franklin – Gentlemen at Gyang Gyang : A Tale of the Jumbuck Pads on the Summer Runs
- Nevil Shute – Beyond the Black Stump
- Randolph Stow – A Haunted Land
- Kylie Tennant – The Honey Flow
- F. J. Thwaites – That Was the Hour
- E. V. Timms – Shining Harvest
- Arthur Upfield – Man of Two Tribes
- F. B. Vickers – First Place to a Stranger
- Morris West
  - Gallows on the Sand
  - Kundu

== Short stories ==
- Ethel Anderson – At Parramatta
- Leon Gellert – Year After Year
- Alan Marshall – How's Andy Going?
- Katharine Susannah Prichard – "N'Goola"
- David Rowbotham – Town and City : Tales and Sketches
- Judith Wright – "The Vineyard Woman"

== Children's and Young Adult fiction ==
- Mavis Thorpe Clark – The Brown Land Was Green

== Poetry ==
- Bruce Beaver – "Cow Dance"
- David Campbell – The Miracle of Mullion Hill : Poems
- Rosemary Dobson – "Cock Crow"
- R. D. Fitzgerald – "This Night's Orbit"
- Mary Gilmore – "The Waradgery Tribe"
- Gwen Harwood – "The Old Wife's Tale"
- James McAuley
  - "Merry-Go-Round"
  - "Vespers"
  - A Vision of Ceremony
- Ronald McCuaig – "Betty by the Sea"
- J. S. Manifold – "Fife Tune"
- Vivian Smith
  - "For My Daughter"
  - The Other Meaning
- Douglas Stewart – "A Country Song"
- Judith Wright
  - A Book of Australian Verse (edited)
  - "The Forest"

== Biography ==
- Charmian Clift – Mermaid Singing
- Ion Idriess – The Silver City
- Jack Lang – I Remember
- Ruth Park & D'Arcy Niland – The Drums Go Bang!

== Awards and honours ==
=== Literary ===
Award	Author	Title	Publisher
ALS Gold Medal	Not awarded		

=== Children's and Young Adult ===
Award	Category	Author	Title	Publisher
Children's Book of the Year Award	Older Readers	Patricia Wrightson, illustrated by Margaret Horder	The Crooked Snake	Angus and Robertson
Children's Book of the Year Award	Picture Book	Peggy Barnard, illustrated by Sheila Hawkins	Wish and the Magic Nut	John Sands

=== Poetry ===
Award	Author	Title	Publisher
Grace Leven Prize for Poetry	James McAuley	A Vision of Ceremony	Angus & Robertson

== Births ==
A list, ordered by date of birth (and, if the date is either unspecified or repeated, ordered alphabetically by surname) of births in 1956 of Australian literary figures, authors of written works or literature-related individuals follows, including year of death.

- 9 January – Bill Leak, editorial and political cartoonist, caricaturist and portraitist (died 2017)
- 28 January – Tim Flannery, scientist and science writer
- 25 October – Kerry Reed-Gilbert, poet and author (died 2019)
- 5 November – Gig Ryan, poet

Unknown date

- Judith Beveridge, poet and editor
- Susan Johnson, novelist

== Deaths ==
A list, ordered by date of death (and, if the date is either unspecified or repeated, ordered alphabetically by surname) of deaths in 1956 of Australian literary figures, authors of written works or literature-related individuals follows, including year of birth.

- 3 March – Dale Collins, journalist and novelist (born 1897)
- 15 April – Jane Fletcher, poet, nature writer and children's writer (born 1870)
- 25 August – Lilian Turner, writer for children (born 1867)
- 20 September – Flora Eldershaw, novelist (born 1867)

== See also ==
- 1956 in Australia
- 1956 in literature
- 1956 in poetry
- List of years in Australian literature
- List of years in literature
