= 1977 in Australian literature =

This article presents a list of the historical events and publications of Australian literature during 1977.

== Events ==
- Ruth Park won the 1977 Miles Franklin Award for Swords and Crowns and Rings

== Major publications ==
=== Books ===
- Jon Cleary – High Road to China
- Sumner Locke Elliott – Water Under the Bridge
- Helen Garner – Monkey Grip
- Thomas Keneally – A Victim of the Aurora
- Colleen McCullough – The Thorn Birds
- Ruth Park – Swords and Crowns and Rings
- Amy Witting – The Visit

=== Short stories ===
- Frank Moorhouse – Tales of Mystery and Romance

=== Science fiction and fantasy ===
- A. Bertram Chandler
  - The Far Traveller
  - Star Courier
- Lee Harding – The Weeping Sky
- David Lake
  - The Right Hand of Dextra
  - The Wildings of Westron
- Cherry Wilder – The Luck of Brin's Five

=== Children's and young adult fiction ===
- Joan Phipson
  - Hide Till Daytime
  - Fly into Danger
- Eleanor Spence – A Candle for Saint Antony
- Patricia Wrightson – The Ice is Coming

=== Poetry ===
- Robert Adamson
  - Cross The Border
  - Selected Poems
- Graeme Curtis – At Last No Reply
- Nancy Keesing – Hails and Farewells
- Jennifer Maiden – Mortal Details
- Les Murray – Ethnic Radio
- John Tranter – Crying in Early Infancy: 100 Sonnets

=== Drama ===
- Dorothy Hewett – The Golden Oldies
- Louis Nowra – Inner Voices
- Patrick White – Big Toys
- David Williamson – The Club

=== Non-fiction ===
- Blanche d'Alpuget – Mediator: A Biography of Sir Richard Kirby
- Zelda D'Aprano – Zelda: The Becoming of a Woman
- Fred Daly – From Curtin to Kerr
- John Edwards – Life Wasn't Meant to Be Easy: A Political Profile of Malcolm Fraser
- Paul Hasluck – Mucking About: An Autobiography

== Awards and honours ==
=== Order of Australia ===
- Eleanor Dark appointed Officer of the Order of Australia (AO)
- Colin Thiele appointed Companion of the Order of Australia (AC)

=== Lifetime achievement ===
Award	Author
Christopher Brennan Award	Gwen Harwood
Patrick White Award	Sumner Locke Elliott

=== Literary ===
Award	Author	Title	Publisher
The Age Book of the Year Award	No award		
ALS Gold Medal	No award		
Colin Roderick Award	Alan Marshall	The Complete Stories of Alan Marshall	Thomas Nelson

=== Fiction ===
Award	Author	Title	Publisher
The Age Book of the Year Award	No award		
Miles Franklin Award	Ruth Park	Swords and Crowns and Rings	Nelson Books

=== Children and Young Adult ===
Award	Category	Author	Title	Publisher
Children's Book of the Year Award	Older Readers	Eleanor Spence	The October Child	Oxford University Press
Children's Book of the Year Award	Picture Book	No award		

=== Science fiction and fantasy ===
Award	Category	Author	Title	Publisher
Australian SF Achievement Award	Best Australian Science Fiction	David Lake	Walkers on the Sky	DAW Books

=== Poetry ===
Award	Author	Title	Publisher
Anne Elder Award	Laurie Duggan	East: Poems 1970-74	R. Kenny
Anne Elder Award	Graeme Curtis	At Last No Reply	Makar Press
Grace Leven Prize for Poetry	Robert Adamson	Selected Poems	Angus & Robertson

=== Drama ===
Award	Author	Title
AWGIE Award for Stage	Steve J. Spears	The Elocution of Benjamin Franklin

=== Non-fiction ===
Award	Author	Title	Publisher
The Age Book of the Year Award	No award		

== Births ==
A list, ordered by date of birth (and, if the date is either unspecified or repeated, ordered alphabetically by surname) of births in 1977 of Australian literary figures, authors of written works or literature-related individuals follows, including year of death.

- 7 August – Patrick Holland, novelist and short story writer

Unknown date

- Jennifer Mills – novelist, short story writer and poet

== Deaths ==
A list, ordered by date of death (and, if the date is either unspecified or repeated, ordered alphabetically by surname) of deaths in 1977 of Australian literary figures, authors of written works or literature-related individuals follows, including year of birth.

- 6 June – George Landen Dann, playwright (born 1904)
- 10 July – Alec Chisholm, journalist, ornithologist and encyclopaedist (born 1890)
- 22 August – Leon Gellert, poet (born 1892)
- 2 September – Pat Flower, playwright, television scriptwriter and crime novelist (born 1914)
- 12 September – Les Haylen, politician, playwright, novelist and journalist (born 1898)

== See also ==
- 1977 in Australia
- 1977 in literature
- 1977 in poetry
- List of years in Australian literature
- List of years in literature
