= 1971 in Australian literature =

This article presents a list of the historical events and publications of Australian literature during 1971.

== Events ==
- Ivan Southall becomes the first Australian author to win the Carnegie Medal for Writing.

== Major publications ==
=== Books ===
- Jon Cleary – Mask of the Andes
- Kenneth Cook – Piper in the Market-Place
- Dymphna Cusack – A Bough in Hell
- Frank Hardy – The Outcasts of Foolgarah
- Donald Horne – But What If There Are No Pelicans?
- David Ireland – The Unknown Industrial Prisoner
- George Johnston – A Cartload of Clay
- Thomas Keneally – A Dutiful Daughter
- Hal Porter – The Right Thing
- Judah Waten – So Far No Further
- Morris West – Summer of the Red Wolf

=== Short stories ===
- Elizabeth Jolley – "Bill Sprockett's Land"
- Hal Porter
  - "Brett"
  - Selected Stories

=== Children's and Young Adult fiction ===
- Hesba Brinsmead – Longtime Passing
- David Martin – Hughie
- Christobel Mattingley – Windmill at Magpie Creek
- Elyne Mitchell – Light Horse to Damascus
- Ivan Southall – Josh
- P. L. Travers – Friend Monkey

=== Science fiction and fantasy ===
- John Baxter – The Second Pacific Book of Science Fiction
- A. Bertram Chandler
  - Alternate Orbits
  - To Prime the Pump
- Lindsay Gutteridge – Cold War in a Country Garden
- Lee Harding – "Fallen Spaceman"
- Jack Wodhams – The Authentic Touch

=== Poetry ===
- Robert Adamson – The Rumour
- Bruce Dawe – Condolences of the Season : Selected Poems
- Gwen Harwood – "Oyster Cove"
- A. D. Hope – "Inscription for a War"
- James McAuley – Collected Poems 1936–1970
- Dorothea Mackellar – The Poems of Dorothea Mackellar
- Geoff Page – "Smalltown Memorials"
- David Rowbotham – The Pen of Feathers : Poems
- T. G. H. Strehlow – Songs of Central Australia (edited)
- Chris Wallace-Crabbe
  - "Other People"
  - Where the Wind Came : poems
- Judith Wright – Collected Poems, 1942-1970

=== Drama ===
- Alex Buzo – Macquarie : A Play
- Dorothy Hewett – The Chapel Perilous
- Ray Lawler – The Man Who Shot the Albatross
- Jim McNeil – The Chocolate Frog
- David Williamson
  - Don's Party
  - The Removalists

== Awards and honours ==
=== Literary ===
Award	Author	Title	Publisher
ALS Gold Medal	Colin Badger		
Colin Roderick Award	Geoffrey Serle	The Rush to be Rich	Melbourne University Press
Miles Franklin Award	David Ireland	The Unknown Industrial Prisoner	Angus and Robertson

=== Children and Young Adult ===
==== National ====
Award	Author	Title	Publisher
Carnegie Medal for Writing	Ivan Southall	Josh	Angus and Robertson

==== National ====
Award	Category	Author	Title	Publisher
Children's Book of the Year Award	Older Readers	Ivan Southall	Bread and Honey	Angus and Robertson
Children's Book of the Year Award	Picture Book	A. B. Paterson, illustrated by Desmond Digby	Waltzing Matilda	Collins

=== Science fiction and fantasy ===
Award	Category	Author	Title	Publisher
Australian SF Achievement Award	Best Australian Science Fiction	A. Bertram Chandler	"The Bitter Pill"	Vision of Tomorrow

=== Poetry ===
Award	Author	Title	Publisher
Grace Leven Prize for Poetry	Judith Wright	Collected Poems, 1942-1970	Angus and Robertson
Grace Leven Prize for Poetry	James McAuley	Collected Poems 1936–1970	Angus and Robertson

=== Drama ===
Award	Author	Title
AWGIE Award for Stage	Michael Boddy & Bob Ellis	The Legend of King O'Malley

== Births ==
A list, ordered by date of birth (and, if the date is either unspecified or repeated, ordered alphabetically by surname) of births in 1971 of Australian literary figures, authors of written works or literature-related individuals follows, including year of death.

- 18 November – Leigh Redhead, novelist

Unknown date

- Helen Dale (born Helen Darville), novelist
- Libby Hart, poet
- James Ley, literary critic and founder of the Sydney Review of Books
- John Mateer, poet and author (in South Africa)

== Deaths ==
A list, ordered by date of death (and, if the date is either unspecified or repeated, ordered alphabetically by surname) of deaths in 1971 of Australian literary figures, authors of written works or literature-related individuals follows, including year of birth.

- 19 January – Joe Walker, novelist and newspaper editor (born 1910)
- 3 February – Richard Harry Graves, poet and novelist (born 1897)
- 11 March – Frank Clune, novelist and travel writer (born 1893)
- 10 June – Maysie Coucher Greig, writer of romantic novels and thrillers (born 1901)
- 30 June – Kenneth Slessor, poet (born 1901)
- 11 September – Hilda Bridges, novelist and short story writer (born 1881)
- 7 November – Minnie Agnes Filson, poet (born 1898)

Unknown date

- G. C. Bleeck – novelist (born 1907)

== See also ==
- 1971 in Australia
- 1971 in literature
- 1971 in poetry
- List of years in Australian literature
- List of years in literature
