= 1906 in poetry =

This article covers 1906 in poetry. Nationality words link to articles with information on the nation's poetry or literature (for instance, Irish or France).

== Events ==
- Picasso's portrait of Gertrude Stein

== Works published in English ==
=== Canada ===
- Jean Blewett, The Cornflower and Other Poems
- Helena Coleman, Songs and Sonnets
- Sophia Almon Hensley, The Heart of a Woman.
- J. D. Logan, Preludes, Sonnets and Other Verses
- Duncan Campbell Scott, Via Borealis, Toronto: William Tyrrell & Co.
- Frederick George Scott, The Hymn of Empire, and Other Poems

=== United Kingdom ===
- 'Æ' (George William Russell), By Still Waters
- Joseph Campbell, The Rushlight
- John Davidson, Holiday, and Other Poems
- Walter de la Mare, Poems
- C. M. Doughty, The Dawn in Britain
- Thomas Hardy. The Dynasts, II
- Douglas Hyde, editor and translator into English from Gaelic, The Religious Songs of Connacht, Ireland
- Thomas MacDonagh, The Golden Joy, Irish poet published in Ireland
- Harold Monro, Poems
- Alfred Noyes:
  - Drake
  - "The Highwayman", a ballad
- Marguerite Antonia Radclyffe-Hall, 'Twixt Earth and Stars
- Arthur Symons, The Fool of the World, and Other Poems
- W. B. Yeats, Poems, 1899-1905, Irish poet published in the United Kingdom

=== United States ===
- Gelett Burgess, Are You a Bromide?
- William Ellery Leonard, Sonnets and Poems
- Horace L. Traubel, With Walt Whitman in Camden, five volumes, published from this year to 1964

=== Other in English ===
- W. F. Alexander and A. E. Currie, editors, New Zealand Verse, anthology
- W. B. Yeats, Poems, 1899-1905, Irish poet published in the United Kingdom

== Works published in other languages ==
=== France ===
- Francis Jammes:
  - Clairières dans le Ciel
  - L'Eglise habillée de feuilles
- Oscar Vladislas de Lubicz-Milosz, also known as O. V. de L. Milosz, Les Sept Solitudes

=== Other ===
- José Santos Chocano, Alma América, pról. de Miguel se Unamuno, Peru
- Amelia Denis de Icaza, "Al Cerro Ancón" ("Ancon Hill"), Panama
- Vera Figner, Stikhotvoreniia ("Poems"), Russia
- Alfred Garneau, Poésies, posthumously published; French language; Canada
- Marie Heiberg, Mure-lapse laulud ("Songs of a Problem Child"), Estonia
- Johannes V. Jensen, Digte, Denmark
- Mikhail Kuzmin, Alexandrian Songs, Russia
- Govardhanram N. Tripathi, Kavi Dayramno Aksharadeh, an appraisal of the works of poet Kavi Dayramno Aksharadeh (Indian, writing in Gujarati) (criticism)

== Births ==
Death years link to the corresponding "[year] in poetry" article:

- January 5 – Takashi Matsumoto 松本たかし(died 1956), Japanese Shōwa period professional haiku poet in the Shippo-kai haiku circle, then, starting in 1929, in the Hototogisu group also including Kawabata Bosha; founder of literary magazine, Fue ("Flute") in 1946
- January 6 – Eberhard Wolfgang Möller, (died 1972), German playwright and poet
- January 19 – Robin Hyde (suicide 1939), New Zealand
- February 22 – Humayun Kabir (died 1969) Bengali poet, educationist, politician, writer and philosopher
- April 13 – Samuel Beckett (died 1989), Irish poet, playwright and novelist, winner of the Nobel Prize in Literature in 1969
- May 10 – Robert Guy Howarth (died 1974), Australian scholar, literary critic and poet
- May 11 – Charles Tory Bruce (died 1971), Canadian writer
- May 17 – Frederic Prokosch (died 1989), American novelist, poet, memoirist and critic
- June 12 – Sandro Penna (died 1977), Italian
- June 22 – Anne Morrow Lindbergh (died 2001), American poet and wife of Charles Lindbergh
- June 27 – Vernon Watkins (died 1967), Welsh poet writing in English
- August 8 – Jesse Stuart (died 1984), American short story writer, poet and novelist
- August 28 – John Betjeman (died 1984), English poet laureate, writer and broadcaster
- September 2 – Ronald Bottrall (died 1989), English
- September 16 – Stanley Burnshaw (died 2005), American poet, critic, novelist, playwright, publisher, editor, translator and scholar
- September 20 – Ishizuka Tomoji 石塚友二 the kanji (Japanese writing) is a pen name of Ishizuka Tomoji, which is written with the different kanji 石塚友次, but in English there is no difference (died 1984), Japanese Shōwa period haiku poet and novelist
- September 27 – William Empson (died 1984), English literary critic and poet
- October 16 – Cleanth Brooks (died 1994) influential American literary critic and professor; author of Understanding Poetry
- November 12 – George Hill Dillon (died 1968), American poet and winner of the 1932 Pulitzer Prize in poetry
- November 23 (November 10 O.S.) – Betti Alver (died 1989), Estonia
- December 23 – Edasseri Govindan Nair (died 1974), Indian, Malayalam-language poet
- Also:
  - Ken Barratt, Australian poet and magazine editor
  - Mary Finnin, Australian
  - James Picot (died 1944), Australian
  - A. J. Wood, Australian

== Deaths ==
- February 9 – Paul Laurence Dunbar (born 1872), American
- February 27 – Colm de Bhailís (born 1796, sic.), Irish
- March 1 – Lettie S. Bigelow (born 1849), American
- March 31 – James McIntyre (born 1826), Canadian called "the Cheese Poet"
- date not known – Martha Griffith Browne, American abolitionist, novelist and poet

== See also ==
- 20th century in poetry
- 20th century in literature
- List of years in poetry
- List of years in literature
- French literature of the 20th century
- Silver Age of Russian Poetry
- Young Poland (Młoda Polska) a modernist period in Polish arts and literature, roughly from 1890 to 1918
- Poetry
