= 1971 in poetry =

Nationality words link to articles with information on the nation's poetry or literature (for instance, Irish or France).

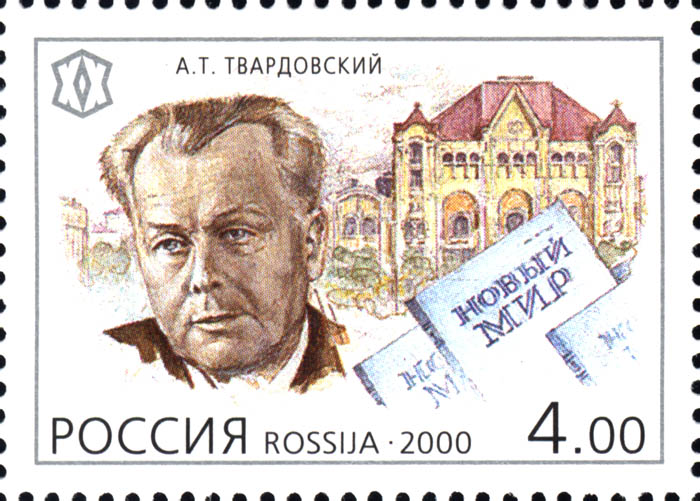
Aleksandr Tvardovsky, who died this year, was a Soviet poet who, as editor of Novy Mir, fought for more independence and published Alexandr Solzhenitsyn's One Day in the Life of Ivan Denisovich in 1962

== Events ==
- Winter — This magazine founded in the United States by Robert Grenier and Barrett Watten
- March – Cuban poet Herberto Padilla is arrested in Havana and released only after signing a confession stating he is a "vicious character" who took part in counterrevolutionary activities. A letter to Fidel Castro published May 20 in Paris from 60 leftist intellectuals, all supporters of the Cuban revolution, protests Padilla's treatment and accuses Castro of imposing Stalinism on Cuba. Among the 60: Jean-Paul Sartre, Simone de Beauvoir, Susan Sontag, Alberto Moravia, Carlos Fuentes, and Mario Vargas Llosa (who says he continues to support the Cuban revolution). Julio Cortázar of Argentina says he stands by Castro in a verse manifesto, Policrítica en la hora de los chacales
- April 8 – Release of Right On!, a film directed by Herbert Danska, of poetry recitations with bongo accompaniments on New York City streets
- April 21 – The 13th century Codex Regius is returned from Denmark to Iceland under naval escort.
- July 2 – Release of The Canterbury Tales, a film directed by Pier Paulo Pasolini, providing a soft-pornographic, controversial version of four tales by Geoffrey Chaucer
- Counter/measures magazine is founded in the United States by X. J. Kennedy and his wife, Dorothy. The magazine champions poetry written in traditional patterns and is an influence in the later creation of the New Formalism movement.

== Works published in English ==
Listed by nation where the work was first published and again by the poet's native land, if different; substantially revised works listed separately:

=== Australia ===
- James McAuley, Collected Poems 1936–1970
- Dorothea Mackellar, The Poems of Dorothea Mackellar
- Geoff Page and Philip Roberts, Two Poets, St Lucia: University of Queensland Press
- Chris Wallace-Crabbe
  - Editor: Australian Poetry 1971, anthology, Sydney: Angus & Robertson
  - "Other People"
  - Where the Wind Came, Sydney: Angus and Robertson
- Judith Wright, Collected Poems, 1942-1970

=== Canada ===
- Margaret Atwood, Power Politics
- bill bissett, Nobody Owns the Earth
- George Bowering, Touch: Selected Poems 1960–1970
- Louis Dudek, Collected Poetry. Montréal: Delta Canada.
- Northrop Frye, The Bush Garden (scholarship)
- John Glassco, Selected Poems. Toronto: Oxford University Press.
- Bill Howell, The Red Fox
- Irving Layton, The Collected Poems of Irving Layton. Toronto: McClelland and Stewart.
- Irving Layton, Nailpolish. Toronto: McClelland and Stewart.
- Kenneth Leslie, The Poems of Kenneth Leslie [ed. Sean Haldane.] Ladysmith, Quebec: Ladysmith Press.
- Richard Lewis, editor, I Breathe a New Song anthology of poems by Eskimos
- Dorothy Livesay:
  - Plainsongs. Fredericton, NB: Fiddlehead Poetry Books.
  - Plainsongs Extended. Fredericton, NB: Fiddlehead Poetry Books.
  - Disasters of the Sun. Burnaby, BC: Blackfish Press.
- Anne Marriott, Countries, Fredericton, NB: Fiddlehead Poetry Books.
- George McWhirter, Catalan Poems (winner of the 1972 Commonwealth Poetry Prize)
- Alden Nowlan, Between Tears and Laughter
- Michael Ondaatje, editor, The Broken Ark, animal verse; Ottawa: Oberon; revised as A Book of Beasts, 1979 (anthology) ISBN 0-88750-050-1
- Andreas Schroeder, File of Uncertainties, a chapbook (Sono Nis Press)
- Raymond Souster, The Years.Ottawa: Oberon Press.
- Phyllis Webb, Selected Poems 1954–65
- Dale Zieroth and four other poets, Mindscapes

=== India, in English ===
- Jayanta Mahapatra:
  - Close the Sky, Ten by Ten ( Poetry in English ), Calcutta: Dialogue Publications
  - Svayamvara and Other Poems ( Poetry in English ), Calcutta: Writers Workshop, India .
- Arvind Krishna Mehrotra, Pomes / Poemes / Poemas ( Poetry in English ),
- G. S. Sharat Chandra, April in Nanjangud ( Poetry in English ), London: London Magazine
- Michael Chacko Daniels, Split into Two ( Poetry in English ), Calcutta: Writers Workshop, India .
- Keki N. Daruwalla, Apparition in April ( Poetry in English ), Calcutta: Writers Workshop, India .
- Amaresh Datta, Captive Moments ( Poetry in English ), Calcutta: Writers Workshop, India
- Subhoranjan Das Gupta, Bodhisattva and Other Poems ( Poetry in English ), Calcutta: Writers Workshop, India .
- Gopal R. Honnalgere, A Wad of Poems, Calcutta: Writers Workshop, India
- Suniti Namjoshi:
  - More Poems ( Poetry in English ), Calcutta: Writers Workshop, India.
  - Cyclone in Pakistan ( Poetry in English ), Calcutta: Writers Workshop, India .
- Nolini Kanta Gupta, Collected Works, five volumes, published this year through 1976; Pondicherry: Sri Aurobindo Book Distribution Agency
- Subhas Chandra Saha, editor, Modern Indo-Anglian Love Poetry, anthology; Calcutta: Writers Workshop, India

=== New Zealand ===
- Fleur Adcock, High Tide in the Garden, London: Oxford University Press (New Zealand poet who moved to England in 1963)
- James K. Baxter, Jerusalem Daybook
- Bob Orr, Blue Footpaths
- Ian Wedde, Homage to Matisse

=== United Kingdom ===
- Fleur Adcock, High Tide in the Garden, New Zealand native living in and published in the United Kingdom
- George Barker, Poems of Places and People
- Frances Bellerby, Selected Poems
- George Mackay Brown
  - Fishermen with Ploughs
  - Poems New and Selected
- Tony Connor, In the Happy Valley
- John Cotton, Old Movies
- Maureen Duffy, Love Child
- Michael Ffinch, Voices Round a Star
- Veronica Forrest-Thomson, Language-Games
- Elaine Feinstein, The Magic Apple Tree, Hutchinson
- Robert Garioch, pen name of Robert Garioch Sutherland, The Big Music, and Other Poems
- Thom Gunn, Moly, with some poems written under the influence of LSD; others described the experience of taking it
- Adrian Henri, Autobiography
- Geoffrey Hill, Mercian Hymns, prose poems
- James Kirkup, The Body Servant
- Paul Muldoon, Knowing My Place, Northern Ireland native published in the United Kingdom
- Sylvia Plath, American poet published in the United Kingdom (posthumous):
  - Crossing the Water, published this year but containing poems written in 1960 and 1961
  - Winter Trees
- Jeremy Robson, editor, The Young British Poets anthology
- Vernon Scannell, Selected Poems
- Jon Silkin, Amana Grass
- Stephen Spender, The Generous Days
- Donald Ward, The Dead Snake
- Patricia Whittaker (poet), The Flying Men

=== United States ===
- Dick Allen, Anon and Various Time Machine Poems
- Maya Angelou, Just Give Me a Cool Drink of Water 'fore I Diiie
- Gwendolyn Brooks:
  - Black Steel: Joe Frazier and Muhammad Ali
  - The World of Gwendolyn Brooks
  - Aloneness
- Ted Berrigan and Anne Waldman, Memorial Day
- Ted Berrigan, Train Ride
- Paul Blackburn, The Journals: Blue Mounds Entries
- John Ciardi, Lives of X
- Cid Corman, Sun Rock Man (New Directions)
- Ed Dorn:
  - Spectrum Breakdown: A Microbook, Athanor Books
  - By the Sound, Frontier Press; republished with a new preface by the author, Black Sparrow Press, 1991
  - A Poem Called Alexander Hamilton, Tansy/Peg Leg Press
- Lawrence Ferlinghetti, Back Roads to Far Places (New Directions)
- Robert Fitzgerald, Spring Shade, collected poems and translations, 1931–1970 (New Directions)
- Donald S. Fryer, Songs and Sonnets Atlantean
- Michael S. Harper, History Is Your Own Heartbeat, won the Black Academy of Arts & Letters Award for poetry
- John Hollander, The Night Mirror
- Hugh Kenner, The Pound Era (University of California Press), Canadian writing and published in the United States; criticism
- Galway Kinnell, The Book of Nightmares
- Stanley Kunitz, The Testing Tree
- James McMichael, Against the Falling Evil
- Carl Rakosi, Ere-Voice
- Adrienne Rich, The Will to Change
- Richard Shelton, The Tattooed Desert
- Charles Simic, Dismantling the Silence
- Clark Ashton Smith, Selected Poems
- Richard Wilbur, translator, The School for Wives by Molière (in verse)
- James Wright, Collected Poems, including 30 new poems

=== Other in English ===
- Kofi Awoonor, Night of My Blood, Ghana
- John Figueroa, editor, Caribbean Voices, anthology, Evans Brothers, Caribbean
- Oswald Mbuyiseni Mtshali, Sounds of a Cowhide Drum, South Africa

== Works published in other languages ==
Listed by nation where the work was first published and again by the poet's native land, if different; substantially revised works listed separately:

=== Denmark ===
- Jørgen Leth, Eventyret om den sædvanlige udsigt
- Klaus Rifbjerg, Mytologi

=== French language ===
==== Canada, in French ====
- Jacques Brault, La Poésie ce matin (published in Paris)
- Raoul Duguay, L'Apokalypso
- Paul-Marie Lapointe, Le Réel absolu (Editions de l'Hexagone)
- Gilbert Langevin:
  - Ouvrir le feu
  - Stress
- Rina Lasnier, La Salle des rêves
- Olivier Marchand, Par Détresse et tendresse (Editions de l'Hexagone)
- Pierre Nepveu, Voies rapides, Montréal: HMH
- Claude Péloquin, Pour la Grandeur de l'Homme

==== France ====
- Anne-Marie Albiach, Etat
- M. Bataille, Le Cri dans le mur
- L. Bérimont, L'Évidence même
- Yves Bonnefoy, Traité du pianiste
- René Char:
  - L'Honneur devant Dieu
  - Le nu perdu ("Nakedness Lost")
- P. Damarix, L'Expérience magique
- Alain Delahaye, L'Eveil des traversees
- Jean Follain, Éspaces d'instants, the poet was killed in an accident days after publication
- Robert Marteau, Sibylles
- Francis Ponge, La Fabrique du Pré
- Jacques Roubaud, Octavio Paz, Charles Tomlinson and Edoardo Sanguineti, Renga

===== Anthologies =====
- J. L. Bédouin, editor, La Poésie Surréaliste
- Pierre Seghers, editor, La Poésie symboliste

=== Hebrew ===
- Leah Goldberg, Shearit ha-Chaim (posthumous)
- I. Efros, Shirim, collected poems
- D. Avidan, Shirim Hitzoniim
- Y. Amichai, Al Menat Lo Lizkor
- N. Yonatan, Shirim ba-Arov ha-Yam
- D. Pagis, Gilgul
- R. Adi, Mishaa le-Shaa
- A. Eldon, Levado ba-Zerem ha-Koved
- R. Shani, Shalom la-Adoni ha-Melech
- M. Meir, ha-Aretz Hahi Mitahat la-Mayim
- M. Oren, Adam Muad
- M. Megged, editor, Shirim Liriim, anthology of modern Hebrew poetry
- E. Silberschlag, Igrotai le-Dorot Aherim
- R. Avinoam, be-Misholai
- R. Lee, El Parvarai ha-Shemesh

=== Hungary ===
- György Petri, Magyarázatok M. számára

=== India ===
In each section, listed in alphabetical order by first name:

==== Assamese ====
- Hiren Bhattacharya, Mor Des Mor Premar Kavita ("Poems of My Country and of My Love"); Assamese language
- Nilmani Phookan; Assamese language:
  - Japani Kavita, Guwahati, Assam: Barua Book Agency, Assamese-language
  - Phuli Thaka Suryamukhi Phultor Pine ("Towards the Blooming Sunflower")

==== Other languages in India ====
- K. Satchidanandan, Malayalam-language:
  - Anchu Sooryan, ("Five Suns")
  - Kurukshetram, ("Studies in Modern Poetry"); scholarship
- Nirendranath Chakravarti, Ulongo Raja, Kolkata: Ananda Publishers; Bengali-language
- Udaya Narayana Singh, Amrtasya Putraah, Calcutta: Lok Sahitya Parishad, Maithili-language
- Vinod Kumar Shukla, Lagbhag Jai Hind, Sindhi: Ashok Vajpeyi; Hindi-language

=== Italy ===
- Attilio Bertolucci, Viaggio d'inverno ("Winter Voyage"), marking a change of style in the author's poetry
- Libero De Libero, Di brace in brace
- Eugenio Montale:
  - Satura (1962–1970) (published in January); Italy
  - Diario del '71 e del '72 (poetry) a private edition of 100 copies; a second, nonprivate edition was published in 1973; Italy

=== Norway ===
- Hans Borli, Isfuglen
- Alfred Hauge, Det evige sekund
- Peter R. Holm, Synslinjer
- Ernst Orvil, Dikt i utvalg
- Sigmund Skard, Popel ved flypass

=== Portuguese language ===
==== Brazil ====
- Joaquim Cardozo, De uma noite de festa
- Murilo Mendes, Convergência
- Henriqueta Lisboa, Nova lírica
- Manuel Bandeira, Meus pemas perferidos, a selection from previous books
- Foed Castro Chamma, O andarilho e a aurora
- Anderson Braga Horta, Altiplano

=== Spanish language ===
==== Latin America ====
- Delmira Agustini, Poesías completas, prólogue and notes by Manuel Alvar, posthumously published (died 1914), Barcelona: Editorial Labor, Uruguayan poet published in Spain
- Herberto Padilla, Por el momento, published before his arrest in Cuba (see Events above)
- Roberto Fernández Retamar, A quien pueda interesar (Cuba)
- José Lezama Lima, Poesía completa (Cuba)
- Ernesto Mejía Sánchez, Estelas/homenajes (Nicaragua)
- Carlos Solórzano, Las celdas (Guatemala)
- Five authors, including Agustín del Rosario, Poesía joven de Panamá
- M.L. Mendoza, Con él, conmigo, con nosotros tres

==== Spain ====
- Delmira Agustini, Poesías completas, prólogue and notes by Manuel Alvar, posthumously published (died 1914), Barcelona: Editorial Labor, Uruguayan poet published in Spain
- Vicente Aleixandre, Poesía superrealista
- Justo Jorge Padrón, Los oscuros fuegos
- José Angel Valente, Las palabras de la tribu, essays
- José María Valverde, Enseñanzas de la edad, 1945–70

=== Sweden ===
- Ylva Eggehorn, Ska vi dela
- Bo Setterlind, Himlen har landat
- Karl Vennberg, Sju ord pa tunnelbanan
- Lars Forssell, Oktober dikter ("October Poems")
- Gören Palm, Varför har nätterna inga namn?
- Kerstin Thorvall, Följetong i skärt och svart

=== Yiddish ===
- Broche Coodley, Not on Bread Alone
- Leon Kusman, Ballads of a Generation
- Beryl Segal, Poems for Children
- Meyer Stiker, Jewish Landscape, Volume 2
- M. M. Saffir, Creator of Various Dreams
- Menachem Stern, Songs at Midnight
- Rochelle Weprinski, The Only Star
- Aaron Zeitlin, Poems of Destruction and Faith
- Joseph Kerler, Song Between Teeth
- Jacob Sternberg, The Circle of Years

=== Other ===
- Simin Behbahani, Rastakhiz ("Resurrection"), Persia
- Paul Celan, Snow Part (Schneepart), German
- Odysseus Elytis, Ο ήλιος ο ηλιάτορας ("The Sovereign Sun"), Greece
- Alan Llwyd, Y March Hud ("The Magic Horse"), Welsh
- F. Pratz, Deutsche Gedichte von 1900 bis zur Gegenwart, anthology, German
- Ndoc Gjetja, Rrezatim ("Radiation"), his first book of poetry; Albania
- Seán Ó Ríordáin, Línte Liombó (Limbo Lines), Irish language in Ireland
- Siegbert Prawer, editor, Seventeen Modern German Poets, anthology published by Oxford University Press in the United Kingdom, poems in German
- Hans Verhagen, Duizenden zonsondergangen ("Thousands of sunsets"), Netherlands

== Awards and honors ==
- Nobel Prize in Literature: Pablo Neruda, Chilean poet and diplomat

=== Australia ===
- Grace Leven Prize for Poetry: Judith Wright, Collected Poems, 1942-1970 and James McAuley, Collected Poems 1936-1970

=== Canada ===
- See 1971 Governor General's Awards for a complete list of winners and finalists for those awards.

=== United Kingdom ===
- Alice Hunt Bartlett Prize: Geoffrey Hill, Mercian Hymns
- Cholmondeley Award: Charles Causley, Gavin Ewart, Hugo Williams
- Eric Gregory Award: Martin Booth, Florence Bull, John Pook, D. M. Warman, John Welch
- Queen's Gold Medal for Poetry: Stephen Spender
- First Whitbread Award for Poetry: Geoffrey Hill, Mercian Hymns

=== United States ===
- Consultant in Poetry to the Library of Congress (later the post would be called "Poet Laureate Consultant in Poetry to the Library of Congress"): Josephine Jacobsen appointed this year.
- Bollingen Prize: Richard Wilbur and Mona Van Duyn
- Frost Medal: Melville Cane
- National Book Award for Poetry: Mona Van Duyn, To See, To Take
- Pulitzer Prize for Poetry: William S. Merwin, The Carrier of Ladders
- Fellowship of the Academy of American Poets: James Wright

=== Elsewhere ===
- Goodman Fielder Wattie Book Award for Poetry: Rosemary Rolleston, William & Mary Rolleston

== Births ==
- January 16 – Damian and Jason Walford Davies, Welsh poets and academics
- January 31 – Santiago B. Villafania (died 2024), Filipino poet writing in Pangasinan and English
- June 28 – Sophie Hannah, English poet and novelist
- September 27 – Petrus Akkordeon, German poet
- October 18 – Jan Wagner, German poet
- November 18 – Terrance Hayes, American poet
- Matthew Hollis, English poet, literary biographer and editor

== Deaths ==
Birth years link to the corresponding "[year] in poetry" article:

- January 2 – E. V. Knox (born 1881), English poet and satirist
- May 9 – Ogden Nash, 68, American poet best known for writing pithy and funny light verse
- March 7 – Stevie Smith, 67, British poet and novelist, of a brain tumor
- March 9 – Jean Follain, French poet
- March 17 – Hiraide Shū 平出修 (born 1878), Japanese, late Meiji period novelist, poet, and lawyer; represented defendant in the High Treason Incident; a co-founder of the literary journal Subaru
- June 5 – Clifford Dyment (born 1914), British poet, literary critic and editor, and journalist
- June 6 – Edward Andrade (born 1887), English physicist and poet.
- June 13 – Hinatsu Kōnosuke 日夏耿之介, a pen-name of Higuchi Kunito (born 1890), Japanese, poet, editor and academic known for romantic and gothic poetry patterned after English literature; fervent Roman Catholic, co-founder, with Horiguchi Daigaku and Yaso Saijō, of Shijin ("Poets") magazine
- June 25 – Charles Vildrac, French poet and playwright
- July 3 – Jim Morrison, 27, American singer, songwriter, poet; best known as the lead singer and lyricist of The Doors
- July 13 – R. A. K. Mason (born 1905), New Zealand
- September (exact date not known) — Paul Blackburn, 44, American poet and translator, from esophageal cancer
- September 9 – Lenore G. Marshall, 72
- September 20 or September 21 (sources differ) – Giorgos Seferis, Greek poet and winner of a Nobel Prize for Literature
- October 10 – J. C. Beaglehole (born 1901), New Zealand historian and poet
- November 14 – Kyōsuke Kindaichi 金田一 京助 (born 1882), Japanese linguist and poet, father of linguist Haruhiko Kindaichi
- November 19 – Jacob Glatstein, 75, American Yiddish poet and critic
- November 25 – Andrew Young (born 1885), Scottish-born poet and clergyman
- December 14 – Munir Chowdhury also "Munier Chowdhury" (born 1925), Bengali educator, playwright, literary critic and political dissident
- December 18 – Aleksandr Tvardovsky, 61, Russian poet, editor of the official Soviet literary journal Novy Mir who fought hard to maintain its independence

== See also ==
- Poetry
- List of poetry awards
- List of years in poetry
