= Other People =

Other People may refer to:

- Other People (novel), by Martin Amis, 1981
- Other People (film), a 2016 American film
- Sleep Is Lovely, a lost 1968 British film also known as The Other People
- Other People, a 2001 short film produced by Vickie Gest
- "Other People", a song by Beach House from Bloom, 2012
- "Other People", a song by LP from Lost on You, 2016
- Other People, a 2017 album by English folk rock band The Rails
- "Other People (poem)", a 1971 poem by Australian poet Chris Wallace-Crabbe

== See also ==
- Hell Is Other People (disambiguation)
