= The Clean Dark =

1989 Australian poetry collection by Robert Adamson

- Author: Robert Adamson
- Language: English
- Genre: Poetry collection
- Publisher: Paper Bark Press
- Publication date: 1989
- Publication place: Australia
- Media type: Print
- Pages: 93 pp.
- Awards: 1990 New South Wales Premier's Literary Awards, winner; 1990 Victorian Premier's Literary Awards, winner

The Clean Dark is a collection of poems by Australian poet Robert Adamson, published by Paper Bark Press in Australia in 1989.

The collection contains 41 poems from a variety of sources.

== Contents ==
The poems in this collection are presented in four parts.

Part One: Re-Writing The Hawkesbury. includes epigraph: Je dis: une fleur! et, hors de l'oubli ou ma voix relegue aucun contour, en tant que quelque chose d'autre que les calices sus, musicalement se leve, idee meme et suave, l'absente de tous bouquets. Mallarme, Variations Sur Un Sujet.

Part Two: The Speaking Page. Includes Epigraphs: We spoke in words which sounded and then died away... But to create a material thing which could be used to give voice to the decree, what Word did you speak? Augustine, Confessions XI 6.

Part Three: Imagination, A Flame With Many Tongues. Includes Epigraph: Throw away the lights, the definitions, / And say of what you see in the dark. Wallace Stevens, The Man With The Blue Guitar.

Part Four: No River, No Death. Includes Epigraph: For so it is proper to find value / In a bleak skill. Geoffrey Hill, The Songbook of Sebastian Arrurruz.

=== Individual poems ===
- "Green Prawn Map" Section: Re-writing the Hawkesbury
- "The Channels" Section: Re-writing the Hawkesbury
- "Songs for Juno" Section: Re-writing the Hawkesbury
- "By No Man's Code : A Song Map : Prelude"Section: Part One: Re-Writing the Hawkesbury
- "By No Man's Code : A Song Map : The Trophy" Section: Part One: Re-Writing the Hawkesbury
- "By No Man's Code : A Song Map : Wild Colonial Boys" Section: Part One: Re-Writing the Hawkesbury
- "By No Man's Code : A Song Map : A Speaking Page"Section: Part One: Re-Writing the Hawkesbury
- "By No Man's Code : A Song Map : Full Tide" Section: Part One: Re-Writing the Hawkesbury
- "By No Man's Code : A Song Map : Fishing with My Stepson" Section: Part One: Re-Writing the Hawkesbury
- "By No Man's Code : A Song Map : Coda" Section: Part 1: Re-Writing the Hawkesbury
- "Gutting The Salmon" Section: Part 1: Re-Writing the Hawkesbury
- "Couplets" Section: Part 1: Re-Writing the Hawkesbury
- "The Speaking Page" Section: Part 2: The Speaking Page
- "Something Survives" Section: Part 2: The Speaking Page
- "Silva" Section: Part 2: The Speaking Page
- "The Difference Looking Back" Section: Part 2: The Speaking Page
- "Dreaming Up Mother" Section: Part 2: The Speaking Page
- "Remembering Posts" Section: Part 2: The Speaking Page
- "Angel's Own Kind : 1 : Ram Lives" Section: Part 2: The Speaking Page
- "Angel's Own Kind : 2 : Law of the Land" Section: Part 2: The Speaking Page
- "Angel's Own Kind : 3 : Last Rites" Section: Part 2: The Speaking Page
- "American Sonnet"Section: Part 2: The Speaking Page
- "Harriet Westbrook Looks at the Serpentine" Section: Part 2: The Speaking Page
- "Lady Faith" Section: Part 3: Imagination, a Flame with many Tongues
- "Drawn with Light" Section: Part 3: Imagination, a Flame with many Tongues
- "Imagination, a Flame with Many Tongues" Section: Part 3: Imagination, a Flame with many Tongues
- "An Elm Tree in Paddington" Section: Part 3: Imagination, A Flame with Many Tongues
- "Glenmore Road, A Nocturne" Section: Part 3: Imagination, A Flame with Many Tongues
- "Seven Days" Section: Part 3: Imagination, A Flame with Many Tongues
- "Clear Water Reckoning" Section: Part 3: Imagination, A Flame with Many Tongues
- "The Details Necessary" Section: Part 3: Imagination, A Flame with Many Tongues
- "No Memory, No Magic" Section: Part 3: Imagination, A Flame with Many Tongues
- "As Imperceptibly..." Section: Part 3: Imagination, A Flame with Many Tongues
- "Sonnets for Robert Duncan 1919-1988" Section: Part 3: Imagination, A Flame with Many Tongues
- "No River, No Death" Section: Part 4: No River, No Death
- "Phasing Out the Mangroves" Section: Part 4: No River, No Death
- "Blue Feathered Sonnet" Section: Part 4: No River, No Death
- "Farming the Oysters" Section: Part 4: No River, No Death
- "What's Slaughtered's Gone" Section: Part 4: No River, No Death
- "Canticle for the Bicentennial Dead" Section: Part 4: No River, No Death

== Critical reception ==
Writing in Australian Book Review critic Peter Craven noted that the poet's work "has always been a poetry of epiphanies in the face of nature, but a nature which was commingled with the play of language across the surface of a physical world apprehended as personal, physical, and violent." He went on: "The Clean Dark is as good a book of poetry as we have seen in ages. It has sweep without portent and colour without vulgarity."

In The Age newspaper, Graeme Kinross Smith described Robert Adamson as "leaning back from the language; unafraid of silences, gaps, incompleteness; necessarily manic, Whitman-esque, Thoreau-esque, in his possession of the Hawkesbury and its valley; writing poems that are like films re-reun; that come as if from dreams, that have whispering voices behind their words."

== Awards ==
- 1990 New South Wales Premier's Literary Awards, winner
- 1990 Victorian Premier's Literary Awards, winner

== See also ==
- 1989 in Australian literature

== Notes ==
- Dedication: For Juno - a new book for a new life.
- Epigraph: Two pictures of a rose in the dark. One is quite black; for the rose is invisible. In the other, it is painted in full detail and surrounded by black. Is one of them right, the other wrong? Don't we talk of a white rose in the dark and of a red rose in the dark? And don't we say for all that that they can't be distinguished in the dark? Ludwig Wittgenstein, Philosophical Investigations.
