= Takashi Matsumoto =

Takashi Matsumoto is the name of:

- Takashi Matsumoto (poet) (1906–1956)
- Takashi Matsumoto (lyricist) (born 1949)
