= Petra White =

Australian poet (born 1975)

- Born: Petra White; Adelaide, South Australia
- Occupations: Poet, public servant
- Writing career
- Period: 2000–present
- Notable awards: Grace Leven Prize for Poetry

Petra White is an Australian poet. White was born in Adelaide in 1975, the eldest of six children, and now lives in Berlin with her husband and daughter. Her first published collection of poetry, The Incoming Tide (John Leonard Press 2007), was shortlisted for the Queensland Premier's Literary Awards and the ACT Poetry Prize.

In 2011, five of White's poems were selected for inclusion in the landmark anthology, Australian Poetry Since 1788. The poems selected were Ricketts Point, Voyage, Woman and Dog, Older Sister, and Notes for the Time Being.

== Biography ==
Petra White grew up in Adelaide. She studied English and German literature at the University of Melbourne, completing a BA with honours. In 2002, she studied at Essen University and travelled in Europe. In 2008, she was Fellow of Hawthornden Castle International Retreat for Writers, completing a five-week residency.

In 2012, White and Paul Hetherington took Australian poetry to Ireland with Australian Poetry Limited's first international tour. White conducted readings and workshops at many venues throughout the Republic and Northern Ireland, including the Bealtaine Festival in Dublin, Laurel Villa in Magherafelt and Writers' Week at Listowel.

White's second collection, The Simplified World, published in 2010, was the joint winner of the Grace Leven Prize for Poetry. Her work has appeared in the anthology Take Five (Shoestring Press 2008, UK), The Age, Melbourne, and other anthologies and periodicals.

A third major collection, A Hunger, was published by John Leonard Press in 2014. This publication includes White's previous collections, in which slight changes have been made to a small number of poems.

In May 2017, White's fourth collection, Reading for a Quiet Morning, was published by GloriaSMH Press. It features a 'compact epic' inspired by the biblical story of Ezekiel, but with a twenty-first century, feminist perspective.

White was a founding co-editor of the So Long Bulletin, a blog on Australian poetry and criticism. She was the judge for the Reason-Brisbane Poetry Prize in 2011.

White holds a master's degree in Public Policy and Management from the University of Melbourne. In 2018, she moved to Europe, initially to London, then to Berlin, where she completed her fifth collection, titled Cities, published in 2021 by Sydney-based Vagabond Press.

Her sixth collection, That Galloping Horse, was published in January 2024 by UK-based Shearsman Books, at which time White was living and working in Belfast.

== Works ==
=== Critical reception ===
"With her unpretentious voice and subject matter, Petra draws the reader to her and absorbs them with tales of her multifaceted life."

'Sister', from The Incoming Tide, "is a lovely, almost comically surprising poem whose essential structure is that it is about sisterhood only in its title and its last two lines. As the poem progresses through four eight-line stanzas the gap between the title and the content of the poem grows more and more intense so that the conclusion is that much more satisfying:"

Descendant of the Aztec dog-god

Xolotl, who with mangled hands and feet

guided the dead to heaven, his once trans-

lucent form refuses catastrophe; more

than the ailing tabby, the timorous

and watchful high-heeled dog, or the rented

fireprone house, he guards our dangerous

childhood pledge to never change.

"It is one of those rare poems which is simultaneously sophisticated and easy to grasp: it should be immediately anthologized."

"In The Simplified World, Petra White more than fulfils the promise made by her first book, The Incoming Tide, back in 2007. For all of her literary sophistication and verbal ingenuity, White is a poet of the world as we know it, an observer of poignant situations – and a conveyor of them. Whether it’s an anonymous, depressed woman walking her dog (‘'not a small one'’) until its feet bleed and then carrying it ‘'all the way home, wherever that was'’, or a Lebanese couple running a take-away for decades, White over and over again leaves us moved by what she has shown us. As well as by poignancy, however, the book is held together by certain thematic threads. One is a feeling for depression, the strangeness of it, the way it cannot be lifted by a mere effort of will. It is a blankness as wide as the long sea (‘'St Kilda'’) and raises the question ‘'Where does illness live,/what does it want? . . . Describe your fear. How do you feel out of 10?/Out of 9?’’ (‘'Notes for the Time Being'’)."

And of Reading for a Quiet Morning:

"White’s mini-epic poem, 'How the Temple Was Built', which comprises the first half of her collection, reveals an authoritative voice delivering what feels like a Ted Hughes-inspired sermon on a new Ezekiel myth. The lens here, however, is distinctly female, the account feminist." "... these poems are lit up and muse-inspired, mini Ezekiels all in the face of baffling Gods."

"Petra White’s fourth poetry collection, Reading for a Quiet Morning, is a narrative-driven, subversive poetic experiment..." "Myths and religious script, alongside feminist and secular theory, are shown as one among many ways of interpreting the world, any promises of cosmic revelation always farcically, but no less tragically, limited. But there is resistance and strength within these attempts at sense-making that White subtly celebrates despite her critiques."

=== Poetry ===
- The Incoming Tide. (Melbourne: John Leonard Press, 2007)
- The Simplified World. (Melbourne: John Leonard Press, 2010)
- A Hunger. (Melbourne: John Leonard Press, 2014)
- Reading for a Quiet Morning. (Melbourne: GloriaSMH Press, 2017)
- Cities. (Sydney: Vagabond Press, 2021)
- That Galloping Horse. (Bristol: Shearsman Books Ltd, 2024)

=== Anthologies ===
- Best Australian Poems. (Melbourne: Black Inc., 2004, 2008, 2009, 2010, 2017)
- Take Five 08. (Nottingham: Shoestring Press, 2008)
- Best Australian Poetry. (Brisbane: University of Queensland Press, 2010)
- The Puncher and Wattman Anthology of Australian Poetry. (Sydney: Puncher & Wattmann, 2010)
- Australian Poetry Since 1788. Geoffrey Lehmann (ed.), Robert Gray (ed.) (Sydney: UNSW Press, 2011)
- Thirty Australian Poets. Felicity Plunkett (ed.) (Brisbane: University of Queensland Press, 2011)
- Young Poets: An Australian Anthology. (Melbourne: John Leonard Press, 2011)

== Awards ==
- 2010: Grace Leven Prize for Poetry for The Simplified World
- 2018: Victorian Premier's Literary Awards (Highly commended)
- 2024: Judith Wright Calanthe Award, Queensland Literary Awards, shortlisted for That Galloping Horse
- 2025: Prime Minister's Literary Awards, Poetry prize, shortlisted for That Galloping Horse
