= Hell Is Other People =

Hell Is Other People may refer to:

- "Hell is other people", a quotation from the 1944 play No Exit by Jean-Paul Sartre
- Hell Is Other People (TV series), a 2019 South Korean TV series
- "Hell Is Other People" (The Vampire Diaries), a 2016 episode of The Vampire Diaries
- "Hell Is Other People", a 2002 episode of The Chris Isaak Show
- Hell Is Other People, a 1995 EP by Guapo
- Hell Is Other People, a 1997 studio album by Dynamite Boy
- "Hell Is Other People", a 2002 song by Jonas Hellborg from the album Personae

== See also ==
- "O Inferno São Os Outros", a 2005 song by Brazilian rock band Titãs
- "Help Is Other People", a 2019 episode of The Good Place
- Other People
