= Collected Poems 1936–1970 =

1971 poetry collection by James McAuley

- Author: James McAuley
- Language: English
- Genre: Poetry collection
- Publisher: Angus and Robertson
- Publication date: 1971
- Publication place: Australia
- Media type: Print
- Pages: 232 pp.
- Awards: 1971 Grace Leven Prize for Poetry, joint winner

Collected Poems 1936–1970 is a poetry collection by Australian poet James McAuley, published by Angus and Robertson in Australia in 1971.

The collection contains 147 poems from a variety of sources.

This volume includes poems from four of the poet's collections: Under Aldebaran, A Vision of Ceremony, Captain Quiros, and Surprises of the Sun, as well as including 23 poems published in book form for the first time.

The collection won the 1971 Grace Leven Prize for Poetry.

== Contents ==
- "When Shall the Fair"
- "Monologue"
- "She Like the Moon Arises"
- "Autumn"
- "At Bungendore"
- "Envoi for a Book of Poems"
- "Gnostic Prelude"
- "The Blue Horses"
- "Dialogue"
- "The Family of Love : I : Proem"
- "The Family of Love : II : Song of Shem"
- "The Family of Love : III : Plumb"
- "The Family of Love : IV : the Tramguard's Song"
- "The Family of Love : V : the Voices in the Room"
- "The Family of Love : VI : the Family Reunion"
- "Evening Chorale"
- "Landscape of Lust"
- "Sleep"
- "Terra Australis"
- "Latona"
- "The Woman in the House"
- "Ballade of Lost Phrases"
- "Revenant"
- "Jesus"
- "New Guinea Lament"
- "Henry the Navigator"
- "The Incarnation of Sirius"
- "Missa Papae Marcelli"
- "Chorale"
- "The Muse"
- "Absence"
- "Jindyworobaksheesh"
- "The True Discovery of Australia (Dedicated To A.D. Hope)"
- "Celebration of Love"
- "O Clear Day"
- "Marginal Note"
- The Hero and the Hydra, poetry sequence
  - "Philoctetes"
  - "Prometheus : A Secular Masque"
  - "The Death of Chiron"
  - "The Ascent of Heracles"
  - "The Tomb of Heracles"
- "Invocation"
- "At Dawn"
- "Memorial"
- "Mating Swans"
- "Tune for Swans"
- "Flight"
- "To a Dead Bird of Paradise"
- "Canticle"
- "To the Holy Spirit"
- "Nativity"
- "An Art of Poetry"
- "Palm"
- "Prefiguration"
- "Celebration of Divine Love"
- "A Leaf of Sage"
- "New Guinea"
- "Meditation (from Hugo von Hofmannsthal)"
- "The Royal Fireworks"
- "The Middle of Life (from Friedrich Holderlin)"
- "Vespers"
- "Late Winter"
- "Magpie"
- "To Any Poet"
- "A Letter to John Dryden"
- "Waking Song"
- "Cantilena"
- "Solemnity"
- "Merry-Go-Round"
- "Secret Song"
- "To One Alone"
- "Aubade"
- "Warning"
- "Exploit"
- "Nuptial Hymn"
- "Winter Nightfall (from Georg Trakl)"
- "New Spring"
- "Nocturnal"
- "In a Late Hour"
- "Valediction: Roy Campbell"
- "The Inception of the Poem "
- "Captain Quiros : A Poem"
- "Time Out of Mind"
- "Pieta"
- "St John's Park, New Town"
- "One Thing at Least"
- "Father, Mother, Son"
- "Legendary"
- "Marine"
- The Seven Days of Creation, poetry sequence
  - "The First Day"
  - "The Second Day"
  - "The Third Day"
  - "The Fourth Day"
  - "The Fifth Day"
  - "The Sixth Day"
  - "The Seventh Day"
- "The Exile"
- "Autumn Ode"
- "Holiday"
- "The Cloak"
- "Tapestry"
- "Summer's Close"
- "Girl Gathering Roses"
- "Confession"
- "Credo"
- "Liberal or Innocent by Definition"
- "The Convict and the Lady : An Incident in St George's Church, Battery Point"
- "In Regard to T.S. Eliot"
- "Released on Parole"
- "Against the Dark"
- "A Wedding Piece : As Milton Might have Handled the Union of the Redcross Knight and Una at the End of Book One of 'The Faerie Queene'"
- "In the Twentieth Century"
- "Numbers and Makes"
- "One Tuesday in Summer"
- "Because"
- "Wistaria"
- "Tabletalk"
- "Soundings"
- "Self-Portrait, Newcastle, 1942..."
- "20th June, 1942"
- "Catherine Hill Bay 1942"
- "Vale"
- "In the Huon Valley"
- "A Plot Unmasked"
- "Keep the Season"
- "August Weather"
- "Spider on the Snow"
- "Tailings"
- "Flowering Lily"
- "At Penstock Lagoon"
- "Anonymous Message"
- "The Garden"
- "The Hazard and the Gift"
- "Hockey at the Sportsfield"
- "Convalescence"
- "Blessing of Women : From Georg Trakl"
- "Late Sunday Afternoon"
- "Starlings"
- "St. John's Park"
- "Wet Day"
- "At Rushy Lagoon"
- "Sickroom"
- "Spring Song"
- "Pastoral"
- "Childhood Morning - Homebush"
- "In Aeternum"
- "Plein-Air"

== Critical reception ==
In his review of the collection for The Sydney Morning Herald reviewer Barry Andrews noted of McAuley that his "poetry moves through several stages. We see reflected the tensions of the war years in the early poems; in the middle poems a belief in stoicism is affirmed; in the poems written after his conversion to Catholicism in 1952 – some deal explicitly with that conversion – we see explored (and affirmed) his vision of the universe, as a place of order."

R. A. Simpson, writing about the book for The Age newspaper, commented that McAuley "is fundamentally a writer with a romantic vision." Simpson does go on to note that "McAuley's seriousness and pursuit of principles have lead him into some banalities."

== Awards ==
- 1971 Grace Leven Prize for Poetry, winner

== See also ==
- 1971 in Australian literature
