= The Last Foot =

1951 Australian radio play

- Genre: drama play
- Running time: 60 mins (8:30 am – 9:30 am)
- Country of origin: Australia
- Language: English
- Syndicates: ABC
- Starring: John Nugent Hayward
- Written by: F. B. Vickers
- Directed by: Alexander Turner
- Recording studio: Perth
- Original release: January 14, 1951

The Last Foot is an Australian radio play by F. B. Vickers. It was produced in Perth for the ABC's Jubilee Celebration.

According to Leslie Rees, the play was one of the most highly regarded Australian radio plays of the 1950s that came from Perth.

== Premise ==
A young prospector and his Italian friend strike what looks like a promising lead but the prospector falls in love at the same time.
