= Selected Poems (Adamson collection) =

1977 poetry collection by Robert Adamson

- Author: Robert Adamson
- Language: English
- Genre: Poetry collection
- Publisher: Angus and Robertson
- Publication date: 1977
- Publication place: Australia
- Media type: Print
- Pages: 152 pp.
- Awards: 1977 Grace Leven Prize for Poetry, winner
- ISBN: 0207135150

Selected Poems is a collection of poems by Australian poet Robert Adamson, published by Angus and Robertson in Australia in 1977.

The collection contains 83 poems from a variety of sources, with some published here for the first time.

The collection won the 1977 Grace Leven Prize for Poetry.

== Contents ==
- "The Rebel Angel (for Michael Driscoll)"
- "Action Would Kill It / A Gamble"
- "Keep Shooting"
- "The Imitator"
- "Envoi"
- "Canticles on the Skin"
- "Passing Through Experiences"
- "Comes From Inside"
- "The Beautiful Season"
- "Some More Experiences"
- "Sonnets to Be Written from Prison"
- "Blown Glass and Picture Tube"
- "Towards Abstraction/Possibly a Gull's Wing"
- "Guns Sounding at Dawn"
- "Card Tables Covered with Dice"
- "The Domesticity"
- "Your Magazine Husband"
- "Ode to Denise"
- "Never Seek to Tell"
- "4 am (Shall We Always Be Waiting)"
- "When Soft Voices Die"
- "A Wind Without Flags"
- "A Poet Surrounded by Her Death"
- "Elegy for Bob Dylan's Dream"
- "The Wonder"
- "Envoi ([Go Book])"
- "The White Feather"
- "Afterthoughts (Making the Elegy)"
- "The Thoughtless Shore : 1 (for Michael Dransfield)"
- "Elegy for Imitation Glass"
- "Between the Silver and the Glass"
- "Seven Odes to Themselves"
- "Getting Further Away"
- "'Apres Moi le Sommeil'"
- "[Untitled]"
- "Under the Junipers (Teenage Lightning)"
- "The Final Solstice"
- "Mondrian : Light Breaks Upon the Grail"
- "Prospero Coming Out of Himself"
- "Shale Mountain Myth (for Denise)"
- "Sibyl"
- "Things Going Out of My Life"
- "Sail Away"
- "Berowra Waters"
- "The Harbour Braces Itself"
- "The Mullet Run 1"
- "The Glorious Lie : The Mullet Run"
- "The Crossing"
- The Shining Incidents
  - "The Ghost Crabs"
  - "The Night Parrots"
  - "Drifting Through Silence"
  - "A New Legend"
- "The Glorious Lie : Into the Dark Air by River Light, Full Moon and High Tide"
- "Out of Time and The Self's Dark Ring in Radiant Twilight"
- "She Moves the Sea The River"
- "The Glorious Lie : Some Notes About the River"
- "Sunlight, Moonlight"
- "The Glorious Lie : The Ribbon-Fish"
- "The Glorious Lie : Dead Horse Bay"
- "The Glorious Lie : The Nankeen Kestrels"
- "The Revelation"
- "Gulls, Catfish"
- "A Wind Without Flags (Wade in the Water)"
- "Sentimentality is a Failure of Feeling"
- "The Act of Dedication : Lovesong from Across the Border"
- "The Act of Dedication : Fallen Among Enemies (for Bruce Beaver)"
- "The Act of Dedication : Just Imagine the Hours We Spend"
- "The Act of Dedication : Some Phrases, A Love Story for Tranter"
- "The Act of Dedication : The Stranger's Song"
- "The Act of Dedication : Lovesong to Robert Creeley"
- "The Act of Dedication : Come Through the Glass Sally (for Dorothy Hewett)"
- "The Glorious Lie : A Curse"
- "Saint Augustine (for Les Murray)"
- The Grail Poems
  - "The Act of Dedication"
  - "The Grail Poems : The Quest"
  - "The Grail Poems : Merlin"
  - "The Grail Poems : Guinevere"
  - "The Grail Poems : Gawain"
  - "The Grail Poems : Knight and Lady"
  - "The Grail Poems : Lancelot"
  - "The Grail Poems : The Stone"
  - "The Grail Poems : Camelot"
  - "The Grail Poems : The Graal"

== Critical reception ==
Reviewing the collection for The Sydney Morning Herald poet and critic Robert Gray noted that he found the poet's main quality was "evasiveness", going on to explain that the "style is slippery, vague and imprecise." Gray concluded his review stating the poems are "imaginatively transformed, but coming out of life they borrow something consistent and substantial from natural objects."

== See also ==
- 1977 in Australian literature
