= Swords and Crowns and Rings =

1977 novel by Ruth Park

- First edition
- Author: Ruth Park
- Language: English
- Genre: Novel
- Publisher: Nelson, Australia
- Publication date: 1977
- Publication place: Australia
- Media type: Print (hardback and paperback)
- Pages: 435
- ISBN: 0-17-005204-4
- OCLC: 4498430
- Dewey Decimal: 823
- LC Class: PZ3.P2206 Sw PR9639.3.P37
- Preceded by: One-a-Pecker, Two-a-Pecker
- Followed by: Missus

Swords and Crowns and Rings (1977) is a Miles Franklin Award-winning novel by Australian author Ruth Park.

== Synopsis ==
It mainly follows the stories of two children in a town in rural New South Wales across three decades at the start of the 20th century.

The primary protagonist, Jackie Hanna, is born a "dwarf" in 1907 to Walter and Peggy Hanna, two grocers in Kingsland, NSW. Jackie's father Walter dies during his childhood, and his mother remarries to a veteran of the Boer War. The secondary protagonist, Dorothy "Cushie" Moy, is born to a wealthy family; her father is a banker and her mother the daughter of a newspaper tycoon. In their youth, the two protagonists fall in love, and much of the book arcs around the circumstances and misfortunes that keep them apart. In particular, a substantial portion of the book focuses on Jackie's experiences as a migrant worker through the Great Depression in Australia, including interactions with New South Wales Premier Jack Lang.

The book is divided into six chapters: 1. Jackie Hanna, Cushie Moy 1907–1918 2. Jackie Hanna 1924 3. Cushie Moy 1924–1925 4. Jackie Hanna 1924–1929 5. Jackie Hanna 1931 6. Jackie Hanna, Cushie Moy 1931–1932

== Critical reception ==
Hope Hewitt in The Canberra Times was not overly impressed: "The symbols tinkle cornily over every page, not just swords and crowns and rings, but dwarfs and clocks and gold and many more, all familiar. The language is heavy with adjectives and cliches, and at no point does a distinctive voice emerge from this syruped version of Sydney in the bad old days."

== Awards ==
- Miles Franklin Award 1977, winner
- National Book Council Award for Australian Literature 1978, highly commended

== See also ==
- 1977 in Australian literature
