= Martin Krygier =

Australian academic

Martin Krygier AM FASSA
- Born: 1949 (age 76–77); Sydney, Australia

Academic work
- Institutions: University of New South Wales

Martin Evald John Krygier AM FASSA, (born 1949) is an Australian academic.

== Education ==
Krygier obtained BA and LLB degrees at the University of Sydney and a PhD in the History of Ideas at the Australian National University.

== Career ==
Krygier taught in the Department of Jurisprudence at University of Sydney Law school, before joining the Faculty of Law (now Faculty of Law and Justice) in the University of New South Wales. He was appointed the Gordon Samuels Professor of Law and Social Theory in 2009.

He is the author of Tempering Power. Beyond the Rule of Law (2026), Philip Selznick: Ideals in the World (2012), and Civil Passions (2005). He is also an editor of Anti-Constitutional Populism (2022), Spreading Democracy and the Rule of Law? (2006), Rethinking the Rule of Law after Communism (2005), The Rule of Law after Communism (1999), Marxism and Communism (1994), and Bureaucracy: The Career of a Concept (1980). He was awarded the 2016 Dennis Leslie Mahoney Prize in Legal Theory.

In 1997, Krygier delivered the annual series of Australian Broadcasting Corporation Boyer Lectures on "Between Fear and Hope: Hybrid Thoughts on Public Views".

== Personal ==
Martin Krygier born 1949 in Sydney, is the son of Richard Krygier and Roma Halpern.

== Honours and awards ==
- 2002 Elected Fellow of the Academy of the Social Sciences in Australia
- 2002 Cavalier's Cross, Order of Merit of the Republic of Poland
- 2016 Dennis Leslie Mahoney Prize
- 2020 Member of the Order of Australia for "significant service to legal education, and to professional associations"
