= Juno Gemes =

Australian photographer (born 1944)

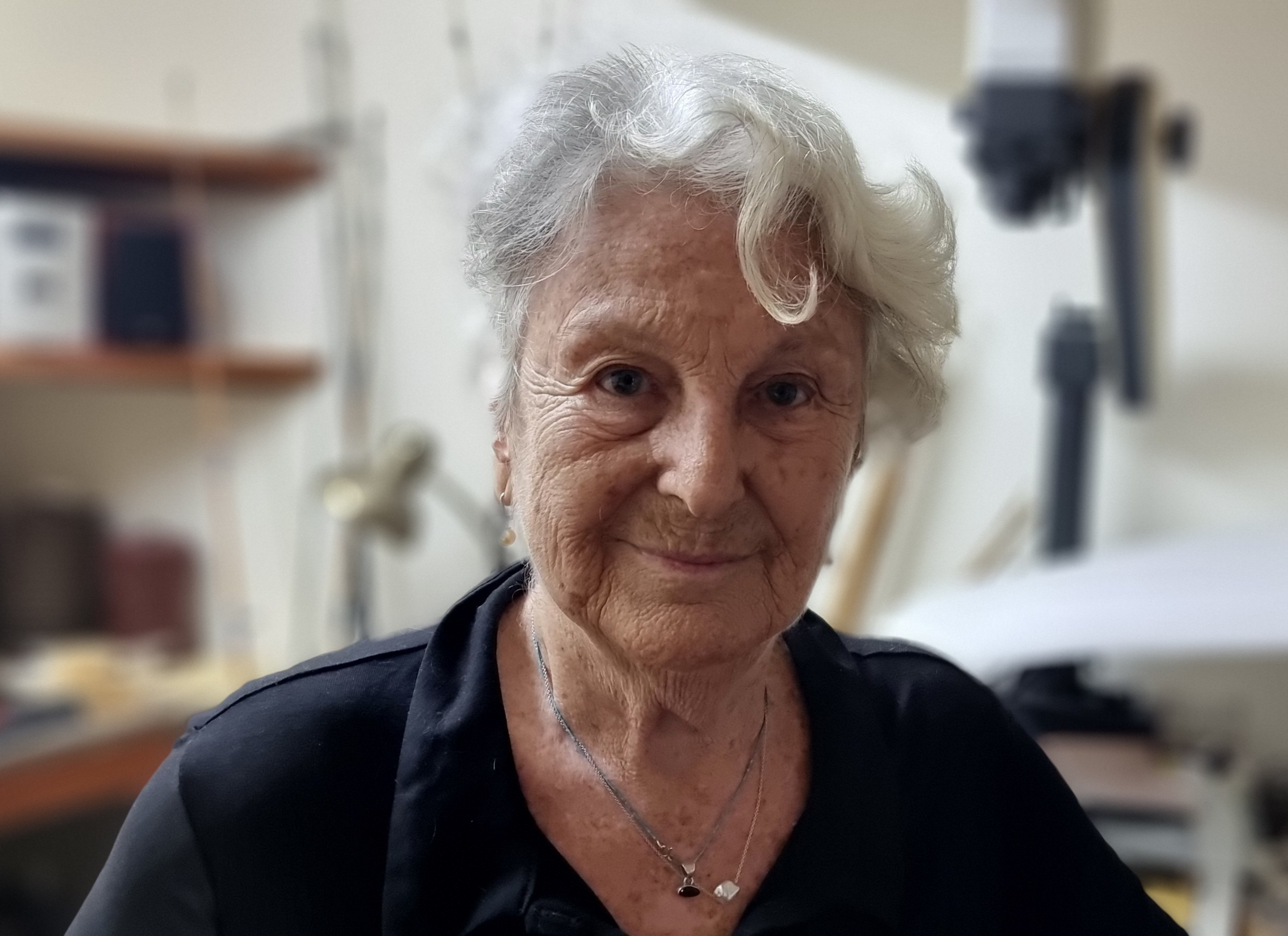
- Gemes in 2025
- Born: 1944 (age 81–82); Budapest, Hungary
- Education: University of Sydney; National Institute of Dramatic Art
- Occupation: Photographer
- Known for: Photographs depicting cultural and political struggle of Indigenous Peoples in Australia
- Partner: Robert Adamson
- Parents: Alex Gemes (father); Lucy (mother)

Juno Gemes (born 1944) is a Hungarian-born Australian activist and photographer, best known for her photography of Aboriginal Australians. A performer, theatre director, writer and publisher, Gemes was one of the founders of Australia's first experimental theatre group The Human Body.

== Early life ==
Juno Gemes was born in 1944 in Budapest, Hungary, emigrating to Australia with her parents Alex and Lucy Gemes in 1949.

== Career ==
=== Theatre ===
Gemes studied at the University of Sydney and the National Institute of Dramatic Art (NIDA) and graduated in 1964. In 1968 Gemes directed The Human Body Australia's first experimental theatre group, established with Johnny Allen and Clem Gorman. Some of The Human Body Performances at the Powerhouse warehouse in Haymarket featured a geodesic light dome built by Jacky Joy Jacobson and Michael Glasheen from 5,000 light bulbs. Gemes worked in theatre and film, and in the late 1960s and 1970s worked sporadically in London, where she wrote for the London-based underground newspaper International Times. While in London, Gemes performed in some of Yoko Ono's work including the avant-garde film Bottoms and a performance piece The scream at the Perfumed Garden.

=== Photography ===
Gemes began exhibiting her photography in Australia in 1966, and held her first solo exhibition, We Wait No More, in 1982. In 1971, Gemes became involved with the Yellow House Artist Collective in Potts Point, Sydney. Collaborating with another member of the Collective, landscape artist Mick Glasheen, to document traditional stories about Uluru. They stayed in the Central Desert for six months in a geodesic dome seeking out the Pitjantjara elders in the area.

Gemes is known for her photographs depicting the cultural and political struggle of indigenous peoples in Australia, including land rights, the handing back of Uluru to the traditional owners, and the National Apology to the Stolen Generations in the Federal Parliament. Gemes describes Nothing Personal by James Baldwin and Richard Avedon, which examines American culture including civil rights and the rise of black nationalism, as an early influence in her work. In 1976, Gemes photographed American civil rights leader James Baldwin on the rooftop of the Athenaeum Hotel in London.

Under Another Sky, Juno Gemes Photography 1968–1988, a survey of Gemes work from more than twenty years, was exhibited in Budapest and Paris in the late 1980s.

In 2018, Gemes told The Sydney Morning Herald her reason for taking up photography: "It was because I saw that Aboriginal people were invisible that I took up the camera." Much of her work has documented the Aboriginal rights and land rights movements, from the Aboriginal Tent Embassy to 2008 when she was one of ten photographers selected to officially document the Apology to Australia's Indigenous peoples.

Gemes has thirty works in the collection of the National Portrait Gallery in Australia. Her papers are held at the National Library of Australia and the Mitchell Library of the State Library of New South Wales.

=== Publishing ===
In 1986, Gemes and her partner Australian poet Robert Adamson co-founded, with writer Michael Wilding, independent publishing company Paper Bark Press (sometimes spelt Paperbark), which published Australian poetry. Wilding left the company in 1990, and Gemes and Adamson continued to run the company until 2002.

In 1997, Adamson and Gemes collaborated on the publication The Language of Oysters.

In January 2025, Gemes published Until Justice Comes: Fifty Years of The Movement for Indigenous Rights. PHOTOGRAPHS 1970 - 2024, through Upswell Press.

== Personal life ==
Gemes' son, Orlando Gemes, born in London in 1975, is pictured with Essie Coffey OAM in a portrait at the National Portrait Gallery. He travelled with his mother as she documented Aboriginal people and activism.

== Selected exhibitions ==
- 1982, 5 – 26 November: We wait no more Hogarth Gallery & Apmira
- 1985, 26 October: Gemes created a visual document of the historic Uluru Handback Ceremony at Uluru NT.
- 1989, from 19 December: Literary Images, Jacqueline Mitelman, Virginia Wallace-Crabbe and Juno Gemes. Special collections section, library of the Australian Defence Force Academy, launched by Robin Wallace-Crabbe
- 2005, 30 June to 30 November: Our Community exhibition, National Museum of Australia, Canberra
- 2005, 12 July – 10 September: PROOF: Portraits from The Movement 1978–2003 National Portrait Gallery and Macquarie University Gallery 10 March – 10 May 2004.
- 2016, November–December: Gemes' work was included in an exhibition at Carriageworks in Redfern, Sydney, celebrating the 40th anniversary of NAISDA Dance College, called Naya Wa Yugali ("We Dance" in Darkinyung language).
- 2019: Juno Gemes: The Quiet Activist, A Survey Exhibition 1979–2019
- 2019, 17 – 29 September: group show entitled Three Women Artists In Country, Maunsel Wickes at Barry Stern Galleries
