= Walkers on the Sky =

1976 sf novel by David Lake

- First edition cover
- Author: David Lake
- Language: English
- Genre: science fiction
- Publisher: DAW Books
- Publication date: 1976
- Publication place: United States of America
- Media type: Print (Paperback)
- Pages: 188
- Awards: 1977 Ditmar Award - Best Australian Fiction, winner
- ISBN: 0879972734
- Preceded by: -
- Followed by: The Right Hand of Dextra

Walkers on the Sky (1976) is a science fiction novel by Australian author David Lake. It was originally published in USA by DAW Books.

This was the first novel in the author's Breakout series, followed by The Right Hand of Dextra (1977), The Wildlings of Westron (1977), The Gods of Xuma or Barsoom Revisited (1978), Warlords of Xuma (1983) and The Fourth Hemisphere (1980).

It was the winner of the Ditmar Award for Best Australian Fiction in 1977.

== Plot summary ==
The novel is set in the far-future on a small planet named Melior, after Earth has become uninhabitable. The planet is too small to maintain a usable atmosphere so a layered series of three force fields has been implemented. A young warrior, living on one of the shells, is captured and then sold as a slave. He later escapes and starts a revolution.

== Critical reception ==
Lester del Rey, reviewing the novel in Analog Science Fiction and Fact, noted that it presented as a missed opportunity, that it "should have made for some interesting developments, and there are touches. But unfortunately, Lake has used this excellent background to turn out something like a sword-and-planet story."

Reviewing the first four novels of the series in SF Commentary 55/56 George Turner commented: "These novels are complex in conception, though fairly simple in structure, and are basically adventure stories in an sf ambience, though informed with an intellectualism which is not pushed too hard. The writing is less individual, more middle-of-the-road, than might be expected of Lake's academic background."

== Publication history ==
After the book's initial publication in USA in 1976 by DAW Books it was reprinted in the United Kingdom by Fontana Books in 1978.

== Awards and nominations ==
- 1977 Ditmar Award for Best Australian Fiction
