= David Lake (writer) =

Australian science fiction writer, poet and critic

David John Lake
- Born: 26 March 1929; Bangalore, India
- Died: 31 January 2016 (aged 86); Brisbane, Australia
- Occupations: Author, poet, critic
- Writing career
- Genre: speculative fiction

David John Lake (26 March 1929 – 31 January 2016) was an Indian-born Australian science fiction writer, poet, and literary critic. He also wrote as David Lake and David J. Lake.

== Life ==
Born in Bangalore, India 26 March 1929, India, Lake received a Jesuit education at St. Xavier's School in Calcutta (1940–44). He was originally a citizen of the United Kingdom, where he studied at Trinity College, Cambridge, receiving his Bachelor of Arts in 1952, and his Master of Arts in 1956. He went on to study at University College of North Wales, where he was awarded a diploma in linguistics in 1965, and studied at the University of Queensland (PhD, 1974). He moved to Australia in 1967, and became a naturalized Australian citizen in 1975. David Lake died from a lung infection in Brisbane, Australia, on 31 January 2016.

== Literary career ==
Lake began his writing career as a literary critic, and in that vein he is known for his books Style and Meaning, Queensland University Press, 1971, and The Canon of Thomas Middleton's Plays, Cambridge University Press, 1975.

After arriving in Australia, Lake published poetry in magazines such as Westerly, Southerly, and Makar. In 1971 he published Portnoyad and in 1973 the poetry collection, Hornpipes and Funerals.

He began writing science fiction in 1976. John Clute indicates Jungian psychology influences on some of his works. Lake might be best known for the "Breakout" sequence of novels. In two, The Gods of Xuma and Warlords of Xuma, the new world is reminiscent of Edgar Rice Burroughs's fictional version of Mars; the books take a critical stance on his Barsoom novels.

His most known work outside of that sequence is The Man who Loved Morlocks from 1981, a sequel to The Time Machine. He was essentially inactive in the genre from 1989 with the exception of one award-winning short story, "The Truth About Weena", which also involved The Time Machine. It won the Ditmar Award in 1999.

== Awards ==
- 1977 Australian SF Achievement Award, Best Australian SF, winner for Walkers on the Sky
- 1982 Australian SF Achievement Award, Best Australian SF, winner for The Man Who Loved Morlocks
- 1998 Aurealis Award for Best Science Fiction Short Story, winner for "The Truth about Weena"
- 1999 Australian SF Achievement Award, Best Australian Short SF, winner for "The Truth about Weena"

== Bibliography ==
=== Breakout sequence ===
- Walkers on the Sky (1976)
- The Right Hand of Dextra (1977)
- The Wildings of Westron (1977)
- The Gods of Xuma or Barsoom Revisited (1978)
- Warlords of Xuma (1983)
- The Fourth Hemisphere (1980)

=== Time Machine universe ===
- The Man Who Loved Morlocks (1981)
- "The Truth About Weena" (1998)

=== Other novels ===
- Ring of Truth (1982)
- The Changelings of Chaan (1985)
- West of the Moon (1988)

=== Other short fiction ===
- "Creator" (1978)
- "Re-deem the Time" (1978)
- "What Is She?" (1979)
- "Who Killed Cock Robin?" (1979)
- "The Last Day of Christmas" (1981)
- "Omphalos, a Dialogue" (1983)
- "The Pure Light of the Void" (1983)

=== Verse ===
- Portnoyad (1971)
- Hornpipes and Funerals (collection) (1973)
- "Unparty" (2010)
- "Design Faults" (2011)

=== Nonfiction ===
- Style and Meaning (1971)
- The Canon of Thomas Middleton's Plays (1975)

=== Short nonfiction ===
- "How to Get Away with Murder: Advice to a Would-Be Critic" (1979)
- "Sex as a Hard Problem in Science Fiction" (1985)
- "A Theory of Errors: The Altered Worlds of Fiction" (1986)
- "The Making of Meldilorn: A Poetics of Imaginary Names" (1987)
- "Introduction (The First Men in the Moon)" (1995)
- "Darwin and Doom: H.G.Wells and the Time Machine" (1997)
- "Arriving Home" (1998)

=== Reviews ===
- "Pilgermann" (1983) by Russell Hoban
- "Riddley Walker" (1983) by Russell Hoban
- "Charles Williams: Poet of Theology" (1984) by Glen Cavaliero
- "More Tales of Pirx the Pilot" (1984) by Stanislaw Lem
