= Grace Leven Prize for Poetry =

Annual award for poetry in Australia

The Grace Leven Prize for Poetry was an annual poetry award in Australia, given in the name of Grace Leven who died in 1922. It was established by William Baylebridge who "made a provision for an annual poetry prize in memory of 'my benefactress Grace Leven' and for the publication of his own work". Grace was his mother's half-sister.

The award is made to "the best volume of poetry published in the preceding twelve months by a writer either Australian-born, or naturalised in Australia and resident in Australia for not less than ten years". It offers only a small monetary prize, but is highly regarded by poets. It was first awarded in 1947, with the recipient being Nan McDonald's Pacific Sea. In 2012 the prize was awarded for the final time.

== Award winners ==
=== 2010s ===
Year	Author	Title	Publisher	Ref.
2012	Michael Brennan	Autoethnographic	Giramondo Publishing	
2012	Laurie Duggan	The Collected Blue Hills	Puncher and Wattmann	
2012	Toby Fitch	Rawshock	Puncher and Wattmann	
2012	John Kinsella	Jaguar's Dream	Alma Books	
2012	Michael Sharkey	Another Fine Morning in Paradise	Five Islands Press	
2011	Not awarded			
2010	LK Holt	Patience, Mutiny	John Leonard Press	
2010	David Musgrave	Phantom Limb	John Leonard Press	
2010	Petra White	The Simplified World	John Leonard Press	

=== 2000s ===
Year	Author	Title	Publisher	Ref.
2009	Not awarded			
2008	Alan Wearne	The Australian Popular Songbook	Giramondo Publishing	
2007	Robert Adamson	The Goldfinches of Baghdad	Flood Editions	
2006	Alan Gould	The Past Completes Me: Selected Poems 1973–2003	University of Queensland Press	
2005	Noel Rowe	Next to Nothing	Vagabond Press	
2004	Luke Davies	Totem	Allen and Unwin	
2003	Stephen Edgar	Lost in the Foreground	Duffy and Snellgrove	
2002	Kate Lilley	Versary	Salt Publishing	
2001	Geoff Page	Darker and Lighter	Five Islands Press	
2000	Not awarded			

=== 1990s ===
Year	Author	Title	Publisher	Ref.
1999	Not awarded			
1998	Not awarded			
1997	Geoffrey Lehmann	Collected Poems	Heinemann	
1996	John Kinsella	The Undertow: New and Selected Poems	Arc Publications	
1995	Kevin Hart	New and Selected Poems	Angus and Robertson	
1995	Rhyll McMaster	Flying the Coop : New and Selected Poems 1972–1994	Heinemann	
1995	Jemal Sharah	Path of Ghosts: poems 1986–93	Heinemann	
1994	Not awarded			
1993	Philip Hodgins	The End of the Season	Brindabella Press	
1992	Gary Catalano	Empire of Grass	University of Queensland Press	
1992	Kevin Hart	Peniel	Golvan Arts	
1991	Les Murray	Dog Fox Field	Angus and Robertson	
1990	Not awarded			

=== 1980s ===
Year	Author	Title	Publisher	Ref.
1989	Dorothy Hewett	A Tremendous World in Her Head	Dangaroo Press	
1988	John Tranter	Under Berlin	University of Queensland Press	
1987	Elizabeth Riddell	Occasions of Birds and Other Poems	Brindabella Press	
1986	Rhyll McMaster	Washing the Money : Poems with Photographs	Angus and Robertson	
1985	Robert Gray	Selected Poems 1963-1983	Angus and Robertson	
1985	Chris Wallace-Crabbe	The Amorous Cannibal	Oxford University Press	
1984	Rosemary Dobson	The Three Fates & Other Poems	Hale and Iremonger	
1983	Peter Porter	Collected Poems	Oxford University Press	
1982	Vivian Smith	Tide Country	Angus and Robertson	
1981	Geoffrey Lehmann	Nero's Poems: Translations of the Public and Private Poems of the Emperor Nero	Angus and Robertson	
1980	Les Murray	The Boys Who Stole the Funeral	Angus and Robertson	

=== 1970s ===
Year	Author	Title	Publisher	Ref.
1979	David Campbell	The Man in the Honeysuckle	Angus and Robertson	
1978	Bruce Dawe	Sometimes Gladness: Collected Poems 1954–1978	Longman Cheshire	
1977	Robert Adamson	Selected Poems	Angus and Robertson	
1976	John Blight	Selected Poems 1939–1975	Nelson	
1975	Gwen Harwood	Selected Poems	Angus and Robertson	
1974	David Malouf	Neighbours in a Thicket	University of Queensland Press	
1973	Rodney Hall	A Soapbox Omnibus	University of Queensland Press	
1972	Peter Skrzynecki	Headwaters	Lyre Bird Writers	
1971	Judith Wright	Collected Poems, 1942–1970	Angus and Robertson	
1971	James McAuley	Collected Poems 1936–1970	Angus and Robertson	
1970	Bruce Beaver	Letters to Live Poets	South Head Press	

=== 1960s ===
Year	Author	Title	Publisher	Ref.
1969	Randolph Stow	A Counterfeit Silence: Selected Poems	Angus and Robertson	
1968	David Campbell	Selected Poems 1942–1968	Angus and Robertson	
1967	Douglas Stewart	Collected Poems 1936–1967	Angus and Robertson	
1966	William Hart-Smith	The Talking Clothes: Poems	Angus and Robertson	
1965	Les Murray and Geoffrey Lehmann	The Ilex Tree	ANU Press	
1964	David Rowbotham	All the Room	Jacaranda Press	
1963	Ian Mudie	The North-Bound Rider	Rigby	
1962	R. D. Fitzgerald	Southmost Twelve	Angus and Robertson	
1961	Thomas Shapcott	Time on Fire	Jacaranda Press	
1960	Colin Thiele	Man in a Landscape	Rigby	

=== 1950s ===
Year	Author	Title	Publisher	Ref.
1959	R. D. Fitzgerald	The Wind at Your Door	Talkarra Press	
1958	Geoffrey Dutton	Antipodes in Shoes	Edwards and Shaw	
1957	Leonard Mann	Elegiac and Other Poems	Cheshire	
1956	James McAuley	A Vision of Ceremony	Angus & Robertson	
1955	A. D. Hope	The Wandering Islands	Edwards and Shaw	
1954	John Thompson	Thirty Poems	Edwards and Shaw	
1953	Roland Robinson	Tumult of the Swans	Edwards and Shaw	
1952	R. D. Fitzgerald	Between Two Tides	Halstead Press	
1951	Rex Ingamells	The Great South Land: An Epic Poem	Georgian House	
1950	No award			

=== 1940s ===
Year	Author	Title	Publisher	Ref.
1949	Judith Wright	Woman to Man	Angus & Robertson	
1948	Francis Webb	A Drum for Ben Boyd	Angus & Robertson	
1947	Nan McDonald	Pacific Sea	Angus & Robertson	
