= Santiago B. Villafania =

Filipino poet (1971–2024)

- Born: January 31, 1971; Santa Barbara, Pangasinan, Philippines
- Died: February 26, 2024 (aged 53); Dagupan, Pangasinan, Philippines
- Occupations: Poet, literature teacher
- Writing career
- Genre: Poetry
- Movement: Anacbanua
- Website: svillafania.philippinepen.ph

Santiago Villafania (January 31, 1971 – February 26, 2024) was a Filipino poet who wrote in Pangasinan and English.

== Biography ==
Born in Tuliao, Santa Barbara, Pangasinan, Villafania graduated with a degree of Bachelor of Arts in English from the University of Pangasinan in 1991. He was a vice president of the Philippine branch of PEN International and the head of its Translation and Linguistic Rights Committee. He was also a commissioner for the Pangasinan Historical and Cultural Commission.

Villafania advocated for the resurgence of Pangasinan as a literary language. His works in the vernacular were described as some of the most representative of contemporary Pangasinan literature. His book of poems, Malagilion: Sonnets tan Villanelles, was described as an attempt to open the propylaea of literary renaissance in Pangasinan. During his lifetime, Villafania created 300 sonnets and 50 villanelles in Pangasinan. It was also recognized by the National Book Development Board and the Manila Critics Circle as a Finalist for Best Book of Poetry in the 27th National Book Award in 2008.

Villafania was one of the 11 Outstanding Pangasinenses conferred with the 2010 Asna Award for the Arts and Culture (Literature) during the first Agew na Pangasinan and also the 430th Foundation Anniversary of the province on 5 April 2010.

Villafania resided in Mangaldan, and died at the Nazareth Hospital in Dagupan, on February 26, 2024, at the age of 53.

== Books ==
- Balikas na Caboloan (Voices from Caboloan, 2005)
- Malagilion: Sonnets tan Villanelles (2007)
- Pinabli & Other Poems (2012)
- Bonsaic Verses (2012)
- Ghazalia: Maralus ya Ayat (2013)
- As I Tango (2016)

== Awards ==
- Asna Awardee for Literature (2010)
