= Richard Krygier =

Australian journalist

Henry Richard Krygier OBE (9 September 1917 – 27 September 1986) was a Polish-born Jewish Australian anti-communist publisher and journalist, and a founder of Quadrant magazine.

== Education and career ==
He was born in 1917 in Warsaw, of Jewish parents, and as a law student was active in student politics at the Józef Piłsudski (Warsaw) University. His early sympathies with communism were shattered by events such as the Soviet purges of the 1930s and the Molotov–Ribbentrop pact and he remained a vigorous lifelong anti-communist.

In 1939, he and his wife, Roma, escaped to Kaunas, Lithuania, where they obtained Japanese transit visas. They reached Sydney, via Vladivostok, Japan, and Shanghai, in 1941. In Sydney, he was active in Polish journalism and import-export businesses. He was a supporter of the Australian Labor Party, and in 1947 he became a naturalized citizen.

Krygier's anti-totalitarian, liberal, democratic perspective led him to sympathise with the International Congress for Cultural Freedom, founded in West Berlin in 1950. In 1954, he formed and became secretary of its Australian arm, the Australian Committee (later Association) for Cultural Freedom.

The Association's principal achievement, as well as his, was the creation in 1956 of the literary-political magazine Quadrant, under the editorship of James McAuley. Krygier was publisher, business manager, and fund-raiser. In addition, he organised lecture tours of prominent overseas political and cultural figures and conferences on the problems of establishing democracy in developing states.

He remained active in Quadrant up to his death in 1986. For the last four years of his life, he wrote a regular Quadrant column, but he had contributed a few other pieces to the magazine before then.

== Personal life ==
He married Romualda (Roma) Halpern in Warsaw in 1939.

They had two children, a daughter and a son Martin Krygier (born 1949) who is the Gordon Samuels Professor of Law and Social Theory at the University of New South Wales. Richard Krygier died of cancer on 27 September 1986 at Darlinghurst, New South Wales and was cremated.
