= F. B. Vickers =

Australian novelist

- Born: England
- Citizenship: Australian

Frederick Bert Vickers (1903—18 July 1985) was an Australian novelist.

== 1903 - 1985 ==
F. B Vickers was born in England on 25 March 1903 at Rood End, Oldbury, Worcestershire. He was the eldest son of Thomas Vickers (engine-fitter) and Elizabeth Alice Amelia, née Jukes. On 9 February 1938 he married Louie Rachael, née Horner at St. Albans Church of England, Highgate Hill, Perth. In also married Elsie Mavys (Sue) Johnson, on 7 January 1970.

== Migration to Australia ==
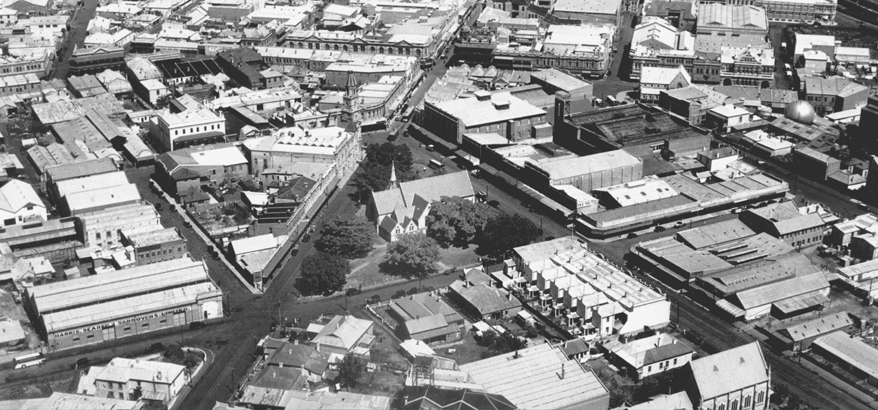
View of Fremantle 1933.

F. B. Vickers migrated to Australia, Fremantle, Western Australia, as he was unable to find employment after the factory closed where he was an apprentice fitter and turner in 1925. He worked on the land, on sheep stations, as a poultry farmer and in road gangs, before serving with the Australian Imperial Force in the Middle East during World War II . After suffering a leg injury he returned to recuperate in Australia and began to write while recovering in hospital. He wrote short stories and radio plays and two plays for the stage. In addition to writing six novels he also gave many talks on A.B.C. radio. In 1948 he received an honourable mention in the Sydney Morning Herald novel competition, and shared the third prize the next year with another novel. He served as President of the Fellowship of Australian Writers. He wrote at least 26 published works and died in 1985.

== Bibliography ==
- Mirage (Australasian Book Society, 1955) Translated into Hungarian and Russian
- First Place To The Stranger (Constable, 1956)
- Though Poppies Grow (Australasian Book Society, 1958)
- No Man Is Himself (Australasian Book Society, 1969) The novel is set in the north west of Western Australia and concerns an officer in charge of Native Welfare who is sympathetic to Aboriginals but involved in personal difficulties with the white community and his wife.
- Without Map or Compass (Australasian Book Society, 1974) This book was commended in the 1975 Australian National Book Council Awards for autobiography.
- Stranger No Longer (Australasian Book Society, 1977)
- The Last Foot - radio play
