= Kerstin Thorvall =

Swedish novelist

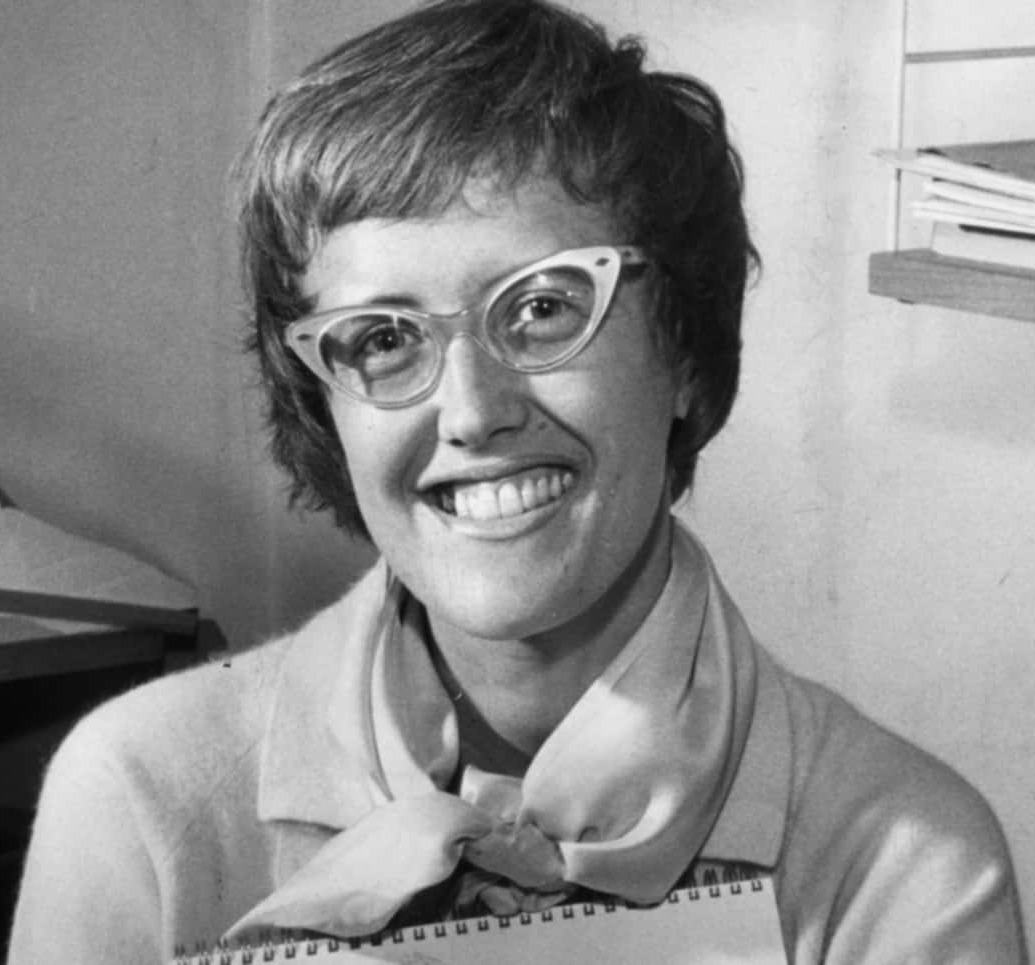
Kerstin Thorvall in 1959

Kerstin Thorvall (12 August 1925 in Eskilstuna – 9 April 2010) was an influential Swedish novelist.

Thorvall was born in Eskilstuna on 12 August 1925. She worked in illustration first. Her first book was Boken till dig (A book for you) in 1959, which proved popular with young adult readers.

Her work was at times the subject of controversy, most marked by her 1976 novel Det mest förbjudna (which translates to "The Most Forbidden", but published in English translation as "Forbidden Fruit") which concerned a middle-age woman with a high sex drive. That novel was adapted into a three-episode television series on Sveriges Television in 2016, with Swedish actress Cilla Thorell playing Thorvall.

Thorvall died in April 2010 after a long illness in an elderly care facility.

== Selected works ==
- Förstå mig (with Gustaf Jonsson) (1957)
- Boken till dig (1959)
- Kvinnoglädje (1960)
- För henne (1960)
- Flicka i april (1961) (published in English as Girl in April (1963), translation by Annabelle Macmillan)
- Någon att tycka om (1962)
- Flicka i Paris (1963)
- Flickan i verkligheten (1964)
- Den nya kvinnan (1965)
- Dubbelroll (1965)
- Porträtt av ett mycket litet barn (1965)
- Andra boken till dig (1965)
- Jag vill dansa (1966)
- Gunnar gör mål (1966) (published in English as Gunnar Scores a Goal (1968))
- Anders och hans stora bror (1966)
- Fula ord är så sköna (1967)
- Det var inte meningen (1967)
- När Gunnar ville spela ishockey (1967)
- Thomas – En vecka i maj (1967)
- Kvinnor och barn (1968)
- Gunnar vill inte klippa håret (1968)
- "Vart ska du gå?" "Ut" (1969)
- Anders leker kurragömma (1970)
- Peter möter Cecilia (1970)
- Nämen Gunnar! (1970)
- Följetong i skärt och svart (1971)(published in English as And Leffe Was Instead of a Dad (1974))
- I min trotsålder (1971)
- Resan till Italien (1971)
- I stället för en pappa (1971)
- Jag vet hur det känns- (1972)
- Mamma, var är du? (1972)
- Hur blir det sen då? (1972)
- Men akta dig, så att du inte blir kär (1973)
- Tala mera om det (1973)
- Sergio i Chile (1973)
- Jag vill också vara med (1973)
- Min pappa säger att din pappa sitter i fängelse (1974)
- Godnattsagor om Anders, nästan 4 (1974)
- Sara (1975)
- Vart ska du gå? Vet inte (1975) I
- Det ska vara en farmor i år (1976)
- Att älska Sussy (1976)
- Det mest förbjudna (1976)
- Den lyckliga kärleken (1977)
- Oskuldens död (1977)
- Mer om Sara (1977)
- Anders hittar en kattunge (1978)
- Ensam dam reser ensam (1979)
- Doften av pion (1980)
- Jonas och kärleken (1980)
- Din lycka är min (1981)
- Tänk om det är klimakteriet (1982)
- "Isa aseaine" (1983)
- Ett fönster på glänt (1984)
- Kärleksdikter (1985)
- Den försvunna mamman (1985)
- Johanna (1985)
- Tacka och ta emot och andra berättelser om kärlekens förvillelser (1987)
- Svart resa (1987)
- Nedstigen ängel (1991)
- När man skjuter arbetare... (1993)
- I skuggan av oron (1995)
- Från Signe till Alberte (1998)
- Berättelsen om Signe (1999)
- Provokationer, passioner, personer och en eller annan hyacint (1999)
- Jag minns alla mina älskare och hur de brukade ta på mig (2000)
- Nödvändigheten i att dansa (2001)
- Upptäckten (2003)
- Jag är en grön bänk i Paris – Dikter 1965–1991 (2005)
