= Other People (poem) =

1971 poem by Australian poet Chris Wallace-Crabbe

- by Chris Wallace-Crabbe
- Country: Australia
- Language: English
- Publisher: We Took Their Orders and Are Dead : An Anti-War Anthology edited by Shirley Cass, Ros Cheney, David Malouf, and Michael Wilding, 1971
- Publication date: 1971
- Lines: 24

"Other People" (1971) is a poem by Australian poet Chris Wallace-Crabbe.

It was originally published in We Took Their Orders and Are Dead : An Anti-War Anthology edited by Shirley Cass, Ros Cheney, David Malouf, and Michael Wilding, in 1971, and was subsequently reprinted in the author's single-author collections and a number of Australian poetry anthologies.

== Synopsis ==
A young man looks back at World War I and laments that four of his uncles were lost in that war. He wonders if anyone cares who the enemy was any more. "Their chalk was wiped clean off the slate,/The War meant nothing at all."

== Critical reception ==
In his commentary on the poem in 60 Classic Australian Poems Geoff Page noted that , contrary to a lot of other war poems, "'Other People' over nearly 40 years has retained its force – and its charm. 'Charm' may seem a strange word in relation to a successful anti-war poem, but that is what the poem has – and in abundance.

== Publication history ==
After the poem's initial publication in We Took Their Orders and Are Dead : An Anti-War Anthology it was reprinted as follows:

- Twelve Poets, 1950-1970 edited by Alexander Craig, Jacaranda Press, 1971
- Where the Wind Came : Poems by Chris Wallace-Crabbe, Angus and Robertson, 1971
- Disenchantment edited by Owen Webster, Goldstar Publications, 1972
- Australian Verse from 1805 : A Continuum edited by Geoffrey Dutton, Rigby, 1976
- The Illustrated Treasury of Australian Verse edited by Beatrice Davis, Nelson, 1984
- Violence to Non-Violence : Individual Perspectives, Communal Voices : an Anthology edited by William Kelly, Harwood Academic/Craftsman House, 1994
- The Thing Itself and Other Poems by Chris Wallace-Crabbe, Picaro Press, 2007
- 60 Classic Australian Poems edited by Geoff Page, University of NSW Press, 2009
- The Puncher & Wattmann Anthology of Australian Poetry edited by John Leonard, Puncher & Wattmann, 2009
- New and Selected Poems by Chris Wallace-Crabbe, Carcanet, 2013
- This is Home : Essential Australian Poems for Children edited by Jackie French, National Library of Australia, 2019

== Notes ==
- You can read the full text of the poem on the Poets Union webpage, "Poems About War".

== See also ==
- 1971 in Australian literature
- 1971 in poetry
