= A Vision of Ceremony =

1956 poetry collection by James McAuley

- Title page for A Vision of Ceremony (1956)
- Author: James McAuley
- Language: English
- Genre: Poetry collection
- Publisher: Angus and Robertson
- Publication date: 1956
- Publication place: Australia
- Media type: Print
- Pages: 69 pp.
- Awards: 1956 Grace Leven Prize for Poetry

A Vision of Ceremony is a collection of poems by Australian writer James McAuley, published by Angus and Robertson in 1956.

The collection contains 31 poems, most of which had been previously published in Australian literary publications such as The Bulletin, Hermes, Meanjin, Southerly and various original poetry anthologies.

== Contents ==
- "Invocation"
- "Black Swans : 1946-1955"
- "At Dawn"
- "Jesus"
- "To a Dead Bird of Paradise"
- "Mating Swans"
- "Tune for Swans"
- "Memorial (to Some residents of New Guinea)"
- "Sequence"
- "Canticle"
- "To the Holy Spirit"
- "Nativity"
- "An Art of Poetry"
- "Palm"
- "Prefiguration"
- "New Guinea"
- "Meditation (from Hugo von Hofmannsthal)"
- "The Royal Fireworks"
- "Prologue"
- "The Middle of Life (from Friedrich Holderlin)"
- "Vespers"
- "Late Winter"
- "Celebration of Divine Love"
- "To Any Poet"
- "A Leaf of Sage"
- "The Hero and the Hydra"
- "Prometheus : A Secular Masque"
- "The Death of Chiron"
- "The Ascent of Heracles"
- "The Tomb of Heracles"
- "A Letter to John Dryden"

== Critical reception ==
Writing in The Bulletin a reviewer noted McAuley's "shrewd, nuggety plainness of style" and the poet being "more often dogged than solemn."

Ian Mair, in The Age, thought of the poet that the "irony and hard glitter that once he had have now gone" concluding that McAuley is best "when he is a romantic."

The Oxford Companion to Australian Literature states: "Using the Greek tales based on the Prometheus legend, McAuley comments adversely on modern civilization and affirms traditional moral and spiritual values."

The Oxford Literary History of Australia noted that, with this collection, McAuley "turned away from all those soul-struggles to the disappointment of many of McAuley's contemporaries; it sought a broad, well-lighted tradition."

== Awards ==
- 1956 Grace Leven Prize for Poetry, winner

== See also ==
- 1956 in Australian literature
