= Robert Adamson (poet) =

Australian poet and publisher (1943–2022)

- Born: 17 May 1943; Sydney, New South Wales, Australia
- Died: 16 December 2022 (aged 79); Wahroonga, New South Wales, Australia
- Citizenship: Australian
- Occupation: Poet
- Spouse: Juno Gemes
- Writing career
- Language: English

Robert Adamson (17 May 1943 – 16 December 2022) was an Australian poet and publisher.

== Biography ==
Born in Sydney, Adamson grew up in Neutral Bay and spent much of his teenage years in Gosford Boys Home for juvenile offenders. He discovered poetry while educating himself in gaol in his 20s. His first book, Canticles on the Skin, was published in 1970. He acknowledges the influence of, among others, Rimbaud, Mallarmé, and Hart Crane upon his writing. But also American poets such as Robert Duncan and Robert Creeley were important and influential contemporaries.

In the 1970s and 1980s, Adamson edited New Poetry magazine and established Paper Bark Press in 1986 with his partner, photographer Juno Gemes, and writer Michael Wilding, which published Australian poetry. Wilding left the company in 1990, and Gemes and Adamson continued to run the company until 2002.

In 2011, he won the Patrick White Award and the Blake Poetry Prize.

Adamson was appointed the inaugural CAL chair of poetry at UTS (University of Technology, Sydney) in 2012.

== Death ==
Adamson died in palliative care (Neringah Hospital), Wahroonga, New South Wales, on 16 December 2022, at the age of 79.

== Works ==
=== Poetry ===
- Canticles on the Skin (Sydney: Illumination Press, 1970)
- Cross The Border (Sydney: New Poetry, 1977 and Hale & Iremonger, 1982). ISBN 0-86806-050-X
- Selected Poems (Sydney: Angus & Robertson, 1977). ISBN 0-207-13515-0
- Where I Come From (Sydney: Big Smoke, 1979). ISBN 0-908201-00-1
- The Clean Dark (Sydney: Paper Bark, 1989). ISBN 0-9587801-2-9
- Waving to Hart Crane (Sydney: Angus & Robertson, 1994). ISBN 0-207-18347-3
- Black Water: Approaching Zukofsky (Sydney: Brandl & Schlesinger, 1999) ISBN 1-876040-14-9
- Mulberry Leaves: New & Selected Poems 1970-2001 (2001). ISBN 1-876749-48-2
- Reading the River: Selected Poems (Bloodaxe Books, UK, 2004). ISBN 978-1-85224-639-6
- The Goldfinches of Baghdad (Flood Editions, USA, 2006). ISBN 0-9746902-8-7
- The Golden Bird: New and Selected Poems (Melbourne: Black Inc., 2008). ISBN 978-1-86395-287-3
- The Kingfisher's Soul (Bloodaxe Books, UK, 2009). ISBN 978-1-85224-820-8
- Empty Your Eyes. (Vagabond Press, 2013)
- Net Needle (Black Inc, 2015) ISBN 978-1-86395-731-1. (Flood Editions, USA, 2015). ISBN 978-0-9903407-1-3. (Bloodaxe Books, UK, 2016) ISBN 978-1-78037-301-0
- Garden Poem
- Reaching Light: Selected Poems (Flood Editions, USA, 2020). ISBN 978-1733273428

=== Autobiography ===
- Zimmer's Essay. With Bruce Hanford (Sydney: Wild & Woolley, 1974). ISBN 0-909331-02-2
- Wards of the State (Sydney: Angus & Robertson, 1992). ISBN 0-207-17404-0
- Inside Out (Text, 2004). ISBN 1-920885-60-9

== Awards ==
- 1976: Grace Leven Prize for Poetry for Selected Poems
- 1990: C. J. Dennis Prize for Poetry for The Clean Dark
- 1990: Kenneth Slessor Prize for Poetry for The Clean Dark
- 1990: The Turnbull-Fox-Phillips Award (The National Book Council Banjo Award) for The Clean Dark
- 1994: FAW Christopher Brennan Award for lifetime achievement in literature
- 2004: New South Wales Premier's History Award for Inside Out
- 2007: The Age Book of the Year Poetry Prize for The Goldfinches of Baghdad
- 2007: Grace Leven Prize for Poetry for The Goldfinches of Baghdad
- 2011: Patrick White Award
