= Takashi Matsumoto (poet) =

Japanese writer

- Matsumoto Takashi
- Born: 5 January 1906; Tokyo, Japan
- Died: 11 May 1956 (aged 50)
- Occupation: Writer
- Writing career
- Genres: haiku poetry, essays

Takashi Matsumoto (松本 たかし, born 松本 孝, Matsumoto Takashi; 5 January 1906 – 11 May 1956) was a Japanese haiku poet active in Shōwa period Japan.

== Early life ==
Matsumoto was born in the Sarugakuchō district of Tokyo into a family of Noh theater players of the Hosho school. His stage debut was at the age of eight. From the earliest age, he was devoted to honing his skills as a Noh actor. He also had a strong interest in classical Chinese literature, Japanese calligraphy and the English language, and was also fond of popular theater and rakugo comic storytelling.

While recovering from an illness in 1921, he came across the haiku literary magazine Hototogisu. Later, he joined Shippo-kai, a haiku circle predominantly for Noh actors and began to study haiku under the famed poet Takahama Kyoshi. At around the age of 20, Matsumoto abandoned the idea of becoming a Noh actor because of his ongoing health problems and turned to composing haiku professionally.

After spending the summer of 1925 recuperating from illness in Kamakura, Matsumoto moved there the following year and made it his home until 1945. He composed many verses about Kamakura during that period.

In 1929, he joined the Hototogisu group, where he was acknowledged to be an equal of the much acclaimed Kawabata Bosha.

== Literary career ==
In 1935, Matsumoto published his first haiku anthology, Matsumoto Takashi Kushu. This was followed by the haiku anthologies Taka ("Hawk"), Yumi ("Arrow"), Nomori ("Gamekeeper") and the essay collections of Ego no Hana ("Styrax blossom"), and Kanawa ("Iron Ring")

In 1946, he began his own literary magazine, Fue ("Flute"). He also wrote a biographical novel about the late nineteenth century Noh actor, Hosho Kuro. In 1954, he was awarded the 5th Yomiuri Literary Prize for haiku.

Matsumoto died in 1956 at the age of 50.

== See also ==
- Japanese literature
- List of Japanese authors
