= Kawabata Bōsha =

Japanese haiku poet

- 川端 茅舎
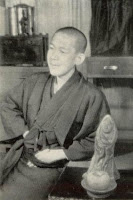
- Born: August 17, 1897
- Died: July 17, 1941

Kawabata Bōsha (川端 茅舎; August 17, 1897 – July 17, 1941) was a Japanese haiku poet.

== Life ==
Kawabata Bōsha was born on August 17, 1897, in Nihonbashi, Tokyo. He was the son of an amateur haiku poet, painter, and calligrapher, and the younger brother or half-brother of the painter Kawabata Ryūshi. His parents ran a geisha house when he was a child, prompting Kawabata to develop puritanical and reclusive tendencies.

When his family home was destroyed in the 1923 Great Kantō earthquake, Kawabata took up residence in the Tōfuku-ji in Kyoto, where he studied Zen Buddhism for four years. He also studied painting under Kishida Ryūsei until the latter's death in 1929. He eventually gave up both Buddhism and painting due to illness. In 1931 he developed tuberculosis of the spine and was bedridden for the remainder of his life.

Kawabata Bōsha died on 17 July 1941.

== Poetry ==
Kawabata began publishing haiku in magazines while he was still a teenager. In 1915, he was first published in Hototogisu ("Cuckoo"), the magazine of the haiku school centered on Kyoshi Takahama, a conservative movement focused on the natural world. While many adherents later broke with Kyoshi, Kawabata's devotion to the Hototogisu school's principles was such that one critic labeled him a "martyr" to "flowers and birds." (In 1929, Hototogisu published Kyoshi's famous dictum that the subject matter of haiku was "flowers and birds.") Kawabata's work was also noted for its use of onomatopoeia and its religious imagery, both Buddhist and Christian.

In 1934, he published his first collection of poetry, Kawabata Bōsha Kushū. It began with 26 haiku about dew, whose transitory nature was a particular focus of Kawabata's work. His second collection, Kegon, featured an introduction by Kyoshi, where he praised Kawabata as the leading figure "in the mysteries of nature poetry."

The Haiku of Kawabata Bōsha, a Definitive Edition was published posthumously in 1946.
