= James McAuley =

Australian poet and academic

- McAuley around 1971
- Born: James Phillip McAuley; 12 October 1917; Lakemba, New South Wales, Australia
- Died: 15 October 1976 (aged 59); Hobart, Tasmania, Australia
- Occupations: Academic, poet, journalist, critic
- Known for: Ern Malley hoax

James Phillip McAuley (12 October 1917 – 15 October 1976) was an Australian academic, poet, journalist, literary critic, and a prominent convert to Roman Catholicism. He was involved in the Ern Malley poetry hoax.

== Life and career ==
McAuley was born in Lakemba, a suburb of Sydney. He was educated at Fort Street High School and then attended Sydney University, where he majored in English, Latin and philosophy (which he studied under John Anderson. In 1937 he edited Hermes, the annual literary journal of the University of Sydney Union, in which many of his early poems, beginning in 1935, were published until 1941.

He began his life as an Anglican and was sometime organist and choirmaster at Holy Trinity Church, Dulwich Hill, in Sydney.

In 1943, he was commissioned as a lieutenant in the militia for the Australian Army and served in Melbourne (DORCA) and Canberra. After the war he also spent time in New Guinea, which he regarded as his second "spiritual home". There he is rumoured to have shot a Japanese soldier dead on Manus Island in order to satisfy his curiosity about what it was like to kill somebody.

McAuley came to prominence in the wake of the 1943–44 Ern Malley hoax. With fellow poet Harold Stewart, McAuley concocted sixteen nonsense poems in a pseudo-experimental modernist style. These were then sent to the young editor of the literary magazine Angry Penguins, Max Harris. The poems were raced to publication by Harris and Australia's most celebrated literary hoax was set in motion.

Peter Coleman considered that "no one else in Australian letters has so effectively exposed or ridiculed modernist verse, leftie politics and mindless liberalism".

In 1952 he converted to Roman Catholicism, the faith his own father had abandoned, following an intense spiritual experience at a Catholic mission in New Guinea.

This was in the parish of St Charles at Ryde. He was later introduced to Australian musician Richard Connolly by a priest, Ted Kennedy, at the Holy Spirit parish at North Ryde and the two subsequently collaborated to produce between them the most significant collection of Australian Catholic hymnody to date, titled "Hymns for the Year of Grace".

Connolly was McAuley's sponsor for his confirmation into the Roman Catholic Church. McAuley had been influenced during his undergraduate years by communism, anarchism and the freethinking philosophy of Professor John Anderson.

He remained staunchly anti-communist throughout his later life. In 1956 he and Richard Krygier founded the literary and cultural journal, Quadrant and was chief editor until 1963. From 1961 he was professor of English at the University of Tasmania.

A portrait of McAuley by Jack Carington Smith won the 1963 Archibald prize.

== Death ==
James McAuley died of cancer in 1976, at the age of 59, in Hobart.

== Bibliography ==
- The Darkening Ecliptic Ern Malley (James McAuley with Harold Stewart, 1944) Melbourne: Angry Penguins literary journal

=== Poetry ===
- Under Aldebaran (1946) Melbourne: Melbourne University Press.
- A Vision of Ceremony (1956) Sydney: Angus & Robertson.
- The Six Days of Creation (1963) An Australian Letters Publication.
- James McAuley (1963) 'Australian Poets Series' Sydney: Angus & Robertson.
- Captain Quiros (1964) Sydney: Angus & Robertson.
- Surprises of the Sun (1969) Sydney: Angus & Robertson.
- Collected Poems 1936–1970 (1971) Sydney : Angus & Robertson.
- A Map of Australian Verse (1975) Melbourne: Oxford University Press.
- Music Late at Night (1976) London; Sydney : Angus & Robertson.
- Time Given: Poems 1970–1976 (1976) Canberra : Brindabella Press.
- A World of Its own (1977) Canberra : Australian National University Press.

=== Prose ===
- The End of Modernity: Essays on Literature, Art and Culture (1959) Sydney: Angus & Robertson.
- A Primer of English Versification (1966) Sydney: Sydney University Press.
- C. J. Brennan (1963) Melbourne: Oxford University Press.
- Edmund Spenser and George Eliot: A Critical Excursion (1963) University of Tasmania.
- Hobart (1964) Sydney: Current Affairs Bulletin.
- Versification: A Short Introduction (1966) Michigan State University Press.
- The Personal Element in Australian Poetry (1970) Foundation for Australian Literary Studies, Townsville. Sydney: Angus & Robertson.
- The Grammar of the Real: Selected Prose 1959–1974 (1975) Melbourne: Oxford University Press.
- The rhetoric of Australian poetry (1978) Surrey Hills: Wentworth Press.

=== Editions and Selections ===
- Australian Poetry 1955 (1955) Sydney: Angus & Robertson.
- Generations: poetry from Chaucer to the present day (1969) Melbourne: Thomas Nelson.
- The Darkening Ecliptic (with Harold Stewart, 2017 reprint) Los Angeles: Green Integer, ISBN 978-1-55713-439-4

=== Hymns ===
- Hymns for the Year of Grace (n.d.) Sydney: Living Parish Series.
- We Offer Mass (n.d.) Sydney: Living Parish Series.

=== Translation ===
- Song of Songs (1966) Darton: Longman & Todd.

=== Selected list of poems ===
Title	Year	First published	Reprinted/collected in
"Because"	1968	Australian Poetry 1968 edited by Dorothy Auchterlonie, Angus and Robertson, 1968	Surprises of the Sun, Angus and Robertson, 1969, pg. 5-6

== Sources ==
- Coleman, Peter. "James McAuley: A Poet in Politics". The Rathouse.
- Cook, Michael (15 October 2006). "Remembering a poet of commitment". MercatorNet.
- Malley, Ern (2017). The Darkening Ecliptic. Los Angeles: Green Integer. ISBN 978-1-55713-439-4.
