= 1957 in Australian literature =

This article presents a list of the historical events and publications of Australian literature during 1957.

== Events ==
- The journal Australian Letters: A Quarterly of Writing and Criticism was founded by Max Harris, Geoffrey Dutton and Bryn Davies. Its final issue was published in January 1968.

== Books ==
- James Aldridge – I Wish He Would Not Die
- Martin Boyd – Outbreak of Love
- Jon Cleary – The Green Helmet
- Nino Culotta – They're a Weird Mob
- Elizabeth Harrower – Down in the City
- D'Arcy Niland – Call Me When the Cross Turns Over
- Vance Palmer – Seedtime
- Ruth Park – One-a-Pecker, Two-a-Pecker
- Nevil Shute – On the Beach
- Randolph Stow – The Bystander
- F. J. Thwaites – White Moonlight
- Arthur Upfield – The Bushman Who Came Back
- Judah Waten – Shares in Murder
- Morris West – The Big Story
- Patrick White – Voss

== Short stories ==
- A. Bertram Chandler – "The Cage"
- John Morrison – "A Man's World"
- Vance Palmer – The Rainbow Bird and Other Stories
- Steele Rudd – Sandy's Selection and Back At Our Selection
- Dal Stivens – The Scholarly Mouse and Other Tales
- Judah Waten – "The Knife"
- Patrick White – "On the Balcony"
- Amy Witting – "A Bottle of Tears"

== Children's and Young Adult fiction ==
- Nan Chauncy – Tiger in the Bush
- Enid Moodie Heddle – The Boomerang Book of Legendary Tales (edited) illustrated by Nancy Parker
- Joan Phipson – It Happened One Summer
- Patricia Wrightson – The Bunyip Hole

== Poetry ==
- David Campbell – "On Frosty Days"
- Max Harris
  - "At the Circus"
  - "The Death of Bert Sassenowsky"
- William Hart-Smith – "Boomerang"
- Gwen Harwood
  - "Last Meeting"
  - "Panther and Peacock"
- Nancy Keesing & Douglas Stewart – Old Bush Songs and Rhymes of Colonial Times (edited)
- Henry Kendall & T. Inglis Moore – Selected Poems of Henry Kendall
- Jack Lindsay – Three Elegies
- James McAuley – "Aubade"
- Leonard Mann – Elegiac and Other Poems
- Ian Mudie – "I Wouldn't be Lord Mayor"
- Kenneth Slessor – Poems
- Douglas Stewart – "The Silkworms"
- Randolph Stow – Act One : Poems
- Colin Thiele – "Bert Schultz"
- Judith Wright – New Land, New Language : An Anthology of Australian Verse (edited)

== Plays ==
- Richard Beynon – The Shifting Heart

== Non-fiction ==
- F. J. Thwaites – Husky Be My Guide (travel book)

== Awards and honours ==
=== Literary ===
| Award | Author | Title | Publisher |
|---|---|---|---|
| ALS Gold Medal | Martin Boyd | A Difficult Young Man | Cresset Press |
| Miles Franklin Award | Patrick White | Voss | Eyre & Spottiswoode |

=== Children's and Young Adult ===
| Award | Category | Author | Title | Publisher |
|---|---|---|---|---|
| Children's Book of the Year Award | Older Readers | Enid Moodie Heddle, illustrated by Nancy Parker | The Boomerang Book of Legendary Tales | Longmans Green |

=== Poetry ===
| Award | Author | Title | Publisher |
|---|---|---|---|
| Grace Leven Prize for Poetry | Leonard Mann | Elegiac and Other Poems | Cheshire |

== Births ==
A list, ordered by date of birth (and, if the date is either unspecified or repeated, ordered alphabetically by surname) of births in 1957 of Australian literary figures, authors of written works or literature-related individuals follows, including year of death.

- 18 February – Kim Scott, novelist
- 31 March – Hannie Rayson, playwright
- 2 July – Sara Douglass, novelist (died 2011)
- 29 July – Liam Davison, novelist and critic (died 2014)
- 11 November – Michelle de Kretser, novelist

Unknown date

- Tony Birch, novelist and critic
- Anthony Lawrence, poet
- Lucy Sussex, novelist and critic (born in Christchurch, New Zealand)
- Brenda Walker, novelist (died 2024)

== Deaths ==
A list, ordered by date of death (and, if the date is either unspecified or repeated, ordered alphabetically by surname) of deaths in 1957 of Australian literary figures, authors of written works or literature-related individuals follows, including year of birth.

- 29 June — Dorothy Cottrell, children's author, journalist, novelist (born 1902)
- 13 October – Will Lawson, poet and novelist (born 1876)
- 10 February – Bertha Southey Brammall, poet and novelist (born 1877)

== See also ==
- 1957 in Australia
- 1957 in literature
- 1957 in poetry
- List of years in Australian literature
- List of years in literature
