= 1957 in poetry =

Nationality words link to articles with information on the nation's poetry or literature (for instance, Irish or France).

== Events ==
- January 10 – T. S. Eliot marries his secretary Valerie Fletcher, almost 40 years his junior, in a private church ceremony.
- March 15 – Élet és Irodalom first published in Hungary as a literary magazine.
- March 25 – Copies of Allen Ginsberg's Howl and Other Poems (first published 1 November 1956) printed in England are seized by United States Customs Service officials in San Francisco on the grounds of obscenity. On October 3, in People v. Ferlinghetti, a subsequent prosecution of publisher Lawrence Ferlinghetti in the city, the work is ruled not to be obscene. The trial brings significant attention to the participants and other poets of the Beat Generation.
- Ginsberg surprises the literary world by abandoning San Francisco. After a spell in Morocco, he and Peter Orlovsky move to Paris, France, at the suggestion of Gregory Corso, who introduces them to a shabby lodging house above a bar at 9 rue Gît-le-Cœur kept by Mme Rachou, where they are soon joined by William S. Burroughs and others, including young painters, writers and black jazz musicians. The building becomes known as the "Beat Hotel". The writers' time here is a productive, creative period for many of them. Here, Ginsberg finishes his poem "Kaddish", Corso composes "Bomb" and "Marriage", and Burroughs (with Ginsberg and Corso's help) puts together the novel Naked Lunch from previous writings. Corso returns to New York in 1958; the "hotel" closes in 1963; and Ginsberg and Orlovsky leave for travels to India in 1967.
- Autumn – Black Mountain Review literary magazine folds.
- Shi'r ("Poetry") magazine is founded in Beirut by Syrian-born poets Yusuf al-Khal and 'Adunis'. The journal is a showcase for experimental Arabic poetry as well as translations of poetry from European languages.

== Works published in English ==
Listed by nation where the work was first published and again by the poet's native land, if different; substantially revised works listed separately:

=== Australia ===
- Gwen Harwood
  - "Last Meeting"
  - "Panther and Peacock"
- Leonard Mann – Elegiac and Other Poems

=== Canada ===
- Harry Ammos, Churchill and Other Poems
- Dick Diespecker, Windows West
- Joan Finnegan, through The Glass, Darkly
- Northrop Frye, Anatomy of Criticism: Four Essays, literary theory (Princeton University Press)
- Eldon Grier, The Ring of Ice
- Daryl Hine, The Carnal and the Crane
- D. G. Jones, Frost on the Sun
- Gordon Leclaire, Carpenter's Apprentice
- Dorothy Livesay, Selected Poems, 1926-1956
- Goodridge Macdonald, Recent Poems
- Jay Macpherson, The Boatman
- Marjorie Pickthall, The Selected Poems of Marjorie Pickthall, Lorne Pierce ed. (Toronto: McClelland & Stewart)
- James Reaney, A Suit of Nettles
- F. R. Scott, Events and Signals. Toronto: Ryerson Press.
- A. J. M. Smith ed.:
  - The Book of Canadian Poetry, third revised edition (anthology)
  - The Blasted Pine

=== India, in English ===
- Sri Aurobindo, posthumously published (died 1950):
  - Ilion ( Poetry in English ), Pondicherry: Sri Aurobindo Ashram
  - More Poems ( Poetry in English ), Pondicherry: Sri Aurobindo Ashram
- Nissim Ezekiel, A Time to Change and Other Poems ( Poetry in English )
- Dom Moraes, A Beginning ( Poetry in English )
- Manjeri Sundaraman, The Neem is a Lady and Other Poems ( Poetry in English ), Madras: Dhanus Pub.

=== New Zealand ===
- James K. Baxter, The Iron Breadboard: Studies in New Zealand Writing, a parody of 17 New Zealand poets, which some of his fellow poets greeted with acrimony
- James K. Baxter, Charles Doyle, Louis Johnson and Kendrick Smithyman, The Night Shift: Poems on Aspects of Love, Wellington: Capricorn Press
- Charles Brasch: The Estate, and Other Poems, Christchurch: Caxton Press
- Allen Curnow, Poems 1949–57
- Louis Johnson, New Worlds for Old
- W. H. Oliver, Fire Without Phoenix: Poems 1946–1954, Christchurch: Caxton Press

=== United Kingdom ===
- Dannie Abse, Tenants of the House, London: Hutchinson
- W. H. Auden, The Old Man's Road, English native in the United States
- George Barker, Collected Poems 1930–1955
- Edmund Blunden, Poems of Many Years
- Norman Cameron, collected works (posthumous)
- Charles Causley, Union Street
- Austin Clarke, Too Great a Vine (see also Ancient Lights 1955, The Horse-Eaters 1960)
- Donald Davie, A Winter Talent, and Other Poems, London: Routledge and Kegan Paul
- C. Day-Lewis, Pegasus, and Other Poems
- Kenneth Fearing, New and Selected Poems
- Roy Fuller, Brutus's Orchard
- Thom Gunn, The Sense of Movement, London: Faber and Faber; University of Chicago Press
- Donald Hall, Robert Pack and Louis Simpson, New Poets of England and America, anthology (Meridian Books)
- Ted Hughes, The Hawk in the Rain, including "The Thought Fox", London: Faber and Faber; New York: Harper
- James Kirkup:
  - The Descent into the Cave, and Other Poems
  - The Prodigal Son
- Louis MacNeice, Visitations
- Norman MacCaig, The Sinai Sort, London: Hogarth Press
- Edith Sitwell, collected works
- Stevie Smith, Not Waving but Drowning
- Anthony Thwaite, Home Truths
- Terence Tiller, Reading a Medal
- C. A. Trypanis, The Stones of Troy

==== Criticism, scholarship and biography in the United Kingdom ====
- T. S. Eliot, On Poetry and Poets

=== United States ===
- W. H. Auden, The Old Man's Road, English native in the United States
- Philip Booth, Letter from a Distant Land
- Hilda Doolittle (H.D.), Selected Poems of H.D.
- Richard Eberhart, Great Praises
- Robert Fitzgerald, In the Rose of Time
- George Garrett, The Reverend Ghost
- Donald Hall, Robert Pack and Louis Simpson, New Poets of England and America, anthology (Meridian Books)
- Daryl Hine, The Carnal and the Crane
- Robert E. Howard, Always Comes Evening
- Denise Levertov, Here and Now, City Lights Books
- William Meredith, The Open Sea and Other Poems
- W. S. Merwin, Green with Beasts
- Marianne Moore, Like a Bulwark
- Howard Moss, A Swimmer in the Air
- Ogden Nash, You Can't Get There from Here
- Frank O'Hara, Meditations in an Emergency, Grove Press
- Kenneth Patchen, Hurrah for Anything
- Marie Ponsot, True Minds
- Kenneth Rexroth, In Defense of the Earth
- Kenneth Rexroth and Lawrence Ferlinghetti, LP record, Poetry Readings in the Cellar (with the Cellar Jazz Quintet): Kenneth Rexroth & Lawrence Ferlinghetti Fantasy #7002 LP (Spoken Word)
- Muriel Rukeyser, One Life
- May Sarton, In Time Like Air
- William Jay Smith, Poems 1947–1957
- Wallace Stevens, Opus Posthumous, edited by Samuel French Morse; includes Owl's Clover (poems first published in 1936) and essays, including "The Irrational Element in Poetry," "The Whole Man: Perspectives," "Horizons," "Preface to Time of Year," "John Crowe Ransom: Tennessean," and "Adagia", Knopf (posthumous)
- Robert Penn Warren, Promises: Poems 1954-1956
- Richard Wilbur, Poems 1943–1956
- James Wright, The Green Wall

==== Criticism, scholarship and biography in the United States ====
- Annotated Index to the Cantos of Ezra Pound, the first guide to Pound's Cantos
- William Carlos Williams, The Selected Letters of William Carlos Williams, edited by John C. Thirwall
- William Butler Yeats, Variorum Edition of the Poems of W.B. Yeats, edited by Peter Allt and Russell K. Alspach, New York: Macmillan (posthumous)

=== Other in English ===
- D. Stewart and N. Keesing, editors, Old Bush Songs and Rhymes of Colonial Times, anthology (Australia)

== Works in other languages ==
Listed by language and often by nation where the work was first published and again by the poet's native land, if different; substantially revised works listed separately:

=== French language ===
==== Canada, in French ====
- Claude Fournier, Le Ciel fermé
- Pierre Trotier, Poèmes de Russie
- Reginald Boisvert, Le Temps de vivre
- Maurice Beaulieu, À glaise fendre
- Jean-Guy Pilon, L'homme et le jour, Montréal: l'Hexagone
- Rina Lasnier, Présence de l'absence

==== France ====
- Alain Bosquet, Premier Testament
- Frances de Dalmatie, Anamorphose
- Jean Follain, Tout instant
- Fernand Gregh, Le mal du monde
- Philippe Jaccottet, La Promenade sous les arbres* 1957 * Pierre Jean Jouve, Mélodrame
- Alphonse Métérié, Ephémères
- Henri Michaux, L'infini turbulent (translated into English as Miserable Miracle), about his experiences taking mescaline
- Pierre Oster, Solitude de la lumière
- Saint-John Perse, pen name of Marie-René Alexis Saint-Léger, Amers ("Seamarks"), Paris: Gallimard
- Tristan Tzara, pen name of Sami Rosenstock, Frère bois
- Tchicaya U Tam'si, Feu de brousse

==== Germany ====
- Hans Magnus Enzensberger, Verteidigung der Wölfe (his debut work)
- Peter Gan, Schachbrett
- Doris Mühringer, Gedichte I
- Margot Scharpenberg, Gefährliche Uebung
- Benno von Weise, editor, Die deutsche Lyrik: Form und Geschichte. Interpretationen ("German poetry: Form and history. Interpretations"), two volumes, Düsseldorf (criticism)

=== Hebrew ===
- N. Alterman, Ir ha-Yona ("City of the Dove")
- Moses ibn Ezra, Shirai ha-Kodesh le-Moshe Ibn Ezra ("The Sacred Poems of Moses Ibn Ezra"), edited by Simon Bernstein, the first comprehensive collection
- Ephraim Lisitzky, Negohot ma-Arafel ("Light through the Mist")
- Yaakov Schteinberg, Kol Kitvai Yaakov Schteinberg ("Complete Works")
- Aaron Zeitlin, Ben ha-Esh ve-Hayesha ("Between Fire and Redemption")

=== India ===
Listed in alphabetical order by first name:

- Felix Paul Noronha, Motyam Har written in the Konkani dialect of the Marathi language
- Sarachchandra Muktibodh, Yatrik, Marathi
- Subhas Mukhopadhyay, Phul Phutuk, Bengali

=== Portuguese language ===
==== Portugal ====
- Mário Cesariny de Vasconcelos, Pena Capital

==== Brazil ====
- Carlos Drummond de Andrade, Fala, amendoeira and Ciclo

=== Spanish language ===
==== Chile ====
- Gabriela Mistral, Recados: Contando a Chile, Santiago, Chile: Editorial del Pacífico
- Pablo Neruda:
  - Viajes
  - Nuevas odas elementales

==== Latin America ====
- Nellie Campobello, Tres poemas, Mexico
- Rosario Castellanos, Poemas (1953–1955)
- Arturo Corcuera, El grito del hombre, Peru
- Roque Dalton, Mía junto a los pájaros, San Salvador
- Jacinto Cordero Espinosa, Despojamiento
- Amado Nervo:
  - complete poetic works, publisher: Aguilar
  - Pensamientos, publisher: Barcelona
- Octavio Paz, Piedra de sol, Mexico
- César Vallejo, collected poems, posthumously published; Peru

==== Spain ====
- Vicente Aleixandre, Mis poemas mejores (1956)
- Gabriel Celaya, De claro en claro
- R. Montesino, La soledad y los días
- R. Pombo, Poesías completas
- María C. Lacaci, Humana voz (winner of the 1956 Adonaïs Prize)
- Jorge Guillén, "Lugar de Lázaro" (fragment of Clamor)
- Juan Ramón Jiménez:
  - Libros en poesía
  - Tercera antología poética

===== Spanish anthologies =====
- R. Menendez Pidal, editor, Espana y su historia
- J.M. Blecua, Floresta lírica espanola

=== Yiddish ===
- Jacob Glatstein, Fun mayn gantser mi ("Of All My Labor, Selected Poems, 1919-1956")
- Aaron Glanz-Leyeles, Baym fus fun barg ("At the Foot of the Mountain")
- Kehos Kliger, Peyzazhn fun Yisroel ("Israel Landscapes")

=== Other languages ===
- Eugenio Montale, La bufera e altro ("The Storm and Other Things"), a second, larger edition (original edition of 1,000 copies published in 1956), Milan: Arnaldo Mondadore Editore; Italy
- Máirtín Ó Direáin, Ó Mórna agus Dánta Eile, Irish
- Pier Paolo Pasolini, Le ceneri di Gramsci, Italy
- Wisława Szymborska, Wołanie do Yeti ("Calling Out to Yeti"), Poland

== Awards and honors ==
=== Australia ===
- Grace Leven Prize for Poetry: Leonard Mann, Elegiac and Other Poems

=== Canada ===
- Governor General's Awards: Robert A.D. Ford, A Window on the North
- President's Medal for a single poem: Jay Macpherson, The Fisherman — A Book of Riddles

=== United Kingdom ===
- Queen's Gold Medal for Poetry: Siegfried Sassoon
- Guinness Poetry Awards: Vernon Watkins, The Tributary Seasons; Cecil Day-Lewis, Moods of Love; Roy Fuller, Seven Mythological Sonnets

=== United States ===
- National Book Award for Poetry: Richard Wilbur, Things of this World
- Pulitzer Prize for Poetry: Things of This World by Richard Wilbur
- Bollingen Prize: Allen Tate
- Fellowship of the Academy of American Poets: Conrad Aiken
- Robert Frost Fellowship in Poetry: May Swenson
- Yale Series of Younger Poets Award: James Wright for The Green Wall

==== Poetry Magazine awards ====
- Levinson Prize: Thom Gunn
- Oscar Blumenthal Prize: William Carlos Williams
- Eunice Tietjens Prize: James Wright
- Bess Hokin Prize: Philip Booth
- Union League Civic and Arts Foundation prize: Anne Ridler
- Vachel Lindsay Prize:
- Harriet Monroe Memorial Prize: John Ciardi

==== Poetry Society of America awards ====
- Alexander Droutzkoy Memorial award: Mark Van Doren
- Walt Whitman Award: Fredson Bowers
- Reynolds Lyric Award: Frances Minturn Howard and David Ross
- Edna St. Vincent Millay Memorial Award: Richard Wilbur
- William Rose Benet Memorial Award]]: Babette Deutsch
- Ridgely Torrence Memorial Award: John Hall Wheelock
- Poetry Chap-Book Award: Grover Smith, Jr.
- Emily S. Hamblen Memorial Award: Trianon Press of Paris for a work on William Blake
- Arthur Davison Ficke Memorial Award: Margaret Haley Carpenter, Leah Bodine Drake, Frances Minturn Howard, Ulrich Troubetzkoy
- Leonora Speyer Memorial Award: Lois Smith Hiers
- Annual Award: Joyce Horner
- Borestone Mountain Poetry Award: Eric Barker

=== Other ===
- Fastenrath Prize (Spain) for the best poetry published in the past four years: J. García Nieto, La red

== Births ==
Death years link to the corresponding "[year] in poetry" article:

- January 13 – Claudia Emerson (died 2014), American winner of the 2006 Pulitzer Prize for Poetry
- March 23 – Ananda Devi, Mauritian francophone fiction writer and poet
- April 16 – Essex Hemphill (died 1995), gay African-American poet and activist
- April 23 – Bruce Meyer, Canadian poet and educator
- August – Martín Espada, American poet and professor at the University of Massachusetts Amherst, where he teaches creative writing and Latino poetry.
- August 15 – Michael Hofmann, German-English poet and translator from German
- August 19 – Li-Young Lee, American poet born in Jakarta, Indonesia to Chinese parents
- October 17 – Uwe Kolbe, German
- October 21 – Attila the Stockbroker (John Baine), English punk and performance poet
- November 8 – Afua Cooper, Jamaican-born Canadian dub poet, sociologist and historian (migrates to Canada in 1980)
- November 12 – Malcolm Guite, Nigerian-born English poet, singer-songwriter, Anglican priest and academic
- December 12 – Brenda Marie Osbey, American
- Also:
  - Cyrus Cassells, American
  - Valerio Magrelli, Italian
  - Anthony Molino, American poet, translator, anthropologist and psychoanalyst
  - Sayed Hasmat Jalal, Bengali poet, short-story writer and journalist
  - Oliver Reynolds, British
  - Alan Riach, Scottish poet and academic
  - Haris Vlavianos, Greek

== Deaths ==
Birth years link to the corresponding "[year] in poetry" article:

- January 10 – Gabriela Mistral (Lucila Godoy Alcayaga), 67 (born 1889), Chilean poet, diplomat, educator and feminist, winner of the Nobel Prize in Literature in 1945)
- January 13
  - A. E. Coppard (born 1878), English short story writer and poet
  - Saishū Onoe 尾上柴舟 (born 1876), Japanese tanka poet and calligrapher
- February 13 – F. W. Harvey, 68 (born 1888), English rural poet and soldier
- April 22 – Roy Campbell, 56 (born 1901), South African poet and satirist
- March 11 – Jinzai Kiyoshi 神西清 (born 1903), Japanese, Shōwa period novelist, translator, literary critic, poet and playwright
- March 25 – A. R. D. Fairburn (born 1904), New Zealand poet
- March 28 – Christopher Morley, 66 (born 1890), American journalist, novelist and poet
- June 15 – Skipwith Cannell (born 1887), American poet associated with the Imagist group (pronounce his last name with the stress on the second syllable)
- August 4 – Ivan Zorman, 72 (born 1885), Slovene-born poet and composer
- August 13 – Joseph Warren Beach (born 1880), American author, book critic and educator
- August 26 – Umberto Saba, 74 (born 1883), Italian poet and fiction writer
- September 20 – Merrill Moore, 54 (born 1903), American psychiatrist and poet
- September 22 – Oliver St. John Gogarty, 79 (born 1878), Irish poet, writer, physician and ear surgeon, one of the most prominent Dublin wits, political figure of the Irish Free State, best known as the inspiration for Buck Mulligan in James Joyce's novel Ulysses, of a heart attack
- September 26 – Charles Badger Clark (born 1883), American poet
- October 23 – Mihai Codreanu (born 1876), Romanian
- October 26 – Nikos Kazantzakis (born 1883), Greek
- December 25 – Stanley Vestal (born 1877), American writer, poet and historian

== See also ==
- Poetry
- List of poetry awards
- List of years in poetry
