= Shinji Nagatomo =

Japanese politician

- 長友 慎治

Member of the House of Representatives
- Incumbent
- Assumed office 1 November 2021
- Preceded by: Multi-member district
- Constituency: Kyushu PR (2021–2026); Miyazaki 2nd (2026–present)

Personal details
- Born: 22 June 1977 (age 49) Miyazaki, Miyazaki Prefecture, Japan
- Party: DPP
- Education: Waseda University
- Website: Shinji Nagatomo website

Shinji Nagatomo (長友 慎治, Nagatomo Shinji; born 22 June 1977) is a Japanese politician of the Democratic Party For the People, who serves as a member of the House of Representatives.

== Early years ==
Born and raised in Miyazaki City, Miyazaki Prefecture in 1977.

In March 2002, Nagatomo graduated from the Faculty of Law at Waseda University and began working as a freelance journalist in October of the same year.

In June 2009, Nagatomo established a content production company and assumed the role of CEO.

In April 2012, Nagatomo joined Hakuhodo Kettle, where he was responsible for PR consulting and other related services.

In October 2016, Nagatomo returned to his hometown in Miyazaki Prefecture and was appointed Director of the Hyūga City Business Support Center.

== Political career ==
In 2020, DPP nominated Nagatomo as Miyazaki 2nd district's candidate.

In the 2021 general election, he lost to LDP incumbent Taku Etō but won a seat in Kyushu PR.

In the 2024 general election, Nagatomo lost to LDP's Etō after a close race and won a seat in Kyushu PR.

In the 2026 general election, Nagatomo defeated LDP's Etō after a close race because of Eto's slip of a tongue about rice when he had been Minister of Agriculture, Forestry and Fisheries.
