= Melanella musta =

Scientific classification
- Kingdom: Animalia
- Phylum: Mollusca
- Class: Gastropoda
- Subclass: Caenogastropoda
- Order: Littorinimorpha
- Family: Eulimidae
- Genus: Melanella
- Species: †M. musta

Binomial name
- †Melanella musta (Yokoyama, 1928)

Synonyms
- † Eulima musta Yokoyama, 1928 superseded combination

Species of gastropod

Melanella musta is an extinct species of sea snail, a marine gastropod mollusk in the family Eulimidae.

== Description ==
The length of the shell attains 1.5 mm.

== Distribution ==
Fossils of this species were found in Pliocene strata in Hyūga, Miyazaki, Japan.
