= Bokusui Wakayama =

- 若山 牧水
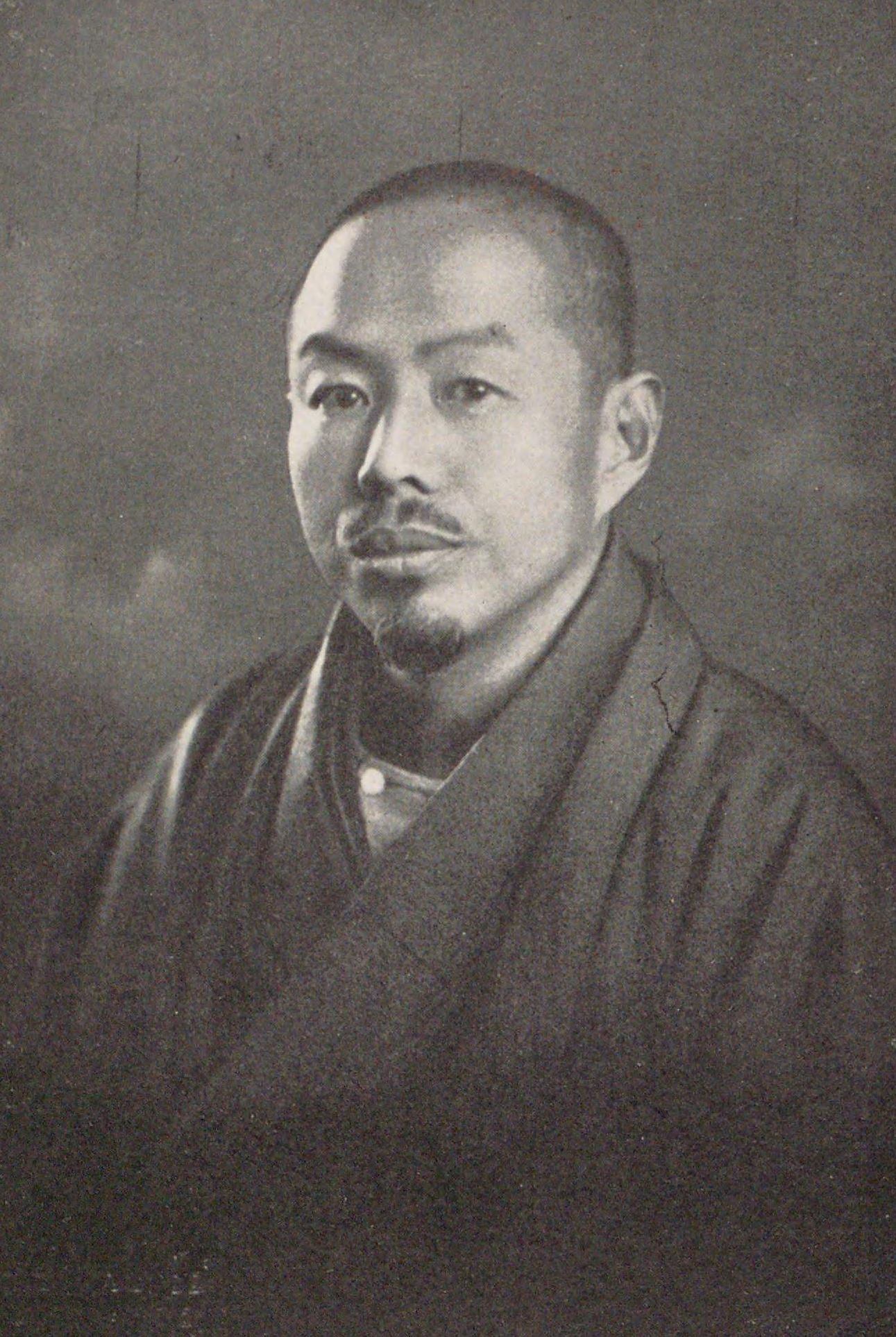
- Wakayama Bokusui
- Born: Wakayama Shigeru; August 24, 1885; Togo, Miyazaki, Japan
- Died: September 17, 1928 (aged 43); Numazu, Shizuoka, Japan
- Education: Waseda University
- Occupation: Poet

Japanese name
- Kanji: 若山 牧水
- Hiragana: わかやま ぼくすい
Transcriptions
- Romanization: Wakayama Bokusui

Bokusui Wakayama (Note: Japanese pronunciation: [β̞ä̀.kä́.jä̀.mä̀ | bó̞.kɯ̥̈.sɯ̈̀ì, -jä́.mä́ bó̞.kɯ̥̈.sɯ̈̀ì, -jä̀.mä̀ | bò̞.kɯ̥̈.sɯ̈́í, -jä̀.mä̀ bò̞.kɯ̥̈.sɯ̈̀ì]) (若山 牧水, Wakayama Bokusui; August 24, 1885 – September 17, 1928) was the pen-name of Shigeru Wakayama (若山 繁, Wakayama Shigeru), a Japanese author noted for his poetry in pre-World War II Japan.

== Life ==
Wakayama was born in Togo, Miyazaki, (now part of the city of Hyūga) as the eldest son of a doctor. He became interested in poetry from middle school, taking the name of "Bokusui" from the age of 18. He entered Waseda University in 1904, where one of his classmates was Hakushu Kitahara. After graduation, he was hired by the Chuo Shimbun newspaper in 1909, but quit after only five months.

He decided to devote himself to poetry, and became a disciple of Saishū Onoe. He traveled all over Japan and Korea, composing many tanka about the places he visited. He settled in Numazu, Shizuoka in 1920. He also loved sake, and heavy drinking eventually resulted in cirrhosis of the liver. He died in 1928.

Before he died he wrote a death haiku that reads:

Jisei nado
zansetsu ni ka mo
nakarikeri

Translation:

A parting word?
The melting snow
is odorless.

== Works ==
=== Poetry books ===
1. Umi no Koe (海の声) (published July 1908)
2. Hitori Uta e Ru (独り歌へる) (published January 1910)
3. Betsuri (別離) (published April 1910)
4. Rojō (路上) (published September 1911)
5. Shi ka Gejutsu ka (死か芸術か) (published September 1912)
6. Minakami (みなかみ) (published September 1913)
7. Shūfū no Uta (秋風の歌) (published April 1914)
8. Sakyū (砂丘) (published October 1915)
9. Asa no Uta (朝の歌) (published June 1916)
10. Shiraumeshū (白梅集) (published August 1917)
11. Sabishiki Jumoku (さびしき樹木) (published July 1918)
12. Keikokushū (渓谷集) (published May 1918)
13. Kuro Tsuchi (くろ土) (published March 1921)
14. Yamazakura no Uta (山桜の歌) (published May 1923)
15. Kuromatsu (黒松) (published September 1938)
