= Rosemary Wighton =

Australian author, editor and adviser on women's affairs

Rosemary Wighton AO
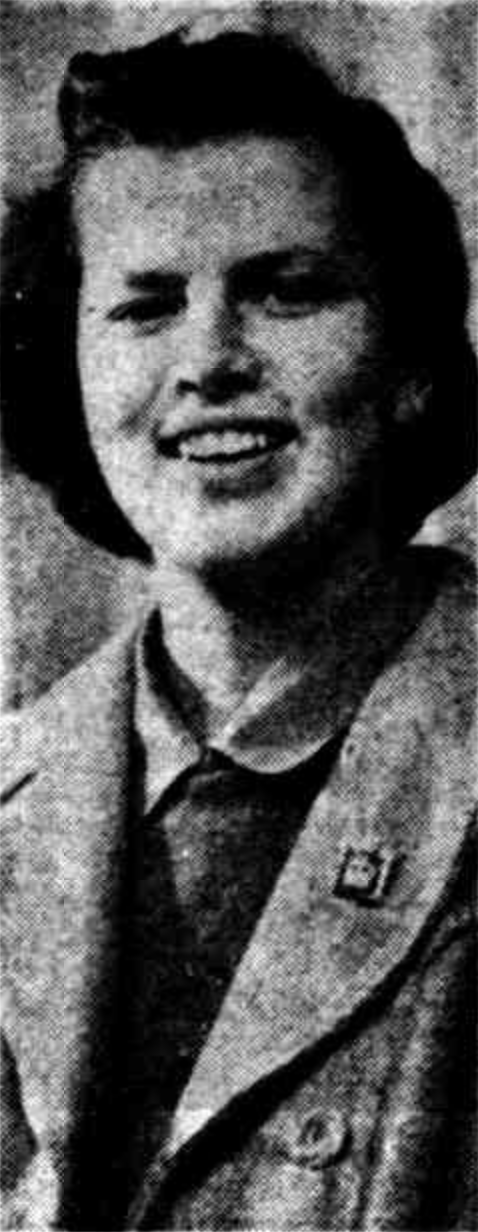
- Rosemary Blackburn in 1943
- Born: Rosemary Neville Blackburn; 6 January 1925; St Peters, Adelaide, South Australia
- Died: 7 February 1994 (aged 69); North Adelaide, South Australia
- Education: University of Adelaide
- Relatives: Arthur Seaforth Blackburn (father)
- Writing career
- Pen name: Martha Lemming
- Notable works: Early Australian Children's Literature (1963); Peeling the Onion: The Story of a Family (1993)
- Notable awards: John Howard Clark prize

Rosemary Neville Wighton AO (6 January 1925 – 7 February 1994) was an Australian literary editor, author and adviser to the South Australian government on women's affairs.

== Early life and education ==
Rosemary Neville Wighton was born on 6 January 1925, the third child of Arthur Seaforth and Rose Ada (née Kelly) Blackburn. Her father was the first South Australian to be awarded the Victoria Cross.

She was educated at the Wilderness School before attending the University of Adelaide, graduating with a Bachelor of Arts (honours).

== Career ==
Following graduation, Wighton tutored in English at the University of Adelaide in 1946. Wighton married Dugald Wighton in St Peter's College Chapel on 22 May 1948. After her marriage, between 1950 and 1958, she tutored part-time at the university.

In 1961, she and Max Harris became founding editors of the Australian Book Review, while from 1963 she was joint editor of Australian Letters until its closure in 1968. From 1971 to 1979, Wighton lectured at the Salisbury College of Advanced Education, specialising in children's literature.

She was appointed to the Literature Board in 1974 and chaired it from 1984 to 1988.

In 1979 she wrote the introduction to a facsimile edition of A Mother's Offering to her Children by Charlotte Barton. This book is believed to be the first Australian book for children, originally published in 1841.

From 1979 to 1984 she was adviser on women's affairs to the South Australian premier. In July 1983 she was appointed member of the Family Law Council by Attorney-General Gareth Evans.

== Works ==
- Early Australian Children's Literature, Lansdowne, 1963
- Kangaroo Tales: A Collection of Australian Stories for Children, selected by Rosemary Wighton, with illustrations by Donald Friend, Penguin, 1963
- Peeling the Onion: The Story of a Family, self-published, 1993 ISBN 0646144790

== Awards and recognition ==
At the University of Adelaide she won the Roby Fletcher Prize for Psychology in 1942. In her final year she received first-class honours in English and won the John Howard Clark prize.

In the 1988 Queen's Birthday Honours Wighton was appointed an Officer of the Order of Australia (AO) for "public service, to literature and to the community".
