= Takami Eto =

Japanese politician (1925–2007)

- 江藤 隆美
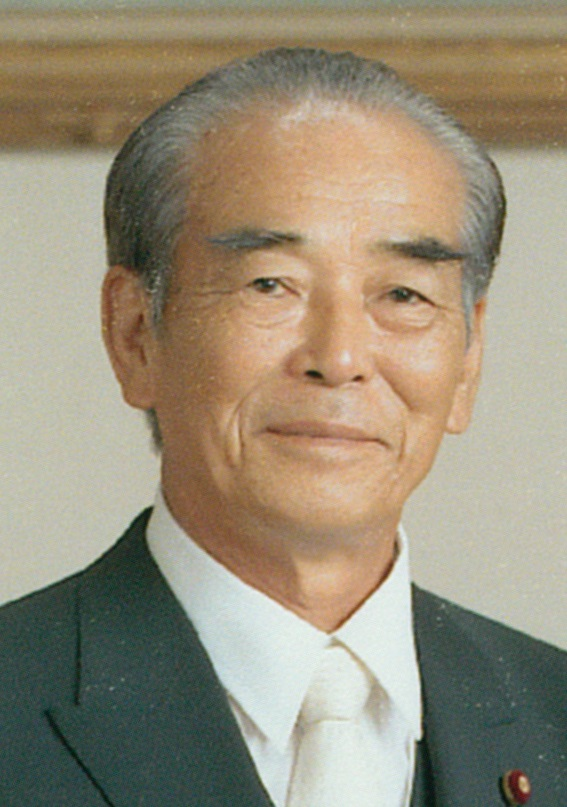
- Takami Eto

Director-General of the Management and Coordination Agency
- In office 8 August 1995 – 13 November 1995
- Prime Minister: Tomiichi Murayama
- Preceded by: Tsuruo Yamaguchi
- Succeeded by: Masaaki Nakayama

Minister of Transport
- In office 10 August 1989 – 28 February 1990
- Prime Minister: Toshiki Kaifu
- Preceded by: Shinjirō Yamamura
- Succeeded by: Akira Ōno

Minister of Construction
- In office 28 December 1985 – 22 July 1986
- Prime Minister: Yasuhiro Nakasone
- Preceded by: Yoshiaki Kibe
- Succeeded by: Kōsei Amano

Member of the House of Representatives
- In office 19 July 1993 – 10 October 2003
- Preceded by: Toshihisa Matsuura
- Succeeded by: Taku Etō
- Constituency: Miyazaki 1st (1993–1996); Miyazaki 2nd (1996–2003)
- In office 28 December 1969 – 24 January 1990
- Preceded by: Yoshimitsu Kawano
- Succeeded by: Toshihisa Matsuura
- Constituency: Miyazaki 1st

Member of the Miyazaki Prefectural Assembly
- In office 1955–1967

Personal details
- Born: 10 April 1925 Hyūga, Miyazaki, Japan
- Died: 22 November 2007 (aged 82) Ho Chi Minh City, Vietnam
- Party: Liberal Democratic
- Children: Taku Etō

Takami Eto (江藤 隆美, Etō Takami; 10 April 1925 – 22 November 2007) was a Japanese politician and former member of Japan's House of Representatives.

== Career ==
Born in Hyūga, Miyazaki, Takami Eto studied at the Tomitaka business school (now Kadokawa High School), and graduated the Miyazaki Agriculture and Forestry College (now University of Miyazaki). After graduation, he ran for the Miyazaki prefecture assembly, and was elected three terms.

A conservative politician, Takami Etō joined in 1973 the political club Seirankai (青嵐会 - 'Mountain wind') founded by Shintaro Ishihara, one of Japan's most prominent "far right" politicians. He was called "Japan's Le Pen" on a program broadcast on Australia's ABC.

Eto was once considered a major power broker in Japan's Liberal Democratic Party.

Eto served as the Japanese construction minister during the early 1990s, but resigned from the Management and Coordination Agency in 1995 following controversial comments regarding Japan's treatment of occupied countries during World War II.

Etō retired from politics in 2003.

Takami Etō was found dead in his hotel in Ho Chi Minh City, Vietnam, on November 22, 2007. He was 82 years old when he died and had been in Vietnam on a private agriculturally related visit. Japan's Kyodo News reported that Etō had died of an apparent heart attack.

== Historical negationism ==
Etō was known for his negationist views, and his denial of Japanese war crimes. He resigned from his post as minister in 1995 following comments in which he stated that Japan "did some good things" when it governed Korea, including building railroads, roads and schools. Etō's comments threatened to cancel an important summit between South Korea's then President Kim Young-sam, whose government objected to Etō's comments, and then Japanese Prime Minister Tomiichi Murayama, a socialist who led Japan's coalition government, before Etō's resignation.

Additionally, Etō defended the 1910 Japan-Korea Annexation Treaty which gave Japan control over Korea. He stated in a speech, "Why was the country-to-country treaty called an invasion?...What's the difference between that and a merger of a town and a village?" Etō also actively lobbied against school textbooks which mentioned so-called "comfort women" Comfort women were women from across Asia, including Koreans, whom Japanese troops forced into sexual slavery during World War II.

Etō also denied the existence of the Nanjing Massacre, which he considered to be a hoax.

== Transmission of power and views to his son ==
Takami Etō's son, Taku Etō, took his father's seat in the House of Representatives of Japan. Taku Eto is affiliated to the openly revisionist lobby Nippon Kaigi, which advocates a restoration of monarchy in the archipelago and negates the existence of Japanese war crimes. He was among the 86 MPs invited to the meeting for the 'one million people rally to protect the Imperial tradition' in March 2006, and among the people who signed 'THE FACTS', an ad published in The Washington Post on June 14, 2007, in order to protest against United States House of Representatives House Resolution 121, and to deny the existence of sexual slavery for the Imperial military ('Comfort women').

Party political offices
Preceded by Motoharu Morishita	Chairman of the Diet Policy Committee, Liberal Democratic Party; 1984-1985	Succeeded by Takao Fujinami
Preceded by Hikosaburō Okonogi	Chairman of the Diet Policy Committee, Liberal Democratic Party; 1983-1984	Succeeded by Motoharu Morishita
Political offices
Preceded by Tsuruo Yamaguchi	Director-General of the Management and Coordination Agency; 1995	Succeeded by Masaaki Nakayama
Preceded by Shinjirō Yamamura	Minister of Transportation; 1989-1990	Succeeded by Akira Ōno
Preceded by Yoshiaki Kibe	Minister of Construction; 1985-1986	Succeeded by Kōsei Amano
