= Japan National Route 328 =

Road in Kagoshima prefecture, Japan

National Route 328
- 国道328号
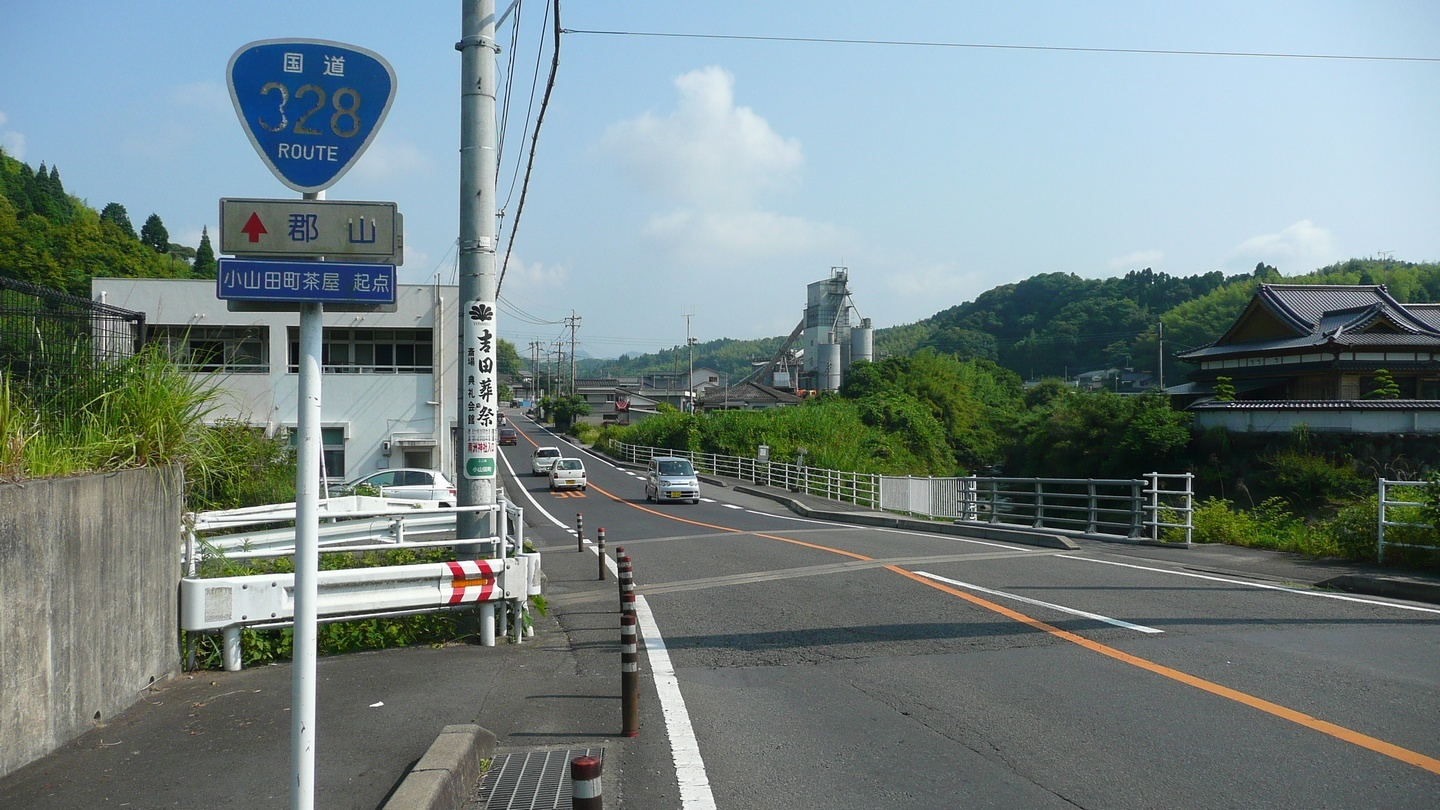

Route information
- Length: 64.4 km (40.0 mi)

Location
- Country: Japan

Highway system
- National highways of Japan; Expressways of Japan
| ← National Route 327 | → National Route 329 |

National Route 328 is a national highway of Japan connecting the cities of Kagoshima and Izumi in Kagoshima prefecture, with a total length of 64.4 km (40.02 mi).
