= Taku Etō =

Japanese politician (born 1960)

- 江藤 拓
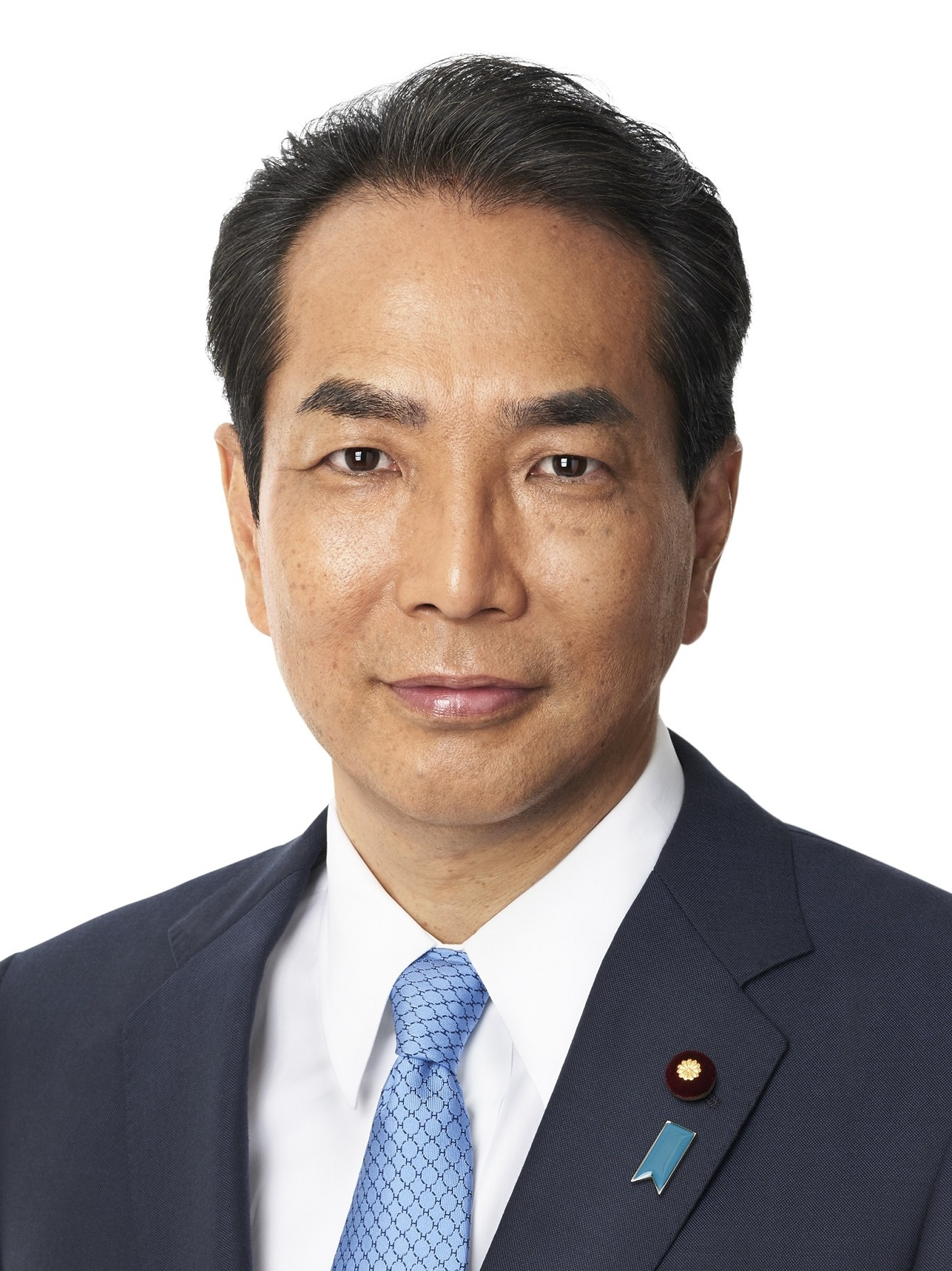
- Official portrait, 2021

Minister of Agriculture, Forestry and Fisheries
- In office 11 November 2024 – 21 May 2025
- Prime Minister: Shigeru Ishiba
- Preceded by: Yasuhiro Ozato
- Succeeded by: Shinjirō Koizumi
- In office 11 September 2019 – 16 September 2020
- Prime Minister: Shinzo Abe
- Preceded by: Takamori Yoshikawa
- Succeeded by: Kōtarō Nogami

Member of the House of Representatives
- Incumbent
- Assumed office 10 November 2003
- Preceded by: Takami Eto
- Constituency: Miyazaki 2nd (2003–2026); Kyushu PR (2026–present)

Personal details
- Born: 1 July 1960 (age 66) Hyuga, Miyazaki, Japan
- Party: Liberal Democratic (2003–2005; 2006–present)
- Other political affiliations: Independent (2005–2006)
- Parent: Takami Eto (father)
- Education: Seijo University
- Website: eto-taku.jp

Taku Etō (Japanese: 江藤 拓, Hepburn: Etō Taku; born July 1, 1960) is a Japanese politician who has served as a member of the House of Representatives since 2003. He previously served as the Minister of Agriculture, Forestry and Fisheries in the Cabinet of Prime Minister Shinzo Abe and again in the Cabinet of Shigeru Ishiba.

== Career ==
A native of Kadogawa, Miyazaki and graduate of Seijo University, Etō was elected to the house for the first time in 2003, succeeding his father, Takami Eto, a former government minister.

Taku Etō's profile on the LDP website:

- Secretary to a Diet Member
- Parliamentary Secretary for Agriculture, Forestry and Fisheries (Fukuda Cabinet)
- Acting Director, Agriculture and Forestry Division of LDP
- Director, Committee on Agriculture, Forestry and Fisheries of Diet
- Senior Vice Minister of Agriculture, Forestry and Fisheries of LDP's Shadow Cabinet
- Senior Vice Minister of Agriculture, Forestry and Fisheries

=== 2025 gaffe and resignation ===
On 18 May 2025, Etō was criticized after saying at a local LDP meeting in Saga Prefecture that he did not need to buy rice because he received so much of it from supporters amid rising prices. He was ordered to explain his remarks by Prime Minister Shigeru Ishiba, who called them "very problematic", and apologized over the incident. Etō later said that he was ashamed, but expressed intent to continue as agriculture minister. Five opposition parties demanded that he be replaced, threatening a vote of no-confidence against him if Ishiba did not comply. On 21 May, Ishiba dismissed Etō and replaced him with Shinjirō Koizumi.

== Positions ==
Etō gave the following answers to the questionnaire submitted by Mainichi to parliamentarians in 2012:

- in favor of the revision of the Constitution
- in favor of the right to collective self-defense and the revision of Article 9
- in favor of reforming the National Diet to make it unicameral instead of bicameral
- no answer for the reactivation of nuclear power plants
- no answer for achieving zero nuclear power by the 2030s
- in favor of the relocation of Marine Corps Air Station Futenma in Okinawa
- no answer for evaluating the purchase of the Senkaku Islands by the Government
- no answer for a strong attitude against China
- against the participation of Japan in the Trans-Pacific Partnership
- against a nuclear-armed Japan
- against reforming the Imperial House of Japan to allow women to retain their Imperial status after marriage

Etō is affiliated with the ultraconservative lobby group Nippon Kaigi. In March 2006, he was among 86 members of the Diet who were invited to attend a group meeting at the Nippon Budokan that called for preserving the traditions of the Imperial family.
