= Japan National Route 327 =

Road in Japan

National Route 327
- 国道327号

Route information
- Length: 97.5 km (60.6 mi)

Location
- Country: Japan

Highway system
- National highways of Japan; Expressways of Japan
← National Route 326	→ National Route 328

National Route 327 is a national highway of Japan connecting Hyūga, Miyazaki and Aso, Kumamoto in Japan, with a total length of 97.5 km (60.58 mi).

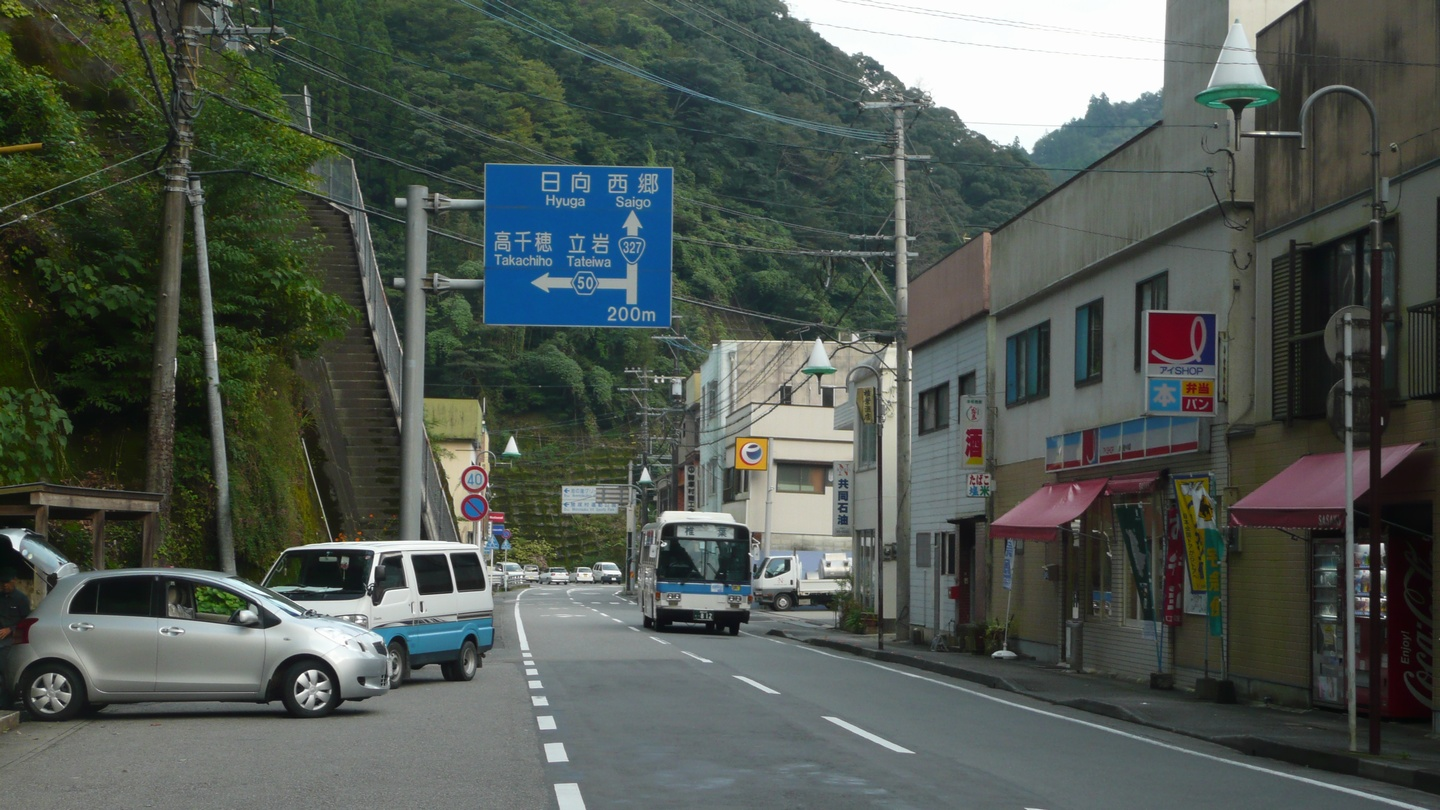
Morotsuka Village, Miyazaki

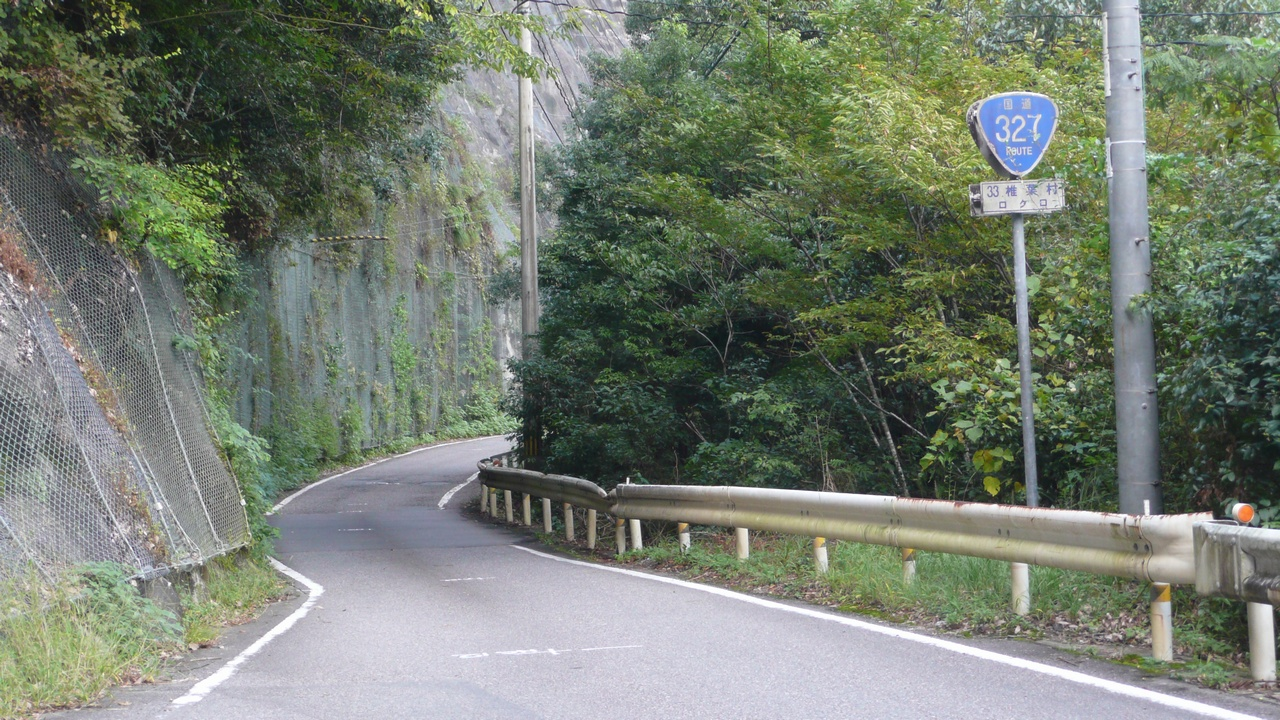
Shiiba village, Miyazaki
