= Flesh in Armour =

Book by Leonard Mann

- Author: Leonard Mann
- Language: English
- Genre: Novel
- Publisher: Phaedrus Books, Australia
- Publication date: 1932
- Publication place: Australia
- Media type: Print
- Pages: 349
- Followed by: Human Drift

Flesh in Armour (1932) is a novel by Australian author Leonard Mann. It won the ALS Gold Medal for Best Novel in 1932.

== Plot summary ==
The novel follows the exploits of an Australian platoon fighting in France in World War I, and, in particular, those of one of the company, Corporal Frank Jeffreys.

== Notes ==
- Austlit states: "Leonard Mann privately published his first novel, Flesh in Armour, in Melbourne in 1932, after he was unable to place it with a publisher in Australia or England. The novel was an immediate success, and Mann was subsequently awarded the Australian Literature Society's gold medal for outstanding book of the year. The book's merits then established, it was republished in England and Australia in 1944."

== Reviews ==
The novel was initially met with mixed reviews: generally appreciative of the material but critical of the language depicted. A reviewer in Perth's Sunday Times stated: "A distinct literary ability is revealed in the scenes in action and in the support lines, which chapters are a masterpiece of descriptive work, but the merit of the story as a whole is spoilt by the sensual episodes and by digger dialogue of the crude and obscene sort, the author apparently overlooking the fact that some of the finest brains of the earth looked at the war through the eyes of infantry privates."

The Telegraph in Brisbane, however, saw beyond the dialogue to the merits of the novel: "Here is the real Aussie, colloquial language and all, scornful of authority, loyal to the backbone whenever the call to action comes, and ready for any devilment in the hours out of the trenches."

By the end of World War II it was being appreciated as a major piece of Australian war literature with a critic in The Age stating: "It pulses with life, that, together with the accuracy of its descriptions, has raised the novel above many others of its kind. In straightforward narrative style it enshrines perhaps as competently as could an epic poem, the spirit of the 'Digger'."

== Awards and nominations ==
- 1932 winner ALS Gold Medal
