= The Boomerang Book of Legendary Tales =

Book by Enid Moodie Heddle

- Author: Enid Moodie Heddle
- Language: English
- Genre: Children's fiction
- Publisher: Longmans Green
- Publication date: 1957
- Publication place: Australia
- Media type: Print
- Pages: 150pp
- Preceded by: The Boomerang Book of Australian Poetry
- Followed by: A Galaxy of Poems, Old and New

The Boomerang Book of Legendary Tales (1957) is an anthology of indigenous myths and legends for children, compiled by Australian author Enid Moodie Heddle, illustrated by Nancy Parker. It won the Children's Book of the Year Award: Older Readers in 1957.

== Plot outline ==
This anthology contains a selection of Australian Aboriginal legends, and myths from New Zealand, Fiji, New Guinea, Tonga, Borneo, Micronesia and the Solomon Islands.

== Critical reception ==
In a survey of possible Christmas book gifts for children in The Age in 1957, Dennis Dugan noted: "Miss Moodie Heddle has drawn on the work of such writers as Mrs. Langloh Parker, Mervyn Skipper, Roland Robinson, Eve Grey, Dal Stivens and Lance Skuthorpe for this excellent collection."

== See also ==
- 1957 in Australian literature
