= Japan National Route 326 =

Road in Japan

National Route 326
- 国道326号
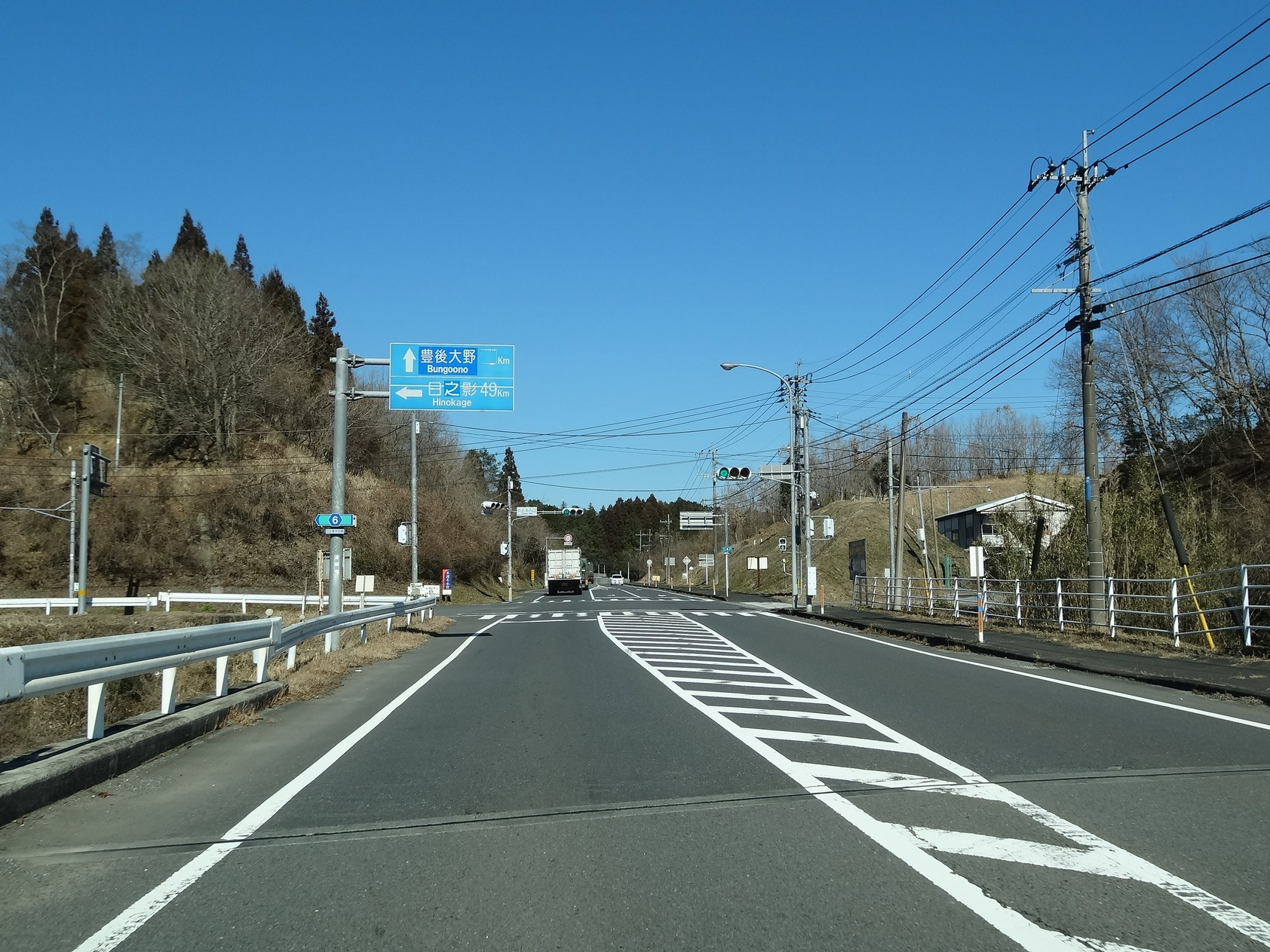

Route information
- Length: 68.3 km (42.4 mi)

Location
- Country: Japan

Highway system
- National highways of Japan; Expressways of Japan
← National Route 325	→ National Route 327

National Route 326 is a national highway of Japan connecting Nobeoka, Miyazaki and Bungo-ōno, Ōita in Japan, with a total length of 68.3 km (42.44 mi).

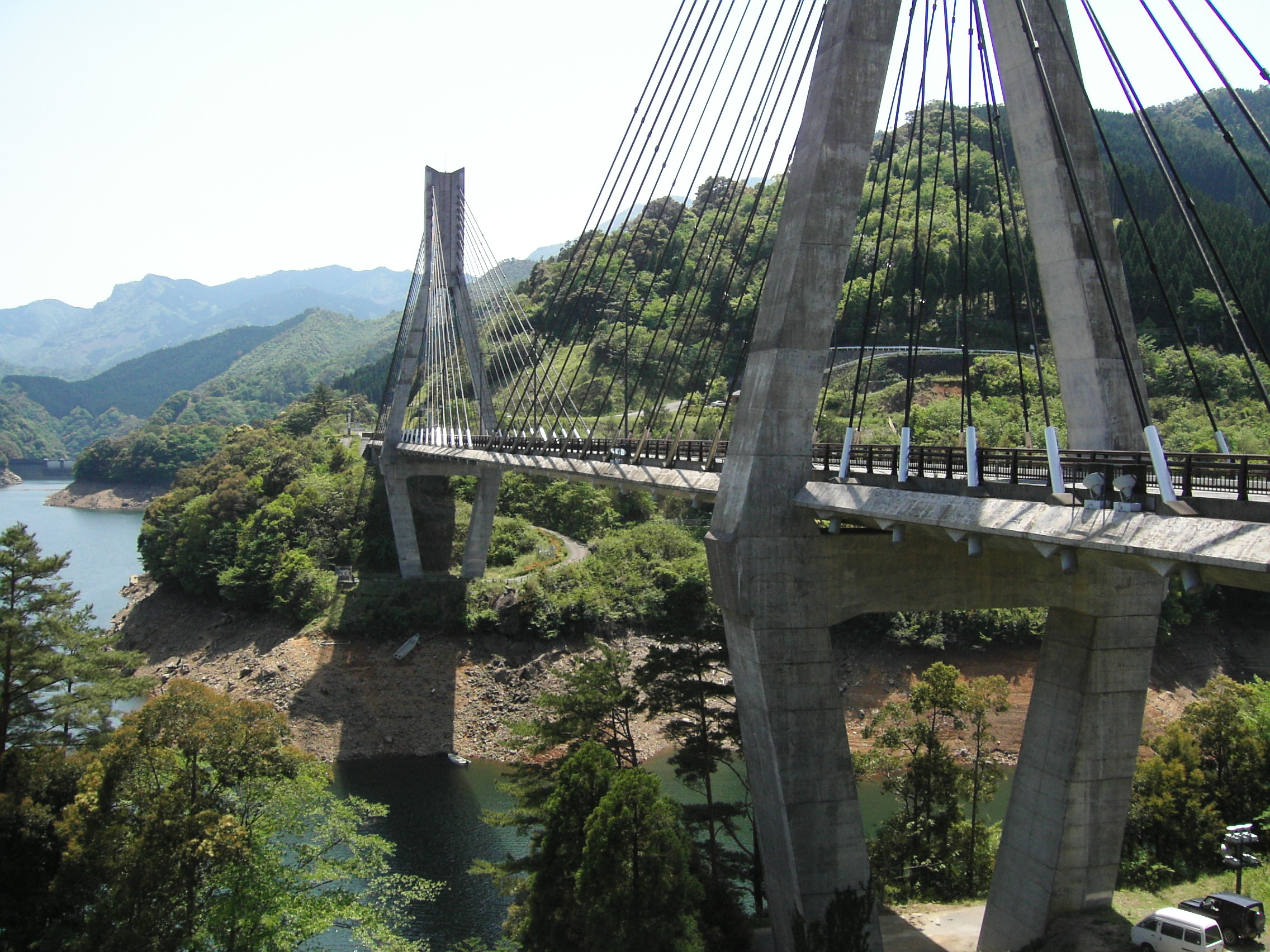
The Utagenka Bridge crosses over the Kitagawa Dam, Saiki
