= Miyazaki 2nd district =

Legislative district of Japan

- Parliamentary constituency for the Japanese House of Representatives
- Numbered map of Miyazaki Prefecture single-member districts
- Prefecture: Miyazaki
- Proportional District: Kyushu
- Electorate: 266,489

Current constituency
- Created: 1994
- Seats: One
- Party: DPP
- Representatives: Shinji Nagatomo
- Municipalities: Hyuga, Nobeoka, Saito, Higashiusuki District, Koyu District and Nishiusuki District

Miyazaki 2nd district (宮崎県第2区, Miyazaki-ken dai-niku or simply 宮崎2区, Miyazaki-niku ) is a single-member constituency of the House of Representatives in the national Diet of Japan located in Miyazaki Prefecture.

In the LDP landslide victory in 2026, the Miyazaki 2nd was the only district in which an opposition candidate defeated the incumbent Liberal Democratic Party member.

== Areas covered ==
=== Since 1994 ===
- Hyuga
- Nobeoka
- Saito
- Higashiusuki District
- Koyu District
- Nishiusuki District

== List of representatives ==
Election	Representative	Party	Notes
1996	Takami Eto	Liberal Democratic	
2000	Takami Eto	Liberal Democratic	
2003	Taku Etō	Independent	
2003	Taku Etō	Liberal Democratic	
2005	Taku Etō	Independent	
2005	Taku Etō	Liberal Democratic	
2009	Taku Etō	Liberal Democratic	
2012	Taku Etō	Liberal Democratic	
2014	Taku Etō	Liberal Democratic	
2017	Taku Etō	Liberal Democratic	
2021	Taku Etō	Liberal Democratic	
2024	Taku Etō	Liberal Democratic	
2026	Shinji Nagatomo	DPP	

== Election results ==
2026
Party	Candidate	Votes	%	±%
DPP	Shinji Nagatomo	73,994	50.7	▲7.4
LDP	Taku Etō (incumbent) (elected in Kyushu PR block)	65,630	45.0	▼7.4
JCP	Yoshitomo Shirae	6,325	4.3	▲0
Registered electors		257,031		
Turnout			58.35	▲3.23
DPP gain from LDP				

2024
Party	Candidate	Votes	%	±%
Liberal Democratic (endorsed by Komeito)	Taku Etō (incumbent)	74,367	52.34	
DPP	Shinji Nagatomo (elected in Kyushu PR block)	61,603	43.36	
JCP	Yoshitomo Shirae	6,113	4.30	New
Majority		12,764	8.98	
Registered electors		261,788		
Turnout		142,083	55.12	▼1.16
LDP hold				

2021
Party	Candidate	Votes	%	±%
Liberal Democratic (endorsed by Komeito)	Taku Etō (incumbent)	94,156	62.20	
DPP (endorsed by SDP)	Shinji Nagatomo (won PR seat)	57,210	37.80	New
Majority		36,946	24.40	
Registered electors		273,071		
Turnout			56.28	▲4.59
LDP hold				

2017
Party	Candidate	Votes	%	±%
Liberal Democratic (endorsed by Komeito)	Taku Etō (incumbent)	98,170	69.74	
Communist	Manji Kuroki	29,831	21.19	
Happiness Realization	Ichiro Kōno	12,757	9.06	N/A
Majority		68,339	48.55	
Registered electors		284,933		
Turnout			51.69	▼0.34
LDP hold				

2014
Party	Candidate	Votes	%	±%
Liberal Democratic (endorsed by Komeito)	Taku Etō (incumbent)	111,850	78.39	
Communist	Takayuki Yoshida	30,841	21.61	
Majority		81,009	56.78	
Registered electors		286,325		
Turnout			52.03	
LDP hold				

2012
Party	Candidate	Votes	%	±%
Liberal Democratic	Taku Etō (incumbent)	113,432	68.31	
Democratic	Seiichiro Dōkyū (PR seat incumbent)	41,070	24.73	
Communist	Takayuki Yoshida	11,545	6.95	N/A
Majority		72,362	43.58	
Turnout				
LDP hold				

2009
Party	Candidate	Votes	%	±%
Liberal Democratic	Taku Etō (incumbent)	120,567	56.89	
Democratic	Seiichiro Dōkyū (won PR seat)	81,997	38.69	
Independent	Morito Ohara	7,609	3.59	New
Happiness Realization	Yoshikazu Shimasaki	1,770	0.84	New
Majority		38,570	18.20	
Turnout				
LDP hold				

2005
Party	Candidate	Votes	%	±%
Independent	Taku Etō (incumbent)	101,809	47.23	
Liberal Democratic	Mitsuhiro Uesugi	61,979	28.75	N/A
Democratic	Kenji Kuroki	51,764	24.01	
Majority		39,830	18.48	
Turnout				
Independent hold				

2003
Party	Candidate	Votes	%	±%
Independent	Taku Etō	88,540	43.63	New
Independent	Kenji Kuroki	79,119	38.98	New
Democratic	Yūko Doi	29,585	14.58	
Communist	Sadao Uchiyama	5,708	2.81	
Majority		9,421	4.65	
Turnout				
Independent gain from LDP				

2000
Party	Candidate	Votes	%	±%
Liberal Democratic	Takami Eto (incumbent)	131,725	66.55	
Democratic	Emiko Nagahama	47,833	24.17	New
Communist	Mitsuru Shiotsuki	12,829	6.48	
Liberal League	Yutaka Kowata	5,533	2.80	
Majority		83,892	42.38	
Turnout				
LDP hold				

1996
Party	Candidate	Votes	%	±%
Liberal Democratic	Takami Eto	106,858	55.48	New
New Frontier	Toshimichi Tanigawa	73,553	38.19	New
Communist	Akio Noda	10,813	5.61	New
Liberal League	Takuji Aozato	1,370	0.71	New
Majority		33,305	17.29	
Turnout				
LDP win (new seat)				
