= Japan National Route 325 =

Road in Japan

National Route 325
- 国道325号

Route information
- Length: 138.5 km (86.1 mi)

Location
- Country: Japan

Highway system
- National highways of Japan; Expressways of Japan
← National Route 324	→ National Route 326

National Route 325 is a national highway of Japan connecting Kurume, Fukuoka, and Takachiho, Miyazaki, in Japan, with a total length of 138.5 km (86.06 mi).

== History ==
During the 2016 Kumamoto earthquakes, the Great Aso Bridge along National Route 325 was destroyed by a landslide that was triggered by the main shock on 16 April. A college student from Aso perished in the bridge collapse.

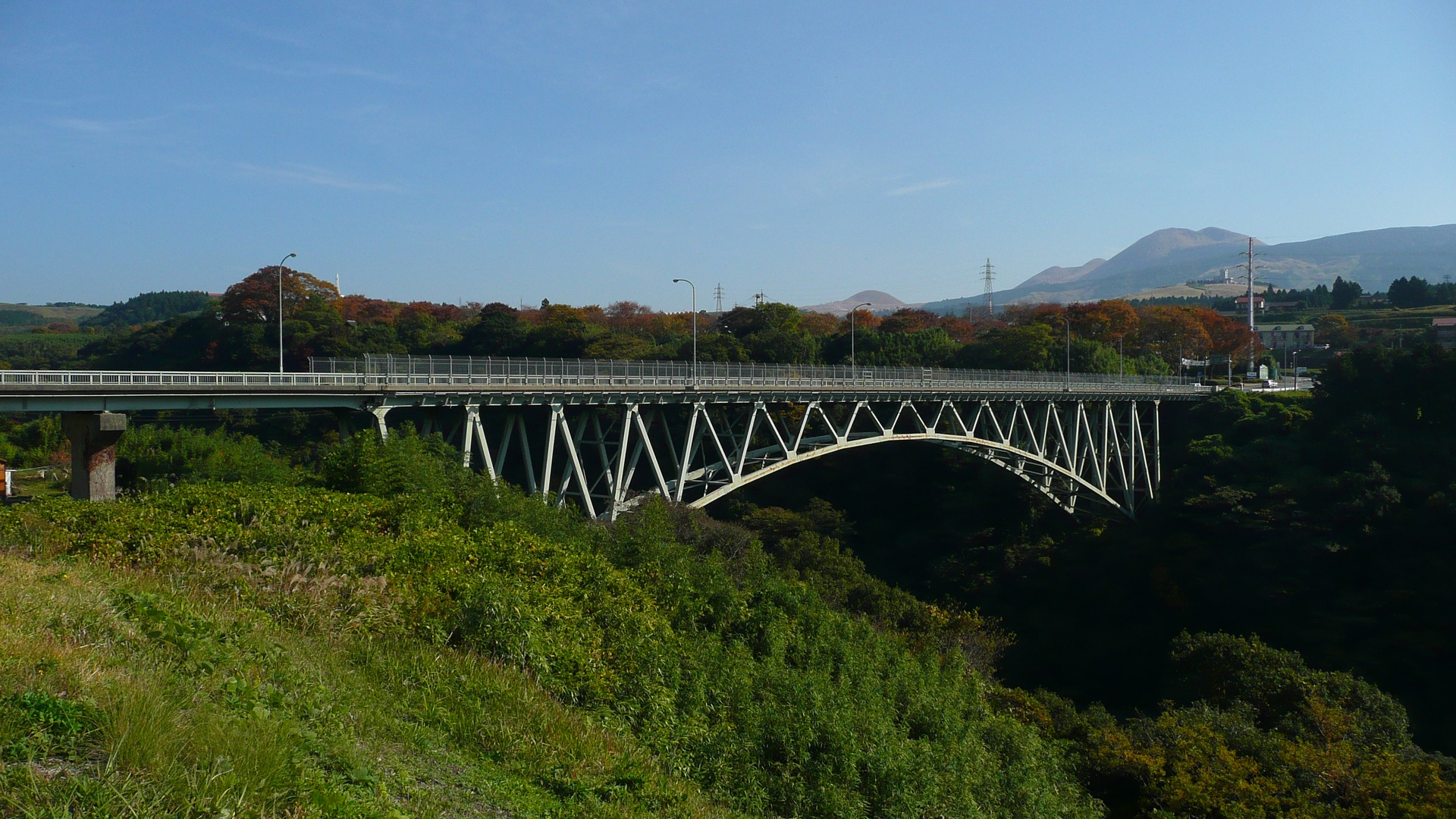
The former Aso Bridge, also known as ‘Red Bridge’, Minamiaso, Kumamoto

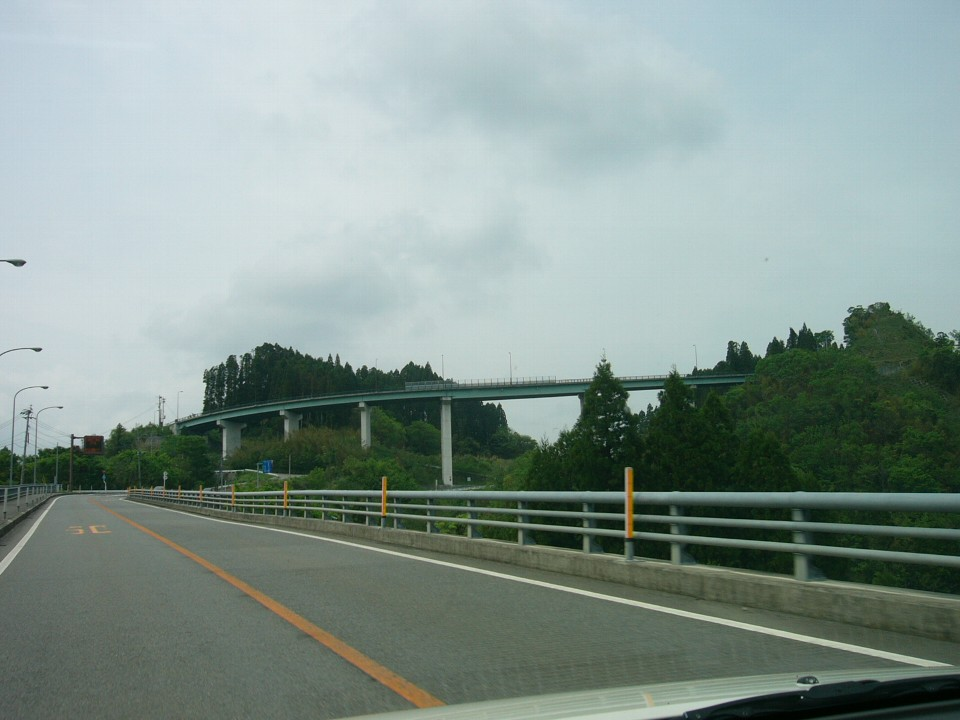
Neisei loop bridge, on the border of Kumamoto and Miyazaki prefectures.
