= Elegiac and Other Poems =

1957 poetry collection by Leonard Mann

- Author: Leonard Mann
- Language: English
- Genre: Poetry collection
- Publisher: Cheshire
- Publication date: 1957
- Publication place: Australia
- Media type: Print
- Pages: 66 pp.
- Awards: 1957 Grace Leven Prize for Poetry, winner

Elegiac and Other Poems is a poetry collection by Australian poet Leonard Mann, published by Cheshire in Australia in 1957.

The collection contains 32 poems from a variety of sources, with some being published here for the first time.

The collection won the 1957 Grace Leven Prize for Poetry.

== Contents ==
- "Elegy for Furnley Maurice"
- "Cootamundra Wattle"
- "The Soldier and the Bird"
- "Self-Portrait of Rembrandt in the Melbourne Art Gallery"
- "The Wanderers"
- "Death on the Job"
- "To My Wife Concering Her Garden"
- "All This Shall Pass Away"
- "The Slain Child"
- "The Eagle"
- "The Goldensinger"
- "Spring Morning"
- "The Drought's Broken"
- "The Storm"
- "Lost Youth"
- "Alighierian"
- "The Criminals"
- "The Fan-Dancer's Conversion"
- "Moonlight"
- "On Guard"
- "The Snake"
- "Ngarla"
- "Leda at the Dam"
- "All Creatures"
- "Sun and Earth"
- "The God"
- "To Apollo for Asklepios"
- "The Imitators"
- "Cassandra"
- "Apollo and Christ"
- "The Indian Picture"
- "To God"

== Critical reception ==
Ian Mair, writing in The Age, commented that as Mann felt "no great affinity with his senior or juniors, he has therefore to get a style of his own." Mair indicated a number of poems in the collection for special mention, concluding that in "each of these there is somewhere, suddenly, the line, the word that sheds a great light."

Reviewing the collection for The Bulletin a reviewer noted that Mann is "experimenting with a nubbly, stubbly Anglo-Saxon kind of verse which might have its origin in the Norse Edda, in the Oxford carols, in Skelton, in Donne or in the modem revival of such techniques begun by Gerard Manley Hopkins and carried on by Auden and his followers." While that ambition was considered lauable they also found that "it cannot be said, full of strength though his best effects are, that Mann always handles these perilous devices like an expert."

== Awards ==
- 1957 Grace Leven Prize for Poetry, winner

== See also ==
- 1957 in Australian literature
