= Saishū Onoe =

Japanese tanka poet, educator, and calligrapher

- 尾上 柴舟
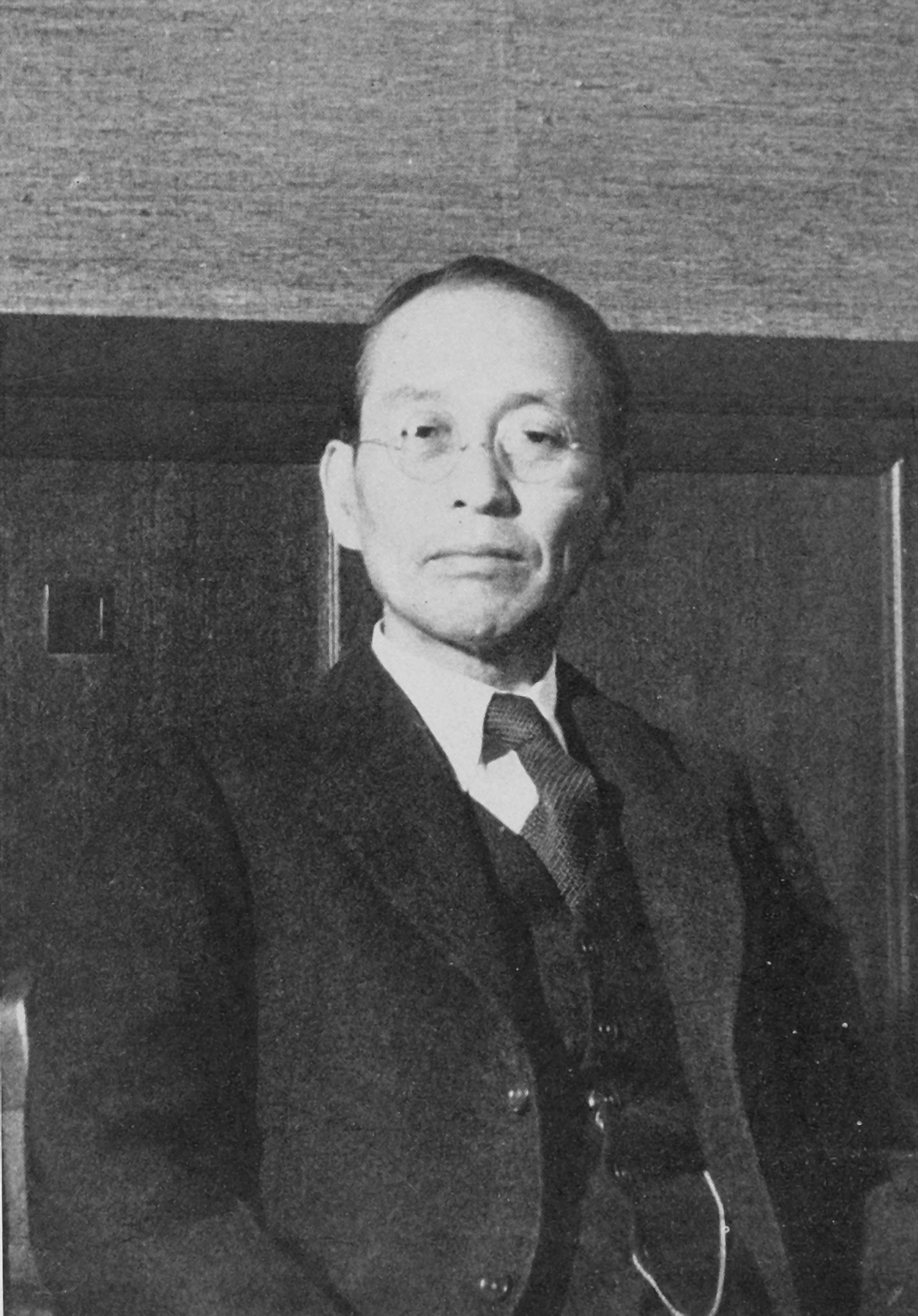
- Saishū Onoe in 1935
- Born: Hachirō Onoe; August 20, 1876; Okayama, Japan
- Died: January 13, 1957 (aged 80); Tokyo, Japan
- Education: University of Tokyo
- Occupations: Tanka poet, calligrapher
- Writing career
- Genre: Tanka poetry
- Literary movement: Lyric poetry

Japanese name
- Kanji: 尾上 柴舟
- Hiragana: おのえ さいしゅう

Saishū Onoe (尾上 柴舟, Onoe Saishū) (20 August 1876 – 1, January, 1957) was the pen name of Hachirō Onoe (尾上 八郎, Onoe Hachirō), a Japanese tanka poet, educator, and calligrapher.

== Biography ==
After finishing Tokyo Imperial University in 1901, after teaching at Tetsugaku-kan, Onoe professed at the early days of Ochanomizu Women's College (then Tokyo Women's Higher Normal School (東京女子高等師範学校), and Waseda University at its Department of Education (then Waseda University Higher Normal School (早稲田大学高等師範部), (Note: The Official Gazette records in 1918 (Taisho 7th) that Onoe was transferred.) to be a professor at Gakushuin Women's University(then Gakushuin for Girls (女子学習院). Onoe also taught at the 6th Temporary Teacher Vocational School.

Saishū wrote a poetry column for the magazine Shinsei ("New Voices"). He also founded the Shazensō-sha ("Plantain Society") in 1905, which stressed clarity, simplicity, and capturing ordinary experiences in poetry. This was in reaction to the style of the tanka poets associated with Myōjō magazine (such as Yosano Akiko) which emphasized the passionate side of human nature. Members of the Shazensō-sha included the noted Naturalist tanka poets Wakayama Bokusui and Maeda Yūgure, a pupil of Onoe Saishū.

=== Exhibitions ===
Post humous exhibition was held in Ginza in 1957. It was followed by the anniversary exhibitions at the 100th and 130th year after Onoe's birth, or in 1975 and in 2006 respectively with catalogs published.

- Gallery, Matsuya department: Retrospective show. September 27–2 October 1957.
- Tokyo Central Art Museum: Onoe Saisho exhibition, commemorating the 25th anniversary of the Society. Organized by the Nihon Shodō Kyōiku Gakkai Society, September 16–21, 1975. (Catalog NCID BN07084332、CRID: 1130282271573681536.)
- Naritasan Temple Calligraphy Museum: Onoe Saisho exhibition, the 130th year after the artist's birth. 29 October - 23 December 2005. (Catalog NCID BC1652231X、CRID: 1130011838007309218.)

== Private collection ==
Onoe was a collector of historical calligraphic works, including:

- Kegonkyō: The Treasures of Mr. Saisho Onoe. Taito Shodoin Dairibu (publisher), Kōmyōsha (distributor), 1938, CRID: 1130282272198678528. Orihon folded book, Japanese binding.
- Asano, Gyoyō (1940). Remnants of the Ancient Buddhist Sutra: A Treasure of Mr. Saisho Onoe. Taito Shodoin Dairibu, CRID: 1130282270385880960 . Orihon folded book, Japanese binding.

== Honor ==
Received the Second Order of the Sacred Treasure on April 23, 1939 (Shōwa 14).

== Publications ==
=== Calligraphy ===
- Onoe Sasishu. Onoe Saishu Toyonotoshi. Japan Calligraphy Education Society, 1965, CiNii.

==== Textbooks ====
Hachiro Onoe (1955–1956). Calligraphy Introductory Course, Iwasaki Shoten, an anthology.

Co-edited:

- Hachiro Onoe, Morohashi, Tetsuji. (1930). History of Japanese Calligraphy, Yuzankaku, NCID BN16078771.
- History of Japanese Calligraphy (1934). Heibonsha, CiNii.
- Japanese Calligraphy and Japanese Spirit (1940). Cabinet Printing Bureau, CiNii. Education Bureau, CiNii.
  - Japanese calligraphy and Japanese spirit (1940). Japan Cultural Association, CiNii.
- Ishibashi, Keijuro (1950). Advanced Calligraphy Tokyo Shubunkan.[31] .
  - Ishibashi, Keijuro (1952). Advanced Calligraphy: A Teachers' Material. CiNii.
- Ishibashi, Keijuro (1953). New Advanced Calligraphy. Tokyo Shubunkan, CiNii. Revised in 1955, CiNii.
  - Ishibashi, Keijuro (1953). New Advanced Calligraphy: A Teachers' Material. Shubunkan, 1953, CiNii.
- Ishibashi, Keijuro (1955). Illustrated Calligraphy Education. Iwasaki Shoten. CiNii. Revised in 1966, CiNii.
- Ishibashi, Keijuro (1957). New Mirrors for Calligraphy. Shubunkan, CiNii. Revised in 1958, CiNii.

=== Literature ===
==== Translated works ====
- Heine, Heinrich. Heine's Poetry. Shinseisha, 1901.
- 天花才子, ed. (1944–1948). 快心編 [Kaishin-hen] (in Japanese). Translated by Onoe Saishū. Yuzankaku. volume 1 and volume 2, with volume 3 (1948).
- 尾上, 柴舟, 1876-1957 (1948). 後西遊記 [After the Journey to the West] (in Japanese). Translated by Onoe, Saishu. Hori shoten [堀書店]. doi:10.11501/1136060.

== Exhibition catalogs ==
- Onoe, Saishu (1957). Calligraphy of the late Onoe Saishu (尾上柴舟遺墨展). Sendansha. NCID BB01563269.
- Onoe, Saishu. (1975). Onoe Shishu Birth Centenary Exhibition, Japan Calligraphy Education Society (ed), CRID: 1130282271573681536.
- Naritasan Temple Calligraphy Museum (2005). Onoe Saishu: 130 Years after Birth. Naritasan Temple Calligraphy Museum, CRID: 1130011838007309218.
- Shishu Onoe, Japan Calligraphy Museum (2006). Special Exhibition: Saishu Onoe: 130th Anniversary of Birth: People and Their Works. Educational Calligraphy Publishing Association, CRID: 1130282272228253184.
