= Togo, Miyazaki =

Dissolved municipality in Miyazaki prefecture, Japan

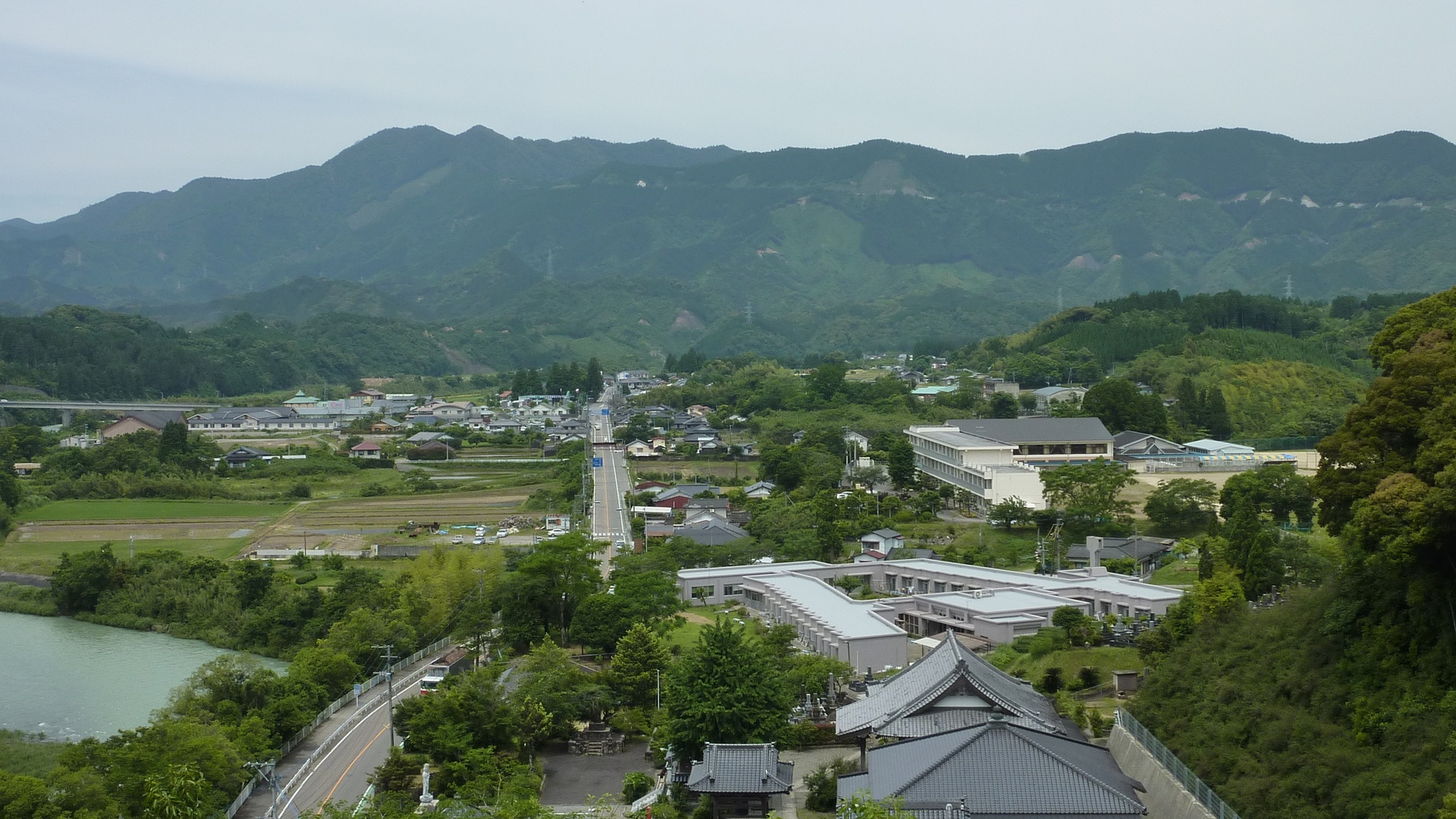
The Yamage district of Tōgō near the roadside station.

Tōgō (東郷町, Tōgō-chō), literally translating to "east shire," was a town located in Higashiusuki District, Miyazaki Prefecture, Japan.

The town had an estimated population of 5,025 in 2003, with a density of 22.97 persons per km^{2}. The total area was 218.73 km^{2}.

On February 25, 2006, Tōgō was merged into the city of Hyūga, and no longer exists as an independent municipality.

The town was an eastern quarter of the so-called Irigo (literally Inlands Shire) area.

== History ==
The town was established in 1889 by merging the villages (now hamlets) of Shimosanga, Yamage, Tsuboya and Yaebaru-Sakonouchi; which later was elevated to town status in 1969.
