= Enid Moodie Heddle =

Australian poet and writer (March 10, 1904 –December 11, 1991)

- Born: Enid Olive Mary Moodie Heddle; 10 March 1904; Elsternwick, Victoria
- Died: 11 December 1991 (aged 87); Glen Iris, Victoria
- Occupations: writer and poet
- Writing career
- Language: English
- Years active: 1937-1970
- Notable work: The Boomerang Book of Legendary Tales
- Notable awards: Children's Book of the Year Award: Older Readers 1957

Enid Moodie Heddle (March 10, 1904 – December 11, 1991) was an Australian poet, writer, editor and publisher for children who was born in Elsternwick, Victoria.

She attended Sydney Girls' High School, and graduated from the University of Melbourne with an MA. She then taught at schools in South Australia and Victoria, while also spending some time in England teaching and researching children's libraries.

In 1935 she joined the Longman publishing house and worked as an educational adviser to Longmans and Collins from 1935–1946. After the Second World War she was appointed as Education Manager, 1945-1960) and in that capacity oversaw the publication of textbooks for schools and universities.

Heddle published two collections of poetry and edited a number of books, with The Boomerang Book of Legendary Tales winning the Children's Book of the Year Award: Older Readers in 1957.

She published articles in Meanjin (1943, 1947, 1959) and Walkabout. She also edited the Australian editions of The Poet's Way (1942-1994), Discovering Poetry (1956-1957) and A Galaxy of Poems Old and New (1962).

She died in Glen Iris, Victoria in 1991.

== Bibliography ==
=== Poetry collections ===
- Solitude and Other Vagaries (1937)
- Sagita Says (1943)

=== Non-fiction ===
- Story of a Vineyard - Chateau Tahbilk (1968)

=== Edited ===
- Some Australian Adventurers (Longman, Greens and Co., 1944) short story anthology
- Action and Adventure : A Book of Australian Prose (1954) short story anthology
- The Boomerang Book of Australian Poetry (1956) poetry anthology for children
- The Boomerang Book of Legendary Tales (1957) fiction anthology for children
- A Galaxy of Poems, Old and New (1962) edited with E. W. Parker, poetry anthology
- More Australian Adventurers (1970) short story anthology
