= Kehos Kliger =

Polish-Argentine Yiddish poet (1904–1985)

Kehos Kliger (July 4, 1904 – April 20, 1985) was a Yiddish poet.

== Biography ==
He was born in Ludmir, Russian Empire (now Volodymyr, Ukraine). His father was a composer and cantor. He studied in cheder and yeshiva, and later Polish schools. He moved to Argentina in 1936 due to political persecution.

A prolific poet, Kliger's work covered different genres and verse forms. His poetry appeared regularly in Di Prese, the Yiddish daily of the Argentine Jewish diaspora. Notable works include Gezang Oif Der Erd (1941) and Die velt farbet mikh shtarben (1950). He also translated José Hernández's Argentine national epic Martín Fierro into Yiddish. He died in Buenos Aires.
