= Australian Letters =

Australian literary journal

- Categories: Literature, literary criticism, art
- Frequency: Quarterly
- First issue: 1 June 1957
- Final issue: 1 January 1968
- Country: Australia
- Language: English

Australian Letters: A Quarterly of Writing and Criticism was an Australian journal founded in 1957 by Max Harris, Geoffrey Dutton and Bryn Davies. Its final issue was published in January 1968.

The journal filled a niche between the more political Overland, Meanjin and Quadrant and the more academic Southerly and Australian Literary Studies. Based in Adelaide, the journal included works of art on its front covers. Collaborations between artists and poets featured in 19 issues.

== Editorial team ==
Journal founders Max Harris and Geoffrey Dutton edited the journal throughout its existence. The third founder, Bryn Davies, left after 1964, while Rosemary Wighton joined as editor from 1963 until its closure.
