= Last Meeting (poem) =

1957 poem by Gwen Harwood

- by Gwen Harwood
- First published in: Australian Poetry 1957 edited by Hal Porter
- Country: Australia
- Language: English
- Published in English: 1957

"Last Meeting" is a 1957 poem by Australian author Gwen Harwood.

It was first published in Australian Poetry 1957 edited by Hal Porter, and was subsequently reprinted in the author's collections and other poetry anthologies.

== Synopsis ==
The poem describes the last meeting between two lovers, one day at "the littoral zone of day and night".

== Critical reception ==
In The Guardian, Carol Rumens was taken by the poem's "emotional power". She went on: "Arousing emotion is a somewhat unfashionable poetic skill, but there's no good reason otherwise for writers to bother with the drama-heightening apparatus of lines, stanzas, metaphors. In the way Harwood pushes romanticism and realism against each other, she reminds me of the great Irish novelist, Elizabeth Bowen. Neither writer is deluded by intensity of feeling: they expose their lovers to realism's fullest rebuttal, yet the significance of intense experience to the individuals concerned is nearly always validated, and never trivialised."

== Publication history ==
After the poem's initial publication in Australian Poetry 1957 it was reprinted as follows:

- Modern Australian Verse edited by Douglas Stewart, Angus and Robertson, 1964
- Selected Poems : A New Edition by Gwen Harwood, Angus and Robertson, 2001
- Gwen Harwood : Collected Poems 1943-1995 edited by Alison Hoddinott and Gregory Kratzmann, University of Queensland Press, 2003
- Mappings of the Plane : New Selected Poems by Gwen Harwood, edited by Gregory Kratzmann and Chris Wallace-Crabbe, Fyfield Books, 2009
- The Fire of Joy : Roughly Eighty Poems to Get by Heart and Say Aloud edited by Clive James, Picador, 2020

== Notes ==
- You can read the full text of the poem in The Guardian, 1 March 2010

== See also ==
- 1957 in Australian literature
