= Leonard Mann (writer) =

Australian poet and novelist

- Born: 15 November 1895; Toorak, Victoria, Australia
- Died: 29 April 1981 (aged 85); Emerald, Victoria, Australia
- Occupations: novelist and poet
- Writing career
- Period: 1932-1969

Leonard Mann (15 November 1895 – 29 April 1981) was an Australian poet and novelist.

== Life ==
Leonard Mann was born in Prahran in Melbourne on 15 November 1895. He was the son of Samuel and Kate Louise Mann and went on to be educated at Moreland State School and Wesley College.

After the failure of his father's drapery business in 1913 he left his studies and worked as a clerk in the Public Service before joining up with the AIF during World War I. Mann served on the Western Front before being repatriated back to Britain in 1919 and then returning to Australia.

Back in Victoria he resumed his studies at the University of Melbourne, completing a Law degree before marrying Florence Eileen Archer in January 1926.

He enrolled in the Victorian Bar and began writing poetry and fiction, which resulted in the publication of his first novel, Flesh in Armour, in 1932. This subsequently won Mann the Australian Literature Society's Gold Medal.

During World War II he worked with the Aircraft Production Commission, following which he returned to the Public Service.

He continued to write throughout his working life, producing seven novels and four collections of poetry.

Leonard Man died at Emerald, Victoria on 29 April 1981.

== Awards ==
- 1957 Grace Leven Prize for Poetry for Elegiac and Other Poems
- 1932 ALS Gold Medal for his first novel, Flesh in Armour

== Works ==
=== Poetry ===
- Elegiac and Other Poems. Cheshire. 1957.
- The Delectable Mountains and Other Poems. Angus and Robertson. 1944.
- Poems From the Mask. Hawthorn Press. 1941.
- The Plumed Voice: Poems. Angus & Robertson. 1938.

=== Novels ===
- Flesh in Armour (1932)
- Human Drift. Angus and Robertson. 1935.
- A Murder in Sydney. Jonathan Cape. 1937.
- Mountain Flat. Jonathan Cape. 1939.
- The Go-Getter. Angus and Robertson. 1942.
- Andrea Caslin. Jonathan Cape. 1959.
- Venus Half-Caste. Hodder and Stoughton. 1963.

=== Recordings ===
- Leonard Mann; Hazel de Berg (interviewer). Leonard Mann Interview. National Library of Australia.

=== Anthologies ===
- Jennifer Strauss, ed. (1993). The Oxford Book of Australian Love Poems. Oxford University Press. ISBN 978-0-19-553297-5.
