= Hyūga, Miyazaki =

Hyūga 日向市
- City
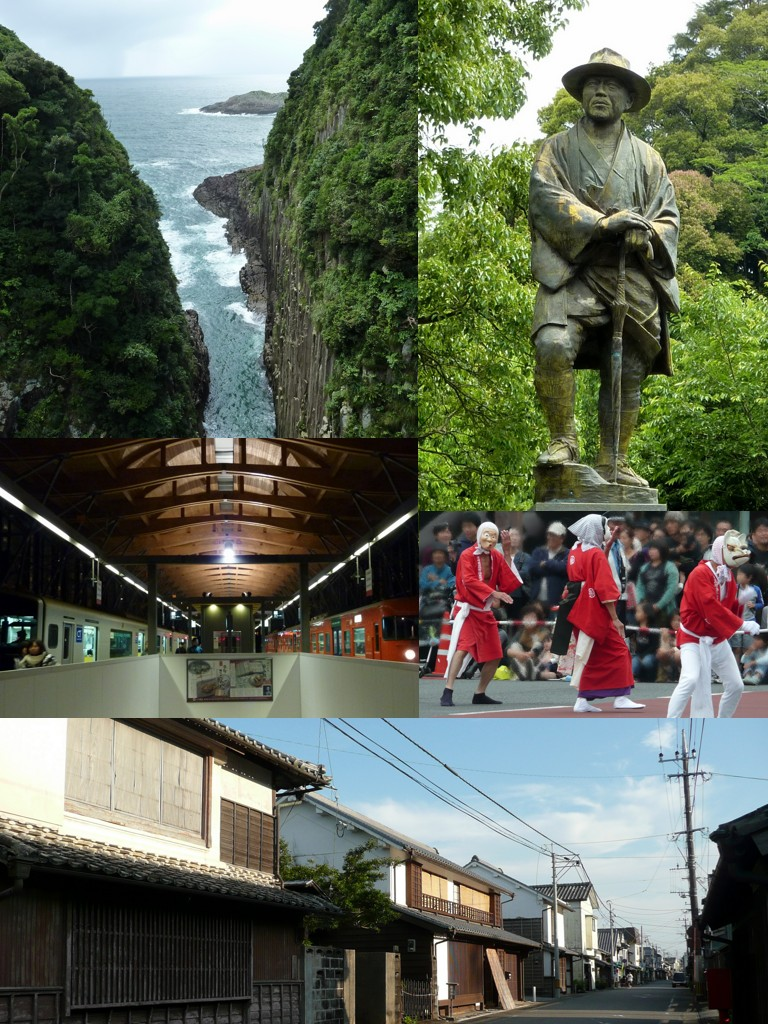
- Top left: Umagase in Nippo Coast Quasi National Park. Top right: Statue of Bokusui Wakayama in Tōgō. Middle left: View of platform at Hyugashi Station. Middle right: Hyottoko dancing event in August. Bottom: Old Traditional Town in Mimitsu.

- Flag Emblem
- Interactive map of Hyūga
- Location in Japan
- Coordinates: 32°25′22″N 131°37′26″E
- Country: Japan
- Region: Kyushu
- Prefecture: Miyazaki

Government
  - Mayor: Kōhei Toya

Area
  - Total: 336.94 km^{2} (130.09 sq mi)

Population (October 1, 2023)
  - Total: 57,746
  - Density: 171.38/km^{2} (443.88/sq mi)
- Time zone: UTC+09:00 (JST)
- City hall address: 10-5 Honmachi, Hyūga-shi, Miyazaki-ken 883-8555
- Climate: Cfa
- Website: Official website
- Symbols
- Flower: Sunflower
- Tree: Osmanthus

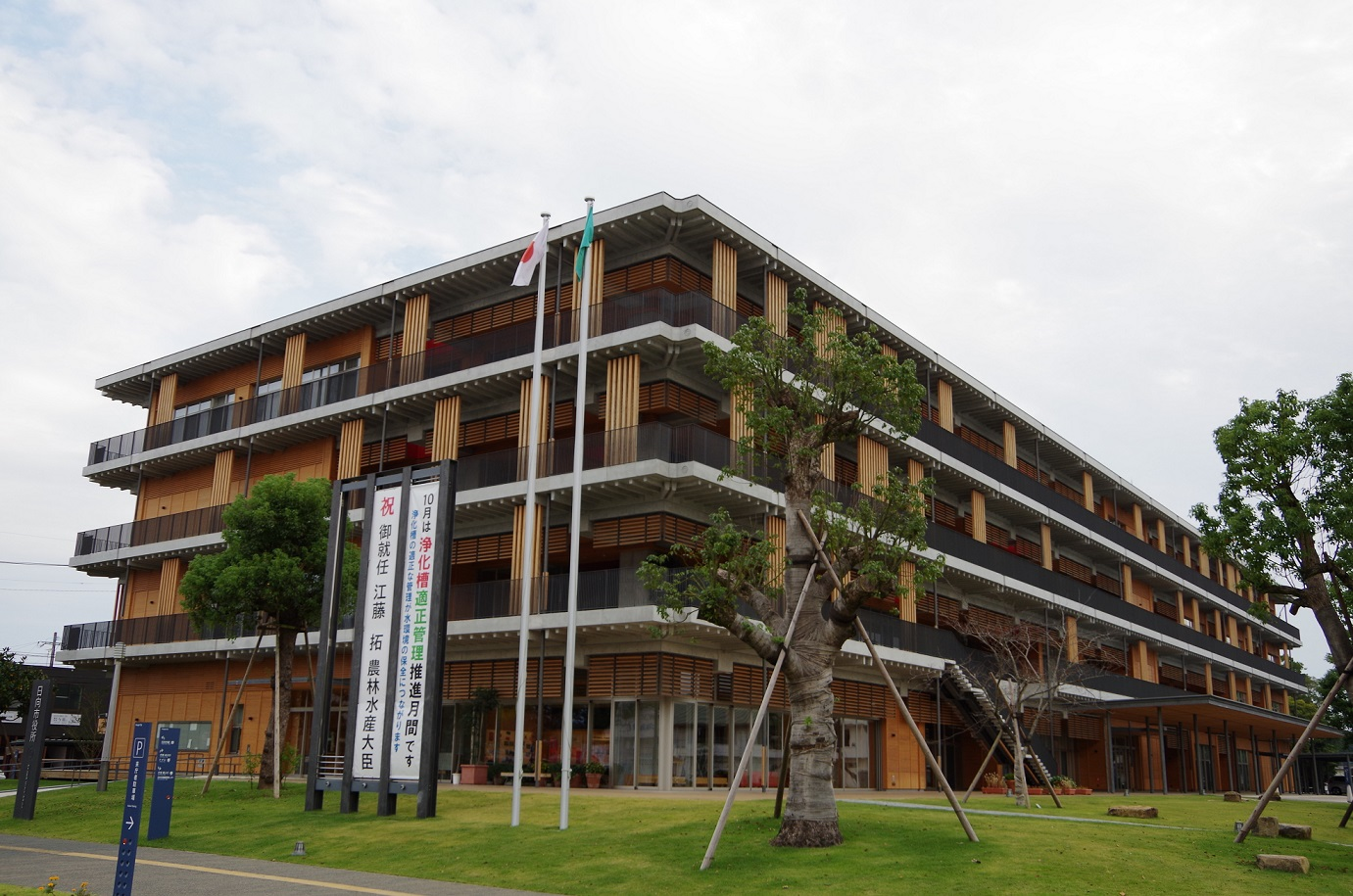
Hyūga city hall

Hyūga (日向市, Hyūga-shi; Japanese pronunciation: [çj̊ɨ́ɨ̀.ɡä̀, -ŋä̀, çj̊ɨ̀ɨ́.ɡä́.ɕì, -ŋä́-]) is a city in Miyazaki Prefecture, Japan. As of 1 October 2023, the city had an estimated population of 57,746, and a population density of 170 persons per km²., making it the 4th largest city in Miyazaki Prefecture in terms of population. The total area of the city is 336.94 km^{2} (130.09 sq mi). Hyūga is a port city known for the production of Go stones and for beaches, many of which are popular surfing spots.

== Origin of name ==
Hyuga City took its name from Hyūga Province (日向国, Hyūga/Hinata no kuni), the historical name of what is now Miyazaki Prefecture. According to Japanese legend in the Nihon Shoki, following the conquest of the Kumaso people, Emperor Keikō watched the sunrise over the ocean and said "This country faces straight toward the sunrise" (この国は真っ直ぐに日の出る方に向いている, Kono kuni wa massugu ni hinoderu hou ni muite iru). From that time, the province was known as Hyuga or Hinata (the country facing the sun) until the Meiji Restoration when it was renamed Miyazaki.

== Geography ==
Hyūga is located in central Miyazaki Prefecture. It is bordered by the Hyūga Sea to the east and the Kyushu Mountains to the west. The area along Cape Hyūga with its exposed hexagonal pillar rocks and ria (saw tooth) coastline are designated as part of the Nippō Kaigan Quasi-National Park. A bit south are beaches such as Ise-ga-hama, Okura-ga-hama, and Kane-ga-hama, known for their surfing.

=== Neighboring municipalities ===
Miyazaki Prefecture

- Kadogawa to the north
- Kijō to the southwest
- Misato to the west
- Tsuno to the south

=== Climate ===
Hyūga is located in the humid subtropical climate zone (Köppen climate classification: Cfa), exhibiting four distinct seasons. It has a mild, but humid subtropical climate with no dry season. The climate is comparable to the southern coastal areas of the United States or southern Europe. The average summer daytime temperature is about 30 °C (86 °F) with 80% humidity. The average winter daytime temperature is about 13 °C (56 °F) with 60% humidity. Early summer is marked with the rainy season in June and July. This is followed by a hot, humid summer and daily sunshine, but is often accompanied by typhoons. Winter is mild with small amounts of rain.

Climate data for Hyūga (1991−2020 normals, extremes 1977−present)
Month	Jan	Feb	Mar	Apr	May	Jun	Jul	Aug	Sep	Oct	Nov	Dec	Year
Record high °C (°F)	23.4 (74.1)	25.2 (77.4)	29.6 (85.3)	30.1 (86.2)	32.9 (91.2)	35.9 (96.6)	38.5 (101.3)	38.9 (102.0)	35.7 (96.3)	33.4 (92.1)	29.6 (85.3)	26.5 (79.7)	38.9 (102.0)
Mean daily maximum °C (°F)	13.0 (55.4)	14.0 (57.2)	17.0 (62.6)	21.4 (70.5)	24.8 (76.6)	26.7 (80.1)	30.9 (87.6)	31.8 (89.2)	29.1 (84.4)	24.8 (76.6)	19.9 (67.8)	14.8 (58.6)	22.4 (72.2)
Daily mean °C (°F)	6.8 (44.2)	7.9 (46.2)	11.1 (52.0)	15.6 (60.1)	19.6 (67.3)	22.5 (72.5)	26.3 (79.3)	27.0 (80.6)	24.2 (75.6)	19.2 (66.6)	13.9 (57.0)	8.7 (47.7)	16.9 (62.4)
Mean daily minimum °C (°F)	1.8 (35.2)	2.7 (36.9)	5.8 (42.4)	10.5 (50.9)	15.1 (59.2)	19.2 (66.6)	22.9 (73.2)	23.7 (74.7)	20.7 (69.3)	15.0 (59.0)	9.4 (48.9)	3.8 (38.8)	12.6 (54.6)
Record low °C (°F)	−6.0 (21.2)	−7.1 (19.2)	−3.3 (26.1)	0.5 (32.9)	6.5 (43.7)	10.8 (51.4)	15.4 (59.7)	16.0 (60.8)	9.4 (48.9)	4.2 (39.6)	−0.9 (30.4)	−5.5 (22.1)	−7.1 (19.2)
Average precipitation mm (inches)	68.0 (2.68)	96.1 (3.78)	156.9 (6.18)	205.3 (8.08)	270.0 (10.63)	474.3 (18.67)	281.5 (11.08)	272.7 (10.74)	391.7 (15.42)	226.7 (8.93)	114.0 (4.49)	74.4 (2.93)	2,633.3 (103.67)
Average precipitation days (≥ 1.0 mm)	5.5	7.2	9.9	10.0	10.8	15.5	11.7	12.6	12.6	8.5	7.2	5.3	116.8
Mean monthly sunshine hours	196.8	181.1	186.5	193.8	183.9	121.7	193.8	203.2	159.0	177.9	173.1	188.2	2,162.4
Source: Japan Meteorological Agency

=== Demographics ===
As of November 2015, Hyūga had a total population of 63,011 people; 30,150 males and 32,861 females.

Population of Hyūga

Year	Pop.	±% p.a.
1991	58,190	—
1992	58,208	+0.03%
1993	58,309	+0.17%
1994	58,530	+0.38%
1995	58,802	+0.46%
1996	58,906	+0.18%
1997	59,025	+0.20%
1998	59,026	+0.00%
1999	58,991	−0.06%

Year	Pop.	±% p.a.
2000	58,996	+0.01%
2001	59,056	+0.10%
2002	59,187	+0.22%
2003	59,156	−0.05%
2004	59,112	−0.07%
2005	58,648	−0.78%
2006	63,272	+7.88%
2007	63,011	−0.41%
2008	62,776	−0.37%

Year	Pop.	±% p.a.
2009	62,874	+0.16%
2010	62,804	−0.11%
2011	62,619	−0.29%
2012	62,648	+0.05%
2013	62,225	−0.68%
2014	61,879	−0.56%
2015	63,011	+1.83%

In 2006, Togo was merged into the city, adding about 1,750 people to the population. This accounts for part of the increase in that year.

=== Districts ===
- Shinmachi (新町地区, Shinmachi-chiku)

Shinmachi (新町) is Hyūga's downtown area. Hyūga City has been engaged in large scale urban renewal, slowly widening roads, creating new businesses, beautifying, and modernizing the city center. As such, Shinmachi is relatively new and modern. This region is centered on Hyūgashi Station.

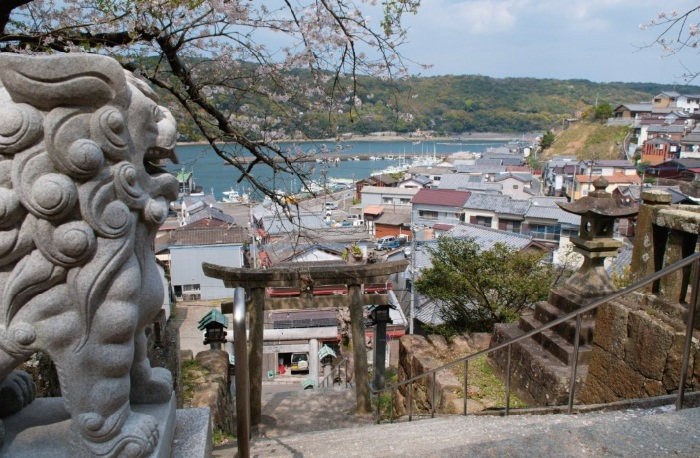
Hososhima Port

- Hososhima (細島地区, Hososhima-chiku)

The southern part of Hososhima is centered on Hyūga's commercial fishing port between Komenoyama and Makishimayama. This is an older less frequented part of Hyūga. The streets are narrow and there are numerous old Edo-period buildings.

The northern part of Hososhima is far more industrial. This region has several manufacturing plants and large areas for storage of goods and raw materials. Hososhima Industrial Port currently serves as the main international port in northern Miyazaki Prefecture handling materials and goods import and export in the region. Hososhima Industrial Port is designated as a Special Major Port and was selected as a focus port by the Japanese government in 2010. There continues to be major development and expansion of the port and its available services. Hososhima Port was selected by the Japanese government as Port of the Year 2015.

- Mimitsu area (美々津地区, Mimitsu-chiku)

Mimitsu was a port town to the south of Hyūga which merged in 1955. It is famous for washi paper and fishing. It is also supposedly the port from which the first Japanese Emperor, Jimmu, launched his military expedition to conquer Yamato and establish it as the center of power.

In the 19th century, it was a prosperous commercial port that was a hub for trade with the cities of Kyoto, Osaka, and Kobe, with so many houses belonging to merchants and shipping agents crowded together that people used to refer to the thousand houses of Mimitsu (Mimitsu-sengen). It fell into sharp decline with the advent of railroads. In 1986, it was designated as a national important preservation district for groups of historic buildings, and much of the 19th-century atmosphere, including traditional buildings, earthen walls, and stone pavements, remains.

- Togo (東郷地区, Togo-chiku)

Tōgō was a small mountain town which merged with Hyūga on February 25, 2006. Togo was the home town of the Japanese writer Bokusui Wakayama.

== History ==
Archaeologists working in Hyūga have reported finding artifacts such as stone tools and stone piles from as much as 30,000 years ago, the Japanese Paleolithic period. There is also evidence of inhabitation during the Jōmon period. Archaeological digs uncovering pottery from this time period continue today in parts of the city.

During the Edo period, Hyūga was divided between the holdings of Nobeoka Domain and tenryō territory administered directly by the Tokugawa shogunate. Following the Meiji Restoration, the town of Hososhima and villages of Iwawaki ad Tomidaka were established on May 1, 1889 with the creation of the modern municipalities system. Tomidaka was raised to town status on October 1, 1921. On October 1, 1937, Hososhima and Tomidaka merged to form Toshima Town. Toshima merged with Iwawaki to form the city of Hyūga on April 1, 1951.

=== Municipal consolidation ===
Modern Hyūga City is a result of the merger of numerous smaller towns and villages. These mergers began at the start of the Meiji Period when the han system was abolished and the concept of towns and cities arose. This time period, between 1888 and 1889, became known as the Great Meiji Consolidation. Following this, towns continued to merge mainly due to population limitations or financial limitations. The most recent merger in 2006 with Tōgō (from Higashiusuki District) was part of the Great Heisei Consolidation. This was a government initiative to counter population declines and financial problems while promoting decentralization of the national government. This merger increased Hyuga City's population, tax money, and autonomy.

Hyuga City Mergers
Before April 1, 1889	April 1, 1889	1898	1921	1937	April 1, 1951	1955	1969	February 25, 2006
Hichiya Village 日知屋村	Tomitaka Village 富高村		Tomitaka Town 富高町	Tomishima Town 富島町	Hyuga City 日向市	Hyuga City 日向市		Hyuga City 日向市
Shiomi Village 塩見村	Tomitaka Village 富高村		Tomitaka Town 富高町	Tomishima Town 富島町	Hyuga City 日向市	Hyuga City 日向市		Hyuga City 日向市
Zaikoji Village 財光寺村	Tomitaka Village 富高村		Tomitaka Town 富高町	Tomishima Town 富島町	Hyuga City 日向市	Hyuga City 日向市		Hyuga City 日向市
Tomitaka Village 富高村	Tomitaka Village 富高村		Tomitaka Town 富高町	Tomishima Town 富島町	Hyuga City 日向市	Hyuga City 日向市		Hyuga City 日向市
Hososhima Town 細島町				Tomishima Town 富島町	Hyuga City 日向市	Hyuga City 日向市		Hyuga City 日向市
Hiraiwa Village 平岩村	Iwawaki Village 岩脇村				Hyuga City 日向市	Hyuga City 日向市		Hyuga City 日向市
Saiwaki Village 幸脇村	Iwawaki Village 岩脇村				Hyuga City 日向市	Hyuga City 日向市		Hyuga City 日向市
Mimitsu Town 美々津町	Mimitsu Village 美々津村	Mimitsu Town 美々津町				Hyuga City 日向市		Hyuga City 日向市
Takamatsu Village 高松村	Mimitsu Village 美々津村	Mimitsu Town 美々津町				Hyuga City 日向市		Hyuga City 日向市
Yamage Village 山陰村	Togo Village 東郷村						Togo Town 東郷町	Hyuga City 日向市
Haebaru-Sakanouchi Village 八重原・迫野内村	Togo Village 東郷村						Togo Town 東郷町	Hyuga City 日向市
Tsuboya Village 坪谷村	Togo Village 東郷村						Togo Town 東郷町	Hyuga City 日向市
Shimosange Village 下三ケ村	Togo Village 東郷村						Togo Town 東郷町	Hyuga City 日向市
source: Current Status and Problems of Hyuga City (2008)

== Government ==
Hyūga has a mayor-council form of government with a directly elected mayor and a unicameral city council of 20 members. Hyūga contributes two members to the Miyazaki Prefectural Assembly. In terms of national politics, the city is part of the Miyazaki 2nd district of the lower house of the Diet of Japan.

== Economy ==
Hyūga is a major industrial center, with many chemical plants belonging to the Asahi Kasei group. Other major industries include smelting, titanium production and food processing.

== Education ==
Hyūga has 13 elementary schools, seven junior high schools and three high schools. The Miyazaki Board of Education also operates one special education school for the handicapped.

=== High schools ===
- Hyūga High School
- Tomishima High School
- Hyūga Industrial High School

=== Junior high schools ===
- Iwawaki Junior High School
- Zaikōji Junior High School
- Daiodani Academy – Junior High School
- Hyūga Junior High School
- Mimitsu Junior High School
- Tomishima Junior High School
- Tōgō Junior High School

=== Elementary schools ===
- Shiomi Elementary School
- Saiwaki Elementary School
- Hososhima Elementary School
- Zaikōji Elementary School
- Zaikōji Minami Elementary School
- Daiodani Academy - Elementary School
- Hichiya Elementary School
- Hichiya Higashi Elementary School
- Mimitsu Elementary School
- Tomitaka Elementary School
- Hiraiwa Elementary School
- Tōgō Elementary School
- Tsuboya Elementary School

== Transportation ==
=== Railways ===
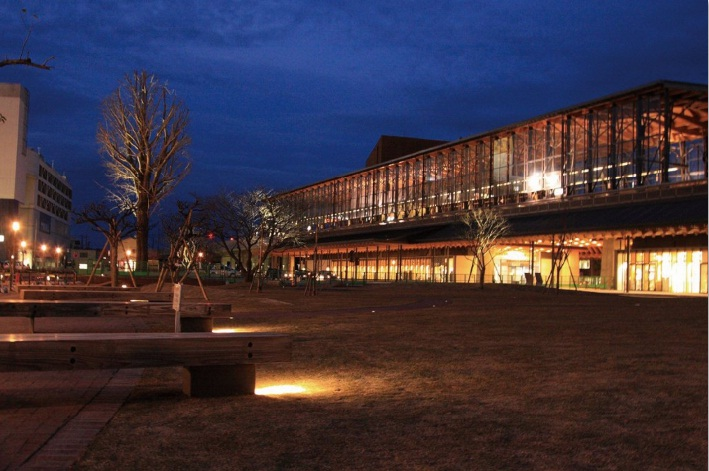
Hyūgashi Station

JR Kyushu - Nippō Main Line

- Hyūgashi - Zaikōji - Minami-Hyūga - Mimitsu

=== Highways ===
- Higashikyushu Expressway
- National Route 10
- National Route 327
- National Route 446
- National Route 503

== Sister cities ==
- Weifang, Shandong, China, friendship city since February 25, 1986

== Local attractions ==
=== Annual cultural events ===
- Hyottoko Summer Festival (ひょっとこ夏祭り, hyottoko natsu matsuri) takes place the first Friday and Saturday of August every year. This is the largest festival in Hyuga City attracting visitors from all over Japan. The rather peculiar dance associated with this festival is not exclusive to Hyuga City, but this is the most famous Hyottoko dance in Japan; as such it and the characters in the dance have become symbols of the city.
- Hyuga Jugoya Festival (日向十五夜祭, hyuga jugoya matsuri) takes place during September or October in accordance to the harvest moon. In Hyuga City, this event features two dances, the more traditional Jugoya dance and a traditional dance specific to the Togo region. This is the second largest festival in Hyuga City.

=== Museums and other points of interest ===
- Hyuga Historical and Folk Museum (日向市歴史民俗資料館, Hyūgashi rekishi minzoku shiryōkan)
- Bokusui Wakayama Memorial Museum of Literature (若山牧水記念文学館, Wakayama bokusui kinen bungaku-kan)
- Hososhima Port Museum (細島みなと資料館旧高鍋屋, Hososhima Minato shiryōkan kyū Takanabe-ya)

== Notable people from Hyūga ==
- Norichika Aoki, Major League Baseball player
- Takami Eto, politician
- Masatora Kawano, Japanese racewalking athlete
- Bokusui Wakayama, poet
