= The Devil's Advocate (West novel) =

1959 novel by Morris L. West

- First UK edition, third pressing
- Author: Morris West
- Language: English
- Publisher: William Morrow (US); Heinemann (UK)
- Publication date: 1959
- Publication place: Australia
- Media type: Print (Hardback & Paperback)
- Pages: 319 pp
- ISBN: 0-671-81252-1 (1971 edition)
- Preceded by: McCreary Moves In
- Followed by: The Naked Country

The Devil's Advocate is a 1959 novel by Australian author Morris West. It forms part of West's "Vatican" sequence of novels, along with The Shoes of the Fisherman (1963), The Clowns of God (1981), and Lazarus (1990).

== Plot ==
Father Blaise Meredith, an urbane and cultured English priest who has passed his unexceptional life at the Vatican, is diagnosed with a terminal disease. He is sent from Rome to a small Calabrian village (Gemello Maggiore) as 'devil's advocate', investigating the life of Giacomo Nerone, a dead local being promoted for sainthood. Meredith has been chosen by Cardinal Marotta for this task, as someone learned and meticulous, perhaps lacking in charity or passion, but not in precision. Meredith expects to die quite soon. Gemello Maggiore's residents are promoting Nerone's cult which will bring prestige and prosperity to a typically post-war, impoverished, rural community in Southern Italy.

Meredith discovers that Nerone was in fact a deserter from the British army, who had an illegitimate son by a local woman, and was executed by Communist partisans towards the end of World War II, yet is a man revered in his small village. In the process, Meredith meets the local Mayor, the Contessa (dissatisfied, ageing beauty, socialite and landowner), her house-guest (a homosexual painter from Rome), Nerone's mistress and their illegitimate son, now a handsome teenager whom the Contessa and her painter friend want to adopt and move to Rome (i.e. corrupt). Caught between these conflicting individuals and motives, Meredith struggles to understand the truth about the alleged saint, fulfil his final duty for the Roman Catholic church, and come to terms with his own mortality and challenged religious faith.

== Development ==
Fluent in both French and Italian, West visited southern Italy in the 1950s, where he wrote the 1957 non-fiction Children of the Sun, which described the lives of street urchins in Naples. As a result, he was offered a job as Vatican correspondent for the London Daily Mail.

== Awards and nominations ==
- James Tait Black Memorial Prize, 1959: winner
- W. H. Heinemann Award
- nominated for the 1960 National Book Award.

== Reception ==
Commonweal called it as “[a] superior novel, intricately worked out at several levels of human and spiritual quest...” The New York Times described it as “[a] reading experience of real emotional intensity.” Some reviewers compared him favorably with Graham Greene.

"Never a subtle writer, West makes his approach to timeless truths (and truisms) at a strictly popular level, includes some sex and much emotion, but has his elements of enigma and drama well in hand." (Kirkus Reviews)

In spite of a style which is more frequently deft than distinguished, The Devil's Advocate is a work of merit...As a novel it is a curious blend of slickness and profundity. It is almost as if a very good and mediocre novel had been stitched together with a jagged line to make one book....This book is well worth reading for its virtues and we have its faults to thank for its being read widely. Flannery O'Connor

In its first two years, The Devil's Advocate sold 3 million copies. It was staged on Broadway by Dory Schary. The Devil's Advocate is part of the "Loyola Classics" series of Loyola Press, which includes Miles Connolly's Mr. Blue and Rumer Godden's In this House of Brede.

== Notes ==
- Dedication: For Paul R. Reynolds.
- Epigraph: "I saw under the altar the souls of them that were slain for the word of God and for the testimony which they held." - Apocalypse vi. 9.

== Film adaptation ==
A film adaptation of this novel was produced as a West German release in 1977, and originally titled Des Teufels Advokat. The film was directed by Guy Green, from a screenplay written by Morris West. The film features John Mills, Leigh Lawson, Jason Miller, Daniel Massey, Paola Pitagora and Stéphane Audran.

== See also ==
- 1959 in Australian literature
