= The Second Victory =

The Second Victory may refer to:

- The Second Victory (film), a 1987 British drama film, based on the novel
- The Second Victory (novel), a 1958 novel by Morris West
