= Devil's advocate (disambiguation) =

The Devil's advocate was an official in the Catholic Church who would attempt to prove a candidate for canonization to not be a saint.

Devil's Advocate may also refer to:

== Books ==
- The Devil's Advocate, a 1990 novel by Andrew Neiderman
  - The Devil's Advocate (1997 film), a film, based on the Neiderman novel, starring Keanu Reeves and Al Pacino
  - The Devil's Advocate, a musical stage adaptation, whose libretto is written by Andrew Neiderman
- The Devil's Advocate, a 1952 novel by Taylor Caldwell
- The Devil's Advocate (West novel), a 1959 novel by Morris West
  - The Devil's Advocate (1977 film), a West German film adaptation of the Morris West novel; original title "Des Teufels Advokat" but shot in English
- Devil's Advocate, a 2000 biography by John Humphrys
- The Joker: Devil's Advocate, a 1996 comic book written by Chuck Dixon and drawn by Graham Nolan
- Devil's Advocate, a 1928 book by James George Frazer
- John Mortimer: The Devil's Advocate - The Unauthorised Biography, a 2005 biography by Graham Lord

== People ==
- Giovanni Di Stefano (fraudster) (born 1955), British-Italian faux lawyer, nicknamed "The Devil's Advocate" for his involvement in high-profile criminal cases
- Jacques Vergès (1925–2013), French attorney most famous for representing Klaus Barbie, "the Butcher of Lyon"

== Television and film ==
- The Devil's Advocate (1977 film), a West German film adaptation of the Morris West novel; original title "Des Teufels Advokat" but shot in English
- The Devil's Advocate (1997 film), a film, based on the Neiderman novel, starring Keanu Reeves and Al Pacino
- Devil's Advocate (1995 film), a 1995 British two-part television-film starring Alice Krige
- Devil's Advocate (TV series), a Dutch reality television series
- Devil's Advocate, a fictional pinball game appearing in "Insane Clown Poppy", an episode of The Simpsons
- The Devil's Advocate, a current affairs television series fronted by Darcus Howe on Channel 4 (1992–1996)
- The Devil's Advocates, a fictional motorcycle gang appearing in the film Nam's Angels
- Devil's Advocate, a chapter of the BBC documentary series Notorious about British fraudster Giovanni Di Stefano

== Other ==
- "The Devil's Advocate", a 2013 song by Christopher Lee, on Charlemagne: The Omens of Death

== See also ==
- The Advocate's Devil, a 1994 novel by Alan Dershowitz
- Devil's Chaplain (disambiguation)
