= Cassidy (miniseries) =

- Genre: Drama
- Based on: Cassidy by Morris West
- Written by: Joanna Murray-Smith
- Directed by: Carl Schultz; Derek Hayes
- Starring: Bill Hunter; Caroline Goodall; Martin Shaw
- Theme music composer: Paul Grabowsky
- Country of origin: Australia
- Original language: English
- No. of episodes: 2

Production
- Producers: Wayne Barry; Bob Weis
- Cinematography: Ellery Ryan
- Editors: Tony Kavanagh; Lyn Solly
- Production companies: Arrow Films; ABC; Bob Weis co-production
- Budget: $5.5 million

Original release
- Network: ABC Television
- Release: 25 October – 26 October 1989

Cassidy is a 1989 mini series, screened on ABC Television in Australia, based on the 1986 novel of the same title by Morris West. It told the story of Charles Parnell Cassidy, a fictitious premier of New South Wales. It screened on BBC One in May 1990.

== Plot ==
Charles Parnell Cassidy, the premier of New South Wales, arrives in London to visit his estranged daughter, Charlotte (also known as "Charlie"). Cassidy commits suicide, leaving Charlie a briefcase with a video and computer discs. The video explains his death, and details his corrupt dealings, which are substantiated by the evidence on the disks. As executor of Cassidy's estate, Charlie is given the option of selling the files to Cassidy's business partner for $20 million, handing them over to the NSW Attorney-General or carrying on her father's business. She returns to Sydney to deal with his political and business legacies.

Charlie's central role in the plot is a departure from West's novel, which used Cassidy's son-in-law as the main protagonist. Writer Murray-Smith said that she thought it was more interesting to use the daughter to drive the plot, with the opportunity to examine the "whole notion of blood ties" and inheritance.

== Cast ==
- Bill Hunter as Charles Parnell Cassidy
- Caroline Goodall as Charlie Cassidy
- Martin Shaw as James Griffin
- Denis Quilley as Marcus Melville
- Philip Quast as Sam East
- Tracy Mann as Kate
- Pat Bishop as Clare Cassidy
- Pauline Chan as Alice Wu
- Anthony Brandon Wong as Wayne
- Peter Carroll as Gotham

== Production ==
The series was a co-production of the ABC and Bob Weis. In 1988, Five Arrows Films Pty Ltd, an investment vehicle managed by Rothschild Bank Australia, had bought the rights to nine of West's works. Cassidy was the only one of these works to be produced as a film or television series.

== Reception ==
The mini-series garnered generally positive reviews in the major metropolitan newspapers. The television critic for The Age in Melbourne called it "exciting ... the drama created by [Charlie's] adventures is powerful and entertaining." The Sydney Morning Herald's critic called it "an almost (but not quite) super political thriller", singling out Goodall's "outstanding performance" as Charlie and Murray-Smith's "beautiful screenplay". The Sun-Herald's critic noted the "superb international cast, glamorous locations and a rattling good plot".

In Sydney, the first episode won the non-news ratings for the evening, with a 16-point share. The second episode, with a 14-point share, was beaten by the final season episode of Fast Forward and the movie An Eye for an Eye.
