= Master class (disambiguation) =

A master class is a specialized class taught by an expert.

Master class or masterclass with upper-/lower-case variants may also refer to:

- Master Class, a play by Terrence McNally
- Masterclass (TV series), an HBO documentary series
- MasterClass, an online education platform
- Masterclass (novel), a 1988 novel by Morris West
- Master Class, a play by David Pownall
- "Master Class", a 2021 song by Keung To

== See also ==
- Oprah's Master Class
