= The Second Victory (novel) =

1958 novel by Morris West

- 1970 edition
- Author: Morris West
- Language: English
- Publisher: Heinemann
- Publication date: 1958
- Publication place: Australia
- Media type: Print
- Pages: 281 pp.
- Preceded by: The Big Story
- Followed by: The Devil's Advocate

The Second Victory is a 1958 novel by Morris West. It was also known as Backlash.

== Premise ==
In post war Austria, Major Mark Hanlon, Occupation Commander of the alpine town of Bad Quellenberg, investigates the murder of his driver.

== Reception ==
The Bulletin wrote "West is concerned here more with the nature of justice, mercy and moral responsibility in war and peace than with thriller-writing; which is a pity, because his very plain Catholicism, though impressively sincere, produces very little original insight into any of these things."

== Film Version ==
Universal Pictures bought the film rights and West wrote the script in the late 1950s. In November 1958 Henry Denker was hired to write the script, for producer Robert Arthur, by which time the title had changed to A Gathering of Eagles. However no movie resulted until 1987.
