= The Crooked Road =

1965 British film by Don Chaffey

- Directed by: Don Chaffey
- Written by: Don Chaffey; Jay Garrison
- Based on: novel by Morris West
- Starring: Robert Ryan; Stewart Granger
- Cinematography: Stephen Dade
- Production company: Argo
- Distributed by: Seven Arts Productions
- Release date: 19 September 1965
- Running time: 92 min.
- Country: United Kingdom
- Language: English

The Crooked Road is a 1965 British film directed and co-written by Don Chaffey. It stars Stewart Granger, Robert Ryan and Janet Munro. It is based on the 1957 novel The Big Story by Morris West. An American journalist plans to expose as a crook the dictator of a small Balkan state, but finds himself framed for murder.

== Cast ==
- Robert Ryan as Richard Ashley
- Stewart Granger as Duke of Orgagna
- Nadia Gray as Cosima
- Katherine Woodville as Elena
- Marius Goring as Harlequin
- Robert Rietty as the Chief of Police

== Production ==
The film was shot in and around the city of Split and on the Adriatic coast of Yugoslavia (now Croatia) over two months.

== Reception ==
The New York Times said the film "bounces along nicely".
