= Summer of the Red Wolf =

Novel by Australian writer Morris West

- Author: Morris West
- Language: English
- Genre: Fiction
- Publisher: Heinemann
- Publication date: 1971
- Publication place: Australia
- Media type: Print
- Pages: 278 pp
- ISBN: 0434859117
- Preceded by: The Tower of Babel
- Followed by: The Salamander

Summer of the Red Wolf (1971) is a novel by Australian writer Morris West.

== Epigraph ==
"A wolf must die in its own skin" [George Herbert: Jacula Prudentum]

== Synopsis ==
The novel is set in the Outer Hebrides and concerns an emotional love triangle between Ruarri Matheson (a dashing Scotsman and the Red Wolf of the title), Kathleen MacNeill (a doctor recovering from a broken marriage) and the narrator, who is a writer recovering from a near breakdown.

== Critical reception ==
Brian Jeffrey, writing in The Canberra Times, thought the novel "not up to West's past standard." He continued: "Perhaps we have become too accustomed to Mr West fictionalising the sophisticated troubles of the modern world to accept his sudden departure into the land of the earthy, apple-cheeked women and their sea-scored, sturdy men folk...In all, the novel is readable and rewarding, but lovers of Morris West will probably be disappointed and a little perturbed at his latest effort."

In her literary study of West and his work, Maryanne Confoy noted: "The novel is West's analysis of his Far Isles experience. It describes a middle-aged writer's struggles to find answers to his experience of inner darkness and conflict. The man, 'a stranger to myself' in 'a hostile place', looks back on the broken 'scraps and shards' of his life, asks whether it has been of any worth, and tries to find some clarity and meaning in the midst of confusion and questions...The book enabled West to describe the two selves within and his personal effort to find absolution for the experiences that had blocked his inner world with shame too painful to speak about personally."

== Publication history ==
After its original publication in 1971 in England by publishers Heinemann the novel was later published as follows:

- William Morrow, USA, 1971
- Pocket Books, USA, 1972
- Allen & Unwin, Australia, 2017

and many other paperback editions.

The novel was also translated into Dutch in 1971.

== See also ==
- 1971 in Australian literature
