= The Salamander (West novel) =

Novel by Australian writer Morris West

- Author: Morris West
- Language: English
- Genre: Fiction
- Publisher: Heinemann
- Publication date: 1973
- Publication place: Australia
- Media type: Print
- Pages: 304pp.
- ISBN: 0434859125
- Preceded by: Summer of the Red Wolf
- Followed by: Harlequin

The Salamander (1973) is a novel by Australian writer Morris West.

== Synopsis ==
Dante Matucci, a captain in the Italian secret service, begins an investigation into the death of an Italian general, found dead in his apartment. Next to the body was a small card depicting a salamander in a bed of flames. Soon Matucci discovers that the Salamander is really a millionaire industrialist Bruno Manzini, and he is drawn into a difficult investigation.

== Critical reception ==
John Philip, writing in The Canberra Times, found the novel "a tale that will enthrall fans of action-packed topical novels." And he concluded: "This may not be Morris West's best novel, but it makes arresting reading and will find favour with a wide range of readers."

== Publication history ==
After its original publication in 1973 in England by Heinemann the novel was later published by William Morrow in 1973, Pocket Books in 1974, and Allen & Unwin in 2017, and many other paperback editions, including a German translation in 1973.

== Film adaptation ==
In 1981, Peter Zinner's directorial debut, The Salamander, was derived from West's book, on a screenplayed by Robert Kratz and Rod Serling. It featured:

- Franco Nero as Carabinieri Colonel Dante Matucci
- Anthony Quinn as Bruno Manzini
- Martin Balsam as Captain Steffanelli

== Notes ==
- Dedication: "For Silvio Stefano, wise councellor, honest advocate, friend of my heart"
- Epigraph:

If we could learn to look instead of gawking,
We'd see the horror in the heart of farce.
If only we could act instead of talking,
We would not always end up on our arse.
This was the thing that had us nearly mastered!
Don't yet rejoice in his defeat, you men.
For though the world stood up and stopped the bastard,
The bitch that bore him is on heat again.

From Arturo Ui by Bertolt Brecht, translated by George Tabori

== See also ==
- 1973 in Australian literature
