= Unknown Woman (1969 film) =

- Directed by: Luigi Comencini
- Screenplay by: Suso Cecchi D'Amico
- Story by: Suso Cecchi D'Amico
- Produced by: Luigi Comencini
- Starring: Philippe Leroy
- Cinematography: Pasqualino De Santis
- Edited by: Nino Baragli
- Music by: Ennio Morricone
- Release date: 1969
- Running time: 96 minutes
- Language: Italian

Unknown Woman (Italian: Senza sapere niente di lei, lit. 'Without knowing anything about her') is a 1969 Italian giallo film produced and directed by Luigi Comencini. It is based on the novel La morale privata by Antonio Leonviola. For this film Paola Pitagora was awarded with a Silver Ribbon for best actress.

== Cast ==
- Philippe Leroy as Nanni Brà
- Paola Pitagora as Cinzia
- Sara Franchetti as Pia
- Graziella Galvani as Giovanna
- Silvano Tranquilli as Zeppegno
- Umberto D'Orsi as Dante
