= Proteus (West novel) =

Novel by Australian writer Morris West

- Author: Morris West
- Language: English
- Genre: Fiction
- Publisher: Collins
- Publication date: 1979
- Publication place: Australia
- Media type: Print
- Pages: 273 pp.
- ISBN: 0002216744
- Preceded by: The Navigator
- Followed by: The Clowns of God

Proteus (1979) is a novel by Australian writer Morris West. It was originally published by Collins in England in 1979.

== Synopsis ==
The novel's protagonist is John Spada, an Italian-American who leads a multinational corporation. He also secretly heads a covert organisation called Proteus, aiming to free prisoners of conscience around the world. To achieve this, Proteus threatens to release a deadly botulism culture into selected cities' water supply.

== Critical reception ==
John Philip in The Canberra Times thought that the "essence of a gripping yarn is there; but the story, as it unfolds, falters and finally fails." He concluded: "All in all, a disappointing novel. A great deal of action is developed around a topical theme; but finally Morris West loses touch with reality."

In her literary study of West and his work, Maryanne Confoy noted: "In Proteus West was trying to discover whether the goodness of one human being could triumph over the evil of another. If the thoroughly evil person violated a thoroughly good person, could such a violation be overcome by goodness alone?"

== Publication history ==
After its original publication in 1979 in England by publishers Collins the novel was later published by William Morrow, in the United States, in 1979, and by Allen & Unwin in Australia, 2017, as well as in many other paperback editions.

The novel was translated into Dutch, Italian, Portuguese, Brazilian, Danish, Norwegian, German, French and Spanish in 1979; Finnish, Swedish and Japanese in 1980; Hebrew in 1982; and Slovenian in 1985.

== Notes ==
It was dedicated "For the Prisoners of Conscience of whom to our shame there are far too many." Its epigraph, from Modern Man in Search of a Soul, by C. G. Jung, is "It is becoming more and more obvious that it is not starvation, not microbes, not cancer, but man himself who is mankind's greatest danger because he has no adequate protection against psychic epidemics, which are infinitely more devasting in their effect than the greatest natural catastrophes."

== See also ==
- 1979 in Australian literature
