= Fire and Sword =

1981 film by Veith von Fürstenberg

- Directed by: Veith von Fürstenberg
- Screenplay by: Max Zihlmann
- Story by: Veith von Fürstenberg
- Based on: Tristan and Isolde
- Produced by: Peter Genée; Don Geraghty
- Starring: Christoph Waltz; Antonia Preser; Leigh Lawson; Peter Firth
- Cinematography: Jacques Steyn
- Edited by: Barbara von Weitershausen
- Music by: Robert Lovas
- Release date: 1981
- Running time: 95 minutes
- Countries: West Germany; Ireland
- Languages: German, English

Fire and Sword (German: Feuer und Schwert: Die Legende von Tristan und Isolde) is a 1981 romantic drama film directed by Veith von Fürstenberg. It is based on the legend of Tristan and Isolde, played by Christoph Waltz (in his first leading credited film role) and Antonia Preser. Leigh Lawson and Peter Firth also star. Set during a raging war between Cornwall and Ireland, the film explores themes on conflict between magic and religion, violence, and destruction.

Principal photography took place from July to November 1980. It was filmed in Ireland at the same location as Excalibur (1981), another Arthurian film, and reused the stuntmen and horses from that production. Critics praised its cinematography, for which it won an award at the 1983 Sitges Film Festival, but criticised the script, Waltz's and Preser's performances, and its interpretation of the source material.

== Plot ==
As war rages between Cornwall and Ireland, the Cornish knight Tristan defeats Morholt, a formidable Irish warrior, in combat. Tristan himself is gravely injured and drifts out to sea, eventually landing on the coast of Ireland. He pretends to be a minstrel named Tantris and is treated at a convent by the Irish princess Isolde, who is disguised as a maid. As Tristan recovers, they fall in love—even after Isolde examines his sword and deduces that he killed Morholt—and when he is called back to the Cornish court, he promises to return for her.

Tristan's uncle, King Marke of Cornwall, plans to establish peace through a political marriage to Isolde. Tristan volunteers to escort the princess to Cornwall. When he arrives in Ireland again, he and Isolde are each astounded to learn of the other's true identity. Tristan, who is fiercely loyal to the king, rejects Isolde's suggestion that they run away together. She prepares a potion that will cause its drinkers to fall senselessly in love forever and mixes it into both her and Tristan's wine. In Cornwall, Isolde weds Marke immediately but the potion exerts its influence on her and Tristan. They regularly meet in secret with the assistance of their servants, Brangäne and Gorvenal. Andret, a court advisor who seeks the throne, eventually exposes their tryst.

Confronted with the reality about his nephew and his wife, Marke orders their imprisonment and execution. Tristan escapes and Isolde is spared with the help of Tristan's friend Dinas. She is sentenced to live with a leper but is rescued by Tristan, and the lovers flee Cornwall. Three years later, Cornwall is under attack by the Irish, led by the traitorous Andret. Dinas finds Tristan and Isolde and urges them to return to the court and reconcile with Marke. Though Tristan is unwilling, Isolde agrees because she feels responsible for the resumption of the war. She returns to Cornwall and undergoes trial by ordeal, holding a red-hot iron to establish her innocence and restore peace.

Tristan travels to Brittany alone. He rescues a peasant woman from robbers and cynically names her "Isolde". Some time later, he is mortally wounded and sends Gorvenal to ask Isolde of Ireland to visit him on his deathbed. Gorvenal returns to Cornwall, where Andret has taken the throne. Marke learns of Gorvenal's plan and agrees to mobilise his knights to safely escort Isolde out of Cornwall. Andret is killed in the ensuing commotion. As Isolde sails to Brittany, the jealous Breton maid lies to Tristan about the color of the sails on the returning boat, implying that Gorvenal's mission was unsuccessful. He dies, and when Isolde arrives to see him, she collapses in grief and joins him in death.

== Cast ==
- Christoph Waltz as Tristan
- Antonia Preser as Isolde
- Leigh Lawson as King Marke
- Peter Firth as Dinas
- Walo Lüönd as Gorvenal
- Christine Wipf as Brangäne
- Kurt Raab as Ganelon
- Vladek Sheybal as Andret

== Themes ==
=== Magic versus religion ===
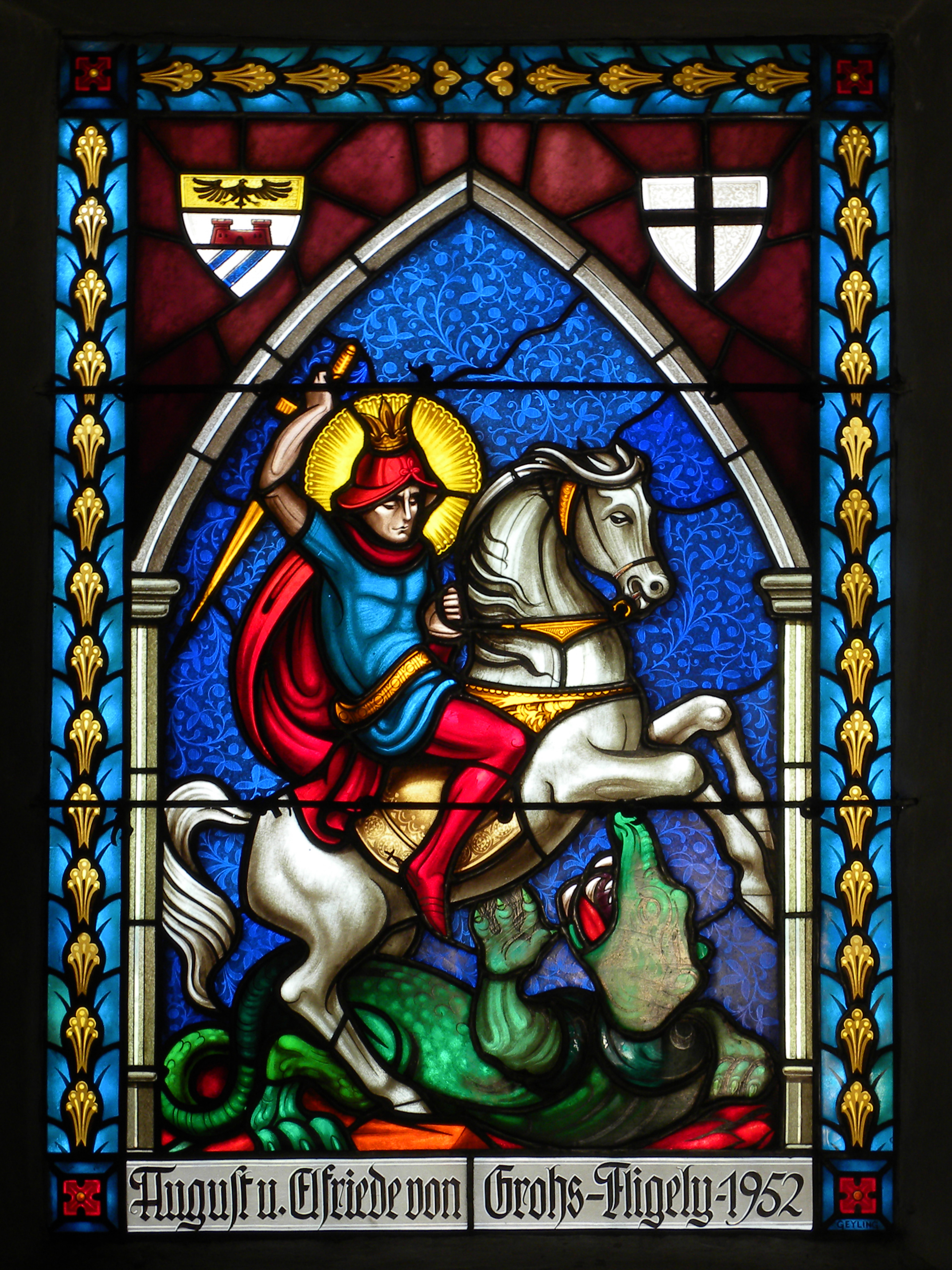
Saint George and the Dragon on a stained glass window similar to the one Tristan destroys in the film

In his analysis of the film, the literary scholar Stefan Keppler-Tasaki commented that it is "clearly critical of religion". The Irish nuns initially consider leaving Tristan to die of his injuries, citing a lack of room at their convent. The film then juxtaposes religion and sorcery, emphasising Isolde's powers as an sorceress as she heals Tristan with the use of magical herbs. Other elements of the film also symbolise the subversion of religion. During his escape, Tristan crashes through and destroys a stained glass icon of Saint George, patron of England, and Marke noticeably sets aside his personal wooden cross when he is rejected by Isolde. There is no mention of the Christian God; rather, Isolde describes an omnipotent goddess of love in reference to her and Tristan's magic-induced love.

Isolde's skills in magic are a recurring element, notably as she brews the love potion that she and Tristan later drink. Her preparation of the potion is a distinctive plot element among film depictions of Tristan and Isolde (in the 1981 film Lovespell, she similarly adds the potion with knowledge of its effects, but it was given to her by her guardian). She is characterised as "the magical catalyst of the story" and her magic elevates the importance of her role above Tristan's. The literary scholar Alain Kerdelhue suggested that the film could have alternatively been titled Isolde la Sorcière (French for Isolde the Sorceress) for its emphasis on Isolde as a magical figure.

=== Apocalyptic violence ===
The film's title, Fire and Sword, suggests its recurring motif of destruction and violence. The characters are caught in a political war that Marke continually escalates, and even Isolde's sacrificial return to the king is not enough to end the violence. The death of Tristan and Isolde is preceded by the apocalyptic destruction of Cornwall. The final scene, in which Gorvenal lights a funeral pyre and cremates the lovers, emphasises the high cost of the war and is reminiscent of the film's original title, Fire and Ashes. Fürstenberg made frequent use of short, discontinuous shots; Keppler-Tasaki commented that this editing style evokes "political, social, and epistemological fragmentation".

The pervasion of violence distinguishes the film from Richard Wagner's 19th-century opera Tristan und Isolde and restores elements from early source material that Wagner had cut, including Isolde's trial and sentencing. In contrast to Wagner's rich, emotional setting focused on only a few characters, Fürstenberg combined a simplified film set with a large number of characters, many of whom are ultimately killed in the war. The medieval scholar Joan Tasker Grimbert wrote that Fire and Sword demonstrates the effects of economic determinism, which "individuals cannot oppose without destroying both the social order and themselves". Keppler-Tasaki similarly comments on Tristan and Isolde's rebellion against the established order, observing that it inevitably led to the breakdown of society.

== Production ==
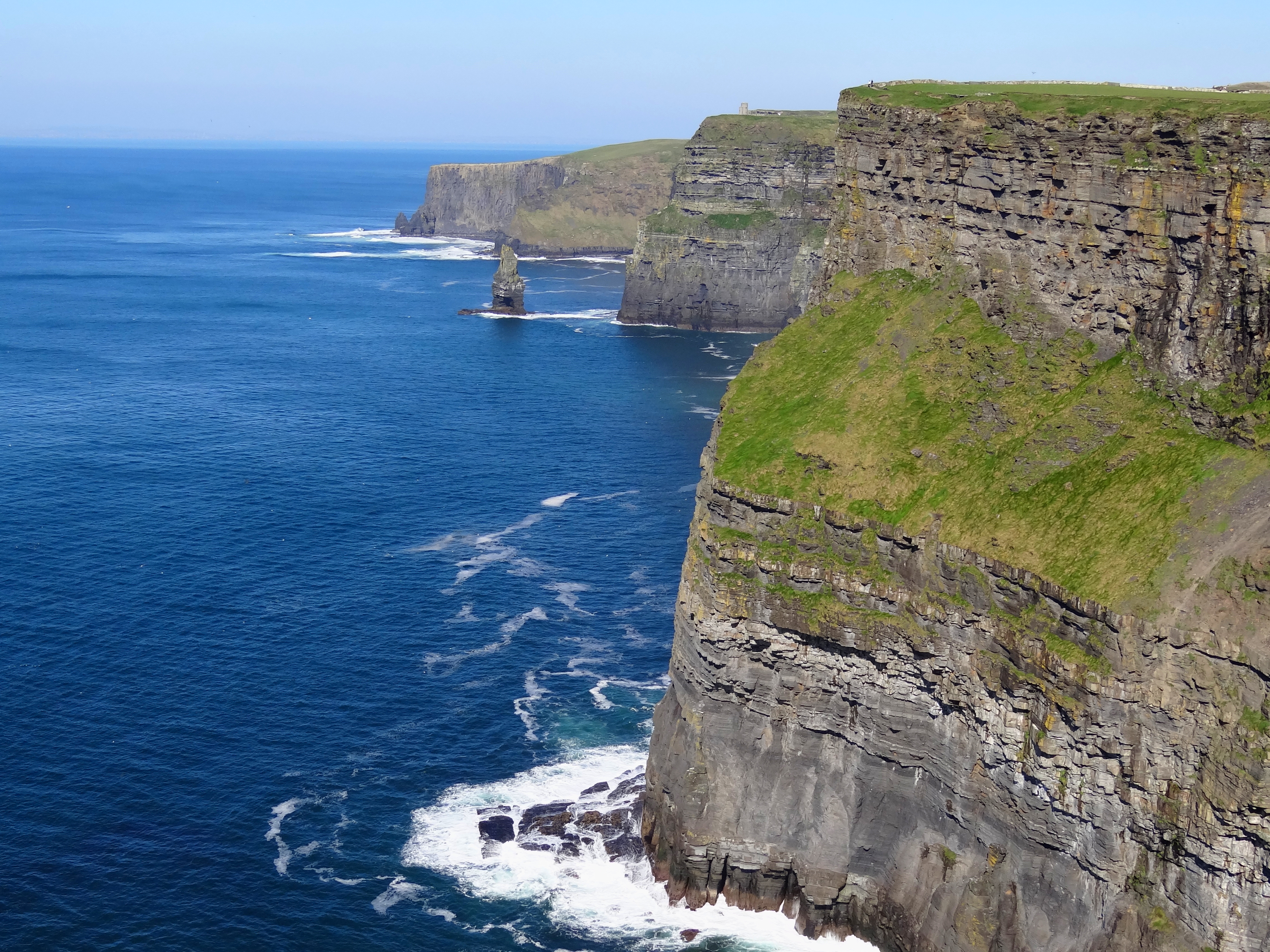
Some scenes were filmed at the Cliffs of Moher.

The film was jointly produced by seven companies: Genee & von Fürstenberg Filmproduktionsgesellschaft, Popular-Film, DNS-Filmproduktion, Film-Fernsehen-Autoren-Team (FFAT), Dieter Geissler Filmproduktion, Don Geraghty Film Services, and ZDF.

Principal photography took place from July to November 1980 on Achill Island, an isle of Ireland, and at the Cliffs of Moher. Some scenes were filmed in La Spezia, Italy. According to Peter Genée, one of the producers, filming took place under difficult conditions, including a fuel strike and frequent rainy conditions. The knights' chain mail costumes often shrank during filming and the actors had to be cut out of the expensive costumes. Filming was occasionally suspended due to gale-force winds at the Cliffs of Moher, which damaged the cameras. Christoph Waltz, who was a relatively unknown actor at the time, trained in skills including stage combat and horse riding for three months in preparation for the film. Genée recounted that the scene in which Tristan drifts out to sea after battling Morholt was a dangerous one to film due to the high surf conditions.

Fire and Sword was produced around the same time as several other films based on Arthurian legend, including Excalibur (1981) and Lovespell. It was filmed at the same location in Ireland as Excalibur. In his production notes, Genée wrote that he and Fürstenberg were sitting in the National Film Studios of Ireland (now Ardmore Studios) in Dublin in April 1980 when they saw the stuntmen from Excalibur dressed as knights and on horseback. After Excalibur finished production, the stuntmen and horses were hired for the filming of Fire and Sword.

== Reception ==
Fire and Sword was screened at the Marché du Film on 20 May 1981 with the title Tristan und Isolde (Tristan and Isolde). A reviewer for Variety praised the film's cinematography and described it as "beautifully lensed", but felt that Waltz and Preser were too inexperienced for the leading roles. The reviewer also observed the film's departure from Wagner's version of the Tristan and Isolde legend, writing that "this is a close-enough rendition of the original legend". It was later screened at the 1983 Sitges Film Festival, where it received the award for best cinematography.

The film received negative reviews from contemporary German critics. Gerald Druminski of the film magazine Film und Fernsehen criticised Waltz's and Preser's performances as well as the script. He considered Fire and Sword neither a strong historical epic film nor a unique interpretation of the source material. In a review for Filmdienst, Hubert Haslberger labeled the film a failure compared to Excalibur. In particular, he felt that the depiction of Isolde as a witch-like femme fatale was too shallow, and that the film discarded the mythical quality of the legend. Unlike Excalibur, the film did not achieve commercial success, with an estimated 15,000 tickets being sold when it was shown in theatres.

Since its release, Fire and Sword has been routinely included and analyzed among other films based on Arthurian legend. The medieval scholar Kevin J. Harty described it as "probably the most faithful film version of the medieval legend of Tristan and Isolde". The New Arthurian Encyclopedia, edited by Norris J. Lacy, states that it "is distinguished by its poetic images, but it inclines to an apathy that does not do justice to the material", unlike films such as Excalibur and Perceval le Gallois (1978).
