= The Navigator (West novel) =

Novel by Australian writer Morris West

- Author: Morris West
- Language: English
- Genre: Fiction
- Publisher: Collins
- Publication date: 1976
- Publication place: Australia
- Media type: Print
- Pages: 303 pp.
- ISBN: 0002222671
- Preceded by: Harlequin
- Followed by: Proteus

The Navigator (1976) is a novel by Australian writer Morris West. It was originally published by Collins in England in 1976.

== Synopsis ==
Gunnar Thorkild, half Polynesian and half European, the "navigator" of the title, mounts an expedition to the Island of the Dead, a legendary Polynesian island where, supposedly, all navigators go before their death.

== Critical reception ==
Lyn Frost, in The Canberra Times, noted: "The theme is one that recurs so often in West's novels, of a man confronting his belief in his god. The author has moved from the dogma of Rome to the dreaming of the Pacific and written one of his best."

Eileen Alderton was rather blunt in her assessment of the novel: "Thinking of getting away for it all on a lost Pacific island? After reading this you won't."

In her literary study of West and his work, Maryanne Confoy noted: "The tranquility of the 60-year-old West...resonates in The Navigator though conversations which affirm honesty in relationships, and people's decisions to look inwards and make some judgements about their lives in the context of their early hopes and dreams."

== Publication history ==
After its original publication in 1976 in England by publishers Collins the novel was later published as follows:

- William Morrow, USA, 1976
- Pocket Books, USA, 1977
- Allen & Unwin, Australia, 2017

and many other paperback editions.

The novel was translated into Spanish in 1976.

== Notes ==
- Dedication: "This book is for those of us, / Children still, / Who, even at the gates of midnight, / Dream of sunrise."
- Epigraph:

Some island
With the sea's silence on it...

Pippa Passes Part ii, Robert Browning

== See also ==
- 1976 in Australian literature
