= Lazarus (West novel) =

Novel by Australian writer Morris West

- Author: Morris West
- Language: English
- Genre: Fiction
- Publisher: Heinemann
- Publication date: 1990
- Publication place: Australia
- Media type: Print
- Pages: 296 pp.
- ISBN: 0855613467
- Preceded by: Masterclass
- Followed by: The Ringmaster

Lazarus (1990) is a novel by Australian writer Morris West. It was originally published by Heinemann in England in 1990.

This is the third book in West's "Vatican trilogy", following The Shoes of the Fisherman and The Clowns of God.

== Synopsis ==
Pope Leo XIV is a staunch conservative, the product of the Vatican hierarchy. But when he recovers from double-bypass heart surgery he undergoes a philosophical change of heart and begins to see the world in a new light. He now aims to change the Doctrine of the Faith away from being repressive, secretive and authoritarian. Interwoven with this new philosophy is the discovery of a plot to assassinate the Pope while he recovers from his surgery in a Swiss clinic.

== Critical reception ==
Writing in The Canberra Times Ralph Elliott noted: "I doubt whether Mr West is much troubled by academic neglect. Lazarus not merely confirms his standing as a consummate storyteller; it forces the reader to ponder not only the role of the Church in today's world, nor just the constant threat of terrorism for whatever fanatical cause, nor the fates of individuals caught up in moral or political quandaries, but perhaps most of all what the novel's title implies."

In her literary study of West and his work, Maryanne Confoy noted: "In Lazarus, West's concern about the apparently increasing irrelevance of the Church in a world where abuse of human rights abounded was based on his conviction that there was a desperate need for the Christian message of love, peace and justice that was the Church's missions to proclaim to all people. West's personal vision is communicated through Leo's description of his hope in the future as a consequence of his own change of heart, the same change of heart that is available to all people in their own relational contexts."

== Publication history ==
After its original publication in 1990 in England by publishers Heinemann the novel was later published as follows:

- St. Martin's Press, USA, 1990
- Allen & Unwin, Australia, 2017

and many other paperback editions.

The novel was translated into Spanish in 1990.

== See also ==
- 1990 in Australian literature

== Notes ==
- Dedication: "For Joy with love, the best of the summer wine"
- Epigraph: Lines from Leo XIV Pont. Max., Conversations, beginning, "I've always wondered about Lazarus."
