= Kundu (West novel) =

1956 novel by Morris West

- Author: Morris West
- Language: English
- Publisher: Dell
- Publication date: 1956
- Publication place: Australia
- Media type: Print
- Preceded by: Gallows on the Sand
- Followed by: The Big Story

Kundu is a 1956 Australian novel by Morris West. It was one of West's first novels - the second published under his own name - and was reportedly written in only three weeks. A 1993 review of West's career said the novel was a "potboiler" redeemed by his descriptions of New Guinea.

It was reprinted paperback in 1978.

== Premise ==
A story of people living in a village in the New Guinea highlands. They include the mysterious doctor Kurt Sonderfield, a former Nazi; a native girl N'Daria; a sorcerer called Kumo, an old French missionary Pere Louis; Sonderfield's wife Gerda; a coffee company agent, Theodore Nelson; Lee Curtis, the patrol officer; Oliver, the Assistant District Officer; and an anthropologist, Nelson.

== Reception ==
The Pacific Islands Monthly called it "a sexy piece."

The Bulletin said "Well written and swift-moving, with touches of interesting characterisation and much lurid lore of the country, the novel passes away an hour or so pleasantly enough; but by the adoption of these dime-novel plots Mr. West really removes his work from serious consideration."
