= The Ambassador (West novel) =

Novel by Morris West

- First edition
- Author: Morris West
- Language: English
- Publisher: Fontana Books
- Publication date: 1965
- Publication place: Australia
- Preceded by: The Shoes of the Fisherman
- Followed by: The Tower of Babel

The Ambassador is a novel by Australian author Morris West. It was first published in 1965. The novel is fictionalisation of the period leading up to and shortly after the Coup d'état against and assassination of South Vietnamese President Ngo Dinh Diem.

First published in English in 1965, the book has been translated into 13 other languages, including French and Vietnamese.

== Reception ==
Kirkus Reviews began with "What timing! To have a novel ready for the No. 1 headline issue in the world is the sort of luck authors go to sleep dreaming about" and ended that it was a "Book-of-the-Month Club selection".

In her 1965 review for The Bulletin, Leonie Kramer considered that it was written "under the guise of fiction" but that the "examination of Amberley's character kills him and the book's impact as fiction in one blow."

Other reviews were published in The Times Literary Supplement, The New York Times Book Review, Harper's Magazine, The New Yorker, and Australian Book Review.
