= The Salamander (1981 film) =

1981 thriller film directed by Peter Zinner

- DVD cover
- Directed by: Peter Zinner
- Written by: Robert Katz; Rod Serling
- Based on: The Salamander (1973 novel) by Morris West
- Produced by: Paul Maslansky
- Starring: Franco Nero; Anthony Quinn
- Cinematography: Marcello Gatti
- Edited by: Claudio M. Cutry; Katina Zinner
- Music by: Jerry Goldsmith
- Production company: ITC Films International; Opera Film Produzione; Pacific Theatres; Orbi S.A.
- Distributed by: ITC Entertainment
- Release date: 25 April 1981 (UK)
- Running time: 96 minutes
- Language: English

The Salamander (Italian: La salamandra) is a 1981 political thriller film directed by Peter Zinner, written by Robert Katz and Rod Serling, and starring Franco Nero, Anthony Quinn, Sybil Danning, Christopher Lee, Claudia Cardinale and Eli Wallach.It is based on the Morris West's 1973 novel, and follows an Italian secret service officer (Nero) trying to stop a neofascist coup. It was the only directorial effort by Zinner, who was an Oscar-winning film editor.

== Plot ==
Italian secret service colonel Dante Matucci investigates a series of murders involving people in prominent positions. Left behind at each murder scene is a drawing of a salamander. As the body count grows he sees a pattern that might point to a neofascist conspiracy to take over the Italian government.

== Cast ==
- Franco Nero as Col. Dante Matucci
- Anthony Quinn as Bruno Manzini
- Martin Balsam as Capt. Steffanelli
- Sybil Danning as Lili Anders
- Christopher Lee as Prince Baldassare
- Cleavon Little as Maj. Carl Malinowski, USMC
- Claudia Cardinale as Elena Leporello
- Eli Wallach as Gen. Leporello
- Paul L. Smith as 'The Surgeon'
- John Steiner as Capt. Roditi
- Renzo Palmer as Maj. Giorgione
- Anita Strindberg as Princess Faubiani
- Marino Masé as Capt. Rigoli
- Jacques Herlin as 'Woodpecker'
- Fortunato Arena as Gen. Pantaleone
- Andrea Esterhazy as Minister of Defence
- Massimo Ciprari as Gino Orlando
- Gitte Lee as Princess Baldassare
- Tony Brandt as Gianni Bandanelli
- Nello Pazzafini as Manzini's Bodyguard
