= The Last Confession (novel) =

Novel by Australian writer Morris West

- Author: Morris West
- Language: English
- Genre: Fiction
- Publisher: HarperCollins
- Publication date: 2000
- Publication place: Australia
- Media type: Print
- Pages: 214 pp.
- ISBN: 0732265959
- Preceded by: Eminence

The Last Confession (2000) is a novel by Australian writer Morris West. It was originally published by HarperCollins in Australia in 2000.

It was West's last novel and was published posthumously.

== Synopsis ==
The novel concerns the trials and imprisonment of Giordano Bruno who was burned at the stake for heresy in 1600. It details Bruno's life, his religious beliefs and his final days in prison.

== Background ==
West died while working at his desk on the final chapters of this novel. Giordano Bruno was a person with whom West had long sympathised and even identified. In 1969 he had published a blank-verse play, The Heretic, on the same subject. This was staged in London in 1970. Of all his writings, he said this play had "the most of me in it". In 1998 he converted it into a libretto for an opera, which was set to music by Colin Brumby but which has not been staged. In early 1999 he also contemplated a film script based on the play. He wrote The Last Confession in the form of the diary that Bruno might have written knowing that execution was approaching.

The diary was intended to cover the period 21 December 1599 to 17 February 1600, however it covers just 14 days; the entry West was writing when he died was dated 4 January 1600 and he had written only about half as much as he had intended. Nevertheless, the last paragraph he ever wrote was poignant: I can write no more today … who knows to what nightmares I might wake. West had had several severe heart attacks and undergone double-bypass surgery. Murray Waldren writes: "This is a book written by a man aware death is imminent about a man aware execution is near". West's family decided to publish it in 2000, in an incomplete form and without any editing, leaving readers free to imagine how the story might have ended. It has a foreword by Thomas Keneally, an editor's note by his publisher Angelo Loukakis and an epilogue co-written by his assistant Beryl Barraclough and his widow Joy West.

== Critical reception ==
In his foreword to the first edition, Tom Keneally wrote: "This is a book suffused by the expectation of death and the necessity of love as the sole viable riposte to it. It is not a secret to Morris's friends and readers that he was a man of the broadest compassion. His love of humanity was combined with a confident worldliness and a sharp awareness of the temptations which orthodoxy held out to those of authoritarian, absolutist bent. He knew that passion for the strictest orthodoxy was a besetting human problem, applying equally to the ideologies of the Inquisition as to the devotees of certain modern economic and political theories."

In her literary study of West and his work, Maryanne Confoy noted: "West tired physically as he aged, but he appeared not to have tired of his engagement with God and with God's people whom he took so seriously as readers and as audience. In The Last Confession West invited his readers to share his journey of faith, hope and love of God, each in their own way and from their own starting points."

== Publication history ==
After its original publication in 2000 in Australia by publishers HarperCollins the novel was later published as follows:

- Compass Press, USA, 2000
- Isis, UK, 2001
- Allen & Unwin, Australia, 2017

and many other paperback editions.

The novel was translated into Spanish in 2000; and Portuguese in 2001.

== See also ==
- 2000 in Australian literature

== Notes ==
- Dedication: "I wish to thank with all my heart Thomas Keneally for his generous and wonderful Foreword, Angelo Loukakis for his Editor's Note and Beryl Barraclough for her contribution to the Epilogue and help in many other ways. All of them together have made publication of this book possible." — Joy West
