= The Shoes of the Fisherman (film) =

1968 film by Michael Anderson

- Theatrical release poster by Howard Terpning
- Directed by: Michael Anderson
- Screenplay by: John Patrick; James Kennaway
- Based on: The Shoes of the Fisherman by Morris West
- Produced by: George Englund
- Starring: Anthony Quinn; Oskar Werner; David Janssen; Vittorio De Sica; Leo McKern; John Gielgud; Laurence Olivier
- Cinematography: Erwin Hillier
- Music by: Alex North
- Distributed by: Metro-Goldwyn-Mayer
- Release date: November 14, 1968
- Running time: 162 minutes
- Country: United States
- Language: English
- Budget: $6.7 million

The Shoes of the Fisherman is a 1968 American epic political drama film directed by Michael Anderson, based on Morris West’s 1963 novel about Vatican and Cold War politics. The film stars Anthony Quinn, Oskar Werner, David Janssen, Vittorio De Sica, Leo McKern, John Gielgud and Laurence Olivier.

The film was released by Metro-Goldwyn-Mayer on November 14, 1968. It received mixed reviews, but received Oscar nominations for Best Original Score and Best Production Design. Composer Alex North won a Golden Globe for his score, and the film was nominated for Best Motion Picture Drama.

== Plot ==
During the height of the Cold War, Kiril Pavlovich Lakota, the Metropolitan Archbishop of Lviv, Soviet Union, is unexpectedly set free after 20 years in a Siberian labour camp by his former jailer Piotr Ilyich Kamenev, now the Premier of the Soviet Union. He is sent to Rome, where the pope makes him a cardinal, assigned titulus of the Church of St. Athanasius. Lakota is reluctant, begging to be given "a simple mission with simple men", but the pope insists that he kneel and receive the scarlet zucchetto that designates the rank of cardinal.

When the pontiff suddenly collapses and dies, the process of a papal conclave begins, and Cardinal Lakota participates as one of the electors. During the sede vacante, two cardinals in particular, Cardinal Leone and Cardinal Rinaldi, are shown to be the leading papabili (candidates). After seven deadlocked ballots, Lakota is unexpectedly elected Pope as a compromise candidate (suggested by Cardinal Rinaldi) by spontaneous acclamation in the Sistine Chapel by the College of Cardinals, many of whom have spoken with him and been impressed by his ideas and his humility. Lakota reluctantly accepts election and takes the name of Pope Kiril. Meanwhile, the world is on the brink of nuclear war due to a Chinese–Soviet feud made worse by a famine caused by widespread crop failures in China.

The evening after his election, Pope Kiril, with the help of his valet Gelasio, sneaks out of the Vatican and explores the city of Rome dressed as a simple priest. By chance, he encounters Dr. Ruth Faber, who is in a troubled marriage with Rome-based television journalist George Faber. Kiril helps get her medicine from a pharmacist to help a dying Jewish patient of hers. He says a Catholic prayer over the dying man, upon which the man's friends say he is Jewish; Kiril then says a Jewish prayer, along with the man's friends, and says he learned it from a rabbi in the labor camp.

A major secondary plot in the film is the Pope's relationship with controversial theologian, philosopher and scientist Father Telemond (who resembles real-life priest Teilhard de Chardin). The Pope becomes Telemond's close personal friend, but to his deep regret, in his official capacity, he must allow the Holy Office to censure Telemond for his heterodox views. Nevertheless, the two remain friends and Telemond becomes the Pope's most trusted advisor. To the Pope's deep grief, Father Telemond dies from a neurological malady, shortly after giving the former some much needed support.

Later, the Pope returns to the Soviet Union, dressed in civilian clothing, to meet privately with Kamenev and Chinese Chairman Peng to discuss the ongoing crisis. Pope Kiril realises that if the troubles in China continue, the cost could be a war that could rip the world apart. At his papal coronation, Kiril removes his papal tiara and pledges to sell the church's property to help the Chinese, much to the delight of the crowds in St. Peter's Square below. This revolutionary action brings the world a new chance at peace and Kiril's decision is internationally acclaimed.

== Cast ==
- Anthony Quinn as Cardinal Kiril Pavlovich Lakota, later Pope Kiril
- Laurence Olivier as Piotr Ilyich Kamenev
- Oskar Werner as Fr. David Telemond
- David Janssen as George Faber
- Vittorio De Sica as Cardinal Rinaldi
- Leo McKern as Cardinal Leone
- John Gielgud as The Elder Pope
- Barbara Jefford as Dr. Ruth Faber
- Rosemary Dexter as Chiara
- Frank Finlay as Igor Bounin
- Burt Kwouk as Chairman Peng
- Arnoldo Foà as Gelasio
- Paul Rogers as Augustinian Prelate
- George Pravda as Gorshenin
- Clive Revill as Vucovich
- Niall MacGinnis as Capuchin Monk
- Marne Maitland as Cardinal Rahamani
- Isa Miranda as the Marchesa
- Gerald Harper as Brian
- Leopoldo Trieste as Dying Man's Friend
- Peter Copley as English Cardinal
- Arthur Howard as English Cardinal
- Jean Rougeul as Dominican

== Production ==
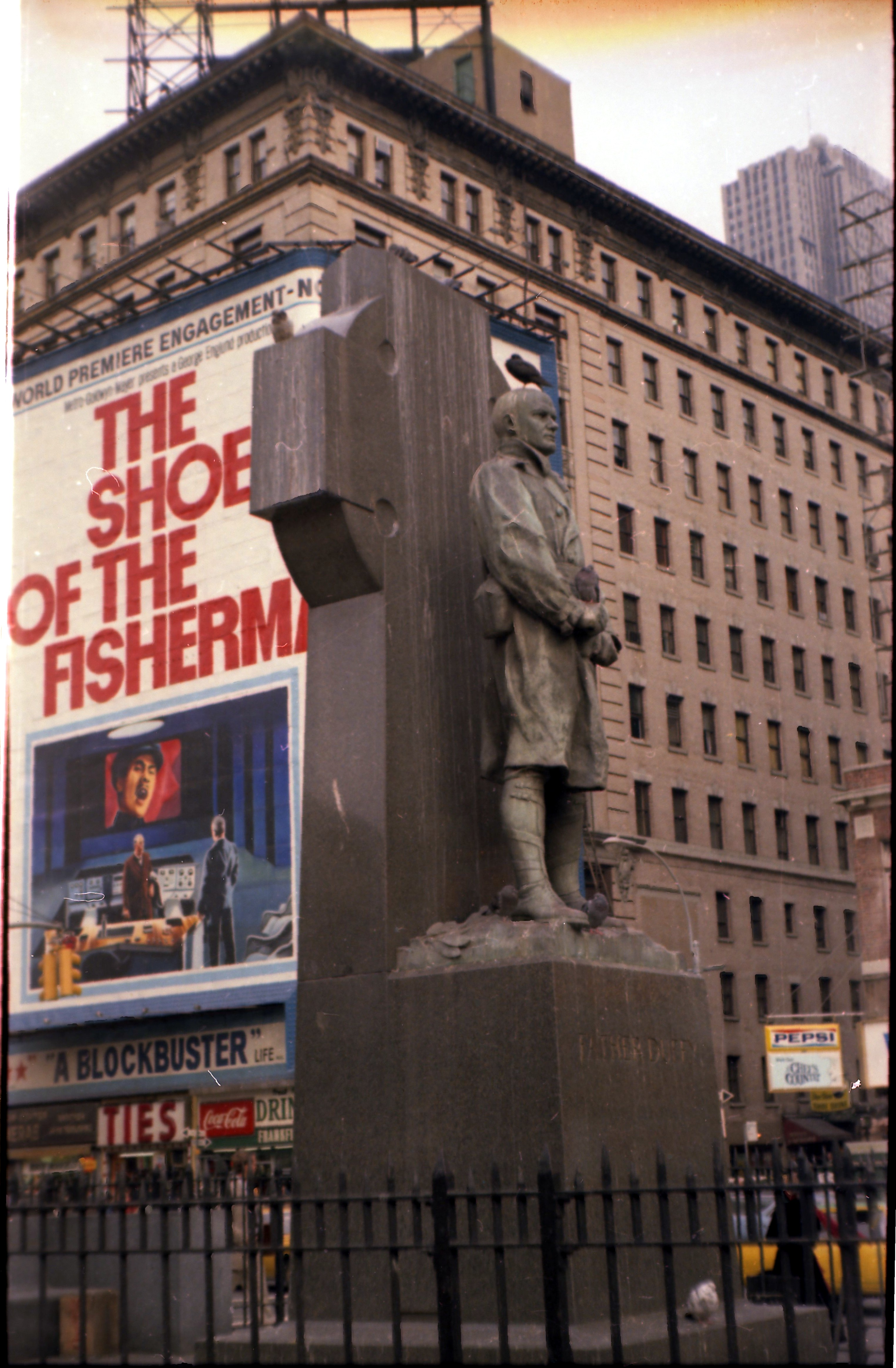
Advertisement in Duffy Square, New York City

Metro-Goldwyn-Mayer purchased the film rights in 1964 and the production was assigned to George Englund who was to write the screenplay with Morris West. (Englund was also making Dark of the Sun for the studio.)

Anthony Quinn was announced as the star of the film relatively early. The original director was to be British director Anthony Asquith, but he became ill in November 1967 (and eventually died a few months later) and was replaced by Michael Anderson.

Englund asked for technical advice from the Vatican but received no permission to film there, so places like the Sistine Chapel had to be recreated.

The papal tiara used for the coronation scene in the film is modeled after Pope Paul VI's papal tiara.

The ending of the film was changed from the book. Morris West said:

Structurally speaking I've always thought The Shoes of the Fisherman was one of my weaker books. It wanders too much. The script for the film is tighter, more direct and I think it says in a stronger way part of what I wanted to say in the novel. We've come to a point in history where men – black or white, Marxist or capitalist, Christian or non Christian – are going to have to make a choice. They're either going to have to commit themselves to an act of love for each other or an act of hate for each other. Men on each side have to say: "Look we're all brothers. Why do we kill each other in the streets? Don't let's drop the atomic bomb. Let's talk for one hour more." Today this is the real triumph of good over evil. It's what I've tried to put into the last speech for the film.

Morris West said he spent months working on a scene where Telemond was questioned by the Inquisition. He says eventually the scene worked "but only because I raised hell after finding that it had been altered by the actors with the consent of the director. I argued that it destroyed the theological validity of the plot in violation of contractual obligations between the studio and me." West says that "By the end of the film the accumulation of the variations was such that I took my name off the script." This made him reluctant to sell "anything other than a thriller or a very simple story to the movies again" because of the way Hollywood "tends to distort the underlying philosophy and theology of anything that can't easily be shaped for the screen."

== Reception ==
The film was the sixth most popular movie at the Australian box office in 1969. It was still a notable box-office disappointment. The escalating production costs of this film, along with Ice Station Zebra at the same time, led to the transfer of MGM President Robert O'Brien to chairman of the board, but he resigned this position in early 1969 after both films were released and failed to recoup their costs.

Alex North was nominated for an Academy Award for Best Score and George Davis and Edward Carfagno were nominated for Best Art Direction.

The Shoes of the Fisherman holds a 43% rating on Rotten Tomatoes based on seven reviews.
