= Gallows on the Sand =

1956 novel by Morris West

- 1963 edition
- Author: Morris West
- Language: English
- Publisher: Angus and Robertson
- Publication date: 1956
- Publication place: Australia
- Media type: Print
- Pages: 207pp
- Preceded by: -
- Followed by: Kundu

Gallows on the Sand is a 1956 novel by Morris West. It was the first novel he published under his own name. He later claimed it was written in seven days for $250 in order to pay a tax bill after he had had a nervous breakdown. West credited the book as launching his career as a novelist. However a later review of the author's career dismissed it as a "potboiler".

It was serialised for radio.

The book was re-released in 1963 as part of Angus and Robertson's Pacific Book series.

== Premise ==
Historican Renn Lundigan hunts for treasure off the Great Barrier Reef. The treasure is minted Spanish gold in a sunken galleon. Renn has to deal with islander Johnny Akimoto, gambling house owner Manny Mannix and beautiful young scientist Pat Mitchell.

== Reception ==
The Argus said "in spite of a tendency to the rather slick "Randy Stone" radio style, it is a bright, exciting yarn, guaranteed to take your mind off workaday cares. "

The Pacific Islands Monthly called it "a buried treasure trifle."

The same magazine later said it was "one of the first novels written by this world wide, best-seller author and long before he found his metier in the by-ways of Roman Catholicism," adding the book "only goes to prove how far a novelist with what it takes can travel in seven years. "

== Radio adaptation ==
The novel was serialised for radio in 1956 by West himself. It aired Monday to Thursday (beginning February 14) at 6.45 p.m.
