= The World Is Made of Glass =

Novel by Australian writer Morris West

The World is Made of Glass
- Title page for The World Is Made of Glass (1983)
- Author: Morris West
- Language: English
- Genre: Fiction
- Publisher: Hodder and Stoughton
- Publication date: 1983
- Publication place: Australia
- Media type: Print
- Pages: 315 pp.
- ISBN: 0340347104
- Preceded by: The Clowns of God
- Followed by: Cassidy

The World is Made of Glass (1983) is a novel by Australian writer Morris West. It was originally published by Hodder and Stoughton in England in 1983.

== Synopsis ==
In 1913, Carl Jung is in conversation with one of his patients, Magda von Gamsfeld. Both are moving towards mental breakdowns, and their downward slide is contrasted against the movement towards war in Europe at that time.

== Critical reception ==
Maurice Dunlevy, in The Canberra Times observed: "West's strength has always been his narrative skill, and it hasn't deserted him. Like all of his bestsellers, this is a 'great read'. Moreover, he has divined that ordinary readers, even in this rational and secular age, are more interested in good and evil — particularly evil — than in mere right and wrong, which have increasingly become the concerns of more literary novelists."

In her literary study of West and his work, Maryanne Confoy noted that West based this novel on "an incomplete case study from Jung's Memories, Dreams, Reflections." She went on: "The World is Made of Glass is constructed around two narratives, that of Magda and that of Jung...In working with Jung and Magda, West was able to engage in a battle of wits and souls. Madga's recurrent nightmare also needed to be worked on. The two characters are plagued by, rather than attracted by, the search for truth and integrity...These fictional conflicts enabled West to work through some of his own hidden guilt issues. The struggle with the doppelganger once again surfaced through this novel."

== Publication history ==
After its original publication in 1983 in England by publishers Hodder and Stoughton the novel was later published as follows:

- William Morrow, USA, 1983
- Bolinda, Australia, 2000

and many other paperback editions.

The novel was translated into Spanish in 1983.

== Play version ==
The work was adapted into a play performed in 1984.

== Notes ==
- Dedication: For JOY, with love, to celebrate a homecoming.
- Epigraph: Passages from Ralph Waldo Emerson's 'Compensation' and Anthony Storr's study of Carl Jung.
- West talked about the concepts of "illusion and deception" in the novel in a talk given in Canberra in 1983.

== See also ==
- 1983 in Australian literature
