= Moon in My Pocket =

Morris West first novel (1945)

- First edition
- Author: Morris West as "Julian Morris"
- Language: English
- Publisher: Australasian Publishing Co.
- Publication date: 1945
- Publication place: Australia
- Media type: Print
- Pages: 293

Moon in My Pocket is a 1945 novel by Morris West under the name "Julian Morris". It was West's first novel and was written while he was in the services.

The Sydney Morning Herald later wrote " The main interest of this, slight if sincere book... is West's reliance on two elements that were to become central to his writing: moral crusading and the use of real-life situations."

It was published by the Australasian Publishing Company, a branch of Harrap's Publishing Company in London, and sold more than ten thousand copies.

== Premise ==
A boy attends a seminary.
