= Vladek Sheybal =

Polish actor (1923–1992)

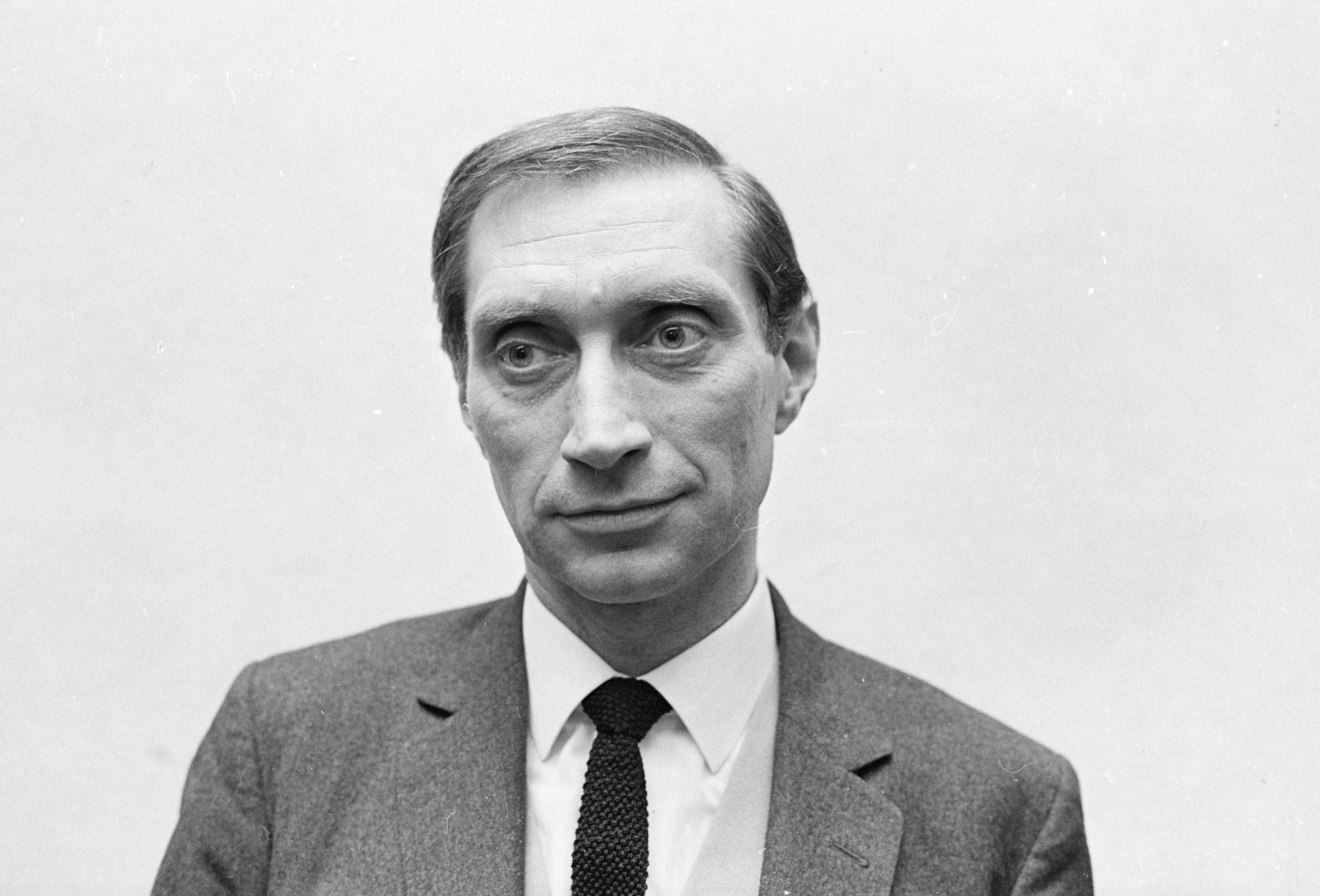
- Sheybal in 1965
- Born: Władysław Rudolf Zbigniew Sheybal; 12 March 1923; Zgierz, Poland
- Died: 16 October 1992 (aged 69); London, England
- Resting place: Putney Vale Cemetery, London
- Citizenship: Polish; British
- Education: Merton College, Oxford
- Occupations: Actor; singer
- Years active: 1957–1992
- Website: vladeksheybal.com

Vladek Sheybal (born Władysław Rudolf Zbigniew Sheybal; 12 March 1923 – 16 October 1992) was a Polish and British character actor, singer and director of both television and stage productions. He was well known for his portrayal of the chess grandmaster Kronsteen in the James Bond film From Russia with Love (1963), a role for which he had been personally recommended by his friend Sean Connery, and as Otto Leipzig in Smiley's People (1982). He also had notable recurring roles as Dr. Douglas Jackson in Gerry Anderson's UFO, Captain Ferreira in the NBC miniseries Shōgun, and Gen. Bratchenko in the 1984 version of Red Dawn.

He became a naturalised British citizen, but remained "fiercely proud of his homeland and its culture".

== Life and career ==
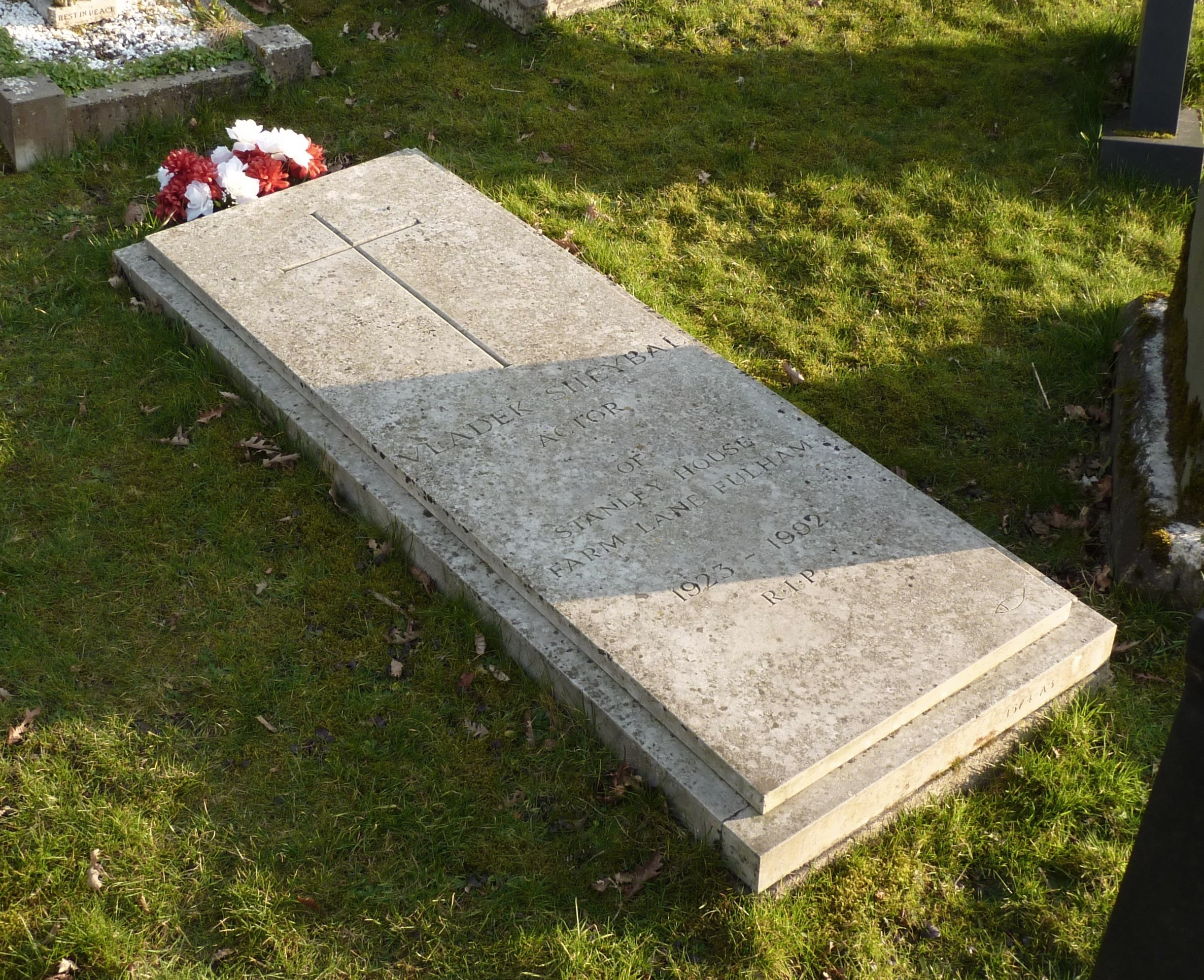
Sheybal's grave at Putney Vale Cemetery, London, in 2015

Sheybal was born in Zgierz, near Łódź, in the Second Polish Republic. The son of a university professor, he was attracted to acting at an early age. At the age of 16, he was imprisoned in a Nazi concentration camp during the occupation of Poland; escaping twice only to be recaptured and subjected to torture as punishment. After World War II ended, he began performing in Polish theatres and cinemas, earning a reputation as a skilled actor. He appeared in the film Kanał (1957, credited as Władysław Sheybal), directed by Andrzej Wajda, before departing for Paris and then Vienna in 1958 owing to his political opposition to the Communist Party.

Having difficulty finding work, he emigrated to Britain in 1959 where his reputation from Polish films lent him enough credibility to support himself teaching acting. He was soon appearing on the London stage, and was hired as the director of the Bromley Little Theatre in 1960. That same year, he directed a production of Modest Mussorgsky's Khovanshchina at Oxford University. This production was seen by executives of the BBC, and it led to work as a director for opera and theatre adaptations on British television in the early 1960s, including works for ITV Play of the Week in 1961 and 1962 and as well as productions for the BBC. In 1964, he had a triumphant success on the British stage as "He" in Leonid Andreyev's He Who Gets Slapped at the Hampstead Theatre.

In 1963, he made his British cinema debut playing the evil secret agent Kronsteen in the James Bond film From Russia with Love. He appeared often in villainous roles or character parts in British cinema up until his death in 1992. He also appeared as Holocaust survivor Egon Sobotnik in the television mini-series QB VII. He had a dual role as "the Director" and as Pierre Louys in Ken Russell's The Debussy Film (1965), one of Russell's composer biopics for the BBC. Other Russell films in which he appeared were Billion Dollar Brain (1967), Women in Love (1969), and The Boy Friend (1971).

His other films include Casino Royale (1967), Doppelgänger (1969), The Last Valley, Puppet on a Chain, Innocent Bystanders, The Wind and the Lion, The Lady Vanishes (1979), Fire and Sword, and Red Dawn.

Sheybal's other TV credits include Z-Cars, Danger Man, The Troubleshooters, The Saint, The Human Jungle, The Baron, The Champions, Callan, Strange Report, UFO, The New Avengers, Supernatural (1977), Lord Mountbatten: The Last Viceroy, Shōgun, Smiley's People, and The Man in Room 17.

In 1977, he won the Dracula Society's prestigious Hamilton Deane Award for his performance in the BBC play Night of the Marionettes, part of the Supernatural series, in which he played a sinister Austrian innkeeper whose life-size puppets supposedly inspired Mary Shelley's Frankenstein. Sheybal's final stage appearance was as Friedrich Nietzsche in the Pierre Bourgeade play The Eagle and the Serpent at London's Offstage Downstairs Theatre in 1988.

In years 1950–1957, he was in a relationship with actress Irena Eichlerówna. In England, Sheybal dated both men and women, but formed no long-term relationship.

He died in London in 1992, aged 69, from a ruptured aortic aneurysm. He is buried in Putney Vale Cemetery.

== Selected filmography ==
Year	Title	Role	Notes
1957	Kanał	Michał 'Ogromny'	
1963	From Russia with Love	Tov Kronsteen	
1965	Return from the Ashes	Paul	
1967	Casino Royale	Le Chiffre's Representative	
1967	Billion Dollar Brain	Dr. Eiwort	
1967	The Fearless Vampire Killers	Herbert von Krolock	Voice only
1968	To Grab the Ring	Mijnheer Smith	
1968	Deadfall	Dr. Delgado	
1968	The Limbo Line	Oleg	
1969	Mosquito Squadron	Lieutenant Shack	
1969	Doppelgänger	Psychiatrist	
1969	Women in Love	Loerke	
1970	Leo the Last	Lazslow	
1970	Puppet on a Chain	Meegeren	
1971	The Last Valley	Mathias	
1971	The Boy Friend	De Thril	
1972	Pilate and Others	Caiaphas	
1972	The Spy's Wife	Vladek	
1972	Innocent Bystanders	Aaron Kaplan	
1973	Scorpio	Zemetkin	
1974	S*P*Y*S	Borisenko	
1974	The Kiss	Portiere d'albergo	
1975	The Wind and the Lion	The Bashaw	
1976	House of Pleasure for Women	Francesco	
1976	The Sell Out	Dutchman	
1977	Gulliver's Travels	President of Blefuscu	Voice only
1979	The Lady Vanishes	Trainmaster	
1979	Avalanche Express	Zannbin	
1980	The Apple	Mr. Boogalow	
1981	Fire and Sword	Andret	
1983	The Jigsaw Man	Gen. Zorin	
1984	Where Is Parsifal?	George	
1984	Memed My Hawk	Ali	
1984	Red Dawn	General Bratchenko	
1990	Strike It Rich	Kinski	
1990	After Midnight	Hiyam El-Afi	
1992	Double X: The Name of the Game	Pawnbroker	

Sheybal as Kronsteen in From Russia with Love (1963)

== Television ==
Year	Title	Role	Notes
1961–1963	ITV Play of the Week	Various	3 episodes
1963	The Sentimental Agent	Arva	Episode: "Meet My Son, Henry"
1963	Z-Cars	Yador	Episode: "Daylight Robbery"
1964	The Human Jungle	William Jones	Episode: "Wild Goose Chase"
1964	Danger Man	Tewfick	Episode: "Fish on the Hook"
1965	The Troubleshooters	Herr Lenz	Episode: "The Schloss Belt"
1966	The Baron	Frederick Reiner	Episode: "And Suddenly You're Dead"
1966	The Saint	Nikita Roskin	Episode: "The Helpful Pirate"
1966	Theatre 625	Narrator	Episode: "Amerika"
1968	The Champions	Max Kellor	Episode: "The Dark Island"
1969	Callan	Dicer	Episode: "The Little Bits and Pieces of Love"
1969	Strange Report	Kulik	Episode: "REPORT 7931 SNIPER 'When is your cousin not?'"
1970	Omnibus	Joseph Goebbels	Episode: "Dance of the Seven Veils"
1970	Play for Today	Hans Weider	Episode: "A Distant Thunder"
1970–1971	UFO	Dr. Doug Jackson	10 episodes
1972	The Protectors	Sandor Karleon	Episode: "Brother Hood"
1974	BBC Play of the Month	Mr. Miller	Episode: "The Deep Blue Sea"
1974	Napoleon and Love	Prince Poniatowski	Episode: "Maria Walewska"
1974	QB VII	Sobotnik	Miniseries
1974	No, Honestly	Giovanni	Episode: "Only Make Believe"
1975	Rogue's Rock	Boris Lubchenko	5 episodes
1976	The New Avengers	Zacardi	Episode: "Cat Among the Pigeons"
1977	Supernatural	Herr Hubert	Episode: "Night of the Marionettes"
1980	Shōgun	Captain Ferriera	Miniseries
1982	Smiley's People	Otto Leipzig	Miniseries
1983	Marco Polo	Prosecuting Reverend	Episode 8
1989	Champagne Charlie	Count Plasky	TV film
1992	The Bill	Mr. Lederman	Episode: "Sympathy for the Devil"
