= The Ringmaster (novel) =

Novel by Australian writer Morris West

- Author: Morris West
- Language: English
- Genre: Fiction
- Publisher: Heinemann
- Publication date: 1991
- Publication place: Australia
- Media type: Print
- Pages: 309 pp.
- ISBN: 0434858986
- Preceded by: Lazarus
- Followed by: The Lovers

The Ringmaster (1991) is a novel by Australian writer Morris West. It was originally published by Heinemann in England in 1991.

== Synopsis ==
The novel is set in 1990 after the invasion of Kuwait by Iraq but before the onset of the first Gulf War. It is a tale of intrigue and moral dilemmas set against the backdrop of the impending economic and political collapse of the Soviet Union. An Australian, Gil Langton, is called upon to mediate talks in Bangkok between Germany and Japan who are attempting to take over the complete infrastructure of the Soviet Union to prevent starvation and a mass exodus of the Russian people into Western Europe.

== Critical reception ==
Colin Steele, writing in The Canberra Times observed: "The involvement of both international criminal and intelligence elements remind us of the seamier but omnipresent side of multinational politics. West's understandings of various national cultures are clearly but evocatively depicted. The denouement in Bangkok blends a realistic solution with longer-term optimism, as West reaffirms that only by committed mediation through the murky world of realpolilik can progress be made. West has moved east in The Ringmaster to produce a superbly crafted novel of moral and political intrigue."

In her literary study of West and his work, Maryanne Confoy noted: "As a citizen of Australia, West was concerned to offer his ideas about the epidemic of financial and political corruption that was spreading throughout the world. Books such as Harlequin, Masterclass, and The Ringmaster enabled West to present fictionally issues that institutions and individuals face within their daily reality."

== Publication history ==
After its original publication in 1991 in England by publishers Heinemann the novel was later published as follows:

- Harper Paperbacks, USA, 1996
- Allen & Unwin, Australia, 2017

and many other paperback editions.

The novel was translated into Spanish, Portuguese and Italian in 1991; and German in 1992.

== Notes ==
- Dedication: "For PHYL with gratitude and affection"
- Epigraph: "Circus. A place where horses, ponies and elephants are permitted to see men, women and children acting the fool." The Devil's Dictionary, Ambrose Bierce (1881-1911)
- "In an interview for the Spanish magazine Revista Cosas on his prediction in The Ringmaster, West responded:' Everything predicted in The Ringmaster has either come to pass, or is still a threatening possibility—famine, civil disorder, ethnic rivalries, all the accumulated pressures of pre- and post-revolutionary history.'"

== See also ==
- 1991 in Australian literature
