= The Clowns of God =

Novel by Australian writer Morris West

- Author: Morris West
- Language: English
- Genre: Fiction
- Publisher: Hodder and Stoughton
- Publication date: 1981
- Publication place: Australia
- Media type: Print
- Pages: 400 pp.
- ISBN: 0340265124
- Preceded by: Proteus
- Followed by: The World Is Made of Glass

The Clowns of God (1981) is a novel by Australian writer Morris West. It was originally published by Hodder and Stoughton in England in 1981.

This is the second book in West's "Vatican trilogy", following The Shoes of the Fisherman and preceding Lazarus.

== Synopsis ==
In the last decade of the twentieth-century, Jean Marie Barrette (Pope Gregory XVII) claims to have had a private revelation about the end of the world. In order to prevent him revealing this, the Curia tells him to either resign or be declared insane.

== Critical reception ==
Helen Brown in The Canberra Times noted: "There is plenty of action and suspense, but towards the end the theological debate becomes a little repetitious. The questions are posed again and again, but the answers are forever delayed. There seems to be no way out."

In her literary study of West and his work, Maryanne Confoy noted: "In this, as in several West's novels, we are confronted with a single character who has the task of challenging the world. The compassionate but enigmatic papal figure who struggled with the oppressive institution, Kiril of The Shoes of the Fisherman, is offset in The Clowns of God by the charismatic figure of Jean Marie called to battle on behalf of the good, with no weapon but the strength of his own belief in his prophetic vision. This is West's depiction of the call to conversion–twentieth-century style."

== Publication history ==
After its original publication in 1981 in the UK by publishers Hodder and Stoughton the novel was later published as follows:

- William Morrow, USA, 1981
- Allen & Unwin, Australia, 2017

and many other paperback editions.

The novel was translated into: Portuguese, German, Italian, French, Spanish and Norwegian in 1981; Dutch and Swedish in 1982; Turkish in 1983; Korean in 1984; and Greek in 1998.

== Notes ==
- Dedication: For my loved ones with my heart's thanks.
- Epigraph: "Who knows but the world may end tonight?" / Robert Browning "The Last Ride Together"
- Maryanne Confoy notes that the original title for this novel was The Millenium Man. This was changed after West had suffered a major health scare when he collapsed with a severe bleeding ulcer. She quotes him as writing: "I realised the human race is like a clown, going from a sense of being ridiculous to a sense of being precious. We're all God's clowns."
- West discusses the novel, its creation and its themes in a report in The Canberra Times in 1985.

== See also ==
- 1981 in Australian literature
