= Daughter of Silence =

1961 novel by Morris West

- First edition
- Author: Morris West
- Language: English
- Genre: Crime fiction
- Publisher: Heinemann
- Publication date: 1961
- Publication place: Australia
- Media type: Print
- Pages: 274 pp
- Preceded by: The Devil's Advocate
- Followed by: The Shoes of the Fisherman

Daughter of Silence (1961) is a crime novel by Australian author Morris West.

The book was a best seller in Australia and was adapted into a play.

== Plot outline ==
In mid-summer in a Tuscan village a twenty-four-year-old woman shoots the town's mayor dead in revenge for the death of her mother during the war. The subsequent trial brings out secrets both personal and political.

The woman's case is taken up by the son-in-law of Italy’s most famous advocate, whose house guest is an Australian psychiatrist. The Mayor had been a partisan leader in the war who desired the mother. The mother refused the Mayor so he had her arrested on fake charges of collaboration, raped her and had her shot. The girl was eight years old at the time and plotted revenge.

== History ==
The story was originally conceived as a short radio play and was based on an actual incident in postwar Italy. As part of his research West corresponded for months with Julius Stone.

The author called the book "the reverse side of the medal" as expressed in his novel The Devil's Advocate: "man isolating himself by egotism, and finding that his dignity and salvation can only be established on a recognition of his dependence and his need for absolution from his follies.”

== Critical reception ==
Joyce Halstead in The Australian Women's Weekly was impressed with the work: "Excellent writing in an attractive novel which uses all the gimmicks for modern reader success - an Italian setting, a court scene with a beautiful young woman on trial for murder, and intricately woven love affairs...The whole resolves itself fairly expectedly and tritely - but the intellectual arguments, convincing dialogue, emotional undertones, and competently wrought plot make it a very satisfying story."

The Age said "its plot is contrived and its style commonplace."

The Australian Jewish News called it "a connived, repetitive and wholly superficial story, moving puppets across a cardboard stage, mouthing platitudes."

The Bulletin wrote "The recipe is an old and familiar one. Take a dramatic incident, sketch in a lot of characters led by a highly romantic, appealing old man, every four of five pages lard well with serious thoughts about God, sex, man, marriage, responsibility, selfishness or anything else that’s likely to appeal to the Book Club girls; bind together with pseudo-sophistication and you have it... there is a great deal of psychiatric talk of a depth and profundity scarcely likely to induce a trauma in the most tender mind."

== Stage play ==
Daughter of Silence
- Original language: English
- Written by: Morris West
- Based on: Daughter of Silence by Morris West
- Genre: drama
- Setting: Siena, Italy

Premiere
- Date: November 30, 1961
- Place: Music Box Theatre, New York
- Directed by: Vincent J. Donehue

Daughter of Silence was adapted as a Broadway play in 1961 with Janet Margolin who received a nomination for the Tony Award for Best Featured Actress in a Play.

West's earlier novel The Devil's Advocate had been adapted into a stage play, by Dore Schary, but West elected to adapt Daughter of Silence himself. The play was produced by Richard Halliday, the husband of Marty Martin. The cast consisted of Rip Torn, Emlyn Williams and Janet Margolin.

Reviews were strong.

However the play only ran for 36 performances.

=== Other productions ===
Around twelve months later other productions of the play began. There were productions in Germany, Paris and Sydney.

The play was presented by Sydney's Independent Theatre in December 1962 directed by Peter Summerton with Richard Meikle.

The Sydney Morning Herald called the play "the stuff of worthwhile and enduring drama. Unfortunately, West has given too much time to the incidentals and lesser themes of his story."

The Bulletin felt the simple story of revenge "is cluttered up with all manner of extraneous detail, and made to run alongside the marriage failure of a rising young lawyer, who undertakes the defence of the girl." The reviewer thought there was "Too many words of exposition and description are an unfair attack on the audience’s tolerance, and the mark of a dramatic apprentice" but that it "comes to life" in the court scenes.

West addressed the audience on the second night performance to complain about the critics and praise the production.

== Proposed TV adaptation ==
In 1976 West mentioned he was adapting the novel for television.

In 1984 it was announced a six hour mini series based on the novel had been written and going to be made through Melaleuka Productions, a company formed to make adaptations of Wests' works. However as of 2025 no mini series has been made.

== See also ==
- 1961 in Australian literature

== Notes ==
- Dedication: For Hilda
- Epigraph: Alta vendetta d'alto silenzio e figlia/ Noble vengeance is the daughter of deep silence./ (Alfieri: La Congiura de' Pazzi, Act 1. Sc. 1.)
