= Vanishing Point (West novel) =

Novel by Australian writer Morris West

- Author: Morris West
- Language: English
- Genre: Fiction
- Publisher: HarperCollins
- Publication date: 1996
- Publication place: Australia
- Media type: Print
- Pages: 261 pp.
- ISBN: 0002255472
- Preceded by: The Lovers
- Followed by: Eminence

Vanishing Point (1996) is a novel by Australian writer Morris West. It was originally published by HarperCollins in England in 1993.

== Synopsis ==
When the son-in-law of New York banker Emil Strassberger goes missing after completing a major financial coup for the bank, Strassberger seeks out his son Carl, an artist who has turned his back on the banking world, to find out what has happened.

== Critical reception ==
A reviewer in The Australian Jewish News was not impressed with the book: "I have read all of Morris West’s novels and his combination of sheer readability with a respect for the English language mark him as a born storyteller who is never facile or superficial. But I have to say that Vanishing Point is not one of his better books. It's flawed because it doesn’t deliver the tense finale that the greater part of the plot leads one to expect."

In her literary study of West and his work, Maryanne Confoy noted: "The primary way in which West chose to say sorry was through his novels. Vanishing Point was his late adulthood novel in which he explored manic depression from a perspective of compassionate understanding for all involved. It appears thsat he made a concrete effort to acknowledge through this novel the limits and liabilites he faced in his own depression, and to express his concern for the depression that his son Chris had been struggling with all his life."

== Publication history ==
After its original publication in 1996 in England by publishers HarperCollins the novel was later published as follows:

- HarperCollins, USA, 1996
- Allen & Unwin, Australia, 2017

and many other paperback editions.

The novel was translated into Spanish, French, Portuguese in 1996; Hebrew in 1997; Italian in 1998; Polish in 1999; and German in 2000.

== Notes ==
- Dedication: "For my family, who, like all travelers, have heard the storm winds rise and learned the perils of strange shores. This book—with love."
- Epigraph: "Our interest's on the dangerous edge of things." — Robert Browning, "Bishop Blougram's Apology"

== See also ==
- 1996 in Australian literature
