= The Devil's Advocate (1977 film) =

- Directed by: Guy Green
- Written by: Morris West, based on his novel The Devil's Advocate
- Produced by: Lutz Hengst, Helmut Jedele
- Starring: John Mills; Paola Pitagora; Stéphane Audran; Jason Miller; Leigh Lawson; Daniel Massey; Raf Vallone; Patrick Mower; Timothy West
- Cinematography: Billy Williams
- Music by: Bert Grund
- Release date: 27 October 1977
- Running time: 104 minutes
- Country: West Germany
- Language: English
- Budget: $3 million

The Devil's Advocate, originally released as Des Teufels Advokat, is a 1977 West German English-language drama film, directed by Guy Green (his final theatrical film) and based on the 1959 novel of the same name by the Australian writer Morris West.

It stars John Mills, Paola Pitagora, Stéphane Audran, Leigh Lawson, Jason Miller and Daniel Massey. The film is set in Italy but was filmed predominantly in Bavaria.

== Plot ==
In 1958, the Catholic Church is investigating the case of a mysterious individual, Giacomo Nerone (Leigh Lawson), who is said to have performed miracles in a remote village in Southern Italy (Scontrone), before being executed by Italian Communist partisans in 1944. The process involves a "Devil's advocate", who is tasked with discovering any details about the subject's life which would indicate that canonisation would be inappropriate.

Monsignor Blaise Meredith (John Mills) is given this responsibility, shortly after he learns he has terminal cancer. Meredith discovers that Nerone was actually a British soldier named James Black, who had become detached from the British Army during World War II and was hiding in this village, where he began a relationship with a local woman.

The film touches on homosexuality, priests cohabiting, the Italian Holocaust, and other sensitive topics.

== Cast ==
- John Mills as Monsignor Blaise Meredith
- Stéphane Audran as Anne, Contessa di Sanctis
- Jason Miller as Dr Aldo Meyer
- Paola Pitagora as Nina Sanduzzi
- Leigh Lawson as James Black aka Giacomo Nerone
- Timothy West as Father Anselmo
- Patrick Mower as Il Lupo
- Raf Vallone as Bishop Aurelio
- Daniel Massey as Nicholas Black
- Romolo Valli as Cardinal Marotta

== Production ==
Morris West wrote the screenplay from his novel of the same name. In January 1976 J. Lee Thompson was announced as director. Guy Green said it had the "possibility of being a great film" but "there was a fly in the ointment by the name of Morris West."
