= Eminence (novel) =

Novel by Australian writer Morris West

- Author: Morris West
- Language: English
- Genre: Fiction
- Publisher: HarperCollins
- Publication date: 1998
- Publication place: Australia
- Media type: Print
- Pages: 296 pp.
- ISBN: 0732267048
- Preceded by: Vanishing Point
- Followed by: The Last Confession

Eminence (1998) is a novel by Australian writer Morris West. It was originally published by HarperCollins in Australia in 1998.

== Synopsis ==
As a young man, Cardinal Luca Rossini was tortured in an Argentine military prison. He was nursed back to health by Isabel, wife of an Argentine diplomat, with whom he has an affair and a child. After his recovery, he is sent to Rome to work in the Vatican. Over time he becomes the confidante of the reigning Pope. When that Pope falls ill and it becomes apparent that he must be replaced, Rossini takes a leading role in the process. While this is going on, Isabel and her daughter arrive in Rome, and Rossini must confront both his past and his future.

== Critical reception ==
Pamela Ruskin, in The Australian Jewish News wrote of the novel: "West gives us a picture, obviously of Pope John Paul II, of a sick, cantankerous, stubborn, rigidly conservative man who should have been retired long before. Perhaps over emotional and at times sentimental, this is a fine and thought-provoking novel by a writer consistently underrated by the literary critics for the unforgivable sin of being a bestseller."

In her literary study of West and his work, Maryanne Confoy noted: "...Eminence, is another moral exploration of the misuse of power in church politics... A central dilemma of the book is what happens when a Pope is rendered incapacitated and what might happen to the Church and the Magisterium in such an impasse."

== Publication history ==
After its original publication in 1998 in Australia by publishers HarperCollins the novel was later published as follows:

- Harcourt Brace, USA, 1998
- Harvill Press, UK, 1998
- Allen & Unwin, Australia, 2017

and many other paperback editions.

The novel was translated into Italian, French, Portuguese, German and Spanish in 1998; and Slovakian in 1999.

== See also ==
- 1998 in Australian literature

== Notes ==
- Dedication: "For Carol and David Ashley-Wilson, good companions, friends of the heart."
- Epigraph:
  - "The Church in Argentina, and we its members, have many reasons to confess our sins and to beg pardon of God and society: for our insensitivity, for our cowardice, for our omissions, for our complicities in respect of illegal repression." — Monsignor Jorce Novak, Bishop of Quilmes, Argentina. Quoted in Politica, 29 April 1995
  - "Where law ends, tyranny begins." — William Pitt, Speech, 9 January 1770
