= Devil's Chaplain =

Devil's Chaplain may refer to:

- A Devil's Chaplain, a 2003 book of writings by Richard Dawkins
- George Harris (Unitarian) (1794–1859), British Unitarian minister
- Robert Taylor (Radical) (1784–1844), British Radical
- The Devil's Chaplain, a 1929 film featuring Boris Karlof
- The Devil's Chaplain, a 1922 book by George Bronson Howard

== See also ==
- Devil's advocate (disambiguation)
