= Harlequin (West novel) =

Novel by Australian writer Morris West

- Author: Morris West
- Language: English
- Genre: Fiction
- Publisher: Collins
- Publication date: 1974
- Publication place: Australia
- Media type: Print
- Pages: 285 pp.
- ISBN: 0002213311
- Preceded by: The Salamander
- Followed by: The Navigator

Harlequin is a novel by Australian writer Morris West. It was originally published by Collins in England in 1974.

== Synopsis ==
George Harlequin is the head of a prestigious Swiss bank. Then his bank is identified as the target of a hostile takeover by Basil Yanko, the CEO of a computer security company who uses the company's skills and expertise to set up other companies for attack.

== Critical reception ==
Jonathan Dawson, writing in The Canberra Times, noted that "Harlequin is a thriller and a very fine one, certainly one of West's best works to date. It strikes deep into the heart of the capitalist system, the world of paper money that is now seen to be no longer impregnable."

In her literary study of West and his work, Maryanne Confoy noted: "In Harlequin, written when he was in his late fifties, West once again investigated the theme of the divided self and he developed it in greater depth. But this time it was against the panorama of the battle between good and evil that is integral to the human condition. West was still struggling with the moral universe in order to find personal peace."

== Publication history ==
After its original publication in 1974 in England by publishers Collins the novel was later published as follows:

- William Morrow, USA, 1974
- Pocket Books, USA, 1975
- Allen & Unwin, Australia, 2017

and many other paperback editions.

The novel was also translated into Dutch, Danish and Norwegian in 1974, and German in 1978.

== Notes ==
- Dedication: "For Sheila"
- Epigraph:

As if we were villains by necessity;
fools by heavenly compulsion.
Shakespeare, King Lear, Act 1, Sc. 2

== See also ==
- 1974 in Australian literature
