= The Lovers (West novel) =

Novel by Australian writer Morris West

- Title page for The Lovers (1993)
- Author: Morris West
- Language: English
- Genre: Fiction
- Publisher: Heinemann
- Publication date: 1993
- Publication place: Australia
- Media type: Print
- Pages: 314 pp.
- ISBN: 0855615052
- Preceded by: The Ringmaster
- Followed by: Vanishing Point

The Lovers (1993) is a novel by Australian writer Morris West. It was originally published by Heinemann in England in 1993.

== Synopsis ==
Bryan de Courcy Cavanagh is an Australian of Irish descent who joins the crew of the yacht Salamandra D'oro, as navigator and pseudo-first officer. The yacht is owned by American millionaire Lou Molloy, who is travelling with his fiancée Giulia Farnese and her father. Cavanagh has an affair with Giulia but it is destined to go nowhere as she is determined to marry Molloy to please her father. Forty years later, back home in Australia, Cavanagh receives a message from Giulia telling him that Molloy is dead and that she needs his help with a legal matter.

== Critical reception ==
Leonard Ward, writing in The Canberra Times, observed: "It is hardly necessary to state that he is one of Australia's most distinguished and successful writers. His prose is elegant and sometimes downright lyrical and his plots always logical and usually a credible reflection of some facet of the human predicament." After outlining the story Ward noted that it all might sound rather melodramatic, but West is such a superb story-teller, such a master of the language, that the credibility of the tale is maintained from start to finish."

In her literary study of West and his work, Maryanne Confoy noted: "In The Lovers, West chose to revisit all the places he had enjoyed in his first love affair with Europe...His travels enabled him to find a home where his inner world of romantic fantasy could connect with his intellectual love of history and take concrete shape in his novels. The Lovers' was in many ways the ultimate celebration of this aspect of West's identity and of his social transformation."

== Publication history ==
After its original publication in 1993 in England by publishers Heinemann the novel was later published as follows:

- D. I. Fine, USA, 1993
- Allen & Unwin, Australia, 2017

and many other paperback editions.

The novel was translated into Greek, Italian, Spanish, Portuguese in 1993; French and Bulgarian in 1994; Norwegian in 1995; German in 1996; and Vietnamese in 2002.

== See also ==
- 1993 in Australian literature

== Notes ==
- Dedication: "For Joy, companion of so many voyages Earth-mother to a scattered family, and for Finn, latest addition to the tribe, with much, much love."
- In 1993 West announced that he was retrting from writing, with his last novel to be The Lovers. However, "The five novels he wrote after his 'returement' from writing explore issues that were stil important to him."
