= Leigh Lawson =

English actor, director and writer (born 1945)

- Born: 21 July 1945 (age 81); Atherstone, Warwickshire, England
- Occupations: Actor, director, writer
- Years active: 1969–present
- Spouse: Twiggy (m. 1988)
- Partner: Hayley Mills (1975–1984)
- Children: 2

Allan Leigh Lawson (born 21 July 1945) is an English actor, director and writer.

== Early life ==
Lawson was born in Atherstone, Warwickshire. He initially studied at Mountview Academy of Theatre Arts before training further at the Royal Academy of Dramatic Art.

== Career ==
Lawson has acted in film and television since the early 1970s, and has directed plays in the West End and on Broadway. He has worked with the National Theatre, Royal Shakespeare Company (RSC) and with film directors such as Roman Polanski and Franco Zeffirelli. Lawson has been quoted as saying that the only time in his career when he did not feel he should be somewhere else doing something else was when he was with the RSC. His portrayals in films include Bernardo in Brother Sun, Sister Moon (1972) and Alec d'Urberville in Tess (1979). He played the leading role as Alan Lomax in the television drama series Travelling Man (1984–85), and guest starred in television series such as The Duchess of Duke Street (1976), Disraeli (1978), Feuer und Schwert - Die Legende von Tristan und Isolde (1982), The Ray Bradbury Theatre (1988) and Silent Witness (2005–2007). Lawson also guested, with his wife Twiggy, playing themselves in an episode of the comedy series Absolutely Fabulous (2001).

In 1999 Lawson co-wrote and directed the musical If Love Were All, which tells of the friendship between Gertrude Lawrence and Noël Coward. The Dream: An Actor's Story, a theatrical memoir about the day-to-day life of a working actor, was published in September 2009. Leigh's first poetry collection, Now and Then, was published in 2025.

== Personal life ==
In 1976, Lawson and his first wife, Mondy, were divorced. He met the actress Hayley Mills in 1975, when they performed in London's West End in A Touch of Spring; the following year, they had a son. Lawson was stepfather to Crispian Mills, Mills's son with director Roy Boulting. During that time, he appeared with Mills's father, John Mills, in the film The Devil's Advocate (1977). Lawson and Mills ended their relationship in the mid-1980s.

Lawson met the model Twiggy in 1984. In 1988, they both worked in the film Madame Sousatzka and were married on 23 September that year, in Tony Walton's back yard in Sag Harbor, Long Island. The couple reside in West London and also own a home in Southwold, Suffolk.

He adopted Twiggy's daughter, Carly, who took his surname.

== Partial filmography ==
- Brother Sun, Sister Moon (1972) - Bernardo
- Ghost Story (1974) - Robert
- QB VII (1974, TV mini-series) - Dix
- Percy's Progress (1974) - Percy Edward Anthony
- The God King (1974) - Kassapa
- Love Among the Ruins (1975, TV movie) - Alfred Pratt
- The Tiger Lily (1975) - Michael
- The Duchess of Duke Street (1976, Episode: "For Love Or Money")
- Space: 1999 (1976, Episode: "One Moment of Humanity")
- The Devil's Advocate (1977) - Giacomo Nerone
- Golden Rendezvous (1977) - Tony Cerdan
- Tess (1979) - Alec Stokes-d'Urberville
- Why Didn't They Ask Evans? (1980, TV movie) - Roger Bassington-ffrench
- Hammer House of Horror (1980, Episode: "Charlie Boy") - Graham
- Fire and Sword (1982) - Mark
- Lace (1984, TV mini-series) - Count Charles de Chazalle
- Hammer House of Mystery and Suspense (1984, Episode: "Black Carrion") - Paul Taylor
- Sword of the Valiant: The Legend of Sir Gawain and the Green Knight (1984) - Humphrey
- Madame Sousatzka (1988) - Ronnie Blum
- Kinsey (TV series) (1991) - Neil Kinsey
- Out of Depth (2000) - Tate
- Back to the Secret Garden (2000) - Sir Colin Craven
- Being Julia (2004) - Archie Dexter
- Casanova (2005) - Mother's Lover / Tito
- Silence Becomes You (2005) - Father
- Silent Witness: The Meaning of Death (2005) - Nikki's Father
- The Courageous Heart of Irena Sendler (2009, TV movie) - Rabbi Rozenfeld
- The Red Tent (2014, TV mini-series) - Laban

== Stage appearances ==
- Ivan Kaliayev, The Price of Justice, Mermaid Theatre, London, (1972).
- A Touch of Spring, with Hayley Mills, Comedy Theatre, London's West End, (1975–78).
- Aubrey Tanqueray, The Second Mrs. Tanqueray, Royal National Theatre (1981).
- Louis Dubedat, The Doctor's Dilemma, Greenwich Theatre, London, 1981
- Amnon, Yonadab, directed by Peter Hall, Royal National Theatre (1985).
- Antonio, The Merchant of Venice in London's West End and on Broadway (1989).
- Oberon, A Midsummer Night's Dream, produced by Adrian Noble, Royal Shakespeare Company, (1990).
- Loveless, The Relapse, Royal Shakespeare Company, (1996).
- Marc, Art, London's West End and UK Tour, (2002).
- Lloyd, Noises Off, London's West End and on Broadway (2003).
- Death and the Maiden, King's Head Theatre, London (2004).
- Nicholas Nickleby, Chichester Festival Theatre, (2006).
- Shoreditch Madonna, with Francesca Annis, Soho Theatre, (2006).
- Messerschmann, Ring Round the Moon, Playhouse Theatre, London, (2008)

== Directed ==
- If Love Were All, (1999), opened off-Broadway at the Lucille Lortel Theatre with Twiggy as Gertrude Lawrence and Harry Groener as Noël Coward, written by Sheridan Morley & Leigh Lawson, directed by Leigh Lawson.
- The Restaurant, New York
- The Cherry Orchard, US
- Death and the Maiden, King's Head Theatre, Islington, (2004)
- Jack and the Beanstalk, Pantomime, Brighton Theatre Royal, (2005), starring Twiggy
