= The Naked Country =

- Directed by: Tim Burstall
- Screenplay by: Tim Burstall; Ross Dimsey
- Based on: novel by Morris West
- Produced by: Ross Dimsey
- Starring: John Stanton; Rebecca Gilling; Ivar Kants
- Cinematography: David Eggby
- Edited by: Tony Paterson
- Music by: Bruce Smeaton
- Distributed by: Dumbarton Films
- Release date: 1985
- Running time: 92 minutes
- Country: Australia
- Language: English
- Budget: AU$2.75 million

The Naked Country is a 1985 Australian film. It was based on the 1957 novel by Morris West.

== Cast ==
- Rebecca Gilling as Mary Dillon
- John Stanton as Lance Dillon
- Tom E. Lewis as Mundaru

== Original novel ==
The Naked Country
- Author: Morris West as "Michael East"
- Language: English
- Genre: adventure
- Publisher: Heinemann
- Publication date: 1960
- Publication place: Australia
- Media type: Print
- Pages: 202

The film was based on a novel by Australian author Morris West, writing under the name "Michael East". It was published in 1960, by which time West had established himself with an international best seller, The Devil's Advocate.

The Sydney Morning Herald said it was a "skilfully written although not particularly impressive tale of adventure and romance in the outback tradition."

=== Other adaptations ===
The novel formed the basis for "The Hunters" an episode of the TV series Whiplash (1960–61).

In 1965, screenwriter James Poe was in Sydney to research a film he was going to make for MGM and producer George Englund called The Adventures of Captain Cook. Poe said he hoped to follow this with an adaptation of The Naked Country. However the Captain Cook project was not made and a film of The Naked Country did not result until the 1980s.

== Production ==
In 1982, Ross Dimsey was finishing his contract as head of the Victoria Film Corporation and was looking for a project to do. Robert Ward of Filmways introduced him to the novel. Along with Mark Josem of Filmways and solicitor Bill Marshall they formed a company called Intronide to buy the rights to The Naked Country, which had been optioned several times but not made.

Dimsey did a treatment which focused on the affair between the police officer and the station owner's wife. He then approached Tim Burstall, with whom he had worked several times, to direct. Burstall agreed on the proviso that he helped write the script. Tim Burstall:

I was a hired gun there; I didn't choose the material. He [Morris West] wrote it in 1945 and it really was a potboiler. It had the rudiments, the beginnings of land rights issues, but I took this and converted it absolutely into a land rights thing. To me the problem was I thought the business of Stanton versus the aborigines was okay. But there were indigestible lumps in the script like the adultery. And the Ivar Kants character was too melodramatic. I had to make him a mercenary from South Africa.

The story was originally set in the Kimberley region but filming there would have been logistically impossible, so it was set in Queensland.

Ten percent of the budget was provided by the Queensland Film Corporation. The film's complete budget of $2.75 million was over subscribed by more than $1 million at the end of the 1983–84 financial year and the movie had a 30% combined foreign and Australian pre sale when production started. The movie was shot in and around Charters Towers. Dimsey later estimated that buying the rights to first day of filming took three months.

== Reception ==
The film performed poorly at the Australian box office but did better overseas, particularly in France and Germany, and Ross Dimsey says it got most of its money back. Dimsey says he regrets pulling back on the romantic plot and he felt the movie was a little old fashioned. He felt it was made under circumstances that were too rushed and the script had not been developed.

=== Home media ===
Released for the first time on DVD by Umbrella Entertainment in December 2015.

Title	Format	Episodes	Discs/Tapes	Region 4 (Australia)	Special features	Distributors
The Naked Country	DVD	Film	1	31 December 2015	Exclusive Interview with Actress Rebecca Gilling Audio Interview With Writer/Producer Ross Dimsey Stills Gallery	Umbrella Entertainment
