= Masterclass (novel) =

Novel by Australian writer Morris West

- Author: Morris West
- Language: English
- Genre: Fiction
- Publisher: Hutchinson
- Publication date: 1988
- Publication place: Australia
- Media type: Print
- Pages: 330 pp.
- ISBN: 0091736579
- Preceded by: Cassidy
- Followed by: Lazarus

Masterclass (1988) is a novel by Australian writer Morris West. It was originally published by Hutchinson in England in 1988.

== Synopsis ==
American art historian Maxwell Mather is a kept man, working as an archivist and resident lover of an Italian noblewoman. She develops Motor Neurone Disease, and, as she slowly dies, he finishes up his work on the archive. After her death he learns from her will that he can have his choice of items in the archive just as he discovers some lost Raphaels.

== Critical reception ==
Stephen Prickett in The Canberra Times observed: "Morris West knows how to tell a good story well. He also knows how to do something more: he knows how to unfold character in a way that will keep us in suspense and yet, in retrospect, feel right. Masterclass is a novel that operates at two interconnected levels. At one level it is, as the dust jacket breathlessly informs us, a story of intrigue and double-dealing in the shadowy and manipulative world of the world art market where art is an inflation-proof currency and the big institutions play for stakes that run into hundreds of millions. At another level it is an exploration of a theme that has haunted novelists ever since Tolstoy; do people ever really change? Are our characters capable of genuine development or do we simply discover more about how they are pre-programmed? Is destiny in some odd way simply an expression of what we already are?"

In her literary study of West and his work, Maryanne Confoy noted: "As a citizen of Australia, West was concerned to offer his ideas about the epidemic of financial and political corruption that was spreading throughout the world. Books such as Harlequin, Masterclass, and The Ringmaster enabled West to present fictionally issues that institutions and individuals face within their daily reality."

== Publication history ==
After its original publication in 1988 in England by publishers Hutchinson the novel was later published as follows:

- St. Martin's Press, USA, 1988
- Allen & Unwin, Australia, 2017

and many other paperback editions.

The novel was translated into Swedish, Spanish, German, and French in 1989; Greek, Portuguese in 1990; Japanese and Italian in 1992; Danish and Norwegian in 1993; and Polish in 1994.

== See also ==
- 1988 in Australian literature

== Notes ==
- Dedication: "For my new grand-daughters Siobhan and Natascha Louise."
- Epigraph:
  - "The study of the beautiful is a duel in which the artist cries out in terror before he is vanquished." Baudelaire, An Artist's Confession
  - "People always confuse the man and the artist because chance has united them in the same body." Jules Renard, Journal
