= Peter Zinner =

Austrian-American film editor (1919–2007)

- Born: July 24, 1919; Vienna, Austria
- Died: November 13, 2007 (aged 88); Santa Monica, California, U.S.
- Occupation: Film editor
- Years active: 1962–2006
- Spouse: Christa Zinner (m. 1959)
- Children: 1

Peter Zinner (July 24, 1919 – November 13, 2007) was an Austrian-American film editor. Following nearly fifteen years of uncredited work as an assistant sound editor, Zinner received credits on more than fifty films from 1959 to 2006. His most influential films are likely The Godfather and The Godfather Part II, both of which appear on a 2012 listing of the 75 best edited films of all time compiled by the Motion Picture Editors Guild.

== Early life ==
He was born in Vienna, Austria, and studied music there in the Theresianum and at the Max Reinhardt Seminar. Following the occupation of Austria by Nazi Germany in 1938, Zinner and his parents, who were Jewish, emigrated. They went first to the Philippines, and in 1940 to the United States. As a young man, Zinner worked in Los Angeles as a taxi driver and occasionally as a pianist at screenings of silent films.

== Career ==
In 1943, Zinner became an apprentice film editor at the 20th Century Fox Studios. He became an assistant sound-effects editor at Universal Studios in 1947. Much of his work as an assistant sound and music editor is uncredited; he worked with composers Miklós Rózsa, Jacques Ibert, André Previn, Adolph Deutsch, and Bernard Herrmann on films including Quo Vadis (1951), Singin' in the Rain (1952), The Band Wagon (1953), Gigi (1958), and Gene Kelly's experimental Invitation to the Dance (1956). His first credit as a music editor was for For the First Time (1959); his other credits for music include X-15 (1961), the US version of King Kong vs. Godzilla (1962), and Lord Jim (1965).

Zinner had wanted to move into film editing, and following his music-editing work with producer-director Richard Brooks on Lord Jim, Brooks asked him to edit The Professionals (1967) and In Cold Blood (1967). Zinner's work on The Professionals was nominated for an American Cinema Editors Eddie Award. By 1970 he had become sufficiently established as an editor that he was asked to edit the latter half of The Godfather; William H. Reynolds edited the first half. The film, which was directed by Francis Ford Coppola, has been very successful with critics and at the box office. One of its sequences has become an icon of film editing. As critic Tony Sloman described it in 2007, "As the newly born child of Michael Corleone is christened, the young Don Michael, heir to the almost-murdered Don Vito Corleone, wreaks his revenge on his enemies, eliminating them to the soundtrack of the priest's baby-blessing and the church's organ music. It is unquestionably one of the most dramatically satisfying and audience-shattering sequences in contemporary cinema, a magnificent example of the art of motion-picture editing, the craft of story-telling by montage. The editor of the sequence was Peter Zinner." Director Frank Pierson said, "...That's the kind of thing that he was brilliant at, and it's become a classic sequence in movie history."

Zinner was nominated for the Academy Award for Best Film Editing three times, for his work on The Godfather (1972), The Deer Hunter (1978; directed by Michael Cimino), and An Officer and a Gentleman {1982; directed by Taylor Hackford}. He won the Oscar, a BAFTA, and an Eddie for The Deer Hunter. His work (with Barry Malkin and Richard Marks) on The Godfather Part II (1974) earned a second BAFTA nomination. Zinner was nominated four times for Emmy Awards, and won for the miniseries War and Remembrance (1988) and for Citizen Cohn (1992). His peers in the American Cinema Editors honored him with six Eddie nominations of which he won four.

His many other film editing credits include Blake Edwards' Gunn, Foolin' Around, Darling Lili, Dirty Pictures, Crazy Joe, Mahogany, A Star is Born (with Barbra Streisand) and Somebody Has to Shoot the Picture.

In 1990 he played the role of an admiral in the film The Hunt for Red October. Zinner also produced four films. He directed The Salamander (1981) with Anthony Quinn.

== Personal life ==
Zinner had married his wife Christa, a German-born photographer and artist, in 1959. Their daughter, Katina Zinner, is also a film editor as well as an artist. Zinner died on November 13, 2007, aged 88, in Santa Monica, California, from non-Hodgkin lymphoma. His funeral was held on January 5, 2008.

== Filmography ==
=== Film ===
Year	Title	Editor	Producer	Other	Director	Notes
1959	For the First Time	No	No	Yes	Rudolph Maté	Music editor
1961	The Deadly Companions	No	No	Yes	Sam Peckinpah	Music editor Edited by Stanley Rabjohn
1961	X-15	No	No	Yes	Richard Donner	Music editor Edited by Stanley Rabjohn
1962	Varan the Unbelievable	Yes	No	No	Ishirō Honda	American version only
1962	King Kong vs. Godzilla	Yes	No	No	Ishirō Honda	American version only
1963	They Saved Hitler's Brain	No	No	Yes	David Bradley	Music supervisor
1964	The Naked Kiss	No	No	Yes	Samuel Fuller	Music editor
1965	Lord Jim	No	No	Yes	Richard Brooks	Music editor
1965	Deathwatch	No	No	Yes	Vic Morrow	Music editor
1966	The Professionals	Yes	No	No	Richard Brooks	Nominated- ACE Eddie Award for Best Edited Feature Film
1967	Gunn	Yes	No	No	Blake Edwards	
1967	In Cold Blood	Yes	No	No	Richard Brooks	
1969	Changes	Yes	No	No	Hall Bartlett	
1969	The Red Tent	Yes	Yes	No	Mikhail Kalatozov	Co-editor with John Shirley
1970	Darling Lili	Yes	No	No	Blake Edwards	
1972	The Godfather	Yes	No	No	Francis Ford Coppola	Co-editor with William H. Reynolds Nominated- Academy Award for Best Film Editing; Nominated- ACE Eddie Award for Best Edited Feature Film
1973	Chino	Yes	No	No	John Sturges	Co-editor with Luis Álvarez & Vanio Amici
1974	Crazy Joe	Yes	Associate	No	Carlo Lizzani	
1974	The Godfather Part II	Yes	No	No	Francis Ford Coppola	Co-editor with Barry Malkin & Richard Marks Nominated- BAFTA Award for Best Editing
1975	Mahogany	Yes	No	No	Berry Gordy	
1976	Foxtrot	Yes	No	No	Arturo Ripstein	
1976	A Star Is Born	Yes	No	No	Frank Pierson	
1978	The Deer Hunter	Yes	No	No	Michael Cimino	Academy Award for Best Film Editing; BAFTA Award for Best Editing; ACE Eddie Award for Best Edited Feature Film
1979	The Fish That Saved Pittsburgh	Yes	No	No	Gilbert Moses	Co-editor with Frank Mazzola
1980	Foolin' Around	Yes	No	No	Richard T. Heffron	
1981	The Salamander	No	No	Yes	Himself	As director
1982	An Officer and a Gentleman	Yes	No	No	Taylor Hackford	Nominated- Academy Award for Best Film Editing
1983	Running Brave	Yes	No	No	Donald Shebib	
1985	War and Love	Yes	No	No	Moshé Mizrahi	
1986	Saving Grace	Yes	No	No	Robert M. Young	
1990	The Hunt for Red October	No	No	Yes	John McTiernan	Actor; as Admiral Yuri Padorin
1990	Eternity	Yes	No	No	Steven Paul	Co-editor with Michael J. Sheridan
1991	Ted & Venus	Yes	No	No	Bud Cort	Co-editor with Katina Zinner
1992	Gladiator	Yes	No	No	Rowdy Herrington	Co-editor with Harry B. Miller III
1997	A Gun, a Car, a Blonde	Yes	Yes	No	Stefani Ames	
1997	Motel Blue	Yes	No	No	Sam Firstenberg	Co-editor with Phil Russman
1999	The Omega Code	Yes	No	No	Rob Marcearelli	Co-editor with Katina Zinner
2006	Running with Arnold	Yes	No	No	Dan Cox	Documentary film Co-editor with Rick Benavides & Katina Zinner

=== Television ===
Year	Title	Editor	Producer	Other	Director	Notes
1960-61	The Brothers Brannagan	No	No	Yes	Paul Landres	Music editor/supervisor 4 episodes
1961	Miami Undercover	No	No	Yes	Howard W. Koch	Music editor/supervisor 38 episodes
1983	The Winds of War	Yes	No	No	Dan Curtis	Miniseries; Co-editor with Bernard Gribble, John F. Burnett & Jack Tucker Primetime Emmy Award for Outstanding Editing for a Limited Series or Movie
1988-89	War and Remembrance	Yes	No	No	Dan Curtis	Miniseries; Co-editor with John F. Burnett Primetime Emmy Award for Outstanding Editing for a Limited Series or Movie; ACE Eddie Award for Best Edited Television Mini-Series
1987	Broken Vows	Yes	Yes	No	Jud Taylor	Television film
1990	Somebody Has to Shoot the Picture	Yes	No	No	Frank Pierson	Television film
1992	Citizen Cohn	Yes	No	No	Frank Pierson	Television film Primetime Emmy Award for Outstanding Editing for a Limited Series or Movie; ACE Eddie Award for Best Edited Television Special; Nominated- CableACE Award for Best Editing in a Dramatic Special
1994	The Enemy Within	Yes	No	No	Jonathan Darby	Television film
2000	American Tragedy	Yes	No	No	Lawrence Schiller	Television film
2000	Dirty Pictures	Yes	No	No	Frank Pierson	Television film ACE Eddie Award for Best Edited Motion Picture for Non-Commercial Television
2001	Conspiracy	Yes	Yes	No	Frank Pierson	Television film Nominated- Primetime Emmy Award for Outstanding Television Movie; Nominated- Primetime Emmy Award for Outstanding Editing for a Limited Series or Movie
2002	10,000 Black Men Named George	Yes	No	No	Robert Townsend	Television film Co-editor with Katina Zinner

== Awards and nominations ==
Year	Association	Category	Work	Result
1967	American Cinema Editors	Best Edited Feature Film	The Professionals	Nominated
1972	American Cinema Editors	Best Edited Feature Film	The Godfather	Nominated
1973	Academy of Motion Picture Arts and Sciences	Best Film Editing	The Godfather	Nominated
1974	British Academy of Film and Television Arts	Best Editing	The Godfather Part II	Nominated
1978	American Cinema Editors	Best Edited Feature Film	The Deer Hunter	Won
1979	British Academy of Film and Television Arts	Best Editing	The Deer Hunter	Won
1979	Academy of Motion Picture Arts and Sciences	Best Film Editing	The Deer Hunter	Won
1983	Academy of Motion Picture Arts and Sciences	Best Film Editing	An Officer and a Gentleman	Nominated
1984	Academy of Television Arts & Sciences	Outstanding Editing for a Limited Series or Movie	War and Remembrance	Won
1989	American Cinema Editors	Best Edited Television Mini-Series	War and Remembrance	Won
1990	Academy of Television Arts & Sciences	Outstanding Editing for a Limited Series or Movie	War and Remembrance	Won
1992	American Cinema Editors	Best Edited Television Special	Citizen Cohn	Won
1993	CableACE Awards	Best Editing in a Dramatic Special	Citizen Cohn	Nominated
1993	Academy of Television Arts & Sciences	Outstanding Editing for a Limited Series or Movie	Citizen Cohn	Won
2000	American Cinema Editors	Best Edited Motion Picture for Non-Commercial Television	Dirty Pictures	Won
2002	Academy of Television Arts & Sciences	Outstanding Television Movie	Conspiracy	Nominated
2002	Academy of Television Arts & Sciences	Outstanding Editing for a Limited Series or Movie	Conspiracy	Nominated
