= McCreary Moves In =

1958 novel by Morris West as "Michael East"

- 1974 edition
- Author: Morris West as "Michael East"
- Language: English
- Genre: adventure
- Publisher: Heinemann
- Publication date: 1958
- Publication place: Australia
- Media type: Print
- Pages: 194

McCreary Moves In is a 1958 novel by Morris West writing under the name "Michael East".

== Premise ==
Mick McCreary is an unemployed oilman offered to run a drilling operation on a remote island. He gets involved in murder, intrigue and fraud.

== Reception ==
The Pacific Islands Monthly called it "a piece of lurid adventure fiction." The Sydney Morning Herald called it "Bigges plus sex."

== TV series ==
It was adapted into a 1957 TV series in England by ABC Weekend Television of 7 episodes of 30 minutes.
