= Cassidy (West novel) =

Novel by Australian writer Morris West

- Author: Morris West
- Language: English
- Genre: Fiction
- Publisher: Hodder and Stoughton
- Publication date: 1986
- Publication place: Australia
- Media type: Print
- Pages: 251 pp.
- ISBN: 0340364742
- Preceded by: The World Is Made of Glass
- Followed by: Masterclass

Cassidy (1986) is a novel by Australian writer Morris West. It was originally published by Hodder and Stoughton in England in 1986.

== Synopsis ==
Charles Parnell Cassidy is the corrupt fictional Premier of New South Wales. Rather than delegating his corrupt activities he undertakes them himself, keeping full records and dossiers on those who oppose him. He appoints his son-in-law, Martin Gregory, as his executor. On Cassidy's death Gregory discovers $10 million in assets in Cassidy's estate, but also another $500 million stashed away in a Swiss bank. Gregory's life comes in danger when Cassidy's enemies attempt to recover the money.

== Critical reception ==
Stan Barney, in The Canberra Times rated the novel "Not one of West's best, but good entertainment."

In her literary study of West and his work, Maryanne Confoy noted: "West's questioning standpoint in relation to life meant that he needed to work out his own response to new and problematic questions that were surfacing in his world. In Cassidy West took the question of killing to a new ethical depth when he described the squeaky-clean and morally righteous lawyer Martin Gregory and his relationship with his father-in-law, Charles Parnell Cassidy, Premier of New South Wales, a man 'simple as a biblical serpent'."

== Publication history ==
After its original publication in 1986 in England by publishers Hodder and Stoughton the novel was later published as follows:

- Doubleday, USA, 1986
- Allen & Unwin, Australia, 2017

and many other paperback editions.

The novel was translated into Swedish, Spanish and Portuguese in 1986; German, Italian, French and Norwegian in 1987; Greek in 1988; Czech in 1991; and Polish in 1992.

== Notes ==
- Dedication: For our grandchildren Jonathan, Gemma and Nicola a parable of the follies of their elders
- Epigraph: "He hated a fool, and he hated a rogue, and he hated a Whig. He was a very good hater." (Samuel Johnson on the Earl of Bathurst)

== Television adaptation ==
The novel was adapted for television in 1989 and was screened on ABC Television in Australia. The series was directed by Carl Schultz and Derek Hayes from a screenplay by Joanna Murray-Smith. It featured Bill Hunter in the lead role.

== See also ==
- 1986 in Australian literature
