= The Big Story (West novel) =

Novel by Australian writer Morris West

- Author: Morris West
- Language: English
- Genre: Fiction
- Publisher: Heinemann
- Publication date: 1957
- Publication place: Australia
- Media type: Print
- Pages: 227pp.
- Preceded by: Kundu
- Followed by: The Second Victory

The Big Story (1957) is a novel by Australian writer Morris West.

It was also published in the USA under the title The Crooked Road. The book was adapted into a movie under that title.

== Frontispiece quotation ==
"It must be considered that there is nothing more difficult to carry out, nor more doubtful of success, nor more dangerous to handle, than to initiate a new order of things. For the reformer has enemies in all those who profit by the old order, and only lukewarm defenders in all those who would profit by the new." — Machiavelli, The Prince

== Synopsis ==
Richard Ashley is a journalist living in Italy. He comes across a story that threatens to overthrow Vittorio, Duke of Orgagna, a corrupt politician. But then Ashley falls in love with the Duke's wife and everything starts to take on a deeper, darker menace.

== Critical reception ==
A Sydney Morning Herald profile on the author, at the time of his death, said it was "his initial foray into the world of Italian politics. To this stage, there is nothing to indicate international prominence."

In her literary study of West and his work, Maryanne Confoy noted: "Written in the middle of West's own personal and professional struggles, this novel addresses the mid-life issues of the ordinary male, the need for a purpose in life, the questioning as to the significance of one's activities, career and relationships...The novel is preoccupied with truth and honesty, with telling lies in one's own life, with lies in the social fabric and their effects on relationships in both the short and long term."

== Publication history ==
After its original publication in 1957 in England by publishers Heinemann the novel was later published as follows:

- William Morrow, USA, 1957 (with the title The Crooked Road)
- Pan Books, UK, 1959
- Dell Publishing, USA, 1962
- Allen & Unwin, Australia, 2017

and many other paperback editions.

The novel was also translated into Dutch (1959).

== Radio adaptation ==
ABC Weekly 18 May 1958

The novel was serialised for Australian radio in 1958. The drama was presented in 15 minute installments. It was read by Don Pascoe.

== Film adaptation ==
A film adaptation of this novel was produced in 1965 under the title The Crooked Road. The screenplay was written by Don Chaffey and Jay Garrison, directed by Don Chaffey and featured Robert Ryan, Stewart Granger and Nadia Gray in the leading roles.

== See also ==
- 1957 in Australian literature
