= The Tower of Babel (novel) =

1968 novel by Australian writer Morris West

- First edition
- Author: Morris West
- Language: English
- Publisher: Heinemann, London
- Publication date: 1968
- Media type: Print
- Pages: 340 pp
- Preceded by: The Ambassador
- Followed by: Summer of the Red Wolf

The Tower of Babel (1968) is a novel by Australian writer Morris West.

== Plot summary ==
The novel is set in the Middle East on the brink of war. The story begins with a border incident that is followed by an Israeli invasion of Jordan.

== Critical reception ==
John Graham, writing in The Canberra Times, noted changes in the writer's style: "The atmosphere of dramatic fiction which pervades this novel is a far cry from his earlier works, notably Children of the Sun and The Devil's Advocate. Since those admirable and essentially simple studies of the Christian conscience he has moved towards the political novel with more enthusiasm than aptitude. His simpler themes earned him his original reputation."

The reviewer in Kirkus Reviews found the novel less than impressive: "Easy to read, easy to forget. Written to formula, devoid of inspiration. Coated over with a shopworn eloquence which only serves to undermine the author's long-standing and convincing moral concerns."

== See also ==
- 1968 in Australian literature

== Notes ==
- Dedication: In Memoriam/ Stanley L. Bartlett// My first editor and my dear friend/ A rare and gentle man// Obiit 1966
