= Paola Pitagora =

Italian actress

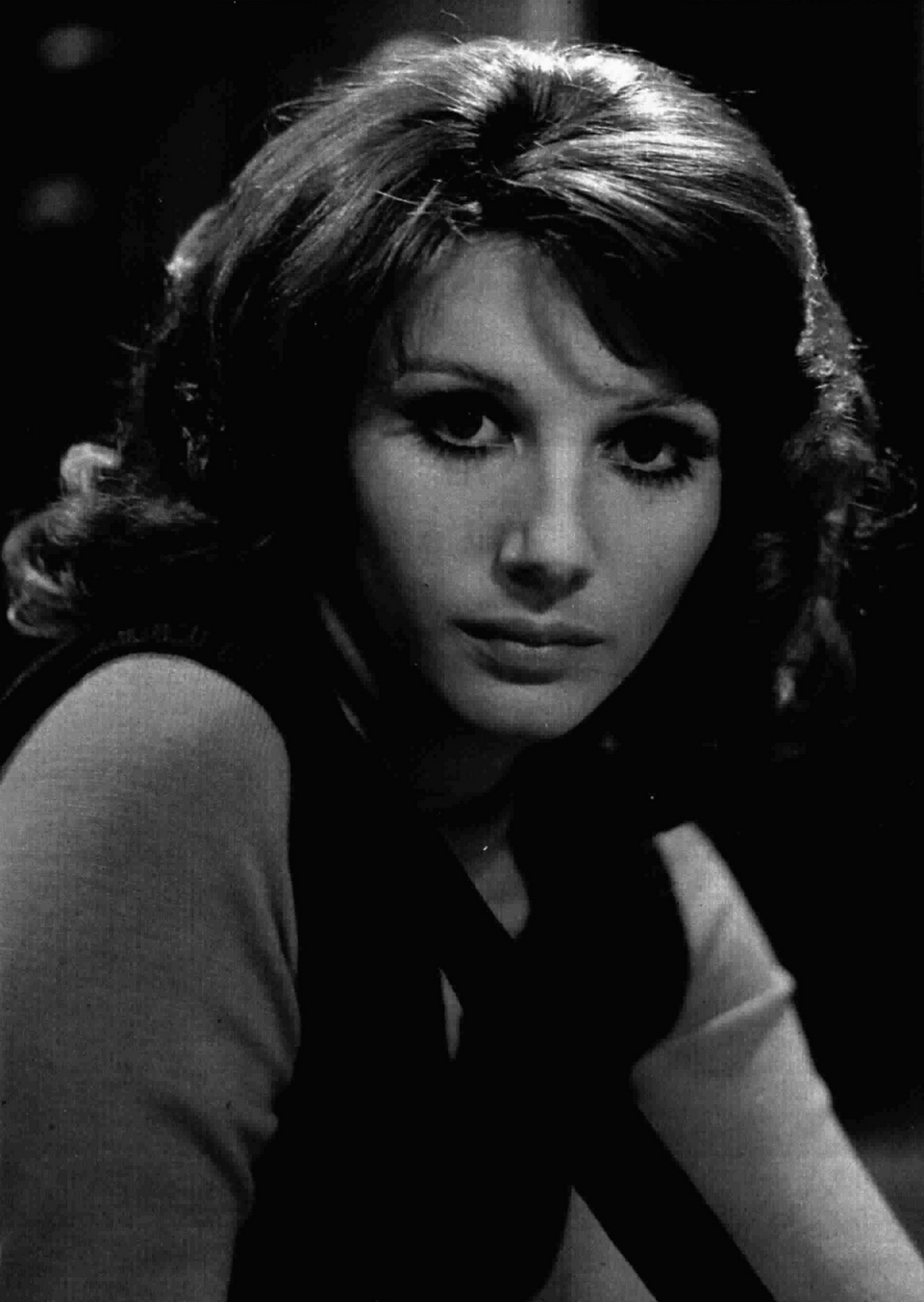
- Pitagora in 1972
- Born: Paola Gargaloni; 24 August 1941 (age 84); Parma, Kingdom of Italy
- Occupation: Actress
- Years active: 1959–present

Paola Pitagora (born 24 August 1941) is an Italian film actress. She has appeared in 50 films since 1959.

== Biography ==
Born in Parma, Italy, Pitagora attended the Centro Sperimentale di Cinematografia and the acting school by Alessandro Fersen. In 1960 she debuted as a RAI TV hostess of variety and infortaintment programs. In 1962 she made her theatrical debut with Gog e Magog, then appeared in a great number of stage works. In 1965 she achieved a wide popularity with the leading role of Lucia in the TV series I Promessi sposi directed by Sandro Bolchi. She later starred on several other TV series, having one another remarkable success in 1972 with the sci-fi series A come Andromeda.

Pitagora's film career started in 1959 with an uncredited role in Costa azzurra; she had fewer opportunities to show her talent at cinema, where is probably best known for the role of the unstable Giulia of Marco Bellocchio's Fists in the Pocket (1965). In 1969 she won the Nastro d'Argento for best actress thanks to her performance in the Luigi Comencini's giallo Unknown Woman.

Pitagora is also an author of songs for children; her song "La giacca rotta" won the Zecchino d'Oro in 1962. She considers herself a "dubious" Catholic.

== Selected filmography ==
- Shots in Threequarter Time (1965)
- Fists in the Pocket (1965)
- Pardon, Are You For or Against? (1966)
- Death on the Run (1967)
- The Girl Who Couldn't Say No (1968)
- In Search of Gregory (1969)
- Psychout for Murder (1969)
- Unknown Woman (1969)
- Les Assassins de l'ordre (1971)
- A come Andromeda (1971) (TV)
- Il sindacalista (1972)
- The Hassled Hooker (1972)
- Night Flight from Moscow (1973)
- Revolver (1973)
- The Devil's Advocate (1977)
- Help Me Dream (1981)
- Once a Year, Every Year (1994)
