= The Second Victory (film) =

1987 film by Gerald Thomas

- Directed by: Gerald Thomas
- Written by: Morris West
- Screenplay by: Morris West
- Based on: A novel by Morris West
- Produced by: Gerald Thomas
- Starring: Anthony Andrews; Helmut Griem; Max von Sydow; Mario Adorf; Renée Soutendijk; Birgit Doll; Günther Maria Halmer
- Music by: Stanley Myers
- Release date: 1987

The Second Victory is a 1987 British drama film directed by Gerald Thomas and produced by Melaleuka North Investments. It was released by Filmworld Distributors Inc. and was filmed in colour. It is set in Allied-occupied Austria at the end of the Second World War. Anthony Andrews stars as Major Hanlon, a British officer, with Helmut Griem as Karl Fischer and Max von Sydow as Dr. Huber. The film was based on a 1958 book of the same name by Morris West.
