= The Shoes of the Fisherman (novel) =

Novel by Morris West

- First edition
- Author: Morris West
- Language: English
- Publisher: Morrow
- Publication date: 1963
- Publication place: Australia
- Media type: Hardcover and Paperback
- Preceded by: Daughter of Silence
- Followed by: The Ambassador

The Shoes of the Fisherman is a novel by Australian writer Morris West first published in 1963.

The novel concerns the election of a Ukrainian pope and is a dissection of Vatican politics. The protagonist, Kiril Pavlovich Lakota, appointed a cardinal in pectore by the previous pope, was inspired by the lives of two Ukrainian Catholic bishops: Cardinal Josyf Slipyj and Bishop Hryhorij Lakota. Slipyj was released by Nikita Khrushchev's administration from a Siberian Gulag in 1963, the year of the novel's publication, after political pressure from Pope John XXIII and United States President John F. Kennedy. Slipyj arrived in Rome in time to participate in the Second Vatican Council. Lakota died in 1950 in a Soviet Gulag. A sub-plot deals with Kiril's relationship with a controversial theologian and scientist, Father Telemond. Many of the characteristics of Father Telemond were based on the controversial French Jesuit palaeontologist Pierre Teilhard de Chardin.

The book was coincidently published on 3 June 1963, the day Pope John XXIII died. The book reached No. 1 on The New York Times Best Seller List for adult fiction on 30 June 1963, and became the No. 1 best-selling novel in the United States for that year, according to Publishers Weekly. In the story, Kiril Lakota, the protagonist and archbishop of Lviv was created cardinal with the title of St. Athanasius. In 1965, Josyf Slipyj, Archbishop (later Major-Archbishop) of Lviv was proclaimed a cardinal with the title of Sant'Atanasio (St. Athanasius) by Pope Paul VI.

A movie version directed by Michael Anderson was released in 1968.

In 2019 the novel was published in Ukrainian with illustrations of Pope Kiril drawn from photographs of Slipyj.
