= 1877 in Australian literature =

This article presents a list of the historical events and publications of Australian literature during 1877.

== Books ==
- Ada Cambridge — My Guardian : A Story of the Fen Country
- Maud Jean Franc
  - Little Mercy
  - Two Sides to Every Question

== Children's fiction ==
- Henry Kingsley — The Mystery of the Island

== Poetry ==
- Henry Kendall — "Ode to a Black Gin"
- Emily Manning — The Balance of Pain and Other Poems
- James Brunton Stephens — "The Dominion"

== Short stories ==
- Marcus Clarke — "The Future Australian Race"

== Births ==
- 17 January — May Gibbs, writer for children (died 1969)
- 28 July — Emily Bulcock, poet and dramatist (died 1969)
- 10 December — Bertha Southey Brammall, poet and novelist (died 1957)

Unknown date

- Harry Tighe, playwright and novelist (died 1946)

== See also ==
- 1877 in Australia
- 1877 in literature
- 1877 in poetry
- List of years in Australian literature
- List of years in literature
