= 1974 in Australian literature =

This article presents a list of the historical events and publications of Australian literature during 1974.

== Events ==
- The Patrick White Award is presented for the first time. White used his 1973 Nobel Prize in Literature award to establish a trust for this prize.
- The Age Book of the Year Awards are presented for the first time. The first set of awards consisted of the Fiction (or Imaginative Writing) Award and the Non-fiction Award. In addition, one of the two award winners was also named The Age Book of the Year.

== Major publications ==
=== Books ===
- James Aldridge – Mockery in Arms
- Jon Cleary – Peter's Pence
- David Foster – The Pure Land
- Catherine Gaskin – The Property of a Gentleman
- David Ireland – Burn
- Thomas Keneally – Blood Red, Sister Rose
- Colleen McCullough – Tim
- Ronald McKie – The Mango Tree
- Gerald Murnane – Tamarisk Row
- Morris West – Harlequin
- Thea Astley - A Kindness Cup

=== Short stories ===
- Peter Carey – The Fat Man in History
- Frank Moorhouse – The Electrical Experience : A Discontinuous Narrative
- Patrick White – The Cockatoos : Shorter Novels and Stories

=== Science Fiction and Fantasy ===
- A. Bertram Chandler – The Bitter Pill
- Cherry Wilder – "The Ark of James Carlyle"

=== Children's and Young Adult fiction ===
- James Aldridge – The Marvellous Mongolian
- Mavis Thorpe Clark – The Sky is Free
- Ruth Park – Callie's Castle
- Joan Phipson – Helping Horse
- Colin Thiele
  - Albatross Two
  - Magpie Island

=== Poetry ===
- Bruce Beaver – Lauds and Plaints : Poems (1968–1972)
- Robert Gray – Creekwater Journal
- Clive James – Peregrine Prykke's Pilgrimage Through the London Literary World : A Tragedy in Heroic Couplets
- Jennifer Maiden – Tactics
- David Malouf – Neighbours in a Thicket : Poems
- Les Murray
  - "The Broad Bean Sermon"
  - Lunch and Counter Lunch
  - "The Mitchells"

=== Drama ===
- Louis Nowra – The Death of Joe Orton
- Jim McNeill – How Does Your Garden Grow?
- David Williamson – The Department

=== Biography ===
- Ivan Southall – Fly West

== Awards and honours ==
=== Lifetime achievement ===
Award	Author
Christopher Brennan Award	R. D. Fitzgerald
Patrick White Award	Christina Stead

=== Literary ===
Award	Author	Title	Publisher
The Age Book of the Year Award	David Foster	The Pure Land	Macmillan
ALS Gold Medal	David Malouf	Neighbours in a Thicket : Poems	University of Queensland Press
Colin Roderick Award	David Malouf	Neighbours in a Thicket : Poems	University of Queensland Press

=== Fiction ===
Award	Author	Title	Publisher
The Age Book of the Year Award	David Foster	The Pure Land	Macmillan
Miles Franklin Award	Ronald McKie	The Mango Tree	Collins

=== Children and Young Adult ===
Award	Category	Author	Title	Publisher
Children's Book of the Year Award	Older Readers	Patricia Wrightson	The Nargun and the Stars	Hutchinson
Children's Book of the Year Award	Picture Book	Jenny Wagner, illustrated by Ron Brooks	The Bunyip of Berkeley's Creek	Longman Young

=== Science fiction and fantasy ===
Award	Category	Author	Title	Publisher
Australian SF Achievement Award	Best Australian Science Fiction	Not awarded		

=== Poetry ===
Award	Author	Title	Publisher
Grace Leven Prize for Poetry	David Malouf	Neighbours in a Thicket : Poems	University of Queensland Press

=== Drama ===
Award	Author	Title
AWGIE Award for Stage	Dorothy Hewett	Bonbons and Roses for Dolly
AWGIE Award for Stage	Ron Blair	President Wilson in Paris

=== Non-fiction ===
Award	Author	Title	Publisher
The Age Book of the Year Award	Manning Clark	A History of Australia Vol. 3	Melbourne University Press

== Births ==
A list, ordered by date of birth (and, if the date is either unspecified or repeated, ordered alphabetically by surname) of births in 1974 of Australian literary figures, authors of written works or literature-related individuals follows, including year of death.

- 9 June — Anna Goldsworthy, writer, teacher and classical pianist
- 14 June — Scott Monk, author
- 2 July — Matthew Reilly, author
- 27 December — Penni Russon, children's author

Unknown date

- Alyssa Brugman, author of fiction for young adults
- Shaun Tan, artist and author

== Deaths ==
A list, ordered by date of death (and, if the date is either unspecified or repeated, ordered alphabetically by surname) of deaths in 1974 of Australian literary figures, authors of written works or literature-related individuals follows, including year of birth.

- 7 January – Nan McDonald, writer for children (born 1921)
- 21 January – R. G. Howarth, poet and critic (born 1906)
- June – Eve Langley, novelist and poet (born 1904)

== See also ==
- 1974 in Australia
- 1974 in literature
- 1974 in poetry
- List of years in Australian literature
- List of years in literature
