= 1969 in Australian literature =

This article presents a list of the historical events and publications of Australian literature during 1969.

== Books ==
- Mena Calthorpe – The Defectors
- Jon Cleary – Remember Jack Hoxie
- Dymphna Cusack – The Half-Burnt Tree
- Sumner Locke Elliott – Edens Lost
- George Johnston – Clean Straw for Nothing
- Thomas Keneally – The Survivor
- D'Arcy Niland – Dead Men Running
- F. J. Thwaites – No Love to Give

== Short stories ==
- Manning Clark – Disquiet and Other Stories
- Lyndall Hadow – Full Cycle and Other Stories
- Lee Harding – "Dancing Gerontius"
- T. A. G. Hungerford – "Wong Chu and the Queen's Letterbox"
- Frank Moorhouse – Futility and Other Animals
- Dal Stivens – Selected Stories 1936-1968

== Children's and young adult fiction ==
- Hesba Brinsmead – Isle of the Sea Horse
- Annette Macarthur-Onslow – Uhu
- Joan Phipson – Peter and Butch
- Ivan Southall – Finn's Folly
- Eleanor Spence – Jamberoo Road
- Colin Thiele – Blue Fin

== Poetry ==
- Bruce Beaver – Letters to Live Poets
- Gwen Harwood
  - "Barn Owl"
  - "Father and Child"
- A. D. Hope – New Poems, 1956-1969
- James McAuley – Surprises of the Sun
- David Malouf – "The Year of the Foxes"
- Les Murray
  - "An Absolutely Ordinary Rainbow"
  - The Weatherboard Cathedral
- Thomas Shapcott – Inwards to the Sun : Poems
- Randolph Stow – A Counterfeit Silence: Selected Poems

== Drama ==
- Dorothy Hewett – Mrs Porter and the Angel
- Morris West – The Heretic

== Awards and honours ==
=== Literary ===
Award	Author	Title	Publisher
ALS Gold Medal	No award		
Colin Roderick Award	Francis Webb	Collected Poems	Angus and Robertson
Miles Franklin Award	George Johnston	Clean Straw for Nothing	Collins

=== Children and young adult ===
Award	Category	Author	Title	Publisher
Children's Book of the Year Award	Older Readers	Margaret Balderson	When Jays Fly to Barbmo	Oxford University Press
Children's Book of the Year Award	Picture Book	Ivan Southall, illustrated by Ted Greenwood	Sly Old Wardrobe	Cheshire

=== Science fiction and fantasy ===
Award	Category	Author	Title	Publisher
Australian SF Achievement Award	Best Australian Science Fiction	A. Bertram Chandler	False Fatherland	Horwitz

=== Poetry ===
Award	Author	Title	Publisher
Grace Leven Prize for Poetry	Randolph Stow	A Counterfeit Silence: Selected Poems	Angus and Robertson

== Births ==
A list, ordered by date of birth (and, if the date is either unspecified or repeated, ordered alphabetically by surname) of births in 1969 of Australian literary figures, authors of written works or literature-related individuals follows, including year of death.

- 1 April – Larissa Behrendt, novelist and academic
- 23 October – Trudi Canavan, novelist

Unknown date

- Tegan Bennett Daylight, novelist

== Deaths ==
A list, ordered by date of death (and, if the date is either unspecified or repeated, ordered alphabetically by surname) of deaths in 1969 of Australian literary figures, authors of written works or literature-related individuals follows, including year of birth.

- 2 February — William Hatfield, novelist (born 1892)
- 8 July – Charmian Clift, novelist (born 1923)
- 12 July — Henry George Lamond, novelist (born 1885)
- 4 September – Emily Bulcock, poet and journalist (born 1877)
- 2 October – Katharine Susannah Prichard, novelist (born 1883)
- 11 October – Marie Bjelke Petersen, novelist (born 1874)
- 21 November – Norman Lindsay, novelist and artist (born 1879)
- 27 November – May Gibbs, writer for children (born 1877)

Unknown date

- Kathleen Dalziel, poet (born 1881)

== See also ==
- 1969 in Australia
- 1969 in literature
- 1969 in poetry
- List of years in Australian literature
- List of years in literature
