= 1885 in Australian literature =

This article presents a list of the historical events and publications of Australian literature during 1885.

== Events ==
- Table Talk published its first issue on 26 June 1885.

== Books ==
- Francis Adams — Leicester : An Autobiography
- Rolf Boldrewood
  - The Crooked Stick, or, Pollie's Probation
  - The Sealskin Cloak
- Ada Cambridge — A Little Minx : A Sketch
- Mary Fortune — Dan Lyons' Doom
- Rosa Praed
  - Affinities : A Romance of To-Day
  - The Head Station : A Novel of Australian Life

== Poetry ==
- Victor Daley
  - "On the River"
  - "On the Shore"
- George Essex Evans — "Australia Militant"
- Mary Hannay Foott
  - "Happy Days"
  - "No Message"
  - Where the Pelican Builds and Other Poems
- Philip J. Holdsworth — "My Queen of Dreams"
- Henry Parkes — The Beauteous Terrorist and Other Poems
- A. B. Paterson — "El Mahdi to the Australian Troops"
- J. Brunton Stephens — Convict Once and Other Poems

== Short stories ==
- Rolf Boldrewood
  - "A Canvas Town Romance"
  - "A Transformation Scene"
- Rosa Praed — Australian Life, Black and White

== Births ==
A list, ordered by date of birth (and, if the date is either unspecified or repeated, ordered alphabetically by surname) of births in 1885 of Australian literary figures, authors of written works or literature-related individuals follows, including year of death.

- 20 March – Ruby Lindsay, artist and writer (died 1919)
- 13 June – Henry George Lamond, novelist (died 1969)
- 1 July – Dorothea Mackellar, poet (died 1968)
- 5 July – Rose Lindsay, artist's model, author, and printmaker (died 1978)
- 18 August – Nettie Palmer, critic (died 1964)
- 28 August – Vance Palmer, novelist (died 1959)
- 18 September – Edward George Honey, journalist (died 1922 in England)

== Deaths ==
A list, ordered by date of death (and, if the date is either unspecified or repeated, ordered alphabetically by surname) of deaths in 1885 of Australian literary figures, authors of written works or literature-related individuals follows, including year of birth.

Unknown date

- Ellen Liston, schoolteacher, short story writer and poet (born 1838 in England)

== See also ==
- 1885 in Australia
- 1885 in literature
- 1885 in poetry
- List of years in Australian literature
- List of years in literature
