= 1871 in Australian literature =

This article presents a list of the historical events and publications of Australian literature during 1871.

== Books ==
- Louisa Atkinson — Tom Hellicar's Children
- Mary Anne Broome — A Christmas Cake in Four Quarters
- Charles de Boos — Mark Brown's Wife : A Tale of the Gold-Fields
- B. L. Farjeon — Joshua Marvel
- Mary Fortune — The Bushranger's Autobiography

== Short stories ==
- Marcus Clarke — Old Tales of a Young Country (edited)
- Mary Fortune — The Detective's Album : Tales of the Australian Police

== Poetry ==
- George Carrington — "To the Gulf"
- Mowbray Morris — "A Voice from the Bush"
- J. Brunton Stephens — Convict Once

== Essays ==
- Henry Kendall — "A Colonial Literary Club"

== Births ==
A list, ordered by date of birth (and, if the date is either unspecified or repeated, ordered alphabetically by surname) of births in 1871 of Australian literary figures, authors of written works or literature-related individuals follows, including year of death.

- 24 January — Oscar Asche, playwright and novelist (died 1936)
- 18 July — Percival Serle, biographer and bibliographer (died 1951)
- 2 September — John Le Gay Brereton, poet (died 1933)
- 21 October — Louis Stone, novelist (died 1935)

== See also ==
- 1871 in Australia
- 1871 in literature
- 1871 in poetry
- List of years in Australian literature
- List of years in literature
