= A Counterfeit Silence: Selected Poems =

Collected poetry by Randolph Stow

A Counterfeit Silence : Selected Poems
- First edition
- Author: Randolph Stow
- Language: English
- Genre: Poetry collection
- Publisher: Angus and Robertson
- Publication date: 1969
- Publication place: Australia
- Media type: Print
- Pages: 76 pp
- Preceded by: The Merry-Go-Round in the Sea
- Followed by: Visitants

A Counterfeit Silence : Selected Poems (1969) is a poetry collection by Australian poet and novelist Randolph Stow. It won the Grace Leven Prize for Poetry in 1969.

The collection consists of 65 poems, most of which were published in various Australian poetry publications.

== Contents ==
- "The Farmer's Tale"
- "Seashells and Sandalwood"
- "Sea Children"
- "Country Children"
- "As He Lay Dying"
- "The Recluse"
- "The Ship Becalmed"
- "Child Portraits, with Background : On Northern Downs"
- "Child Portraits, with Background : In Southern Forest"
- "The Conventional Young Man, at Springtime"
- "The Language of Flowers" - A Handbook for Victorian Lovers"
- "For One Dying : Miss Sutherland MacDonald, 1873-1956"
- "Socratic Dialogue"
- "Before Eden"
- "The First Monarch"
- "Madame Yuan Ying Disoriented"
- "Chorale for The Death of Icarus"
- "Rite of Spring"
- "A Fancy for His Death"
- "The Ghost at Anlaby"
- "In Praise of Hillbillies"
- "The Embarkation"
- "Dust"
- "The Utopia of Lord Mayor Howard"
- "Portrait of Luke"
- "Wine"
- "At Sandalwood"
- "Ruins of the City of Hay"
- "The Land's Meaning"
- "Strange Fruit"
- "The Dying Chair"
- "Sleep"
- "Kapisim! O Kiriwina"
- "Endymion"
- "Jimmy Woodsers"
- "Landscapes"
- "Convalescence"
- "Outrider"
- "The Calenture"
- "Landfall"
- "A Feast"
- "The Singing Bones"
- "A Wind from the Sea"
- "Western Wind When Will Thou Blow"
- "Ishmael"
- "Persephone"
- "A Man is Like This"
- Stations: Suite for Three Voices and Three Generations, sequence
  - "The Dark Women Go Down"
  - "Stations: Suite for Three Voices and Three Generations : Forever to Remain. The Man"
  - "Stations : Suite for Three Voices and Three Generations : My Wish for My Land. The Woman"
  - "Stations: Suite for Three Voices and Three Generations : Here Also Let the Troubling Dream. The Youth"
  - "Stations: Suite for Three Voices and Three Generations : The Earth and World Besiege Us. The Man"
  - "Stations: Suite for Three Voices and Three Generations : The Garden Runs Wild. The Woman"
  - "Stations: Suite for Three Voices and Three Generations : The Grief of Younger Brothers. The Youth"
- Thailand Railway, sequence
  - "1. The Jungle"
  - "2. Slaves"
  - "3. The Track"
  - "4. The Enemy"
  - "5. The Sleepers"
  - "6. The Fire"
  - "7. Hands"
  - "8. Fever"
  - "9. Bring Your Piano"
  - "10. The Children"
- "From The Testament of Tourmaline : Variations on Themes of the Tao Teh Ching"

== Critical reception ==
Geoff Page, reviewing the collection in The Canberra Times, found a unique voice: "Randolph Stow is one of the few younger Australian poets who have found truly individual voices. It is a voice which will not please everyone for it can be high-pitched and contorted but it is unique, and that, these days, is a distinct achievement."

While reviewing the book as a part of a survey of Australian poetry of the time, Ronald Dunlop noted: "Here, landscape slips into place. Randolph Stow’s poetry, strongly rooted in the earth, reaches out from it to the other world of humanity. Essentially the poetry of experience, its promise is great, its performance so far impressive."

== See also ==
- 1969 in Australian literature

== Notes ==
- Epigraph: "Even speech was for them a debased form of silence; how much more futile is poetry, which is a debased form of speech." Thornton Wilder: The Bridge of San Luis Rey
- Dedication: To Jock Curle
