= The Mango Tree =

1974 novel by Ronald McKie

- First edition
- Author: Ronald McKie
- Language: English
- Publisher: Collins, Australia
- Publication date: 1974
- Publication place: Australia
- Media type: Print (hardback and paperback)
- Pages: 211
- ISBN: 0-00-221586-1
- OCLC: 1120471
- Dewey Decimal: 823
- LC Class: PZ4.M15754 Man3 PR9619.3.M256
- Preceded by: The Heroes
- Followed by: The Crushing

The Mango Tree is a Miles Franklin Award-winning novel by Australian author Ronald McKie.

== Synopsis ==
The story follows the childhood of a young man, named Jamie, growing up in a country town in Australia during the early 20th century.

== Critical reception ==
Hope Hewitt in The Canberra Times found the author to be "an excellent reporter, quickly setting scene and then swiftly changing gear and catching the cxcitement of events moving too quickly for words. The climax of this book when the fanatic Preacher Jones goes round the bend and rampages off with a gun is a gripping piece of narrative. But good documentary and good reportage are not the same as good imaginative fiction. Their purposes are different; and in trying to concentrate as we clearly are meant to, on Jamie's development to whatever sort of person he is going to be, there needs to be a much greater selection and a different scale of proportions among the too rich material Mr McKie has to draw upon."

== Awards ==
- Miles Franklin Award, 1974
- Barbara Ramsden Award, 1974

== Film Adaptation ==
In 1977, it was adapted into a film of the same name, directed by Kevin James Dobson, from a script by Michael Pate, and featuring Gerald Fitzgerald, Robert Helpmann and Christopher Pate in the lead roles.

== See also ==
- 1974 in Australian literature
