= Fredy Neptune =

Verse novel by Les Murray

- First edition
- Author: Les Murray
- Illustrator: Mike Golding
- Cover artist: Alex Snellgrove
- Language: Australian English
- Genre: Novel in verse
- Publisher: Duffy & Snellgrove
- Publication date: 1998
- Publication place: Australia
- Media type: Print (Paperback)
- Pages: 265
- ISBN: 1-875989-30-7
- OCLC: 222423058

Fredy Neptune: A Novel in Verse (1998) is a verse novel by the Australian poet Les Murray.

Told in eight-line stanzas, Fredy Neptune describes the experiences of Fred Boettcher, an Australian of German parentage, during the years between the world wars. The British poet Ruth Padel described the work as "a haunting, loving, fiercely democratic epic by a master poet." It won the 1998 Queensland Premier's Literary Awards Fiction Book Award.

In Village Voice, Steve Burt wrote: "Fredy Neptune is Murray's best work yet, an almost completely successful round-the-world adventure novel in enticing, flexibly slangy (and very Australian-sounding) eight-line stanzas."

== Structure ==
The work is divided into five sections:

- Book I: The Middle Sea
- Book II: Barking at the Thunder
- Book III: Prop Sabres
- Book IV: The Police Revolution
- Book V: Lazarus Unstuck
