= Michael Pate =

Australian actor and filmmaker (1920–2008)

Michael Pate OAM
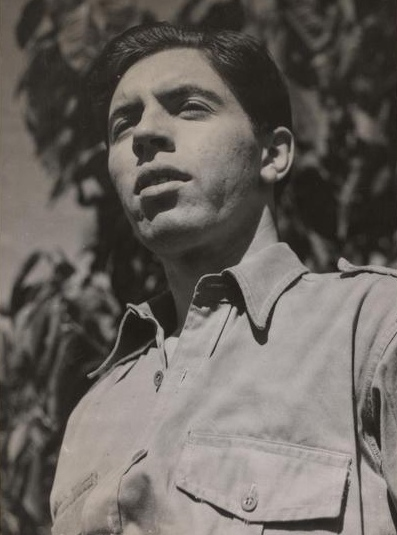
- Pate, circa 1938
- Born: Edward John Pate; 26 February 1920; Drummoyne, New South Wales, Australia
- Died: 1 September 2008 (aged 88); Gosford, New South Wales, Australia
- Occupations: Actor; writer; film producer; director
- Years active: 1938–2008
- Spouse: Felippa Rock (m. 1951)
- Children: Christopher Pate
- Relatives: Joe Rock (father-in-law)

Edward John Pate OAM (26 February 1920 – 1 September 2008), known professionally as Michael Pate, was an Australian actor, writer, film producer, and director. He was a prolific supporting player in American films and television series during the 1950's and 60's, and in the following decades, both an actor and filmmaker in his native country.

Pate won a Penguin Award for his performance on the Network 10 police drama Matlock Police (1971–76), and was nominated for an AACTA Award for Best Adapted Screenplay for The Mango Tree (1977).

== Early years ==
Pate was born in Drummoyne, New South Wales, and attended Fort Street High School. Initially interested in becoming a medical missionary, but unable to afford the university fees due to the Depression,

=== Early career ===
Pate began working in Sydney before 1938, aged 18, when he became a writer and broadcaster for the Australian Broadcasting Commission, collaborating with George Ivan Smith on Youth Speaks. For the remainder of the 1930s, he worked primarily in radio drama. He also published theatrical and literary criticism and enjoyed brief success as an author of short stories, publishing works in both Australia and the United States.

During World War II, Pate served in the Australian Army in the South West Pacific Area. He was transferred to the 1st Australian Army Amenities Entertainment Unit, known as "The Islanders", entertaining Australian troops in various combat areas. After the war, Pate returned to radio working in radio plays and serials

== Career ==
=== Early screen roles in Australia ===
Pate post-WWII transitioned to screen in 1946, and in 1949 he appeared in his first leading role in Sons of Matthew. In 1950, he appeared in Bitter Springs with Tommy Trinder and Chips Rafferty. That same year Pate also adapted, produced, and directed two plays: Dark of the Moon and Bonaventure.

=== Hollywood, 1950s–1960s ===
Later in 1950 he travelled to the United States to appear in a film adaptation of Bonaventure for Universal Pictures, which was released in 1951 as Thunder on the Hill, starring Claudette Colbert and Ann Blyth. Pate spent most of the remainder of the 1950s in the United States, appearing in over 300 television shows and films. Most notable among those was a 1954 Climax! live production of Ian Fleming's Casino Royale, in which Pate played the role of "Clarence Leiter", opposite Barry Nelson's "Jimmy Bond". On the big screen, he played the one-scene role of Flavius in Julius Caesar, the 1953 film adaptation of William Shakespeare's play. In the same year he played for the first time the Apache chief Victorio, a role he would reprise several times in his career, in Australian director John Farrow's western Hondo playing opposite John Wayne. Pate later said that this was his favourite film role. He also went on to perform many Native American roles in movies and on television. In 1956 he appeared in the film The Court Jester, and three years later he played the lead role of a gunfighting vampire in the horror film Curse of the Undead. He played parts as well in episodes 27 and 28 of the 1957 television series Zorro along with Guy Williams. Pate in 1963 played the role of Puma, the Comanche chief in Andrew V. McLaglen's western McLintock!, again playing opposite John Wayne.

During his time in the United States, Pate became an acting instructor and lecturer, and wrote many screenplays and plays for American films and television series, including Rawhide ("Incident of the Power and the Plow" with Dick Van Patten) and Most Dangerous Man Alive ("The Steel Monster"). In 1959, he returned briefly to Australia, where he starred in a television presentation of Tragedy in a Temporary Town, shown as part of the Shell Presents anthology drama series. After that project he returned to the United States for another eight years, during which time he enjoyed a successful career as a television character actor, appearing repeatedly on programs such as Gunsmoke, Sugarfoot, The Texan, The Rifleman, Maverick (S4 Ep23),Branded ("Call to Glory"), Daniel Boone, The Virginian, Perry Mason ("The Case of the Skeleton's Closet" and "The Case of the Wednesday Woman"), Batman (episodes 45 "The Clock King's Crazy Crimes" and 46 "The Clock King Gets Crowned"), Mission: Impossible ("Trek"), The Man from U.N.C.L.E. ("The Foreign Legion Affair"), Get Smart, Rawhide ("Incident of the Power and the Plow", "Incident at Superstition Prairie", "Incident of the Boomerang", and others), Voyage to the Bottom of the Sea ("The Traitor"), (Flaming Ice) and Wagon Train. In the 1963 movie PT 109, he played the part of Arthur Reginald Evans, the Australian coast watcher who helped rescue John F. Kennedy and his crew. That role was of the few occasions when Pate played an Australian while working in the United States, others including Four Star Playhouse ("The Firing Squad"), 77 Sunset Strip ("The Down-Under Caper"), and Rawhide ("Incident of the Boomerang", for which he also wrote the story-line).

=== Return to Australia, 1968 ===
In 1968, Pate returned to Australia and became a television producer, winning two Logie Awards while working at the Seven Network. In 1970, he published a textbook on acting, The Film Actor. From 1971 to 1975 he starred as Detective Senior Sergeant Vic Maddern in Matlock Police. After leaving Matlock Police, Pate began working more behind the camera, continuing to work too in theatre in both Sydney and Melbourne. In 1977 he wrote and produced The Mango Tree, starring his son Christopher Pate. In 1979 he adapted the screenplay for Tim from the novel by Colleen McCullough, as well as producing and directing the film, which starred Piper Laurie and Mel Gibson. Pate won the Best Screenplay Award from the Australian Writers Guild for his adaptation.

His film appearances in the 1970s and 1980s included Mad Dog Morgan (1976), introduction in the biopic The Battle of Broken Hill (1981), Duet for Four (1982), The Wild Duck (1984), Death of a Soldier (1986), and Howling III (1987). Pate also appeared as the President of the United States in The Return of Captain Invincible (1982), in which he sings "What the World Needs", a song calling for the return of Captain Invincible to save the world. Additionally, Pate made a television appearance in the updated version of Mission: Impossible (1989). During the early 1980s Pate also collaborated with his son Christopher in a successful stage production of Mass Appeal at the Sydney Opera House.

Although Pate retired from acting in 2001, he remained busy with voiceover work; and he was writing a screenplay at the time of his death.

== Personal life ==
In 1951, Pate married Felippa Rock, daughter of American film producer Joe Rock. The couple had a son, Christopher Pate, also an actor, along with a number of grandchildren and great-grandchildren.

=== Death ===
Pate died at the age of 88 at Gosford Hospital, on the Central Coast of New South Wales, on 1 September 2008.

== Partial filmography ==
=== Film ===
- Forty Thousand Horsemen (1940) as Arab Carpet Seller / Arab Customer / Sikh Policeman (uncredited)
- Sons of Matthew (1949) as Shane O'Riordan
- Bitter Springs (1950) as Trooper
- Thunder on the Hill (1951) as Willie (also screenplay)
- Ten Tall Men (1951) as Browning
- The Strange Door (1951) as Talon
- 5 Fingers (1952) as Morrison (uncredited)
- Face to Face (Part 1, 1952) as Leggatt ("The Secret Sharer")
- The Black Castle (1952) as Count Ernst von Melcher
- Target Hong Kong (1953) as Dockery Pete Gresham
- Rogue's March (1953) as Crane
- The Desert Rats (1953) as Capt. Currie (uncredited)
- Julius Caesar (1953) as Flavius
- Scandal at Scourie (1953) as Rev. Williams
- The Maze (1953) as William
- Houdini (1953) as Dooley
- The Royal African Rifles (1953) as Cunningham
- All the Brothers Were Valiant (1953) as Varde, Second Mate
- Hondo (1953) as Vittoro - Chiricahua Apache Chief
- El Alamein (1953) as Sgt. McQueen
- Secret of the Incas (1954) as Pachacutec
- King Richard and the Crusaders (1954) as Conrad, Marquis of Montferrat
- The Silver Chalice (1954) as Aaron Ben Joseph
- A Lawless Street (1955) as Harley Baskam
- The Court Jester (1955) as Sir Locksley
- The Killer is Loose (1956) as Detective Chris Gillespie
- The Revolt of Mamie Stover (1956) as Harry Adkins
- Congo Crossing (1956) as Bart O'Connell
- Reprisal! (1956) as Bert Shipley
- 7th Cavalry (1956) as Capt. Benteen
- Something of Value (1957) as A Farmer - Joe Matson
- The Oklahoman (1957) as Charlie Smith
- The Tall Stranger (1957) as Charley
- Desert Hell (1958) as Ahitagel
- Wanted Dead or Alive
- Hong Kong Confidential (1958) as John Blanchard
- Westbound (1959) as Mace
- Green Mansions (1959) as Priest
- Curse of the Undead (1959) as Drake Robey / Don Drago Robles
- Walk Like a Dragon (1960) as Rev. Will Allen
- The Canadians (1961) as Chief Four Horns (uncredited)
- Sergeants Three (1962) as Watanka
- Beauty and the Beast (1962) as Bruno
- Tower of London (1962) as Sir Ratcliffe
- California (1963) as Don Francisco Hernandez
- Drums of Africa (1963) as Viledo
- PT 109 (1963) as Lt. Reginald Evans
- McLintock! (1963) as Puma
- Advance to the Rear (1964) as Thin Elk
- Major Dundee (1965) as Sierra Charriba
- Brainstorm (1965) as Dr. Mills
- The Great Sioux Massacre (1965) as Sitting Bull
- The Singing Nun (1966) as Mr. Arlien
- Return of the Gunfighter (1967) as Frank Boone
- Little Jungle Boy (1971) as The Sultan
- Mad Dog Morgan (1976) as Superintendent Winch
- Tim (1981) (also screenplay, director, producer)
- The Battle of Broken Hill (1981) as Himself - Narrator
- The Mango Tree (1982) (writer, producer only)
- Duet for Four (1982) as Al Geisman
- The Return of Captain Invincible (1983) as President
- The Wild Duck (1984) as Wardle
- The Camel Boy (1984) (voice)
- The Adventures of Tom Sawyer (1986) as Injun Joe (voice)
- Death of a Soldier (1986) as Maj. Gen. Sutherland
- The Howling III (1987) as President
- A Dangerous Life (1988) as Stephen W. Bosworth

=== Television ===
- The Lone Wolf (1954) as Suva Polege/Dr. Bill Roche
- You Are There (1953/1955) as Brutus
- Schlitz Playhouse (1954/1955)
- Four Star Playhouse (1955) as Sgt. Gibbons
- Passport to Danger (1956)
- Conflict (1956)
- Broken Arrow (1956) as Gokliya
- Soldiers of Fortune (1956) as Salom
- Wire Service (1957) as Edward Lansing
- The Millionaire (1957) as Mark Jason
- The Adventures of McGraw (1957) as Blake
- Gunsmoke (1957) as Locke
- The O. Henry Playhouse (1957)
- The Adventures of Jim Bowie (1957) as First Officer
- Goodyear Theatre (1957) as Jim Witcher
- The Californians (1958) as Don Manuel Guzman
- Zorro (1958) as Salvador Quintana
- The Frank Sinatra Show (1958) as Paul Dupres
- Climax! (1954/1958) as Wilcher/Eddie/Bert Landon
- "The Rifleman" (1958) S1 E10 as Xavier
- The Silent Service (1958) as Australian Commando Dennis
- Sugarfoot (1958) as Ross Garrett
- Wagon Train (1958) Season 1 Episode 26 as Yellow Robe
- The Adventures of Rin Tin Tin (1959) as Sleeping Dog
- The Third Man as Nick Boles
- Black Saddle as Garnie Starrit
- Wanted: Dead or Alive as Victorio/Captain Manuel Herrera
- Markham (1959) as Largo
- Westinghouse Desilu Playhouse (1959) as Howard
- Gunsmoke (1959) as Indians Wild Hog & Blue Horse (latter the title character)
- Grand Jury (1959) as Freeman
- The Detectives (1960) as Lyman
- Law of the Plainsman (1960) as 'Gentleman' Frank Deegan
- The Texan (1958/1960) as George Brandon/Emory
- Wichita Town (1960) as Kotana
- Men Into Space (1960) as Dr. Morrow
- The Islanders (1960) as Moribus
- Zane Grey Theater (1956-1960) as Gunman/Deputy Charlie Spawn/Miguel/Geronimo
- Michael Shayne (1960) as Leo Gannet
- Hawaiian Eye (1960) as Joe Gordon
- General Electric Theater (1961) as Dick Rogers
- Adventures in Paradise (1961) as Andre Villard
- Maverick (1961) as Chet Whitehead
- Thriller (1961) as Shanner
- The Tall Man (1961) as Harry Young
- The Roaring 20's (1961) as Frankie Delain
- Acapulco (1961) as George Jamison
- Peter Gunn (1961) as Juan Mendoza
- Follow the Sun (1961) as T.J. Conlon
- Lawman (1961) as King Harris
- Frontier Circus (1961) as Michael Smith
- Tales of Wells Fargo (1960-1961) as Hogan/Paul Jennings Kalo
- Laramie (1960-1962) as Governor Loren Corteen/Quinto/Toriano
- Have Gun - Will Travel (1957-1962) as Miguel Rojas/Chief Tamasun (twice)
- 77 Sunset Strip (1962) as Reggie Waddick/Nicky Madrid-Andrew Cornell
- The Rifleman (1958-1962) as Xavier Escobar/Brad Davis/Pete Morgan/Mogollan/Sanchez
- Route 66 (1962) as Phillip Tager
- The Beachcomber (1962) as Ricardo Selas
- Cheyenne (1957-1962) as Strongbow/Col. Rissot/Chato
- Ripcord (1962)
- Rawhide (1959-1964) as Taslatch/Mitla/Sankeno/Richard Goffage/Running Horse
- Rawhide (1961) – Richard Goffage in S3:E20, "Incident of the Boomerang"
- Glynis (1963) as Wellman
- The Dakotas (1963) as Hal Regis
- Perry Mason (1963-1964) as Richard Harris/Jack Mallory
- Temple Houston (1964) as Nat Cramer
- Gunsmoke (1957-1964) as Locke/Wild Hog/Blue Horse/Buffalo Calf
- Profiles in Courage (1965) as John Wilson
- Lassie (1965) as Eddie Burch
- The Alfred Hitchcock Hour (1964-1965) as Hare/Stephen Leslie
- Kraft Suspense Theatre (1965) as Johnny Slato
- Wagon Train (1958-1965) as Yellow Robe/Crazy Bear
- Burke's Law (1965) as Kauffman
- Get Smart (1965) as Naharana
- The Man From U.N.C.L.E. (1966) as Lucienne Bey
- Honey West (1966) as Darza
- Branded (1966) as Chief Crazy Horse
- Daktari (1966) as Patrick Boyle Connors
- Daniel Boone (1964-1966) as Pushta/Raaccuwan
- Batman (1966) as Second Hand Three
- The Wild Wild West (1966) as Bledsoe
- Death Valley Days (1962-1966) as Roy Anthony/Two Horses/Augustine Chacon/Chief Hastele/Frenchy Godey/Horace Stoner
- The Magical World of Disney (1967) as Capt. Blazer
- The Time Tunnel (1966-1967) as Capt. Hotchkiss/Captain
- Rango (1967) as Burning Arrow
- The Road West (1967) as Deacon
- The Rat Patrol (1967) as Sheik
- Tarzan (1967) as Griggs/Findley
- Mission: Impossible (1967) as General Diaz
- Hondo (1967) as Chief Vittoro
- Maya (1968) as Matt Collins
- Voyage to the Bottom of the Sea (1964-1968) as Colonel/Hamid/Gelid
- Riptide (1969) as Wes Lowry/Capt. Bonner
- The Virginian (1963-1970) as Mike McGoff/Alf
- Homicide (1970) as Harold Barrett
- Delta (1970) as Leo Falstone-Green
- The Long Arm (1970) as David Martin
- Division 4 (1970) as Vic Delaney
- The Box (1974) as Narrator
- Matlock Police (1971-1975) as Det. Sgt. Vic Maddern
- Cash and Company (1975) as Jacob Striker
- Power Without Glory (1976) as Dr. Malone/Archbishop Malone
- Mission: Impossible (1989) as Luis Berezan

== Awards and nominations ==
Institution	Year	Category	Work	Result
Australian Film Institute Awards	1978	Best Screenplay, Adapted	The Mango Tree	Nominated
Australia Writers' Guild	1979	Feature Film	Tim	Won
Film Critics Circle of Australia	2000	Special Presentation	—N/a	Won
Penguin Award	1972	Best Leading Drama Talent	Matlock Police	Won
