= The Weatherboard Cathedral =

Poetry collection by Les Murray

- First edition
- Author: Les Murray
- Language: English
- Genre: Poetry collection
- Publisher: Angus and Robertson
- Publication date: 1969
- Publication place: Australia
- Media type: Print
- Pages: 77 pp

The Weatherboard Cathedral (1969) is a poetry collection by Australian poet Les Murray. It is the first collection of poems by Murray as the sole author; he had previously published The Ilex Tree in 1965 in collaboration with Geoffrey Lehmann.

The collection consists of 47 poems, some of which were published in various Australian poetry publications, though most appear in print here for the first time.

== Contents ==
- "Evening Alone at Bunyah"
- "Recourse to the Wilderness"
- "Farewelling Contemporaries"
- "Shorelines"
- "Platypus"
- "The Princes' Land"
- "Ill Music"
- "Windy Hill"
- "Troop Train Returning"
- "Tableau with Academic Figures"
- "Blood"
- "East Sydney"
- "Shelduck Lagoon"
- "Bagman O'Reilly's Curse"
- "Existential Beasts"
- "The Abomination"
- "The Borgia Pope Relates a Painful Incident (for Geoffrey Lehmann)"
- "The Wilderness"
- "Once in a Lifetime, Snow"
- "The Garden Path"
- "The Commercial Hotel"
- "The Merchants' Wheel"
- "The Abortion Scene"
- "Prosper the Commonwealth"
- "Susan the Serpent : A Colonial Fiction"
- "An Absolutely Ordinary Rainbow"
- "The Last Continent"
- "The Count of the Simple Shore"
- "The Incendiary Method"
- "When I Was Alive"
- "The Rock Shelters, Botany Bay"
- "Treeroots and Earth"
- Three Tries at Englynion sequence
  - "The Patristics of Fashion"
  - "Between Two Wars"
  - "A Poet of 1914"
- "One Who Asked, Thinking He Knew"
- "A Walk with O'Connor"
- "If a Pebble Fall"
- "The Barranong Angel Case"
- "The House of Four-X"
- "Senryu"
- "The Canberra Remnant"
- "Working Men"
- "The Ballad Trap"
- "Hayfork Point"
- "The Spheres"
- "The Fire Autumn"

== Critical reception ==
While reviewing the book as a part of a survey of Australian poetry of the time, Ronald Dunlop noted that Murray "is what would have been termed in an age less self-conscious about its literary terminology a poet of the outback. The poetry in his new book, The Weatherboard Cathedral comes directly from his knowledge of and affection for the land and its people. These positive values give his work warmth that could not be achieved by the simple desire to herald the triumph of the good earth over city sin. In his most characteristic poems, ‘Troop Train Returning’, ‘Recourse to the Wilderness’ or ‘The Wilderness’, for example, journeys inland ‘beyond the Divide’ or to ‘the waterless kingdom’ become pilgrimages in search of self and old values."

In his 2010 essay "Art with It's Largesse and Its Own Restraint : The Sacramental Poetics of Elizabeth Jennings and Les Murray", included in the critical anthology Between Human and Divine : The Catholic Vision in Contemporary Literature, edited by Mary R. Reichardt, Stephen McInerney opined that "The Weatherboard Cathedral reveals the many-sidedness of Murray's sacramental poetic. As well as depicting a world saturated with God's presence (a dimension of Murray's work that reached its apotheosis in the 1992 collection Translations from the Natural World), it also shows how the sacramental enlarges to embrace the sacrificial aspects of the human and animal kingdoms."

== See also ==
- 1969 in Australian literature
- 1969 in poetry
