= To the Islands =

1958 novel by Randolph Stow

- First UK edition
- Author: Randolph Stow
- Language: English
- Publisher: Macdonald & Co. (UK); Penguin Books (Australia)
- Publication date: 1958
- Publication place: Australia
- Media type: Print (Hardback, Paperback, Audio-book)
- Pages: 204
- Followed by: Tourmaline

To the Islands is a 1958 novel by Australian author Randolph Stow. It won the Miles Franklin Award for 1958 and the ALS Gold Medal in 1959.

== Plot summary ==
The novel is set in a remote Anglican mission in the Kimberley in the far north of Western Australia.

The protagonist is Heriot - based partially on the figure of Ernest Gribble - the principal chaplain of the mission, who commits an act of violence against an Aboriginal man, and who subsequently disappears into the wilderness.

== Publication history ==
Originally published in England in 1958, and the USA in 1959, the novel was the first novel published by Penguin Australia in 1962. A revised edition appeared in 1981 published by Angus and Robertson. Audio book editions appeared in the 2000s. Text Publishing, in its republishing Australian novels, produced their edition in 2015.

== Reviews ==
On the novel's re-issue in 2014, Suzie Gibson in The Conversation stated that "Although Stow’s novel presents us with challenging social, political and historical issues, it was never denied literary merit. Indeed the power of Stow’s prose is the equal of anyone’s from Patrick White to Christina Stead; it is exquisite in its sparseness, precision and surprising beauty. The frankness and difficulty of the subject matter is counter-balanced by the splendour of Stow’s memorable turns of phrase."

== Awards and nominations ==
- 1958 - winner Miles Franklin Award
- 1959 - winner ALS Gold Medal
