= The Balance of Pain and Other Poems =

1877 Australian poetry collection by Emily Manning

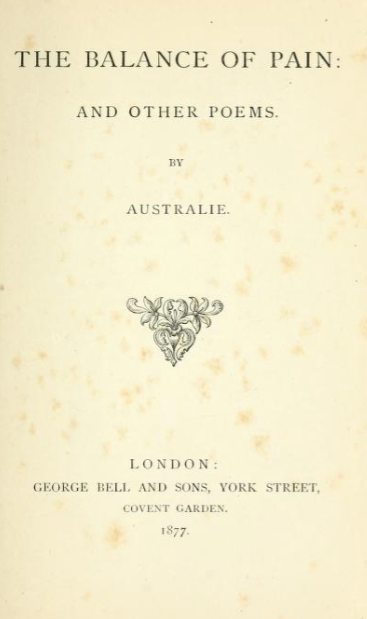
- Title page for The Balance of Pain and Other Poems (1877)
- Author: Emily Manning
- Language: English
- Genre: Poetry collection
- Publisher: George Bell and Sons
- Publication date: 1877
- Publication place: United Kingdom
- Media type: Print
- Pages: 141 pp.

The Balance of Pain and Other Poems is a collection of poems by Australian poet Emily Manning, published by George Bell and Sons in London in 1877.

The collection contains 33 poems from a variety of sources, mainly Australian newspapers.

== Contents ==
- "The Balance of Pain"
- "The Explorer's Message"
- "Two Children and Two Fates"
- "From the Clyde to Braidwood"
- "The Emigrants : A Cantata"
- "Lost in the Bush, or, The Shepherd's Blessing"
- "The Emigrant's Plaint"
- "The Sweeping Tide"
- "The Weatherboard Fall"
- "Bodalla : A Glimpse of England Amid Australian Hills"
- "The Two Beaches : Manly"
- "The Two Selves, or, The Angel and the Demon of the Soul"
- "The Beacon Child, or, The Angel of the Tempest"
- "The Quiet Dust"
- "The Rising Wind"
- "Nearly"
- "Morning, Night and Endless Morning"
- "The Angel's Call"
- "In Memoriam : Commodore Goodenough"
- "A Plea for the Ragged Schools"
- "Funereal Rites"
- "The Buddawong's Crown : A True Parable"
- "Blind Little Joe : The Unconscious Missionary"
- "Mourning and Unmourned"
- "The Old Path and the New : A Serio-Satire"
- "The King's Highway : (A Wide Paraphrase)"
- "The Army of Unknown Martyrs"
- "Evening Hymn at Sea"
- "Good Friday"
- "Easter Eve"
- "Easter Day"
- "Whitsuntide"
- "Watch and Pray"

== Critical reception ==
A reviewer in The Illustrated Sydney News noted that the author "undoubtedly possesses the true poetic instinct" before continuing: "Her poems are characterised by great purity of tone and loftiness of purpose, while many of the pieces breathe a touching sentiment and earnest sympathy for the sufferings and trials that frequently beset the path of humanity."

Reviewing the collection for The Queenslander, a writer commented that the poems showed "considerable power of landscape painting, and keen sensitiveness to all natural beauty."

== See also ==
- 1877 in Australian literature

== Notes ==
The collection was originally published under the poet's pseudonym "Australie", although her true identity was well-known at the time.
