= The Bitter Pill (novel) =

1974 novel by Australian writer A. Bertram Chandler

- Author: A. Bertram Chandler
- Language: English
- Genre: Science fiction
- Publisher: Wren Publishing
- Publication date: 1974
- Publication place: Australia
- Media type: Print
- Pages: 158 pp.
- ISBN: 0858851113

The Bitter Pill (1974) is a science fiction novel by Australian writer A. Bertram Chandler.

The novel is based on an earlier short story by Chandler of the same name.

== Original short story ==
A. Bertram Chandler's science fiction short story "The Bitter Pill" was published in the June 1970 issue of Vision of Tomorrow.

The story won the Australian SF Achievement Award, Best Australian Science Fiction, in 1971.

== Synopsis ==
In a future Australia a powerful government administration, concerned by the growing number of "old" people, tags all over 45 as senior citizens, forcing them to relinquish their jobs and restricting their privileges. They are also given a suicide pill which they can take if life becomes too difficult for them.

== Critical reception ==
In The Sydney Morning Herald reviewer William Noonan found the author's "fertile imagination" helped provide a novel whose "overall result is absorbing".

Writing in SF Commentary 47 reviewer Christine McGowan was not taken with the book, noting that some mainstream (i.e. non-sf) reviewers had found it "appealing". McGowan noted that "dramatic tension is very much lacking" and that the "principal characters are no more cardboard than is usual in most sf".

== Publication history ==
After its original publication in 1974 by Wren Publishing the novel was later reprinted as follows:

- Prologue Books, USA, 2012
- Gateway/Orion, UK, 2015

== Awards ==
- The novel won the Australian Sf Achievement Award for Best Novel in 1975.

== See also ==
- 1974 in Australian literature

== Notes ==
- Speaking to Merv Binns, editor of Australian SF News, some time after the publication of the novel, Chandler expressed his disappointment that the novel had not received either a US or UK publication.
