= The Dream of Wearing Shorts Forever =

1984 poem by Australian poet Les Murray

- by Les Murray
- First published in: The Adelaide Review
- Country: Australia
- Language: English
- Publication date: 8 November 1984
- Lines: 77

"The Dream of Wearing Shorts Forever" (1984) is a poem by Australian writer Les Murray. It was originally published in The Adelaide Review on 8 November 1984, and later included in several of the poet's single-author collections and other poetry anthologies.

== Critical reception ==
An analysis of the poem on the PoetryVerse website noted that by indicating a preference for "shorts over ceremonial or ideological costumes, the speaker links them to rural freedom, holidaying scunge, practical work-gear and an angelic nudity that permits self-forgetfulness and gentle rebellion against formality. The desire is both physical and metaphoric: a return home, a cooling of ambition, and a contemplative, pastoral belonging in an Australian landscape."

In a review of the poet's The Daylight Moon collection for The Canberra Times Mandy Lynch noted that in this poem Murray "humorously celebrates the ordinariness of the great Australian tradition of wearing shorts".

== Publishing history ==
After its initial publication in The Adelaide Review in 1984 the poem was reprinted as follows:

- Selected Poems by Les Murray, Carcanet, 1986
- The Daylight Moon by Les Murray, Angus and Robertson, 1987
- Collected Poems by Les Murray, Heinemann, 1994
- New Selected Poems by Les Murray, Duffy and Snellgrove, 1998
- The Quality of Sprawl : Thoughts about Australia by Les Murray, Duffy and Snellgrove, 1999
- New Selected Poems by Les Murray, Farrar Straus and Giroux, 2000
- Learning Human : New Selected Poems by Les Murray, Carcanet, 2001
- Selected Poems by Les Murray, Black Inc., 2007
- The Puncher & Wattmann Anthology of Australian Poetry edited by John Leonard, Puncher & Wattmann, 2009
- Australian Poetry Since 1788 edited by Geoffrey Lehmann and Robert Gray , University of NSW Press, 2011
- The Best 100 Poems of Les Murray by Les Murray, Black Inc., 2012

The poem was also translated into German in 1996.

== Notes ==
- The full text of the poem is available on the PoemHunter website.

== See also ==
- 1984 in Australian literature
- 1984 in poetry
