= The Dominion (Brunton Stephens poem) =

1877 poem by Australian poet J. Brunton Stephens

- by J. Brunton Stephens
- First published in: The Queenslander
- Country: Australia
- Language: English
- Publication date: 4 August 1877
- Lines: 56

Full text
- The Dominion at Wikisource

"The Dominion" (1877) is a poem by Australian poet J. Brunton Stephens. It is also known by the titles "The Dominion of Australia" and "The Dominion of Australia : A Forecast : 1877".

It was originally published in The Queenslander on 4 August 1877, and was subsequently reprinted in the author's poetry collections and a number of Australian poetry anthologies.

== Critical reception ==
In his volume A History of Australian Literature H. M. Green noted that, in this poem, "eloquence becomes poetry, and no finer poem of its kind has come out of this country."

Writing about the role of poetry as a vehicle for political thought in the late 1800s, Jamie Grant noted that this "poem, written in 1877, was widely regarded as the best, as well as one of the earliest, of all the versified arguments for the coming Federation."

== Publication history ==
After the poem's initial publication in The Queenslander in 1877 it was reprinted as follows:

- The Queenslander, 21 December 1878
- Miscellaneous Poems by J. Brunton Stephens, Watson Ferguson, 1880
- Convict Once and Other Poems by J. Brunton Stephens, George Robertson, 1885
- The Brisbane Courier, 8 August 1899
- An Anthology of Australian Verse edited by Bertram Stevens, Angus and Robertson, 1907
- The Golden Treasury of Australian Verse edited by Bertram Stevens, Angus and Robertson, 1909
- A Book of Queensland Verse edited by J. J. Stable and A. E. M. Kirwood, Queensland Book Depot, 1924
- The Oxford Book of Australasian Verse edited by Walter Murdoch, Oxford University Press, 1924
- An Australasian Anthology : Australian and New Zealand Poems edited by Percival Serle, R. H. Croll, and Frank Wilmot, Collins, 1927
- Poets of Australia : An Anthology of Australian Verse edited by George Mackaness, Angus & Robertson, 1946
- The Queensland Centenary Anthology edited by Val Vallis and R. S. Byrnes, 1959
- From the Ballads to Brennan edited by T. Inglis Moore, Angus & Robertson, 1964
- Bards in the Wilderness : Australian Colonial Poetry to 1920 edited by Adrian Mitchell and Brian Elliott, Nelson, 1970
- A Treasury of Colonial Poetry, Currawong, 1982

== See also ==
- 1877 in Australian literature
- 1877 in poetry
