= The Daylight Moon =

1987 Australian poetry collection by Les Murray

- Author: Les Murray
- Language: English
- Genre: Poetry collection
- Publisher: Angus and Robertson
- Publication date: 1987
- Publication place: Australia
- Media type: Print
- Pages: 66 pp
- Awards: 1988 Adelaide Festival John Bray Poetry Award, winner
- ISBN: 0207155798

The Daylight Moon is a collection of poems by Australian poet Les Murray, published by Angus and Robertson in 1987.

The collection contains 54 poems reprinted from a number of sources and with some being published here for the first time.

It was the winner of the 1988 Adelaide Festival John Bray Poetry Award.

== Contents ==
- "Flood Plains on the Coast Facing Asia"
- "Cumulus"
- "Federation Style on the Northern Rivers"
- "Easter 1984"
- "Physiognomy on the Savage Manning River"
- "The Dream of Wearing Shorts Forever"
- "At the Aquatic Carnival"
- "The Sleepout"
- "Tropical Window"
- "Louvres"
- "The Edgeless"
- "The Drugs of War"
- "Letters to the Winner"
- "The China Pear Trees"
- "The Vol Sprung from Heraldry"
- "The Megaethon: 1850, 1906-29 (for Leo Port)"
- "Fastness"
- "1980 in a Street of Federation Houses"
- "The Milk Lorry"
- "The Butter Factory"
- "Bats' Ultrasound"
- "Roman Cage-Cups"
- "The Lake Surnames"
- "Nocturne"
- "Lotus Dam"
- "At Min-Min Camp"
- "Hearing Impairment"
- "At Thunderbolt's Grave in Uralla"
- "April : Leaf Spring"
- "Infra-Red (for Prof. Fred Hoyle and the IRAS Telescope)"
- "Poetry and Religion"
- "May : When Bounty is Down to Persimmons and Lemons"
- "June : The Kitchens"
- "Inverse Ballad"
- "Relics of Sandy"
- "Joker as Told"
- "July : Midwinter Haircut"
- "August : Forty Acre Ethno"
- "The Climb Down"
- "Writer in Residence (or: Drop One of Your Own)"
- "A Public Figure"
- "The Young Woman Visitor"
- "The Grandmother's Story"
- "The Line"
- "September : Mercurial"
- "Extract from a Verse Letter to Dennis Haskell"
- "Max Fabre's Yachts"
- "October : Freshwater and Salt"
- "The Australia Card"
- "The Man with the Hoe"
- "November : The Misery Cord"
- "December : Infant Among Cattle"
- "January : Variations on a Measure of Burns"
- "Aspects of Language and War on the Gloucester Road"

== Critical reception ==
Reviewing the collection for The Age newspaper Vincent Buckley noted that it had "something of a reborn quality, and something of a revenant one." He attributed this to the poet's decision to return to live in the countryside of his childhood, where the familiar must be seen with "new eyes". Buckley went on to note that Murray has risen to "the challenge with a verve that shows him still the most inventive poet in the country."

In The Guardian UK newspaper, Martin Dodsworth wrote "Murray's style is to be expansively various, flooding his world with light, not singling out this or that for intense attention."

== Publication history ==
After the collection's initial publication in Australia in 1987 it was reprinted as follows:

- 1988, Carcanet, UK
- 1988, Persea Books, USA

== See also ==
- 1987 in Australian literature
