= The Mango Tree (film) =

- Directed by: Kevin James Dobson
- Written by: Michael Pate
- Based on: The Mango Tree by Ronald McKie
- Produced by: Michael Pate
- Starring: Christopher Pate; Geraldine Fitzgerald
- Cinematography: Brian Probyn
- Edited by: John Scott
- Music by: Marc Wilkinson
- Production company: Pisces Productions
- Distributed by: Greater Union
- Release date: 13 December 1977
- Running time: 104 minutes (Australia); 95 minutes (international)
- Country: Australia
- Language: English
- Budget: A$800,000
- Box office: A$1,028,000 (Australia)

The Mango Tree is a 1977 Australian drama film directed by Kevin James Dobson and starring Geraldine Fitzgerald and Sir Robert Helpmann. Lead actor Christopher Pate is the son of actor Michael Pate who also produced and wrote the film. It is based on the book of the same name, by Ronald McKie.

== Plot ==
The film is about Jamie, a young man in his formative teen years, growing up in rural subtropical town of Bundaberg, Queensland, Australia, set around World War I. Jamie, raised by this grandmother, enjoys his life in "Bundy", until the town's reaction to the insanity of a local preacher leads him to leave his hometown for life in the city.

== Cast ==
- Christopher Pate as Jamie Carr
- Geraldine Fitzgerald as Grandma Carr
- Robert Helpmann as the Professor
- Gerard Kennedy as Preacher Jones
- Gloria Dawn as Pearl
- Carol Burns as Maudie Plover
- Barry Pierce as Agnus McDonald
- Diane Craig as Miss Pringle
- Ben Gabriel as Wilkenshaw
- Gerry Duggan as Scanlon
- Jonathan Atherton as Stinker Hatch
- Tony Bonner as Captain Hinkler
- Tony Foley as Private Davis
- Tony Barry as Tommy Smith
- Terry McDermott as Somers
- Jonathan Hardy as Joe Speight

== Production ==
Michael Pate was a neighbour of Robert McKie, who wrote the novel. Pate optioned it and tried to find a writer to adapt it into a screenplay but ended up doing it himself. The budget was raised from the Australian Film Commission, GUO Film Distributors and the Bundaberg Sugar Company; the latter invested a third of the total sum. The budget was originally $650,000 but production of the film was delayed by 12 months by which time inflation meant it had risen to $800,000.

Michael Pate originally wanted to direct the film himself but the AFC did not want him to write, produce and direct, so insisted he find a director. Pate proposed Michael Lindsay-Hogg, son of Geraldine Fitzgerald, who was unable to do it. Bruce Beresford almost directed until the South Australian Film Corporation, who had the director under contract, intervened and prohibited him from making it. Then in February 1977, two months before shooting was to begin, Pate hired Kevin James Dobson

Filming took place in the town of Gayndah, Mount Perry and Cordalba as well as Bundaberg. The shoot went for seven weeks starting April and ending in June.

== Release ==
The Mango Tree enjoyed reasonable success, grossing $1,028,000 at the box office in Australia, which is equivalent to $4,728,800 in 2009 dollars.

Critical reaction was muted, with much criticism falling on the performance of Christopher Pate. However film writer Brian McFarlane later wrote that Geraldine Fitzgerald gave "one of the most luminous performances by an actress in Australian film." The movie achieved only limited sales overseas.

Kevin James Dobson later claimed he felt that the script was never quite right and "one or two performances were a little shonky" but that he has great affection for the movie. There are several different edits of the film available, one by Dobson, one by Pate.

== See also ==
- Cinema of Australia
