= The Quality of Sprawl =

1983 poem by Australian poet Les Murray

- by Les Murray
- Written: 1983
- First published in: True North/Down Under no. 1 1983
- Country: Australia
- Language: English
- Lines: 50

"The Quality of Sprawl" (1983) is a poem by Australian writer Les Murray. It was originally published in the first issue of the literary journal True North/Down Under, and later included in several of the poet's single-author collections and other poetry anthologies.

== Synopsis ==
The poem attempts to describe the various meanings of the word "sprawl" in an Australian context, dealing not only with the geographical aspects but also the personal and the political.

== Critical reception ==
As part of their review of the poet's collection The Quality of Sprawl : Thoughts about Australia, which included this poem, The Complete Review commented that "'sprawl' is something Murray revels in: ambitious yet harmless, wild but generous, often beyond both the pale and all but the wildest imagination."

In their notes on the poem, the Griffin Poetry Prize website stated: "Those objects, landscapes and behaviours that Les Murray suggests exemplify the quality of sprawl might seem disarmingly expansive and deceptively languid at first," giving the poet's examples of country generosity along with the necessity of farming a large property by aeroplane. They continued that while "sprawl seems synonymous with 'easygoing' and 'generous', Murray lets us know in good order that it can be inspired to act at the first hint of bureaucratic indifference or injustice, as the unharmed but likely nervous official with the desk halved by a chainsaw learned quickly enough."

== Publishing history ==
After its initial publication in True North/Down Under in 1983 the poem was reprinted as follows:

- The People's Otherworld: Poems by Les Murray, Angus and Robertson, 1983
- Anthology of Australian Religious Poetry edited by Les Murray, Collins Dove, 1986
- Selected Poems by Les Murray, Carcanet, 1986
- The Vernacular Republic: Poems 1961–1981 by Les Murray, Angus & Robertson, 1988 (second edition)
- The Macmillan Anthology of Australian Literature edited by Ken L. Goodwin and Alan Lawson, Macmillan, 1990
- Australian Poetry in the Twentieth Century edited by Robert Gray and Geoffrey Lehmann, Heinemann, 1991
- Collected Poems by Les Murray, Heinemann, 1994
- Australian Verse : An Oxford Anthology edited by John Leonard, Oxford University Press, 1998
- New Selected Poems by Les Murray, Duffy and Snellgrove, 1998
- The Quality of Sprawl : Thoughts about Australia by Les Murray, Duffy and Snellgrove, 1999
- New Selected Poems by Les Murray, Farrar Straus and Giroux, 2000
- Learning Human : New Selected Poems by Les Murray, Carcanet, 2001
- Seven Centuries of Poetry in English edited by John Leonard, Oxford University Press, 2003
- 100 Australian Poems You Need to Know edited by Jamie Grant, Hardie Grant, 2008
- Macquarie PEN Anthology of Australian Literature edited by Nicholas Jose, Kerryn Goldsworthy, Anita Heiss, David McCooey, Peter Minter, Nicole Moore, and Elizabeth Webby, Allen and Unwin, 2009
- The Penguin Anthology of Australian Poetry edited by John Kinsella, Penguin, 2009
- Australian Poetry Since 1788 edited by Geoffrey Lehmann and Robert Gray, University of NSW Press, 2011

== Notes ==
The full text of the poem is available on the Griffin Poetry Prize website.

== See also ==
- 1983 in Australian literature
- 1983 in poetry
