= Convict Once and Other Poems =

1885 collection of poetry by J. Brunton Stephens

- Author: J. Brunton Stephens
- Language: English
- Genre: Poetry collection
- Publisher: George Robertson
- Publication date: 1885
- Media type: Print
- Pages: 340 pp
- Preceded by: Miscellaneous Poems
- Followed by: The Poetical Works of Brunton Stephens

Convict Once and Other Poems (1885) is a collection of poetry by Australian poet J. Brunton Stephens. Although "highly valued by contemporary critics", Stephens's work is now largely ignored.

The collection consists of 42 poems, "divided into two sections: the long narrative poem 'Convict Once', followed by 'Miscellaneous Poems'."

== Contents ==
- "Convict Once : A Poem"
- "My Chinee Cook"
- "My Other Chinee Cook"
- "To a Black Gin"
- "A Piccaninny"
- "Big Ben, the Alligator"
- "Adelaide Ironside"
- "The Dark Companion"
- "A Brisbane Reverie : March, 1873"
- "Lost Chance"
- "The Squatter's Baccy Famine"
- "The Antipodes"
- "Spirit and Star"
- "A Man and a Brother"
- "Off the Track"
- "The Headless Trooper"
- "King Billy's Skull"
- "Macaulay's New Zealander"
- "The Power of Science"
- "The Story of a Soul"
- "Quart Pot Creek"
- "'Our Hope'"
- "From an Upper Verandah"
- "Opening Hymn"
- "An Australian National Anthem"
- "The Dominion"
- "Nonsuited"
- "The Courtship of the Future : A Prevision : A. D. 2876"
- "On a Fork of Byron's"
- "Cape Byron"
- "For My Sake"
- "The Boy Crusader"
- "The Goths in Campania : Placidia, in the Tent of Adolphus"
- "Marsupial Bill"
- "The Great Pig Story of the Tweed"
- "Drought and Doctrine"
- "In a 'Bus : A Spring Contrast"
- "Once More : 'Intermissa Diu Bella'"
- "The Dominion : 1883"
- "The Angel of the Doves"
- "The Famine in Ireland"
- "Mute Discourse : A Poem"

== Reviews ==
A reviewer in The Australasian had a high opinion of Stephens's work: "...he is one of the, as yet, few Australian singers to whom the word 'poet' may be applied without any impropriety - poet in feeling and poet in expression; various in word and versatile in method; combining the essential gifts of imagination with that qualifying and restraining sense of the humorous which asserts itself with such happy effect in compositions like "My Chinee Cook," the address to a black gin, "A Piccaninny," and "Big Ben.""

The Sydney Morning Herald reviewer thought along similar lines. "Three poets have, so far, lived in Australia, two of whom are dead, while one remains. Others there have been who have made vagrant verses or laboured to succeed in a mission to which they had never been called, but only three who have built for themselves a shrine of poesy in which their memories will live for ever. Gordon went first, wearied of the world in which he had lived, misunderstanding and misunderstood; Kendall next, broken as a reed whose melody had been weak and frail occasionally, but never out of tune; Brunton Stephens remains, and offers us this acceptable and beautiful volume of collected poems which we would exchange for the thinnest book of absolutely new verse."

Tackling the poems themselves, the reviewer in The Australian Town and Country Journal opined: "The versification is generally smooth and more original than that of most of the Australian poets. The poems appear to have been suggested by various circumstances which fell under the author's observance, and they contain many allusions to persons, places, and events pertaining to Australian history, and more especially to the history of Queensland."

== See also ==
- 1885 in Australian literature
- 1885 in poetry
