= Convict Once =

1871 verse novel by J. Brunton Stephens

- by J. Brunton Stephens
- Country: Australia
- Language: English
- Genre: Verse novel
- Publisher: Macmillan
- Publication date: 1871
- Pages: 169 pp

Full text
- Convict Once at Wikisource

Convict Once is a verse novel by Australian poet J. Brunton Stephens.

It was first published in the United Kingdom by Macmillan and later in two of the author's poetry collections, and with extracts in a number of other Australian poetry anthologies.

== Outline ==
The Oxford Literary History of Australia described this verse novel as "a monodrama of passion, guilt and remorse, [that] is narrated by a beautiful ex-convict, Magdalen Power, now a Queensland governess, who seduces the lover of one of her pupils."

== Critical reception ==
Writing about this and other poems by Brunton Stephens in The Bulletin, Alfred George Stephens (no relation) noted: "Brunton Stephens’s qualifications for poetry are energy, a little fancy, a little power of thought not very new or original—the qualifications of his Scottish nation. He lacks imagination and strength of emotion—Poetry’s most essential requisites; he lacks, technically, the finer qualities of Taste; and the Poet in him is hampered by the continual obtrusion of the Pedagogue."

The Oxford Literary History of Australia commented that the poem is "Written in graceful hexameters, the poem has the energy of serious melodrama and contains some memorable lines which express Magdalen Power's struggle with her proud emotional nature and self-imposed discipline and humility."

The Oxford Companion to Australian Literature states: "Heavily ornate, and outmoded in its elevated literary tone, the poem at times conveys an impressive air of gravity and grace."

== Further publications ==
After its initial publication in the UK in 1871 the poem was reprinted as follows:

- Convict Once and Other Poems by J. Brunton Stephens, George Robertson, 1885
- The Poetical Works of Brunton Stephens by J. Brunton Stephens, Angus and Robertson, 1902
- A Book of Queensland Verse edited by J. J. Stable and A. E. M. Kirwood, Queensland Book Depot, 1924
- Silence Into Song : An Anthology of Australian Verse edited by Clifford O'Brien, Rigby, 1968

== See also ==
- 1871 in poetry
- 1871 in literature
- 1871 in Australian literature
- Australian literature
