= Tourmaline (novel) =

Australian novel by Randolph Stow

- First edition (UK)
- Author: Randolph Stow
- Language: English
- Genre: Literary fiction
- Publisher: MacDonald, London
- Publication date: 1965
- Publication place: Australia
- Media type: Print
- Pages: 224 pp
- Preceded by: To the Islands
- Followed by: The Merry-Go-Round in the Sea

Tourmaline (1963) is the fourth novel by Australian writer Randolph Stow.

== Story outline ==
Set in the fictional town of Tourmaline in outback Western Australia, the novel follows the arrival of Michael Random and the impact he has on the community. The town is slowly dying as a result of a combination of drought and the abandonment of its mines. Random preaches the word of God to the town's inhabitants and promises to find water, which stirs the townsfolk to life.

== Critical reception ==
Reviewing the re-issue of the book by Text Publishing, Nicholas Rothwell in The Australian noted: "Alone among Stow’s books, Tourmaline gained a certain reputation with the European intelligentsia: its author was briefly seen as a pioneer of modern storytelling, alongside figures such as Lawrence Durrell and John Fowles. It depicted the same Australia that was becoming known from the paintings of Sidney Nolan and Russell Drysdale: a visual, sensory space."

The critic David Fonteyn saw the work in allegorical terms: "Tourmaline is an ecological allegory in which cultural revitalisation is posited due to an acceptance of, and engagement with, the natural environment despite the death drive that is contained within it. In the novel, the natural environment is figured as a living entity that is feared by the people in the town of Tourmaline."

== See also ==
- 1963 in Australian literature

== Notes ==
- Epigraph: O gens de peu de poids dans la memoire de ces lieux ... (Eng: O ye of little weight in the memory of these places...) from the 1924 poem "Anabase" by Saint-John Perse
- Dedication: For M.C.S.
- Author's note: The action of this novel is to be imagined as taking place in the future. A first draft of Chapter 1 was published in Meanjin, No. 85 (1961).
- Text Publishing re-issued the novel in 2015 as part of their "Text Classics" series, with an introduction by Gabrielle Carey.
