= Lunch and Counter Lunch =

1974 Australian poetry collection by Les Murray

- Author: Les Murray
- Language: English
- Genre: Poetry collection
- Publisher: Angus and Robertson
- Publication date: 1974
- Publication place: Australia
- Media type: Print
- Pages: 61 pp
- Awards: 1975 National Book Council Award for Australian Literature, joint winner
- ISBN: 0207131902

Lunch and Counter Lunch is a collection of poems by Australian poet Les Murray, published by Angus and Robertson in 1974.

The collection contains 30 poems reprinted from a number of sources and with some being published here for the first time.

It was the joint winner of the 1975 National Book Council Award for Australian Literature.

== Contents ==
- "The Mitchells"
- "L'esprit de l'escalier"
- "Pentecostal"
- The Police : Seven Voices, poetry sequence
  - "The Knuckle Garden"
  - "Plainclothes Park"
  - "Discontent, Reading Conan Doyle"
  - "Rostered Duty"
  - "The Lips Move During Anointing"
  - "The Breach"
  - "Sergeant Forby Lectures the Cadets"
- "Aqualung Shinto"
- "Jozsef"
- "Rhymes For a Small Capital"
- "Folklore"
- "The Flying Mural"
- "Thinking About Aboriginal Land Rights, I Visit the Farm I Will Not Inherit"
- "Their Cities, Their Universities"
- "Kiss of the Whip"
- "Escaping Out There"
- "After Lunch"
- "Bikini"
- "On the Wreckage of a Hijacked Airliner"
- "Company"
- "Portrait of the Autist as a New World Driver"
- "Cycling in the Lake Country"
- "Sidere Mens Eadem Mutato : A Spiral of Sonnets for Robert Ellis"
- "The Broad Bean Sermon"
- "The Action"
- "The Edge of the Forest"

== Critical reception ==
In a review of the collection for The Age critic R. A. Simpson noted that Murray "sees things with an original eye." Though the review also notes that the poet "offers too many poems that simply go on and on, and reveal a self-indulgent use of language."

June Webb reviewed the collection for Education : journal of the N.S.W. Public School Teachers Federation commented that "This poetry grows on you. Perhaps all good poetry does. Not putting everything in the shop-window."

== See also ==
- 1974 in Australian literature
