= Australian Commonwealth Party =

Defunct political party in Australia

The Australian Commonwealth Party was formed in Sydney to contest the 1972 federal election, on a platform of wide social and administrative reform. The sole candidate, Max Fabre, sought to stand against William McMahon in the seat of Lowe but his nomination was refused over a deposit technicality. A dramatic eleventh-hour action in the High Court went against Fabre and the party. The party's campaign manifesto was written and authorised by poet Les Murray whose unabashed departure from the goals and language of conventional politics generated widespread publicity and prefigured the later emergence of visionary, environment-oriented parties like the Australian Democrats and Greens. The manifesto announced:

The Australian Commonwealth Party is an entirely new political association, non-authoritarian, non-elitist, bound together by the mutual loyalty and common commitment of members. [The party] represents a rising of sensitivity and a restoration of grace. It seeks to reinstate qualitative values in the world in order to counter and, in the end, overcome the entrenched tyranny of quantity. It is thus the sworn enemy alike of divisive political techniques, of the mass solutions of doctrinaire economics and of rule by threat. As against all these, it espouses the higher pragmatism of vision.

The party went on to make a public declaration that "statecraft, not politics [is] the proper function of government" and urged that Australia "achieve true sovereignty and secure the constitutional appointment by universal franchise of an independent Australian head of state." In a letter to The Bulletin in 1972, Les Murray wrote: "Australia will be a great nation, and a power for good in the world, when her head of state is a part-Aboriginal and her prime minister a poor man. Or vice versa."

Though never formally disbanded, the Australian Commonwealth Party did not contest any other election nor seek party registration under later legislation. Its last public action was a rebuke delivered to prime minister Gough Whitlam in July 1974 over the removal of "Commonwealth" from Australia's paper currency. The open letter, signed by the party's chairman Max Fabre, enquired "Has [the PM] forgotten that Australia was a Commonwealth when the British Empire was in short pants?"

== 1972 manifesto ==
(click to enlarge each page)

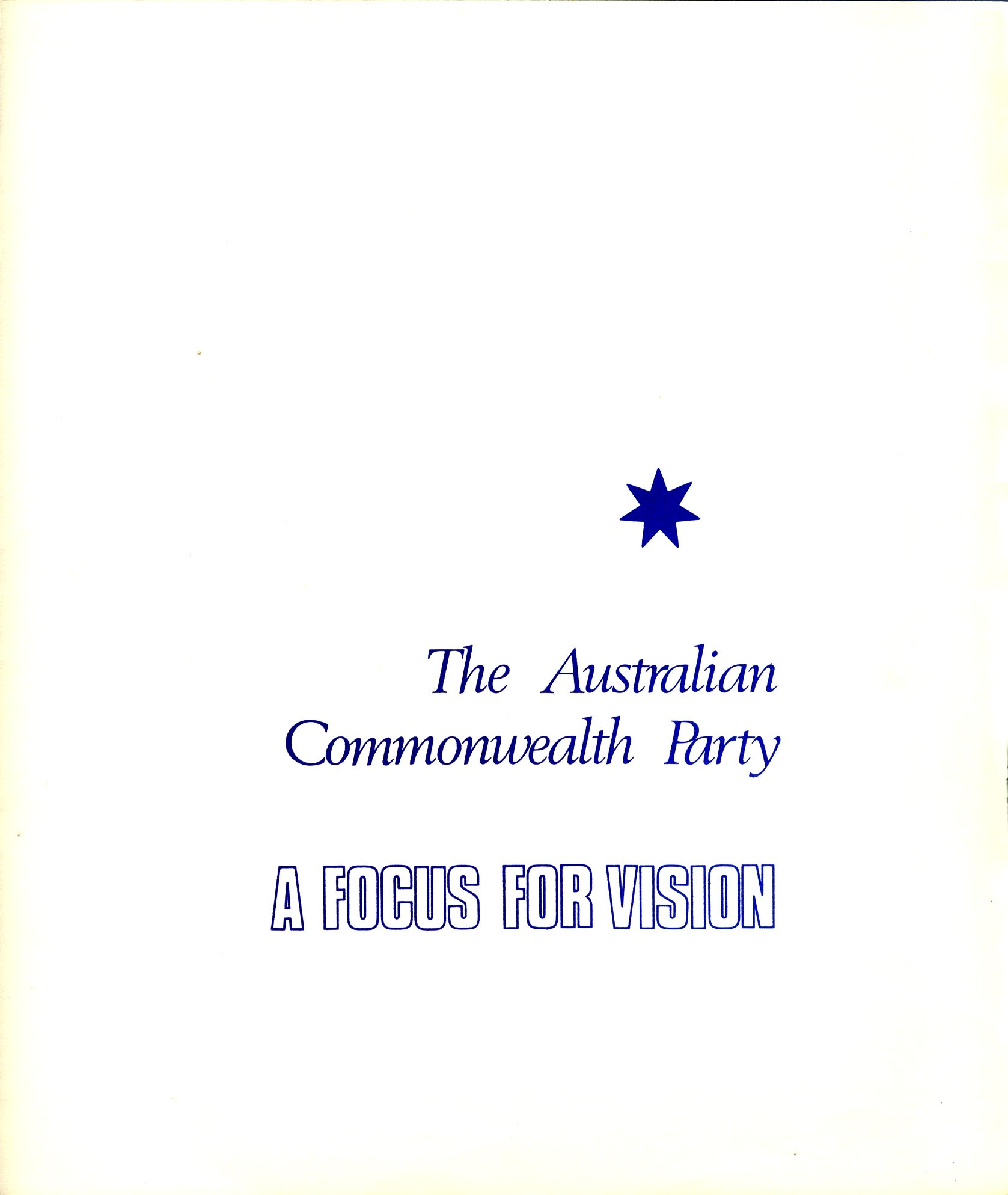

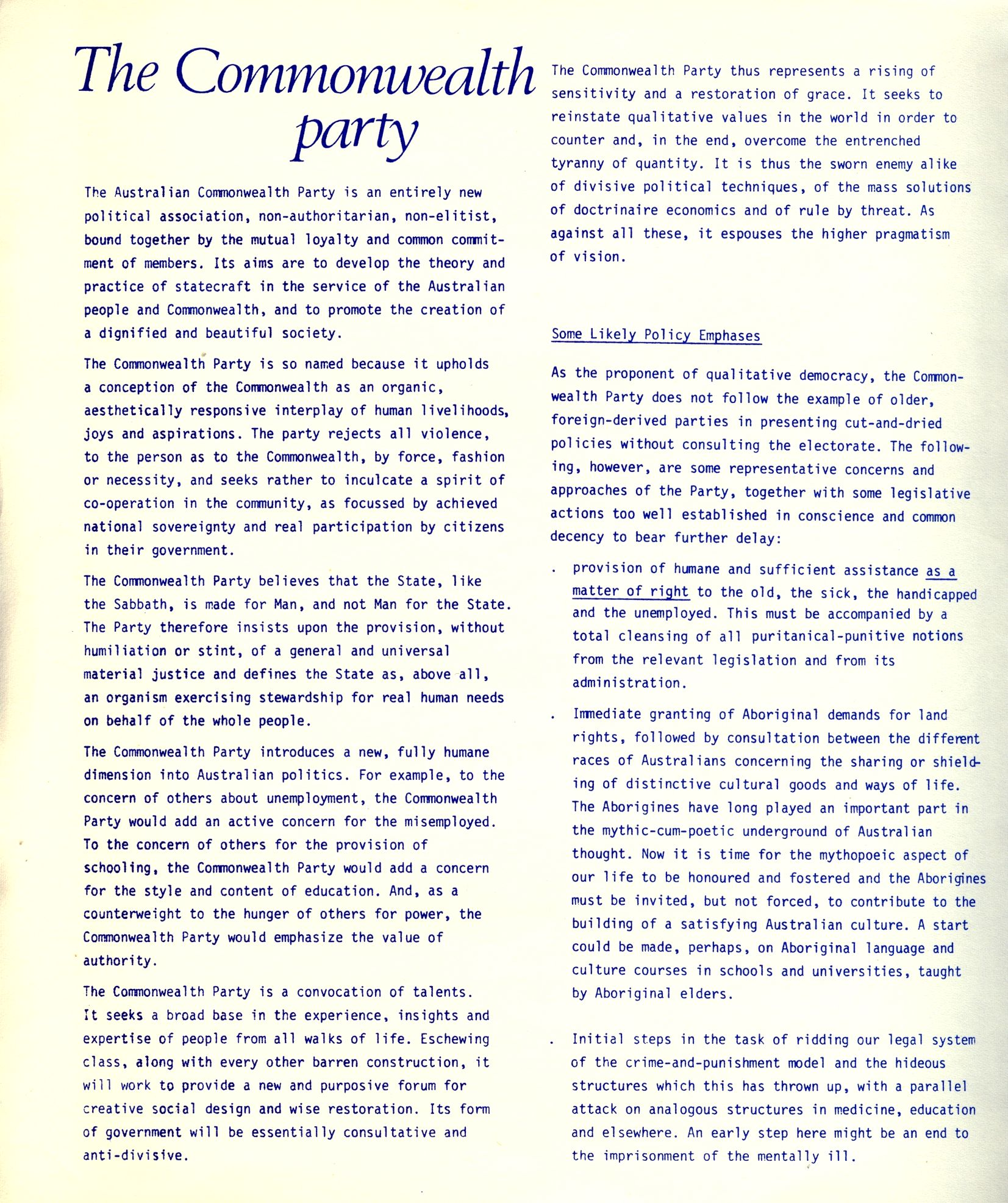

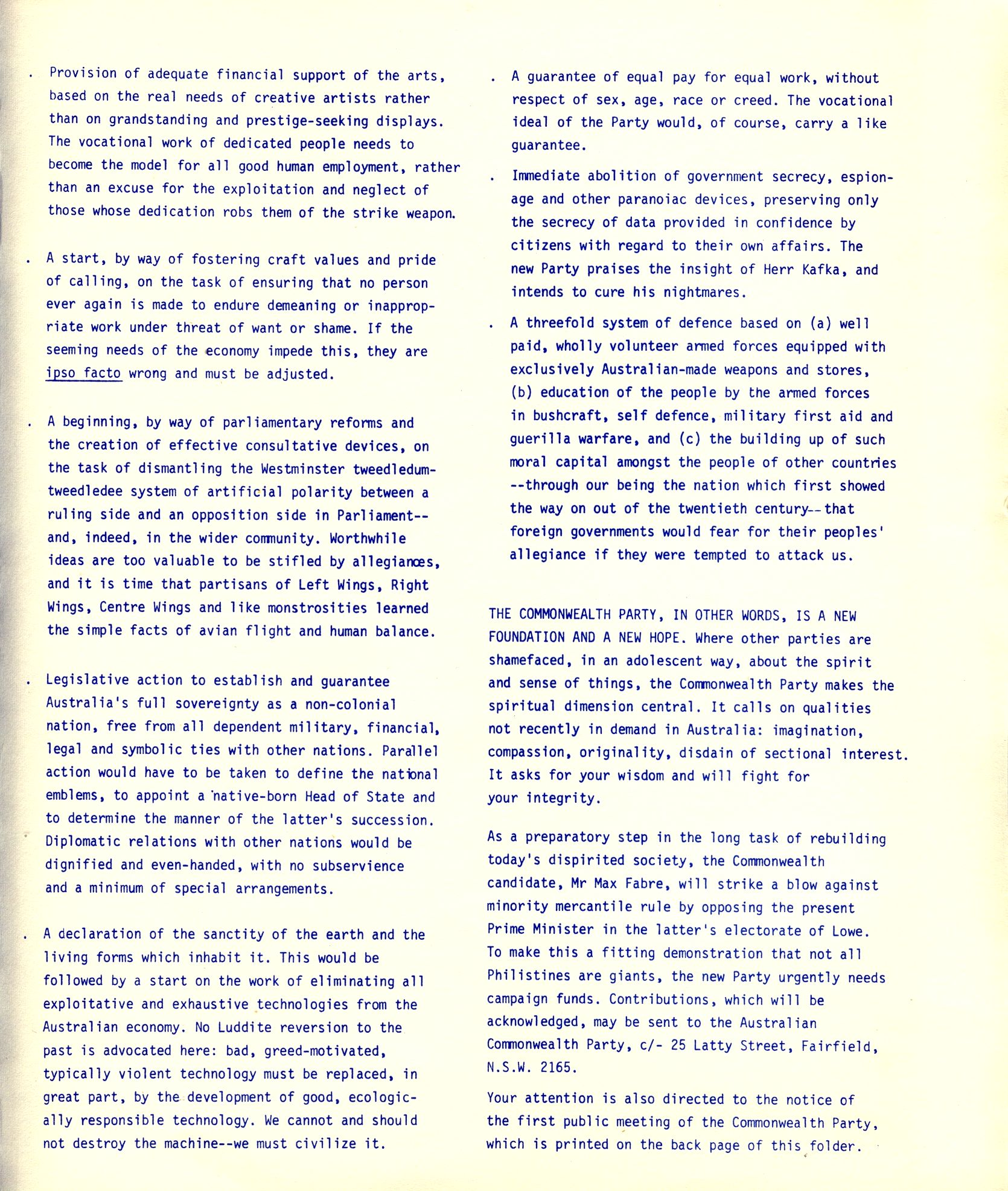

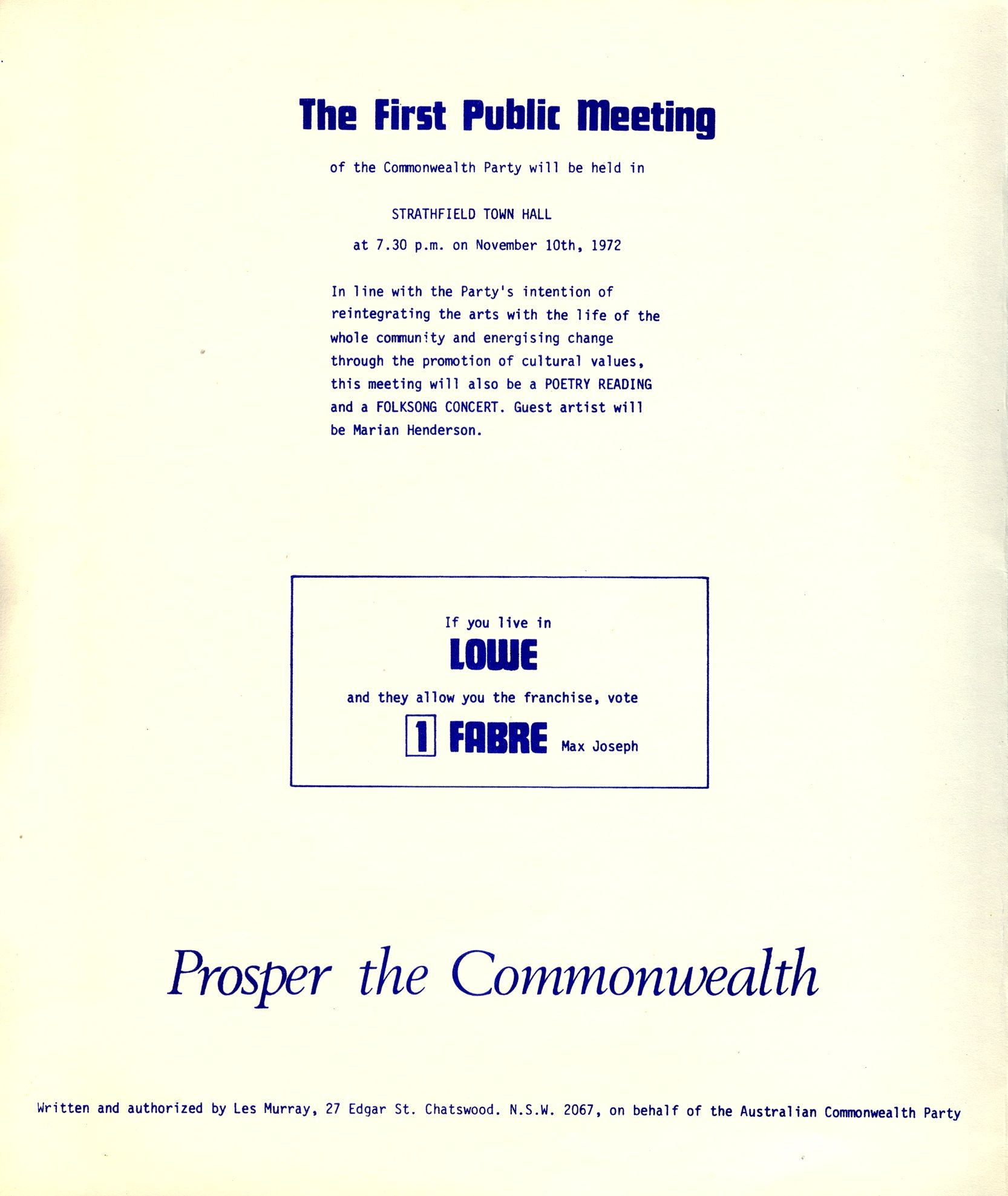
