= The Best 100 Poems of Les Murray =

2012 Australian poetry collection by Les Murray

- Author: Les Murray
- Language: English
- Genre: Poetry collection
- Publisher: Black Inc.
- Publication date: 2012
- Publication place: Australia
- Media type: Print
- Pages: 113 pp
- ISBN: 9781863955843

The Best 100 Poems of Les Murray is a collection of poems by Australian poet Les Murray, published by Black Inc. in 2012.

The collection contains 100 poems reprinted from a many of the poet's previous collections up to this date.

== Contents ==
- "Driving Through Sawmill Towns"
- "An Absolutely Ordinary Rainbow"
- "Kiss of the Whip"
- "The Broad Bean Sermon"
- "The Mitchells"
- "Employment for the Castes in Abeyance"
- "The Buladelah-Taree Holiday Song Cycle"
- "The Future"
- "The Fishermen at South Head"
- "Quintets for Robert Morley"
- "Weights"
- Two Poems in Memory of My Mother, Miriam Murray nee Arnall (Born 13.5.1915, Died 19.4.1951), poetry sequence
  - "Midsummer Ice"
  - "Machine Portraits with Pendant Spaceman"
- "Shower"
- "Time Travel"
- "Louvres"
- "Flood Plains on the Coast Facing Asia"
- "Roman Cage-Cups"
- "Nocturne"
- "The Dream of Wearing Shorts Forever"
- "Poetry and Religion"
- "July : Midwinter Haircut"
- "Cave Divers Near Mount Gambier"
- "The Ballad of the Barbed Wire Ocean"
- "The Tin Wash Dish"
- "Bats' Ultrasound"
- "Lyre Bird"
- "Cattle Ancestor"
- "The Octave of Elephants"
- "The Cows on Killing Day"
- "Spermaceti"
- "The Wedding at Berrico"
- "Dead Trees in the Dam"
- "Late Summer Fires"
- "Corniche"
- "Like Wheeling Stacked Water"
- "It Allows a Portrait in Line-Scan at Fifteen"
- "The Shield-Scales of Heraldry"
- "Burning Want"
- "The Last Hellos"
- "Cotton Flannelette"
- "The Harleys"
- "Dreambabwe"
- "The Instrument"
- "A Deployment of Fashion"
- "A Postcard"
- "Downhill on Borrowed Skis"
- "Sound Bites"
- "The Images Alone"
- "Rooms of the Sketch Garden"
- "Oasis City"
- "The Moon Man"
- "Visitor"
- "Clothing as Dwelling as Shouldered Boat"
- "Jellyfish"
- "A Countryman"
- "In a Time of Cuisine"
- "The Climax of Factory Farming"
- "The Poisons of Right and Left"
- "To One Outside the Culture"
- "The Meaning of Existence"
- "The Hanging Gardens"
- "The Averted"
- "Percepts"
- "Travelling the British Roads"
- "For an Eightieth Birthday"
- "Black Belt in Marital Arts"
- "A Levitation of Land"
- "On the North Coast Line"
- "The Nostril Songs"
- "Death from Exposure"
- "Me and Je Reviens"
- "Pressure"
- "Church"
- "Pastoral Sketch"
- "Birthplace"
- "Panic Attack"
- "Ripe in the Arbours of the Nose"
- "From a Tourist Journal"
- "The Conversations"
- "As Country was Slow"
- "Midi"
- "Observing the Mute Cat"
- "Fame"
- "Cattle-Hoof Hardpan"
- "Phone Canvas"
- "Brown Suits"
- "Eucalypts in Exile"
- "Cherries from Young"
- "High Speed Bird"
- "The Farm Terraces"
- "Rugby Wheels"
- "Hesiod on Bushfire"
- "Port Jackson Greaseproof Rose"
- "The Blame"
- "The Mirrorball"
- "Infinite Anthology"
- "Knotwork Medallion"
- "Natal Grass"

== Critical reception ==
Poet and critic Geoff Page reviewed the collection for The Canberra Times and noted that "having the contents chosen by the author is a desirable strategy and, seemingly, a guarantee of authenticity. Who else but the poet to decide what his or her best 100 poems might be? Of course, posterity is a better judge - but unavailable for comment at this point."

In The Weekend Australian newspaper Fiona Wright commented that "questions of selection are almost inevitable, however, given the volume and variety of Murray's poetry. And it also makes obvious the very different uses to which other anthologies have put his work. The Best 100 Poems of Les Murray, then, may be important because it allows for a selection underscored by no political or literary agenda other than the poet's own. This is Murray as he sees himself: the icon in the mirror, not on the stage."

== Publication history ==
After the collection's initial publication in Australia in 2012 it was reprinted by the same publisher in 2019. It was also translated into German in 2014.

== See also ==
- 2012 in Australian literature
