= The People's Otherworld: Poems =

Australian poetry collection by Les Murray

- Author: Les Murray
- Language: English
- Genre: Poetry collection
- Publisher: Angus & Robertson
- Publication date: 1983
- Publication place: Australia
- Media type: Print
- Pages: 68 pp.
- Preceded by: Flowering Eucalypt in Autumn
- Followed by: Selected Poems

The People's Otherworld: Poems (1983) is a collection of poetry by the Australian writer Les Murray.

== Contents ==
The anthology contains 44 poems, all original.

- "The Craze Field of Dried Mud"
- "The Grassfire Stanzas"
- "Homage to the Launching-Place"
- "First Essay on Interest"
- "The Fishermen at South Head"
- "The Doorman"
- "Fuel Stoppage on Gladesville Road Bridge in the Year 1980"
- "View of Sydney, Australia, from Gladesville Road Bridge"
- "The Flight from Manhattan"
- "The C19-20"
- "The Recession of the Joneses"
- "Quintets for Robert Morley"
- "The New Moreton Bay"
- "Anthropomorphics"
- "The Romantic Theme of Ruins"
- "Bent Water in the Tasmanian Highlands"
- "Equanimity"
- "The Forest Hit by Modern Use"
- "Shower"
- "The Quality of Sprawl"
- "Weights"
- "Midsummer Ice"
- "The Steel"
- "Machine Portraits with Pendant Spaceman"
- "The International Poetry Festivals Thing"
- "Little Boy Impelling a Scooter"
- "Self-Portrait from a Photograph"
- "The Hypogeum"
- "An Immortal"
- "Second Essay on Interest: The Emu"
- "A Retrospect of Humidity"
- "Flowering Eucalypt in Autumn"
- "The Chimes of Niegeschah"
- "The Smell of Coal Smoke"
- "The Mouthless Image of God in the Hunter-Colo Mountains"
- "Time Travel"
- "Exile Prolonged by Real Reasons"
- "Three Interiors"
- "Morse"
- "Late Snow in Edinburgh"
- "Art History: The Suburb of Surrealls"
- "The Dialectic of Dreams"
- "Satis Passio"
- "For a Jacobite Lady"

== Critical reception ==
Writing in The Canberra Times Peter Lugg commented: "This collection will counter the view held by some critics that Murray writes best about the bush. In these new poems. Murray moves deftly from bush to suburb, from the city (often Sydney) to a world of ideas...The poetry is elegant, with a sinewy philosphy [sic] strengthening it."

== Awards ==
- The Age Book of the Year Awards – Fiction (or Imaginative Writing) Award, shortlisted
- ALS Gold Medal 1984, winner
- New South Wales Premier's Literary Awards 1984, winner

== See also ==
- 1983 in Australian literature
