= The Buladelah-Taree Holiday Song Cycle =

1976 poem by Australian poet Les Murray

- by Les Murray
- Written: 1976
- First published in: The Herald
- Country: Australia
- Language: English
- Publication date: 7 September 1976
- Lines: 195

"The Buladelah-Taree Holiday Song Cycle" (1976) is a poem by Australian writer Les Murray. It was originally published in The Herald newspaper on 7 September 1976, and later included in several of the poet's single-author collections and other poetry anthologies.

== Synopsis ==
The poem is written "in an Australian Aboriginal meter (derived essentially from music – clapsticks and didgeridoo – and dance)" and "is based thematically and structurally on R. M. Berndt's translation of the Wonguri-Mandjikai song, 'The Moon-bone Song', from north-eastern Arnhem Land."

The poem describes the annual migration of holiday-makers, during the end of year summer period, to the mid-north coastal region of NSW between Bulahdelah and Taree.

== Critical reception ==
In a review of the poet's collection Ethnic Radio critic Thomas Shapcott called it a poem "of perhaps far-reaching implications. There is an almost Whitmanesque collective and accretive rhetoric."

In his book Reading Australian Poetry Andrew Taylor commented "Murray's attempted fusion of cultures is itself an ideological act, as is his arranging them in order of distinctiveness. In this arrangement urban culture is clearly third best, while rural culture is shown as converging with the Aboriginal. Perhaps, more accurately, Aboriginal culture which was destroyed by white settlement is shown as re-emerging within rural culture".

Reviewing two books by Murray, and in the process providing an overview of the poet's writing career for The New York Review of Books, J. M. Coetzee noted that "Murray has written numbers of poems that are in one way or another of Aboriginal inspiration...The most ambitious of these works is 'The Buladelah-Taree Holiday Song Cycle,' a sequence of thirteen poems celebrating the Christmas period when city folk return to the country to join in family reunions and renew the bond with their natal earth. This song cycle, composed in long lines with a dactylic pulse, shows — triumphantly, I would say — how a modern poet working at a high creative pitch can celebrate the values of ordinary folk while remaining accessible to the ordinary reader."

Critic Jonathan Dunk, writing about Murray's oeuvre after the poet's death, called the poem "uncomplicatedly evil". He explained this by noting that it is "an extremely sophisticated version of [the logic of elimination], it appropriates the cadence and the ideas of Aboriginal culture to describe and praise the white Australian society which tried so hard to eliminate it."

== Publishing history ==
After its initial publication in The Herald in 1976 the poem was reprinted as follows:

- Ethnic Radio by Les Murray, Angus and Robertson, 1977
- The Golden Apples of the Sun : Twentieth Century Australian Poetry edited by Chris Wallace-Crabbe, Melbourne University Press, 1980
- The Vernacular Republic : Poems 1961-1981 by Les Murray, Angus and Robertson, 1982
- Cross-Country : A Book of Australian Verse edited by John Barnes and Brian MacFarlane, Heinemann, 1984
- My Country : Australian Poetry and Short Stories, Two Hundred Years edited by Leonie Kramer, Lansdowne, 1985
- Selected Poems by Les Murray, Carcanet, 1986
- Contemporary Australian Poetry: An Anthology edited by John Leonard, Houghton Mifflin, 1990
- Collected Poems by Les Murray, Heinemann, 1994
- Australian Verse : An Oxford Anthology edited by John Leonard, Oxford University Press, 1998
- New Selected Poems by Les Murray, Duffy and Snellgrove, 1998
- Learning Human : Selected Poems of Les Murray by Les Murray, Duffy and Snellgrove, 2003
- Selected Poems by Les Murray, Black Inc, 2007
- Australian Poetry in the Twentieth Century edited by Robert Gray and Geoffrey Lehmann, Heinemann, 1991
- The Best 100 Poems of Les Murray by Les Murray, Black Inc, 2012

== Notes ==
- You can read the full text of the poem on the "clivejames.com" website.

== See also ==
- 1976 in Australian literature
