= An Absolutely Ordinary Rainbow =

1967 poem by Australian poet Les Murray

- by Les Murray
- Written: 1967
- First published in: The Weatherboard Cathedral
- Country: Australia
- Language: English
- Publication date: 1969
- Lines: 47

"An Absolutely Ordinary Rainbow" (1969) is a poem by Australian writer Les Murray. It was originally published in the poet's collection The Weatherboard Cathedral, and later included in several of the poet's single-author collections and other poetry anthologies.

== Synopsis ==
"A huge crowd collects around a man who starts spontaneously weeping in Martin Place and people reach out to receive 'the gift of weeping.'"

== Critical reception ==
In his review of the poet's collection The Weatherboard Cathedral in The Bulletin Geoffrey Lehmann noted that the poem indicates that to "avoid [weeping] is cowardice as [it is a] natural, instinctive reaction".

On the "LitCharts" website the poem is noted as being "a critique of the suppression of emotion, suggesting that the ability to feel–and to express those feelings–is crucial to being human."

== Publishing history ==
After its initial publication in The Weatherboard Cathedral in 1969 the poem was reprinted as follows:

- Australian Poetry Now edited by Thomas Shapcott, Sun Books, 1970
- Twelve Poets, 1950-1970 edited by Alexander Craig, Jacaranda Press, 1971
- The Penguin Book of Australian Verse edited by Harry Heseltine, Penguin Books, 1972
- Selected Poems : The Vernacular Republic by Les Murray, Angus and Robertson, 1976
- The Golden Apples of the Sun : Twentieth Century Australian Poetry edited by Chris Wallace-Crabbe, Melbourne University Press, 1980
- The Collins Book of Australian Poetry edited by Rodney Hall, Collins, 1981
- The Vernacular Republic : Poems 1961–1981 by Les Murray, Angus and Robertson, 1982
- The World's Contracted Thus edited by J. A. McKenzie and J. K. McKenzie, Heinemann Education, 1983
- Cross-Country : A Book of Australian Verse edited by John Barnes and Brian MacFarlane, Heinemann, 1984
- The Illustrated Treasury of Australian Verse edited by Beatrice Davis, Nelson, 1984
- My Country : Australian Poetry and Short Stories, Two Hundred Years edited by Leonie Kramer, Lansdowne, 1985
- Selected Poems by Les Murray, Carcanet, 1986
- Collected Poems by Les Murray, Heinemann, 1991 (aka The Rabbiter’s Bounty)
- The Faber Book of Modern Australian Verse edited by Vincent Buckley, Faber, 1991
- From the Republic of Conscience : An International Anthology of Poetry edited by Kerry Flattley and Chris Wallace-Crabbe, Aird Books Amnesty International, 1992
- Collected Poems by Les Murray, Heinemann, 1994
- An Anthology of Australian Literature edited by Ch'oe Chin-yong and Cynthia Van Den Driesen, Hansin Munhwasa, 1995
- Killing the Black Dog : Essay and Poems by Les Murray, Federation Press, 1997
- New Selected Poems by Les Murray, Duffy and Snellgrove, 1998
- New Selected Poems by Les Murray, Farrar Straus and Giroux, 2000
- Learning Human : New Selected Poems by Les Murray, Carcanet, 2001
- Selected Poems by Les Murray, Black Inc., 2007
- Harbour City Poems : Sydney in Verse, 1788-2008 edited by Martin Langford, Puncher and Wattmann, 2009
- The Best 100 Poems of Les Murray by Les Murray, Black Inc., 2012
- Love is Strong as Death edited by Paul Kelly, Hamish Hamilton, 2019

== Notes ==
- The full text of the poem is available on the Les Murray archived website.
- In Twelve Poets, 1950-1970 the date 1967 and 'Penarth' is printed after the poem, suggesting that this is the date and place it was written.

== See also ==
- 1969 in Australian literature
- 1969 in poetry
