= The Mitchells (poem) =

1974 poem by Australian poet Les Murray

- by Les Murray
- First published in: Lunch and Counter Lunch
- Country: Australia
- Language: English
- Lines: 14

"The Mitchells" (1974) is a poem by Australian writer Les Murray. It was originally published in the poet's collection Lunch and Counter Lunch with the title "Dedication, Written Last: For the Vernacular Republic", and later included in several of the poet's single-author collections and other poetry anthologies.

== Critical reception ==
Geoff Page in a discussion of Murray's best poems for Sydney Review of Books noted that "Murray is famous for having asserted that the only class is those who speak of class and ‘The Mitchells' is an apt illustration of the argument." He went on to write that the poem is "a well-constructed, well-finished artefact, in much the same way as the pole the two men are about to raise will be well-cut and solidly placed."

== Publishing history ==
After its initial publication in Lunch and Counter Lunch in 1974 the poem was reprinted as follows:

- Cheeries and Quartermasters edited by John Jenkins, Paper Castle, 1975
- Selected Poems : The Vernacular Republic by Les Murray, Angus and Robertson, 1976
- The Vernacular Republic : Poems 1961–1981 by Les Murray, Angus and Robertson, 1982
- Anthology of Australian Religious Poetry edited by Les Murray, Collins Dove, 1986
- Selected Poems by Les Murray, Carcanet, 1986
- The Faber Book of Modern Australian Verse edited by Vincent Buckley, Faber, 1991
- The Penguin Book of Modern Australian Poetry edited by John Tranter and Philip Mead, Penguin, 1991
- Collected Poems by Les Murray, Heinemann, 1991 (aka The Rabbiter's Bounty)
- Collected Poems by Les Murray, Heinemann, 1994
- The Oxford Book of Modern Australian Verse edited by Peter Porter, Oxford University Press, 1996
- Family Ties : Australian Poems of the Family edited by Jennifer Strauss, Oxford University Press, 1998
- New Selected Poems by Les Murray, Duffy and Snellgrove, 1998
- New Selected Poems by Les Murray, Farrar Straus and Giroux, 2000
- Learning Human : New Selected Poems by Les Murray, Carcanet, 2001
- The Canberra Times, 7 February 2004
- 80 Great Poems from Chaucer to Now edited by Geoff Page, University of NSW Press, 2006
- 60 Classic Australian Poems edited by Geoff Page, University of NSW Press, 2009
- The Best 100 Poems of Les Murray by Les Murray, Black Inc., 2012
- Love is Strong as Death edited by Paul Kelly, Hamish Hamilton, 2019

The poem was also translated into German in 1996.

== Notes ==
- The full text of the poem is available as part of the OpenLibrary's digitised version of Collected Poems (aka The Rabbiter's Bounty).

== See also ==
- 1974 in Australian literature
- 1974 in poetry
