= The Broad Bean Sermon =

1974 poem by Australian poet Les Murray

- by Les Murray
- First published in: The Sydney Morning Herald
- Country: Australia
- Language: English
- Publication date: 6 April 1974
- Lines: 27

"The Broad Bean Sermon" (1974) is a poem by Australian writer Les Murray. It was originally published in The Sydney Morning Herald on 6 April 1974, and later included in several of the poet's single-author collections and other poetry anthologies.

== Critical reception ==
In a survey of Murray's poetry for The Sydney Morning Herald in 1979 Glen Cassidy noted three major streams in the poet's work. The first of these was "the exploration of the widening cultural gap between city and country". The second stream was "the religious dimension of everyday life, as can be seen in the early poems like 'Spring Hall' and 'Driving Through Sawmill Towns' and in the more recent 'The Broad Bean Sermon'." The third of Cassidy's streams lies "in the language of the poems".

An analysis of the poem on the PoetryVerse website called it "A sermon without belief that still feels holy". The analysis then continued: "The poem's central trick is that it builds a religious vocabulary out of garden matter, then insists on a strange contradiction: the bean patch is a church that has 'without belief'."

Geoff Page in a discussion of Murray's best poems for Sydney Review of Books noted that it is "clearly a religious poem. Nine long-lined tercets celebrate human diversity, via an extended metaphor consisting of dozens of smaller metaphors. In public readings of this poem I have heard its author joke blithely about ‘human beans’ by way of introduction."

Discussing the poem for The Conversation website David McCooey called it a poem of "praise", going on to note that it "fuses the material and spiritual worlds, physical and ethical forms of health, the religious and the secular, the ordinary and the transcendent...As a poem of praise (another form associated with religious discourse), it traffics in an emotion not often found in contemporary poetry: happiness."

== Publishing history ==
After its initial publication in The Sydney Morning Herald in 1974 the poem was reprinted as follows:

- Lunch and Counter Lunch by Les Murray, Angus & Robertson, 1974
- Gesture of a Hand edited by David Malouf, Rinehart and Winston, 1975
- Selected Poems : The Vernacular Republic by Les Murray, Angus and Robertson, 1976
- The Vernacular Republic : Poems 1961–1981 by Les Murray, Angus and Robertson, 1982
- The Younger Australian Poets edited by Geoffrey Lehmann and Robert Gray, Hale and Iremonger, 1983
- The Illustrated Treasury of Australian Verse edited by Beatrice Davis, Nelson, 1984
- The Australian Year : The Chronicle of Our Seasons and Celebrations by Les Murray, Angus and Robertson, 1985
- Selected Poems by Les Murray, Carcanet, 1986
- Australian Poetry in the Twentieth Century edited by Robert Gray and Geoffrey Lehmann, Heinemann, 1991
- The Faber Book of Modern Australian Verse edited by Vincent Buckley, Faber, 1991
- The Penguin Book of Modern Australian Poetry edited by John Tranter and Philip Mead, Penguin, 1991
- Collected Poems by Les Murray, Heinemann, 1994
- The Oxford Book of Modern Australian Verse edited by Peter Porter, Oxford University Press, 1996
- Australian Verse : An Oxford Anthology edited by John Leonard, Oxford University Press, 1998
- New Selected Poems by Les Murray, Duffy and Snellgrove, 1998
- New Selected Poems by Les Murray, Farrar Straus and Giroux, 2000
- Learning Human : New Selected Poems by Les Murray, Carcanet, 2001
- Selected Poems by Les Murray, Black Inc., 2007
- The Puncher & Wattmann Anthology of Australian Poetry edited by John Leonard, Puncher & Wattmann, 2009
- Australian Poetry Since 1788 edited by Geoffrey Lehmann and Robert Gray , University of NSW Press, 2011
- The Best 100 Poems of Les Murray by Les Murray, Black Inc., 2012

The poem was also translated into German in 1996.

== See also ==
- 1974 in Australian literature
- 1974 in poetry
