= Randolph Stow =

Australian writer (1935–2010)

- Born: Julian Randolph Stow; 28 November 1935; Geraldton, Western Australia
- Died: 29 May 2010 (aged 74); Harwich, Essex, England
- Other name: Mick
- Education: University of Western Australia
- Writing career
- Notable works: To the Islands (1958); Tourmaline (1963); The Merry-Go-Round in the Sea (1965)
- Notable awards: Miles Franklin Award (1958); Patrick White Award (1979)

Julian Randolph Stow (28 November 1935 – 29 May 2010) was an Australian-born writer, novelist and poet.

== Early life ==
Born in Geraldton, Western Australia, Randolph Stow was the son of Mary Campbell Stow née Sewell and Cedric Ernest Stow, a lawyer.

Stow attended Geraldton Primary and High schools, Guildford Grammar School, the University of Western Australia, and the University of Sydney. During his undergraduate years in Western Australia he wrote two novels and a collection of poetry, which were published in London by Macdonald & Co. He taught English literature at the University of Adelaide, the University of Western Australia and the University of Leeds.

== Career ==
He also worked on an Aboriginal mission in the Kimberley, which he used as background for his third novel To the Islands. Stow further worked as an assistant to an anthropologist, Charles Julius, and as a cadet patrol officer in the Trobriand Islands off the east coast of New Guinea. In the Trobriands he suffered a mental and physical breakdown that led to his repatriation to Australia. Twenty years later, he used these last experiences in his novel Visitants.

Stow first visited England in 1960 and lived there for a few years, although he returned several times to Australia. Tourmaline, his fourth novel, was completed in 1962 while he taught in Leeds. In 1964 and 1965 he travelled in North America on a Harkness Fellowship, including a sojourn in Aztec, New Mexico, during which he wrote one of his best known novels, The Merry-Go-Round in the Sea. While living in Perth (WA) in 1966 he wrote his popular children's book Midnite.

From 1969 to 1981 he lived at East Bergholt in Suffolk in England, his ancestral county, and he used traditional tales from that area to inform his novel The Girl Green as Elderflower. The last decades of his life he spent in nearby Harwich, the setting for his final novel The Suburbs of Hell. He last visited Australia in 1974.

Stow died in England on 29 May 2010 of a pulmonary embolism, having been diagnosed with liver cancer.

== The Girl Green as Elderflower (1980) ==
The Girl Green as Elderflower is often considered to be closely linked to Stow's life. After dealing with a bout of malaria in Papua New Guinea, he moved to East Bergholt in Suffolk in England from 1969 to 1981, his ancestral county, and he used traditional tales from that area, many of which he translated from Latin himself, to inform his novel. The regional stories Stow used for the novel were collected by William of Newburgh, Gervase of Tilbury, Gerald the Welshman, Ralph Coggeshall, Roger Howden, and Walter Map. Many of the characters in the novel are based on Stow's friends. He conducted research in advance of publication for several years. In 1978, he and John Constable's great-great-grandson were in a serious car accident, which finally spurred Stow to begin writing the novel. On New Year's Day 1979, he began writing and finished thirty-two days later.

Stow was influenced by the focus on particular places in English Victorian literature and set the entire novel in Suffolk. Literary scholar Melanie Duckworth has claimed that, in The Girl Green as Elderflower, Suffolk is not mere setting, but rather a textured and historied place. Although he kept the location static, the novel takes place over a variety of time periods. It focuses one place throughout and across time. Stow engages in what Duckworth calls "Australian medievalism," drawing connections between the Middle Ages and postcolonial Australia and Papua New Guinea. This connection is most clear between the medieval legend of green children and the novel's titular Welsh "girl green." Stow draws a parallel between greenness and strangeness in the medieval period to the aftermath of contemporary colonial projects. Ultimately, according to Duckworth, it is trauma (both for the main character, Crispin Clare, and the colonial/postcolonial places he inhabits) that draws the narrative out of and across time. Destabilization of time is positioned as a means of recovery, particularly for Clare.

In March 2019, La Mama Courthouse Theatre in Melbourne, Australia adapted The Girl Green as Elderflower into a musical. It was adapted by Richard Davies and directed and orchestrated by Sara Grenfell.

== Awards and legacy ==
His novel To the Islands won the Miles Franklin Award for 1958. He was awarded the Patrick White Award in 1979. As well as producing fiction, poetry, and numerous book reviews for The Times Literary Supplement, he also wrote libretti for musical theatre works by Peter Maxwell Davies.

A considerable number of Randolph Stow's poems are listed in the State Library of Western Australia online catalogue with indications where they have been anthologised. Australian publisher Text has recently republished many of Stow's novels.

== Personal life and family ==
Julian Randolph Stow's paternal grandfather was Francis Leslie Stow, a Crown Solicitor of Western Australia. Stow's great-grandfather was Randolph Isham Stow, a judge on the Supreme Court of South Australia and Attorney-General of South Australia; a great-great-uncle, Jefferson Stow was prominent as an explorer of northern Australia, and Stow's great-great-grandfather, the Rev. Thomas Quinton Stow, was a pioneering Congregational minister in South Australia. The Stow family was from Suffolk, where they had owned land for several generations before Thomas Stow was appointed the colonial missionary to South Australia by the London Colonial Missionary Society in 1836. In 1837, they relocated to South Australia. After Thomas Stow's death, the Stow Memorial Church was constructed in his honor. His wife, Elizabeth Randolph Eppes, was American and her mother was Thomas Jefferson's first cousin. The Stow lineage can be traced back to the Plantagenets and William the Conqueror.

Stow's mother's family settled in Australia in the 1830s and were some of the earliest to arrive. Her great-grandfather, George Sewell, arrived in Australia in 1835; soon after, the rest of his family relocated from Essex to Australia. Sewell eventually moved from Perth to Geraldton, where his descendants remained. Stow grew up very interested in the traditional stories and histories of the region.

A deeply private person, Stow's life was dogged at times by loneliness and depression (including two suicide attempts), probable alcoholism, an addiction to prescription drugs, and a struggle to come to terms with his homosexuality in a time when it was oppressed.

== Awards list ==
- Australian Literature Society gold medal, 1957, 1958
- 1958 Miles Franklin Literary Award
- Britannica–Australia award, 1966
- Grace Leven Prize, 1969
- 1979 Patrick White Award
- 1989 The Randolph Stow Young Writers Award was established in his honour to encourage school students in the Geraldton region of Western Australia to write.

== Selected works ==
=== Novels ===
- A Haunted Land (1956)
- The Bystander (1957)
- To the Islands (1958) (revised in 1982)
- Tourmaline (1963)
- The Merry-Go-Round in the Sea (1965)
- Visitants (1979)
- The Girl Green as Elderflower (1980)
- The Suburbs of Hell (1984)

=== Poetry ===
- Act One (1957)
- Outrider: Poems 1956–1962 (1962)
- A Counterfeit Silence: Selected Poems (1969)
- The Land's Meaning: New Selected Poems, ed. John Kinsella

=== Children's ===
- Midnite: The Story of a Wild Colonial Boy 1967

=== Musical theatre ===
- Eight Songs for a Mad King 1969, libretto
- Miss Donnithorne's Maggot 1974, libretto

=== Selected list of poems ===
Title	Year	First published	Reprinted/collected in
"The Land's Meaning"	1962	Australian Poetry 1962 edited by Geoffrey Dutton	Outrider : Poems, 1956–1962 by Randolph Stow, illustrated by Sidney Nolan, MacDonald, 1962, pp. 20–21
