= Emily Manning =

Australian journalist and writer (1845–1890)

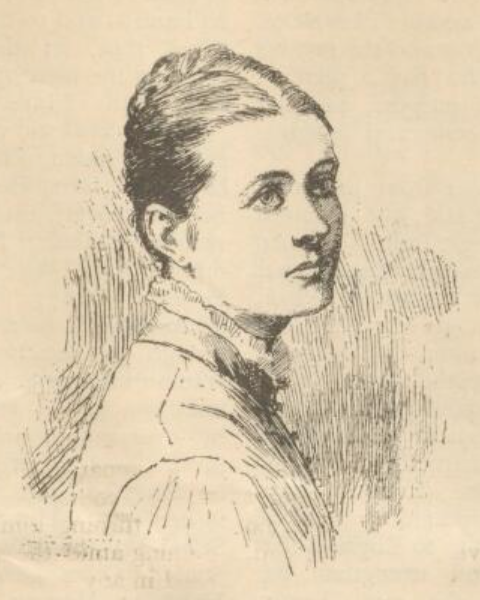
- Born: 13 May 1845; Sydney, New South Wales
- Died: 25 August 1890 (aged 45); Sydney, New South Wales
- Spouse: Henry Heron (m. 1873)
- Writing career
- Pen name: Australie
- Notable work: The Balance of Pain and Other Poems

Emily Matilda Manning (13 May 1845 – 25 August 1890), also known by her pen name Australie, was an Australian journalist and writer. Manning was born into an upper-class family in Sydney in 1845. She began her writing career in England in the late 1860s, where she wrote for The Monthly Packet and Golden Hours. After returning to Australia in the early 1870s, she became a regular contributor to poetry, journalism, literary criticism, and fiction to Australian newspapers. In 1877 she published her best-known work, a collection of poetry titled The Balance of Pain and Other Poems. She spent time employed by The Illustrated Sydney News and authored the women's column for The Sydney Morning Herald between 1888 and 1889. Manning died of pneumonia in 1890 at the age of 45.

== Life ==
Emily Matilda Manning was born in Sydney on 13 May 1845. She was the daughter of the lawyer and politician William Manning and his wife Emily Anne (née Wise). She was educated at a private school and was mentored by the educator John Woolley, who encouraged her interest in literature. At about nineteen, she had a brief romantic relationship with the book collector David Scott Mitchell.

Manning moved to England in 1864 and began contributing to periodicals, including The Monthly Packet (a publication for teenage girls edited by Charlotte Mary Yonge) and Golden Hours. After returning to Australia in the early 1870s, she published in the Town and Country Journal, The Sydney Morning Herald, and The Sydney Mail. She was briefly employed by The Illustrated Sydney News. She typically wrote anonymously or under the pen name "Australie".

Manning married a lawyer named Henry Heron on 22 December 1873 in Darlinghurst; they eventually had at least six children. (Note: Sources differ on whether Manning had six or seven children.) In 1877 Manning published a volume of poetry titled The Balance of Pain and Other Poems in London. The collection, which included a number of poems that she had previously published in Australian newspapers as well as a set of hymns, was positively received by critics. Manning continued to contribute book reviews, fiction, poetry, and journalism to Australian newspapers. Her writing included at least two serial novels: Cupid on a Swiss Tour and The Story of a Royal Pendulum. From 1888 to 1889 Manning was the primary author of the women's column for The Sydney Morning Herald, and in 1889 she was the associate editor of The Illustrated Sydney News.

Manning died on 25 August 1890 of pneumonia in Sydney. Upon her death the newspaper editor William Curnow described her as the foremost of Australia's female authors, writing that "our scanty literature was made richer by her labors, and will be poorer for her death". An obituary in The Sydney Morning Herald praised her work as a journalist, saying that she displayed "incisiveness and earnestness, an intense interest in those public questions that appealed to her, and much sterling honesty of purpose".

== Poetry ==
Manning wrote multiple forms of poetry, including hymns, cantatas, and dramatic poems. The literary historian Patricia Clarke describes Manning's poetry as featuring "great purity of tone and loftiness of purpose". She suggests that it displays an empathetic understanding of human suffering and a notable degree of intellectual rigour. To the literary scholar Rosalind Smith, her poetry is distinguished by its "lyrical and detailed descriptions of the Australian landscape, its intellectual ambition, and its formal sophistication". Elizabeth Webby, a scholar of Australian literature, describes her as "the first Australian-born woman to make a poetic mark". Manning's poetry often explored religious themes and depicted experiences of struggle and self-sacrifice, as well as exploring gender roles and spirituality in the Australian colonies. Some of her poetry included critique and satire of colonial politics alongside examinations of spiritualism, rationalism, and feminism. Her poetry is known for its depictions of the Australian natural landscape, which she often combined with religious themes and motifs.

Manning's most significant work is the 1877 volume The Balance of Pain and Other Poems. In the collection she explores the tension between the Christian belief in a loving God and the ordinary struggles that humans face. The collection's opening poem, "The Balance of Pain", is a theatrical dialogue between a clairvoyant woman named Agatha and her husband Theodore. Theodore complains about the difficulty of his life, while Agatha helps him reach acceptance by describing the suffering that others face. To the poetry scholar Katie Hansord, the poem draws links between religion, motherhood, and social reform by assigning sceptical, socially critical rationalism to a male voice and confining religious authority to a female voice. Hansord adds that the poem reflects the intertwined nature of debates over spiritualism, secularisation, and evolving gender roles during Manning's era. The collection also includes a cantata titled "The Emigrants" about newly arrived working-class English immigrants in Australia. Smith writes that the collection defends the notion that women should play a more active and assertive role as moral guides within the private sphere and as helpers of the needy in the public sphere.

== Bibliography ==
=== Poetry ===
- The King's Highway (1872)
- Evening Hymn at Sea (n.d.)
- The Balance of Pain and Other Poems (1877)
