= Ronald McKie =

Australian novelist (1909–1991)

- Born: Ronald Cecil Hamlyn McKie; 11 December 1909; Toowoomba, Queensland, Australia
- Died: 8 May 1991 (aged 81)
- Occupation: Novelist
- Writing career
- Period: 1940–1988
- Notable work: The Mango Tree
- Notable awards: Miles Franklin Award, 1974

Ronald Cecil Hamlyn McKie (11 December 1909 – 8 May 1991) was an Australian novelist. He was born on 11 May 1909 in Toowoomba, Queensland. After receiving his education at the Brisbane Grammar School and the University of Queensland, he worked as a journalist on newspapers in Melbourne, Sydney, Singapore, and China. He served in the AIF during World War II from 1942 to 1943, following which he served as war correspondent for several Australian and UK newspapers. After the war he worked for Sydney's Daily Telegraph. McKie died from kidney disease on 8 May 1991 in Canterbury, Melbourne, Australia.

== Awards ==
- Miles Franklin Award, 1974, and FAW Barbara Ramsden Award (joint winner 1974) for The Mango Tree.

== Bibliography ==
The Australian Dictionary of Biography references a biography and cites other references.

=== Novels ===
- The Mango Tree (1974)
- The Crushing (1977)
- Bitter Bread (1978)

=== Autobiography ===
- Bali (1969)
- We Have No Dreaming (1988)

=== Non-fiction ===
- This Was Singapore (1947)
- Proud Echo (1953)
- The Survivors (1953)
- The Heroes (1960)
- The Emergence of Malaysia (1963)
- Malaysia in Focus (1964)
- The Company of Animals (1966)
- Singapore (1972)
- Echoes from Forgotten Wars (1980)
