= Christopher Pate =

Australian actor

- Born: California, USA
- Occupation: Actor
- Father: Michael Pate

Christopher Pate is an Australian actor. He was nominated for the 1977 AFI Award for Best Actor in a Supporting Role for his role in Raw Deal.

In 1966, he starred in the television Western Gunsmoke as Curtis in S12E8 "The Whispering Tree". Pate had a regular role in the early 1970s on the TV series Bellbird. In 1977 he played the lead role in The Mango Tree, which was written and produced by his father Michael Pate. He has appeared on stage in such musicals as Hair and Little Shop of Horrors and played in the original Australian production of Godspell.
