= The Merry-Go-Round in the Sea =

1965 novel written by Randolph Stow

- First edition
- Author: Randolph Stow
- Language: English
- Genre: Literary fiction
- Publisher: MacDonald, London
- Publication date: 1965
- Publication place: Australia
- Media type: Print
- Pages: 283pp
- Preceded by: Tourmaline
- Followed by: Visitants

The Merry-Go-Round in the Sea (1965) is a novel by Australian writer Randolph Stow.

== Story outline ==
Set in Geraldton, Western Australia after World War II the novel follows the story of a boy (Rob Coram) and his cousin Rick. The book begins in 1941 when Rob is six and his idol, Rick, is sent off to war. By the time Rick has returned after spending time as a prisoner of war Rob's view of the world has changed markedly and his childhood has ended.

== Critical reception ==
In a review in The Canberra Times in 1972, Maurice Dunlevy called it "not so much a novel as a lyric poem...The Merry-Go-Round in the Sea is a beautiful book, a novel full of controlled evocative prose, a haunting sense of place, and a wonderfully consistent structure of imagery."

In a survey of the author's work for Australian Book Review in 2009, Tony Hassall has no doubts about the novel's worth: "The book captures the contradictory feelings of its author as he looks back on a golden childhood with fierce nostalgic longing, while at the same time seeing it as transient and irrevocably separate from mature experience... In its sensitive exploration of Rob’s reluctant progression into a world of divided allegiances, The Merry-Go-Round in the Sea stands alongside earlier Australian classics like Henry Handel Richardson’s The Fortunes of Richard Mahony and Martin Boyd’s Lucinda Brayford."

== See also ==
- 1965 in Australian literature
