= Les Murray (poet) =

Australian poet and critic (1938–2019)

Les Murray AO
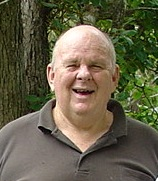
- Murray in 2004
- Born: 17 October 1938; Nabiac, New South Wales, Australia
- Died: 29 April 2019 (aged 80); Taree, New South Wales, Australia
- Education: Taree High School, University of Sydney
- Occupations: Writer, poet
- Political party: Australian Commonwealth Party (1972–1974)
- Spouse: Valerie Morelli (m. 1962)
- Children: 5

Leslie Allan Murray (17 October 1938 – 29 April 2019) was an Australian poet, anthologist and critic. His career spanned over 40 years and he published nearly 30 volumes of poetry as well as two verse novels and collections of his prose writings.

Translations of Murray's poetry have been published in 11 languages: French, German, Italian, Catalan, Spanish, Norwegian, Danish, Swedish, Hindi, Russian, and Dutch. Murray's poetry won many awards and he is regarded as "the leading Australian poet of his generation". He was rated in 1997 by the National Trust of Australia as one of the 100 Australian Living Treasures.

== Early life and education ==
Leslie Allan Murray was born on 17 October 1938, in Nabiac, New South Wales, and grew up in nearby Bunyah. He attended primary and early high school in Nabiac and then Taree High School. At age 18, while watching mayflies along the river, Murray decided to become a poet.

In 1957, Murray entered the University of Sydney in the Faculty of Arts and joined the Royal Australian Navy Reserve to obtain a small income. Speaking about this time to Clive James he said:

"I was as soft-headed as you could imagine. I was actually hanging on to childhood because I hadn't had much teenage. My Mum died and my father collapsed. I had to look after him. So I was off the chain at last, I was in Sydney and I didn't quite know how to do adulthood or teenage. I was being coltish and foolish and childlike. I received the least distinguished degree Sydney ever issued. I don't think anyone's ever matched it."

In 1961 The Bulletin published one of Murray's poems. He developed an interest in ancient and modern languages, and eventually qualified to become a professional translator at the Australian National University (where he was employed from 1963 to 1967). During his studies he met other poets and writers such as Geoffrey Lehmann, Bob Ellis, Clive James, and Lex Banning, as well as future political journalists Laurie Oakes and Mungo McCallum Jr. Between times, he hitch-hiked around Australia. Murray lived for several months at a Sydney Push household at Milsons Point, where he read Virgil's Eclogues at the suggestion of his host, Brian Jenkins.

Murray returned to undergraduate studies in the 1960s. He converted to Roman Catholicism when he married Budapest-born fellow-student Valerie Morelli in 1962. His poetry frequently refers to Catholic themes. The couple lived in Wales and Scotland and travelled in Europe for over a year in the late 1960s. They had five children together. Their son Alexander was diagnosed with autism, which prompted Murray to discover traits of the condition in himself. In an interview with Image, Murray described himself as "a high-performing Asperger".

In 1971, Murray resigned from his "respectable cover occupations" of translator and public servant in Canberra to write poetry full-time. The family returned to Sydney, but Murray, planning to return to his home at Bunyah, managed to buy back part of the lost family home in 1975 and to visit there intermittently until 1985, when he and his family returned to live there permanently.

== Death ==
Murray died on 29 April 2019 at a Taree, New South Wales, nursing home at the age of 80. His wife, Valerie, died on 30 September 2025 at a Tuncurry nursing home, aged 84.

== Literary career ==
Murray had a long career in poetry and literary journalism in Australia. When he was 38 years old, his Selected Poems was published by Angus & Robertson, signifying his emergence as a leading poet. The Murray biographer Peter Alexander has written that "all Murray's volumes are uneven, though as Bruce Clunies Ross would remark, 'There's "less good" and "good", but it's very hard to find really inferior Murray'."

When Murray was a student at the University of Sydney he was the editor of Hermes with Geoffrey Lehmann (1962). Murray edited the magazine Poetry Australia (1973–79). During his tenure as poetry editor for Angus & Robertson (1976–90) he was responsible for publishing the first book of poetry by Philip Hodgins. In March 1990, Murray became literary editor of Quadrant. He edited several anthologies, including the Anthology of Australian Religious Poetry. First published in 1986, a second edition was published in 1991. It interprets religion loosely and includes the work of many of poets such A. D. Hope, Judith Wright, Rosemary Dobson, Kevin Hart, Bruce Dawe and himself. The New Oxford Book of Australian Verse was most recently reissued in 1996.

In 1972, Murray and some other Sydney activists launched the Australian Commonwealth Party, and authored its unusually idealistic campaign manifesto. During the 1970s he opposed the New Poetry or "literary modernism" which emerged in Australia at that time, and was a major contributor to what is known in Australian poetry circles as "the poetry wars". "One of his complaints against post-modernism was that it removed poetry from widespread, popular readership, leaving it the domain of a small intellectual clique." As American reviewer Albert Mobilio describes it, Murray "waged a campaign for accessibility".

Murray described himself, perhaps half-jokingly, as the last of the "Jindyworobaks", an Australian literary movement whose white members sought to promote Indigenous Australian ideas and customs, particularly in poetry. Though not a member, he was influenced by their work, something that is frequently discussed by Murray critics and scholars in relation to his themes and sensibilities.

In 1995, Murray became involved in the Demidenko/Darville affair. Helen Darville, an Australian writer who had won several major literary awards for her novel The Hand That Signed the Paper, had claimed to be the daughter of a Ukrainian immigrant, though her parents were in fact English migrants. Murray said of Darville that

"She was a young girl, and her book mightn't have been the best in the world, but it was pretty damn good for a girl of her age [20 when she wrote it]. And her marketing strategy of pretending to be a Ukrainian might have been unwise, but it sure did expose the pretensions of the multicultural industry".

Biographer Alexander writes that in his poem "A Deployment of Fashion", Murray linked "the attack on Darville with the wider phenomenon of attacks on those judged outcasts (from Lindy Chamberlain to Pauline Hanson) by society's fashion police, the journalists, academics and others who form opinion.

In 1996, Murray became involved in a controversy about whether Australian historian Manning Clark had received and regularly worn the medal of the Order of Lenin.

In 2007, Dan Chiasson wrote in The New Yorker that Murray was "now routinely mentioned among the three or four leading English-language poets". Murray was talked of as a possible winner of the Nobel Prize in Literature.

Murray retired as literary editor of Quadrant in late 2018 for health reasons.

== Poetry ==
Murray published around 30 volumes of poetry and is often called Australia's bush-bard. The academic David McCooey described Murray in 2002 as "a traditional poet whose work is radically original". His poetry is rich and diverse, while also exhibiting "an obvious unity and wholeness" based on "his consistent commitment to the ideals and values of what he sees as the real Australia".

While admiring Murray's linguistic skill and poetic achievement, poet John Tranter, in 1977, also expressed uneasiness about some aspects of his work. Tranter praises Murray's "good humour" and concludes that "For all my disagreements, and many of them are profound, I found the Vernacular Republic full of rich and complex poetry."

Bourke writes that:

Murray's strength is the dramatization of general ideas and the description of animals, machines, or landscape. At times his immense self-confidence produces garrulity and sweeping, dismissive prescriptions. The most attractive poems show enormous powers of invention, lively play with language, and command of rhythm and idiom. In these poems Murray invariably explores social questions through a celebration of common objects from the natural world, as in "The Broad Bean Sermon", or machines, as in "Machine Portraits with Pendant Spaceman". Always concerned with a "common reader", Murray's later poetry (for example, Dog Fox Field, 1990, Translations from the Natural World, 1992) recovers "populist" conventions of newspaper verse, singsong rhyme, and doggerel.

American reviewer Albert Mobilio writes in his review of Learning Human: Selected Poems that Murray revived the traditional ballad form. He goes on to comment on Murray's conservatism and his humour:

"Because his conservatism is imbued with an angular, self-mocking wit, which very nearly belies the down-home values being expressed, he catches readers up in the joke. We end up delighted by his dexterity, if a bit doubtful about the end to which it's been put."

In 2003, Australian poet Peter Porter, reviewing Murray's New Collected Poems, makes a somewhat similar paradoxical assessment of Murray:

"A skewer of polemic runs through his work. His brilliant manipulation of language, his ability to turn words into installations of reality, is often forced to hang on an embarrassing moral sharpness. The parts we love – the Donne-like baroque – live side by side with sentiments we don't: his increasingly automatic opposition to liberalism and intellectuality."

== Themes and subjects ==
Twelve years after Murray's induced birth, his mother miscarried another child. She died after the doctor failed to call an ambulance. Literary critic Lawrence Bourke writes that "Murray, linking his birth to her death, traces his poetic vocation from these traumatic events, seeing in them the relegation of the rural poor by urban élites. Dispossession, relegation, and independence become major preoccupations of his poetry". Beyond this, though, his poetry is generally seen to have a nationalistic bent. The Oxford Companion to Australian Literature writes that:

The continuing themes of much of his poetry are those inherent in that traditional nationalistic identity – respect, even reverence, for the pioneers; the importance of the land and its shaping influence on the Australian character, down-to-earth, laconic ... and based on such Bush-bred qualities as egalitarianism, practicality, straight-forwardness and independence; special respect for that Australian character in action in wartime ... and a brook-no-argument preference for the rural life over the sterile and corrupting urban environment.

Of his literary journalism, Bourke writes that "In a lively, frequently polemic prose style he promotes republicanism, patronage, Gaelic bardic poetry, warrior virtu, mysticism, and Aboriginal models, and attacks modernism and feminism."

Andreas Dorschel points out that in Les Murray's poetry Australia appears as "a country which tourism and business have deprived of its mystery".

== Adaptations ==
In 2005, The Widower, a short film based on five poems by Murray, was released. It was directed by Kevin Lucas and written by singer and festival director Lyndon Terracini, with music by Elena Kats-Chernin. Its cast included Chris Haywood and Frances Rings. The five poems used for the film are "Evening Alone at Bunyah", "Noonday Axeman", "The Widower in the Country", "Cowyard Gates" and "The Last Hellos". Sydney Morning Herald reviewer Paul Byrnes concludes his review with:

The film is stunningly beautiful at times, and wildly ambitious, an attempt to be both wordless and wordy, to get to the hypnotic state that poetry and music can induce while saying something meaningful about black and white attitudes to land and love. This last part, as I read Murray, is largely imposed and disruptive, trying to pin a romantic political agenda to the work that's hardly there. It makes the film too literal, too current, when it wants to lodge itself in the more mysterious part of the brain. The film still has a power – Haywood's performance is magnificent – but it never achieves a strong inner reality. It falls short of its own tall ambitions.

== Awards and nominations ==
- 1984 – Kenneth Slessor Prize for Poetry for The People's Other World
- 1989 – Creative Arts Fellowship
- 1989 – Officer of the Order of Australia for services to Australian literature
- 1991 – Grace Leven Prize for Poetry for Dog Fox Field
- 1993 – Kenneth Slessor Prize for Poetry for Translations from the Natural World
- 1995 – Petrarca-Preis (Petrarch Prize)
- 1996 – T. S. Eliot Prize for Subhuman Redneck Poems
- 1997 – Rated by the National Trust of Australia as one of the 100 Australian Living Treasures.
- 1998 – Queen's Gold Medal for Poetry
- 2001 – shortlisted for the International Griffin Poetry Prize for Learning Human
- 2002 – shortlisted for the International Griffin Poetry Prize for Conscious & Verbal
- 2005 – Premio Mondello, Italy for Fredy Neptune

== Works ==
=== Poetry collections ===
- 1965: The Ilex Tree (with Geoffrey Lehmann), Canberra, ANU Press
- 1969: The Weatherboard Cathedral, Sydney, Angus & Robertson
- 1972: Poems Against Economics, Angus & Robertson
- 1974: Lunch and Counter Lunch, Angus & Robertson
- 1976: Selected Poems: The Vernacular Republic, Angus & Robertson
- 1977: Ethnic Radio, Angus & Robertson
- 1982: Equanimities
- 1982: The Vernacular Republic: Poems 1961–1981, Angus & Robertson; Edinburgh, Canongate; New York, Persea Books, 1982 and (enlarged and revised edition) Angus & Robertson, 1988
- 1983: Flowering Eucalypt in Autumn
- 1983: The People's Otherworld : Poems
- 1986: Selected Poems, Carcanet Press
- 1987: The Daylight Moon, Angus & Robertson, 1987; Carcanet Press 1988 and Persea Books, 1988
- 1994: Collected Poems, Port Melbourne, William Heinemann Australia
- 1989: The Idyll Wheel
- 1990: Dog Fox Field, Sydney, Angus & Robertson, 1990; Carcanet Press, 1991 and New York, Farrar, Straus and Giroux, 1993
- 1991: Collected Poems, Angus & Robertson, 1991; Carcanet Press, 1991; London, Minerva, 1992 and (released as The Rabbiter's Bounty, Collected Poems), Farrar, Straus and Giroux, 1991
- 1992: Translations from the Natural World, Paddington: Isabella Press, 1992; Carcanet Press, 1993 and Farrar, Straus and Giroux, 1994
- 1994: Collected Poems, Port Melbourne, William Heinemann Australia
- 1996: Selected Poems, Carcanet Press
- 1996: Subhuman Redneck Poems
- 1997: Killing the Black Dog, Black Inc Publishing
- 1999: New Selected Poems, Duffy & Snellgrove
- 1999: Conscious and Verbal, Duffy & Snellgrove
- 2001: Learning Human: New Selected Poems (Poetry pleiade), Farrar, Straus and Giroux, Carcanet
- 2002: Poems the Size of Photographs, Duffy & Snellgrove and Carcanet Press
- 2002: New Collected Poems, Duffy & Snellgrove; Carcanet Press, 2003
- 2006: The Biplane Houses, Carcanet Press. Farrar, Straus and Giroux, 2008
- 2010: Taller When Prone, Black Inc Publishing
- 2011: Killing the Black Dog: A Memoir of Depression, Farrar, Straus and Giroux, 86 pp (autobiographical)
- 2012: The Best 100 Poems of Les Murray, Black Inc Publishing
- 2014: New Selected Poems, Farrar, Straus and Giroux
- 2015: Waiting for the Past, Black Inc.
- 2015: The Tin Wash Dish, The Chinese University of Hong Kong Press
- 2015: On Bunyah, Black Inc Publishing
- 2018: Collected Poems, Black Inc Publishing
- 2022: Continuous Creation: Last Poems, Farrar, Straus and Giroux

=== Collections as editor ===
- 1986: Anthology of Australian Religious Poetry (editor), Melbourne, Collins Dove, 1986 (new edition, 1991)
- 1991: The New Oxford Book of Australian Verse, Melbourne, Oxford University Press, 1986 and Oxford, Oxford University Press, 1991, 1999
- 1994: Fivefathers, Five Australian Poets of the Pre-Academic Era, Carcanet Press
- 2005: Hell and After, Four early English-language poets of Australia Carcanet
- 2005: Best Australian Poems 2004, Melbourne, Black Inc.
- 2012: The Quadrant Book of Poetry 2001–2010, Sydney, Quadrant Books

=== Verse novels ===
- 1980: The Boys Who Stole the Funeral, Angus & Robertson, 1980, 1982 and Manchester, Carcanet, 1989
- 1999: Fredy Neptune, Carcanet and Duffy & Snellgrove

=== Prose collections ===
- 1978: The Peasant Mandarin, St. Lucia, UQP
- 1984: Persistence in Folly: Selected Prose Writings, Angus & Robertson
- 1984: The Australian Year: The Chronicle of our Seasons and Celebrations, Angus & Robertson
- 1990: Blocks and Tackles, Angus & Robertson
- 1992: The Paperbark Tree: Selected Prose, Carcanet; Minerva, 1993
- 1999: The Quality of Sprawl: Thoughts about Australia, Duffy & Snellgrove
- 2000: A Working Forest, essays, Duffy & Snellgrove
- 2002: The Full Dress, An Encounter with the National Gallery of Australia, National Gallery of Australia

=== Selected list of poems ===
Title	Year	First published	Reprinted/collected in
"Driving Through Sawmill Towns"	1965		The Ilex Tree by Les Murray and Geoffrey Lehmann, Australian National University Press, 1965, pp. 40–41
"An Absolutely Ordinary Rainbow"	1967		The Weatherboard Cathedral by Les Murray, Angus and Robertson, 1969, pp. 47–48
"The Broad Bean Sermon"	1974	The Sydney Morning Herald, 6 April 1974	Lunch and Counter Lunch by Les Murray, Angus & Robertson, 1974, pp. 55–56
"The Mitchells"	1974		Lunch and Counter Lunch by Les Murray, Angus & Robertson, 1974, p. 1
"The Buladelah-Taree Holiday Song Cycle"	1976	The Herald, 7 September 1976	Ethnic Radio by Les Murray, Angus and Robertson, 1977, pp. 28–38
"The Quality of Sprawl"	1983	True North/Down Under, no. 1 1983	The People's Otherworld: Poems by Les Murray, Angus and Robertson, 1983, pp. 28–29
"The Dream of Wearing Shorts Forever"	1984	The Adelaide Review, 8 November 1984	Selected Poems by Les Murray, Carcanet, 1986, pp. 128–130

== See also ==
- List of Australian poets
