= James Brunton Stephens =

Australian poet

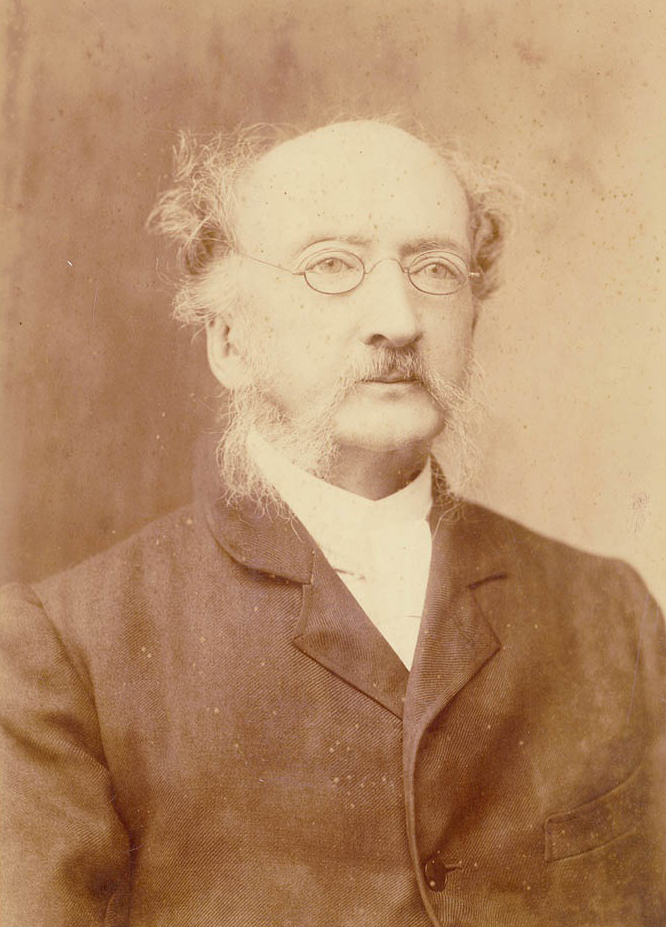
- Studio portrait of James Brunton Stephens, 1895-1900
- Born: 17 June 1835; Bo'ness, Scotland
- Died: 29 June 1902 (aged 67); Brisbane, Queensland, Australia
- Occupations: Editor and poet
- Spouse: Rosalie Mary Donaldson
- Children: 4 daughters, 1 son
- Writing career
- Language: English
- Years active: 1867–1902
- Notable work: Convict Once and Other Poems

James Brunton Stephens (17 June 1835 – 29 June 1902) was a Scottish-born Australian poet, and author of Convict Once.

== Early life ==
Stephens was born in Bo'ness, on the Firth of Forth, Scotland; the son of John Stephens, the parish schoolmaster, and his wife Jane, née Brunton. J. B. Stephens was educated at his father's school, then at a free boarding school and at the University of Edinburgh from 1849 to 1854 without obtaining a degree. For three years he was a travelling tutor on the continent, and from 1859 became a school teacher in Scotland. While teaching at Greenock Academy, Stephens wrote some minor verse and two short novels (Rutson Morley and Virtue Le Moyne) which were published in Sharpe's London Magazine in 1861–63.

== Career in Australia ==
Stephens migrated to Australia in 1866 and tutored the children of a squatter in Queensland. He joined the education department in 1873 and taught at several schools near Brisbane.

In September 1878, Stephens became a founding member and an early president of the famed literary Johnsonian Club, Brisbane; 'an institution being the association of pressmen, artists, actors, and scientists'.

In 1883 he was appointed to a clerical position in the Colonial Secretary's department, where he was promoted to undersecretary.

== Poetry critique ==
His poems on federation – "The Dominion of Australia" and "The Dominion" – are among his most notable productions. At least eighteen of his published poems have unmistakably Australian themes and settings: "Fulfilment", "Cape Byron", "A Coin of Trajan in Australia", "A Lost Chance", "Adelaide Ironside", "Australian Anthem", "Opening Hymn", "Drought and Doctrine", "Marsupial Bill", "A Piccaninny", "To a Black Gin", "New Chum and Old Monarch", "The Great Pig Story of the Tweed", "A Son of the Soil", "Big Ben", "The Southern Cross", "A Brisbane Reverie" and "Convict Once".

"The Dominion" was quoted in Sir Henry Parkes' 'Tenterfield Oration', an 1889 speech calling for the federation of Australia.

In 1892 he wrote the libretto for a comic opera, Fayette; or, Bush Revels. G. B. Allen was the composer.

== Personal ==
On 10 November 1876, Stephens had married Rosalie Mary Donaldson (1846–1932), and they had five children, Jessie Mary (1877–1945), Mary (1879–1961), Hubert (1881–), Rachael Catherine (1883–1967), and Georgina (1886–1961).

He died on 29 June 1902. His funeral was held the next day and proceeded from Wyuna, his residence on Water Street at Highgate Hill, to the South Brisbane Cemetery. Stephens was buried in the same joint plot as his parents-in-law, Thomas Willet Donaldson (c. 1810–1875) and Barbara Donaldson (c. 1814–1898), and survived by his wife, four daughters, and one son. His wife, and three daughters (Jessie, Mary and Georgina) were later interred in the family plot.

== Bibliography ==
=== Novel ===
- A Hundred Pounds: A Novelette (1876)

=== Verse novel ===
- Convict Once (1871)

=== Poetry collections ===
- The Black Gin and Other Poems (1873)
- Miscellaneous Poems (1880)
- Convict Once and Other Poems (1885)
- The Poetical Works of Brunton Stephens (1902)
- My Chinee Cook and Other Humorous Verses (1902)

=== Selected list of poems ===
Title	Year	First published	Reprinted/collected in
"The Dominion"	1877	The Queenslander, 4 August 1877	Miscellaneous Poems, Watson Ferguson, 1880, pp. 171-174
