= 1961 in Australian literature =

This article presents a list of the historical events and publications of Australian literature during 1961.

== Events ==
The Australian Book Review was founded in 1961 by Max Harris and Rosemary Wighton.

== Books ==
- James Aldridge – The Last Exile
- Mena Calthorpe – The Dyehouse
- A. Bertram Chandler – The Rim of Space
- Kenneth Cook – Wake in Fright
- Dymphna Cusack – Heatwave in Berlin
- Nene Gare – The Fringe Dwellers
- Xavier Herbert – Soldiers' Women
- Elizabeth Kata – Be Ready with Bells and Drums
- H. A. Lindsay – Janie McLachlan
- John O'Grady – No Kava for Johnny
- Ruth Park – The Good Looking Women (aka Serpent's Delight)
- Hal Porter – The Tilted Cross
- F. J. Thwaites – Beyond the Rainbow
- George Turner – A Stranger and Afraid
- Arthur Upfield – The White Savage
- Judah Waten – Time of Conflict
- Patrick White – Riders in the Chariot

== Short stories ==
- Thea Astley – "Cubby"
- A. Bertram Chandler – "All Laced Up"
- Shirley Hazzard – "Woollahra Road"
- Ray Mathew – A Bohemian Affair : Short Stories
- D'Arcy Niland
  - The Ballad of the Fat Bushranger : And Other Stories
  - Dadda Jumped Over Two Elephants
  - Logan's Girl and Other Stories
- Desmond O'Grady – "Barbecue"
- Charles Osborne – Australian Stories of Today (edited)
- Hal Porter – "Say to Me Ronald!"

== Crime and mystery ==
- Mark McShane – Seance on a Wet Afternoon
- Arthur Upfield – The White Savage
- Morris West – Daughter of Silence

== Children's and Young Adult fiction ==
- L. H. Evers – The Racketty Street Gang
- John Gunn – Dangerous Enemies
- Ruth Park – The Hole in the Hill
- Betty Roland – Forbidden Bridge
- Colin Thiele – Sun on the Stubble
- Joan Woodberry – Rafferty Rides a Winner

== Poetry ==
- Vincent Buckley
  - Masters in Israel
  - "Secret Policeman"
- Emily Bulcock – From Australia to Britain
- Gwen Harwood – "In the Park"
- A. D. Hope – "The Double Looking Glass"
- David Malouf – "At My Grandmother's"
- Peter Porter – Once Bitten, Twice Bitten
- Elizabeth Riddell – Forbears
- Thomas Shapcott – Time on Fire
- Randolph Stow
  - "Dust"
  - "Ruins of the City of Hay"
- Chris Wallace-Crabbe – "Melbourne"
- Francis Webb – Socrates and Other Poems

== Biography ==
- Frank Hardy – The Hard Way : The Story Behind Power Without Glory

== Drama ==
=== Theatre ===
- Ray Lawler – The Piccadilly Bushman
- Morris West – The Devil's Advocate

== Awards and honours ==
=== Literary ===
Award	Author	Title	Publisher
ALS Gold Medal	Not awarded		
Miles Franklin Award	Patrick White	Riders in the Chariot	Eyre & Spottiswoode

=== Children and Young Adult ===
Award	Category	Author	Title	Publisher
Children's Book of the Year Award	Older Readers	Nan Chauncy, illustrated by Brian Wildsmith	Tangara	Oxford University Press
Children's Book of the Year Award	Picture Book	No award		

=== Poetry ===
Award	Author	Title	Publisher
Grace Leven Prize for Poetry	Thomas Shapcott	Time on Fire	Jacaranda Press

== Births ==
A list, ordered by date of birth (and, if the date is either unspecified or repeated, ordered alphabetically by surname) of births in 1961 of Australian literary figures, authors of written works or literature-related individuals follows, including year of death.

- 29 June — Peter FitzSimons, writer
- 20 August – Greg Egan, novelist and short story writer
- 3 September — Andy Griffiths, writer for children
- 30 September — Jordie Albiston, poet and academic (died 2022)
- 29 October — Michael Gurr, playwright, author, speech writer and screenwriter (died 2017)

Unknown date

- Richard Flanagan, novelist

== Deaths ==
A list, ordered by date of death (and, if the date is either unspecified or repeated, ordered alphabetically by surname) of deaths in 1961 of Australian literary figures, authors of written works or literature-related individuals follows, including year of birth.

- 6 February — Rupert Atkinson, poet (born 1881)
- 22 May — Lionel Lindsay, artist and essayist (born 1874)
- 9 June – Jeannie Gunn, novelist (born 1870)
- 27 June – Harry Hooton, poet and social commentator (born 1908)
- 24 July – William Fleming, novelist and poet (born 1874)
- 26 July — Alice Gore-Jones, poet (born 1887)
- 30 July — James Robert Tyrrell, bookseller, art dealer, publisher and author (born 1875)
- 20 August — Alice Grant Rosman, novelist (born 1882)
- 6 October – Mary Montgomerie Bennett, biographer and nonfiction author (born 1881)

== See also ==
- 1961 in Australia
- 1961 in literature
- 1961 in poetry
- List of years in Australian literature
- List of years in literature
