= 1881 in Australian literature =

This article presents a list of the historical events and publications of Australian literature during 1881.

== Books ==
- Rosa Praed – Policy and Passion : A Novel of Australian Life

== Poetry ==
- Mary Hannay Foott – "Where the Pelican Builds"
- George Herbert Gibson – "A Ballad of Queensland"
- Henry Kendall
  - "The Austral Months"
  - "How the Melbourne Cup Was Won"
  - "In Memoriam: Marcus Clarke"

== Short stories ==
- Marcus Clarke – "The Mystery of Major Molineux"

== Births ==
A list, ordered by date of birth (and, if the date is either unspecified or repeated, ordered alphabetically by surname) of births in 1881 of Australian literary figures, authors of written works or literature-related individuals follows, including year of death.

- 2 February — E. J. Rupert Atkinson, poet (died 1961)
- 6 April – Furnley Maurice, poet (died 1942)
- 2 May – H. M. Green, journalist, librarian, poet and literary critic (died 1962)
- 23 May – Hilary Lofting, novelist (died 1939)
- 4 July – Sumner Locke, novelist (died 1917)
- 8 July – Mary Montgomerie Bennett, biographer and nonfiction author (died 1961)
- 25 August – Lillian Pyke, children's writer and, as Erica Maxwell, novelist (died 1927)
- 19 October – Hilda Bridges, novelist and short story writer (died 1971)
- 16 November – Ernest O'Ferrall, poet and author (died 1925)

Unknown date

- Kathleen Dalziel, poet (died 1969)

== Deaths ==
A list, ordered by date of death (and, if the date is either unspecified or repeated, ordered alphabetically by surname) of deaths in 1881 of Australian literary figures, authors of written works or literature-related individuals follows, including year of birth.

- 12 July – Caroline Leakey, poet and novelist (born 1827)
- 2 August – Marcus Clarke, novelist (born 1846)

== See also ==
- 1881 in Australia
- 1881 in literature
- 1881 in poetry
- List of years in Australian literature
- List of years in literature
