= A Captive in the Land (novel) =

Book by James Aldridge

- First edition
- Author: James Aldridge
- Cover artist: Youngman Carter
- Language: English
- Genre: Fiction
- Publisher: Hamish Hamilton, London
- Publication date: 1962
- Publication place: Australia
- Media type: Print
- Pages: 376 pp
- Preceded by: The Last Exile
- Followed by: My Brother Tom

A Captive in the Land (1962) is a novel by Australian writer James Aldridge.

== Story outline ==
While undertaking a meteorological survey of the Arctic the crew of a Dakota aircraft observe a wrecked plane on the ice with one person moving around the area. With the Dakota unable to land Rupert Royce volunteers to parachute down to the wreckage to offer assistance. He succeeds but soon learns that the Dakota itself has crashed on returning to base with the loss of all the crew. Royce and the survivor spend the winter in the fuselage of the plane and then Royce decides to seek help by trekking 20 miles across the Arctic ice. He succeeds and is invited to Moscow to receive a medal for his deeds. As he is about to leave British intelligence requests he undertake some espionage activities during his travels in Russia.

== Critical reception ==
A reviewer in The Canberra Times was very impressed with the first 100 pages of the novel, but found problems after that: "In recounting this journey Aldridge is brilliant and convincing. Like the doyens of all adventure books he has an incredible eye for detailed realism. After this, Mr. Aldridge goes on far too long."

== See also ==
- 1962 in Australian literature

== Notes ==
- Epigraph: "A captive in the land, / A stranger and a youth, / He heard the king's command, / He saw that writing's truth." Lord Byron, Vision of Belshazzar, Hebrew Melodies

== Film adaptation ==
The novel was adapted for the screen in 1990. The adaptation was directed by John Berry from a script by John Berry and Lee Gold. It featured Sam Waterston, Aleksandr Potapov and Keir Giles.
