= 1961 in poetry =

Nationality words link to articles with information on the nation's poetry or literature (for instance, Irish or France).

== Events ==
- January 20 – Robert Frost recites his poem "The Gift Outright" at the Inauguration of John F. Kennedy as President of the United States.
- February 16 – English poet Robert Graves is appointed Professor of Poetry at the University of Oxford in succession to W. H. Auden.
- February – American poet in London Sylvia Plath suffers a miscarriage. Several of her poems, including "Parliament Hill Fields", address this event.
- November – Liverpool poets Roger McGough, Adrian Henri and Brian Patten first meet, in a basement coffee bar on the city's Mount Pleasant.
- Keith and Rosmarie Waldrop buy a secondhand printing press and start Burning Deck magazine in the United States.
- Tish literary magazine, founded in Vancouver, British Columbia. It is published intermittently until 1969. Poets associated with the magazine include Frank Davey, Fred Wah, George Bowering, and, briefly, bpNichol when he lives in Vancouver.
- Kyk-over-al magazine in Guyana ceases publication

== Works published in English ==
Listed by nation where the work was first published and again by the poet's native land, if different; substantially revised works listed separately:

=== Australia ===
- Vincent Buckley
  - Masters in Israel
  - "Secret Policeman"
- Gwen Harwood, "In the Park"
- A. D. Hope, Poems (Australia)
- Thomas Shapcott, Time on Fire
- Kenneth Slessor, The Penguin Book of Modern Australian Verse, Melbourne, anthology

=== Canada ===
- Earle Birney, Ice Cod Bell on Stone
- Arthur Bourinot, Poems: Paul Bunyan, Three Lincoln Poems and Other Verse
- Leonard Cohen, The Spice-Box of Earth
- Robert Finch
  - Dover Beach Revisited, a meditation on the significance of Matthew Arnold
  - Acis in Oxford and Other Poems
- Ralph Gustafson, Rivers Among Rocks
- Daryl Hine, The Devil's Picture Books
- D. G. Jones, The Sun is Axeman
- Irving Layton, The Swinging Flesh
- Eli Mandel and Jean Guy Pilon, Poetry 62, an anthology
- Gwendolyn MacEwen:
  - Selah. Toronto: Aleph Press.
  - The Drunken Clock. Toronto: Aleph Press.
- D. Pacey, Creative Writing in Canada, revised edition (scholarship)
- Dorothy Roberts, Twice to Flame

=== Ireland ===
- Austin Clarke, Later Poems, Dublin: Dolmen Press, Ireland
- Thomas Kinsella:
  - Downstream, Dublin: Dolmen Press
  - Poems and Translations, New York: Atheneum

=== India in English ===
- Lila Ray, Entrance( Poetry in English ), Calcutta: Writers Workshop, India.
- Harindranath Chattopadhyaya, Masks and Farewells, Bombay: Asia
- Ira De, The Hunt and Other Poems ( Poetry in English ), Calcutta: Writers Workshop, India. (revised edition 1968)
- Sarojini Naidu, The Feather of the Dawn, posthumously published (died in 1949), edited by her daughter, Padmaja Naidu
- Trilok Chandra, A Hundred and One Flowers

=== United Kingdom ===
- James K. Baxter, Howrah Bridge and Other Poems, London: Oxford University Press, New Zealand poet published in the United Kingdom
- Thomas Blackburn, A Smell of Burning
- Alan Brownjohn, The Railings
- Charles Causley, Johnny Alleluia
- Jack Clemo, The Map of Clay
- Padraic Colum, Irish Elegies
- Donald Davie, New and Selected Poems, Middletown, Connecticut: Wesleyan University Press
- Paul Dehn, Quake, quake, quake: a leaden treasury of English verse
- Ian Hamilton Finlay, Glasgow Beasts, An a Burd, Edinburgh: Wild Flounder Press
- Roy Fisher, City
- John Fuller, Fairground Music
- Robert Graves, More Poems 1961
- Thom Gunn, My Sad Captains, and Other Poems, London: Faber and Faber; University of Chicago Press
- Geoffrey Hill, "Ovid in the Third Reich", "Locust Songs" and "Annunciations"
- Ralph Hodgson, Collected Poems
- David Holbrook, Imaginings
- Graham Hough, Legends and Pastorals
- Elizabeth Jennings, Song for a Birth or a Death, and Other Poems
- Jenny Joseph, "Warning"
- Edward Lucie-Smith, A Tropical Childhood, and Other Poems, including "The Witnesses", "The Fault", and "On Looking at Stubb's Anatomy of the Horse"
- Hugh MacDiarmid, pen name of Christopher Murray Grieve, The Kind of Poetry I Want
- Louis MacNeice, Solstices
- John Masefield, Bluebells, and Other Verse
- John Montague, The Nature of Cold Weather, London: MacGibbon and Kee
- Peter Porter, Once Bitten, Twice Bitten, by an Australian living in England, Northwood, Middlesex: Scorpion Press
- Peter Redgrove, The Collector, London: Routledge and Kegan Paul
- Siegfried Sassoon, Collected Poems
- C. H. Sisson, The London Zoo
- Iain Crichton Smith, Thistles and Roses
- Jon Stallworthy, The Astronomy of Love
- Gillian Stoneham, When That April
- R.S. Thomas, Tares, Welsh
- Marina Tsvetayeva, The Selected Poems of Marina Tsvetayeva, translated by Elaine Feinstein, Oxford University Press, first of four editions (and a much-revised fifth edition)
- John Wain, Weep Before God, including "Time Was", which won second prize in the international Borestone Mountain Poetry Awards competition, London: Macmillan

==== Criticism, scholarship and biography in the United Kingdom ====
- William Empson, Milton's God
- Doris Landley Moore, The Late Lord Byron

=== United States ===
- Lee Anderson, Nags Head
- Helen Bevington, When Found, Make a Verse Of
- Paul Blackburn, The Nets
- Harold Bloom, John Hollander, editors, The Wind and the Rain
- Philip Booth, The Islanders
- Joseph Payne Brennan, The Wind of Time, Hawk & Whippoorwill Press August Derleth
- John Ciardi, In the Stoneworks
- Leonard Cohen, The Spice-Box of Earth
- Donald Davidson, The Long Street
- August Derleth, editor, Fire and Sleet and Candlelight
- H.D. (Hilda Doolittle), Helen in Egypt, a long retelling of the tale in lyrical prose and verse of the Helen of Troy tale
- Ed Dorn, The Newly Fallen, Totem Press
- Alan Dugan, Poems
- Abbie Houston Evans, Fact of Crystal
- Lawrence Ferlinghetti, Starting from San Francisco
- Arthur Freeman, Apollonian Poems
- George Garrett, Abraham's Knife
- Allen Ginsberg:
  - Empty Mirror: Early Poems, New York: Totem/Corinth
  - Kaddish and Other Poems, San Francisco: City Lights Books
- Horace Gregory, Medusa in Gramercy Park
- Thom Gunn, My Sad Captains, London: Faber and Faber; University of Chicago Press Briton
- Daryl Hine, Heroics
- John Hollander, The Untuning of the Sky (also see Harold Bloom/John Hollander item above)
- John Holmes, The Fortune Teller
- David Ignatow, Say Pardon
- LeRoi Jones, Preface to a Twenty Volume Suicide Note
- Carolyn Kizer, The Ungrateful Garden, Bloomington: Indiana University Press
- Maxine Kumin, Halfway
- Denise Levertov, The Jacob's Ladder, New York: New Directions
- Philip Levine, On the Edge
- Robert Lowell, Imitations
- W. S. Merwin:
  - Translator, Some Spanish Ballads, London: Abelard (American edition: Spanish Ballads, 1961, New York: Doubleday Anchor)
  - Editor, West Wind: Supplement of American Poetry, London: Poetry Book Society
- Pablo Neruda, Odas elementales, translated by C. Lozano and with an introduction by Fernando Alegría
- Lorine Niedecker, My Friend Tree (published with help from Ian Hamilton Finlay)
- John Nist, editor, Modern Brazilian Poetry
- Charles Olson:
  - The Maximus Poems
  - The Distances
- Hyam Plutzik, Horatio, a narrative monologue basically in blank verse
- Theodore Roethke, I Am! Says the Lamb
- May Sarton, Cloud, Stone, Sun, Vine
- Peter Viereck, The Tree Witch
- John Hall Wheelock, The Gardener
- Richard Wilbur, Advice to a Prophet
- James Wright and Robert Bly, translators, Twenty Poems of Georg Trakl (Austrian poet writing in German), The Sixties Press

==== Criticism, scholarship and biography in the United States ====
- Roger Asselineau, The Evolution of Walt Whitman
- Walter Lowenfels, editor, Walt Whitman's Civil War, Whitman's writing about the war
- Edwin Haviland Miller, The Correspondence of Walt Whitman (1842–1875, in two volumes)
- Archibald MacLeish, Poetry and Experience (autobiography)

=== Other in English ===
- James K. Baxter, Howrah Bridge and Other Poems, London: Oxford University Press, New Zealand poet published in the United Kingdom
- J. P. Clark, Poems (Nigeria)
- Allen Curnow, editor, Penguin Book of New Zealand Verse,

== Works published in other languages ==
Listed by language and often by nation where the work was first published and again by the poet's native land, if different; substantially revised works listed separately:

=== French language ===
==== Canada, in French ====
- Rina Lasnier, Mémoire sans jour
- Paul Marie Lapointe, Choix de poèmes
- Jean-Guy Pilon:
  - La Mouette et le large
  - Recours au pays, Montréal: l'Hexagone

==== France ====
- Andre du Bouchet, Dans la chaleur vacante
- Aimé Césaire,Cadastre, Martinique author published in France; Paris: Editions du Seuil
- Jean Cocteau, Le Cérémonial espagnol de Phoenix
- Michel Deguy, Poemes de la presqu'ile
- Max Pol Fouchet, Demeure le Secret
- Eugène Guillevic, Carnac
- Henri Michaux, Connaisance par les gouffres (Life Through Darkness: Exploration Through Drugs"), Paris: Gallimard
- Marie Noël, Chants d'arrière-saison
- Francis Ponge, Le Grand Recueil, three volumes
- Raymond Queneau, Cent mille milliards de poèmes
- Georges Schéhadé, Nocturnes
- Léopold Sédar Senghor, Nocturnes
- Jean Tardieu, Choix de poèmes

===== Criticism, scholarship and biography in France =====
- André Berry, editor, Anthologie de la poésie occitane
- Yves Bonnefoy, Rimbaud
- Saint-John Perse, Poésie: allocution au Banquet Nobel du 10 décembre 1960, Paris: Gallimard

=== Germany ===
- Johannes Bobrowski, Sarmatische Zeit
- Clemens Hesselhaus, editor, Deutsche Lyrik der Moderne: von Nietzsche bis Yvan Goll Düsseldorf: August Bagel an anthology

==== Criticism, scholarship and biography in Germany ====
- Wilhelm Emrich, Protest und Verheissung (criticism)
- Walter Jens, Deutsche Literatur der Gegenwart (criticism)

=== Hebrew ===
- J. Akavyahu, Manginot Hazot ("Midnight Music")
- Anonymous poet from a Soviet Bloc country, Behilokah Halail ("As the Night Is Taken"), the poems were clandestinely smuggled into Israel and published
- K. A. Bertini, Shevil Kahol ("Blue Path")
- A. Broides, El ha-Shahar ha-Gonuz ("Toward the Hidden Dawn")
- Yonah David, Shirim Le-lo Ahava ("Poems on Nonlove")
- Israel Efros, Bain Hofim Nistarim ("Among Hidden Shores")
- Hayim Guri, Shoshanat ha-Ruhot ("Rose of the Winds")
- Yosef Lichtenbaum, ba-Mishor ha-Govoha ("On a High Plain")
- E. Lisitzky, Kemo ha-Yom Rad ("As the Day Wanes") published in the United States
- Anda Pinkerfield-Amir, Gadish ve-Omer ("Sheaf and Measure")
- Gabriel Preil, Mapat Erew ("Map of Evening"), published in the United States
- T. Ribner, Shirim Limzo Et ("Poems in Search of Time")
- Rena Shani, Ir Zara ("Strange City")
- Nathan Zakh, Shirim Shonim ("Various")

==== Criticism, scholarship and biography in Hebrew ====
- B. Kurzweil, Bialik ve- Tchernichovsky — Mehkarim be-Shiratam, about aspects of the works of two important poets of the Hebrew literary renaissance

=== India ===
Listed in alphabetical order by first name:

- Akhtarul Imam, Yaden, Urdu-language
- Ayyappa Paniker, Kurukshetram (written 1952–1957), Malayalam-language
- Nirendranath Chakravarti; Bengali-language:
  - Prothom Nayok, Kolkata: Surabhi Prokashoni
  - Ondhokar Baranda, Kolkata: Krittibaash Prokashoni
- Kunwar Narain, Parivesh Hum Tum, Allahabad: Bharti Bahandar, Leader Press; Hindi-language

=== Italy ===
- Attilio Giuliani, editor, Novissimi, an anthology-cum-manifesto of five poets which, by 1965, will be "increasingly regarded as the principal event in Italian poetry in recent times"

=== Portuguese language ===
==== Portugal ====
- Ruy de Moura Belo, Aquele grande rio Eufrates ("That Great River, the Euphrates")
- Herberto Hélder, A Colher na Boca ("The Spoon in the Mouth")
- Mário Cesariny:
  - Poesia
  - Planisfério e Outros Poemas

=== Spanish language ===
==== Spain ====
- María Victoria Atencia, Cañada de los ingleses
- Miguel Hernández, a "complete" collection of poems (posthumous)
- Gerardo Diego, Glosa a Villamediana

===== Anthologies in Spain =====
- Jimenez Martos, editor, Nuevos poetas españoles, mostly on the work of the "Generation of '54"
- Rafael Montesinos, editor, Poesía taurina contemporánea, including verse by Miguel Hernández, Diego and García Lorca

==== Latin America ====
- Arturo Corcuera, Sombra del jardín
- Roque Dalton, La ventana en rel rostro (El Salvador)
- Hernando Domínguez de Camargo, Obras de Hernando Domínguez de Camargo (posthumous)
- Octavio Paz, Libertad bajo palabra collected poems previously published from 1935 to 1958 in a volume using the title of an earlier book of his
- Carlos A. Velazco, El corazón de silencio

===== Anthologies in Latin America =====
- Anuario del cuento mexicano (Mexico)
- Antonio Cisneros, Destierro, the author's first volume of poetry; Peru
- Ginés de Albareda and F. Garfias, editors, Antología de la poesía hispanoamericana, Volume 8, devoted to Chilean poetry

=== Yiddish ===
==== Israel ====
- Jacob Friedmann, Di legende fun Neyakh Grin ("The Legend of Noah Green")
- Chaim Leib Fox, editor, Schemuelbuch, a scholarly edition of this old Yiddish epic
- Avrom Lev, a book of poetry
- Leyb Olitski, a book of poetry
- Joseph Papernikov, a book of poetry
- Rikuda Potash, a book of poetry
- Arye Shamri, Funken fun tikun ("Sparks of Salvation")
- Avrom Sutzkever, Di gaystike erd ("The Spiritual Soil")

==== Yiddish works published elsewhere ====
- Ephraim Auerbach, Di vayse shtot ("The White City")
- I. L. Kalushiner, a book of poetry
- Israel Emiot, In nigun ayngehert ("Listening to the Melody")
- David Sfard, A zegl in vint ("A Sail in the Wind") (Poland)

=== Other languages ===
- Dritëro Agolli, Hapat e mija në asfalt ("My steps on the pavement"), Albania
- Simin Behbahani, Marmar ("Marble"), Persia
- Syed Shamsul Haque, Ekoda Ek Rajje ("Once upon a time in a kingdom"), Bengali published in East Pakistan
- Alexander Mezhirov, Ветровое стекло ("Windshield" or "Windscreen"), Russia, Soviet Union
- Nizar Qabbani, My Beloved, Syrian poet writing in Arabic
- Klaus Rifbjerg, Camouflage, Denmark

== Awards and honors ==
=== Australia ===
- Grace Leven Prize for Poetry: Thomas Shapcott, Time on Fire

=== United Kingdom ===
- Eric Gregory Award: Adrian Mitchell, Geoffrey Hill

=== United States ===
- Consultant in Poetry to the Library of Congress (later the post would be called "Poet Laureate Consultant in Poetry to the Library of Congress"): Louis Untermeyer appointed this year.
- Pulitzer Prize for Poetry: Phyllis McGinley: Times Three: Selected Verse From Three Decades
- Bollingen Prize: Yvor Winters
- National Book Award for Poetry: Randall Jarrell, The Woman at the Washington Zoo
- Fellowship of the Academy of American Poets: Horace Gregory

=== Other ===
- Lenin Prize (Soviet Union): Alexander Tvardovsky for Za Dalyu dal ... ("Space Beyond Space")
- Canada: Governor General's Award, poetry or drama: Acis in Oxford, Robert Finch

== Births ==
Death years link to the corresponding "[year] in poetry" article:

- May 2 – Lisa Bellear (died 2006), Australian indigenous poet
- May 4 – Ishita Bhaduri, Indian Poet and Author
- May 17 – Han Dong 韩东, Chinese poet and novelist
- June 5 – Swadesh Roy, Bengali journalist, essayist, poet, novelist and short-story writer
- August 14 – Steven Heighton, Canadian novelist and poet
- September 13 – Tom Holt, English historical and comic novelist and poet
- November 9 – Jackie Kay, Scottish poet and novelist
- December 20 – Sion Sono 園 子温, Japanese controversial avant-garde poet and filmmaker
- Also:
  - Ifor ap Glyn, Welsh-language poet
  - Gitaujali Badruddin
  - Chen Kehua, Chinese poet and ophthalmologist in Taiwan
  - Denise Duhamel, American
  - Kenneth Goldsmith, American
  - Maggie Helwig, English-born Canadian novelist, poet and Anglican priest
  - Louis de Paor, Irish-language poet

== Deaths ==
Birth years link to the corresponding "[year] in poetry" article:

- April 30 – Jessie Redmon Fauset, 79 (born 1885), American novelist and poet
- June 26 – Kenneth Fearing, 58 (born 1902), American poet and writer
- September 27 – Hilda Doolittle, known as H.D., 75 (born 1886), American poet, novelist, and memoirist, of a heart attack
- December 24 – Robert Hillyer, 66 (born 1895), American poet

== See also ==
- List of poetry awards
- List of years in poetry
- Poetry
