= Nikolai Kryukov =

Nikolai Kryukov may refer to:

- Nikolai Kryukov (gymnast) (born 1978), Russian artistic gymnast
- Nikolai Kryukov (actor) (1915–1993), Soviet film and theater actor
- Nikolai Kryukov (composer) (1908–1961), Russian composer
