= Reginald Hyde =

New Zealander flying ace

Reginald Jack Hyde
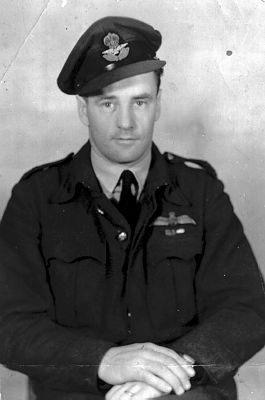
- Hyde in 1944
- Born: 21 December 1912; Islington, Christchurch, New Zealand
- Died: 23 March 1985 (aged 72); Christchurch, New Zealand
- Military career
- Allegiance: New Zealand
- Branch: Royal Air Force Volunteer Reserve; Royal New Zealand Air Force
- Service years: 1938–1945 (RAFVR); 1945 (RNZAF)
- Rank: Squadron Leader
- Units: No. 66 Squadron; No. 261 Squadron; No. 197 Squadron
- Commands: No. 3 Tactical Exercise Unit
- Conflicts: Second World War; Battle of France; Battle of Britain; Siege of Malta; Circus offensive
- Awards: Air Force Cross; Mention in Despatches (2); Air Efficiency Award

Reginald Jack Hyde, AFC, AE (21 December 1912 – 23 March 1985) was a New Zealand flying ace of the Royal Air Force Volunteer Reserve (RAFVR) during the Second World War. He was credited with having shot down at least five aircraft.

Born in Christchurch, Hyde was working in the United Kingdom in an electrical factory when he joined the RAFVR in July 1938. The following year he started receiving full-time flight training with the Royal Air Force (RAF). Mobilised after the outbreak of the Second World War, he was loaned to the Fleet Air Arm and trained to operate from aircraft carriers. Returning to RAF service, he was posted to No. 66 Squadron, and flew patrols over Dunkirk during the evacuation of the British Expeditionary Force and the North Sea during the Battle of Britain. In August 1940 he was sent to Malta, where he served for several months with No. 261 Squadron and achieved the majority of his aerial victories. He returned to the United Kingdom in May 1941, instructing until the end of 1942. He was then posted to No. 197 Squadron, flying on operations to German-occupied Europe as part of the Circus offensive.

Hyde was involved in the making of the film Signed with Their Honour in the later part of 1943, before taking up a series of instructing posts. In February 1945 he transferred to the Royal New Zealand Air Force but continued to serve with the RAF. His final posting was as the commanding officer of No. 3 Tactical Exercise Unit. In September he returned to New Zealand and went onto the Reserve of Pilots at the end of the year. He worked in the electrical industry until his retirement. He died in 1985, aged 72.

== Early life ==
Reginald Jack Hyde was born on 21 December 1912 in Islington, a suburb of Christchurch, New Zealand. He was educated at North Linwood Primary School and then Christchurch Boys' High School. Following his schooling, he gained an apprenticeship as an electrician at a firm in Christchurch, while working towards his certification at the Christchurch Technical College. In 1936, he went to the United Kingdom for work experience, finding employment as an assistant factory manager at an electric tool company near London.

In July 1938, Hyde joined the Royal Air Force Volunteer Reserve (RAFVR); prior to this he had been learning to fly with Cambridge Aero Club. As a sergeant pilot with the RAFVR, he received flight training at the weekends at Redhill. The following year, he applied to receive full-time training and gained his wings in August 1939, just before the outbreak of the Second World War.

== Second World War ==
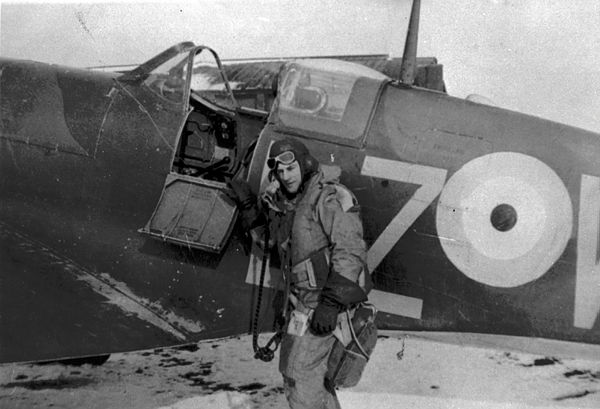
Hyde climbing into a Spitfire of No. 66 Squadron, 1940

Following the invasion of Poland, Hyde, as a member of the RAFVR was mobilised for war service with the Royal Air Force (RAF). He was loaned to the Fleet Air Arm (FAA), being posted to No. 769 Training Squadron at Donibristle in Scotland. Here he flew Gloster Gladiators fighters and Fairey Swordfish torpedo bombers, and practiced landing on the aircraft carrier HMS Furious. In October, he and another RAFVR pilot deliberately failed their FAA training and were returned to the RAF. Hyde was posted to No. 66 Squadron.

Hyde's new unit, based at Duxford and operating the Supermarine Spitfire fighter, regularly patrolled the North Sea and was occasionally scrambled on interception missions. In May 1940, the squadron helped with air cover over the evacuation beaches at Dunkirk during Operation Dynamo. Afterwards, the squadron was based at Coltishall and during the early stages of the Battle of Britain it resumed its patrol duties over the North Sea.

=== Service on Malta ===
In mid-July, Hyde was posted to No. 418 Flight, based at Abbotsinch as a delivery flight to transfer Hawker Hurricane fighters from an aircraft carrier to Malta. The island had been under siege from the Regia Aeronautica (Royal Italian Air Force) following the entry of Italy into the Second World War the previous month. The flight of twelve pilots embarked on HMS Argus on 20 July and after a stop at Gibraltar, flew their Hurricanes off the aircraft carrier on 2 August. The Hurricanes arrived at Luqa after a flight of nearly three hours. It had originally been intended that the pilots would return to Gibraltar via a flying boat but it was later decided that they would stay on Malta as the basis of a new flying unit, No. 261 Squadron; this was to be the first fighter squadron on the island.

At the time of the squadron's formation, the Regia Aeronautica was regularly bombing Malta and, on 8 September, Hyde destroyed two Fiat CR.42 Falco fighters off Grand Harbour. He shot down a Macchi C.200 Saetta fighter on 4 October. By this time, the squadron was operating from Takali as the airstrip at Luqa was required for use by recently arrived RAF bombers. On 10 January 1941, the squadron helped provide cover for the stricken aircraft carrier HMS Illustrious as it made its way to Malta with major damage after being bombed. By this phase of the siege of Malta, the Luftwaffe were also attacking the island and on 19 January, Hyde destroyed a Junkers Ju 88 medium bomber. He shot down one Messerschmitt Bf 109 fighter and damaged another on 22 April. The next month, No. 261 Squadron was disbanded and Hyde, now a flight sergeant, returned to the United Kingdom.

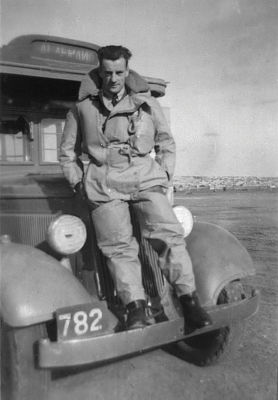
Hyde wearing a flying suit during his service on Malta

=== Later war service ===
Hyde was appointed as an instructor at No. 52 Operational Training Unit (OTU) in Grangemouth in July. Promoted to warrant officer in October, he was mentioned in despatches in the 1942 New Year Honours for his services with the OTU. In January 1942 he was commissioned as a pilot officer and three months later was transferred to No. 55 OTU, instructing pilots on Spitfires.

In December, Hyde, having been promoted to acting flight lieutenant, was posted to No. 197 Squadron. This newly formed unit operated the Hawker Typhoon fighter from the RAF station at Drem and was still in training. It became operational in February 1943, initially carrying out patrols on the east coast but soon it shifted south to Tangmere and started flying on operations to German-occupied Europe as part of the RAF's Circus offensive. On 16 April he probably destroyed a Bf 109 during the squadron's first engagement with German fighters. The frequency of operations increased into the later part of the year and in October, it converted to a fighter-bomber role.

At this time Hyde was rested from operational flying and was sent to Wales, where he was involved in the filming of a movie, Signed with Their Honour; this was based on a book about the RAF in Greece during 1941. Hyde flew Gladiators for three months, during which time he was confirmed in his rank of flight lieutenant. Although aerial sequences were filmed, the movie itself was never completed. In early 1944, he went to Sutton Bridge for a course at the Central Gunnery School there before taking up a posting at No. 3 Tactical Exercise Unit (TEU) at Annan. This was followed by an appointment as the Officer Commanding (OC) of the Gunnery and Rocket Squadron at No. 62 OTU. At this time, he was promoted to acting wing commander.

In recognition of his services with the RAFVR, Hyde was awarded the Air Force Cross in the 1945 New Year Honours. He transferred to the Royal New Zealand Air Force the following month, in the rank of squadron leader, although he remained attached to the RAF. In March, he was named as OC Flying at No. 59 OTU at Acklington and three months later was appointed to command his previous unit, No. 3 TEU, now at Milfield and operating the Hawker Tempest fighter along with Typhoons.

With the war in Europe at an end, Hyde was credited with five aerial victories, as well as the probable destruction of one aircraft and the damage of another. (Note: It is possible that the aerial victories achieved during Hyde's service on Malta are inaccurate; record keeping for much of No. 261 Squadron's time on Malta was limited and many of the claims of its pilots were assembled retrospectively from combat reports and other records, some little more than notes.)

== Later life ==
In July 1945, Hyde was removed from duties in the RAF in anticipation of his return to New Zealand. He arrived in Christchurch in September and went onto the Reserve of Pilots at the end of the year. A recipient of the Air Efficiency Award for his service with the RAFVR, he was mentioned in despatches for the second time in the 1946 New Year Honours, which recognised his service with No. 59 OTU. On resuming his civilian career, he established an electrical business. He was subsequently employed by the local Power Board until his retirement. He died in Christchurch on 23 March 1985.
