= The Sea Eagle =

1944 novel by James Aldridge

- First US edition (publ. Little, Brown)
- Author: James Aldridge
- Language: English
- Genre: Novel
- Publisher: Wyatt and Watts
- Publication date: 1944
- Publication place: Australia
- Media type: Print
- Awards: John Llewellyn Rhys Prize, 1945
- Preceded by: Signed with Their Honour
- Followed by: Of Many Men

The Sea Eagle is a 1944 novel by Australian war correspondent and novelist James Aldridge. It was originally published by Melbourne publisher Wyatt and Watts.

== Plot ==
Set in Axis-occupied Greece and Crete after the Nazi invasion during World War II, it follows the attempts of two Australian soldiers to make passage to Cairo with the help of Greek partisans.

== Reception ==
Winner of the John Llewellyn Rhys Prize in 1945 and hailed as "the finest work of fiction yet produced by the war" (G.W. Bishop in the London Daily Telegraph), it has since fallen into obscurity. His first novel, Signed With Their Honour (1942), was also set in war-time Greece.

== Publishing history ==
After the novel's original publication by Wyatt and Watts in Melbourne, Australia, it was reprinted as follows:

- Little, Brown, USA, 1944
- Michael Joseph Ltd., UK, 1944

The novel was also translated into Swedish in 1944, German, French and Russian in 1945, Polish in 1949, Czech and Slovak in 1955, Lithuanian in 1956, and Dutch in 1967.
