= The Tilted Cross =

Book by Hal Porter

- Author: Hal Porter
- Language: English
- Genre: Literary fiction
- Publisher: Faber and Faber, London
- Publication date: 1961
- Publication place: Australia
- Media type: Print
- Pages: 266 pp
- Preceded by: A Handful of Pennies
- Followed by: The Right Thing

The Tilted Cross (1961) is a novel by Australian author Hal Porter.

== Plot outline ==
The novel is set in Hobart, Tasmania, in 1845–46. It follows the last few months in the life of Judas Griffin Vaneleigh, a transported forger and suspected poisoner.

== Critical reception ==
A reviewer in The Canberra Times was not as enthusiastic as some of his colleagues: "Porter's baroque style gives his wordage full play. He spins his words like a thick spider's web and in the depths of the web he sets an evil collection of characters . . . They move dimly and poisonously in the mess of words like red-back spiders stirring in a thick web in a dark corner."

== See also ==
- 1961 in Australian literature

== Notes ==
- Dedication: With loving gratitude to my sister and brother-in-law, Ida and Alan Rendell
- The Oxford Companion to Australian Literature notes that the lead character is based on Thomas Griffiths Wainewright, although the author has changed some of the historical facts to fit his story. Porter did this story for radio with The Forger.
