= The Wargame =

2026 British TV series

- Genre: Docudrama
- Directed by: Ben Harding
- Country of origin: United Kingdom
- Original language: English
- No. of series: 1
- No. of episodes: 5

Production
- Executive producers: Nicola Brown; Tom Fulford
- Producers: Ella Taylor; Zehra Yas

Original release
- Network: Sky One
- Release: 21 September – 24 September 2026

The Wargame is a 2026 British television series produced by The Garden and broadcast on Sky One. The series premiered on 21 September 2026 and consisted of five parts. It was described as a "constructed documentary" combined with a "propulsive drama". It also has seen allegations of being state sponsored propaganda to manufacture consent for higher defence spending and war. The show was followed by a live edition with an audience.

== Background ==
The series was produced by The Garden, a production studio operated by ITV Studios. The series was developed alongside prominent academics, military and defence experts as well as Sky News' Security and Defence Editor Deborah Haynes to better replicate high-level decision-making.

== Plot ==
The series is based on a Sky News podcast of the same name. The plot of The Wargame revolves around a fictional Russian attack on the United Kingdom in 2027.

=== Episode 1 ===
The first episode begins with the Cabinet of the United Kingdom meeting in a Cabinet Office Briefing Room, referred to as a "COBRA meeting". The COBRA meeting is advised of three high-profile events that occurred overnight: two off-duty Royal Air Force F-35 Lightning fighter pilots were shot dead in a car park outside a pub in Lincolnshire; a cyber attack on NHS Yorkshire resulted in a failure of the computer systems used to manage ambulance responses; and a Russian research vessel has appeared off the coast of Orkney. The Russian oceanographic research vessel Orlan is located near a submarine communications cable and has not responded to Royal Navy and HM Coastguard attempts to contact them. Cabinet debate whether these three incidents are in fact linked, and whether to wait for certainty or act swiftly with partial information.

Closely followed by HMS Loughborough, the Russian vessel Orlan runs aground on rocks near Orkney, with the Royal Navy vessel starting a rescue effort. Social media posts from a nearby cargo ship show Russian sailors being loaded onto the British ship, with Orlan foundering close by. Russian news channels allege that the research vessel was intentionally destroyed as a result of the actions of the Royal Navy vessel, and demand that the captain of Loughborough be prosecuted. Cabinet refuses to do so, highlighting the suspicious actions of the ship. Meanwhile, police and intelligence reports confirm that the two pilots had been killed by a domestic organised crime network which was bankrolled by Russia. While considering how to respond, a Russian hunter-killer submarine sinks HMS Loughborough.

=== Episode 2 ===
The sinking of Loughborough results in the death of a large number of sailors. Rescue efforts continue, while the Foreign Secretary and Defence Secretary meet online with the NATO Secretary General, who informs them that the alliance led by the United States recommends not escalating. Amid the lack of an official response from the UK, Deputy Prime Minister Nicola Sturgeon is sent to present a press conference confirming the sinking of HMS Loughborough, and a significant loss of life. Microphones are fitted to the podium rather than her clothing, but a few minutes after the meeting a possible deepfake viral video emerges online, alleging a "hot mic" incident where she personally insults the U.S. President for supposedly appeasing Russia. In response, the U.S. President posts a social media message deprecating the UK and refuses to talk to the Prime Minister. The Foreign Secretary meets with an enraged U.S. Secretary of State, who confirms the American position of de-escalation with Russia, emphasising the UK's position as a middle power, that should not seek to antagonist a great power such as Russia.

A Royal Air Force P-8 Poseidon maritime patrol aircraft locates the Russian submarine that sank HMS Loughborough. After a brief debate in the COBRA meeting, the PM orders that the submarine be destroyed, which they then do. In response, Russia retaliates with ballistic and cruise missiles aimed at various military targets across the United Kingdom. The strikes result in significant damage, with only one Type 45 destroyer deployed to protect HMNB Clyde, as well as a handful of Sky Sabre air defence systems to protect air bases, leaving the cities largely undefended. While the majority of missiles hit legitimate military and government targets, one missile intended for the SIS Building strikes a residential tower block.

=== Episode 3 ===
A covert drone attack on several targets in the United Kingdom takes place, with an estimated forty drones launched from cargo trucks within British territory. A number of targets are hit, including a power station in Trafford, leaving GCHQ North and 600,000 homes without electricity, as well as a fuel depot at HMNB Portsmouth which severely immobilises the Royal Navy and necessitates an evacuation of Portsea Island.

With little support from NATO or the United States, the Prime Minister considers the possibility of strikes on strategic infrastructure in the Russian territories of Kaliningrad and Murmansk. A "Coalition of the Willing" is assembled, made up of Baltic and Scandinavian states. The Russian government accuses the United Kingdom of escalating the conflict into a full-scale European war. It issues an ultimatum stating that it is ready to cease hostilities, but only on the proviso that the current British government resign. Cabinet refuses to back down, stating that they would not bow to Russian pressure.

Social media posts calling for the government to resign increase, leading to protests throughout the country, which quickly turn violent. The intelligence services assess that they have reason to believe that Russia is attempting to stage a coup, through support for anti-government figures and the use of troll farms. Cabinet propose harsh measures such as invoking the Civil Contingencies Act and National Security Act to shut down the internet, take control of transport and media infrastructure and arresting political figures sympathetic to Russia, but consider that taking such moves would be perceived as against 'British values', and play into the Russian narrative.

Schools are closed, while reservists are mobilised and the National Health Service reserves hospital beds and blood. Emboldened by the further pledged support of Poland and Ukraine, who offer the capability of ATACMS tactical ballistic missiles and deep-strike drones, cabinet opt for a conventional strike option on both Kaliningrad and Murmansk simultaneously, in order to "humiliate" the Russians as much as possible.

=== Episode 4 ===
The strikes against Kaliningrad and Murmansk inflict heavy casualties on Russian forces. A battle damage assessment reveals that targets were hit in close vicinity to Russian nuclear weapons facilities. The Russian leadership relocates to secure facilities in the Ural Mountains, and in response, the British Cabinet evacuates London for their own secure bunker. Several cabinet members call for de-escalation, suggesting that the United States may be able to help. Instead, the U.S. Secretary of War berates them, asking what they expected after carrying out the strikes. France and Germany pledge to assist the UK, but social media shows the public divided. Some welcome the support of Europe, while others call for de-escalation amid shortages of basic goods. Riots and looting breaks out throughout the country, with many fleeing to the countryside or across the channel to mainland Europe.

Military intelligence identifies the transportation of at least one Oreshnik intermediate-range ballistic missile to the Kola Peninsula. The Oreshnik missile is capable of carrying either conventional or nuclear warheads and with a flight time of 22 minutes from the Kola Peninsula, the UK has no means of intercepting it if launched. If the missile were equipped with a tactical nuclear payload in the range of a Hiroshima scale explosion then that would destroy a city: however, if it were equipped with a strategic warhead then that could largely destroy the entire United Kingdom. This presents a quandary, as the UK nuclear deterrent has no tactical option, so any response would be strategic and escalatory. Cabinet assesses its options, proposing another series of strikes using F-35 stealth aircraft launched from Finland and Norway, including attempting to destroy the Oreshnik launcher in Murmansk. The European force begins moving assets to support the operation, including deploying supporting troops to Germany and sending the French aircraft carrier Charles de Gaulle to the North Sea. In response, the President of Russia announces that it has raised its forces to full nuclear readiness in response. On social media, public confidence in de-escalation evaporates completely. Due to a lack of organised shelters, many people escape to the wilderness or shelter in the London Underground. The UK appeals to the United States again for help to little avail.

As feared the launch of an Oreshnik missile is detected. It remains unclear whether it is carrying a nuclear warhead. The Prime Minister is asked whether he is ready to authorise the launch of the United Kingdom's strategic Trident missiles in response.

=== Episode 5 ===
The fifth episode, entitled The Wargame: Aftermath, never answers the cliffhanger question. Instead it is a studio-based discussion programme hosted by Cathy Newman with a live studio audience, in front of which members of the cast "reflected on the pressures of decision-making at the highest level and explored the wider questions raised from this thrilling documentary series". Newman prefaced the show by remarking that a number of the participants of the show have commercial interests in the arms industry.

==== Behind the scenes ====
Ayesha Hazarika and Nicola Sturgeon noted that responding to events in real time felt chillingly realistic. Sturgeon even mentioned dreamed about being chased by Russians following the show. Newman remarked that despite the political differences between the participants, the cabinet did not divide along party lines. Michael Gove noted that the simulated cabinet appeared to function better than in real-life. Addressing concerns about exposing UK vulnerabilities or engaging in jingoism, Deborah Haynes and Penny Mordaunt clarified that while Russia is likely well aware of the UK's hollowed-out armed forces, the goal was to educate the British public and politicians in the need to invest in defence.

==== Hybrid warfare ====
Panelists including Christopher Steele and Jim Murphy highlighted the state of hybrid warfare that exists between Russia and the United Kingdom, involving sabotage, assassination, arson and social media manipulation. Experts warned that the UK is not at war with Russia, but certainly not at peace, additionally citing threats from China and Iran. Christopher Steele and Keir Giles cautioned that failing to respond in kind could result in further miscalculation.Hazarika further highlighted the importance of misinformation as an extra dimension of war.

==== Military and social readiness ====
Newman raised the sobering prospect depicted in the show that Britain would not be able to fight Russia for longer than two weeks. Secretary of State for Defence Wes Streeting countered, claiming that the United Kingdom had the ability to assert deterrence through inflicting severe damage on Russia, while noting ongoing investments in air defence. Streeting dismissed the reintroduction of national service but stressed domestic readiness (such as through stockpiling food and water). General Richard Barrons expressed doubts on the governments optimising, referencing issues highlighted in the 2025 Strategic Defence Review and comparing the meagre size of the British Armed Forces in comparison to the Russian Armed Forces. Panelists noted the shift in the public narrative from the post Cold War concept of 'butter not guns', while Newman pointed out that major increases in defence spending would require the reduction of social welfare programs.

==== NATO and the United States ====
Sir Kim Darroch recalled the neutral position of the United States during the Falklands War, suggesting that it was foolish to always assume American support. Anthony Scaramucci suggested that the British monarchy is an example of continued soft-power influence in the US. Warsi argued that NATO remains strong, even without the US, emphasising that Britain's strategic value stems from the countries steadfast commitment to the liberal international order.

==== Conventional and nuclear warfare ====
Hazarika described the simulated impact of Russian nuclear weapons on the United Kingdom as harrowing. Sturgeon argued that conventional military capability should be prioritised over the nuclear budget, noting that Russia can inflict large-scale damage before reaching the nuclear threshold. Mordaunt, Gove and Murphy maintained that keeping a strategic nuclear force is vital to deter adversaries such as Russia or China through strategic ambiguity.

== Cast ==
The series features politicians from various political parties and well-known figures from outside government. They were opposed by a team of Russia experts led by Keir Giles. It also featured social media snippets of real life reactions.

| Participant | Role |
|---|---|
| Michael Gove | Prime Minister |
| Nicola Sturgeon | Deputy Prime Minister |
| Penny Mordaunt | Defence Secretary |
| Sayeeda Warsi | Attorney General |
| Harriet Harman | Home Secretary |
| Jim Murphy | Foreign Secretary |
| Ayesha Hazarika | Director of Communications |
| Richard Barrons | Chief of the Defence Staff |
| Kim Darroch | National Security Adviser |
| Christopher Steele | Intelligence Chief |
| George Robertson | Secretary General of NATO |
| Anthony Scaramucci | United States Secretary of State |

== Production ==
Sky was upfront about the heavy use of generative AI to produce scenes showcasing Russian attacks on targets in the United Kingdom. Fake TikTok clips from real-life influencers demonstrating the public reaction to government decisions were also used.

== Release ==
The first trailer for The Wargame was released on 9 September 2026. It was broadcast on Sky One from 21–24 September 2026 and consisted of five parts. It included a special live episode and was also released on the streaming service Now.

== Reception ==
In The Guardian review of the show, Lucy Mangan describes the show as "enjoyably terrifying" and "mind-warping". While noting the shows depiction of hybrid warfare, social media disinformation and crisis management, Mangan argues that its primary value lies in watching real-world politicians undergo a high-stakes trial on camera. She dismisses Michael Gove, Nicola Sturgeon and Harriet Harman as stiff, self-conscious and unconvincing, while praising Penny Mordaunt, Jim Murphy and Richard Barrons as decisive and charismatic. Mangan is particularly harsh on Nicola Sturgeon, describing her as an "alternately whining and furious goblin".

James Jackson of The Times describes The Wargame as a serious thriller that escalates into "borderline bonkers" territory, comparing the show to the American political series Designated Survivor. Jackson notes that the inclusion of an aloof and unpredictable President of the United States, and the appearance of American media personality Anthony Scaramucci threaten to break the illusion of reality, but nonetheless praises the show as "fun and terrifying." Nicola Sturgeon, penning an article in The Times stated that starring in the show had changed her view on the importance of defence spending.

Nicholas Harris of the New Statesman characterises The Wargame as "Michael Gove's fantasy alternative universe", noting that the show puts participants in cabinet roles more senior than they ever held in real life. Describing the show as "rather strange but not totally enjoyable", Harris suggests that the show may mostly appeal to those already plugged in to British politics.

Ros Taylor of The New World argues that while the show presents itself as a geopolitical thriller hypothesising a Russian attack on the United Kingdom, it propagates a narrative to manufacture public consent in support of increased defence spending. Taylor notes that the series demonstrates the friction between the state and ordinary citizens, who are shown largely ignorant of the looming threat, with opposition displayed on social media - making it clear that public opinion must be carefully curated in wartime. Taylor concludes that pacifists and Britons who have been affected by austerity would despise the show, viewing it either as a terrifying precedent or as blatant state-backed messaging.

Carl Kinsella of The Journal questioned the idea of putting real former politicians through a simulated Russian attack on the UK, saying that the show left more like a game show and revealed little about how a real attack may unfold. Kinsella states that a society where wargaming is being broadcast as mass entertainment is inherently unprepared for an actual hostile invasion.

The Wargame was praised by the Secretary of State for Defence Wes Streeting, for highlighting the need for greater defence spending. Streeting stated that the show would "play a role in making people think where they would put defence in the order of priorities as voters."

In response to the depiction of a strike on Kaliningrad and Murmansk in the show, as well as an article published by The i Paper on 26 September 2026 suggesting the de-recognition or blockade of Kaliningrad, the Russian Embassy to the United Kingdom issued a statement, warning that "Any British or NATO military action against Russian territory would be met with a response using all means at Russia's disposal, including nuclear weapons." The statement highlighted the irony of the show's fictional decision-making against real-world British military policy - pointing out that while the show depicts fictional attacks on British assets and territories, the UK has actually enabled strikes into Russian controlled territories amid the Russo-Ukrainian war through the supply of targeting intelligence and weaponry such as long-range Storm Shadow missiles to Ukrainian forces.

The show was condemned by several anti-war activist groups in the UK. Stop the War Coalition stated that it was horrific that Sky was making "light entertainment out of the drive to war". The Scottish Campaign for Nuclear Disarmament said that the "hype" around the show was a reminder on the close ties between the military, intelligence services and the media.

== See also ==
- By Dawn's Early Light – 1990 American television film directed by Jack Sholder
- A House of Dynamite – 2025 film by Kathryn Bigelow
- Crisis Command — a similar BBC2 series from 2004
