= The Diplomat (novel) =

1949 novel by James Aldridge

- First edition
- Author: James Aldridge
- Cover artist: P. Vinten
- Language: English
- Publisher: The Bodley Head
- Publication date: 1949
- Publication place: United Kingdom
- Media type: Print (Hardback)
- Pages: 728 p.

The Diplomat is a 1949 novel by the Australian writer James Aldridge.

== Synopsis ==
The book tells the story of three British diplomats, while they set out for a journey to get acquainted with the situation in Iranian Azerbaijan and Iranian Kurdistan on the brink of the Cold War.

== Critical reception ==
A reviewer in The Sydney Morning Herald was in two minds about the book: "James Aldridge's excellent reporting, his knowledge of his subject, his ambitious aim, and his lively treatment of adventures with the Kurds, help to compensate for the stiff characters and the great length of the novel."

In The Bulletin the reviewer was slightly more positive: "That so many themes with such popular and contemporary appeal should be so well worked together argues a shrewd mind, and probably the politics have been shrewdly adjusted to mirror a contemporary and popular dream rather than the realities of the international situation."

== Publishing history ==
After the novel's initial publication in the UK by The Bodley Head, the novel was reprinted as follows:

- Little, Brown, USA, 1950

The novel was also translated into German, Italian, Swedish, Czech, Hebrew and Bulgarian in 1951, Dutch, Slovak, Russian, and Flemish in 1952, Polish and Chinese in 1953, Albanian in 1965, Slovak in 1978, Estonian in 1979, Hungarian and Azerbaijani in 1981, Kurdish in 1984, and Latvian in 1988.
