= The Last Inch =

- Russian: Последний дюйм
- Directed by: Nikita Kurikhin; Teodor Vulfovich
- Written by: James Aldridge; Leonid Belokurov
- Produced by: S. Goloshchekin
- Starring: Vladislav Muratov; Nikolai Kryukov; Mikhail Gluzsky; Aliagha Aghayev; Mukhlis Dzhanni-zade; Aleksey Rozanov
- Cinematography: Samuil Rubashkin
- Edited by: Elena Bazhenova
- Music by: Moisey Vaynberg
- Production company: Lenfilm
- Release date: June 10, 1959
- Running time: 89 min
- Country: Soviet Union
- Language: Russian

The Last Inch (Russian: Последний дюйм, romanized: Posledniy dyuym) is a 1959 Soviet adventure drama film directed by Nikita Kurikhin and Teodor Vulfovich. It is based on an eponymous short story, by James Aldridge published in the USSR in 1957, and in London in 1960.

== Plot ==
The film is about unemployed Ben Ensley, a professional pilot, who decides to take dangerous underwater photographs of sharks to make money, and goes with his son Davy, who had to persuade him to come along, as Ben initially intended to go alone, to a distant shark bay. While taking the pictures, Ben gets bitten by a shark and bleeds heavily. The only chance for him to survive is to fly back to the small African town they set off from.

Davy carries his father into the plane and then follows his instructions to take off from the beach and follow the route back. But the most complicated and dangerous part of the flight is the landing. Ben Ensley, who's half-conscious from loss of blood, instructs his son about the last inch that he must feel when landing a plane.

The last inch could also refer to the thin margin between life and death for the Protagonists.

== Cast ==
- Vladislav Muratov as Davy (as Slava Muratov)
- Nikolai Kryukov as Ben Ensley (voiced by Yuri Tolubeyev)
- Mikhail Gluzsky as Gifford
- Aliagha Aghayev as cafe owner
- Mukhlis Jani-Zade as mechanic (voiced by Sergey Yursky)
- Aleksey Rozanov as doctor

== Music track ==
- «Ben's Song», lyrics by Mark Sobol, music by Mieczysław Weinberg) was performed by Mikhail Ryba.
- The English variant entitled I don't care about your staff was created in 2025 by Viatcheslav Yatsko
