= The Dyehouse =

Book by Mena Calthorpe

- Author: Mena Calthorpe
- Language: English
- Genre: Fiction
- Publisher: Ure Smith, Sydney
- Publication date: 1961
- Publication place: Australia
- Media type: Print
- Pages: 218 pp
- ISBN: 0868060259
- Preceded by: –
- Followed by: The Defectors

The Dyehouse (1961) is the debut novel by Australian writer Mena Calthorpe.

== Story outline ==
The novel is set in a textile dye factory in a drab Sydney industrial suburb. It follows the interacting stories of the men and women who work at the Southern Textiles Dye Work in the mid-1950s.

== Critical reception ==
Joyce Halstead in The Australian Women's Weekly noted some shortcomings but found: "Though there is a groping for the subtleties which would make the characters more convincing, the style is simple and precise and the backgrounds are handled with freshness and skill."

In The Canberra Times, the reviewer also found first novel problems but saw the worth in the end product: "She has considerable skill as a writer, her great strength appears to be story construction. When she stops fascinating herself with her own clever prose, throws away her thesaurus, and gets down to telling a story simply, economically, and honestly she may well be a force to be reckoned with on the Australian literary scene."

== See also ==
- 1961 in Australian literature

== Notes ==
Text Publishing re-issued the novel in 2016 as a part of their Text Classics series.
