= Fire and Sleet and Candlelight =

1961 poetry anthology

- Dust-jacket illustration by Gary Gore for Fire and Sleet and Candlelight
- Author: edited by August Derleth
- Cover artist: Gary Gore
- Language: English
- Genre: Fantasy, horror, speculative poetry
- Publisher: Arkham House
- Publication date: 1961
- Publication place: United States
- Media type: Print (Hardback)
- Pages: xix, 236 pp

Fire and Sleet and Candlelight was a poetry anthology edited by August Derleth, and published in 1961 by Arkham House in an edition of 2,026 copies. The title was suggested to Derleth by Lin Carter and is taken from the Lyke-Wake Dirge. For this companion volume to Dark of the Moon: Poems of Fantasy and the Macabre, Derleth included only living poets or poems that had not been previously published.

== Reprints ==
- Freeport, NY: Books for Libraries Press, 1973.
