= 1874 in Australian literature =

This article presents a list of the historical events and publications of Australian literature during 1874.

== Books ==
- Rolf Boldrewood — My Run Home
- Mary Anne Broome — Sybil's Book
- Marcus Clarke — Chidiock Tichbourne, or The Catholic Conspiracy
- Maud Jean Franc — John's Wife
- Henry Kingsley — Reginald Hetherege

== Short stories ==
- Marcus Clarke — "Gipsies of the Sea, or The Island of Gold"

== Poetry ==
- Catherine Martin— The Explorers and Other Poems
- Henry Kendall
  - "Rover"
  - "Song of the Shingle Splitters"
  - "The Voice in the Native Oak"

== Births ==
A list, ordered by date of birth (and, if the date is either unspecified or repeated, ordered alphabetically by surname) of births in 1874 of Australian literary figures, authors of written works or literature-related individuals follows, including year of death.

- 22 April — James Francis Dwyer, short story writer (died 1952)
- 19 May — Will M. Fleming, politician, novelist and poet (died 1961)
- 31 August — Ambrose Pratt, novelist (died 1944)
- 17 September — Walter Murdoch, academic and essayist (died 1970)
- 17 October — Lionel Lindsay, artist and essayist (died 1961)
- 23 December — Marie Bjelke Petersen, novelist (died 1969)
- 26 December — J. H. M. Abbott, poet and novelist (died 1953)

== See also ==
- 1874 in Australia
- 1874 in literature
- 1874 in poetry
- List of years in Australian literature
- List of years in literature
