= The Forger (radio play) =

Australian radio play

- Genre: play drama
- Running time: 60 mins
- Country of origin: Australia
- Language: English
- Syndicates: ABC
- Written by: Hal Porter
- Directed by: Leslie Rees
- Original release: 1964

The Forger is a 1964 Australian radio play by Hal Porter about Thomas Griffiths Wainewright.

Wainewright's life was previously adapted for Australian radio in Portrait of a Gentleman and Porter had fictionalised Wainewright's life in his novel The Tilted Cross.

The radio play was produced again in 1965, 1972, 1973, 1978, 1983 and 1985.

Leslie Rees wrote "According to the thesis advanced by Porter, it was Wainewright’s covetous, bitchy and calculating wife who looked after the three mysterious killings in England for which Wainewright himself has traditionally taken the brunt of blame. So in the play the wife bulked just as large as did Thomas, possibly more so. On the A.B.C., The Forger made a telling, unpredictable hour."
