= Ayesha Hazarika, Baroness Hazarika =

Scottish broadcaster and journalist (born 1975)

The Right Honourable The Baroness Hazarika MBE
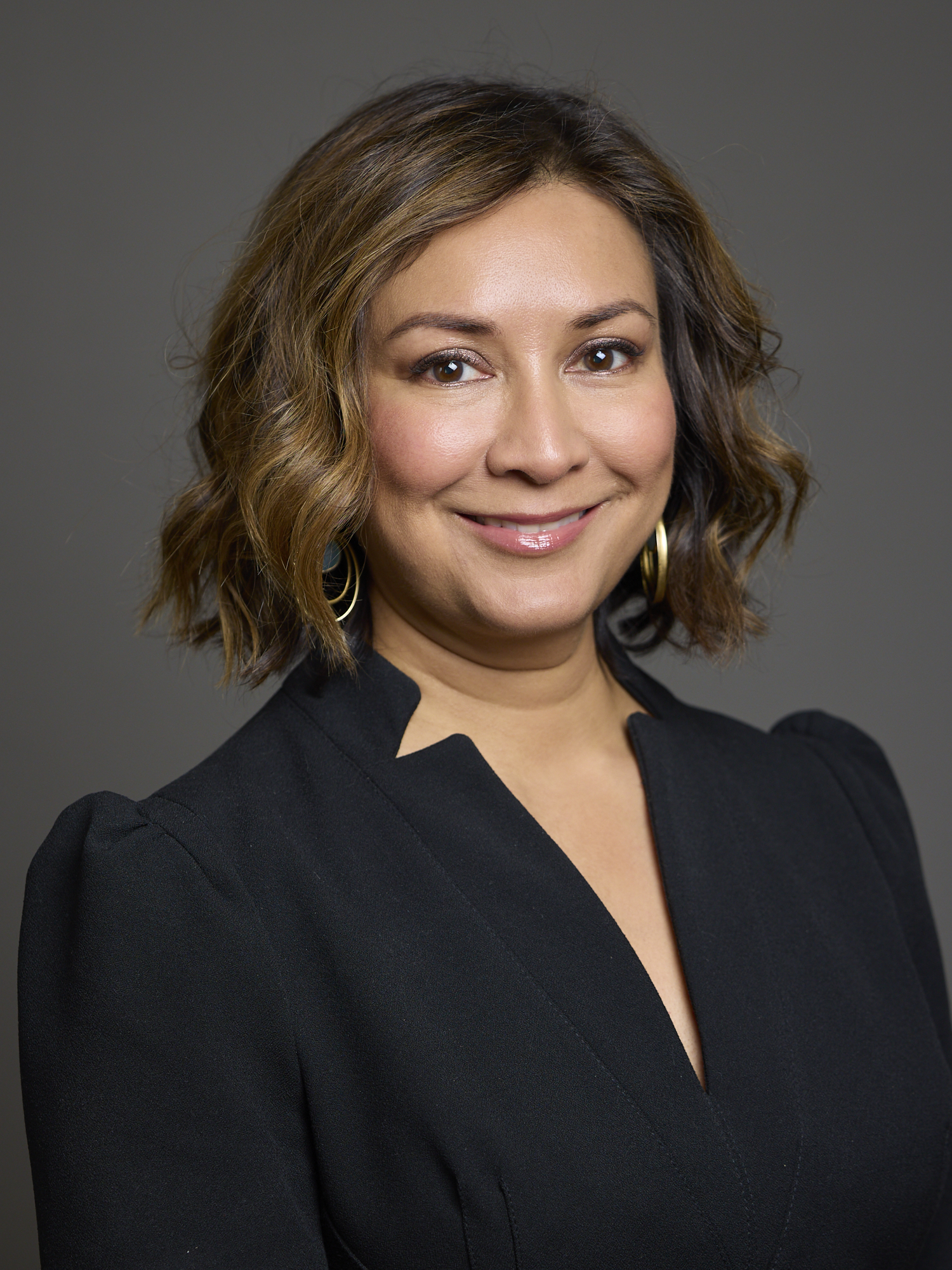
- Official portrait, 2024

Member of the House of Lords
- Lord Temporal
- Life peerage 14 March 2024

Personal details
- Born: Ayesha Yousef Hazarika; 15 December 1975 (age 50) Bellshill, North Lanarkshire, Scotland
- Party: Labour
- Spouse: Grant Tucker
- Education: Laurel Bank School, University of Hull (LLB)
- Occupation: Broadcaster; journalist; former political adviser

Ayesha Yousef Hazarika, Baroness Hazarika, (Note: Assamese: আয়েশ্বা ইউছুফ হাজৰিকা, Assamese pronunciation: [ae̯ʃa iu̯suf ɦazɔɹika].) MBE (born 15 December 1975) is a Scottish politician, political commentator and former political adviser to senior Labour Party politicians.

== Early life ==
Hazarika was born in Bellshill Maternity Hospital, North Lanarkshire, Scotland, to Indian Muslim parents who had immigrated from Assam. She was raised in Coatbridge. She was educated at Laurel Bank, an all-girls private school in Glasgow, and studied law at the University of Hull.

== Career ==
Hazarika has worked for EMI's Chairman and in the Civil Service as a press officer at the Department of Trade and Industry (DTI). She also liaised with the Stephen Lawrence family during the Macpherson Inquiry. Latterly she works on the after dinner speaking circuit and is regularly invited by BBC, Sky and ITV to commentate on political issues in the news.

Originally, she had planned to train as a solicitor before deciding to focus on journalism.

== Comedy ==
While working at the DTI, Hazarika was persuaded by a friend to take a comedy course run by comedian Logan Murray. She began to perform paid comedy gigs alongside her day job at the DTI. In 2003, she was a semi-finalist in the Channel 4 stand-up comedy competition So You Think You're Funny, but chose to focus on her work as a political adviser.

After leaving politics, Hazarika performed a stand-up show at the Edinburgh Festival Fringe in 2016, inspired by her time in politics. The following year, she tried again with a new show, State of the Nation, in Edinburgh. In December 2018, Hazarika appeared on series 56 episode 10 of Have I Got News for You as Ian Hislop's teammate, a role she reprised in May 2020 during the "Lockdown" series.

== Political adviser and commentator ==
From 2007 to 2015, Hazarika served as a political adviser to senior Labour Party figures, including Harriet Harman and Ed Miliband, including during the 2010 and 2015 general elections. After leaving her role working for Harman in the aftermath of the 2015 general election, Hazarika was appointed Member of the Order of the British Empire (MBE) in the 2016 New Year Honours for political service. It was reported at the time that Harman had proposed Hazarika for a life peerage, but Miliband instead elevated another former adviser (Spencer Livermore) to the House of Lords.

Describing herself as a "moderate" within the Labour Party, Hazarika urged Jeremy Corbyn to resign after the Copeland by-election in early 2017. Following the 2017 general election, in which Labour gained seats, she acknowledged that she had "got it wrong on Corbyn", and urged her "fellow Labour colleagues to acknowledge Corbyn's success and to try to find peace with him".

After departing Westminster, Hazarika tried standup and provides commentary in the media. She has written columns for The Scotsman and the Evening Standard. In 2017, commentator Iain Dale put her at 75 on his list of the "100 Most Influential People on the Left". In 2018, she co-authored a book Punch and Judy Politics: An Insiders' Guide to Prime Minister’s Questions with fellow Labour speechwriter and special adviser Tom Hamilton.

In June 2020, she was one of the launch presenters of the Times Radio digital radio station, presenting Saturday and Sunday drivetime shows.

Hazarika was nominated for a life peerage by Labour leader Sir Keir Starmer, and was created Baroness Hazarika, of Coatbridge in the County of Lanarkshire, on 14 March 2024.

In 2026, Hazarika took part in a TV series called The Wargame, hosted by Cathy Newman, in which members of the cast "reflect on the pressures of decision-making at the highest level and explore the wider questions raised from this thrilling documentary series".
