= Thomas Griffiths Wainewright =

19th-century English and Australian artist

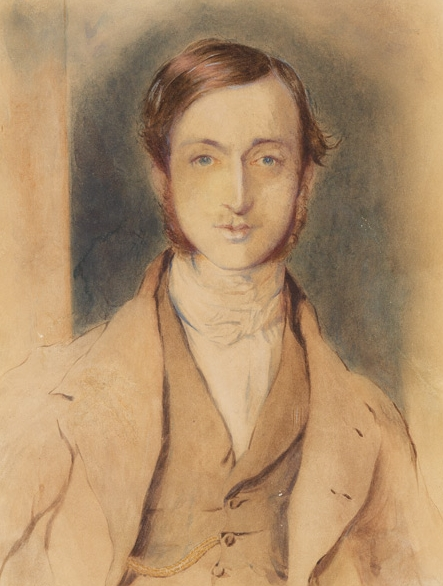
- Self-portrait, 1825
- Born: October 1794; Richmond, Surrey, England
- Died: 17 August 1847 (aged 52); Hobart Town, Van Diemen's Land

Thomas Griffiths Wainewright (October 1794 – 17 August 1847) was an English artist, author and suspected serial killer. He gained a reputation as a profligate and a dandy, and in 1837, was transported to the penal colony of Van Diemen's Land (now the Australian state of Tasmania) for frauds on the Bank of England. As a convict he became a portraitist for Hobart's elite.

Wainewright's life captured the imagination of renowned 19th-century literary figures such as Charles Dickens, Oscar Wilde and Edward Bulwer-Lytton, some of whom wildly exaggerated his supposed crimes, claiming among other things that he carried strychnine in a special compartment in a ring on his finger.

== Early life ==
Thomas Griffiths Wainewright was born into affluence in Richmond, London, England. He was orphaned when he was very young, his mother dying in childbirth and his father soon afterwards. Wainewright's mother Ann was the daughter of Ralph Griffiths (1720–1803), for many years the editor of the literary magazine Monthly Review. The young Wainewright was brought up in style by his elderly maternal grandparents at Linden House, Chiswick High Road, Chiswick, then on London's rural periphery. When Griffiths died, Wainewright came under the care of his maternal uncle, George Griffiths. He was probably educated by the scholar Charles Burney, the headmaster of the Greenwich Academy.

Wainewright subsequently served briefly as an officer in a yeomanry regiment, having bought his commission in 1814, but lasted just over a year, probably because of a severe mental illness.

== Literary career ==
In 1819, Wainewright embarked on a literary career, and began to write for The Literary Pocket-Book, Blackwood's Magazine and The Foreign Quarterly Review. He was, however, most closely linked with The London Magazine, to which he contributed articles and art criticism from 1820 to 1823, under the pen names Janus Weathercock, Egomet Bonmot and Cornelius van Vinkbooms. Wainewright's success in publication would have been assisted by his famous grandfather. He was a friend of Charles Lamb, who thought well of his writing and, in a letter to Bernard Barton, styles him "the kind, light-hearted Wainewright." Wainewright also practised as an artist and was trained by John Linnell and Thomas Phillips. He produced a portrait of Lord Byron and made illustrations for the poems of William Chamberlayne, and from 1821 to 1825 exhibited narratives based on literature and music at the Royal Academy, including Romance from Undine, Paris in the Chamber of Helen and the Milkmaid's Song. None of these works have survived.

In the 1960s, the controversial author Donald McCormick claimed that Wainewright was a friend of William Corder, the murderer of Maria Marten in the Red Barn Murder in Polstead, Suffolk in 1827. It was claimed that the two met when Corder visited London and joined some intellectual circles. McCormick was unable to produce any evidence for his claims when asked by the author of a 2018 biography of Wainewright.

== Marriage and family life ==
On 13 November 1817, Wainewright married Eliza Frances Ward. He had inherited £5,250 from his grandfather, invested at the Bank of England, but was unable to touch the capital, receiving only the dividends of £200 a year; the capital was in trust for his family, Eliza and their son Griffiths. However, his extravagant lifestyle landed him in colossal debt. On two separate occasions, Wainewright forged signatures of power of attorney and withdrew large sums from the Bank of England, first in 1822 and then in 1823. The second time left the account empty.

By 1828, the Wainewrights were in severe financial trouble again and forced to move in with the elderly George Griffiths, still living at the Wainewright estate in Chiswick. Griffiths died in agony shortly afterwards. Eliza's mother married again, becoming a Mrs Abercromby, and had two further daughters, Helen and Madalina, before being widowed again. They too moved into the estate, and Mrs Abercromby settled her will in favour of Eliza. She died shortly afterwards.

== The death of Helen ==
Owing to his extravagant habits, Wainewright remained mired in debt. In 1830, he and Eliza insured the life of his sister-in-law Helen with various companies for a sum of £16,000 (some £1,650,000 in 2016). She died in December of the same year after showing signs of strychnine poisoning, though at that time there was no forensic test to prove it. When the insurance companies sued, Wainewright fled to Calais to avoid investigation of his uncovered bank frauds. Unproven tales by Victorian authors claimed that he was seized by the authorities as a suspected person and imprisoned for six months. He had in his possession a quantity of strychnine, and was widely suspected to have poisoned not only his sister-in-law and his uncle, but also his mother-in-law and a Norfolk friend, although this was never proven. He returned to London in 1837, but was soon arrested on a charge of the bank forgery. Wainewright was sent to Hobart, Van Dieman's Land (now Tasmania) on the convict ship Susan, arriving 21 November 1837. While in prison he was asked if he poisoned Helen, to which he allegedly replied: "Yes; it was a dreadful thing to do, but she had very thick ankles." The quotation is now thought to have been made up by Oscar Wilde's publisher.

== Late life ==
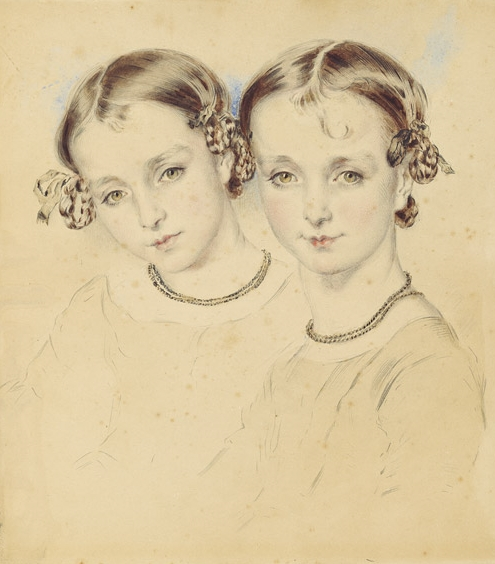
The Cutmear Sisters, Jane and Lucy, c. 1842, National Gallery of Australia

During his ten years in the penal colony, Wainewright did eventually enjoy a certain amount of freedom. After initially working on a road gang, he became a hospital orderly and was able to work as an artist, painting portraits in the homes of his subjects. He completed more than 100 portraits on paper using coloured wash, pencil and ink during his years in Hobart. They survive in public museums and private collections throughout Australia, some having remained in the families of his sitters. They depict the officialdom, professionals and members of the elite in early Hobart. A self-portrait was completed in this period. Wainewright had a conditional pardon granted on 14 November 1846; he died of apoplexy in the Hobart Town hospital on 17 August the following year. He is buried in an unknown grave.

== Legacy ==
The Essays and Criticisms of Wainewright were published in 1880, with an account of his life by W. Carew Hazlitt.

The history of his crimes suggested to Charles Dickens his story "Hunted Down" and to Edward Bulwer-Lytton, 1st Baron Lytton his novel Lucretia.

Wainewright's personality, as artist and poisoner, also interested Oscar Wilde in his "Pen, Pencil and Poison" (Fortnightly Review, Jan. 1889), and A. G. Allen, in T. Seccombe's Twelve Bad Men (1894).

Arthur Conan Doyle mentions Wainewright in the Sherlock Holmes story "The Adventure of the Illustrious Client" (1924) as "no mean artist", but spells his name without the middle "e".

His life was dramatised in the 1940 Australian radio play Portrait of a Gentleman where he was played by Peter Finch.

In 1961, Australian writer Hal Porter published an historical novel about Wainewright, entitled The Tilted Cross. Porter also wrote a radio play about him, The Forger.

Wainewright has been the subject of several biographical studies:

- The Fatal Cup: Thomas Griffiths Wainewright and the strange deaths of his relations by John Price Williams (Markosia, London 2018) which re-examines the poisonings and reaches a different conclusion as to Wainewright's guilt
- Janus Weathercock, by Jonathan Curling (Thomas Nelson and Sons, London, 1938)
- Wainewright in Tasmania, by Robert Crossland (OUP, Melbourne, 1954)
- Wainewright the Poisoner, a creative biography by poet Andrew Motion (2000)

Wainewright was the subject of the seventeenth episode of the television show Thriller, "The Poisoner" (aired 10 January 1961), with Murray Matheson playing the role of the killer (given the fictional name Thomas Edward Griffith) and featuring Sarah Marshall as his wife.

== See also ==
- List of convicts transported to Australia
- List of serial killers by country

== Bibliography ==
- Peter Macinnis (2005). Poisons: From Hemlock to Botox and the Killer Bean of Calabar. Arcade Publishing. pp. 18–20. ISBN 1-55970-761-5.
- Ian H. Magedera (2014). Outsider Biographies; Savage, de Sade, Wainewright, Ned Kelly, Billy the Kid, Rimbaud and Genet: Base Crime and High Art in Biography and Bio-Fiction, 1744–2000. Amsterdam and New York, Rodopi. pp. 115–119 and 121–149. ISBN 978-90-420-3875-2.
- Donald McCormick, The Red Barn Mystery:some new evidence on an old murder (South Brunswick, New York: A.S.Barnes and Co., 1967).

== Online sources ==
- Serle, Percival (1949). "Wainewright, Thomas Griffiths". Dictionary of Australian Biography. Sydney: Angus & Robertson.
- A Thomas Griffiths Wainewright page
