= Time on Fire =

Book by Thomas Shapcott

- Contents page for Time on Fire (1961)
- Author: Thomas Shapcott
- Language: English
- Genre: Poetry collection
- Publisher: Jacaranda press
- Publication date: 1961
- Publication place: Australia
- Media type: Print
- Pages: 88 pp
- Preceded by: –
- Followed by: The Mankind Thing

Time on Fire (1961) is the debut collection of poems by Australian poet Thomas Shapcott. It won the Grace Leven Prize for Poetry in 1961.

The collection includes 61 poems by the author that are reprinted from various sources, although some are published here for the first time.

== Contents ==
- "Sonnet"
- "River Scene"
- "Denmark Hill"
- "The Fifth of November"
- "Late Winter, Queensland"
- "Lake Swans"
- "At Night, Footsteps"
- "The Sleeping Trees"
- "Columbine"
- "Mt. Flinders"
- "Hawk"
- "Water Skier"
- "Mt. Glorious"
- "Blue Mountains After Rain"
- "Virgin Forest, Southern New South Wales"
- "The Waves"
- "Beyond My Love"
- "Time on Fire"
- "The Finches"
- "Evergreen"
- "Skin Diver"
- "Winter Westerlies"
- "Autumn Grasses"
- "White Cedar in Winter"
- "Idyll"
- "Dead House in the Hills"
- "The Lake in Winter"
- "Rhapsody on the Shortest Day"
- "Stranger in the City"
- "Woman in the Bar"
- "American Sailor in Hyde Park"
- "Aspect of Truth : A Small City Park"
- "Suburb"
- "New Australian in the Park"
- "At Neutral Bay"
- "La Glutton, in Suburb"
- "Lullaby"
- "Song"
- "Traditional Song"
- "Secrecy"
- "Spring"
- "Music at Night"
- "High Tide"
- "At the Bay"
- "Lonely Bay"
- "Beyond Any Bright Dexterity"
- "Goodbye Message"
- "Message to London"
- "Return"
- "Car Journey"
- "Reunion (Nocturne)"
- "Sheep Country in Spring"
- "In Your Lands
- "Windy Hill"
- "Sonnet for an Engagement"
- "Genesis"
- "At North Head, Late Spring"
- "Love Poem Written after Rain"
- "On the Beach"
- "Bells (Three extracts from a Marriage Sequence)"
- "Content"

== Critical reception ==
While reviewing a subsequent volume of poems in The Canberra Times, the critic T. Inglis Moore noted: "In his initial Time on Fire he emerged as a fresh and lively lyricist, with a flexibility of rhythms that reminded one of Dylan Thomas. He tackled urban and rural themes alike with sensitivity and a sharp, reflective intelligence. In his first book and its successors there were, however, certain weaknesses – sometimes the fluidity fell into facility or looseness, the originality into word play for its own sake, the search for meanings into obscurity."

The Oxford Companion to Australian Literature referred to the collection as being "largely autobiographical, reflecting the country boy's distaste for the garish city environment; the wakening of young love; courtship, marriage, parenthood; and a preoccupation with transience."

== See also ==
- 1961 in Australian literature
- 1961 in poetry
