= The Last Exile =

Book by James Aldridge

- Author: James Aldridge
- Language: English
- Genre: Fiction
- Publisher: Hamish Hamilton, London
- Publication date: 1961
- Publication place: Australia
- Media type: Print
- Pages: 790 pp
- Preceded by: I Wish He Would Not Die
- Followed by: A Captive in the Land

The Last Exile (1961) is an historical novel by Australian writer James Aldridge.

== Story outline ==
The novel is set in Egypt before, during and after the Suez Crisis of 1956. A number of prominent players in the crisis, including Australian Prime Minister, Robert Menzies, and Egypt President Gamal Abdul Nasser, appear as characters in the book.

== Critical reception ==
A reviewer in The Canberra Times noted the risks of writing about so recent an event, and then worried about the length of the book: "In any fictional treatment of a controversial and still remembered incident of history, it is almost impossible for the writer to avoid taking sides with some of his characters...Although Aldridge introduces many characters into his story and draws a canvas with numerous events, it would seem he has overdone it by letting it go on for 790 pages."

Kirkus Reviews called it a "fascinating, fast-moving novel of modern political intrigue", and concluded: "Although the narrative, even journalistic, style of the book leaves little room for deep character study, its people are alive, believable, and will draw sympathy and interest from a large audience. Dramatic history of recent times is made into very worthwhile fiction."

== See also ==
- 1961 in Australian literature
