= Starting from San Francisco =

First edition (publ. New Directions)

Starting from San Francisco is a collection of poems by Lawrence Ferlinghetti, his third collection and fourth book, published in 1961. The hardcover edition included a short vinyl recording of Ferlinghetti reading some of his poems. The title is a reference to Walt Whitman's "Starting from Paumanok": Ferlinghetti numbered himself among Whitman's "wild children", and Whitman's influence is shown throughout the work.

The poems are based mainly on a journey across the United States and a meditation on the Inca city of Machu Picchu, a photograph of which is shown on the cover. The poetry mingles tenderness with satire and hallucination. Scattered through the book is some of the better poetry generated by the San Francisco School. The poems are longer and more sustained than in his previous publications. They are more concerned with ideas than with verbal glitter, singing out boldly with great clarity.

The poem "Euphoria" starts:

As I approach the state of pure euphoria
I find I need a large size typewriter case
to carry my underwear in
and scars on my conscience
are wounds imbedded in
the gum eraser of my skin
which still erases itself...

Perhaps the best known of the poems is "The Great Chinese Dragon", although one critic says that the Remedial-English style of this poem makes one doubt that Ferlinghetti would ever be able to write poetry again. Gregory Stephenson, incorporating quotes from "The Great Chinese Dragon", says the dragon "… represents 'the force and mystery of life,' the true sight that 'sees the spiritual everywhere translucent in the material world.'" Perhaps what Ferlinghetti wants his reader to do is to see the jazz music and the everyday images and the repetitive references to common culture found in his poems; and then see beyond them to "the spiritual everywhere translucent."

== Publication history ==
- 1961, USA, New Directions Publishing, Hardcover
- 1967, USA, New Directions Publishing, ISBN 0-8112-0046-9, Paperback
