= Literary Pocket-Book =

1818 collection of works edited by Leigh Hunt

The Literary Pocket-Book was a collection of works edited by Leigh Hunt and containing material by Hunt, Percy Bysshe Shelley, John Keats, and Bryan Waller Procter. The collection was put together during 1818, and proved so successful that Hunt was able to sell the copyright for £200 a year later. The collection includes written worked, lined pages to write notes on and lists of authors, artists, schools and libraries. It was a public success, bringing new readers to both Shelley and Keats, and served as a model for other collections of poetry written during the Victorian era. Critical reviews were also excellent, with The London Magazine describing it as "for the most part delightfully written", although Keats himself later wrote that the collection was "full of the most sickening stuff you can imagine".

== Background ==
During the end of 1818, Hunt was putting together a collection to be called Literary Pocket-Book. The works were a combination of material provided by himself, Percy Bysshe Shelley, John Keats, and Bryan Waller Procter. By 1823, there were five collections under the title. The collection was successful enough that Hunt, needing money, was able to sell Ollier the copyright for £200 during mid-1819. Works included in the Literary Pocket-Book were later reprinted in Hunt's magazine, Indicator, in 1821. They were also printed in collections by individual poets.

== Poems ==
The book contains many lined pages that could be used to write notes. It also contains lists of names according to various categories, from authors and artists to schools and libraries. Many of the writers listed were Romantics. The lists of authors continued after the 1823, into the annual diary as "A Chronological List of Eminent Persons in Letters, Philosophy, and the Arts, whose great original genius, individual character, or reputation with posterity, has had an influence in modifying the taste and opinions of the world". The first list in the later version contained only 28 names of those from the 18th-century.

Hunt's "Calendar of Nature" was included in the collection after it was originally printed in the Examiner. The poem describes the artistic connections to each of the months, descriptions of festivals, and a discussion about nature. Two of the poems were sonnets written by Keats for the collection. These poems were "Four Seasons" and "To Ailsa Rock".

== Critical response ==
The work was popular, brought new readers to both Keats and Shelley, and set a model for later collections of poetry popular during the Victorian period. A review in the December 1819 Blackwood's Edinburgh Magazine claimed, "we propose now doing a truly wonderful thing-namely, in good earnest to laud a production of Mr Leigh Hunt's [...] is a very clever and cunning contrivance. A common almanack is most shockingly vulgar, and cannot be worn by a gentleman in the evening. But the Literary Pocket-Book, though a sort of almanack, is quite dressy-looking with its scarlet coat".

An 1821 review in The London Magazine argued, "This 'Calendar of Birthdays' is an interesting essay (or rather collection of essays), and is for the most part delightfully written [...] The 'Miscellanies' consist of a very clever and interesting paper called 'Walks round London;' and various pieces of original poetry [...] We must now shut up the Literary Pocket-Book, recommending it, however, to our readers, partly for its original matter, and partly for its Lists [...] which [...] are really invaluable and are to be found in no other publication whatever." The Literary Gazette, after an 1828 publication of the work, stated, "The first title of this pocket-book, which has been popular for some years, obtained from us a favourable notice on the even of its publication, of which we do not repent now that we see it in its perfect form. Of some of the original matter, we cannot say much, except it may be intended (in a new sense) for the lovers of art." However, not everyone was in favour of the work; Keats, in a letter to his brother George, claimed that the work containing two of his own poems was "full of the most sickening stuff you can imagine".

In 1930, Edmund Blunded stated, "This characteristic little invention was the now unprocurable Literary Pocket-Book, from the surviving sets of which it is to be wished that a facsimile might be published. It was at once practical and vacational [...] It must be concluded that this little Pocket-Book, for all Hunt's protests, [...] for all Keats's harsh comments [...] was a respectable worker in the cause of making the quality of Shelley and Keats known". He concluded that "It could be dreamed that there was a new England in which Leigh Hunt might for ever be employed in making Literary Pocket-Books for use, delight, and ornament, so that no fightful knocks on the door and final demand-notes might break upon his flowery and serene work of national importance."

Ann Blainey, in 1985, claimed, "Dear to Hunt's heart, it was an inoffensive calendar and memorandum book with original prose and poetry, fascinating anecdotes, and lists of practical or unusual facts to inspire and instruct his readers."
