= Kathleen Dalziel =

Australian writer

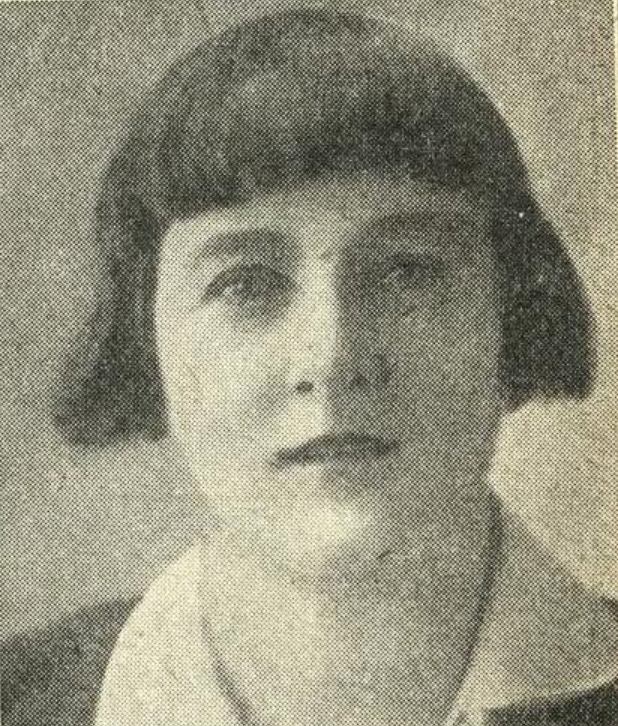
- Dalziel as a young woman
- Born: 1881; Durban, Colony of Natal
- Died: 1969 (aged 87–88); Ivanhoe, Victoria
- Occupation: poet
- Writing career
- Language: English
- Years active: 1898 –
- Notable works: Known and Not Held : Verses (1941)

Kathleen Dalziel (1881–1969) was an Australian writer who was born in Durban, Colony of Natal in 1881. Born Laura Kathleen Natalie Walker, she arrived in Australia with her family in 1887, where they lived in an isolated area south of Burnie in north-west Tasmania. The family moved to Colac, and later, Melbourne where she remained for the rest of her life. Her first marriage was to Frank Womersley at Dunkeld in 1903. After divorcing him in 1921, she married William Brown Dalziel.

Dalziel was a prolific writer of poetry who regularly contributed to The Bulletin. She published her first work in 1898 in The Tasmanian Mail, but it was not until the mid-1920s that she began to gain wider recognition. She was a founding member of the Melbourne P.E.N. Club and was, at various times, a member of Australian Literary Society, and also the Fellowship of Australian Writers.

She published only one small collection of her poetry during her life, Known and Not Held : Verses, in 1941. She died in Ivanhoe, Melbourne, in 1969.

== Bibliography ==
- Known and Not Held : Verses (1941)
