= James Aldridge =

Australian-British writer and journalist

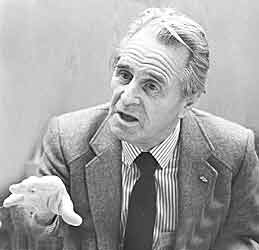
- James Aldridge (1987, Berlin)
- Born: Harold Edward James Aldridge; 10 July 1918; White Hills, Victoria, Australia
- Died: 23 February 2015 (aged 96); London, England, U.K.
- Occupations: Writer and journalist
- Writing career
- Language: English
- Genres: Fiction and non-fiction
- Subjects: War and adventure novels
- Notable works: Signed with Their Honour; The Sea Eagle; The Hunter; Heroes of the Empty View
- Notable awards: World Peace Council Gold Medal, 1953; Lenin Peace Prize, 1972; Gold Medal for Journalism from the International Organization of Journalists, 1972; Order of Friendship of Peoples (USSR, 1988)

Harold Edward James Aldridge (10 July 1918 – 23 February 2015) was an Australian-British writer and journalist. His World War II despatches were published worldwide and he was the author of over 30 books, both fiction and non-fiction works, including war and adventure novels and books for children.

== Life and career ==
Aldridge was born in White Hills, a suburb of Bendigo, Victoria. By the mid-1920s the Aldridge family had moved to Swan Hill, and many of his Australian stories are based on his life growing up there. He studied at the London School of Economics. He returned to Australia and worked for The Sun News-Pictorial in Melbourne from 1935 to 1938. In 1938 Aldridge moved to London, which remained his base until his death in 2015.

During the Second World War, Aldridge served in the Middle-East as a war correspondent, reporting on the Axis invasions of Greece and Crete. Based on his experiences, he wrote his first novel Signed with Their Honour and the book was published in both Britain and the United States in 1942, becoming an immediate best-seller. The novel centred on a fictional young British Royal Air Force pilot named John Quayle who flies obsolete Gladiator biplanes for the true-life 80 Squadron against the larger and more powerful Axis air-forces over Greece, Crete and North Africa 1940–41. American critic Herbert Faulkner West stated that the book "showed real promise" and ranked it the best of his wartime novels. The book proved to be one of Aldridge's most successful, remaining in print until 1988. An attempt in 1943 to make a film based on the novel was abandoned when two Gloster Gladiator biplanes were destroyed in a mid-air collision during filming at an RAF base at Shropshire in the UK.

His second novel The Sea Eagle (1944), which centred on Australian soldiers during and after the fall of Crete in 1941, was also successful but received less favourable reviews than his first book. American critic N. L. Rothman, however, writing in the Saturday Review, praised the novel for its "timeless-ness" and the high quality of its prose. Aldridge's early novels were heavily influenced by the literary mannerisms of US author Ernest Hemingway. For The Sea Eagle, Aldridge won the John Llewellyn Rhys Prize.

Aldridge's most successful and most widely published novel The Diplomat was released in 1949. An espionage and political drama set amidst the Azerbaijan Revolution in Iran, the novel received mixed reviews. The Anglo-Soviet Journal called it "absorbing and impressive". An American review for Kirkus, however, while acknowledging the book's premise to be promising and original, labelled it as slow, repetitive and awkward in style.

His 1950 novel The Hunter proved that Aldridge was willing to attempt a variety of genres and settings. A drama about fur-hunters living in the wilds of the Ontario bushlands in Canada, the novel was, according to Walter O'Meara in the Saturday Review, written in a "flat direct prose that just when you decide to be bored straightens you up with an incisive and revealing word or phrase." He went on to say it was "a sincere and occasionally penetrating study of man against the eternal odds".

Aldridge's next book appeared in 1954, a novel entitled Heroes of the Empty View, depicting an English hero-adventurer in the Middle-East in the vein of T. E. Lawrence and Charles Gordon. The novel was well received by Walter Havighurst, writing in the Saturday Review, who called it "a provocative novel...written with authoritative knowledge of men, machines and politics". A review for Kirkus Reviews praised the novel as being "perhaps his most important work, and implicit in its picture of the conflicts, the contradictions, the dilemmas of the Arabs....There is a wider view of the battle for freedom in a world where a machine-ruled society is becoming the norm".

Aldridge returned to the Second World War with his next novel, I Wish He Would Not Die (1957), a drama set in the Desert Air Force in Egypt. Kirkus Reviews labelled it as an effective work, dealing with "men living under stress and with a heightened sense of humanity present the issues that haunt them..." Aldridge's direct experiences of Egypt, where he lived for much of the Post-War era, both as a Foreign Correspondent and later as a novelist, inspired the 1961 novel The Last Exile, set amidst the turbulence of the Suez Crisis in 1957. The novel, one of Aldridge's most lengthy and most ambitious, drew a less favourable response than previous works. Hal Lehrman, writing in the Saturday Review, labelled it "a swollen bore".

Aldridge continued to draw inspiration from topical events and the Cold War tensions between the East and West gave him the subject for his next novel A Captive in the Land (1962), set in the frozen wastes of the Arctic where an English scientist rescues the sole survivor of a crashed Russian aircraft. Like all of his politically themed works, Aldridge attempted to explore all viewpoints and portray the "grey" area in-between opposing forces and beliefs. In this case, the Englishman is initially viewed by his fellow Westerners as a hero but later he is treated with increasing suspicision due to his efforts to allow the Russian to be freed. W. G. Rogers, writing in the Saturday Review, praised the novel thus: "...the moral adventure here is more challenging and better and faster reading than the physical. But all the way its a gripping story that gets under your skin and stays there." The novel was made into a film of the same name in 1993.

From the mid-1960s, many of Aldridge's works were written for children and young adults and a number of his later works were set in his homeland of Australia. His 1966 novel My Brother Tom was set in the fictional Australian town of St Helen, closely based on the town of Swan Hill by the Murray River where he spent much of his childhood. This novel, the first in a series of six set in St Helen, while a novel that portrayed a love story between two young people, explored moral and political dilemmas and ideas, in this case the severe tensions between the town's Catholic and Protestant citizenry. The novel became a TV mini-series in 1986, starring Gordon Jackson and Keith Michell. Another of the St Helen series, The True Story of Lilli Stubeck, was the 1995 Children's Book Council of Australia book of the year. His 1973 children's novel A Sporting Proposition was adapted as the 1975 Disney film Ride a Wild Pony.

In 1971 he was a member of the jury at the 7th Moscow International Film Festival. Aldridge won a Lenin Peace Prize in 1972 for "his outstanding struggle for the preservation of peace". That year he also won the gold medal for Journalism from the Organisation for International Journalists. He has also won the World Peace Council Gold Medal. For The True Story of Spit Macphee (Viking, 1986) he won the annual Guardian Children's Fiction Prize, a once-in-a-lifetime book award judged by a panel of British children's writers.

== Works ==
- Signed with Their Honour (Brown, Little & Co, 1942)
- The Sea Eagle (Michael Joseph, 1944), winner of the John Llewellyn Rhys Prize, 1945
- Of Many Men (Michael Joseph, 1946)
- The Forty-Ninth State (1946)
- The Diplomat (Bodley Head, 1949)
- The Hunter (Bodley Head, 1950)
- Heroes of the Empty View (Bodley Head, 1954)
- Undersea Hunting for Inexperienced Englishmen (Allen & Unwin, 1955)
- I Wish He Would Not Die (Bodley Head, 1957)
- The Last Exile (Hamish Hamilton, 1961)
- A Captive in the Land (Hamish Hamilton, 1962)
- My Brother Tom (Hamish Hamilton, 1966)
- The Statesman's Game (Hamish Hamilton, 1966)
- The Flying 19 (Hamish Hamilton,1966)
- Cairo - Biography of a City (1969)
- Living Egypt, with Paul Strand (1969)
- A Sporting Proposition (Ride a Wild Pony) (Little Brown, 1973)
- Mockery in Arms (Little Brown, 1974)
- The Marvellous Mongolian (Macmillan, 1974)
- The Untouchable Juli (Little Brown, 1975)
- One Last Glimpse (Michael Joseph, 1977)
- Goodbye Un-America (Michael Joseph, 1979)
- The Broken Saddle (Julia Macrae, 1982)
- The True Story of Lilli Stubeck (Hyland House, 1984)
- The True Story of Spit Macphee (Viking, 1986), winner of the Guardian Prize and New South Wales Premier's Literary Award
- The True Story of Lola Mackellar (Viking, 1992)
- The Girl from the Sea (Penguin, 2002)
- The Wings of Kitty St Clair (Penguin, 2006)

== In cinema ==
- The Last Inch (1958), a Soviet film based on the eponymous short story by Aldridge
