= Masters in Israel =

Poetry collection by Vincent Buckley

- Author: Vincent Buckley
- Language: English
- Publisher: Angus and Robertson
- Publication date: 1961
- Publication place: Australia
- Media type: Print (hardback)
- Pages: 57
- Preceded by: Poems
- Followed by: Essays in Poetry, Mainly Australian

Masters in Israel (1961) is the second collection of poems by Australian poet Vincent Buckley. It won the ALS Gold Medal in 1962.

The collection consists of 25 poems, with seven appearing here for the first time.

== Contents ==
- "Late Tutorial"
- "Criminal Court"
- "Various Wakings"
- "Willow and Fig and Stone"
- "Reading to My Sick Daughter"
- "Didactic Song"
- "Sinn Fein: 1957"
- "To Praise a Wife"
- "Borrowing of Trees"
- "Before Pentecost"
- "Catullus at Thirty"
- "Wedge-Tailed Eagle"
- "Four Stages of Evening"
- "Anzac Day"
- "Walking in Ireland"
- "To Brigid in Sussex (from Cambridge)"
- "Master-Mariner"
- "Father and Son"
- "Song for Resurrection Day"
- "To the Blessed Virgin"
- "Colloquy and Resolution"
- "Spring is the Running Season"
- "Impromptu (for Francis Webb)"
- "Movement and Stillness"
- "In Time of the Hungarian Martyrdom"

== Critical reception ==
A reviewer in The Canberra Times praised the technique of the work while also intimating something else. "Buckley, who is an erudite and polished academic lecturer carries a Jesuit-trained care of scholarship into his verse. He looks for significance in human relationships and this is reflected in the topics chosen and his treatment of them. His poems have a satisfying lucidity of expression and an evenness of execution, for he is a most careful craftsman."

Originally delivered as a paper during Writers' Week at the 1989 Perth Festival, and subsequently reprinted in Westerly magazine, Vincent O'Sullivan's survey of Buckley's poetry noted: "In terms of belief, then, of commitment, of the expectations of language, those poems in Masters in Israel are a far cry from the position he described a few weeks before his death as that of a 'Catholic agnostic'. One might say of course that the more important word there is still Catholic, the sense that the adjective abides while the noun is provisional."

== See also ==
- 1961 in poetry
