= Nikolai Kryukov (actor) =

- Born: Nikolai Nikolaevich Kryukov; 8 July 1915; Zamytye, Tver Governorate, Russian Empire
- Died: 17 April 1993 (aged 77); Saint Petersburg, Russia
- Occupation: actor
- Years active: 1936–1992
- Spouse: Lilia Gurova
- Awards: Honored Artist of the RSFSR

Nikolai Nikolaevich Kryukov (Russian: Никола́й Никола́евич Крю́ков; 8 July 1915 – 17 April 1993) was a Soviet film and theater actor, Honored Artist of the RSFSR (1991).

== Biography ==
Nikolai Kryukov was born on July 8, 1915, in Zamytye, a village in Tver Province, USSR. Both of his parents were farmers. Young Kryukov was fond of silent films. In 1930, he decided to become an actor and moved to Leningrad. During the 1930s he was industrial worker at the Sevkabel plant in Leningrad. At that time he also attended acting classes at the Bolshoi Drama Theatre (BDT) in Leningrad, graduating in 1935 as an actor. From 1936 - 1941 he was permanent member of the troupe with Sergei Radlov's theatre, then at Lensoveta Theatre in Leningrad. In 1940, Kryukov made his film debut in 'Politruk Kolyvanov' (1940), but the film was not completed due to the German invasion of the USSR.

Kryukov worked as actor during the Siege of Leningrad. In the beginning of 1942, he was evacuated from besieged Leningradd to the city of Pyatigorsk. There he was arrested by the advancing Nazi Army and was taken to Germany as a POW. In Germany, Kryukov worked as actor until liberation at the end of WWII. He was then returned to the Soviet Union along with five million other POWs.

After the war, Kryukov undergone interrogation by the Red Army intelligence and the KGB, before he was allowed to work again as a stage actor with various theatre companies in such cities as Tbilisi, Tver, Rostov, and Riga. However, he was restricted from working in Leningrad until after the death of the Soviet dictator Joseph Stalin a series of political changes were initiated in the Soviet Union by Nikita Khrushchev. In 1958 Kryukov returned to Leningrad and became staff actor at the Lenfilm Studios. He was regarded for his roles in such films as 'The Andromeda Nebula' (1967), 'Girl and Grand' (1982), and in the popular Russian series about Sherlock Holmes.

Nikolai Nikolaevich Kryukov was married to fellow actress Lilia Gurova and the couple lived in St. Petersburg, Russia in the final years of his life. He was designated Honorable Actor of Russia (1992) and was a highly respected actor in Russia. He died of a heart failure on April 30, 1993, and was laid to rest in Serafimovskoe Cemetery in St. Petersburg, Russia.

== Selected filmography ==
- The Ships Storm Bastions (1953)
- The Last Inch (1958)
- Virgin Soil Upturned (1959–61)
- A Trip Without a Load (1962)
- Clean Ponds (1965)
- The Andromeda Nebula (1967)
- Strong with Spirit (1967)
- The Sannikov Land (1974)
- In the Zone of Special Attention (1978)
- Aquanauts (1979)
- The Adventures of Sherlock Holmes and Dr. Watson (1980)
- Treasure Island (1982)
- Anna Pavlova (1983)
- Sofia Kovalevskaya (1985)
- The Left-Hander (1987)
