= Hal Porter =

Australian writer (1911–1984)

- Born: Harold Edward Porter; 16 February 1911; Albert Park, Victoria, Australia
- Died: 29 September 1984 (aged 73)
- Occupations: Novelist; playwright; poet; short story writer

Harold Edward "Hal" Porter AM (16 February 1911 – 29 September 1984) was an Australian novelist, playwright, poet, and short story writer. He is known for his 1963 memoir, The Watcher on the Cast Iron Balcony. The Hal Porter Short Story Competition continues to honour his name, awarding a prize of $1000 to the writer of a short story each year.

== Early life and education ==
Harold Edward Porter was born on 16 February 1911 in the Melbourne suburb of Albert Park, Victoria, the eldest child of six. His parents, both in Victoria, were railway employee Harold Owen Porter and Ida Violet (née Ruff). They first lived at 36 Bellair Street, Kensington. He moved with his family to Bairnsdale when he was six, and grew up there. He was always known as "Hal". While at school in Bairnsdale, he started doing creative writing, getting pieces published in school magazines.

== Career ==
After leaving school, Porter worked briefly as a journalist on the Bairnsdale Advertiser. He also worked as a cook, actor, hotel manager, and hospital orderly at different times.

He moved to Williamstown and became a school teacher in 1927. He taught at a number of private schools, including in Adelaide, South Australia. He published his first collection of short stories in 1942, called Short Stories. He was appointed senior English master at The Hutchins School in Hobart, Tasmania, from 1946, but was dismissed within a year. He stayed on in Hobart, coaching matriculation students and directing Hamlet at the Theatre Royal. In 1949–1950 he taught with the Allied occupation forces in Japan. After this, he returned to Australia, including spells in Hobart between 1951 and 1953. He later wrote works reflecting his time in Hobart, including the play The Tower (1963), and an historical novel, The Tilted Cross (1961), about convict Thomas Griffiths Wainewright. He regarded the latter as his best work to date.

Porter worked as a librarian from 1953 to 1961, before becoming a full-time writer. His first short stories were published in The Advertiser in Adelaide in 1953. He returned to Japan for a visit in 1967, which led to writing a non-fiction work The Actors (1968), and the short story collection Mr Butterfry and Other Tales of New Japan (1970).

He also published collections of poetry, including The Hexagon (1956), Elijah's Ravens (1968), and In an Australian Graveyard (1974).

His plays Eden House and Toda-San (The Professor) were staged in London as well as in Australia. The Tower was performed in March 1964 at Hampstead Theatre Club in London, and in the ABC studios for television on 2 December 1964.

His 1963 autobiography in three volumes, which includes The Watcher on the Cast-Iron Balcony (1963), The Paper Chase (1966), and The Extra (1975), covering his life up until the 1970s, is regarded as his masterpiece.

His novels, which included A Handful of Pennies (1958), The Titled Cross (1961), and The Right Thing (1971), were less successful than his short stories or memoir. The literary critic Laurie Clancy said: "Porter's novels are, with one exception, less successful than his stories, not least because his scorn for most of his characters becomes wearying over the length of a novel." The exception, Clancy thought, was The Tilted Cross, a historical novel set in Hobart in the 1840s.

== Themes and critical reception ==
In his work, Porter explores themes of loss of innocence, illusion, and love. In some short stories, he writes nostalgically of childhood experiences. He also uses satire and social criticism.

Writer Colin Roderick saw in Porter's work the influence of George Moore and Katherine Mansfield, as well as the French poets and writers Théophile Gautier, and Charles Baudelaire. However many critics see his poetry as "derivative and lacking in originality".

The Tilted Cross was considered his most substantial work by many critics.

== Honours and awards ==
In 1967 Porter was awarded the Britannica-Australia Literary Award. In 1970, he was awarded second prizes in both the Novel and Short Story categories of the Captain Cook Bicentenary Awards, and in 1977 he won the Fellowship of Australian Writers Local History Award for his book Bairnsdale : Portrait of an Australian Country Town.

In the 1982 Queen's Birthday Honours Porter was made a Member of the Order of Australia (AM) for service to literature.

== Personal life ==
Porter married in 1939, and in the same year was hospitalised for a year following a severe traffic accident. This prevented him from serving in the armed forces in World War II. He divorced in 1943.

== Death and legacy ==
On 24 July 1983 he was knocked down by a hit-and-run driver in Ballarat and suffered severe brain damage. After lying in a coma for 14 months he died on 29 September 1984. The driver of the vehicle was fined $500, $150 for failing to stop after the accident and $100 for failing to give his name and address.

After Porter's death, his friend Mary Lord, who had full access to his papers, published a biography of Porter called Hal Porter: Man of Many Parts in 1993. This biography, while praising his literary accomplishments, also focuses on some negative aspects of Porter's personality. Earlier, she edited a collection of his writing (Hal Porter, 1980), writing in her introduction that Porter was an oddity in Australian literature, owing to his styles and experimentation in a number of genres.

A portrait of Porter painted by his friend William Dargie in 1934 was kept by Porter until 1966, when it was sold to the State Library of New South Wales, along with literary papers.

=== Hal Porter Short Story Competition ===
The life and work of Porter was honoured from around 1992 (or 2006?) through the annual Hal Porter Short Story Competition, under the auspices of the and the Hill of Content Bookshop and the East Gippsland Art Gallery, in Bairnsdale, Victoria. In 2020 it offered a national prize of $1000 for the winner, and book prizes and certificates are offered for shortlisted stories. The competition has also been sponsored by a number of other sponsors. The competition is no longer running. (Note: Source: Email from East Gippsland Art Gallery. (16 May 2025; User: Laterthanyouthink))

== Bibliography ==
Poetry

- The Hexagon (1956)
- Elijah's Ravens (1968)
- In an Australian Graveyard (1974)

Novels

- A Handful of Pennies (1958)
- The Tilted Cross (1961)
- The Right Thing (1971)

Short story collections

- A Bachelor's Children (1962)
- Short Stories (1942)
- The Cats of Venice (1965)
- The Actors: An image of the new Japan (1968)
- Mr. Butterfry and Other Tales of New Japan (1970)
- Selected Stories (1971)
- Fredo Fuss Love Life (1974)
- The Portable Hal Porter (1978)
- The Clairvoyant Goat (1981)

Memoirs

- The Watcher on the Cast-Iron Balcony (1963)
- The Paper Chase (1966)
- Criss-Cross (1973)
- The Extra (1975)

Local History

- Bairnsdale: Portrait of an Australian country town (1977)

Drama

- The Tower (1963)
- The Forger (1964)
- Toda-San, or The Professor (1965?)
- Eden House (1969)
