= Israel Emiot =

Yiddish-language poet and writer

Israel Emiot (1909 – March 7, 1978) was the pen name of Israel Goldwasser or Israel Yanofsky, a Yiddish poet and writer who was born in what is now Poland, later lived in the Soviet Union, and spent his last two decades in Rochester, New York.

== Life ==
Emiot was born in 1909 in Ostrów Mazowiecka, then part of Congress Poland within the Russian Empire. The town became part of independent Poland after World War I. His father emigrated to the United States in 1919, but his mother stayed behind. Emiot published his first writing in 1926, and brought out four books of poetry during the 1930s.

When Germany invaded Poland in 1939, Emiot and his wife and children fled east to the Soviet Union; his mother remained and was killed during the war. In 1944, he was sent to work as a journalist in Birobidzhan, the autonomous region set up for Jews in Siberia. Within a few years, as the climate for Jewish writers in the Soviet Union worsened, he was convicted of trumped-up crimes and sentenced to ten years of hard labor, which he served at a camp near Taishet.

After his release, he returned to Poland, and soon after emigrated to the United States, where his wife and children were living in Rochester. He spent his last decade and a half as writer-in-residence at Rochester's Jewish Community Center.

== Writings ==
Emiot published twelve volumes of poetry in Yiddish from 1932 to 1969. He also collaborated on translations of some of his poems in the early 1970s, including "A Prayer - 1943". A prose memoir of his time in Birobidzhan was translated into English by Max Rosenfeld and published in 1981. In 1991, poet Leah Zazulyer brought out a translation of Emiot's poems about his time in Siberia including a biographical introduction, and in 2015 she published translations of selected poetry from various times in Emiot's life.

== Works ==
- Israel Emiot, The Birobidzhan Affair: A Yiddish Writer in Siberia, translated by Max Rosenfeld (Philadelphia, 1981). ISBN 0827601913
- Israel Emiot, As Long As We Are Not Alone: Selected Poems, translated and introduced by Leah Zazulyer (Rochester, N.Y.: Tiger Bark Press, 2015). ISBN 9780986044557
