= Keir Giles =

British writer and academic (born 1968)

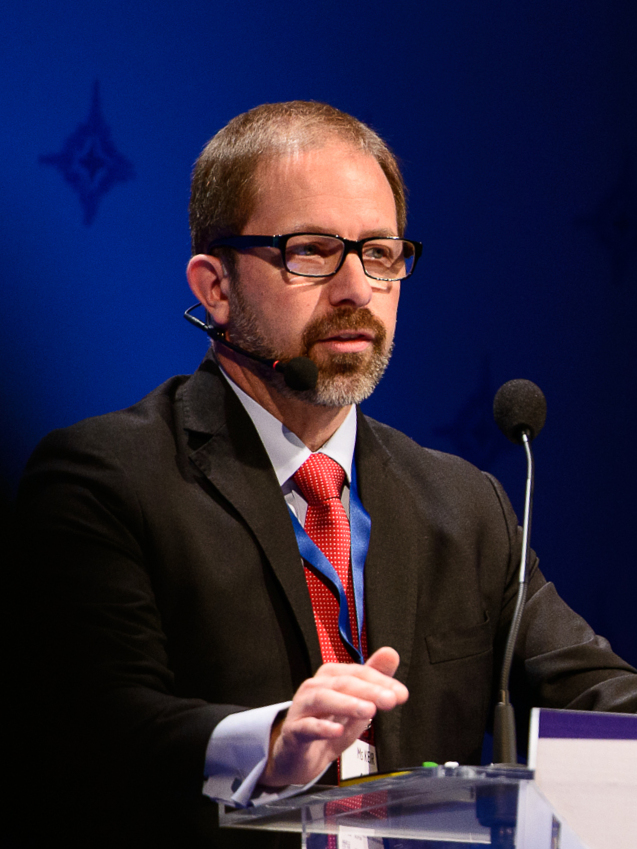
Image of Keir Giles

Keir Giles (born 26 January 1968) is a British writer who is considered an expert on the Russian military. He has written multiple books on the geopolitical conflict between the West and Russia such as NATO's Handbook of Russian Information Warfare published through NATO Defense College. Giles has commented extensively on the Serdyukov reforms^{§}, Russian disinformation^{§}, and the Russo-Ukrainian war^{§}.

== Career ==
Giles has written on security issues affecting Russia and on the Armed Forces of the Russian Federation. He wrote for the Defence Academy of the United Kingdom's Advanced Research and Assessment Group, is a research director with the Conflict Studies Research Centre, which is a group of subject matter experts in Eurasian security, and is a senior consulting fellow in the Russia and Eurasia program at Chatham House. He was educated at Orley Farm School, Winchester College and UCL School of Slavonic and East European Studies. Before his academic career, he underwent pilot training in the Royal Air Force, and briefly worked as a stand-up comedian and actor, appearing in A Captive in the Land and other productions by Gorky Film Studio. Giles also worked for the Defence Academy of the United Kingdom, the BBC Monitoring service, and Ernst & Young in Moscow. He is the author of multiple books about the Russian approach to warfare and related security issues affecting Russia and the Russian Armed Forces.

In June 2019, Giles became suspicious of and helped to uncover Katie Jones, a supposed expert of American politics that did not exist but was an AI-generated face, and was part of "a vast army of phantom profiles lurking on the professional networking site Linkedin" in the words of the Associated Press. In his works, such as Russia's War on Everybody (2022), which is based on interviews with forty people across a dozen countries, Giles argued that for years Russia has been waging "a clandestine war against the West". In Moscow Rules: What Drives Russia to Confront the West (2019), he argued that leaders of the Western world repeated the same mistakes in their relations with Russia, and pushed forward a series of recommendations that gives the book its title. He is also the author of a NATO report on Russia's information warfare.

In 2026, Giles took part in a TV series called The Wargame, hosted by Cathy Newman, in which members of the cast "reflect on the pressures of decision-making at the highest level and explore the wider questions raised from this thrilling documentary series".

== Commentary and analysis ==
Giles is considered an expert on the Russian military, and has extensively commented on Russian-related issues, such as the Russo-Ukrainian War, and its developments, such as Russia's offensive in eastern Ukraine, the United States sending a Patriot missile defense system to Ukraine, and the West's plan to send tanks to Ukraine. He has also discussed hybrid warfare and sees the threat of sabotage against submarine communications cables as a possible further vector of aggression by Russia against NATO. He said that the capabilities of the former are "well-developed ... not just to locate and interfere with cables, but also to tap into them for espionage purposes."

=== Russian Armed Forces ===
In April 2014, Giles said that "this is a very different Russian army from that seen during the Georgia war of 2008". Despite victory in the Russo-Georgian War, Russia's military performance was underwhelming, and he said that this "was a post-Soviet army, not much changed from the 1980s, and designed for a very different form of combat". Even before the reforms of 2008, modernisation plans had been under way. Giles commented: "Serious lessons were learnt in terms of organisation, command and control, equipment, and especially inter-service co-operation. Communications between ground and air units were a major problem, due to a lack of effective forward air controllers properly embedded with ground units, and several of the Russian air losses were apparently shot down by their own side." In December 2014, about the war in Georgia, he said: "The Georgia war was seen by the West as a setback for Moscow, but by the Russians as a success. Mr Putin has secured the Russian information space and has now set up an alternative reality which is gaining some modest traction, even in the West." In September 2017, about the Russian Zapad military exercise in Belarus, he said that "previous Russian exercises on this scale have prepositioned troops for undertaking military operations, against Georgia in 2008 and against Ukraine in 2014, and both of those moves were precipitated by an immediate political crisis – currently absent in Europe. And there have been plenty of other major Russian exercises in between, which did not end up with somebody getting invaded."

Improvements were noted in the units employed during the takeover of Crimea in 2014. Giles said: "In the last couple of years, there have been indications, even in military parades in Moscow, that this is a more Western-looking army. New load-carrying equipment for ordinary soldiers and a wider distribution of personal radios – until recently the preserve of platoon commanders at best – are simple and obvious indications of how the Russian army has invested in improving and modernising its equipment overall." Despite shortcomings, Giles stated that "today the Russian military is vastly more capable than it was in 2008 and much more capable than certainly the Ukrainians – and superior to the forces currently deployed on the territory of all of its Western neighbours". He expressed his belief that Russia could sustain their military threat to Ukraine for some considerable time, saying: "The Russian units deployed on Ukraine's eastern border can probably remain in the field longer than many Western planners assume. Russia is not much concerned at inconvenience or short-term financial costs if it makes long-term strategic gains. Many indicators and warnings of preparation for a possible invasion are in place, including logistics, food supplies, medical services, and interior troops which would be used for control of occupied areas. But this is not necessarily an indication that Russia will invade, simply that Russia wishes to be prepared to do so given the opportunity or the perceived necessity." He argued that Moscow went to considerable lengths to be in a position to act, stating: "Prior to the crisis coming to a head, every major amphibious assault ship Russia had in Europe was pre-positioned in the Black Sea, with units moved thousands of miles from both the Baltic and the Northern Fleets."

=== Russian disinformation ===
In September 2014, Giles said that the Federal Security Service, Russia's principal security agency, had been given new internet surveillance powers since American whistleblower Edward Snowden exposed the scale of secret United States monitoring of internet traffic. In October 2015, about the possibility of Russian submarines cutting off the internet, he said: "I very much doubt that anyone would think of cutting off the US. It is only going to work in locations where the internet geography is going to create a vulnerability in communications." He added that other countries might consider it viable to do so, and said that "Internet infrastructure needs the same kind of protection at times of crises as other strategically important infrastructure." About Ukraine's telecoms providers reporting disruptions during Russia's 2014 military activity in the Crimean peninsula, which is mentioned as an incident in a Chatham House report on Russian information war tactics that was published in 2016, he said: "They can interfere with internet infrastructure in order to gain [complete] control of [the information available in] specific regions. It does make sense given the intense programme of submarine building, including some very specialised vessels. It wouldn't be surprising that they would want to do this."

In March 2017, Giles said that techniques of information warfare and non-military intervention in the early decades of the 21st century showed new features. He commented: "At various stages in the first and second Chechen wars, the war with Georgia in 2008, Russia found it was not able to influence global opinion or the opinion of its adversaries at an operational or strategic level, and made significant changes to its information warfare apparatus as a result." According to Giles, Russia "is becoming less and less interested in covering its tracks". About the Russian interference in the 2016 United States elections, he argued that it was more or less overt, and said that Russia was happy to permit a dozen Western journalists to report on a notorious Saint Petersburg troll farm "partly because of a sense of urgency that the next conflict is coming".

=== Russo-Ukrainian War ===
In June 2017, Giles dismissed the view that Russia's militarisation and preparations for conflict were a response to NATO doing the same. He said: "Russia's enormously expensive reorganisation and rearmament programme was already in full swing well before the crisis over Ukraine, while NATO nations were still winding down their militaries. As late as 2013, the US withdrew all its armour from Europe – while Russia was already busy investing billions in upgrading its forces." In a December 2021 interview to the Italian news agency AGI, he defined the Kremlin's list of requests to NATO as a "Christmas list". In January 2022, Giles said that the British warning was a sign of "the U.K. effectively taking the lead of a strong NATO and European response to Russia's threats to Ukraine". He added: "With the U.S. apparently willing to engage with Russia's demands on Moscow's terms, and the EU irrelevant and asleep at the wheel, it has fallen to the U.K. to deal with the challenge both in terms of rhetoric ... and in terms of direct action, raising the likely cost of a Russian incursion in Ukraine by providing direct shipments of defensive munitions."

In October 2020, Giles said that a stronger Russian military presence in Belarus would alter the geopolitics of Europe. He said: "The presence of Russian forces in Belarus — along with the air and missile forces they could be expected to bring with them — would substantially alter the security situation for a wide area of Central Europe. Popular scenarios for Russian military adventures such as a move on the Suwałki gap — the strip of Polish-Lithuanian border separating the exclave of Kaliningrad from the rest of Russia — would no longer be several geopolitical steps away." In January 2022, citing long-range missile attacks or cyber-attacks targeting critical infrastructure due to Ukraine's weaker anti-missile defences, Giles said: "The different scenarios for how exactly Russia might seek to persuade the West to meet its (security) demands by punishing Kyiv don't even necessarily include a land incursion."

In February 2022, amid the military buildup to the invasion of Ukraine, Giles stated that Russia is "swift to label its adversaries and victims in Europe as Nazis. We have seen this not only in Ukraine, but also in Russia's vilification of the Baltic states." In March 2022, a week after Russia invaded Ukraine, he said that the Russian campaign was rapidly developing in ways he described as "eerily familiar" to Putin's deadly battle of Grozny (1999–2000) during the Second Chechen War. He stated: "We need to prepare for a humanitarian catastrophe now. We have to assist Ukraine in holding out as long as possible, but with eyes wide open to what this will mean for the Ukrainian population." In June 2022, about the possibility of a ceasefire on the Russian side, Giles said: "This is a ploy which could be used by Russia at any time, if it wants to capitalise on European pressure on Ukraine to surrender and give up territory in exchange for notional peace."

In September 2022, days before the 2022 Russian mobilisation was announced, Giles argued that declaring mobilisation would be unpopular; he also said that this would require declaring the military operation a war, which would be an admission that the invasion was not going as planned and that they are not winning. In December 2022, Giles stated that predictions or denials of a new offensive were based on "whether people are applying Western standards of readiness" to Putin's military. He added: "Russia has undertaken one wave of mobilization and is quite capable of undertaking more. We would be more likely to see a better organized, even if low-tech, offensive from Russia in the early stages of next year."

In March 2023, about Russia–China relations within the context of the war in Ukraine, Giles said: "So far, China has had the luxury of being able to sit back and watch the war to see who comes out on top." He cited a number of possible outcomes from Xi Jinping's trip to Russia, including definitive moves that could point to two directions, such as direct support for Putin in the conflict or explicitly calling on him to end it. He said that both would be "an indication that China has reached a decision on how the war will affect the balance of power between Russia and the West in the long term. It could be that neither of those will happen, and we'll continue to hear words of partnership not backed up by visible action." About the May 2023 Russian withdrawal from the CFE Treaty, Giles said it is "only a formality", and added: "It is only a show. In reality, it has no impact. Russia stopped following the treaty in 2007 and stopped inspections in 2015." In September 2023, about the possibility of joint military exercises between Russia and North Korea, he said: "Just as you can tell a person by their friends, you can tell a country by the company it keeps. In Russia's case, that company now consists largely of fellow rogue states."

=== Russian assassinations ===
In March 2018, about the early stages of investigation into the poisoning of Sergei and Yulia Skripal, Giles stated: "We can't make assumptions at this stage, but Russian involvement seems the most likely explanation. It fits the pattern of increasingly brazen attacks, trying to eliminate people who have either embarrassed the leadership or cost them money." About other Russian attempted and successful assassinations, he commented: "Let's not forget that these assassinations are well into double digits, and there are probably others we'll never find out about. What Russia has been learning through all of this is that there are no costs or consequences. Nobody cares enough to actually respond to Russia, so they continue." About the then foreign secretary Boris Johnson's comments and the possibility of Britain rethinking its involvement in the 2018 FIFA World Cup in Russia, he said: "My assumption is that it'll be fairly swiftly forgotten. Unless it's finally reached a point where it is sufficiently blatant that even the British government can't pretend it's not happening."

In August 2023, Giles urged caution about the death of Wagner Group leader Yevgeny Prigozhin in the 2023 Wagner Group plane crash. In September 2023, he further cautioned that while there may be discontent among the elites who are close to Putin and support him, Wagner and Prigozhin posed a specific threat that Putin would not allow to occur again. He said: "Unlike anybody in Putin's inner circle, Wagner was a disruptive element from outside the pyramid of power. Anybody else who is considering challenging Putin is unlikely to be in the same position because nobody else outside the inner power structures has access to the kind of resources that Prigozhin did." He added that many possible challengers to Putin have a vested interest in maintaining the status quo in order to preserve their fortunes and safety, saying: "Anybody that might have been considering standing against Moscow will have rapidly reassessed their risk calculus on seeing what happened to Prigozhin."

=== Yaroslav Hunka scandal ===
On 2 October 2023, Giles published an opinion piece on the Politico website titled "Fighting against the USSR didn’t necessarily make you a Nazi", in which he wrote that being a member of the Waffen-SS did not necessarily mean that somebody was guilty of war crimes. This was a response to the scandal surrounding the House of Commons of Canada's standing ovation for Yaroslav Hunka, a Ukrainian-Canadian World War II veteran of the 14th Waffen Grenadier Division of the SS (1st Galician). Giles cited investigations that had concluded that no war crimes or atrocities had been committed by Hunka's unit. Giles wrote that Hunka should not have been invited to the Canadian Parliament, not because he himself might be guilty of a war crime, but because the resulting scandal fuelled Russian propaganda.

Criticising Giles' opinion piece, Caspar Shaller, the media editor of Die Tageszeitung, commented that such an analysis – based on what he called "the enemy of my enemy is my friend" doctrine – when applied to ex-Waffen-SS members, trivialised Nazi atrocities, and itself only served to further Russian propaganda aims. Shaller criticised Giles for pointing out that Hunka and his unit had never been charged with war crimes, and claimed instead that the Nuremberg trials had ruled that all volunteer members of the Waffen-SS were guilty of war crimes (without noting that Hunka was conscripted into the Waffen-SS and was not a volunteer). He rebuked the German publishing house Axel Springer SE, which fully owns Politico, for publishing the opinion piece.

== Works ==
- NATO's Handbook of Russian Information Warfare (NATO Defense College, 2016)
- Moscow Rules: What Drives Russia to Confront the West (Brookings/Chatham House, 2019)
- What Deters Russia: Enduring Principles for Responding to Moscow (Chatham House, 2021)
- Russia's War on Everybody: And What it Means for You (Bloomsbury, 2022)
- How Russia Uses Nuclear Threats to Shape Western Responses to Aggression (Chatham House, 2023)
- Who Will Defend Europe? An Awakened Russia and a Sleeping Continent (Hurst, 2024)
- American Overthrow: Moscow’s Endgame in Its Long War with Washington (Hurst, 2026)
