= A Captive in the Land =

- Laserdisc cover
- Directed by: John Berry
- Screenplay by: John Berry; Lee Gold
- Based on: A Captive in the Land by James Aldridge
- Produced by: John Berry; Malcolm Stuart
- Starring: Sam Waterston; Aleksandr Potapov; Keir Giles
- Cinematography: Pierre-William Glenn; Oleg Sologub
- Edited by: Hubert C. de la Bouillerie; Georges Klotz; Rached M'Dini
- Music by: Bill Conti
- Production companies: Ask Soviet-American Films; Gorky Film Studio
- Distributed by: Gloria Film
- Release date: 1990
- Running time: 96 minutes
- Countries: Soviet Union; United States
- Language: English

A Captive in the Land (Russian: Пленник земли, romanized: Plennik zemli) is a 1990 Soviet–American survival drama film directed by John Berry and written by Berry and Lee Gold. (Note: A Captive in the Land was Lee Gold's last film.) The film is based on the 1962 novel of the same name by James Aldridge and stars Sam Waterston, Aleksandr Potapov and Keir Giles.

== Plot ==
On an Arctic flight, the crew of a RAF transport aircraft overflies a crashed aircraft. Although a survivor is spotted, the crew realizes that a rescue is not possible and rules out a landing. Rupert Royce (Sam Waterston), a U.S. meteorologist aboard the flight, volunteers to parachute to the ice with first aid supplies to treat the survivor.

Bringing supplies with him, Royce lands near the wreckage and finds Averyanov (Aleksandr Potapov), a Soviet navigator, the sole survivor who is injured and unable to be moved. Intending to wait until further help arrives, Royce makes repairs on the shattered aircraft, but soon realizes help is not coming, as the aircraft is far off course. The ice shifts below the wreckage, further complicating their survival.

When a blizzard strands the two men and forces them to survive on their own, they have to accept that different cultural backgrounds cannot jeopardize their survival. As supplies run low and a leaking heater nearly kills them, releasing deadly carbon monoxide into their small enclosure, Royce begins to make plans for both of them to find a way to reach civilization, the nearest settlement, 200 miles away. The isolation, ever-present wolves and dwindling supplies leaves Royce little option.

Setting out into the wilderness with an improvised sled to carry the injured airman, Averyanov urges Royce to save himself, and not to risk his own life in a vain attempt to save someone who will likely die soon anyway. Royce refuses and strives mightily to save the two "captives" of the wild.

== Cast ==
- Sam Waterston as Rupert Royce
- Aleksandr Potapov as Averyanov
- Keir Giles as Squadron Leader Cook
- Tony Hall as RAF Plane Crew member
- Victor Ignatyev as Chukchee
- Aleksei Ivashchenko as RAF Plane Crew member
- Albert Kondratyev as Chukchee
- Sofron Yefimov as Chukchee
- A. Lielise as RAF Plane Crew member
- Lyutsiya Dzhangaliyeva as Chukchee
- V. Muratov as RAF Plane Loadmaster
- L. Tregub as RAF Plane Crew member

== Production ==
A Captive in the Land was filmed in an island in the Onega Bay of the White Sea: Kiy Island and the Lena Rover, involved two sessions of location shooting. Sam Waterston had to return to Russia to complete the film after Aleksandr Potapov suffered a heart attack, causing a suspension of filming.

== Reception ==
A Captive in the Land was screened in the Un Certain Regard section at the 1991 Cannes Film Festival. Stephen Holden in his review for The New York Times, noted: "Had it stuck to the stark physical realities of the situation, "A Captive in the Land," which opens today at the Angelika Film Center, could have been a gripping film. But the movie, which was completed before the crumbling of the Soviet Union, insists on lending the relationship between the American and the Russian a turgid metaphoric significance."

A later review in TV Guide has similar assessments: "The plot and theme of A CAPTIVE IN THE LAND dates back, of course, to Jack London, long a favorite author among Russians, and the entire film project is colored by the reconciliation of American and Russian. Whether as a joint production with Maxim Gorky Film Studios or as an expression of rival ideologies (in a brief argument between the characters that seem outdated and silly) 'A Captive in the Land' is oddly unexciting. Potapov's chatty and literate Russian does not mesh at all well with Waterston's laconic would-be hero, and the location scenes look like stock footage."
