= Mena Calthorpe =

Australian writer

- Born: 1905; Goulburn, New South Wales
- Died: 1996 (aged 90–91); Sutherland, New South Wales
- Occupations: Novelist, schoolteacher and political activist
- Writing career
- Notable awards: Shortlisted for the Miles Franklin Literary Award; 1961 The dye house (novel)

Mena Ivy Bright Calthorpe (1905–1996) was an Australian writer, who was once short listed for the Miles Franklin Award.

== Personal life ==
Calthorpe (née Field) was born in Goulburn, New South Wales and was a keen writer from an early age. Educated at St Bridgets and Our Lady of Mercy College at Goulburn, she became a schoolteacher and worked at several small country schools for nearly ten years.

She was always keen on writing and credits encouragement for her early work to an older friend, Timpy Hebblewhite, the wife of the former editor of the Goulburn Evening Penny Post, TJ Hebblewhite.

Her short stories were occasionally accepted for publication on the back page of the Daily Mirror (in the 'Ten Minute Stories' section).

She was 28 when she married Bill Calthorpe, two years her junior, who worked on his family's sheep property, Douro Station outside Yass. The Calthorpe family were forced to sell the property in 1933 not long after Mena and Bill were married and they moved to Sydney, where they bought a shop in Paddington, which was not successful.

Calthorpe took up work in various office roles and continued to write in her spare time. She joined the School of Modern Writers, a group which included Katharine Susannah Prichard, Sally Bannister and Dorothy Corke. She also attended meetings of the Fellowship of Australian Writers and befriended Dymphna and Mary Cusack and Florence James.

Calthorpe had three novels published. Her first novel, The Dye House (1961), was short listed for the Miles Franklin Award and republished in 1982. Its subject was the harsh working conditions of her contemporaries and it has since been translated into German.

Calthorpe's second novel, The Defectors (1969), is about a power struggle in Australian trade unions.

Calthorpe received a grant from the Literature Board, Australia Council to assist with her third novel, The Plain of Ala (1989), which tells the story of four generations of an Irish family migrating to Australia.

Calthorpe was involved in various literary societies and taught creative writing. She and her husband Bill built a house in Caringbah and she later moved to Jannali where she lived until her death in 1996.

She told Giulia Giuffre. that she and Bill lost their only child during a caesarean birth. Though initially very upset she later became involved in the Playground movement and children's holiday camps through the Communist party. She said, of being childless: "It’s not a great sadness in my life."

Although some of her short stories were published in newspapers and literary journals, most remain unpublished and the original works and her various interviews and biographical cuttings are stored in the local history collection of the Sutherland Library, the State Library of New South Wales and at the National Library of Australia.

== Political involvement ==
Calthorpe says she had a politically conscious upbringing thanks to her father's influence and she joined the Communist Party when she came to Sydney in 1933.

Despite his family's conservative political stance, her husband Bill's experiences during the Depression led to him becoming active in the Trade Union movement.

Meanwhile, Mena Calthorpe found that she struggled to afford the cost of being an organiser in the Communist party – with fares, telephone calls and postage stamps adding up, and so she left the Party after four years.

She says that she joined the Labor party because she wanted to engage in the struggle between the Party's left wing and the Catholic Social Studies Movement known as the Groupers founded by B. A. Santamaria. The Groupers recruited Catholic activists to oppose Communism in the trade unions. Calthorpe says that she worked to defeat the Groupers' control over the Caringbah Branch of the Labor Party, then the largest ALP branch in New South Wales.

Calthorpe was active in the proletarian women writer's movement of the 1950s and 1960s, with contemporaries Katharine Susannah Prichard, Sally Bannister, and Dorothy Hewett, and continued an active member of the Australian Labor Party throughout her life.

== Works ==
- The Dyehouse (1961) Sydney : Ure Smith
- The Defectors (1969) Sydney : Australasian Book Society
- The Plain of Ala (1989) Sydney : Hale & Iremonger
