= Rupert Atkinson (poet) =

Australian poet and playwright

- Born: 2 February 1881; Sandhurst, Victoria, Australia
- Died: 6 February 1961 (aged 80); East Melbourne, Victoria, Australia

Evelyn John Rupert Atkinson (2 February 1881 – 6 February 1961) was an Australian poet and playwright.

== Biography ==
Evelyn John Rupert Atkinson was born in Bendigo (formerly known as Sandhurst), Victoria, and died in East Melbourne, Victoria, just after his eightieth birthday. Atkinson began his education at St Andrew's College, Bendigo, and travelled to Britain to complete it at Rugby School and Dover College. He matriculated and studied medicine at the University of Melbourne but did not complete the course. He helped to manage pastoral stations owned by his father, Harry Leigh Atkinson, a medical practitioner. After his father's death Atkinson inherited substantial property in the Bendigo area and soon devoted himself to a life of literature. He resided in England from 1922 to 1931. He also visited the Continent and the United States before returning to Australia, where he lived in Melbourne.

== Bibliography ==
=== Verse ===
- The Shrine of Desire: Poems (1906)
- By a Midnight Sea: Poems (1908)
- A Modern Magdelene (1913) (aka The Renegades: A Tale in Verse)
- Wayside Poems (1913)
- A Flagon of Song (1919)
- We Gods in Masquerade (1964)

=== Drama ===
- A Nocturne (1919)
- Each Man a Multitude: a fantastic tragedy in three acts (1923)
- Ten Years' Remorse: a play in one act (1923)
- A Prologue to a Tragedy (1924)
- Boronia for the Soul (1925)
- Prologue to a Tragedy (1928) (aka A Prologue and Three Plays)
