= Signed with Their Honour =

Novel by James Aldridge

First US edition (publ. Book League Of America)

Signed with Their Honour is a 1942 novel by Australian author James Aldridge. It was set during World War II in Greece. The novel is a fictional depiction of the activities of 80 Squadron during the British intervention in Greece. It is dedicated to the Commonwealth Ace of Aces, Pat Pattle, and Squadron Leader Hickey. The title is derived from a 1933 poem by Stephen Spender titled "The Truly Great."

It was much acclaimed in the US on publication.

== Film Version ==
Producer Paul Sofkin bought film rights in 1943. Rank Studios commenced work on the film in 1944 with Vernon Sewell as director and Osmond Borradaile as cinematographer. Filming of the aerial sequences took place in Shrewsbury and at Denham studios, using Gloster Gladiator biplanes (which were featured in the novel). However the production was then cancelled due to budgetary restrictions and the loss of three aircraft in accidental crashes during filming. In 1946 Ealing announced they were considering making the movie but this did not happen.
