= Mary Montgomerie Bennett =

Australian activist and teacher (1881–1961)

- Born: 8 July 1881; London, United Kingdom
- Died: 6 October 1961 (aged 80); Kalgoorlie, Western Australia
- Occupations: Activist, educator
- Spouse: Charles Douglas Bennett

Mary Montgomerie Bennett (1881–1961) was an Australian activist and teacher. She is notable as a historical advocate for the rights of Aboriginal Australians, particularly in Western Australia, at a time when this was not a common feature of Australian public life.

Ms Bennett was a particularly strong critic of her historical contemporary A. O. Neville.

== Biography ==
Bennett's childhood was spent in both England and Australia, where her father Robert Christison had a station in north Queensland. By 1910, the family had sold up and relocated permanently to England. Bennett married Charles Douglas Bennett in 1914.

In 1927, she published Christison of Lammermoor, a biography of her father which was comparatively unusual at the time for its acknowledgement of settler violence towards Aborigines. Whilst in London she also published The Australian Aboriginal as a Human Being (1930). In 1930, after her husband had died, Bennett relocated to Perth, Western Australia to devote the rest of her life to Aboriginal welfare.

In 1932, Bennett settled at the Mount Margaret Mission near Laverton. Whilst working as a teacher of Aboriginal children, she was also actively involved in activist groups, including the Women's Service Guild.

Her work led to the formation of the Moseley Royal Commission in 1934. During her testimony before the Commission, Bennett condemned the alleged widespread sexual exploitation of Aboriginal women, as well as the forced removal of their children by the authorities.

In 1960, the year before her death, Bennett wrote to the Kalgoorlie Miner and asked its readers:

Who made the Eastern Goldfields natives beggars? Surely it must have been we whites who robbed them of their land without giving them compensation, who robbed them of their children without giving them training for earning a living, and who have frustrated their every incentive to live.

Bennett died in Kalgoorlie on 6 October 1961 and was buried with Churches of Christ rites in the Kalgoorlie cemetery. After her death, Bennett's personal archive, "a dossier of state malpractice and neglect on a significant scale", was stolen and has not been recovered. Her life's work was recognised when she was one of the inaugural inductees to the Victorian Honour Roll of Women in 2001.

== Works ==
- Bennett, M. M. (Mary Montgomerie) (1927), Christison of Lammermoor, Alston Rivers
- Bennett, M. M. (Mary Montgomerie) (1930), The Australian Aboriginal as a human being, Alston Rivers
- Bennett, M. M. (Mary Montgomerie) (1935), Teaching the Aborigines : data from Mount Margaret Mission, W.A, s.n
- Bennett, M. M. (Mary Montgomerie) (1950), Human rights for Australian Aborigines : how can they learn without a teacher, [s.n.]
