= Thomas Shapcott =

Australian writer (born 1935)

Thomas Shapcott AO
- Born: Thomas William Shapcott; 21 March 1935 (age 91); Ipswich, Queensland, Australia
- Occupations: Poet, novelist, playwright, editor, librettist, short story writer and teacher
- Spouse(s): Margaret Hodge (1960-?); Judith Rodriguez (1982–2018)
- Writing career
- Notable awards: 2000: Patrick White Award

Thomas William Shapcott AO (born 21 March 1935) is an Australian poet, novelist, playwright, editor, librettist, short story writer and teacher.

== Biography ==
Thomas William Shapcott was born in Ipswich, Queensland, and attended the Ipswich Grammar School with his twin brother, who was born on the previous day (20 March 1935). (The writer is left-handed, but his twin is right-handed.) He left school at 15 to work in his father's accountancy business, but completed an accountancy degree in 1961. In 1967 he graduated in arts from the University of Queensland.

His first artistic impulse was to be a composer. By age 19, he had written a number of works, but he turned away from music when he discovered a string quartet he had written unconsciously plagiarised a chamber work by Ernest Bloch. He then worked as a tax accountant, a profession that he pursued for 27 years.

He was director of the Australia Council's Literature Board for seven years, and executive director of the National Book Council (1992–97). He was professor of creative writing at the University of Adelaide.

He has written 15 collections of poetry and 6 novels.

Thomas Shapcott was appointed an Officer (AO) of the Order of Australia in 1989.

== Selected list of works ==
=== Poetry collections ===
- Time on Fire (1961)
- The Mankind Thing (1964)
- Sonnets 1960-1963 (1964)
- A Taste of Salt Water: Poems (1967)
- Inwards to the Sun: Poems (1969)
- Fingers at Air: Experimental Poems 1969 (1969)
- Interim Report: some poems 1970/71 (1971)
- Begin with Walking (1972)
- Two Voices: Poems (1973) with Margaret Shapcott
- Shabbytown Calendar (1975)
- Seventh Avenue Poems (1976)
- Selected Poems (1978)
- Turning Full Circle (1979)
- Stump and Grape and Bopple-Nut (1981)
- Welcome! (1983)
- Travel Dice (1987)
- Selected Poems 1956-1988 (1989)
- In the Beginning (1990)
- The City of Home (1995)
- The Sun's Waste is Our Energy (1998)
- Cities in Exile (1998)
- Chekhov's Mongoose (2000)
- Music Circus and Other Poems (2004)
- Adelaide Lunch Sonnets (2006)
- The City of Empty Rooms (2006)
- The Book of Hanging Gardens (2009)
- Part of Us (2010)
- At Marcoola (2011)

=== Novels ===
- The Birthday Gift (1982)
- White Stag of Exile (1984)
- Hotel Bellevue (1986)
- The Search for Galina (1989)
- Mona's Gift (1993)
- Theatre of Darkness (1998)
- Spirit Wrestlers (2004)

=== Short story collections ===
- Limestone and Lemon Wine: Stories (1988)
- What You Own: Stories (1991)
- Gatherers and Hunters: Stories (2011)

=== Young adult ===
- Holiday of the Ikon (1984)
- Flood Children (1981)

=== Non-fiction ===
- Writers Interviews with the Camera (1989)
- Biting the Bullet: A Literary memoir (1990)
- Twins in the Family: Interviews with Australian Twins (2001)

== Awards ==
- Grace Leven Prize for Poetry, 1961: winner for "Time on Fire".
- Myer Award for Australian Poetry, 1967: winner for A taste of salt water
- C.J. Dennis Memorial Poetry Competition, Open Section, 1976: commended for The five senses
- Canada-Australia Literary Award, 1978
- Officer of the Order of Australia, 1989, for his services to Literature
- Golden Wreath of the Struga Poetry Evenings laureate, 1990
- Wesley Michel Wright Prize for Poetry, 1996
- New South Wales Premier's Literary Awards, Special Discretionary Award, 1996
- Patrick White Award, 2000
- Harold White Fellowships, 2005. Note: to examine the papers of Ray Mathew
- Honorary Doctorate of Literature from Macquarie University

== See also ==
First Seed Ripening an album by Elixir and Katie Noonan. The tracks on this album are inspired by Shapcott's writing.
