= 1965 in poetry =

Nationality words link to articles with information on the nation's poetry or literature (for instance, Irish or France).

== Events ==
- June 11 – International Poetry Incarnation, a performance poetry event, is staged at the Royal Albert Hall in London before an audience of 7,000, with members of the Beat Generation featuring; Adrian Mitchell reads "To Whom It May Concern"
- Meic Stephens founds Poetry Wales
- Russian poet Anna Akhmatova is allowed to travel outside the Soviet Union to Sicily and England in order to receive the Taormina prize and an honorary doctoral degree from the University of Oxford
- The Belfast Festival at Queen's publishes pamphlets this year and next by some of the members of The Belfast Group of poets, including Seamus Heaney and Michael Longley, which attracts some notice
- In Spain, two new periodical reviews are founded:
  - Poesía para todos, started by younger Spanish poets and illustrated by renowned painters
  - Los sesenta, launched by Max Aub and with editors including the poets Jorge Guillén and Rafael Alberti. The second number is published in homage to the Unamuno
- In the British Isles, the centenary of the birth of W. B. Yeats brings forth a number of critical works, prominent among them Thomas Parkinson's book W. B. Yeats: The Later Poetry, and Conor Cruise O'Brien's long essay addressing Yeats' relationship to Fascism, published in In Excited Reverie, edited by A. N. Jeffares and K. G. Cross
- African-American poet Dudley Randall founds Broadside Press in Detroit, which publishes many leading African-American writers
- Paul Éluard's 1926 book of poems, Capitale de la douleur ("Capital of Pain"), influences Jean-Luc Godard's French film Alphaville (released May 5) which has quotations from the book
- The periodical Modern Poetry in Translation is launched by Ted Hughes, Daniel Weissbort and George Theiner in Britain

== Works published in English ==
Listed by nation where the work was first published (and again by the poet's native land, if different); substantially revised works listed separately:

=== Australia ===
- Vincent Buckley, "Stroke"
- Geoffrey Lehmann and Les Murray, The Ilex Tree
- Les Murray
  - "Driving Through Sawmill Towns"
  - "Noonday Axeman"
- John Thompson, editor, Australian Poetry, Sydney: Angus & Robertson, 76 pp
- Judith Wright, Preoccupations in Australian Poetry (scholarship), Australia

=== Canada ===
- John Glassco, editor, English Poetry in Quebec
- Daryl Hine, The Wooden Horse
- Lionel Kearns, Listen George
- C. F. Klinck and W. H. New, editors, Literary History of Canada, first of four volumes (fourth volume published in 1990, scholarship, Canada
- Irving Layton, Collected Poems
- Tom Marshall, The Beast with Three Backs, Quarry Press
- John Newlove, Moving in Alone, Contact Press
- Al Purdy, The Cariboo Horses, Canada
- Raymond Souster, Ten Elephants on Yonge Street
- Wilfred Watson, Naked Poems
- Phyllis Webb, Naked Poems

=== India in English ===
- Dom Moraes John Nobody ( Poetry in English )
- Nissim Ezekiel:
  - The Exact Name: Poems 1960–1964 ( Poetry in English ), Calcutta: Writers Workshop, India
  - The Unfinished Man, poems written in 1959; ( Poetry in English ), Calcutta: Writers Workshop, India
- P. Lal, "Charge!" They Said ( Poetry in English ), Calcutta: Writers Workshop, India .
- Kamala Das, Summer of Calcutta: Fifty Poems ( Poetry in English ), Delhi: Rajinder Paul
- Roshen Alkazi, Seventeen Poems (see also Seventeen More Poems 1970); Calcutta: Writers Workshop, India
- Deb Kumar Das, Through A Glass Darkly: Poems ( Poetry in English ), Calcutta: Writers Workshop, India
- T. V. Datareyan, Silver Box and Other Poems ( Poetry in English ), Bombay: Strand
- Vinayaka Krishna Gokak, In Life's Temple ( Poetry in English ), Madras: Blackie and Son
- S. R. Mokashi-Punekar, The Captive ( Poetry in English ), preface by Herbert Read

=== Ireland ===
- Denis Devlin, Collected Poems, Dublin: Dolmen Press
- Seamus Heaney, Northern Ireland native Irish poet with books published originally in the United Kingdom:
  - Death of a Naturalist
  - Eleven Poems, Queen's University
- Richard Murphy, Sailing to an Island, London: Faber and Faber; New York: Chilmark Press, Irish poet with books published originally in the United Kingdom

=== New Zealand ===
- Charles Brasch: (year uncertain, but thought to be this year) Twice Sixty, Wellington: Printed at the Wai-te-ata Press (Single poem; broadsheet)
- Charles Doyle, editor, Recent Poetry in New Zealand, anthology
- Kendrick Smithyman, A Way of Saying: A Study of New Zealand Poetry, Auckland & London: Collins, criticism

=== South Africa ===
- Patrick Cullinan, North
- Ruth Miller (South African poet), Floating Island, Cape Town
- David Wright, Adam at Evening, London: Hodder and Stoughton, including "By the Effigy of St. Cecilia"; South African poet with works published originally in the United Kingdom

=== United Kingdom ===
- Alan Bold, Society Inebrious
- George Mackay Brown, The Year of the Whale, Scottish poet
- Basil Bunting:
  - Loquitur (Fulcrum Press)
  - The Spoils (Morden Tower Bookroom)
- Christopher Caudwell, Poems
- Tony Connor, Lodgers London: Oxford University Press London: Chatto and Windus with Hogarth Press
- Donald Davie, The Poems of Doctor Zhivago
- C. Day-Lewis, The Room and Other Poems
- Paul Dehn, The Fern on the Rock: Collected Poems, 1935–1965
- D. J. Enright, The Old Adam, London: Chatto and Windus with Hogarth Press
- Harry Fainlight, Sussicran, London: Turret Books
- Roy Fuller, Buff
- David Gascoyne, Collected Poems
- Robert Graves, Collected Poems (1965 version)
- Michael Hamburger, In Flashlight
- Seamus Heaney, Northern Ireland native published in the United Kingdom:
  - Death of a Naturalist
  - Eleven Poems, Queen's University
- John Heath-Stubbs, Selected Poems
- George MacBeth, A Doomsday Book, a mix of poems and poem-games, Lowestoft, Suffolk: Scorpion Press
- Norman MacCaig, Measures, London: Chatto and Windus with Hogarth Press
- Richard Murphy, Sailing to an Island, London: Faber and Faber; New York: Chilmark Press, Irish poet
- Sylvia Plath, Ariel, London: Faber and Faber (New York: Harper & Row, 1966), American poet in the United Kingdom
- Kathleen Raine, The Hollow Hill, and Other Poems 1960–4
- Alan Ross, North from Sicily
- Vernon Scannell, Walking Wounded
- Jon Silkin, Nature with Man
- C. H. Sisson, Numbers
- Sir Osbert Sitwell, Poems about People or England Reclaimed (collected from three previous volumes)
- Iain Crichton Smith, The Law and the Grace
- Bernard Spencer, Collected Poems
- Stephen Spender, Selected Poems
- John Wain, Wildtrack, Wildtrack, London: Macmillan
- Ted Walker, Fox on a Barn Door
- Hugo Williams, Symptoms of Loss: Poems, Oxford University Press
- David Wright, Adam at Evening, London: Hodder and Stoughton, including "By the Effigy of St. Cecilia"; South African poet with works published originally in the United Kingdom

==== Anthologies ====
- P. L. Brent, editor, Young Commonwealth Poets 1965
- Matthew Hodgart, The Faber Book of Ballads
- I. M. Parsons, Men Who March Away (poems of World War I)
- Robin Skelton, Poetry of the Thirties
- James Reeves, The Cassell Book of English Poetry
- C. V. Wedgwood, editor, New Poems 1965: A PEN Anthology, London: Hutchinson

==== Criticism and scholarship in the United Kingdom ====
- Bernard Bergozi, Heroes' Twilight on the literature of World War I
- Anthony Burgess, Here Comes Everybody on the work of James Joyce
- Donald Davie, Ezra Pound: Poet as Sculptor
- Patricia Hutchins, Ezra Pound's Kensington: An Exploration 1885–1913
- Conor Cruise O'Brien, a long essay which addressed W. B. Yeats' relationship to Fascism, published in In Excited Reverie, edited by A. N. Jeffares and K. G. Cross.
- Harold Owen, Journey from Obscurity, Volume III, autobiography by the brother of poet Wilfred Owen, giving "a few interesting glimpses of the poet", according to William Leslie Webb, literary editor of The Guardian
- Thomas Parkinson, W.B. Yeats: The Later Poetry

=== United States ===
- A.R. Ammons:
  - Corsons Inlet
  - Tape for the Turn of the Year
- George Barker, Collected Poems, New York: October House
- Ted Berrigan, Living With Chris
- Elizabeth Bishop, Questions of Travel (Farrar, Straus, and Giroux)
- Hayden Carruth, Nothing for Tigers
- Edgar Bowers, The Astronomers
- Louis Coxe, The Last Hero
- E.E. Cummings, Fairy Tales (posthumous)
- Ed Dorn:
  - Idaho Out, Fulcrum Press
  - Geography, Fulcrum Press
- Robert Duncan, Roots and Branches
- Paul Engle, A Woman Unashamed
- Jean Garrigue, Country Without Maps, including "Pays Perdu"
- Allen Ginsberg, Jukebox All'Idrogeno, Milan: Arnoldo Mondadori Editore
- Donald Hall, A Roof of Tiger Lilies
- John Hollander, Visions from the Ramble
- E. Y. Harburg, Irreverent Rhymes
- Lee Harwood, title illegible (sic) published by Bob Cobbing's Writers Forum
- Paul Horgan, Songs After Lincoln
- David Ignatow, Figures of the Human
- Randall Jarrell:
  - Little Friend, Little Friend
  - The Lost World, a book of 22 poems, reviewers gave it a mixed reception, New York: Macmillan
- John Knoepfle, Rivers into Islands
- Philip Larkin, The Whitsun Weddings
- Stanley McNail, Something Breathing
- Gabriela Mistral, Selected Poems translated from Spanish
- Samuel French Morse, The Changes
- Howard Moss, Finding Them Lost, New York: Scribners
- Edwin Muir, Collected Poems, New York: Oxford University Press
- Mary Oliver, No Voyage, and Other Poems (expanded from first edition in 1963)
- George Oppen, This in Which
- Sylvia Plath, Ariel, including "Daddy", (posthumous)
- David Ray, X-Rays
- Charles Reznikoff, the first of his Testimony collections
- David Shapiro, January
- Jon Silkin, Nature with Man
- Clark Ashton Smith, Poems in Prose
- Hollis Summers, Seven Occasions
- Melvin Tolson, Harlem Gallery
- Mona Van Duyn, A Time of Bees
- Theodore Weiss, The Medium: New Poems, New York: Macmillan
- Samuel Yellen, New and Selected Poems
- Marya Zaturenska, Collected Poems
- Louis Zukofsky, ALL: The Collected Short Poems, 1923–1958 (Norton)

==== Criticism and scholarship in the United States ====
- Theodore Roethke, On the Poet and his Craft (published posthumously)
- Chard Powers Smith, Where the Light Falls, about Edward Arlington Robinson

=== Other in English ===
- P. L. Brent, editor, Young Commonwealth Poets 1965 (anthology published in the United Kingdom)
- A. L. Hendriks, On This Mountain (Caribbean)
- Frank Kobina Parkes, Songs from the Wilderness (Ghanaian living in the United Kingdom)
- Derek Walcott, The Castaway (Caribbean)

== Works published in other languages ==
Listed by language and often by nation where the work was first published and again by the poet's native land, if different; substantially revised works listed separately:

=== Denmark ===
- Jørgen Gustava Brandt, Etablissementet
- Klaus Rifbjerg, Amagerdigle ("Amager Poems")
- Ivan Malinovski, Poetomatic

==== Anthologies ====
- Poul Borum, editor, a volume of modern poetry
- Torben Brostrøm, Den nye poesi, a volume of modern poetry (a new version, first published in 1962)
- Jess Ørnsbo, editor, a volume of modern poetry

=== Finland ===
- Pertti Nieminen, Silmissä maailman maisemat ("The World in his Eyes"), colorful, humorous fables in the form of poetry
- Arvo Turtainen, translation of Leaves of Grass
- Pentti Saarikoski, Kuljen missä kuljen ("Traveling Man")

=== French language ===
==== Canada ====
- Jacques Brault, Mémoire
- Paul Chamberland, L'Afficheur hurle
- Gilbert Choquette, L'Honneur de vivre
- Cécile Cloutier, Cuivre et soìes
- Paul-Marie Lapointe, Pour les âmes
- Fernand Oulette, Le Soleil sous la mort

==== France ====
- Yves Bonnefoy, Pierre écrite
- Andrée Chedid, Double-Pays
- Roger Giroux, L'Arbre le temps, which won the Max Jacob Prize
- Edmond Jabès, Le Retour au Livre
- Pierre Jean Jouve:
  - The "definitive edition" of his poetry
  - Ténèbre
- R. Lorno, Légendaire, a book of verses in a style vaguely like Verlaine; the book won the Apollinaire Prize.
- Loys Masson, La Dame de Pavoux
- Saint-John Perse, Pour Dante, Paris: Gallimard
- Marcelin Pleynet, Comme
- Francis Ponge:
  - Pour un Malherbe
  - Tome Premier
- Robert Sabatier, Les Poisons délectables
- Jean Tortel, Les Villes découvertes

===== Criticism =====
- J. P. Richard, Onze Etudes sur la poésie moderne

==== Switzerland ====
- Maurice Chappaz, Chant de la Grande Dixence

=== Hebrew ===
- N. Alterman, Hagigat Kayitz ("Summer Celebration")
- Yonathan Ratosh, Shirai Memesh ("Poems of Tangibility")
- Mattityahu Shoham, Ketavim ("Writings")
- Moshe Dor, Sirpad Umatehet ("Briar and Metal")
- I. Pincas, Aruhat Erev be-Ferrara ("Supper in Ferrara")
- A. Broides, le-Eretz ha-Moked ("Toward the Blazing Land")

==== United States ====
- Moses Feinstein, a book of poems and sonnets
- G. Preil, Mivhar Shirim ("A Selection of Poems"), introduction by A. Shabatay
- Yaffa Eliach, Eishet ha-Dayag ("Fisherman's Wife"), a long, narrative poem
- A. Zeitlin, Hazon ve-Hazon Medinah ("A State and a State Envisioned")

=== India ===
Listed in alphabetical order by first name:

- Chandiroor Divakaran, Radha, Malayalam-language
- Nilmani Phookan, Nirjanatar Sabda, Guwahati, Assam: Dutta Barua; Assamese-language
- Nirendranath Chakravarti, Nirokto Korobi, Kolkata: Surabhi Prokashoni; Bengali-language
- Kunwar Narain, Atmajayee, a short epic poem, New Delhi: Bharatiya Jnanpith; Hindi-language
- Umashankar Joshi, Mahaprasthan, a "dialogue-poem"; Gujarati-language

=== Italy ===
- Alfredo Giuliani:
  - Povera Juliet, a complete collection of his poetry
  - editor, Novissimi, a new and enlarged edition of the 1961 anthology-cum-manifesto "increasingly regarded as the principal event in Italian poetry in recent times"
- Roberto Roversi, Dopo Campoformio, collection
- Carlo Villa, Siamo esseri antichi
- Vittorio Sereni, Gli strumenti umani
- Giovanni Giudici, La vita in versi

=== Portuguese ===
==== Brazil ====
- Carlos Drummond de Andrade, complete works
- Cassiano Ricardo, Jeremias sem chorar
- Mauro Mota, Canto au meio

===== Criticism =====
- Cassiano Ricardo, Algumas reflexões sôbre poética de vanguarda

=== Spanish ===
==== Spain ====
- Ramón Garciasol, Fuente serena
- Diego Jesús Jiménez, La ciudad, winner of the Premio Adonais prize
- José Hierro, El libro de las alucinaciones
- Justo Jorge Padrón, Trazos de un paréntesis

==== Latin America ====
- Alaíde Foppa, Guirnalda de primavera ("Spring wreath") (Guatemalan poet published in Mexico)
- Victor García Robles, Oíd Mortales (Argentina), winner of the Cuban Casa de las Américas Prize in poetry
- J. Bañuelos, O. Oliva, J. A. Shelley, E. Zepeda, and J. Labastida (all in Mexico), Ocupación de la palabra, a collection of their poems
- Carlos Medellín, El aire y las colinas (Colombia)

===== Criticism =====
- José Emilio Pacheco, Poesía mexicana del siglo XIX, which Jose Francisco Vazquez-Amaral called (in 1966) "the first reliable work of its kind to deal with that important period of Mexican poetry".

=== Yiddish ===
- editor(s) not known, Horizons, a poetry anthology published in the Soviet Union
- Kadia Molodowsky, Light from the Thorn Tree
- Berish Vaynshteyn, Destined Poems
- Robert Frost, a volume of his poems in Yiddish (published in Israel), translated by Meyer-Ziml Tkatsh
- Leyb Olitski, a book of poems (published in Israel)
- Arye Shamri, a book of poems (published in Israel)
- Moshe Yungman, a book of poems (published in Israel)
- Leyzer Aykhenrand, a book of poems (published in Israel)
- Malka Heifetz Tussman, a book of poems (published in Israel)

=== Other ===
- Dritëro Agolli, Shtigje malesh dhe trotuare ("Mountain paths and sidewalks") (Albania)
- Stratis Haviaras, Βερολίνο ("Berlin", Greece)
- Majken Johansson, Liksom överlämnad (Sweden), her first volume in seven years
- Bengt Emil Johnson, Gubbdrunkning (Sweden)
- Sarah and Rainer Kirsch, Gespräch mit dem Saurier: Gedichte, East Germany
- Luo Fu, Death of a Stone Cell, China (Taiwan)
- Alexander Mezhirov, Ладожский лёд ("Ice of Lake Ladoga"), Russia, Soviet Union
- Boris Pasternak, collected poems published in the Soviet Union, not as complete as the collection published by the University of Michigan in 1961, but the closest to complete available to Soviet readers
- Einar Skjæraasen, "Sang i september" the first poem to appear since 1956 from one of Norway's most popular poets

== Awards and honors ==
=== Australia ===
- Grace Leven Prize for Poetry: Geoffrey Lehmann & Les Murray, The Ilex Tree

=== Canada ===
- See 1965 Governor General's Awards for a complete list of winners and finalists for those awards.

=== United Kingdom ===
- Eric Gregory Award: John Fuller, Derek Mahon, Michael Longley, Norman Talbot
- Queen's Gold Medal for Poetry: Philip Larkin

=== United States ===
- Bollingen Prize: Horace Gregory
- Consultant in Poetry to the Library of Congress (later the post would be called "Poet Laureate Consultant in Poetry to the Library of Congress"): Stephen Spender appointed this year.
- National Book Award for Poetry: Theodore Roethke, The Far Field
- Pulitzer Prize for Poetry: John Berryman: 77 Dream Songs
- Fellowship of the Academy of American Poets: Marianne Moore

=== Other ===
- Danish Academy 1965 literature prize: Erik Knudsen, poet and dramatist

== Births ==
- May 30 – Guadalupe Grande (died 2021), Spanish poet
- June 1 – Adeena Karasick, Canadian poet and performance artist
- September 6 – Christopher Nolan (died 2009), Irish poet and author
- November 1 – Kirsten Hammann, Denmark
- November 18 – Michael Crummey, Canadian novelist and poet
- November 23 – Marcel Beyer, German
- Also:
  - Patience Agbabi, Black English performance poet
  - Paul Farley, English poet
  - Timothy Liu, American poet
  - Jay Ruzesky, Canadian poet
  - R. M. Vaughan, Canadian poet and writer
  - Tony Walsh, English poet
  - Sonja Yelich, New Zealand poet

== Deaths ==
Birth years link to the corresponding "[year] in poetry" article:

- January 4 – T. S. Eliot, 76, American/British poet
- January 28 – Motokichi Takahashi 高橋元吉 (born 1893), Japanese, Taishō and Shōwa period poet
- February 2 – Richard Blackmur, 61, American literary critic and poet
- March 13 – Fan Noli, 83, Albanian writer, scholar, archbishop and politician (Prime Minister)
- March 17 – Nancy Cunard, 69, English writer, editor and publisher
- June 5 – Eleanor Farjeon, 84, English poet and author
- June 22 – Piaras Béaslaí, 84, Irish writer and poet
- July 10 – Jacques Audiberti 66, French playwright, poet and novelist and exponent of the Theatre of the Absurd
- August 17:
  - Jack Spicer (born 1925), American poet often identified with the San Francisco Renaissance
  - Jun Takami 高見順 pen-name of Takama Yoshioa (born 1907), Japanese, Shōwa period novelist and poet
- August 24 – Fuyue Anzai 安西 冬衛 (born 1898) Japanese poet and co-founder of the magazine Shi To Shiron ("Poetry and Poetics")
- October 15 or October 14 – Randall Jarrell, 51, American author, writer and poet, in a highway accident;
- June 22 – Joseph Auslander, 67, American poet, of a heart attack
- September 2 – Johannes Bobrowski (born 1917), East German lyric poet, fiction writer, adaptor and essayist
- November 28 – Aslaug Vaa (born 1889), Norway
- Also – Brian Higgins (born 1930), British poet, mathematician and rugby league player

== See also ==
- Poetry
- List of poetry awards
- List of years in poetry
