= Ilex (disambiguation) =

Ilex is the genus of flowering plants also known as holly.

Ilex or ILEX may also refer to:

== Enterprises and organizations ==
- ILEX Press Ltd., a division of Hachette publishing books on graphics
- Ilex Theatre Company at Hollyfield School, Surrey, England
- Ilex Urban Regeneration Company Ltd., an urban regeneration company set up by the Northern Ireland Executive
- International Legal Exchange Program (ILEX), a student exchange program for law students
- Institute of Legal Executives (ILEX), original name of Chartered Institute of Legal Executives, a professional (and examination) body in England and Wales
- Intelligent Labelling Explorer (ILEX), an artificial intelligence project at the University of Edinburgh, Scotland

== Other uses ==
- HMS Ilex, a British Royal Navy destroyer that served during the Second World War
- The Ilex Tree, a 1965 Australian poetry collection by Les Murray and Geoffrey Lehmann

== See also ==
- Illex, a squid genus
