= 1965 in Australian literature =

This article presents a list of the historical events and publications of Australian literature during 1965.

== Major publications ==
=== Books ===
- Thea Astley – The Slow Natives
- Clive Barry – Crumb Borne
- Nancy Cato – North West by South
- Don Charlwood – All the Green Year
- Catherine Gaskin – The File on Devlin
- Donald Horne – The Permit
- Thomas Keneally – The Fear
- Christopher Koch – Across the Sea Wall
- Eric Lambert – The Long White Night
- D'Arcy Niland – The Apprentices
- Randolph Stow – The Merry-Go-Round in the Sea
- George Turner – A Waste of Shame
- Morris West – The Ambassador

=== Short stories ===
- Mena Kasmiri Abdullah and Ray Mathew – The Time of the Peacock: Stories
- Damien Broderick – A Man Returned
- Peter Cowan – The Empty Street: Stories
- John K. Ewers – Modern Australian Short Stories (edited)
- Thelma Forshaw – "The Mateship Syndrome"
- Frank Hardy – The Yarns of Billy Borker
- Hal Porter – The Cats of Venice

=== Children's and Young Adult fiction ===
- Nan Chauncy
  - Panic at the Garage
  - The Skewbald Pony
- Ruth Park
  - The Muddle-Headed Wombat in the Treetops
  - Ring for the Sorcerer
- Joan Phipson – Birkin
- Ivan Southall – Ash Road
- Eleanor Spence – The Year of the Currawong
- Kylie Tennant – Trail Blazers of the Air
- Colin Thiele – February Dragon
- Patricia Wrightson – Down to Earth

=== Poetry ===
- Vincent Buckley – "Stroke"
- Bruce Dawe – A Need of Similar Name
- Rosemary Dobson – Cock Crow : Poems
- Robert D. Fitzgerald – Forty Years' Poems
- A. D. Hope – "Ode on the Death of Pius the Twelfth"
- Geoffrey Lehmann & Les Murray – The Ilex Tree
- Les Murray
  - "Driving Through Sawmill Towns"
  - "Noonday Axeman"
- Vivian Smith – "At an Exhibition of Historical Paintings, Hobart"

=== Biography ===
- Martin Boyd – Day of My Delight
- Norman Lindsay – Bohemians of the Bulletin

=== Drama ===
- John McKellar – A Cup of Tea, a Bex and a Good Lie Down

== Awards and honours ==
=== Literary ===
Award	Author	Title	Publisher
ALS Gold Medal	Patrick White	The Burnt Ones	Penguin Books Australia
Miles Franklin Award	Thea Astley	The Slow Natives	Angus and Robertson

=== Children and Young Adult ===
Award	Category	Author	Title	Publisher
Children's Book of the Year Award	Older Readers	H. F. Brinsmead	Pastures of the Blue Crane	Oxford University Press
Children's Book of the Year Award	Picture Book	Elisabeth MacIntyre	Hugh's Zoo	Constable Young Books

=== Poetry ===
Award	Author	Title	Publisher
Grace Leven Prize for Poetry	Geoffrey Lehmann & Les Murray	The Ilex Tree	Australian National University Press

== Births ==
A list, ordered by date of birth (and, if the date is either unspecified or repeated, ordered alphabetically by surname) of births in 1965 of Australian literary figures, authors of written works or literature-related individuals follows, including year of death.

- 25 March – Melina Marchetta, novelist
- 11 September — Cat Sparks, science fiction writer
- 29 December – Gideon Haigh, journalist and author

Unknown date

- Michael Farrell, poet
- Fiona Kelly McGregor, novelist
- Carrie Tiffany, novelist
- Christos Tsiolkas, novelist
- Charlotte Wood, novelist

== Deaths ==
A list, ordered by date of death (and, if the date is either unspecified or repeated, ordered alphabetically by surname) of deaths in 1965 of Australian literary figures, authors of written works or literature-related individuals follows, including year of birth.

- 28 January – Gertrude Hart, novelist (born 1873)
- 29 January – T. Harri Jones, Welsh poet who emigrated to Australia (born 1921)
- 17 May – Duke Tritton, poet and folksinger (born 1886)
- 28 May – P. R. Stephensen, writer, publisher and political activist (born 1901)
- 3 September – Brian Fitzpatrick, author, historian and journalist (born 1905)
- 2 November –
  - Lex Banning, poet (born 1921 with cerebral palsy and unable to speak clearly or to write with a pen)
  - H.V. Evatt, judge, parliamentarian and writer (born 1894)

== See also ==
- 1965 in Australia
- 1965 in literature
- 1965 in poetry
- List of years in Australian literature
- List of years in literature
