= 1921 in Australian literature =

This article presents a list of the historical events and publications of Australian literature during 1921.

== Books ==
- William Baylebridge — An Anzac Muster
- Jean Curlewis — The Ship That Never Set Sail
- Dulcie Deamer — Revelation
- Arthur Gask — The Secret of the Sandhills
- Fergus Hume — The Unexpected
- Jack McLaren — The Oil Seekers: The Tale of New Guinea Beach
- Ernest O'Ferrall — Bodger and the Boarders
- Katharine Susannah Prichard — Black Opal

== Poetry ==
- Zora Cross — "Elegy on an Australian Schoolboy"
- C. J. Dennis — A Book for Kids
- Mary E. Fullerton
  - "The Selector's Wife"
  - "War Time"
- Lesbia Harford
  - "Day's End"
  - "The Folk I Love"
  - "The Invisible People"
- Sumner Locke — In Memoriam: Sumner Locke
- Dorothea Mackellar — "Vestal"
- Furnley Maurice — "Plunder"
- John Shaw Neilson
  - "For a Little Girl's Birthday"
  - "The Orange Tree"
  - "To a School-Girl in Her Fourteenth Year"
- John O'Brien
  - Around the Boree Log and Other Verses
  - "Tangmalangaloo"
  - "The Trimmin's on the Rosary"
- Vance Palmer — "The Snake"

== Children's and Young Adult fiction ==
- Mary Grant Bruce — Back to Billabong
- May Gibbs — Little Obelia, and Further Adventures of Ragged Blossom, Snugglepot & Cuddlepie
- Ethel Turner — King Anne

== Drama ==
- Leonard Buderick – The Sundowner
- Louis Esson – The Drovers
- Vance Palmer — A Happy Family

== Births ==
A list, ordered by date of birth (and, if the date is either unspecified or repeated, ordered alphabetically by surname) of births in 1921 of Australian literary figures, authors of written works or literature-related individuals follows, including year of death.

- 25 January — Russell Braddon, novelist (died 1995)
- 3 February — John Millett, poet (died 2019)
- 13 February — Marshall Grover, novelist (died 1993)
- 13 April — Max Harris, poet and editor (died 1995)
- 23 May — Ray Lawler, playwright (died 2024)
- 8 June — Ivan Southall, writer for children (died 2008)
- 19 June — Patricia Wrightson, writer for children (died 2010)
- 27 June — Lex Banning, poet born with cerebral palsy and unable to speak clearly or to write with a pen (died 1965)
- 14 August — Ralph Elliott, critic and academic (born in Germany) (died 2012)
- 17 September — Hugh Atkinson (novelist), novelist, journalist, screenwriter and documentary film maker (died 1994)
- 19 September – Michael Noonan, novelist and radio scriptwriter (born in New Zealand) (died 2000)
- 10 October – James Clavell, novelist, screenwriter, director, and World War II veteran and prisoner of war (died 1994)
- 30 November – Anne Godfrey-Smith, poet and theatre producer/director (died 2011)
- 21 December – T. Harri Jones, Welsh poet who emigrated to Australia (died 1965)
- 25 December — Nan McDonald, poet and editor (died 1974)
- 26 December — Donald Horne, author (died 2010)

== Deaths ==
A list, ordered by date of death (and, if the date is either unspecified or repeated, ordered alphabetically by surname) of deaths in 1921 of Australian literary figures, authors of written works or literature-related individuals follows, including year of birth.

- 22 March — E. W. Hornung, novelist (died in France) (born 1866 in England)
- 28 March — C. Haddon Chambers, playwright (born 1860)
- 18 June — G. Herbert Gibson, poet (born 1846 in England)
- 13 September — James Hebblethwaite, poet (born 1857)

== See also ==
- 1921 in Australia
- 1921 in literature
- 1921 in poetry
- List of years in Australian literature
- List of years in literature
