= Driving Through Sawmill Towns =

1965 poem by Australian poet Les Murray

- by Les Murray
- First published in: The Ilex Tree
- Country: Australia
- Language: English
- Publication date: 1965
- Lines: 37

"Driving Through Sawmill Towns" (1965) is a poem by Australian writer Les Murray. It was originally published in the poet's collection The Ilex Tree, and later included in several of the poet's single-author collections and other poetry anthologies.

== Synopsis ==
The poem describes a drive through isloated mountain towns where the major industry revolves around the town's sawmill. The sawmills have roofs but no walls so it is possible to see directly into their inner workings. In the rest of the town women listen for passing cars and the men sit by their fires in the evenings contemplating their futures.

== Critical reception ==
In his review of Murray's Collected Poems for The Sydney Review of Books critic Geoff Page picked out fourteen of his poems for consideration. Of "Driving Through Sawmill Towns" Page noted that it is "a sequence in four sections and an important introduction to ideas that have marked the rest of his career. It's not the classic Bunyah, NSW, landscape this time but higher up, near the tablelands." Page went on to point out that the "whole poem is an unillusioned but compassionate portrait of a marginal group to whom the poet feels very close. They are yearning at least a little for what it seems they can't have (especially the women)."

Writing about Murray's "treatment of language in poetry" for Australian Literary Studies Theodore Ell noted that, with this poem, "Murray found his way of loosening the bindings of literal meaning around statement and description, drawing more on the sound-texture of language to evoke subjects."

== Publishing history ==
After its initial publication in The Ilex Tree in 1965 the poem was reprinted as follows:

- Gesture of a Hand edited by David Malouf, Rinehart and Winston, 1975
- Selected Poems : The Vernacular Republic by Les Murray, Angus and Robertson, 1976
- The Vernacular Republic : Poems 1961–1981 by Les Murray, Angus and Robertson, 1982
- The Younger Australian Poets edited by Geoffrey Lehmann and Robert Gray, Hale and Iremonger, 1983
- Selected Poems by Les Murray, Carcanet, 1986
- Collected Poems by Les Murray, Heinemann, 1991 (aka ‘’The Rabbiter’s Bounty’’)
- The Faber Book of Modern Australian Verse edited by Vincent Buckley, Faber, 1991
- Collected Poems by Les Murray, Heinemann, 1994
- New Selected Poems by Les Murray, Duffy and Snellgrove, 1998
- New Selected Poems by Les Murray, Farrar Straus and Giroux, 2000
- A Return to Poetry 2000 edited by Michael Duffy, 2000
- Learning Human : New Selected Poems by Les Murray, Carcanet, 2001
- Seven Centuries of Poetry in English edited by John Leonard, Oxford University Press, 2003
- Selected Poems by Les Murray, Black Inc., 2007
- Australian Poetry Since 1788 edited by Geoffrey Lehmann and Robert Gray , University of NSW Press, 2011
- The Best 100 Poems of Les Murray by Les Murray, Black Inc., 2012

The poem was also translated into German in 1996 and Chinese in 2018.

== Notes ==
- The full text of the poem is available on the OpenLibrary digitised version of The Rabbiter's Bounty by Les Murray. pp11–13; and on the Black Inc. website.

== See also ==
- 1965 in Australian literature
- 1965 in poetry
