= Frank Paterson Brown =

Australian rules footballer

Frank Brown
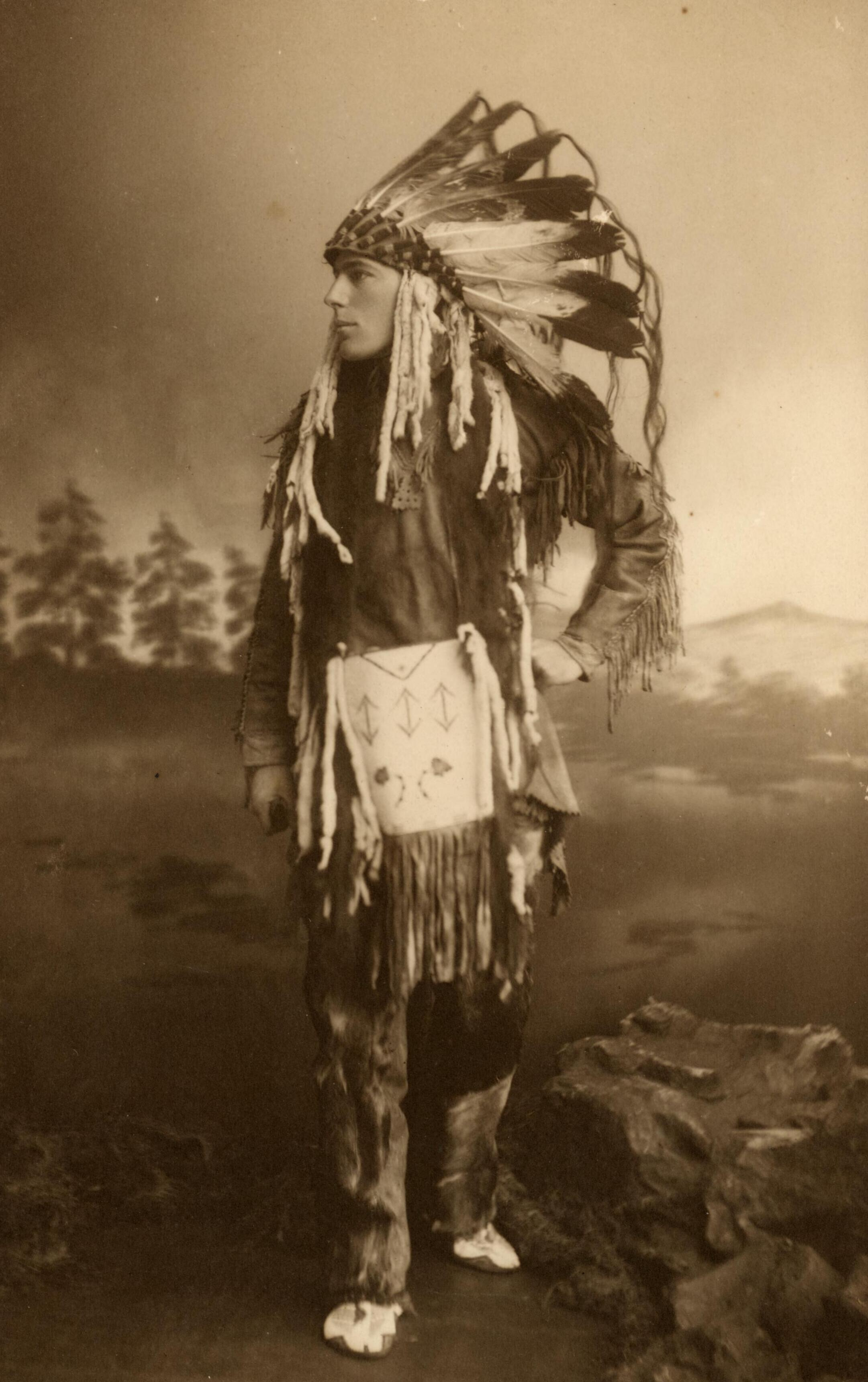
- Photograph of Brown in Native American costume, c. 1910

Personal information
- Full name: Francis Paterson Brown
- Born: 13 November 1887; Berwick, Victoria
- Died: 26 November 1928 (aged 41); St Kilda, Victoria
- Original team: Scotch College

Playing career^{1}
Years	Club	Games (Goals)
1905–06	Melbourne	5 (0)
1907	St Kilda	1 (0)
Total		6 (0)
- ^{1} Playing statistics correct to the end of 1907.

Francis Paterson Brown (13 November 1887 – 26 November 1928) was an Australian sportsman, adventurer and journalist. He was a national champion in the hurdles and represented Australia at the Inter-Empire Championships in 1911. He was also a mining entrepreneur, soldier, and wrestling promoter.

== Early life ==
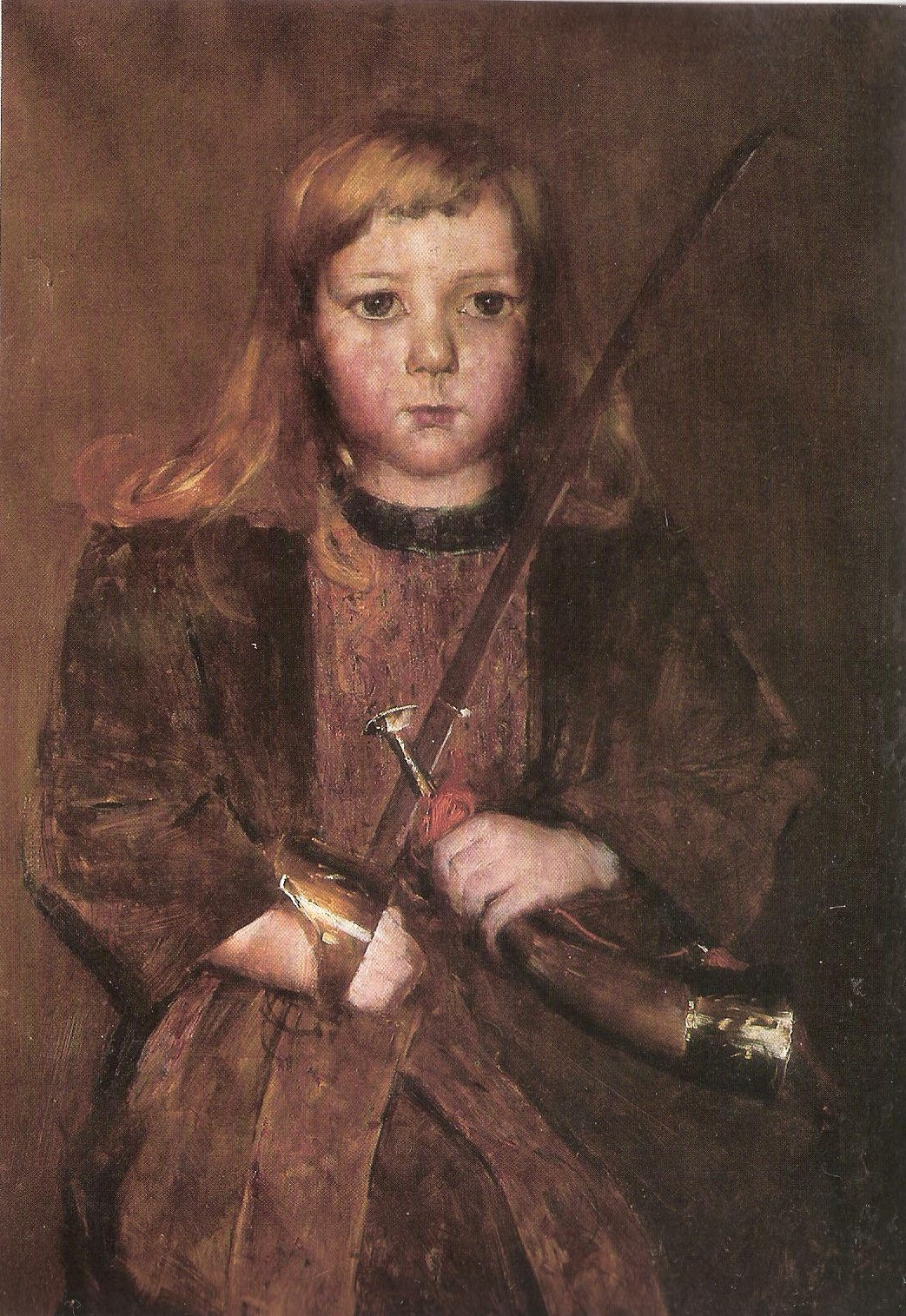
Portrait of Brown as a child by Arthur Streeton, c. 1891

Brown was born on 13 November 1887 in Berwick, Victoria. He was the son of Mary Jane (née Paterson) and George Brown. His older half-brother Louis Esson was a dramatist. His father died in 1897 and his mother remarried to politician James Gibb.

Brown attended Scotch College, Melbourne. As a child he was painted by Arthur Streeton, an acquaintance of his uncle John Ford Paterson; his cousins Esther and Betty Paterson were artists.

== Sporting career ==
Brown excelled at hurdles. He won the 440-yard and one-mile hurdles at the Victorian public school championships in 1904, and the following year won the 440-yard event at the Australian Athletics Championships in Sydney. He was the Victorian champion in the 120-yard hurdles and the 440-yard dash in 1907.

Brown represented Australia at the Inter-Empire Championships in London in 1911. He competed in the 120-yard hurdles event, where he fell while leading the race. He won an international event in Berlin in 1912 and was reportedly presented with a silver cup by Wilhelm, German Crown Prince.

Outside of athletics, Brown played high-level Australian rules football in the Victorian Football League, making five appearances Melbourne in 1905 and 1906 and one appearance for St Kilda in 1907. He was also a talented boxer, wrestler and golfer.

== Other activities ==
In 1909, reputedly at the instigation of Jack London whom he met in Tasmania, Brown undertook to walk overland from Bourke, New South Wales, through the Outback to Darwin. On his journey he took up four mining leases with silver and lead deposits on the Wilton River near Bulman. After returning to Melbourne he formed a syndicate to develop the project and floated the Mount Maroomba Proprietary Company.

Brown enlisted in the Australian Imperial Force in February 1917. He served with the 8th Brigade, Australian Field Artillery, with the rank of gunner. He was discharged in May 1919.

In 1922, Brown joined the staff of the newly created Sporting Globe as athletics editor. He later wrote a column titled "Frank Brown's Sporting Flashes". He was credited with reviving wrestling as a spectator sport in Melbourne, by encouraging Stadiums Limited to bring prominent American wrestlers on tour. He visited the United States on behalf of Stadiums Limited in 1926 to recruit talent.

== Personal life ==
Brown died suddenly on 26 November 1928 at his home in St Kilda, aged 41. He was survived by his wife and son. His obituary in The Herald was written by C. J. Dennis, who observed that "probably no contemporary Australian had such a varied and picturesque career".
