= 1926 in poetry =

Nationality words link to articles with information on the nation's poetry or literature (for instance, Irish or France).

== Events ==
- The remains of English war poet Isaac Rosenberg, killed in World War I (1918) at the age of 28 and originally buried in a mass grave, are re-interred at Bailleul Road East Cemetery, Plot V, St. Laurent-Blangy, Pas de Calais, France.
- Poetry Bookshop in Bloomsbury, London, closes

== Works published ==
=== Canada ===
- William Henry Drummond, Complete Poems, posthumously published.
- Wilson MacDonald, Out Of The Wilderness. Ottawa: Graphic Publishers.
- E. J. Pratt, Titans ("The Cachalot, The Great Feud"), Toronto: Macmillan.
- Theodore Goodridge Roberts, The Lost Shipmate. Toronto: Ryerson Chapbook.
- Duncan Campbell Scott, Collected Poems.
- Frederick George Scott, In Sun and Shade: A Book of Verse] (Québec: Dussault & Proulx).

=== India in English ===
- Swami Anand Acharya, Arctic Swallows and Other Poems ( Poetry in English ),
- The Spirit of Oriental Poetry, London: Kegal Paul, Trench, Trubner & Co., 232 pages; anthology; published in the United Kingdom
- Krishnala M. Jhaveri, Further Milestones in Gujarati Literature written in English and translated into Gujarati; scholarship and criticism

=== United Kingdom ===
- Frank Ashton-Gwatkin (as John Paris), A Japanese Don Juan and other Poems
- Edmund Blunden, English Poems
- W. H. Davies, The Birth of Song
- Loyd Haberly, Cymberina, American poet self-published in the United Kingdom
- Hugh MacDiarmid, pen name of Christopher Murray Grieve, Scots language poet:⁵
  - A Drunk Man Looks at the Thistle
  - Penny Wheep
- Edwin Muir, Chorus of the Newly Dead
- Laura Riding, The Close Chaplet
- Vita Sackville-West, The Land
- Siegfried Sassoon, Satirical Poems
- Kenneth Slessor, Earth-Visitors, London: Fanfrolico Press, Australian poet published in the United Kingdom
- The Spirit of Oriental Poetry, London: Kegal Paul, Trench, Trubner & Co., 232 pages; anthology; Indian poetry in English, published in the United Kingdom
- Humbert Wolfe:
  - Humoresque
  - News of the Devil
- W. B. Yeats, Autobiographies (autobiography), volume 6 of the Collected Edition published by Macmillan

=== United States ===
- Hart Crane, White Buildings
- Countee Cullen, On These I Stand, Harper & Row
- E. E. Cummings, is 5
- John Gould Fletcher, Branches of Adam
- Langston Hughes, The Weary Blues
- Vachel Lindsay:
  - Going to the Stars
  - The Candle in the Cabin
- Amy Lowell, East Wind
- Archibald MacLeish, Streets in the Moon, including "The End of the World"
- Edgar Lee Masters, Lee: A Dramatic Poem
- John G. Neihardt, Collected Poems
- Dorothy Parker, Enough Rope
- Ezra Pound, Personae: The Collected Poems
- Sara Teasdale, Dark of the Moon
- Edith Wharton, Twelve Poems
- Louis Zukofsky completes "Poem beginning 'The'," incorporating fragments of the writings of Dante, Virginia Woolf, and Benito Mussolini, among others

=== Other in English ===
- W. F. Alexander and A. E. Currie, editors, A Treasury of New Zealand Verse, revised version (without preface) of New Zealand Verse, published in 1906, anthology
- Kenneth Slessor, Earth-Visitors, London: Fanfrolico Press, Australian poet published in the United Kingdom

== Works published in other languages ==
=== France ===
- Louis Aragon, Le Mouvement Perpetuel, influenced by Surrealism
- Paul Éluard, pen name of Paul-Eugène Grindel:
  - Dessous d'une vie
  - Capitale de la douleur ("Capital of Pain"); the poems influence Jean-Luc Godard's 1965 film Alphaville, une étrange aventure de Lemmy Caution which has quotations from the book
- Francis Jammes, Ma France poétique, Paris: Mercure de France; France
- Pierre Jean Jouve:
  - Mystérieuses Noces
  - Nouvelles Noces

=== Indian subcontinent ===
Including all of the British colonies that later become India, Pakistan, Bangladesh, Sri Lanka and Nepal. Listed alphabetically by first name, regardless of surname:

- Ahmad Din, Iqbal, a critical work on the poetry of Sir Mohammad Iqbal, Indian, Urdu-language
- Mohanlal Dalicand Desai, Jain Gurjar Kavio, Volume 1, literary history written in Gujarati, delving into Jain poets and including a list of manuscripts; in 1995, Indian literary scholar Sisir Kumar Das calls it a "very useful and important work for students of Gujarati literature" (see also Volume 2 in 1931, Volume 3 1964)
- Ramanbhai Nilkanth, Kavita Ane Sahitya, four volumes of Gujarati poetry and prose; Volume 1, articles on prosody and rhetoric; Volume 2, articles on practical criticism; Volume 3, occasional lectures and essays; Volume 4 (published in 1929), some poems, short stories and essays on humor
- S. Sonusundara Bharati, Tacaratan Kuraiyum Kaikeyi Niraiyum, literary criticism in Tamil

=== Spanish language ===
==== Peru ====
- Enrique Bustamante y Ballivián, Antipoemas
- Alejandro Peralta, Ande
- Enrique Peña Barrenechea, El aroma en la sombra

==== Other in Spanish ====
- Rafael Alberti, La amante ("The Beloved"); Spain
- Germán List Arzubide, El movimiento estridentista, Mexico (history)
- Federico García Lorca, Oda a Salvador Dalí ("Ode to Salvador Dalí"), Spain
- Xavier Villaurrutia, Reflejos, Mexico

=== Other languages ===
- Uri Zvi Greenberg, Ha-Gavrut Ha-Olah ("Manhood on the Rise"), Hebrew language, Mandatory Palestine
- Tin Ujević, Kolajna ("Necklace"), Croatian

== Awards and honors ==
- Pulitzer Prize for Poetry: Amy Lowell, What's O'Clock

== Births ==
Death years link to the corresponding "[year] in poetry" article:

- January 5 – W. D. Snodgrass (died 2009), American poet, academic and winner of the Pulitzer Prize for Poetry in 1960
- February 4 – Albert Saijo (died 2011), Japanese-American poet
- February 18 – A. R. Ammons (died 2001), American author and poet
- February 25 – Russell Atkins (died 2024), African-American concrete poet, musician and playwright
- March 3 – James Merrill (died 1995), American poet and winner of the Pulitzer Prize for Poetry in 1977
- March 22 – Alastair Reid (died 2014), Scottish poet and scholar of South American literature
- April 18 – Niranjan Bhagat (died 2018), Indian poet and critic writing in Gujarati and English
- May 4 – Allen Mandelbaum (died 2011), American poet and translator
- May 21 – Robert Creeley (died 2005), American poet and author associated with the Black Mountain poets
- May 26 – Phyllis Gotlieb (died 2009), Canadian science fiction novelist and poet
- June 3 – Allen Ginsberg (died 1997), American Beat poet
- June 5 – David Wagoner (died 2021), American poet and novelist
- June 25 – Ingeborg Bachmann (died 1973), Austrian poet and author
- June 27 – Frank O'Hara (died 1966), American poet and key member of the New York School of poetry
- June 29 – James K. Baxter (died 1972), New Zealand poet
- July 7 – Anand Mohan Zutshi Gulzar Dehlvi (died 2020), Indian Urdu poet
- July 17 – Nikos Karouzos (died 1990), Greek poet
- July 18 – Elizabeth Jennings (died 2001), English poet
- August 15 – Sukanta Bhattacharya (died 1947), Bengali poet and playwright
- September 1 – James Reaney (died 2008), Canadian poet, playwright and literary critic
- November 5 – John Berger (died 2017), English novelist, painter, art critic and poet
- November 11 – José Manuel Caballero (died 2021) Spanish poet and novelist
- November 23 – Christopher Logue (died 2011), English poet, playwright, screen writer and actor associated with the British Poetry Revival
- November 24 – Paul Blackburn (died 1971), American poet
- December 23 – Robert Bly (died 2021), American poet, author and leader of the mythopoetic men's movement in the United States
- December 26 – Nabakanta Barua, also known as Ekhud Kokaideu (died 2002), Assamese-language Indian novelist and poet

== Deaths ==
Birth years link to the corresponding "[year] in poetry" article:

- January 10 – Eino Leino, 47 (born 1878), Finnish poet and journalist
- January 20 – Charles Montagu Doughty, 82 (born 1843), English poet, writer and traveller
- April 7 – Ozaki Hōsai 尾崎 放哉 pen name of Ozaki Hideo, 41 (born 1885), Japanese late Meiji period and Taishō period poet (surname of this pen name: Ozaki)
- May 30 – Perceval Gibbon, 46 (born 1879), Welsh-born journalist, short-story writer and poet
- June 15 – Francis Joseph Sherman, 55 (born 1871), Canadian poet
- July 19 – Ada Cambridge (married name was Cross, but she kept her maiden name as her pen name), 81 (born 1844), English writer and poet living in Australia after 1870
- August 1 – Israel Zangwill, 62 (born 1864), English writer and poet
- October 9 – Helena Nyblom, 82 (born 1843), Danish-born poet and writer of fairy tales
- November 17 – George Sterling, 56 (born 1869), American poet
- December 29 – Rainer Maria Rilke, 51 (born 1875), German poet, from leukemia

== See also ==
- Poetry
- List of poetry awards
- List of years in poetry
- New Objectivity in German literature and art
