= The Southern Cross (play) =

- Original language: English
- Written by: Louis Esson
- Subject: Eureka Rebellion

The Southern Cross is a 1930 Australian play by Louis Esson about the Eureka Rebellion.

It is not to be confused with the play by Edmund Duggan of the same name.

Esson's play was published in a collection of plays by Esson in 1946.

The Melbourne Argus said "It catches very well the atmosphere of the Eureka Stockade, and the delineation of Peter Lalor makes one's heart warm towards that stalwart."

The Bulletin felt "the people in 'The Southern Cross' are too sketchily drawn and seem imperfectly understood."

Another critic felt the play was "sincere and deeply felt, but it is so episodic with its thirteen scenes, some confused, some static, that it never really comes to grips with its subject."

According to Leslie Rees "Esson's play too literally follows established facts; it is a purely objective presentation of the main events leading into the stockade fight... one does not feel that the author has included anything of himself, except some technical skill. He has not created any people, only copied them from history and from Raffaello. Even apart from this, Esson's version takes a very narrow view of the whole episode, suggesting none of the political undertones and ramifications, the growth of the Reform League, with its list of Chartist demands, and so on. Esson seems to concentrate only on the physical facts of Eureka."
