= Belfast Group =

Poets' workshop

The Belfast Group was a poets' workshop which was organized by Philip Hobsbaum when he moved to Belfast in October 1963 to lecture in English at Queen's University.

As with Hobsbaum's earlier discussion group in London, known as The Group, the meetings commenced with the discussion of a single poet's work. After a break for coffee and biscuits, there was an open session in which participants could read any work they wished to. The group met once a week, initially on Tuesday evenings at 8:00pm, later on Monday evenings. During term time it met at No. 4 Fitzwilliam Street, Philip and Hannah Hobsbaum's home near the university.

Seamus Heaney attended group meetings from the start. Seven of the poems in Heaney's Eleven Poems (November 1965) were taken from his 'group sheets'. Heaney has said that the group "ratified the idea of writing". Michael Longley started attending after his return to Belfast in 1964. He has said that the group gave "an air of seriousness and electricity to the notion of writing", and that he was "surprised by the ferocity of Hobsbaum's attack". Other participants over the years included: James Simmons, Paul Muldoon, Ciarán Carson, Stewart Parker, Bernard MacLaverty, Frank Ormsby and the critics Edna Longley and Michael Allen. Louis Muinzer, the translator and theatre director was also a member of the group.

In 1965 and 1966, the Belfast Festival at Queen's published pamphlets by some of the members of the group, including Heaney, Longley, and this attracted a certain amount of publicity. After Hobsbaum's departure for Glasgow in 1966, the Group lapsed for a while, but then was reconstituted in 1968 by Michael Allen, Arthur Terry, and Heaney. Meetings were held at Seamus and Marie Heaney's house on Ashley Avenue. May 1968 saw the first issue of The Honest Ulsterman, edited by James Simmons.

The Belfast Group ceased to exist in 1972.

== Sources ==
- 'The Belfast Group: A Symposium': The Honest Ulsterman, No. 53 (Nov/Dec 1976)
- The Cambridge Companion to Contemporary Irish Poetry, Cambridge University Press, 2003
