= Stroke (poem) =

1965 poem by Australian poet Vincent Buckley

- by Vincent Buckley
- First published in: Quadrant
- Country: Australia
- Language: English
- Publication date: January–February 1965
- Lines: 161

"Stroke" (1965) is a poem by Australian poet Vincent Buckley.

It was originally published in the literary magazine Quadrant vol. 9 no. 1 January-February 1965, and was subsequently reprinted in the author's single-author collections and a number of Australian poetry anthologies.

This is a seven-poem sequence published under the collective title of "Stroke". Each poem in the sequence is of differing length, and some have been published separately as extracts. For example poem III was published in The Bulletin, on 18 January 1964, under the title "We Suit Our Memories".

== Synopsis ==
The poems describe a son's feelings as he watches his father in hospital suffering from the after-effects of a stroke. He laments the life-time lack of communication between the two and compares memories of his father, when he was fit and well, and now.

== Critical reception ==
The Oxford Companion to Australian Literature states that the poem "conveys, in spite of its calm, almost detached phrasing, that anguish that the son feels, not simply because of the imminent death of his father, but because of the gulf between them that even at the end seems unbridgeable."

John McLaren, writing in Journal of the Association for the Study of Australian Literature about his biography of Buckley and his use of dialogue in his work, noted: "Buckley gives us vivid glimpses of others, and like all poets–although not as frequently as some–puts on different masks and adopts various narrative voices. But these differences are resolved within the poems. It is Buckley the poet who leaves Melbourne at the end of Golden Builders, it is Buckley the son who leaves his dying father at the end of 'Stroke.' These endings are still open to further possibility, but they are quite different from the novelistic ending that completes a narrative distancing of the events. The novel invites us to participate; Buckley invites us to join him in contemplation, in the search for a pattern, for a truth."

== Publication history ==
After the poem's initial publication in Quadrant in 1965 it was reprinted as follows:

- Arcady and Other Places : Poems by Vincent Buckley, Melbourne University Press, 1966
- Modern Australian Writing edited by Geoffrey Dutton, Collins, 1966
- Twelve Poets, 1950-1970 edited by Alexander Craig, Jacaranda Press, 1971
- Australian Verse from 1805 : A Continuum edited by Geoffrey Dutton, Rigby, 1976
- Selected Poems by Vincent Buckley, Angus and Robertson, 1981
- Cross-Country : A Book of Australian Verse edited by John Barnes and Brian MacFarlane, Heinemann, 1984
- Family Ties : Australian Poems of the Family edited by Jennifer Strauss, Oxford University Press, 1998
- 100 Australian Poems You Need to Know edited by Jamie Grant, Hardie Grant, 2008
- The Puncher & Wattmann Anthology of Australian Poetry edited by John Leonard, Puncher & Wattmann, 2009
- Australian Poetry Since 1788 edited by Geoffrey Lehmann and Robert Gray, University of NSW Press, 2011

== See also ==
- 1965 in Australian literature
- 1965 in poetry
