= The Sacred Place =

The Sacred Place is a 1912 Australian play by Louis Esson. It was set amongst Muslims in Melbourne. The play was based on a 1907 short story.

The play was published in 1912.

The play was performed in 1912.

== Radio adaptations ==
The play was adapted for ABC radio in 1938.

The play was recorded for radio again in 1951.
