= The Time Is Not Yet Ripe =

1912 play by Louis Esson

- Original language: English
- Written by: Louis Esson

Premiere
- Date: 23 July 1912
- Place: Athenaeum Hall, Melbourne

The Time Is Not Yet Ripe is a 1912 Australian play by Louis Esson. It is a political comedy and is Esson's best known work.

It was first produced by the Melbourne Repertory Theatre at the Athenaeum Hall in 1912.

The Time Is Not Yet Ripe has since come to be acknowledged as an Australian classic, and was later published. Its first major revival was by the Melbourne Theatre Company at the Comedy Theatre in 1973, and it also received professional productions in Sydney in 1977 and Adelaide in 1984.
