= The Drovers (play) =

1921 Australian play by Louis Esson

- Original language: English
- Written by: Louis Esson
- Genre: drama

The Drovers is a 1921 Australian play by Louis Esson. According to Esson's obituary the play was his "finest piece... one scene, one simple incident; it was what he could do; be never did anything better; and no one else did, either."

It was published in a collection of plays in 1920 and 1945. The play was published before it had been performed.

Leslie Rees called The Drovers:

A play that will stand reading and rereading... Each character is dry-pointed, hardly more than a line-sketch in so brief a compass—... but definite and clear. The situation has some of the inevitability of a Greek tragedy. No play of ours more powerfully shows the grimness of a fate that broods over men who pit themselves against our vast inland wilderness.

== Radio adaptations ==
The play was adapted for radio in 1940, 1943 and 1946.

== Premise ==
"The Play tells of Briglow Hill, the injured drover, left to die on the track because the parched cattle must be driven on to a distant waterhole at all costs."
