= Tom Marshall (poet) =

Canadian poet, critic and novelist

- Born: Thomas Archibald Marshall; April 9, 1938; Niagara Falls, Ontario
- Died: April 28, 1993 (aged 55); Kingston, Ontario
- Education: Queen's University
- Known for: Poet, critic and novelist
- Notable work: The Essential Tom Marshall, 2012

Thomas Archibald Marshall (April 9, 1938 – April 28, 1993) was a Canadian poet, critic and novelist.

Born in Niagara Falls, Ontario, he grew up in the United States. He was educated at Queen's University in Kingston, where he received his MA in 1965, writing his thesis on poet A. M. Klein. Marshall taught at the institution from 1964 until his death.

Marshall was the author of numerous poetry collections and novels, the poetry editor of Canadian Forum and the chief editor of Quarry.

At the time of his death in 1993, Marshall had completed a final novel, The Adventures of John Montgomery. The novel was posthumously published in 1995, and was reissued in 2014 as part of a series of historical novels set in Kingston. The Essential Tom Marshall, an anthology of his poetry compiled by David Helwig and Michael Ondaatje, was published in 2012.

== Publications ==
=== Poetry ===
- The Beast With Three Backs, (with Tom Eadie and Colin Norman.) Quarry Press, Kingston, n.d.. (1965)
- The Silences of Fire. Macmillan, Toronto, 1969.
- Magic Water. Quarry Press, Kingston, 1971.
- The Earth Book. Ottawa, Oberon Press, 1974.
- The White City. Ottawa, Oberon Press, 1976.
- The Elements. Ottawa, Oberon Press, 1980.
- Playing with Fire. Ottawa, Oberon Press, 1984.
- Dance of the Particles. Kingston, Quarry Press, 1984.
- Ghost Safari. Ottawa, Oberon Press, 1991.
- Some Impossible Heaven of the Senses. Ottawa, Oberon Press, 1994.
- The Essential Tom Marshall, 2012

=== Criticism ===
- The Psychic Mariner: A Reading of the Poems of D.H. Lawrence. London and New York: Heineman and Viking Press, 1970. ISBN 9780670581900
- A. M. Klein. Edited and with an introduction by Tom Marshall. Toronto, Ryerson Press, 1970. ISBN 9780770003104
- Harsh and Lovely Land:The Major Canadian Poets and the Making of a Canadian Tradition. Vancouver, University of British Columbia Press, 1979. ISBN 9780774801072
- Multiple Exposures, Promised Lands:Essays on Canadian Poetry and Fiction. Kingston, Quarry Press, 1992. ISBN 9781550820478

=== Fiction ===
- Rosemary Goal. Ottawa, Oberon Press, 1978. (Harper Collins, paper.)
- Glass Houses. Ottawa, Oberon Press, 1985.
- Adele at the End of the Day. Toronto, Macmillan, 1987. (Vintage Books, 1990.)
- Voices on the Brink. Toronto, Macmillan, 1988. (Faber and Faber, paper.)
- Changelings. Toronto, Macmillan, 1991. (McClelland and Stewart, paper.)
- Goddess Disclosing. Kingston, Quarry Press, 1992
- The Adventures of John Montgomery. Kingston, Quarry Press, 1995.
