= Capitale de la douleur =

1926 book of poems by Paul Éluard

Capitale de la douleur (Capital of Pain) is a book of poems by French surrealist poet Paul Éluard. The collection was first published in 1926.

== Table of contents ==
- Répétitions
- Mourir de ne pas mourir
- Les petits justes
- Nouveaux poèmes.

== Publication ==
- Paris, Nouvelle revue française [1926]

== Influence ==
In 1965, Jean-Luc Godard adapted several of the concepts in Éluard's poetry in his film Alphaville and quoted from it throughout. The main character can also be seen to be reading the book.

== See also ==
- Le Monde's 100 Books of the Century
