= Louis Esson =

Australian poet, journalist and playwright

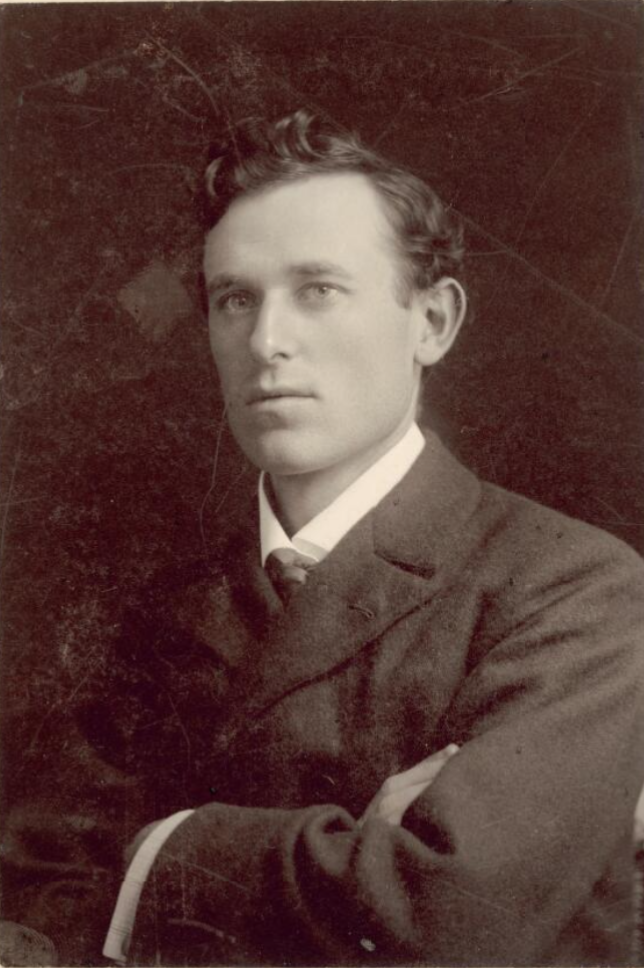
Louis Esson in 1900

Thomas Louis Buvelot (Note: Sometimes spelled Bouvelot, he was named for Louis Buvelot, founder of the Heidelberg school.) Esson (10 August 1878 – 27 November 1943) was a Scottish-born Australian poet, journalist, critic and playwright. He was a co-founder of the Pioneer Players. His second wife, Hilda Esson (nee Bull), had a career in theatre besides working as a doctor in the field of public health.

== Early life and education ==
Esson was born on 10 August 1878 at Leith in Edinburgh, Scotland, but moved to Melbourne, Australia, when he was three, along with his widowed mother. She had siblings in Melbourne, including artist John Ford Paterson, and Esson was raised mostly by his aunts. His mother remarried twice: first to George Brown, with whom she had another son Frank Brown, and secondly to politician James Gibb.

He attended the University of Melbourne from 1896, but did not finish his arts degree.

== Career ==
Esson began working as a journalist and playwright afterwards, and visited London, Ireland, and Paris in 1904–1905. He met Irish playwrights J. M. Synge (in Paris) and W. B. Yeats (in Dublin), who suggested that he writes plays with Australian themes. He returned to Melbourne in 1906, hoping to establish the equivalent of the Irish National Theatre.

His first collection of poetry was published in 1910, with three collections of plays following by 1912, including Dead Timber.

He and his second wife Hilda moved to New York City in 1916 and then to London in 1918, returning in June 1921.

In 1921 he was a co-founder of the Pioneer Players with Vance Palmer and Stewart Macky. The company was dedicated to the performance of Australian plays and the development of a national theatre. The Pioneer Players produced 18 new Australian plays in their four years of existence. John McCallum, writing in The Weekend Australian in 1999, write that the Pioneer Players had been called "a mismanaged collection of fly-by-night amateurs, but somehow he has come to be called 'The Father of Australian drama'". Hilda acted in several of their productions.

He moved to Sydney in 1930.

== Personal life ==
He married first Madeleine Stephanie Tracy in 1906, which ended in divorce in 1911. They had one child, James Paterson Esson (died 1971).

He married Hilda Wager Bull (1886–1953) in December 1913, who, as Hilda Esson, became a force in her own right. She had qualified as a medical doctor at the University of Melbourne in 1913, and was a founding member of the Melbourne University Dramatic Society. After marrying, she provided economic, intellectual and emotional support to her husband, and acted in Pioneer Players productions. She later worked as a doctor in the field of public health.

== Bibliography ==
=== Collections ===
- Belles and Bees: Verses – poetry (1910)
- Three Short Plays – drama (1911)
- Red Gums and Other Verses – poetry (1912)
- Dead Timber and Other Plays – drama (1920)
- The Southern Cross and Other Plays – drama (1946)

=== Selected plays ===
- The Drovers
- The Woman Tamer (1910)
- Dead Timber (1911)
- The Time is Not Yet Ripe (1912)
- The Sacred Place (1912)
- The Drovers (1922)
- Mother and Son (1923)
- The Bride of Gospel Place (1926)

=== Selected poems ===
- "Brogan's Lane" (1906)
