= Quarry Press =

Canadian publishing company

Quarry Press was a Canadian publishing company based in Kingston, Ontario. Established in 1965 at Queen's University, the company experienced financial difficulties in the 1990s and became a subsidiary of Stoddart Publishing in 1995.

== History ==
Quarry Press was established in 1965 at Queen's University in Kingston by the poets Tom Eadie, Tom Marshall, and Colin Norman. The company was created with the intent of publishing poetry and fiction by unknown Canadian writers.

In 1986, Bob Hilderley took control of Quarry Press and expanded the scope of its publications. By the 1990s, the company was publishing up to 20 books per year encompassing children's literature, radio plays, biography, criticism, poetry and fiction.

In addition to publishing books, Quarry Press also produced the literary magazines Quarry Magazine and Poetry Canada Review. The company purchased Canadian Fiction Magazine in 1996.

The company began to experience financial difficulties in the 1990s, and in 1995 it became a subsidiary of Stoddart Publishing of Toronto.
