= The Ilex Tree =

1965 poetry collection by Les Murray and Geoffrey Lehmann

- Author: Les Murray and Geoffrey Lehmann
- Cover artist: Roderick Shaw
- Language: English
- Genre: Poetry collection
- Publisher: ANU Press
- Publication date: 1965
- Publication place: Australia
- Media type: Print
- Pages: 71 pp.
- Awards: 1965 Grace Leven Prize for Poetry, winner

The Ilex Tree is a collection of poems by Australian poets Les Murray and Geoffrey Lehmann, published by ANU Press in 1965.

The collection contains 43 poems (25 by Murray and 18 by Lehmann) from a variety of sources, with some being published here for the first time.

The collection won the Grace Leven Prize for Poetry in 1965.

== Contents ==
- "The Japanese Barge" by Les Murray
- "Property" by Les Murray
- "The Singer's Nag" by Les Murray
- "Privacy" by Les Murray
- "Love after Loneliness" by Les Murray
- "Dolores (Poem for Poor Dolores)" by Les Murray
- "Personality" by Les Murray
- "Artificial Harbour" by Les Murray
- "Agitation" by Les Murray
- "Tableau in January" by Les Murray
- "The Trainee, 1914" by Les Murray
- "A New England Farm, August 1914" by Les Murray
- "The Burning Truck" by Les Murray
- "Les Paras" by Les Murray
- "Deck-Chair Story" by Les Murray
- "The Winter Rising" by Les Murray
- "Manoeuvres" by Les Murray
- "Minuet" by Les Murray
- "A Poem for Valerie" by Les Murray
- "The Widower in the Country" by Les Murray
- "Noonday Axeman" by Les Murray
- "Beside the Highway" by Les Murray
- "The Away-Bound Train" by Les Murray
- "Spring Hail" by Les Murray
- "Driving Through Sawmill Towns" by Les Murray
- "The Traveller Hasteth Through the Evening" by Geoffrey Lehmann
- "An Image" by Geoffrey Lehmann
- "Old Man Possum" by Geoffrey Lehmann
- "Summer Night" by Geoffrey Lehmann
- "Late Autumn" by Geoffrey Lehmann
- "The Last Campaign" by Geoffrey Lehmann
- "Emperor Mao and the Sparrows" by Geoffrey Lehmann
- "Pope Alexander Farewells His Daughter" by Geoffrey Lehmann
- "Christmas Beetle" by Geoffrey Lehmann
- "Lines for a Chinese Tear-Jar" by Geoffrey Lehmann
- "The Pigs" by Geoffrey Lehmann
- "Pieces for My Father" by Geoffrey Lehmann
- "IV (from Pieces for My Father)" by Geoffrey Lehmann
- "Two Photographs" by Geoffrey Lehmann
- "For William Rainer My Grandfather" by Geoffrey Lehmann
- "Meditations for Marcus Furius Camillus, Governor of Africa : The Dolphins" by Geoffrey Lehmann
- "Meditations for Marcus Furius Camillus, Governor of Africa : Meditation in Old Age" by Geoffrey Lehmann
- "Meditations for Marcus Furius Camillus, Governor of Africa : The Lions" by Geoffrey Lehmann

== Critical reception ==
Reviewing the collection in The Bulletin poet Vivian Smith noted that the subjects of Murray's poems "range from the sawmill towns to the aboriginal settlement, to love and the seasons" and he "draws from his childhood", while Lehmann's come "from family history". Smith concluded that Lehmann and Murray "belong to the small group of Australian poets under thirty whose development one will watch with the keenest interest."

Dennis Douglas, writing in The Age, commented that while there "are a number of uncertain poems in the volume" the level "of achievement in the very good ones is high enough to suggest that as poets Les Murray and Geoffrey Lehmann have gained a stage of maturity of which they can justly be proud."

== See also ==
- 1965 in Australian literature
