= Paul Éluard =

French poet (1895–1952)

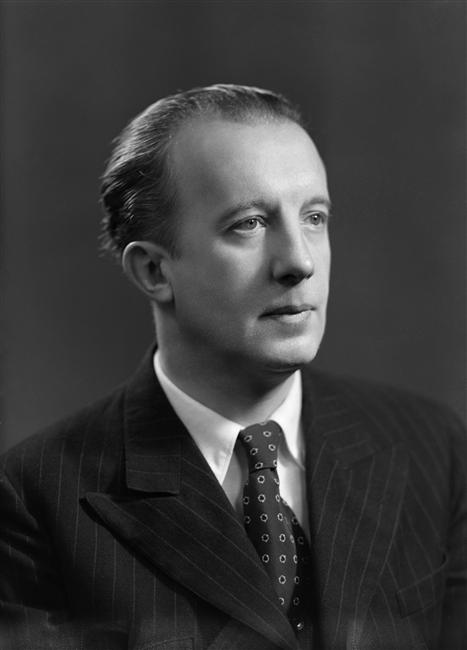
- Éluard c. 1945
- Born: Eugène Émile Paul Grindel; 14 December 1895; Saint-Denis, France
- Died: 18 November 1952 (aged 56); Charenton-le-Pont, France
- Education: École Supérieure de Colbert
- Occupation: Writer
- Spouses: Gala Dalí (m. 1917; div. 1929) Maria Benz (Nusch) (m. 1934; died 1946) Dominique Lemort (m. 1951)
- Children: Cécile Eluard
- Writing career
- Period: 20th century
- Genre: Poetry
- Notable work: Liberté
- Literary movement: Surrealism

Paul Éluard (French: [elɥar]), born Eugène Émile Paul Grindel ([ɡʁɛ̃dɛl]; 14 December 1895 – 18 November 1952), was a French poet and one of the founders of the Surrealist movement.

In 1916, he chose the name Paul Éluard, a matronymic borrowed from his maternal grandmother. He adhered to Dadaism and became one of the pillars of Surrealism by opening the way to artistic action politically committed to the Communist Party.

During World War II, he was the author of several poems against Nazism that circulated clandestinely. He became known worldwide as The Poet of Freedom and is considered the most gifted of French surrealist poets.

== Biography ==
=== Early life ===
Éluard was born on 14 December 1895 in Saint-Denis, Seine-Saint-Denis, the son of Eugène Clément Grindel and wife Jeanne-Marie née Cousin. His father was an accountant when Paul was born but soon opened a real-estate agency. His mother was a seamstress. Around 1908, the family moved to Paris, rue Louis Blanc. Éluard attended the local school in Aulnay-sous-Bois, before obtaining a scholarship to attend the École Supérieure de Colbert. At the age of 16, he contracted tuberculosis, interrupted his studies, and remained hospitalized until April 1914 in the Clavadel sanatorium near Davos.

There he met a young Russian girl of his age, Helena Diakonova, whom he nicknamed Gala. He confided to her his dream of becoming a poet, of his admiration for "poets dead of hunger, sizzling dreams" and of his parents' disapproval. She wrote to him that "you will become a great poet". They became inseparable. She believed in him and gave him confidence and encouragement and provided him with the sense of security he needed to write. She listened and was involved in the creation of his verses. She became his muse and the critic, always honest, and told him which images she preferred, which verses she disliked. He was then particularly inspired by Walt Whitman. In Clavadel, Éluard also met the Brazilian youngster Manuel Bandeira, who would become one of the foremost poets of the Portuguese language. They became friends during their hospitalization in the sanatorium, and kept in touch by mail after returning to their respective countries.

=== First World War ===
In April 1914, Éluard and Gala were both declared healthy again and sent home, to Paris and Moscow respectively. The separation was brutal; soon Europe was on the brink of war and Éluard was mobilised. He passed his physical and was assigned to the auxiliary services because of his poor health. He suffered from migraine, bronchitis, cerebral anaemia, and chronic appendicitis and spent most of 1915 under treatment in a military hospital not far from home. Éluard's mother came to visit him and he talked for hours about his beloved, opening his heart to her and slowly rallying her to his cause. Her initial hostility towards Gala slowly faded away, and she started calling her "the little Russian". However, Éluard's father, who had also been mobilized, remained adamant that she could not come to Paris.

In Moscow, Gala listened to no one. Her love for Éluard gave her an unshakable faith that they would be reunited again. She wrote to his mother to befriend her and finally convinced her stepfather to let her go to Paris to study French at the Sorbonne. She took a boat to Helsinki, then reached Stockholm before embarking for England. Once in London, she took a train to Southampton before taking a boat to Dieppe, and finally took a train to Paris.

In June 1916, Éluard was sent to Hargicourt to work in one of the military evacuation hospitals, 10 kilometers from the front line. The 'poet' was given a chair, a desk, and a pen to painfully write to the families of the dead and the wounded. He wrote more than 150 letters a day. At night, he dug graves to bury the dead. For the first time since Clavadel, shaken by the horrors of the war, he started writing verses again. Gala wrote to him: "I promise you our life will be glorious and magnificent."

On 14 December 1916, Éluard turned 21 and wrote to his mother: "I can assure you, that your approval will be infinitely precious to me. However, for all our sake, nothing will change my mind." He married Gala on 20 February 1917. However, he announced to his parents and newlywed wife that when he returned to the front line, he would voluntarily join the "real soldiers" in the trenches. Gala protested and threatened to return to Russia to become a nurse on the Russian front. But nothing would do, and for the first time, Éluard resisted her. "Let me live a tougher life," he wrote her, "less like a servant, less like a domestic." Two days after getting married, Éluard left for the front line.

There, living conditions were severe. Éluard wrote to his parents, "Even the strongest are falling. We advanced 50 kilometres, three days without bread or wine." His health suffered. On 20 March 1917, he was sent to a military hospital with incipient pleurisy.

On 11 May 1918, Gala gave birth to a baby girl who was eventually named Cécile (died 10 August 2016).

=== Interwar period ===
In 1919, Éluard wrote to Gala: "War is coming to an end. We will now fight for happiness after having fought for Life". Waiting to be sent home, he published "Duty and Anxiety" and "Little Poems for Peace". Following the advice of his publisher, he sent the poems to various personalities of the literary world who took a stand against the war. Gala helped him to prepare and send the letters. In 1919, Jean Paulhan, an eminent academic and writer, responded to his letter expressing his admiration. He referred him to three young writers who had started a new journal called Literature. He encouraged Éluard to go and meet them.

The three young poets Paulhan recommended to Éluard were André Breton, Philippe Soupault, and Louis Aragon.

The meeting with Éluard took place in March 1919. Éluard was intimidated. He was shy and blushing. He was still a soldier and wearing his war uniform. It was the best omen for the three poets, who all showed great courage during the war. Éluard brought with him his poems and read them to the "jury". They were seduced by the young man and liked his work. They decided to publish one of his texts in the next edition of Littérature.

Wounded and scarred by the war, the four poets found solace in their friendship and poetry. Against a society that wanted to channel them into being good and useful citizens, they chose a life of bohemia. They refused the bourgeois middle-class aspirations of money, respectability, and comfort and rejected its moral codes. They hated politicians and the military or anyone with ambitions of power. They rejected all constraints. Their ideal was freedom and they felt they had already paid the price for it. Revolted and passionate, they were looking for a new ideal, something as far detached as possible from the current political and philosophical programmes. They found solace in the Dadaist movement, which originated in Switzerland.

In November 1921, Éluard and Gala visited Max Ernst at his home in Cologne. Éluard had an immediate and an absolute sympathy for Max. Underneath the charm, Ernst, like Éluard, was a man deeply revolted, in total rupture with society. Unlike Éluard, however, Ernst remained indifferent to propagating this revolt which he considered to be an intimate "elegance".

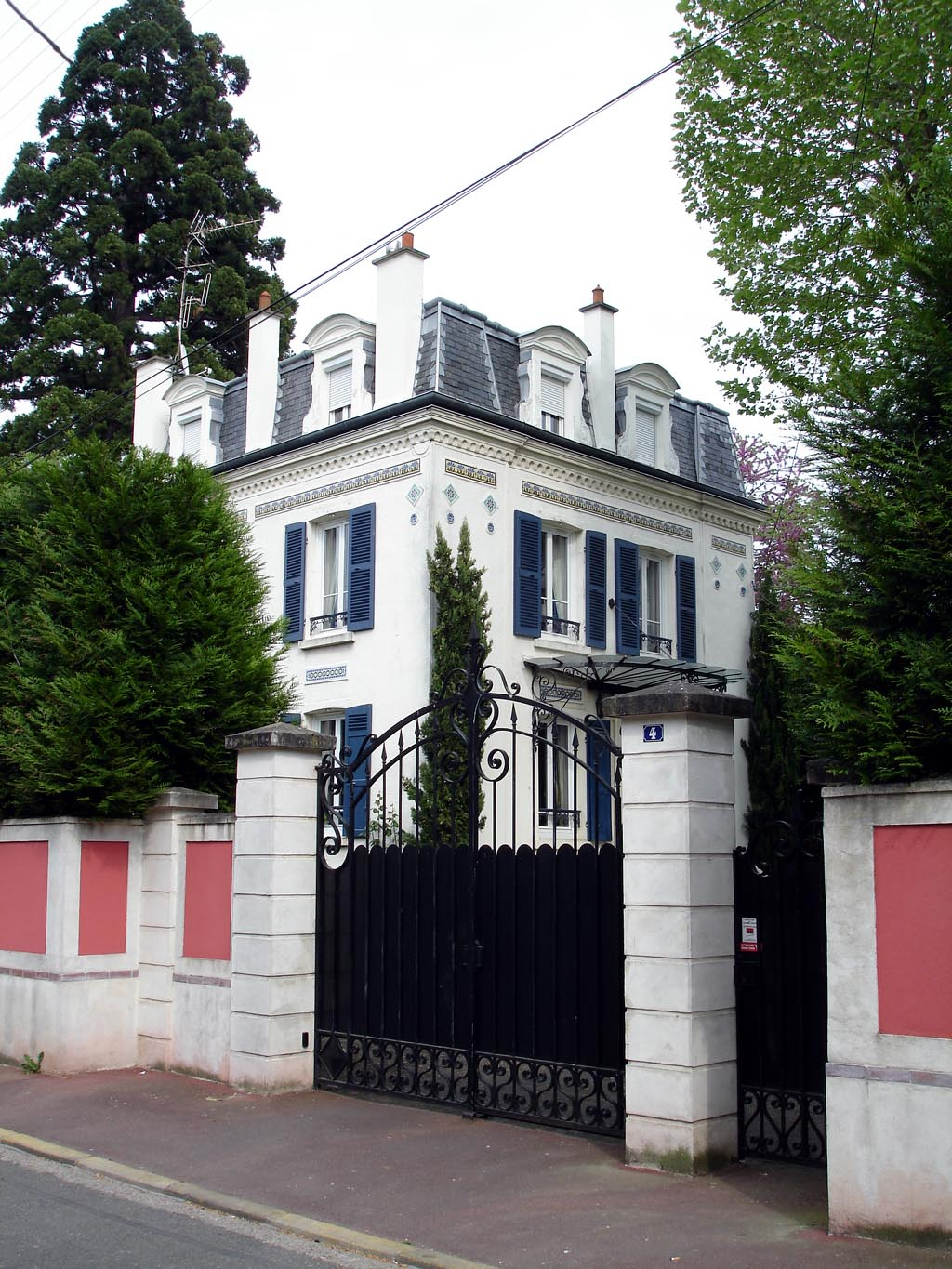
House, in Eaubonne (northern suburb of Paris), where, in 1923, Éluard and Gala were joined by Max Ernst, who decorated the interior of the house.

Éluard and Gala moved to a house just outside Paris and were joined by Max Ernst, who entered France illegally, using Éluard's passport. Jean Paulhan once more helped Éluard by providing Ernst with fake identity papers. Éluard, Ernst, and Gala entered into a ménage à trois in 1922. Éluard was torn between his love for Gala and his friendship for Ernst. He refused to challenge Gala, and spent his nights in clubs: the Zelli, the Cyrano, the Parrot, and Mitchell. Gala's well-being was still what mattered to him above all, and he tried to forget his anxiety by drinking.

Éluard, depressed, wrote "Dying of Not Dying". On 24 March 1924, he disappeared, embarking on a journey around the world. No one knew where he was. The night before, he had had a worrisome meeting with Louis Aragon, during which Éluard confessed that he wanted to put an end to a present that tortured him. For his friends, he was gone forever. But Éluard wrote to Gala and four months later, she bought a ticket to go and find him and bring him back, locating him in Saigon.

Éluard supported the Moroccan Revolution, as early as 1925, and in January 1927, he joined the French Communist Party together with Aragon, Breton, Benjamin Péret, and Pierre Unik. All explained their decision in a collective document entitled Au grand jour. It was during these years that Éluard published two of his main works: Capitale de la douleur (1926) and L'Amour la Poésie (1929). Éluard's poetry collection L'Évidence Poétique Habitude de la Poésie was translated into Arabic and published in the Egyptian magazine Al Tatawwur in 1940.

In 1928, he had another bout of tuberculosis and returned to the Clavadel sanatorium with Gala. It was their last winter together. Gala met Salvador Dalí soon after and remained with him for the rest of her life.

=== 1930s ===
In 1934, Éluard married Nusch (Maria Benz), a music hall artist, whom he had met through his friends Man Ray and Pablo Picasso.

The period from 1931 to 1935 were among Éluard's happiest years. He was excluded from the French Communist Party. He travelled through Europe as an ambassador of the Surrealist movement. In 1936, in Spain, he learned of the Franquist counterrevolution, against which he protested violently. The following year, the bombing of Guernica inspired him to write the poem "The Victory of Guernica". During these two terrible years for Spain, Éluard and Picasso were inseparable. The poet told the painter: "You hold the flame between your fingers and paint like a fire."

=== Second World War ===
Mobilized in September 1939, he moved to Paris with Nusch after the Armistice of 22 June 1940. In January 1942, he sent her to the home of some of his friends, Christian and Yvonne Zervos, near Vézelay—near the maquis. Éluard asked to rejoin the French Communist Party, which was illegal in Occupied France. Thousands of copies of the twenty-one stanzas of his poem "Liberté", first published in the Choix revue, were parachuted from British aircraft over Occupied France. During the war, he also wrote Les sept poèmes d'amour en guerre (1944) and En Avril 1944: Paris Respirait Encore! (1945, illustrated by Jean Hugo).

In 1943, together with Pierre Seghers, François Lachenal, and Jean Lescure, he assembled the texts of several poets of the Resistance in a controversial book called L'Honneur des poètes (The Honour of Poets). Faced with oppression, the poets eulogised in it hope and freedom. In November 1943, Éluard found refuge in the mental asylum of Saint-Alban, headed by doctor Lucien Bonnafé, in which many resistants and Jews were hiding. At Libération, Éluard and Aragon were hailed as the great poets of the Resistance.

=== Post-war ===
On 28 November 1946, during a stay in Switzerland, Éluard learned of Nusch's sudden death from a stroke. Distraught, he became extremely depressed. Two friends, Alain and Jacqueline Trutat (for whom Éluard wrote Corps mémorable), gave him back the will to live.

His grief at the premature death of his wife Nusch in 1946 inspired the work Le temps déborde in 1947, as well as "De l'horizon à l'horizon de tous", which traced the path that led Éluard from suffering to hope.

The principles of peace, self-government, and liberty became his new passion. He was a member of the Congress of Intellectuals for Peace in Wrocław in April 1948, which persuaded Pablo Picasso to also join. The following year, in April, he was a delegate to the Council for World Peace, at the conference held at the Salle Pleyel in Paris. In June 1949, he spent a few days with Greek partisans entrenched on the Gramos hills to fight against Greek government soldiers. He then went to Budapest to attend the commemorative celebrations of the centenary of the death of the poet Sándor Petőfi. There he met Pablo Neruda. In September, he was in Mexico for a new peace conference. There he met Dominique Lemort, with whom he returned to France. They married in 1951. The same year, Éluard published Le Phénix (The Phoenix), a collection of poems dedicated to his reborn happiness. Among his best known quotations is: "There are other worlds, but they are all inside this one".

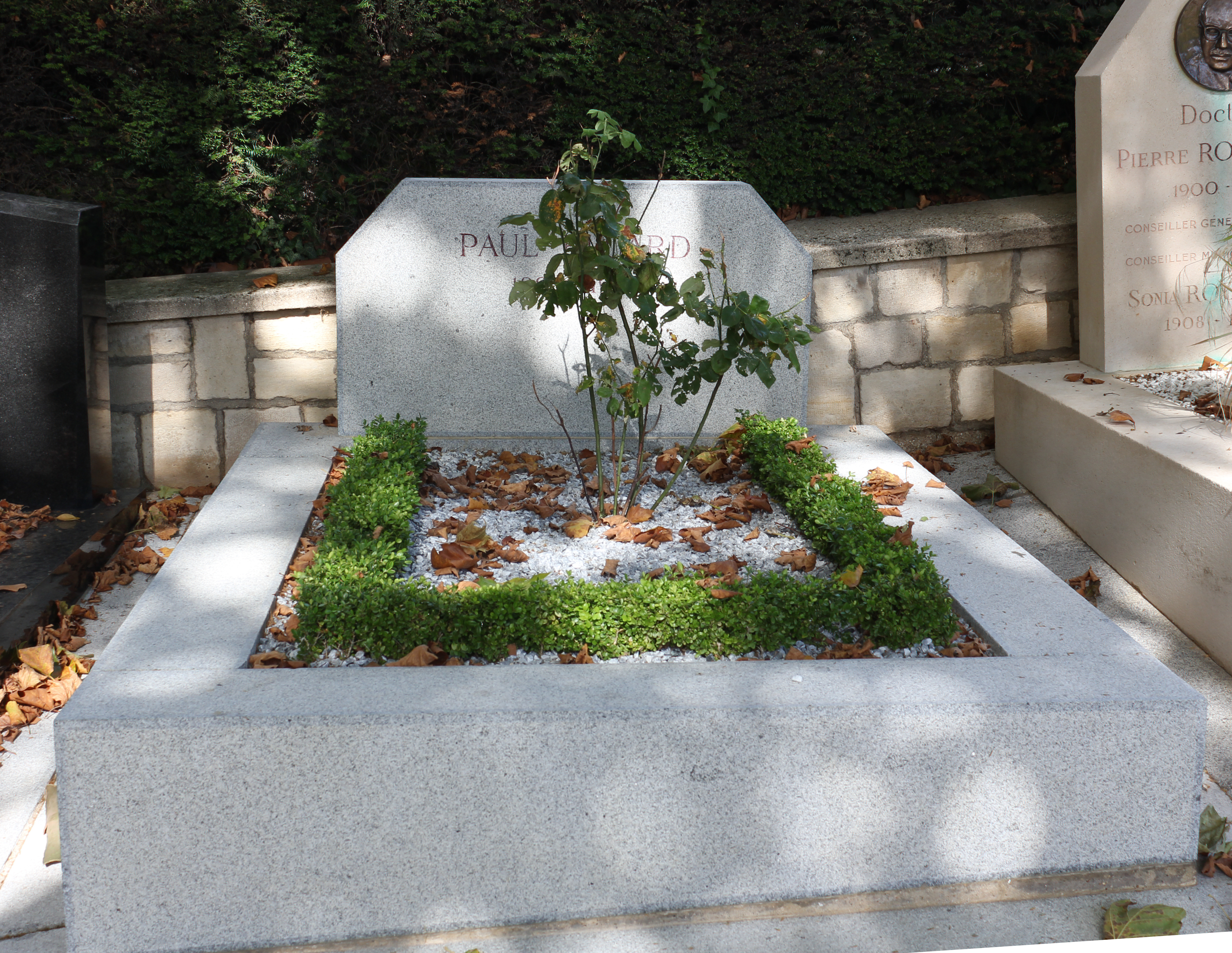
Éluard's grave in Père Lachaise Cemetery, Paris

He later eulogised Joseph Stalin in his political writings. He even wrote a poem — Ode à Staline — for him. Milan Kundera recalled that he was shocked to hear of Éluard's public approval of the hanging of Éluard's friend, the Prague writer Záviš Kalandra in 1950.

=== Death ===
Paul Éluard died from a heart attack on 18 November 1952 at his home, 52 avenue de Gravelle, in Charenton-le-Pont. His funeral was held at the Père Lachaise Cemetery, and organized by the French Communist Party; the French government having refused to organise a national funeral.

== Works ==
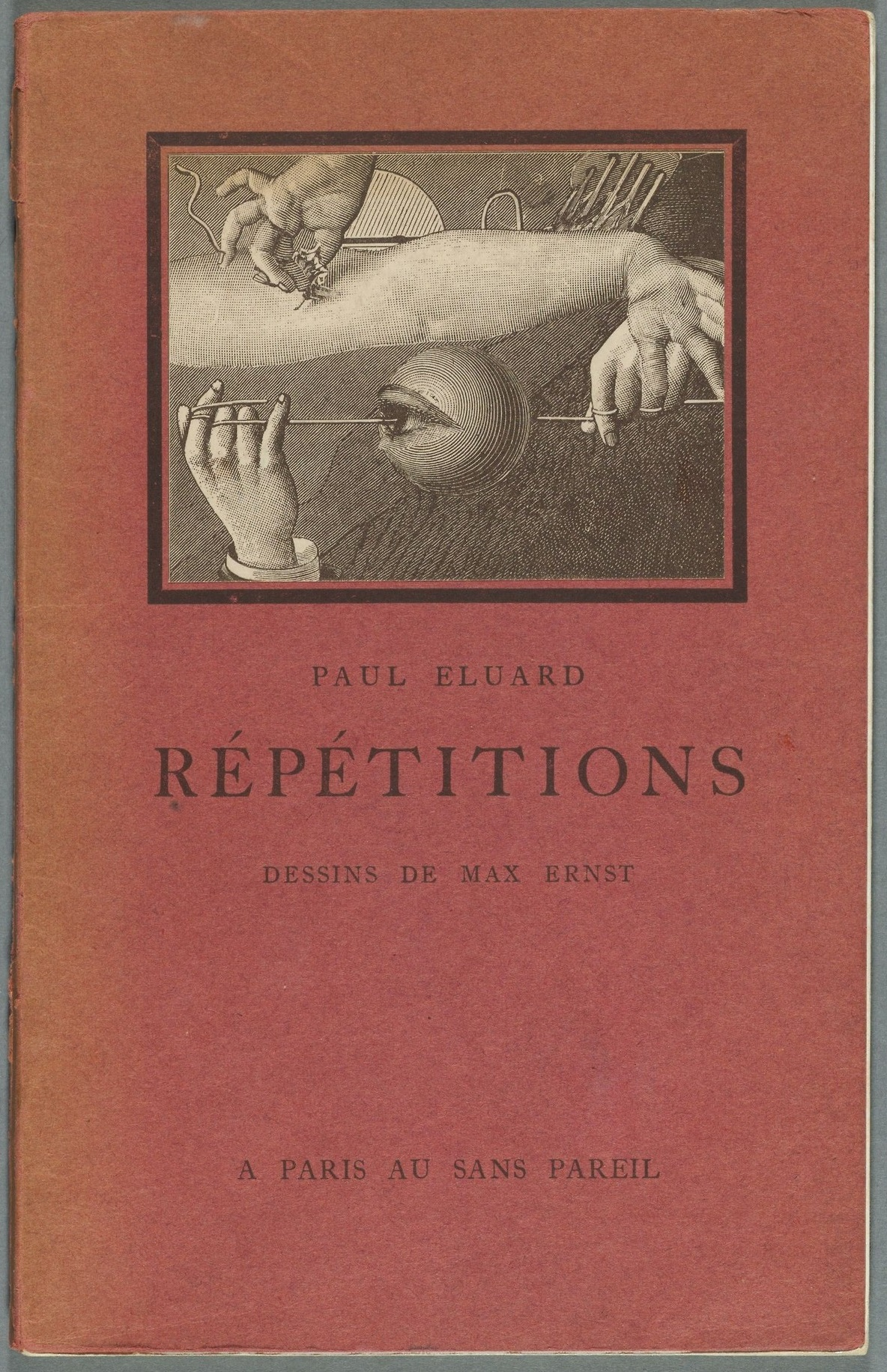
Répétitions, with cover by Max Ernst, 1922

- Premiers poèmes, 1913
- Le Devoir, 1916
- Le Devoir et l'Inquiétude, 1917, (Artist's book with one etching by André Deslignères)
- "Pour Vivre ici", 1918
- Les Animaux et leurs hommes, les hommes et leurs animaux, 1920
- Répétitions, 1922
- "L'Amoureuse", 1923
- "La courbe de tes yeux", 1924
- Mourir de ne pas mourir, 1924
- Au défaut du silence, 1925
- "Place du Tertre", 1925, peinture à l'huile
- "La Dame de carreau", 1926
- Capitale de la douleur, 1926
- Les Dessous d'une vie ou la Pyramide humaine, 1926
- L'Amour la Poésie, 1929
- Ralentir travaux, 1930, in collaboration with André Breton and René Char
- À toute épreuve, 1930
- "L'immaculée conception", 1930
- Défense de savoir, 1932
- La Vie immédiate, 1932
- La Rose publique, 1934
- Facile, 1935
- Les Yeux fertiles, 1936
- Quelques-uns des mots qui jusqu'ici m'étaient mystérieusement interdits, 1937
- L'Évidence Poétique Habitude de la Poésie, 1937
- "Les Mains libres" in collaboration with Man Ray, 1938
- Cours naturel, 1938
- "La victoire de Guernica" 1938
- Donner à voir, 1939
- "Je ne suis pas seul", 1939
- "Le Livre ouvert" 1941
- Poésie et vérité 1942, 1942
- "Liberté", 1942
- Avis, 1943
- "Courage", 1943
- Les Sept poèmes d'amour en guerre, 1943
- Au rendez-vous allemand, 1944
- Poésie ininterrompue, 1946
- Le Cinquième Poème visible, 1947
- Notre vie, 1947
- À l'intérieur de la vue, 1947
- La Courbe de tes yeux, 1947
- Le temps déborde, 1947
- Ode à Staline, 1950
- Le Phénix, 1951
- Picasso, dessins, 1952

== Selected translations into English ==
- Eluard, Paul; Kendall, Stuart (2007). Paul Eluard - Love, Poetry. Black Widow Press. ISBN 9780976844976. OCLC 81252722. Bilingual edition of L'amour la poesie (1929). Includes Stuart Kendall's English translations and introduction.
