= Geoffrey Lehmann =

Australian poet (born 1940)

- Born: 28 June 1940 (age 86); McMahons Point, Sydney, Australia
- Education: Sydney Church of England Grammar School; University of Sydney
- Occupation: Poet
- Relatives: Claire Lehmann (daughter-in-law)

Geoffrey Lehmann (born 28 June 1940) is an Australian poet, children's writer, and tax lawyer.

== Biography ==
Lehmann grew up in McMahons Point, Sydney, and attended the Sydney Church of England Grammar School in North Sydney. He graduated in arts and law from the University of Sydney in 1960 and 1963 respectively. In 1961, he demonstrated in a student newspaper article that fellow student Robert Hughes had published plagiarised poetry by Terence Tiller and others, and a drawing by Leonard Baskin.

Lehmann was the first Australian poet to be published by the London publishing house Faber & Faber.

Lehmann has worked as a solicitor in his own small law firm, as an academic lawyer at the University of New South Wales, and as a corporate tax lawyer, having retired from PwC. He continues to write as a literary reviewer for The Australian newspaper.

On the occasion of the 150th anniversary of Rainer Maria Rilke's birth in 2025, Lehmann published translations of fifty poems from Rilke's 1907 collection New Poems, adding Rilke's untitled last poem, written on his deathbed in 1926, Komm du, du letzter, den ich anerkenne (Come my last visitor. I know your name).

Journalist Claire Lehmann is his daughter-in-law.

== Awards ==
- Grace Leven Prize for Poetry, winner 1965 for The Ilex Tree with Les Murray
- Grace Leven Prize for Poetry, winner 1981 for Nero's Poems
- Grace Leven Prize for Poetry, winner 1997 for Collected Poems
- Prime Minister's Literary Awards – Poetry, winner 2015 for Poems 1957–2013

== Bibliography ==
=== Poetry ===
- The Ilex Tree with Les Murray (1965)
- Lehmann, Geoffrey (1968). A Voyage of Lions and Other Poems. Sydney: Angus and Robertson.
- Comic Australian Verse (1972) Editor
- Conversation with a Rider (1972)
- Selected Poems (1976)
- Ross' Poems (1978)
- Nero's Poems: Translations of the public and private poems of the Emperor Nero (1981)
- Children's Games (1990)
- Spring Forest (1992)
- Collected Poems (1997)
- Baking at Night and Other Poems (2003)
- Poems 1957–2013 (2014)
- Fifty Poems (2025), translation of poems from Rainer Maria Rilke's collection New Poems

=== Novels ===
- A Spring Day in Autumn (1974)

=== Children's fiction ===
- The Balloon Farmer (1994) with Betty Greenhatch
- Sky Boy (2001) with Caroline Magerl

=== Non-fiction ===
- Australian Primitive Painters (1974) editor, art
- Lehmann, Geoffrey (January–February 2016). "Music and language, cultural identity and fame". Quadrant. 60 (1–2): 92–98.
- Lehmann, Geoffrey (2018). Leeward: A Memoir. NewSouth Books. ISBN 978-1-74223-613-1.

=== Edited ===
- Hermes (1962)
- Comic Australian Verse (1972)
- The Younger Australian Poets (1983) editor with Robert Gray
- The Flight of the Emu (1990)
- Australian Poetry in the Twentieth Century edited with Robert Gray, Heinemann, 1991
- Australian Poetry Since 1788 (2011) editor with Robert Gray

=== Book reviews ===
Date	Review article	Work(s) reviewed
2013	Lehmann, Geoffrey (April 2013). "Giving it a go : brilliantly observed and precise poems". Australian Book Review. 350: 24–25.	Wallace-Crabbe, Chris (2013). New and Selected Poems. Manchester: Carcanet.
